= List of Port Adelaide Football Club honours =

Annual awards by Australian rules football club

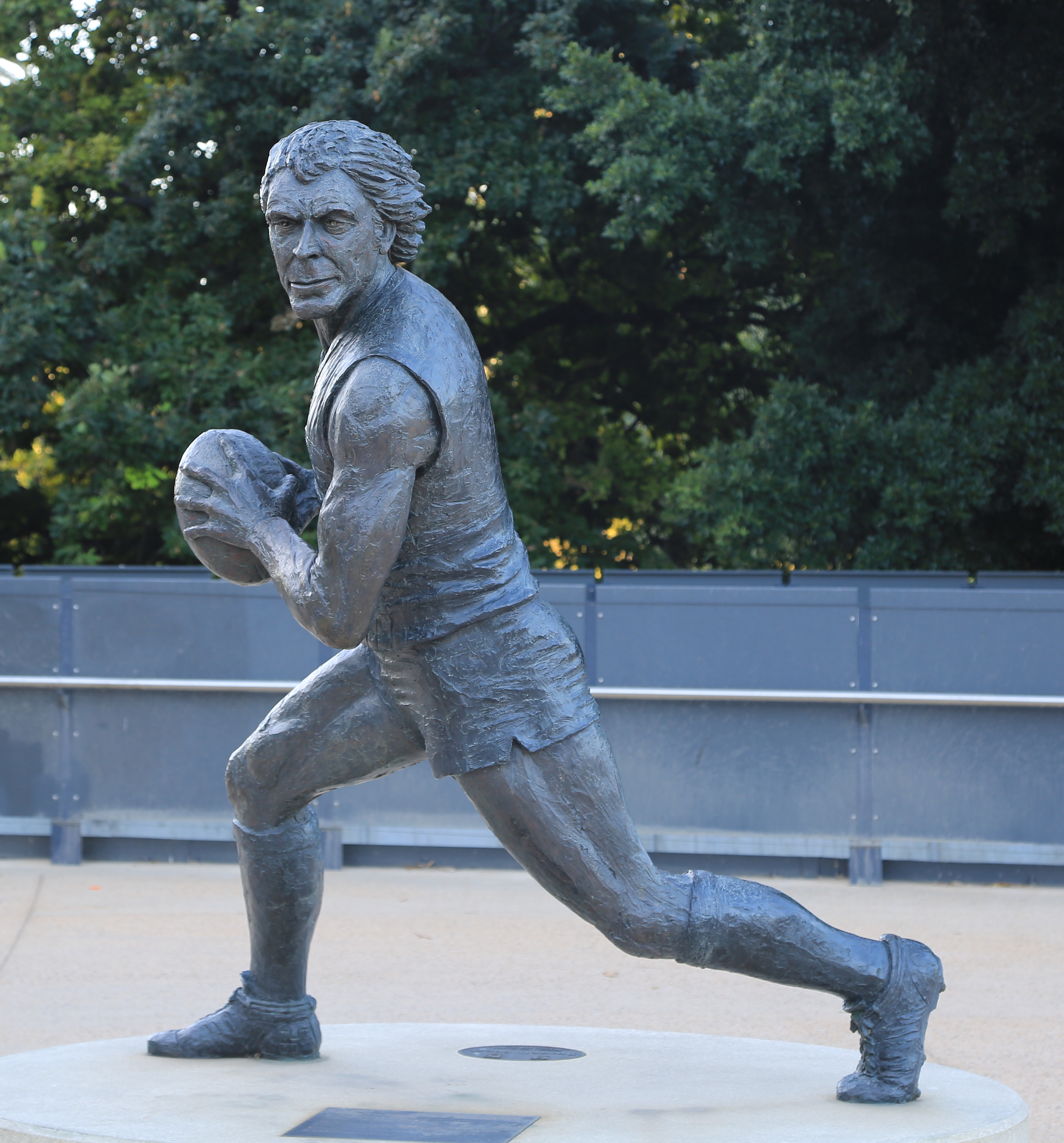
A statue of Russell Ebert located outside of Adelaide Oval. Ebert holds the club record for most best and fairest awards won, with six.

Port Adelaide Football Club is a professional Australian rules football club based in Alberton, South Australia. The club fields teams in three competitions; a senior men's team in the Australian Football League (AFL), a senior women's team in the AFL Women's (AFLW) and a reserves men's team in the South Australian National Football League (SANFL). The club was a founding member of the South Australian Football Association (SAFA) in 1877, joined the AFL in 1997, and joined the AFLW in 2022.

This list encompasses the club awards that have been created by the club to recognise outstanding performance, attitude, and contribution made by players and those associated with the club across all competitions. The club's record holder for Best and Fairest awards is Russell Ebert, who won six across his career.

All award records are correct as of 2 September 2026.

== Best and Fairest ==
Section Legend
^	Denotes current player
+	Player won Magarey Medal in same season
#	Player won Brownlow Medal in same season
✪	Player won Ken Farmer Medal in same season
(2)	Repeat winner of award

=== Pre-AFL ===
Since the club's formation in 1870, the club has awarded an annual best and fairest award to the best performing player for a given year. The recipients of these awards have been recorded on the club's honour roll.

John Cahill Medal - Pre-AFL
Season	Best and fairest
1870	John Wald
1871	Fred Stone
1872	—N/a
1873	Samuel Tyzack
1874	—N/a
1875	Henry Ford
1876	Ernest LeMessurier
1877	Thomas Smith
1878	Thomas Smith (2)
1879	Thomas Smith (3)
1880	John Sidoli
1881	John Sidoli (2)
1882	James Munro
1883	Robert Kirkpatrick
1884	George Cairns
1884	Charles Kellett
1885	Michael Coffee
1886	Charlie Fry
1887	William Bushby
1887	Richard Walsh
1888	Harry Phillips
1889	Goody Hamilton
1890	Charlie Fry (2)
1891	Harry Phillips (2)
1892	Harry Phillips (3)
1893	Walter Murray
1893	Harry Phillips (4)
1894	Alf Miers
1895	Otway L'Estage
1896	George Linklater
1897	Ken McKenzie
1898	Archibald Hosie
1899	Stan Malin +
1900	John Quinn Sr.
1901	Ted Strawns
1902	Lewis Corston
1903	James Tompkins
1904	Lewis Corston (2)
1905	John Quinn Sr. (2)
1906	Ted Strawns (2)
1907	Jack Mack +
1908	Sinclair Dickson
1909	Sinclair Dickson (2)
1910	Sampson Hosking +
1911	Harold Oliver
1912	Harold Oliver (2)
1913	Harry Eaton
1914	Jack Ashley +
1915	Harry Eaton (2)
1916 (Note: The South Australian Football League was in recess from 1916 to 1918 due to World War I.)	—N/a
1917	—N/a
1918	—N/a
1919	Jack Ashley (2)
1920	Charlie Adams
1921	Charlie Adams + (2)
1922	Clem Dayman
1923	Les Dayman
1924	Les Dayman (2)
1925	Peter Bampton +
1926	Lawrence Hodge
1927	Clifford Keal
1928	Les Dayman (3)
1929	Ernest Mucklow
1930	Victor Johnson
1931	Maurice Allingham
1932	Ernest Mucklow (2)
1933	Jack Dermody
1934	Albert Hollingworth
1935	Jack Dermody (2)
1936	Albert Hollingworth (2)
1937	Bob Quinn
1938	Bob Quinn + (2)
1939	Allan Reval
1940	Reginald Schumann
1941	John Skelley
1942 (Note: The Port Adelaide Football Club was temporarily merged with West Torrens during the 1942, 1943 and 1944 SANFL seasons because of World War II.)	—N/a
1943	—N/a
1944	—N/a
1945	Bob Quinn + (3)
1946	Lew Roberts
1947	Bob Quinn (4)
1948	Dick Russell
1949	Dick Russell (2)
1950	Fos Williams
1951	Dick Russell (3)
1952	Ray Whitaker
1953	Harold McDonald
1954	Roger Clift
1955	Fos Williams (2)
1956	Edward Whelan
1957	Neville Hayes
1958	Geof Motley
1959	Geof Motley (2)
1960	Neville Hayes (2)
1961	Jeff Potter
1962	Peter Obst
1963	Geof Motley (3)
1964	Jeff Potter (2)
1965	Geof Motley (4)
1966	John Cahill
1967	Jeff Potter (3)
1968	John Cahill (2)
1969	Jeff Potter (4)
1970	John Cahill (3)
1971	Russell Ebert +
1972	Russell Ebert (2)
1973	John Cahill (4)
1974	Russell Ebert + (3)
1975	Peter Woite +
1976	Russell Ebert + (4)
1977	Russell Ebert (5)
1978	Stephen Clifford
1979	Milan Faletic
1980	Stephen Clifford (2)
1981	Russell Ebert (6)
1982	Craig Bradley
1983	Stephen Clifford (3)
1984	Craig Bradley (2)
1985	Craig Bradley (3)
1986	Martin Leslie
1987	Bruce Abernethy
1988	Greg Phillips
1989	Russell Johnston
1990	Scott Hodges + ✪
1991	Paul Northeast
1992	Nathan Buckley +
1993	Troy Bond
1994	Tim Ginever
1995	Robbie West
1996	Scott Hodges ✪ (2)

=== John Cahill Medal ===
The John Cahill Medal is a medal that has been awarded to the club's best performing AFL player each year since the club's entry to the AFL in 1997. The medal is named after John Cahill, who coached the club to a league-record 10 SANFL premierships, and was the club's first AFL coach. As of 2025, the voting system for the medal is handled by a panel of three coaching staff members. For each match, the senior coach, club's general manager, and respective line coach each award players between 0 and 5 votes based on their performances, with a maximum of 15 votes attainable.

The award is recognised by the club as a successor to the Best and Fairest award handed out between 1870 and 1996, with winners of the medal appearing on the club's honour board.

John Cahill Medal - AFL Era
Season	Best and fairest	Ref.
1997	Darren Mead	
1998	Adam Kingsley	
1999	Stephen Paxman	
2000	Brett Montgomery	
2001	Warren Tredrea	
2002	Matthew Primus	
2003	Gavin Wanganeen	
2004	Warren Tredrea (2)	
2005	Warren Tredrea (3)	
2006	Brendon Lade	
2007	Kane Cornes	
2008	Kane Cornes (2)	
2009	Warren Tredrea (4)	
2010	Kane Cornes (3)	
2011	Travis Boak	
2011	Jackson Trengove	
2012	Kane Cornes (4)	
2013	Chad Wingard	
2014	Robbie Gray	
2015	Robbie Gray (2)	
2016	Robbie Gray (3)	
2017	Paddy Ryder	
2018	Justin Westhoff	
2019	Travis Boak (2)	
2020	Darcy Byrne-Jones ^	
2021	Ollie Wines ^ #	
2022	Connor Rozee ^	
2023	Zak Butters ^	
2024	Zak Butters ^ (2)	
2025	Zak Butters ^ (3)	
2026	Jason Horne-Francis ^	

== AFL ==
Section Legend
^	Denotes current player
★	Player won AFL Rising Star in same season
(2)	Repeat winner of award

=== Gavin Wanganeen Medal ===
The Gavin Wanganeen Medal is a medal awarded to the club's best performing AFL player under the age of 21 each year. The medal was first introduced in 2006 and is named after former club captain Gavin Wanganeen, who was one of the club's youngest ever debutants and premiership players.

Gavin Wanganeen Medal
Season	Winner	Ref.
2006	Danyle Pearce ★	
2007	Justin Westhoff	
2008	Alipate Carlile	
2009	Travis Boak	
2010	Jackson Trengove	
2011	Hamish Hartlett	
2012	Chad Wingard	
2013	Ollie Wines ^	
2014	Ollie Wines ^ (2)	
2015	Ollie Wines ^ (3)	
2016	Jarman Impey	
2017	Sam Powell-Pepper ^	
2018	Dan Houston	
2019	Connor Rozee ^	
2020	Zak Butters ^	
2021	Mitch Georgiades ^	
2022	Lachie Jones ^	
2023	Jason Horne-Francis ^	
2024	Jason Horne-Francis ^ (2)	
2025	Christian Moraes ^	
2026	Jack Whitlock ^	

=== Fos Williams Medal ===
The Fos Williams Medal is a medal awarded to the AFL player who best embodies the team's values both on and off field, as voted by the players. The award is named after Foster Williams, who coached the club to nine premierships. As of 2025, the voting system for the award sees players vote for three of their teammates in a 3-2-1 manner, based on who they believe best embodies the team's values.

Fos Williams Medal
Season	Winner	Ref.
1997	Brayden Lyle	
1998	Brayden Lyle (2)	
1999	Josh Francou	
2000	Matthew Primus	
2001	Matthew Primus (2)	
2002	Josh Carr	
2003	Josh Carr (2)	
2004	Michael Wilson	
2005	Darryl Wakelin	
2006	Brendon Lade	
2007	Troy Chaplin	
2008	Domenic Cassisi	
2009	Domenic Cassisi (2)	
2010	Domenic Cassisi (3)	
2011	Domenic Cassisi (4)	
2012	Brad Ebert	
2013	Travis Boak	
2014	Travis Boak (2)	
2015	Travis Boak (3)	
2016	Jasper Pittard	
2017	Tom Jonas	
2018	Tom Jonas (2)	
2019	Travis Boak (4)	
2020	Travis Boak (5)	
2021	Travis Boak (6)	
2022	Travis Boak (7)	
2023	Willem Drew ^	
2024	Willem Drew ^ (2)	
2025	Willem Drew ^ (3)	
2026	Willem Drew ^ (4)	

=== Coaches' Award ===
The Coaches' Award is an award given to the club's most improved player in the AFL, as voted by the coaches.

Coaches' Award
Season	Winner	Ref.
1998	Warren Tredrea	
1999	Warren Tredrea (2)	
2000	Roger James	
2001	Josh Carr	
2002	Chad Cornes	
2003	Dean Brogan	
2004	Kane Cornes	
2005	Domenic Cassisi	
2006	Shaun Burgoyne	
2007	David Rodan	
2008	Travis Boak	
2009	Robbie Gray	
2010	Paul Stewart	
2011	Tom Logan	
2012	Tom Jonas	
2013	Justin Westhoff	
2014	Matthew Lobbe	
2015	Brendon Ah Chee	
2016	Jasper Pittard	
2017	Sam Gray	
2018	Dan Houston	
2019	Darcy Byrne-Jones ^	
2020	Trent McKenzie	
2021	Karl Amon	
2022	Connor Rozee ^	
2023	Miles Bergman ^	
2024	Jase Burgoyne ^	
2025	Esava Ratugolea ^	
2026	Josh Lai ^	

=== John McCarthy Medal ===
The John McCarthy Medal is a medal awarded to an AFL player who makes an outstanding contribution to the community when representing the club, external from existing club programs. The award was first introduced in 2013 in commemoration of John McCarthy, a Port Adelaide player who passed away following an accident during an end-of-season trip in 2012.

John McCarthy Medal
Season	Winner	Ref.
2013	Jack Hombsch	
2014	Brad Ebert	
2015	Nathan Krakouer	
2016	Jack Hombsch (2)	
2017	Jack Hombsch (3)	
2018	Justin Westhoff	
2019	Travis Boak	
2020	Justin Westhoff (2)	
2021	Travis Boak (2)	
2022	Sam Mayes	
2023	Trent Dumont	
2024	Dante Visentini ^	
2025	Willie Rioli	
2026	Benny Barrett	

=== Bruce Weber Memorial Trophy ===
The Bruce Weber Memorial Trophy is awarded annually to the player who finishes third in the John Cahill Medal voting. The award was renamed in 2006 after Bruce Weber, a former club president and a leading contributor to the club's bid for AFL entry. Prior to 2021, the trophy was awarded to the best team player in the SANFL, as voted by the players.

Bruce Weber Memorial Trophy
Season	Winner	Ref.
1986	Martin Leslie	
1987	Stephen Curtis	
1988	Russell Johnston	
1989	Greg Phillips	
1990	Greg Phillips (2)	
1991	Paul Northeast	
1992	Tim Ginever	
1993	Tim Ginever (2)	
1994	Stephen Williams	
1995	Darren Smith	
1996	Darryl Poole	
1997	Darryl Borlase	
1998	Danny Morgan	
1999	Brian Leys	
2000	Ricky O'Loughlin	
2001	Corey Ah Chee	
2002	Brayden Lyle	
2003	Paul Evans	
2004	Anthony Brown	
2005	Anthony Brown (2)	
2006	Matthew Lokan	
2007	Tom Carr	
2008	Daniel Lees	
2009	Corey Ah Chee (2)	
2010	James Meiklejohn	
2011	Daniel Kulikowski	
2012	Jarrod Young	
2013	Sam Gray	
2014	Anthony Biemans	
2015	Louis Sharrad	
2016	Paul Stewart	
2017	Matthew Lobbe	
2018	Jack Strange	
2019	Jack Strange (2)	
2020 (Note: Not awarded due to the club not participating in SANFL.)	—N/a	
2021	Aliir Aliir ^	
2022	Dan Houston	
2023	Dan Houston (2)	
2024	Aliir Aliir ^ (2)	
2025	Connor Rozee ^	
2026	Mitch Georgiades ^	

== AFLW ==
Section Legend
^	Denotes current player
#	Player won AFL Women's best and fairest in same season
✪	Player won AFL Women's leading goalkicker award in same season
★	Player won AFL Women's Rising Star in same season
(2)	Repeat winner of award

=== AFLW Best and Fairest Medal ===
The AFLW Best and Fairest award is given to the best performing AFLW player across a given year. As of 2024, the voting system for the medal is handled by a panel of three coaching staff members. For each match, the senior coach, head of AFLW, and respective line coach each award players between 0 and 5 votes based on their performances, with a maximum of 15 votes attainable.

AFLW Best and Fairest Medal
Season	Winner	Ref
2022 (S7)	Hannah Ewings ★	
2023	Abbey Dowrick ^	
2024	Matilda Scholz ^ ★	
2025	Matilda Scholz ^ (2)	

=== AFLW Best First Year Player ===
The AFLW Best First Year Player award is given to the best performing player on the list who is playing their first year in the AFLW competition.

AFLW Best First Year Player
Season	Winner	Ref
2022 (S7)	Hannah Ewings ★	
2023	Matilda Scholz ^	
2024	Shineah Goody ^	
2025	Jasmine Sowden ^	

=== AFLW Coaches' Award ===
The AFLW Coaches' Award is given to the player deemed to be most improved for a given season as determined by the coaches.

AFLW Coaches' Award
Season	Winner	Ref
2022 (S7)	Ella Boag ^	
2023	Julia Teakle ^	
2024	Amelie Borg ^	
2025	Sachi Syme ^	

=== AFLW Player's Player ===
The AFLW Player's Player award is given to the player who best represent team values, as voted by the playing group.

AFLW Player's Player
Season	Winner	Ref
2022 (S7)	Ebony O'Dea ^	
2023	Maria Moloney ^	
2024	Amelie Borg ^	
2025	Ella Boag ^	

=== AFLW Leading Goalkicker ===
The AFLW Leading Goalkicker award is given to the player who kicks the most goals for the club across a given season. The award was first awarded in 2024.

AFLW Leading Goalkicker
Season	Best and fairest	Ref
2024	Gemma Houghton ^	
2025	Indy Tahau ^ ✪	

== SANFL ==
Section Legend
^	Denotes current player
˅	Denotes current player (AFL)
+	Player won Magarey Medal in same season
✪	Player won Ken Farmer Medal in same season
(2)	Repeat winner of award

=== Allan Robert McLean Medal ===
The Allan Robert McLean Medal (A.R McLean Medal) is a medal awarded to the club's best performing SANFL player each year. The award is named after Bob McLean, a former player who served as the club's secretary and general manager for over 30 years following his retirement from football. As of 2025, the voting system for the award consists of each member of the coaching panel awarding between 0 and 5 votes to players based on their performances, with a maximum of 20 votes attainable per match.

A.R. McLean Medal
Season	Winner	Ref
1986	Martin Leslie	
1987	Bruce Abernethy	
1988	Greg Phillips	
1989	Russell Johnston	
1990	Scott Hodges + ✪	
1991	Paul Northeast	
1992	Nathan Buckley +	
1993	Troy Bond	
1994	Tim Ginever	
1995	Robbie West	
1996	Scott Hodges ✪ (2)	
1997	Tim Ginever (2)	
1998	Bryan Beinke	
1999	Darryl Poole	
2000	Phil McGuinness	
2001	Ryan O'Connor +	
2002	Corey Ah Chee	
2003	Brett Ebert +	
2004	Kristian DePasquale	
2005	Jeremy Clayton +	
2006	Jeremy Clayton (2)	
2007	Jeremy Clayton (3)	
2008	Jeremy Clayton (4)	
2009	Brad Murray	
2010	Steven Summerton	
2011	Mark Dolling	
2012	Jeremy Clayton (5)	
2013	Sam Gray	
2014	Steven Summerton (2)	
2015	Steven Summerton (3)	
2016	Kane Mitchell	
2017	Brendon Ah Chee	
2018	Will Snelling	
2019	Jack Trengove	
2020	—N/a	
2021	Sam Hayes	
2022	Cam Sutcliffe	
2023	Nick Moore ^	
2024	Tom Clurey	
2025	Jack Watkins ˅	
2026	Will Lorenz	

=== Max Porter Memorial Trophy ===
The Max Porter Memorial Trophy is an awarded given to the player who finishes second in the voting for the A.R McLean medal. The trophy was first handed out in 1987, and is named after former club servant Max Porter. Prior to 2021, the award was given to the SANFL player deemed most consistent for the year.

Max Porter Memorial Trophy
Season	Winner	Ref
1987	Phil Harrison	
1988	Darren Smith	
1989	Simon Tregenza	
1990	Simon Tregenza (2)	
1991	George Fiacchi	
1992	Roger Delaney	
1993	Roger Delaney (2)	
1994	Scott Spalding	
1995	Rohan Smith	
1996	Darryl Borlase	
1997	Darren Smith (2)	
1998	Richard Ambrose	
1999	Phil McGuinness	
2000	Phil McGuinness (2)	
2001	Ryan O'Connor +	
2002	—N/a	
2003	Craig Parry	
2004	Corey Ah Chee	
2005	Daniel Elstone	
2006	Corey Ah Chee (2)	
2007	Joel Perry	
2008	Joel Perry (2)	
2009	Brad Murray	
2010	Steven Summerton	
2011	Mark Dolling	
2012	Luke Slattery	
2013	Kory Beard	
2014	Steven Summerton (2)	
2015	Steven Summerton (3)	
2016	Kane Mitchell	
2017	Jarrod Lienert	
2018	Jimmy Toumpas	
2019	Trent McKenzie	
2020	—N/a	
2021	Joel Garner	
2022	Sam Mayes	
2023	Trent Dumont	
2024	Will Lorenz	
2025	Jez McLennan ^	
2026	Will Brodie ˅	

=== Anthony Williams Memorial Trophy ===
The Anthony Williams Memorial Trophy is a trophy awarded to the most improved player in the SANFL, as voted by the coaches. The trophy created in 1988 in commemoration of Anthony Williams, a Port Adelaide player who passed away during the 1988 SANFL season in a building accident. Prior to 2021, the trophy was awarded to the SANFL player deemed most courageous, and between 2021 and 2024 it was awarded to the best SANFL-contracted player.

Anthony Williams Memorial Trophy
Season	Winner	Ref
1988	Tim Ginever	
1989	Stephen Williams	
1990	Tim Ginever (2)	
1991	Mark Williams	
1992	Darren Smith	
1993	Darryl Borlase	
1994	Stephen Carter	
1995	Tim Ginever (3)	
1996	Darryl Poole	
1997	Mark Clayton	
1998	Alf Steed	
1999	Mark Clayton (2)	
2000	Alf Steed (2)	
2001	Alf Steed (3)	
2002	Mark Clayton (3)	
2003	Corey Ah Chee	
2004	Nigel Fiegart	
2005	Mark Clayton (4)	
2006	Kristian DePasquale	
2007	Levi Greenwood	
2008	Daniel Elstone	
2009	Daniel Elstone (2)	
2010	Kory Beard	
2011	Luke Harder	
2012	Daniel Kulikowski	
2013	Daniel Kulikowski (2)	
2014	Tom Logan	
2015	Tom Logan (2)	
2016	Anthony Biemans	
2017	Joe Atley	
2018	Jack Trengove	
2019	Joel Garner	
2020	—N/a	
2021	Campbell Wildman	
2022	Nick Moore ^	
2023	Nick Moore ^ (2)	
2024	Jake Weidemann	
2025	Jake Weidemann(2)	
2026	Jez McLennan ^	

=== SANFL Best First Year Player ===
The Best First Year Player award was an awarded given to the player regarded by club staff to have performed the best during their first season with the club. The award was handed out annually between 1986 and 2016, and was last awarded in 2018. During the mid-2000s, the award was briefly named after John Warren, a life member with the club.

SANFL Best First Year Player
Season	Winner	Ref
1986	Geoff Phelps	
1987	Andrew Obst	
1988	David Brown	
1989	Adrian Settre	
1990	Gavin Wanganeen	
1991	Nathan Buckley	
1992	Julian Burton	
1993	Che Cockatoo-Collins	
1994	Darryl Wakelin	
1995	Clive Waterhouse	
1996	Nigel Fiegert	
1997	Brett Higgins	
1998	Paul Vines	
1999	Ricky O'Loughlin	
2000	Corey Ah Chee	
2001	James Wilson	
2002	Brett Ebert	
2003	Harry Miller	
2004	Shayne Biasci	
2005	Ivan Maric	
2006	Mark Dolling	
2007	Levi Greenwood	
2008	Kerren Hall	
2009	Daniel Stanley	
2010	Luke Carey	
2011	Justin Hoskin	
2012	Aseri Raikiwasa	
2013	Jake Johansen	
2014	Karl Amon	
2015	Sidney Masters	
2016	Nathan Rudloff	
2017	—N/a	
2018	Jack Kluske	

=== Fos Williams Memorial Trophy ===
The Fos Williams Memorial trophy was awarded annually to the club's most dedicated player in the SANFL competition. Starting in 2002, the award was named after former coach Foster Williams, who coached the club to nine premierships. The trophy was awarded between 1986 and 2019.

Fos Williams Memorial Trophy
Season	Winner	Ref
1986	Craig Lum	
1987	Martin Leslie	
1988	Tim Ginever	
1989	Darren Smith	
1990	Mark Williams	
1991	Gary Smallridge	
1992	Darryl Borlase	
1993	Tim Ginever (2)	
1994	Stephen Williams	
1995	Roger Delaney	
1996	Michael Wilson	
1997	Phil McGuinness	
1998	Brian Leys	
1999	Damien Brown	
2000	Mark Clayton	
2001	Shane Holmes	
2002	Jared Ilett	
2003	Mark Clayton (2)	
2004	Kristian DePasquale	
2005	Kristian DePasquale (2)	
2006	Mark Clayton (3)	
2007	Justin Perkins	
2008	Kristian DePasquale (3)	
2009	Justin Perkins (2)	
2010	Jarrod Young	
2011	Daniel Kulikowski	
2012	Jarrod Young (2)	
2013	Steven Summerton	
2014	Ben Newton	
2015	Anthony Biemans	
2016	Luke Reynolds	
2017	Jimmy Toumpas	
2018	Will Snelling	
2019	Sam Mayes	

== Other ==
Section Legend
(2)	Repeat winner of award

=== Bob Clayton Memorial Award ===
The Bob Clayton Memorial Award was created to recognise individuals who have performed outstanding work within Port Adelaide's SANFL division whilst demonstrating the qualities of positivity, honesty, loyalty, trustworthiness and commitment. The award was created in 2011 in commemoration of Bob Clayton, a former player and key administrator for the club during their entry to the AFL.

Bob Clayton Memorial Award
Year	Winner	Ref
2011	Daniel Lees	
2012	Adrian Settre	
2013	John Settre	
2014	Linda Crabb	
2015	Garry Hocking	
2016	Anthony Biemans	
2017	Mark Clayton	
2018	Steven Summerton	
2019	John Settre (2)	
2020	—N/a	
2021	Bob O'Malley	
2022	Alf Trebilcock	
2023	Paul Rizonico	
2024	Chris Glacken	
2025	Dianne O'Malley	
2026	John Settre (3)	

|}
