= Tate Kaesler =

Australian rules footballer (born 1979)

- Kaesler with Gold Coast in 2026

Personal information
- Full name: Tate Scott Kaesler
- Nickname: Piglet
- Born: 11 November 1979 (age 46)

Playing career
Years	Club	Games (Goals)
2001–2002	Sturt	
2003–2007	North Adelaide	31 (25)

Coaching career
Years	Club	Games (W–L–D)
2021; 2024–26	Gold Coast (VFL)	65 (24–38–3) (Note: This does not include the match between Gold Coast and Southport in round 16 of the 2021 VFL season, which was abandoned for no result after ten minutes of play because of the announcement of a snap COVID-19 lockdown.)

Career highlights
- 3x SANFL reserves premiership player: 1999, 2005, 2006; 2x Sturt reserves best-and-fairest: 2001, 2002

Tate Scott Kaesler (born 11 November 1979) is an Australian rules football coach and former player who currently serves as a development coach at the Hawthorn Football Club in the Australian Football League (AFL). He previously worked at the Gold Coast Suns as an assistant coach for eight years and served as the club's reserves coach in the Victorian Football League (VFL) for four non-consecutive seasons.

Kaesler played for Sturt and North Adelaide during a seven-year career in the South Australian National Football League (SANFL), which included playing in three reserves premierships.

== Career ==
=== Playing career ===
Kaesler captained the Sturt Football Club's under-19s team in the South Australian National Football League (SANFL) for the 1998 season, finishing second in the team's best-and-fairest count. In 1999, he played for Sturt in the club's reserves premiership victory. Kaesler made his senior SANFL debut in round 19 of the 2001 season against Glenelg at Unley Oval. He won Sturt's reserves best-and-fairest award in 2001 and 2002 SANFL season.

In 2003, Kaesler moved to the North Adelaide Football Club, making his senior debut for the club in round 1 against Central District at Prospect Oval; he played seven senior matches and six reserves matches for the season. After not playing any senior matches in 2004, Kaesler played the majority of the 2005 season in the reserves. In the absence of appointed captain Ben Walton, he captained North Adelaide's reserves team in the 2005 grand final, which the club won by one point over Glenelg. Kaesler also served as vice-captain in the 2006 reserves grand final, which saw North Adealide defeat Norwood by 97 points. He retired as a player at the end of the 2007 season, finishing his career with a total of 180 senior and reserves matches, including 31 senior matches at North Adelaide.

=== Coaching career ===
After retiring as a player, Kaesler moved into a coaching career. He was an assistant coach for the SANFL under-20s representative team in a match against the SANFL under-18s, which the SANFL under-20s won by 79 points at Adelaide Oval. In 2009, he joined the Adelaide Football Club as a development coach. During his ten seasons at the club, his roles included developing the forward line and later focusing on team defence.

On 29 August 2018, the Gold Coast Suns announced Kaesler had joined the club as a development coach in a role assisting the midfield coaching group. He worked with Gold Coast's reserves team in the North East Australian Football League (NEAFL) under head coach Nick Malceski during the 2019 season. Following the disbandment of the NEAFL, Kaesler was appointed as Gold Coast's reserves coach in the Victorian Football League (VFL) in 2021, coaching the Suns to four wins in ten matches before the season was curtailed due to the impact of the COVID-19 pandemic. Kaesler was succeeded as VFL head coach by Jackson Kornberg at the end of the year and moved into a new role as Gold Coast's team defence and strategy coach.

In 2024, Kaesler returned to the role of Gold Coast's VFL head coach to take over from Josh Drummond, who had led the team to a premiership victory in the previous season. The Suns finished seventh on the ladder with ten wins and two draws, but were eliminated from the finals series after a three-point loss to Frankston in the wildcard final at People First Stadium. Under Kaesler as head coach, Gold Coast missed the VFL finals in 2025 and 2026. On 6 November 2026, the Hawthorn Football Club announced it had appointed Kaesler as a development coach for the 2027 season.

== Statistics ==
=== Coaching statistics ===
Legend
W	Wins	L	Losses	D	Draws	W%	Winning percentage	LP	Ladder position	LT	League teams

Season	Team	League	Games	W	L	D	W %	Ladder
2021	Gold Coast	VFL	10	4	6	0	40.0%	14 / 22
2024	Gold Coast	VFL	19	10	7	2	52.6%	7 / 21
2025	Gold Coast	VFL	18	7	10	1	38.9%	14 / 21
2026	Gold Coast	VFL	18	3	15	0	16.7%	22 / 22
