= Martin Leslie =

Martin Leslie may refer to:

- Martin Leslie (Australian footballer) (born 1962), former Australian rules footballer
- Martin Leslie (rugby union) (born 1971), New Zealand born former professional rugby union player who played international rugby for Scotland
