= List of Gold Coast Suns coaches =

The following is a list of the Gold Coast Suns senior coaches in each of their seasons in the Australian Football League.

== AFL ==
Statistics correct to the end of round 2, 2026.

#	Coach	Seasons	G	W	L	D	Win%	FG	FW	FL	FD	F Win%	GF	P	Ref
1	Guy McKenna	2011–2014	88	24	64	0	27.27	—	—	—	—	—	—	—	
2	Rodney Eade	2015–2017	63	16	46	1	26.19	—	—	—	—	—	—	—	
	Dean Solomon†	2017	3	0	3	0	0.00	—	—	—	—	—	—	—	
3	Stuart Dew	2018–2023	121	36	84	1	29.75	—	—	—	—	—	—	—	
	Steven King†	2023	7	2	5	0	28.57	—	—	—	—	—	—	—	
4	Damien Hardwick	2024–	51	30	21	0	58.82	2	1	1	—	50.00	—	—	

== AFL Women's ==
Statistics correct to the end of the 2024 AFL Women's season.

#	Coach	Seasons	G	W	L	D	Win%	FG	FW	FL	FD	F Win%	GF	P	Ref
1	David Lake	2020–2021	15	2	12	1	16.67	1	0	1	0	0.00	—	—	
2	Cameron Joyce	2022–2024	41	15	23	3	36.59	1	0	1	0	0.00	—	—	
3	Rhyce Shaw	2025–	12	2	10	—	16.67	—	—	—	—	—	—	—	

== NEAFL/VFL ==
Statistics correct to the end of the 2025 VFL season.

#	Coach	Seasons	G	W	L	D	Win%	FG	FW	FL	FD	F Win%	GF	P	Ref
1	Shaun Hart	2011–2013	53	30	23	0	56.60	3	0	3	0	0.00	—	—	
2	Josh Fraser	2014–2015	36	8	28	0	22.22	—	—	—	—	—	—	—	
3	Steve Daniel	2016–2017	36	18	18	0	50.00	3	1	2	0	33.33	—	—	
4	Nick Malceski	2018–2020	36	15	21	0	41.67	—	—	—	—	—	—	—	
5, 8	Tate Kaesler	2021, 2024–	37	17	17	3	50.0	1	0	1	0	0.00	—	—	
6	Jackson Kornberg	2022	18	12	6	0	66.67	3	2	1	0	66.67	—	—	
7	Josh Drummond	2023	18	16	2	0	88.89	3	3	0	0	100.00	1	1	

== Notes ==
=== Key ===
#	Number of coaches		
G	Total games coached	FG	Finals games coached
W	Total wins	FW	Finals wins
L	Total losses	FL	Finals losses
D	Total draws	FD	Finals draws
Win%	Overall winning percentage	F Win%	Finals winning percentage
GF	Grand Final appearances: number of Grand Final appearances achieved by the coach		
P	Premierships: number of premierships achieved by the coach		
†	Caretaker coach		
