= 1997 SANFL season =

- Teams: 9
- Premiers: Norwood; 27th premiership
- Minor premiers: Norwood; 16th minor premiership
- Magarey Medallist: Brodie Atkinson; Sturt (23 votes); Andrew Jarman; Norwood (23 votes)
- Ken Farmer Medallist: Jim West; Norwood (73 Goals)
- Matches played: 96
- Highest: 44,161 (Grand Final, Norwood vs. Port Adelaide)

The 1997 South Australian National Football League season was the 118th season of the top-level Australian rules football competition in South Australia.

== Ladder ==
1997 SANFL Ladder
Pos	Team	Pld	W	L	D	PF	PA	PP	Pts
1	Norwood (P)	20	17	3	0	2110	1145	64.82	34
2	Port Adelaide	20	12	7	1	1667	1544	51.92	25
3	Central District	20	12	8	0	1957	1507	56.50	24
4	Sturt	20	11	7	2	1605	1563	50.66	24
5	North Adelaide	20	11	8	1	1718	1547	52.62	23
6	West Adelaide	20	8	11	1	1533	1640	48.31	17
7	Woodville-West Torrens	20	6	14	0	1491	1810	45.17	12
8	Glenelg	20	5	14	1	1391	2112	39.71	11
9	South Adelaide	20	4	14	2	1348	1952	40.85	10

Rules for classification: 1) points; 2) percentage; 3) number of points for.
(P) Premiers

== Grand final ==
1997 SANFL Grand Final
Sunday, 5 October (2:10 pm)	Norwood	def.	Port Adelaide	Football Park (crowd: 44,161)
3.4 (22); 6.5 (41); 13.8 (86); 19.12 (126)	Q1; Q2; Q3; Final	1.2 (8); 3.3 (21); 4.7 (31); 7.11 (53)
