= Paul Northeast =

Australian rules footballer

Personal information
- Position: Defender

Playing career
Years	Club	Games (Goals)
1987–2000	Port Adelaide (SANFL)	235 (11)

Representative team honours
Years	Team	Games (Goals)
- South Australia

Career highlights
- 8x Port Adelaide premiership player (1989-1990, 1992, 1994-1996, 1998-1999); Port Adelaide best and fairest (1991); Inducted into Port Adelaide Football Club Hall of Fame 2018

Paul Northeast is a former Australian rules footballer for the Port Adelaide Football Club in the South Australian National Football League (SANFL). He won eight premierships during his career and won the clubs best and fairest in 1991.
