= Andrew Jarman =

Australian rules footballer (born 1966)

Personal information
- Full name: Andrew Newton Jarman
- Born: 14 January 1966 (age 60); Adelaide, South Australia
- Original team: Gaza U16 (SAAFL)
- Draft: No. 15, 1987 national draft
- Height: 177 cm (5 ft 10 in)
- Weight: 91 kg (14 st 5 lb)

Playing career^{1}
Years	Club	Games (Goals)
1983–1989	North Adelaide	141 (86) (Note: These tallies refer to premiership matches (home-and-away and finals matches) only.)
1990, 1994, 1996–1997	Norwood	49 (33)
1991–1996	Adelaide	110 (92)
Total		300 (211)

Representative team honours
Years	Team	Games (Goals)
1986–1995	South Australia	15 (6)

Coaching career^{3}
Years	Club	Games (W–L–D)
2004–2008	North Adelaide	111 (66–44–1)
2009–2010	Perth	40 (11–28–1)
- ^{1} Playing statistics correct to the end of 1997.^{3} Coaching statistics correct as of 2010.

Career highlights
- AFL & SANFL: 2× Magarey Medal: 1987, 1997; 2× All-Australian team: 1986, 1987; 2× North Adelaide Best and Fairest: 1985, 1989; Norwood Best and Fairest: 1997; SANFL Premiership: 1987, 1997; Adelaide Team of the Decade – Centre; North Adelaide Team of the Century (centre); South Australian Football Hall of Fame; Representative: 2× National Football Carnival Championship: 1988, 1993; 5× Fos Williams Medal: 1986, 1987, 1989, 1990, 1994

Andrew Newton Jarman (born 14 January 1966) is a former professional Australian rules footballer who played for the Adelaide Football Club in the Australian Football League (AFL), and the North Adelaide Football Club and Norwood Football Club in the South Australian National Football League (SANFL). He is the older brother of Adelaide legend Darren Jarman and has won the Magarey Medal twice.

== Career ==
=== SANFL ===
Jarman made his debut with North Adelaide in 1983 at 17 years of age, and quickly established himself as an elite player with superb skills especially when disposing by handball. He won the first of his two club best and fairest awards in 1985. He capped a superb 1987 season with his first Magarey Medal, and played a key role in North Adelaide's premiership victory against Glenelg. The Tigers were aiming for a third consecutive premiership, and had defeated North in two previous Grand Finals.

After winning his second club best and fairest in 1989, Jarman left the Roosters and joined Norwood. He would spend 1990 with the Redlegs before the formation of the Adelaide Crows in late 1990 saw him one of the first players signed. He would not play another SANFL game until 1994 when he made his return from injury with the Redlegs.

After being one of a number of older players de-listed by the Crows and their new coach Malcolm Blight before the 1997 AFL season, Jarman returned to the SANFL in 1997 for Norwood. "Jars" enjoyed a carbon-copy of his watershed 1987 season, winning both the Magarey Medal (shared with Sturt's Brodie Atkinson, another former North Adelaide player) and his second Premiership win as Norwood defeated Port Adelaide in the Grand Final.

In 2001 Jarman was named in the centre position of the North Adelaide Football Club Team of the Century and awarded Life Membership in 2006.

In 2007 Jarman was inducted into the South Australian Football Hall of Fame.

=== AFL ===
Inevitably, the Jarman brothers attracted the interest of clubs in the Victorian Football League (VFL).

Andrew was targeted by Geelong and Melbourne as early as 1986, although both knew a clearance was not going to be granted. In 1987 he was drafted by the second-season Brisbane Bears, but would never move to Queensland, despite promising to do so under Paul Feltham.

Jarman's patience was rewarded when Adelaide entered the League, now known as the AFL, and he became one of the first players signed by coach Graham Cornes. Ironically, the Round 1 debut for both himself and the fledgling club pitted him against his brother Darren Jarman who was making his AFL debut with Hawthorn. The Crows went on to win the game by 86 points 24.11 (155) to 9.15 (69). Jarman was listed among the best afield; he gathered 29 disposals (15 kicks and 14 handpasses), took four marks and kicked a goal. For his efforts, he earned three Brownlow Medal votes.

The 1996 AFL season, the centenary year of the League, would turn out to be Jarman's last. The season started out spectacularly enough, especially as younger brother Darren had moved back to Adelaide from Hawthorn. In Round 2 against Fitzroy at Whitten Oval, the Jarman brothers put on a memorable performance; they kicked 14 of the team's 21 goals – Darren kicked eight, Andrew six. Strangely, neither of them earned a single Brownlow vote. But Adelaide's form dropped sharply in the middle of the season, and after losing to Melbourne in Adelaide in Round 13, Jarman was dropped. When the late withdrawal of Matt Collins opened up a place in the side, he declined to join the team in Melbourne and instead played for Norwood. Jarman was fined and suspended. The club's decision not to sack him outright took into account his five-and-a-half years of service, 100-plus games and the recent awarding of life membership.

After six successful seasons with the Crows, Jarman was one of the high-profile senior players delisted at the end of the 1996 season following the arrival of coach Malcolm Blight. Jarman was awarded Life Membership of the club shortly afterward. Despite speculation that Jarman would be named on Port Adelaide's inaugural AFL list for season 1997 this did not eventuate.

Jarman was named in the centre position of the Adelaide Crows Team of the Decade in 2000.

=== State of Origin ===
Andrew Jarman had a prolific State of Origin career for South Australia, winning the Fos Williams Medal on 5 occasions, (1986, 1987, 1989, 1990 and 1994), and playing in 2 State of Origin Carnival Championships.

Jarman was rewarded for his efforts in State games for South Australia with his selection in the All-Australian team in 1986 and 1987.

Jarman was a big supporter of State of Origin, and spoke passionately about South Australia's rivalry with Victoria, quoted as saying "it was the Mother of all battles".

== Coaching career ==
In 2004, Jarman returned to his first club North Adelaide as senior coach. They had finished at the bottom of the ladder in 2003, but in his first year in charge, Jarman coached the Roosters to their first finals campaign in seven years. Under Jarman's coaching the Roosters showed continual improvement, finishing 5th in 2004, 4th in 2005, 3rd in 2006, 2nd in 2007 then 7th in 2008. On 10 September 2008 Andrew Jarman was sacked as coach of North Adelaide following the club's fall from 2nd to 7th in one season. In October 2008, Jarman was appointed senior coach of Perth in the Western Australian Football League (WAFL), replacing Simon Eastaugh. It was hoped that Jarman would be able to repeat his efforts in lifting a struggling team into finals contention. Despite a respectable finish, Perth failed to make the finals in their first season with Jarman as senior coach. After a last place finish in 2010 and on the verge of being dismissed, Jarman returned to South Australia where he now works on radio. Jarman was appointed coach of the Ironbank in the HFL on 17 October 2013. Jarman joined the Port Noarlunga Football Club in 2023 finishing 6th in his first year. In 2024 his team moved to 3rd on the ladder, beginning to rebuild their status as an SFL powerhouse. Come 2025 after finishing 2nd, his team played Happy Valley in the Grand Final defeating them by 2 points. At the conclusion of the 2025 season Jarman stepped down as A grade coach after ending the 28-year drought, etching himself into cocklediver folklore.

== Criticism of SANFL ==
In September 2012, Jarman called for a wide-ranging review of the SANFL in the face of falling crowd numbers, the SANFL on the verge of selling its two AFL licenses and searching for a new football general manager.

He also called for a return to an attacking style of football, citing the negative, defensive style of play in the low scoring semi-final between Norwood and West Adelaide as damaging to the brand of South Australian football:

From an outsider looking in, I thought it hurt the integrity of our competition because it's about entertainment. I understand the mandate for clubs is to win and win at all costs, but these coaches have a moral responsibility to play attacking, entertaining, tough, one-on-one contested footy with good skill. They have a responsibility to the competition. I know I've had my day and my philosophies are different to theirs. But 10,000 people turned up (to the above-mentioned semi-final) and that type of footy would get 5000 the next week because half of them won't turn up.

The grand final between Norwood and West Adelaide had a crowd of 29,661.

== Personal life ==
Jarman met his wife Marion Wood for the first time in 1986. She had gone to school with Jarman's cousin and accepted an invitation to meet him. Not being a football fan, it was not until some weeks later when she saw his picture in a football magazine, that she realised who he was. They married in 1989, and have one son, Stefan, and two daughters, Charlie and Riley.
