= 2000 SANFL season =

- Teams: 9
- Premiers: Central District; 1st premiership
- Minor premiers: Woodville-West Torrens; 3rd minor premiership
- Magarey Medallist: Damian Squire; Sturt (21 votes)
- Ken Farmer Medallist: Adam Richardson; West Adelaide (72 Goals)

Attendance
- Matches played: 96
- Total attendance: 349,088 (3,636 per match)
- Highest: 34,819 (Grand Final, Central District vs. Woodville-West Torrens)

The 2000 South Australian National Football League season was the 121st season of the top-level Australian rules football competition in South Australia.

== Ladder ==
2000 SANFL Ladder
Pos	Team	Pld	W	L	D	PF	PA	PP	Pts
1	Woodville-West Torrens	20	17	3	0	2308	1427	61.79	34
2	Central District (P)	20	14	6	0	2325	1660	58.34	28
3	Port Adelaide	20	13	7	0	2057	1776	53.67	26
4	Sturt	20	12	8	0	1976	1850	51.65	24
5	Norwood	20	10	10	0	1932	1819	51.51	20
6	South Adelaide	20	9	10	1	1791	1920	48.26	19
7	West Adelaide	20	8	12	0	1775	2025	46.71	16
8	North Adelaide	20	3	16	1	1536	2483	38.22	7
9	Glenelg	20	3	17	0	1446	2186	39.81	6

Rules for classification: 1) points; 2) percentage; 3) number of points for.
(P) Premiers

== Grand final ==
2000 SANFL Grand Final
Sunday 10 September (2:10 pm)	Central District	def.	Woodville-West Torrens	Football Park (crowd: 34,819)
0.5 (5); 3.8 (26); 7.10 (52); 8.13 (61)	Q1; Q2; Q3; Final	0.3 (3); 3.5 (23); 3.6 (24); 5.9 (39)
