= 1988 SANFL season =

- Teams: 10
- Premiers: Port Adelaide; 28th premiership
- Minor premiers: Port Adelaide; 40th minor premiership
- Magarey Medallist: Greg Whittlesea; Sturt (28 votes)
- Ken Farmer Medallist: Stephen Nichols; Woodville (103 Goals)

Attendance
- Matches played: 116
- Total attendance: 967,595 (8,341 per match)
- Highest: 50,313 (Grand Final, Port Adelaide vs. Glenelg)

The 1988 South Australian National Football League season was the 109th season of the top-level Australian rules football competition in South Australia.

== Ladder ==
1988 SANFL Ladder
Pos	Team	Pld	W	L	D	PF	PA	PP	Pts
1	Port Adelaide (P)	22	16	6	0	2426	1903	56.04	32
2	Central District	22	15	6	1	2572	1923	57.22	31
3	Norwood	22	14	8	0	2384	1808	56.87	28
4	Glenelg	22	13	9	0	2456	1854	56.98	26
5	Sturt	22	13	9	0	2458	2284	51.83	26
6	North Adelaide	22	11	10	1	2182	1983	52.39	23
7	Woodville	22	9	13	0	2350	2594	47.53	18
8	West Adelaide	22	9	13	0	2112	2403	46.78	18
9	West Torrens	22	8	14	0	1986	2488	44.39	16
10	South Adelaide	22	1	21	0	1540	3226	32.31	2

Rules for classification: 1) points; 2) percentage; 3) number of points for.
(P) Premiers

== Grand final ==
1988 SANFL Grand Final
Saturday 1 October (2:10 pm)	Port Adelaide	def.	Glenelg	Football Park (crowd: 50,313)
0.2 (2); 4.6 (30); 7.10 (52); 12.12 (84)	Q1; Q2; Q3; Final	3.3 (21); 3.5 (23); 4.7 (31); 8.7 (55)
