= Martin Leslie (Australian footballer) =

Australian rules footballer

Personal information
- Born: 17 November 1962 (age 63)
- Original team: Ethelton
- Draft: No. 1, 1986 national draft
- Debut: Round 1, 1989, Brisbane vs. St Kilda, at Moorabbin Oval
- Height: 187 cm (6 ft 2 in)
- Weight: 90 kg (198 lb)

Playing career^{1}
Years	Club	Games (Goals)
1981–1988	Port Adelaide (SANFL)	150
1989–1995	Brisbane Bears (VFL/AFL)	107 (11)
- ^{1} Playing statistics correct to the end of 1995.

Career highlights
- Port Adelaide premiership player (1988); Port Adelaide best and fairest: 1986; Brisbane Bears Club Champion: 1990; All-Australian team: 1988

Martin Leslie (born 17 November 1962) is a former Australian rules footballer who played for the Brisbane Bears in the Australian Football League (AFL) and Port Adelaide Football Club in the South Australian National Football League (SANFL).

Leslie made his SANFL debut for Port Adelaide in 1981, winning the club best and fairest award in 1986 and a premiership in 1988.

At the VFL National Draft in 1986 Leslie was the number one draft choice, selected by Brisbane. Leslie deferred moving to Brisbane until the end of the 1988 SANFL season. Making his VFL debut in 1989, Leslie would eventually play 107 games for the Bears and won their best and fairest award, in 1990. Leslie retired at the end of the 1995 AFL season.
