= 2008 SANFL season =

- Teams: 9
- Premiers: Central District; 7th premiership
- Minor premiers: Glenelg; 4th minor premiership
- Magarey Medallist: Luke Crane; Sturt (22 votes)
- Ken Farmer Medallist: Brant Chambers; Sturt (97 Goals)
- Matches played: 96
- Highest: 34,128 (Grand Final, Central District vs. Glenelg)

The 2008 South Australian National Football League season was the 129th season of the top-level Australian rules football competition in South Australia.

== Premiership season ==
=== Round 1 ===
	Round 1
Friday 28 March (7:40 pm)	Norwood 4.12 (36)	def. by	Sturt 14.12 (96)	Norwood Oval
Saturday 29 March (2:10 pm)	North Adelaide 17.14 (116)	def.	Woodville-West Torrens 18.2 (110)	Prospect Oval
Saturday 29 March (2:10 pm)	Central District 14.4 (88)	def.	Port Adelaide 10.8 (68)	Elizabeth Oval
Sunday 30 March (2:10 pm)	South Adelaide 15.7 (97)	def.	Glenelg 12.11 (83)	Hickinbotham Oval
Bye: West Adelaide

=== Round 2 ===
	Round 2
Saturday 5 April (2:10 pm)	Glenelg 19.16 (130)	def.	Woodville-West Torrens 13.10 (88)	Glenelg Oval
Saturday 5 April (2:10 pm)	Port Adelaide 14.18 (102)	def. by	South Adelaide 16.9 (105)	Alberton Oval
Saturday 5 April (2:10 pm)	Sturt 17.15 (117)	def.	Central District 11.7 (73)	Unley Oval
Saturday 5 April (2:10 pm)	West Adelaide 9.11 (65)	def. by	Norwood 13.20 (98)	Richmond Oval
Bye: North Adelaide

=== Round 3 ===
	Round 3
Saturday 12 April (2:10 pm)	Woodville-West Torrens 12.10 (82)	def. by	Port Adelaide 19.11 (125)	Woodville Oval
Saturday 12 April (2:10 pm)	North Adelaide 8.8 (56)	def. by	Sturt 17.14 (116)	Prospect Oval
Saturday 12 April (2:10 pm)	South Adelaide 9.11 (65)	def.	West Adelaide 9.7 (61)	Hickinbotham Oval
Saturday 12 April (2:10 pm)	Central District 17.13 (115)	def.	Norwood 6.8 (44)	Elizabeth Oval
Bye: Glenelg

=== Round 4 ===
	Round 4
Friday 18 April (7:40 pm)	Norwood 14.17 (101)	def. by	Woodville-West Torrens 21.10 (136)	Norwood Oval
Saturday 19 April (2:10 pm)	South Adelaide 4.6 (30)	def. by	Sturt 17.13 (115)	Hickinbotham Oval
Sunday 20 April (2:10 pm)	Glenelg 17.19 (121)	def.	West Adelaide 9.13 (67)	Glenelg Oval
Sunday 20 April (2:10 pm)	Port Adelaide 13.15 (93)	def. by	North Adelaide 14.11 (95)	Alberton Oval
Bye: Central District

=== Round 5 ===
	Round 5
Friday 25 April (2:10 pm)	Central District 12.12 (84)	def.	North Adelaide 9.11 (65)	Adelaide Oval
Friday 25 April (2:10 pm)	Norwood 11.12 (78)	drew with	South Adelaide 11.12 (78)	Norwood Oval
Saturday 26 April (2:10 pm)	Sturt 13.12 (90)	def. by	Glenelg 15.14 (104)	Unley Oval
Saturday 26 April (2:10 pm)	West Adelaide 9.13 (67)	def. by	Woodville-West Torrens 17.7 (109)	Richmond Oval
Bye: Port Adelaide

=== Round 6 ===
	Round 6
Saturday 3 May (2:10 pm)	Woodville-West Torrens 18.9 (117)	def.	Sturt 12.10 (82)	Thebarton Oval
Saturday 3 May (2:10 pm)	North Adelaide 24.14 (158)	def.	South Adelaide 8.11 (59)	Prospect Oval
Saturday 3 May (2:10 pm)	Port Adelaide 17.12 (114)	def.	West Adelaide 13.12 (90)	Alberton Oval
Sunday 4 May (2:10 pm)	Glenelg 13.15 (93)	def.	Central District 13.12 (90)	Glenelg Oval
Bye: Norwood

=== Round 7 ===
	Round 7
Friday 9 May (7:40 pm)	Norwood 12.17 (89)	def.	Port Adelaide 10.7 (67)	Norwood Oval
Saturday 10 May (2:10 pm)	Sturt 22.7 (139)	def.	West Adelaide 5.10 (40)	Unley Oval
Saturday 10 May (2:10 pm)	Glenelg 22.11 (143)	def.	North Adelaide 18.9 (117)	Glenelg Oval
Saturday 10 May (2:10 pm)	Central District 12.12 (84)	def.	Woodville-West Torrens 10.7 (67)	Elizabeth Oval
Bye: South Adelaide

=== Round 8 ===
	Round 8
Saturday 17 May (2:10 pm)	North Adelaide 9.9 (63)	def. by	Norwood 13.13 (91)	Prospect Oval
Saturday 17 May (2:10 pm)	Sturt 12.9 (81)	def.	Port Adelaide 7.13 (55)	Unley Oval
Saturday 17 May (2:10 pm)	South Adelaide 5.8 (38)	def. by	Glenelg 16.10 (106)	Hickinbotham Oval
Saturday 17 May (2:10 pm)	West Adelaide 7.5 (47)	def. by	Central District 12.8 (80)	Richmond Oval
Bye: Woodville-West Torrens

=== Round 9 ===
	Round 9
Friday 23 May (7:40 pm)	Norwood 1.3 (9)	def. by	Glenelg 13.15 (93)	Norwood Oval
Saturday 24 May (2:10 pm)	Woodville-West Torrens 15.9 (99)	def. by	North Adelaide 18.11 (119)	Woodville Oval
Saturday 24 May (2:10 pm)	West Adelaide 11.14 (80)	def.	South Adelaide 8.10 (58)	Richmond Oval
Sunday 25 May (2:10 pm)	Port Adelaide 11.7 (73)	def. by	Central District 22.11 (143)	Alberton Oval
Bye: Sturt

=== Round 10 ===
	Round 10
Saturday 7 June (2:10 pm)	Central District 18.11 (119)	def.	South Adelaide 13.10 (88)	Elizabeth Oval
Saturday 7 June (2:10 pm)	Woodville-West Torrens 11.9 (75)	def. by	Norwood 19.12 (126)	Woodville Oval
Monday 9 June (2:10 pm)	Glenelg 15.21 (111)	def.	Port Adelaide 14.9 (93)	Glenelg Oval
Monday 9 June (2:10 pm)	Sturt 27.12 (174)	def.	North Adelaide 10.8 (68)	Unley Oval
Bye: West Adelaide

=== Round 11 ===
	Round 11
Saturday 14 June (2:10 pm)	North Adelaide 19.13 (127)	def.	West Adelaide 10.14 (74)	Prospect Oval
Sunday 15 June (2:10 pm)	South Adelaide 15.10 (100)	def. by	Woodville-West Torrens 17.8 (110)	Hickinbotham Oval
Sunday 15 June (2:10 pm)	Sturt 15.17 (107)	def.	Norwood 14.6 (90)	Unley Oval
Bye: Central District, Glenelg, Port Adelaide

=== Round 12 ===
	Round 12
Saturday 21 June (2:10 pm)	Central District 12.10 (82)	def. by	Glenelg 15.13 (103)	Elizabeth Oval
Saturday 21 June (2:10 pm)	Woodville-West Torrens 6.12 (48)	def. by	Sturt 19.15 (129)	Woodville Oval
Saturday 21 June (2:10 pm)	North Adelaide 15.11 (101)	def.	South Adelaide 8.6 (54)	Prospect Oval
Sunday 22 June (2:10 pm)	West Adelaide 8.9 (57)	def. by	Port Adelaide 13.15 (93)	Richmond Oval
Bye: Norwood

=== Round 13 ===
	Round 13
Saturday 28 June (2:10 pm)	Woodville-West Torrens 18.14 (122)	def.	Central District 5.8 (38)	Woodville Oval
Saturday 28 June (2:10 pm)	Norwood 17.10 (112)	def.	West Adelaide 10.14 (74)	Norwood Oval
Saturday 28 June (2:10 pm)	Port Adelaide 11.10 (76)	def.	North Adelaide 10.12 (72)	Alberton Oval
Saturday 28 June (2:10 pm)	Glenelg 10.13 (73)	def.	Sturt 9.11 (65)	Glenelg Oval
Bye: South Adelaide

=== Round 14 ===
	Round 14
Saturday 5 July (2:10 pm)	South Adelaide 11.6 (72)	def. by	Norwood 11.19 (85)	Hickinbotham Oval
Saturday 5 July (2:10 pm)	Port Adelaide 11.12 (78)	def.	Woodville-West Torrens 8.7 (55)	Alberton Oval
Saturday 5 July (2:10 pm)	Central District 16.11 (107)	def.	West Adelaide 9.7 (61)	Elizabeth Oval
Sunday 6 July (2:10 pm)	North Adelaide 7.12 (54)	def. by	Glenelg 17.9 (111)	Prospect Oval
Bye: Sturt

=== Round 15 ===
	Round 15
Saturday 12 July (2:10 pm)	Norwood 17.11 (113)	def.	North Adelaide 6.11 (47)	Norwood Oval
Saturday 12 July (2:10 pm)	West Adelaide 4.9 (33)	def. by	Glenelg 13.13 (91)	Richmond Oval
Saturday 12 July (2:10 pm)	Central District 8.11 (59)	def.	Port Adelaide 7.10 (52)	Elizabeth Oval
Sunday 13 July (2:10 pm)	Sturt 15.20 (110)	def.	South Adelaide 5.10 (40)	Johnstone Park
Bye: Woodville-West Torrens

=== Round 16 ===
	Round 16
Saturday 19 July (2:10 pm)	West Adelaide 8.13 (61)	def. by	Sturt 19.7 (121)	Richmond Oval
Saturday 19 July (2:10 pm)	Norwood 12.12 (84)	def. by	Central District 13.8 (86)	Norwood Oval
Saturday 19 July (2:10 pm)	North Adelaide 11.16 (82)	def.	Woodville-West Torrens 9.10 (64)	Prospect Oval
Saturday 19 July (2:10 pm)	Glenelg 14.12 (96)	def. by	South Adelaide 17.7 (109)	Glenelg Oval
Bye: Port Adelaide

=== Round 17 ===
	Round 17
Saturday 26 July (2:10 pm)	Sturt 14.10 (94)	def.	Central District 12.9 (81)	Unley Oval
Saturday 26 July (2:10 pm)	South Adelaide 9.8 (62)	def. by	Port Adelaide 15.14 (104)	Hickinbotham Oval
Saturday 26 July (2:10 pm)	Glenelg 19.7 (121)	def.	Norwood 11.10 (76)	Glenelg Oval
Saturday 26 July (2:10 pm)	Woodville-West Torrens 14.13 (97)	def.	West Adelaide 8.12 (60)	Thebarton Oval
Bye: North Adelaide

=== Round 18 ===
	Round 18
Saturday 2 August (2:10 pm)	Central District 15.9 (99)	def.	Glenelg 8.6 (54)	Elizabeth Oval
Saturday 2 August (2:10 pm)	South Adelaide 12.9 (81)	def.	North Adelaide 10.13 (73)	Hickinbotham Oval
Sunday 3 August (2:10 pm)	Sturt 13.12 (90)	def.	Woodville-West Torrens 11.8 (74)	Unley Oval
Sunday 3 August (2:10 pm)	Port Adelaide 16.13 (109)	def.	Norwood 12.13 (85)	Alberton Oval
Bye: West Adelaide

=== Round 19 ===
	Round 19
Saturday 9 August (2:10 pm)	West Adelaide 4.7 (31)	def. by	Port Adelaide 6.10 (46)	Richmond Oval
Saturday 9 August (2:10 pm)	Norwood 11.9 (75)	def.	Sturt 4.7 (31)	Norwood Oval
Saturday 9 August (2:10 pm)	North Adelaide 14.11 (95)	def.	Central District 6.9 (45)	Prospect Oval
Saturday 9 August (2:10 pm)	Woodville-West Torrens 10.7 (67)	def.	South Adelaide 5.4 (34)	Woodville Oval
Bye: Glenelg

=== Round 20 ===
	Round 20
Saturday 16 August (2:10 pm)	South Adelaide 3.8 (26)	def. by	West Adelaide 12.18 (90)	Hickinbotham Oval
Sunday 17 August (2:10 pm)	Port Adelaide 9.9 (63)	def. by	Sturt 13.13 (91)	Alberton Oval
Sunday 17 August (2:10 pm)	Glenelg 16.12 (108)	def.	North Adelaide 12.7 (79)	Glenelg Oval
Bye: Central District, Norwood, Woodville-West Torrens

=== Round 21 ===
	Round 21
Thursday 21 August (7:40 pm)	Norwood 9.22 (76)	def.	West Adelaide 9.10 (64)	Norwood Oval
Saturday 23 August (2:10 pm)	South Adelaide 9.9 (63)	def. by	Central District 14.13 (97)	Hickinbotham Oval
Saturday 23 August (2:10 pm)	Woodville-West Torrens 11.12 (78)	def.	Glenelg 9.12 (66)	Woodville Oval
Sunday 24 August (2:10 pm)	North Adelaide 11.7 (73)	def. by	Port Adelaide 21.7 (133)	Prospect Oval
Bye: Sturt

=== Round 22 ===
	Round 22
Saturday 30 August (2:10 pm)	Woodville-West Torrens 17.11 (113)	def.	Norwood 8.8 (56)	Woodville Oval
Sunday 31 August (2:10 pm)	Port Adelaide 5.9 (39)	def. by	Glenelg 13.14 (92)	Alberton Oval
Sunday 31 August (2:10 pm)	West Adelaide 9.8 (62)	def. by	Central District 17.10 (112)	Richmond Oval
Sunday 31 August (2:10 pm)	Sturt 21.18 (144)	def.	South Adelaide 3.5 (23)	Unley Oval
Bye: North Adelaide

=== Round 23 ===
	Round 23
Saturday 6 September (2:10 pm)	Central District 14.5 (89)	def.	Sturt 11.7 (73)	Elizabeth Oval
Sunday 7 September (2:10 pm)	West Adelaide 4.11 (35)	def. by	North Adelaide 15.11 (101)	Richmond Oval
Sunday 7 September (2:10 pm)	Port Adelaide 16.13 (109)	def.	Woodville-West Torrens 8.12 (60)	Alberton Oval
Sunday 7 September (2:10 pm)	Glenelg 11.14 (80)	def.	Norwood 9.7 (61)	Glenelg Oval
Bye: South Adelaide

== Ladder ==
2008 SANFL Ladder
Pos	Team	Pld	W	L	D	PF	PA	PP	Pts
1	Glenelg	20	16	4	0	1979	1464	57.48	32
2	Sturt	20	15	5	0	2065	1296	61.44	30
3	Central District (P)	20	14	6	0	1771	1525	53.73	28
4	Port Adelaide	20	10	10	0	1692	1621	51.07	20
5	Norwood	20	9	10	1	1585	1692	48.37	19
6	Woodville-West Torrens	20	9	11	0	1771	1792	49.71	18
7	North Adelaide	20	9	11	0	1761	1863	48.59	18
8	South Adelaide	20	5	14	1	1282	1979	39.31	11
9	West Adelaide	20	2	18	0	1219	1893	39.17	4

Rules for classification: 1) points; 2) percentage; 3) number of points for.
(P) Premiers

== Finals series ==
=== Week one – Qualifying and elimination finals ===
	Elimination final
Sunday 14 September (12:15 pm)	Port Adelaide 15.8 (98)	def. by	Norwood 18.11 (119)	Adelaide Oval (crowd: See below)

	Qualifying final
Sunday 14 September (3:15 pm)	Sturt 9.10 (64)	def. by	Central District 9.13 (67)	Adelaide Oval (crowd: 15,825)

=== Week two – Semi-finals ===
	First Semi-final
Sunday 21 September (12:15 pm)	Sturt 19.19 (123)	def.	Norwood 9.8 (62)	Adelaide Oval (crowd: See below)

	Second Semi-final
Sunday 21 September (3:15 pm)	Glenelg 11.9 (75)	def. by	Central District 16.9 (105)	Adelaide Oval (crowd: 22,568)

=== Week three – Preliminary final ===
	Preliminary final
Sunday 28 September (3:15 pm)	Glenelg 17.17 (119)	def.	Sturt 8.5 (53)	Adelaide Oval (crowd: 13,846)

== Grand final ==
2008 SANFL Grand Final
Sunday 5 October (2:10 pm)	Central District	def.	Glenelg	Football Park (crowd: 34,128)
3.2 (20); 5.4 (34); 12.8 (80); 17.11 (113)	Q1; Q2; Q3; Final	3.1 (19); 4.6 (30); 6.7 (43); 10.11 (71)
