= 1989 SANFL season =

- Teams: 10
- Premiers: Port Adelaide; 29th premiership
- Minor premiers: North Adelaide; 15th minor premiership
- Magarey Medallist: Gilbert McAdam; Central District
- Ken Farmer Medallist: Rudi Mandemaker; Central District (93 goals)

Attendance
- Matches played: 116
- Total attendance: 901,651 (7,773 per match)
- Highest: 50,487 (Grand Final, Port Adelaide vs. North Adelaide)

The 1989 South Australian National Football League season was the 110th season of the top-level Australian rules football competition in South Australia.

== Ladder ==
1989 SANFL Ladder
Pos	Team	Pld	W	L	D	PF	PA	PP	Pts
1	North Adelaide	22	19	3	0	2513	1585	61.32	38
2	Port Adelaide (P)	22	18	4	0	2529	1818	58.18	36
3	Central District	22	13	9	0	2156	2187	49.64	26
4	Norwood	22	12	10	0	2180	1975	52.47	24
5	Glenelg	22	12	10	0	2033	2030	50.04	24
6	West Torrens	22	10	12	0	1879	2179	46.30	20
7	West Adelaide	22	8	14	0	2167	2301	48.50	16
8	Woodville	22	8	14	0	1985	2223	47.17	16
9	South Adelaide	22	6	16	0	1796	2352	43.30	12
10	Sturt	22	4	18	0	1781	2369	42.92	8

Rules for classification: 1) points; 2) percentage; 3) number of points for.
(P) Premiers

== Grand final ==
1989 SANFL Grand Final
Saturday 7 October (2:10 pm)	Port Adelaide	def.	North Adelaide	Football Park (crowd: 50,487)
5.5 (35); 9.7 (61); 11.11 (77); 15.18 (108)	Q1; Q2; Q3; Final	0.2 (2); 0.3 (3); 1.6 (12); 1.8 (14)
