= 2012 SANFL season =

- Teams: 9
- Premiers: Norwood; 28th premiership
- Minor premiers: Norwood; 17th minor premiership
- Magarey Medallist: Joel Cross; South Adelaide (18 votes); Brad Symes; Central District (18 votes)
- Ken Farmer Medallist: Justin Hardy; Central District (59 goals)

Attendance
- Matches played: 96
- Total attendance: 311,551 (3,245 per match)
- Highest: 29,661 (Grand Final, Norwood vs. West Adelaide)

The 2012 South Australian National Football League season was the 133rd season of the top-level Australian rules football competition in South Australia. The season opened on Friday 23 March with a night match between Woodville-West Torrens and Port Adelaide, and concluded on Sunday 7 October with the Grand Final in which Norwood (minor premiers) won its 28th premiership by defeating West Adelaide (third at the end of the minor rounds).

Central District, North Adelaide and Woodville-West Torrens also made the top (final) five teams and participated in the finals matches, with Central District failing to make the Grand Final for the first time since 2000. Glenelg, Port Adelaide, South Adelaide and Sturt all missed the top five, with the latter finishing last to win its 20th wooden spoon.

== Premiership season ==
=== Round 1 ===
| | Round 1 |
| Friday, 23 March (7:40 pm) | Woodville-West Torrens 10.6 (66) | def. by | Port Adelaide 18.13 (121) | Thebarton Oval (crowd: 4,566) | Report |
| Saturday, 24 March (7:45 pm) | South Adelaide 5.13 (43) | def. by | West Adelaide 12.9 (81) | Hickinbotham Oval (crowd: 1,929) | Report |
| | Bye; Central District, Glenelg, North Adelaide, Norwood, Sturt |

=== Round 2 ===
| | Round 2 |
| Saturday, 31 March (2:10 pm) | North Adelaide 15.14 (104) | def. by | South Adelaide 18.11 (119) | Prospect Oval (crowd: 2,173) | Report |
| Saturday, 31 March (2:10 pm) | Sturt 17.8 (110) | def. | Port Adelaide 15.14 (104) | Unley Oval (crowd: 3,365) | Report |
| Saturday, 31 March (6:30 pm) | Central District 7.4 (46) | def. by | Norwood 9.12 (66) | Elizabeth Oval (crowd: 4,026) | Report |
| Saturday, 31 March (6:30 pm) | Glenelg 11.13 (79) | def. | West Adelaide 7.15 (57) | Glenelg Oval (crowd: 6,047) | Report |
| | Bye; Woodville-West Torrens |

=== Round 3 ===
| | Round 3 |
| Thursday, 5 April (7:50 pm) | West Adelaide 10.10 (70) | def. | Central District 7.12 (54) | Richmond Oval (crowd: 2,890) | Report |
| Friday, 6 April (1:45 pm) | South Adelaide 14.11 (95) | def. by | Sturt 16.12 (108) | Hickinbotham Oval (crowd: 4,219) | Report |
| Saturday, 7 April (1:40 pm) | Norwood 19.14 (128) | def. | Woodville-West Torrens 5.5 (35) | Norwood Oval (crowd: 3,469) | Report |
| Saturday, 7 April (2:40 pm) | North Adelaide 9.6 (60) | def. by | Glenelg 17.14 (116) | Prospect Oval (crowd: 2,521) | Report |
| | Bye; Port Adelaide |

=== Round 4 ===
| | Round 4 |
| Friday, 13 April (7:40 pm) | West Adelaide 11.13 (79) | def. by | North Adelaide 13.8 (86) | Richmond Oval (crowd: 2,499) | Report |
| Saturday, 14 April (2:10 pm) | Woodville-West Torrens 8.10 (58) | def. by | Glenelg 13.12 (90) | Woodville Oval (crowd: 2,326) | Report |
| Saturday, 14 April (2:10 pm) | Central District 20.13 (133) | def. | South Adelaide 14.5 (89) | Elizabeth Oval (crowd: 2,254) | Report |
| Sunday, 15 April (2:10 pm) | Port Adelaide 11.12 (78) | def. by | Norwood 18.11 (119) | Alberton Oval (crowd: 4,796) | Report |
| | Bye; Sturt |

=== Round 5 ===
| | Round 5 |
| Friday, 20 April (7:20 pm) | Glenelg 11.16 (82) | def. by | South Adelaide 17.7 (109) | Glenelg Oval (crowd: 4,973) | Report |
| Saturday, 21 April (2:10 pm) | Port Adelaide 11.9 (75) | def. by | Central District 16.8 (104) | Alberton Oval (crowd: 2,603) | Report |
| Saturday, 21 April(2:10 pm) | North Adelaide 19.7 (121) | def. | Woodville-West Torrens 5.12 (42) | Prospect Oval (crowd: 1,580) | Report |
| Saturday, 21 April (2:10 pm) | Sturt 6.15 (51) | def. by | West Adelaide 10.12 (72) | Unley Oval (crowd: 2,134) | Report |
| | Bye; Norwood |

=== Round 6 ===
| | Round 6 |
| Wednesday, 25 April (3:10 pm) | Woodville-West Torrens 12.6 (78) | def. by | Central District 13.6 (84) | Woodville Oval (crowd: 4,054) | Report |
| Friday, 27 April (7:20 pm) | Glenelg 17.10 (112) | def. | Sturt 9.9 (63) | Glenelg Oval (crowd: 5,820) | Report |
| Friday, 27 April (7:40 pm) | Norwood 14.15 (99) | def. | North Adelaide 9.6 (60) | Norwood Oval (crowd: 5,021) | Report |
| Saturday, 28 April (2:10 pm) | South Adelaide 21.10 (136) | def. | Port Adelaide 17.14 (116) | Hickinbotham Oval (crowd: 1,697) | Report |
| | Bye; West Adelaide |

=== Round 7 ===
| | Round 7 |
| Friday, 4 May (7:40 pm) | Norwood 17.10 (112) | def. | Glenelg 9.5 (59) | Norwood Oval (crowd: 5,551) | Report |
| Friday, 4 May (7:40 pm) | South Adelaide 8.9 (57) | def. by | Woodville-West Torrens 13.5 (83) | Hickinbotham Oval (crowd: 1,659) | Report |
| Saturday, 5 May (2:10 pm) | West Adelaide 15.12 (102) | def. | Port Adelaide 10.7 (67) | Richmond Oval (crowd: 2,315) | Report |
| Saturday, 5 May (2:10 pm) | Sturt 13.11 (89) | def. by | North Adelaide 15.11 (101) | Unley Oval (crowd: 2,599) | Report |
| | Bye; Central District |

=== Round 8 ===
| | Round 8 |
| Friday, 11 May (7:40 pm) | Norwood 13.8 (86) | def. | West Adelaide 5.9 (39) | Norwood Oval (crowd: 4,641) | Report |
| Saturday, 12 May (6:30 pm) | Port Adelaide 13.11 (89) | def. | North Adelaide 11.13 (79) | Alberton Oval (crowd: 2,253) | Report |
| Saturday, 12 May (6:30 pm) | Central District 20.7 (127) | def. | Glenelg 8.4 (52) | Elizabeth Oval (crowd: 2,566) | Report |
| Sunday, 13 May (2:10 pm) | Woodville-West Torrens 11.15 (81) | def. | Sturt 11.6 (72) | Woodville Oval (crowd: 2,038) | Report |
| | Bye; South Adelaide |

=== Round 9 ===
| | Round 9 |
| Friday, 18 May (7:40 pm) | Glenelg 15.12 (102) | def. | Port Adelaide 13.6 (84) | Glenelg Oval (crowd: 4,766) | Report |
| Saturday, 19 May (2:10 pm) | Sturt 3.14 (32) | def. by | Norwood 10.19 (79) | Unley Oval (crowd: 3,510) | Report |
| Saturday, 19 May (2:10 pm) | North Adelaide 13.7 (85) | def. by | Central District 14.7 (91) | Prospect Oval (crowd: 2,684) | Report |
| Saturday, 19 May (2:10 pm) | West Adelaide 15.9 (99) | def. | South Adelaide 7.9 (51) | Richmond Oval (crowd: 1,508) | Report |
| | Bye; Woodville-West Torrens |

=== Round 10 ===
| | Round 10 |
| Friday, 1 June (7:40 pm) | South Adelaide 12.3 (75) | def. by | Norwood 15.10 (100) | Hickinbotham Oval (crowd: 2,454) | Report |
| Saturday, 2 June (2:10 pm) | West Adelaide 12.11 (83) | def. | Woodville-West Torrens 10.4 (64) | Richmond Oval (crowd: 2,010) | Report |
| Sunday, 3 June (2:10 pm) | Glenelg 12.13 (85) | def. by | North Adelaide 17.10 (112) | Glenelg Oval (crowd: 3,007) | Report |
| Sunday, 3 June (2:10 pm) | Sturt 14.10 (94) | def. | Central District 9.9 (63) | Unley Oval (crowd: 2,483) | Report |
| | Bye; Port Adelaide |

=== Round 11 ===
| | Round 11 |
| Saturday, 9 June (2:10 pm) | Central District 14.9 (93) | def. | West Adelaide 8.8 (56) | Elizabeth Oval (crowd: 2,857) | Report |
| Saturday, 9 June (2:10 pm) | North Adelaide 11.6 (72) | def. | Norwood 10.11 (71) | Prospect Oval (crowd: 4,134) | Report |
| Saturday, 9 June (2:10 pm) | Port Adelaide 18.11 (119) | def. | South Adelaide 12.6 (78) | Alberton Oval (crowd: 2,609) | Report |
| Monday, 11 June (2:10 pm) | Glenelg 18.8 (116) | def. | Woodville-West Torrens 8.21 (69) | Glenelg Oval (crowd: 4,647) | Report |
| | Bye; Sturt |

=== Round 12 ===
| | Round 12 |
| Saturday, 16 June (2:10 pm) | Central District 13.8 (86) | def. | Port Adelaide 11.5 (71) | Elizabeth Oval (crowd: 3,393) | Report |
| Saturday, 16 June (2:10 pm) | Sturt 9.10 (64) | def. by | South Adelaide 15.13 (103) | Unley Oval (crowd: 2,379) | Report |
| Saturday, 16 June (2:10 pm) | Woodville-West Torrens 16.11 (107) | def. | North Adelaide 9.8 (62) | Woodville Oval (crowd: 2,113) | Report |
| Sunday, 17 June (2:10 pm) | Norwood 17.13 (115) | def. | Glenelg 4.2 (26) | Norwood Oval (crowd: 3,568) | Report |
| | Bye; West Adelaide |

=== Round 13 ===
| | Round 13 |
| Saturday, 23 June (2:10 pm) | Glenelg 9.12 (66) | def. by | Central District 16.13 (109) | Glenelg Oval (crowd: 2,476) | Report |
| Saturday, 23 June (2:10 pm) | North Adelaide 8.10 (58) | def. by | Sturt 18.13 (121) | Prospect Oval (crowd: 2,176) | Report |
| Saturday, 23 June (2:10 pm) | Port Adelaide 8.10 (58) | def. by | Woodville-West Torrens 14.7 (91) | Alberton Oval (crowd: 2,656) | Report |
| Saturday, 23 June (2:10 pm) | West Adelaide 4.12 (36) | def. by | Norwood 5.7 (37) | Richmond Oval (crowd: 2,489) | Report |
| | Bye; South Adelaide |

=== Round 14 – Centacare Multicultural Round ===
| | Round 14 |
| Saturday, 30 June (2:10 pm) | Port Adelaide 5.6 (36) | def. by | West Adelaide 8.5 (53) | Alberton Oval (crowd: 1,985) | Report |
| Saturday, 30 June (2:10 pm) | Central District 16.8 (104) | def. | Woodville-West Torrens 3.7 (25) | Elizabeth Oval (crowd: 1,985) | Report |
| Sunday, 1 July (2:10 pm) | South Adelaide 10.7 (67) | def. by | Glenelg 10.10 (70) | Hickinbotham Oval (crowd: 1,947) | Report |
| Sunday, 1 July (2:10 pm) | Sturt 10.15 (75) | def. by | Norwood 12.11 (83) | Unley Oval (crowd: 3,391) | Report |
| | Bye; North Adelaide |

=== Round 15 ===
| | Round 15 |
| Saturday, 7 July (2:10 pm) | West Adelaide 19.9 (123) | def. | Sturt 7.13 (55) | Richmond Oval (crowd: 2,347) | Report |
| Saturday, 7 July (2:10 pm) | Woodville-West Torrens 8.11 (59) | def. by | South Adelaide 12.6 (78) | Woodville Oval (crowd: 1,772) | Report |
| Sunday, 8 July (2:10 pm) | Norwood 11.11 (77) | def. | Central District 7.12 (54) | Norwood Oval (crowd: 6,353) | Report |
| | Bye; Glenelg, North Adelaide, Port Adelaide |

=== Round 16 ===
| | Round 16 |
| Saturday, 14 July (2:10 pm) | Central District 18.16 (124) | def. | Sturt 5.15 (45) | Elizabeth Oval (crowd: 2,042) | Report |
| Sunday, 15 July (2:10 pm) | North Adelaide 9.8 (62) | def. by | Port Adelaide 16.11 (107) | Prospect Oval (crowd: 2,191) | Report |
| Sunday, 15 July (2:10 pm) | Woodville-West Torrens 13.9 (87) | def. by | Norwood 15.9 (99) | Woodville Oval (crowd: 2,673) | Report |
| | Bye; Glenelg, South Adelaide, West Adelaide |

=== Round 17 ===
| | Round 17 |
| Friday, 20 July (7:40 pm) | West Adelaide 12.16 (88) | def. | Glenelg 11.2 (68) | Richmond Oval (crowd: 2,096) | Report |
| Saturday, 21 July (2:10 pm) | Port Adelaide 16.14 (110) | def. | Central District 7.9 (51) | Alberton Oval (crowd: 2,547) | Report |
| Sunday, 22 July (2:10 pm) | South Adelaide 13.7 (85) | def. by | North Adelaide 13.13 (91) | Hickinbotham Oval (crowd: 1,871) |
| Sunday, 22 July (2:10 pm) | Sturt 12.8 (80) | def. by | Woodville-West Torrens 13.17 (95) | Unley Oval (crowd: 2,482) | Report |
| | Bye; Norwood |

=== Round 18 ===
| | Round 18 |
| Friday, 27 July (7:40 pm) | Norwood 9.19 (73) | def. | Port Adelaide 5.6 (36) | Norwood Oval (crowd: 6,050) | Report |
| Saturday, 28 July (2:10 pm) | Glenelg 11.9 (75) | def. by | Central District 15.19 (109) | Glenelg Oval (crowd: 2,357) | Report |
| Saturday, 28 July (2:10 pm) | North Adelaide 11.11 (77) | def. | West Adelaide 8.9 (57) | Prospect Oval (crowd: 1,720) | Report |
| Sunday, 29 July (2:10 pm) | South Adelaide 14.7 (91) | def. by | Sturt 15.7 (97) | Hickinbotham Oval (crowd: 1,676) | Report |
| | Bye; Woodville-West Torrens |

=== Round 19 ===
| | Round 19 |
| Friday, 3 August (7:40 pm) | Norwood 24.7 (151) | def. | Sturt 4.6 (30) | Norwood Oval (crowd: 4,663) | Report |
| Saturday, 4 August (2:10 pm) | North Adelaide 15.12 (102) | def. | Glenelg 7.10 (50) | Prospect Oval (crowd: 2,019) | Report |
| | Bye; Central District, Port Adelaide, South Adelaide, West Adelaide, Woodville-West Torrens |

=== Round 20 ===
| | Round 20 |
| Friday, 10 August (6:40 pm) | Norwood 14.16 (100) | def. | South Adelaide 10.1 (61) | Norwood Oval (crowd: 3,139) | Report |
| Saturday, 11 August (1:45 pm) | Port Adelaide 16.11 (107) | def. | Glenelg 11.11 (77) | Alberton Oval (crowd: 2,831) | Report |
| Saturday, 11 August (1:40 pm) | Central District 10.10 (70) | def. by | West Adelaide 15.11 (101) | Elizabeth Oval (crowd: 1,986) | Report |
| Sunday, 12 August (1:10 pm) | Woodville-West Torrens 20.14 (134) | def. | North Adelaide 6.6 (42) | Woodville Oval (crowd: 2,514) | Report |
| | Bye; Sturt |

=== Round 21 ===
| | Round 21 |
| Saturday, 18 August (2:10 pm) | West Adelaide 11.8 (74) | def. | Norwood 7.9 (51) | Richmond Oval (crowd: 2,330) | Report |
| Saturday, 18 August (2:10 pm) | Woodville-West Torrens 11.6 (72) | def. | Port Adelaide 11.3 (69) | Woodville Oval (crowd: 2,573) | Report |
| Saturday, 18 August (2:10 pm) | South Adelaide 14.7 (91) | def. by | Central District 23.2 (140) | Hickinbotham Oval (crowd: 1,258) | Report |
| Sunday, 19 August (2:10 pm) | Sturt 10.12 (72) | def. by | Glenelg 11.11 (77) | Unley Oval (crowd: 2,002) | Report |
| | Bye; North Adelaide |

=== Round 22 ===
| | Round 22 |
| Friday, 24 August (7:40 pm) | West Adelaide 8.13(61) | def. | South Adelaide 9.6 (60) | Richmond Oval (crowd: 1,793) | [Report] |
| Saturday, 25 August (2:10 pm) | Norwood 9.2 (56) | def. | Woodville-West Torrens 5.5 (35) | Norwood Oval (crowd: 2,886) | Report |
| Saturday, 25 August (2:10 pm) | Central District 15.13 (103) | def. | Sturt 9.4 (58) | Elizabeth Oval (crowd: 1,918) | Report |
| Sunday, 26 August (2:10 pm) | North Adelaide 13.12 (90) | def. | Port Adelaide 9.8 (62) | Prospect Oval (crowd: 2,924) | [Report] |
| | Bye; Glenelg |

=== Round 23 ===
| | Round 23 |
| Friday, 31 August | Glenelg 5.6 (36) | def. by | Norwood 6.8 (44) | Glenelg Oval (crowd: 3,311) | Report |
| Saturday, 1 September | Port Adelaide 17.13 (115) | def. | West Adelaide 10.10 (70) | Alberton Oval (crowd: 2,358) | Report |
| Sunday, 2 September | South Adelaide 17.10 (112) | def. | North Adelaide 15.3 (93) | Hickinbotham Oval (crowd: 1,689) | [Report] |
| Sunday, 2 September | Sturt 14.9 (93) | def. by | Woodville-West Torrens 21.10 (136) | Unley Oval (crowd: 2,203) | Report |
| | Bye; Central District |

=== Round 24 ===
| | Round 24 |
| Saturday, 8 September | Port Adelaide 13.5 (83) | def. by | Sturt 17.12 (114) | Alberton Oval (crowd: 2,882) | Report |
| Saturday, 8 September | Central District 11.10 (76) | def. by | North Adelaide 14.9 (93) | Elizabeth Oval (crowd: 3,064) | Report |
| Sunday, 9 September | Glenelg 15.8 (98) | def. by | South Adelaide 18.7 (115) | Glenelg Oval (crowd: 2,682) | Report |
| Sunday, 9 September | Woodville-West Torrens 7.10 (52) | def. | West Adelaide 5.6 (36) | Woodville Oval (crowd: 2,432) | Report |
| | Bye; Norwood |

== Ladder ==
2012 ladder
| Pos | Team | Pld | W | L | D | PF | PA | PP | Pts |
|---|---|---|---|---|---|---|---|---|---|
| 1 | Norwood (P) | 20 | 18 | 2 | 0 | 1746 | 1046 | 62.54 | 36 |
| 2 | Central District | 20 | 13 | 7 | 0 | 1821 | 1477 | 55.22 | 26 |
| 3 | West Adelaide | 20 | 12 | 8 | 0 | 1437 | 1295 | 52.60 | 24 |
| 4 | North Adelaide | 20 | 10 | 10 | 0 | 1650 | 1793 | 47.92 | 20 |
| 5 | Woodville-West Torrens | 20 | 9 | 11 | 0 | 1469 | 1649 | 47.11 | 18 |
| 6 | Glenelg | 20 | 8 | 12 | 0 | 1538 | 1779 | 46.37 | 16 |
| 7 | Port Adelaide | 20 | 7 | 13 | 0 | 1707 | 1735 | 49.59 | 14 |
| 8 | South Adelaide | 20 | 7 | 13 | 0 | 1715 | 1898 | 47.47 | 14 |
| 9 | Sturt | 20 | 6 | 14 | 0 | 1523 | 1934 | 44.06 | 12 |

Source: australianfootball.com
Rules for classification: 1) points; 2) percentage; 3) number of points for.
(P) Premiers

== Finals series ==
=== Finals week 1 – Elimination & Qualifying Finals ===
| | Finals week 1 |
| Elimination Final; Sunday, 16 September (12:10 pm) | North Adelaide 15.5 (95) | def. | Woodville-West Torrens 12.15 (87) | Football Park (crowd: see below) | Report |
| Qualifying Final; Sunday, 16 September (3:10 pm) | Central District 8.10 (58) | def. by | West Adelaide 13.7 (85) | Football Park (crowd: 7,126) | Report |
| | Bye; Norwood |
Both games held as a "double header" fixture on the same day at the same ground, hence only one crowd figure.

=== Finals week 2 – 1st & 2nd Semi-finals ===
| | Finals week 2 |
| 1st Semi-final; Sunday, 23 September (12:10 pm) | Central District 7.8 (50) | def. by | North Adelaide 21.12 (138) | Football Park (crowd: see below) | Report |
| 2nd Semi-final; Sunday, 23 September (3:10 pm) | Norwood 8.13 (61) | def. | West Adelaide 2.5 (17) | Football Park (crowd: 10,284) | Report |
Both games held as a "double header" fixture on the same day at the same ground, hence only one crowd figure.

=== Finals week 3 – Preliminary final ===
| | Finals week 3 |
| Preliminary Final; Sunday, 30 September (3:10 pm) | West Adelaide 13.10 (88) | def. | North Adelaide 10.7 (67) | Football Park (crowd: 5,238) | Report |
| | Bye; Norwood |

=== Finals week 4 – Grand Final ===
Grand Final
Sunday, 7 October (3:20 pm) | Norwood | def. | West Adelaide | Football Park (crowd: 29,661) | Report
1.1 (7); 4.4 (28); 9.5 (59); 12.7 (79) | Q1; Q2; Q3; Final | 0.3 (3); 1.4 (10); 1.6 (12); 3.12 (30) | Jack Oatey Medal: Dean Terlich; Television broadcast: ABC South Australia

== Club performances ==
| Club | Home ground | Minor Round ladder position | Final ladder position | Best home attendance | Membership |
|---|---|---|---|---|---|
| Central District | Elizabeth Oval | 2nd | 4th | 4,026 (Rd 2) | 2,230 |
| Glenelg | Glenelg Oval | 6th | 6th | 6,047 (Rd 2) | 3,218 |
| North Adelaide | Prospect Oval | 4th | 3rd | 4,134 (Rd 11) | 2,107 |
| Norwood | Norwood Oval | 1st | 1st | 6,353 (Rd 15) | 2,888 |
| Port Adelaide | Alberton Oval | 7th | 7th | 4,796 (Rd 4) | 4,351 |
| South Adelaide | Hickinbotham Oval | 8th | 8th | 4,219 (Rd 3) | 1,450 |
| Sturt | Unley Oval | 9th | 9th | 3,510 (Rd 9) | 2,948 |
| West Adelaide | Richmond Oval | 3rd | 2nd | 2,890 (Rd 3) | 1,851 |
| Woodville-West Torrens | Woodville Oval; Thebarton Oval | 5th | 5th | 4,054 (Rd 6) | 3,643 |

=== SANFL win/loss table ===
| Team | 1 | 2 | 3 | 4 | 5 | 6 | 7 | 8 | 9 | 10 | 11 | 12 | 13 | 14 | 15 | 16 | 17 | 18 | 19 | 20 | 21 | 22 | 23 | 24 | F1 | F2 | F3 | GF | Ladder |
|---|---|---|---|---|---|---|---|---|---|---|---|---|---|---|---|---|---|---|---|---|---|---|---|---|---|---|---|---|---|
| Central District | X | **Norw**; **20** | West; 16 | **South**; **44** | Port; 29 | WWT; 6 | X | **Gln**; **75** | North; 6 | Sturt; 11 | **West**; **37** | **Port**; **15** | Gln; 43 | **WWT**; **79** | Norw; 23 | **Sturt**; **79** | Port; 59 | Gln; 34 | X | **West**; **31** | South; 49 | **Sturt**; **45** | X | **North**; **17** | **West**; **27** | **North**; **88** | X | X | 2 |
| Team | 1 | 2 | 3 | 4 | 5 | 6 | 7 | 8 | 9 | 10 | 11 | 12 | 13 | 14 | 15 | 16 | 17 | 18 | 19 | 20 | 21 | 22 | 23 | 24 | F1 | F2 | F3 | GF | Ladder |

| + | Win | Qualified for finals |
| − | Loss | Eliminated |

Bold – Home game
X – Did not play
Opponent for round listed above margin

== Current clubs ==
Adelaide SANFL football grounds

| Club | Nickname | Entered competition | Premierships (as of 2012) | Most recent premiership | Home ground | Capacity |
|---|---|---|---|---|---|---|
| Central District | Bulldogs | 1964 | 9 | 2010 | Elizabeth Oval | 18,000 |
| Glenelg | Tigers | 1921 | 4 | 1986 | Glenelg Oval | 15,000 |
| North Adelaide | Roosters | 1888 | 13 | 1991 | Prospect Oval | 20,000 |
| Norwood | Redlegs | 1878 | 28 | 2012 | Norwood Oval | 22,000 |
| Port Adelaide | Magpies | 1877 | 36 | 1999 | Alberton Oval | 17,000 |
| South Adelaide | Panthers | 1877 | 11 | 1964 | Hickinbotham Oval | 12,000 |
| Sturt | Double Blues | 1901 | 13 | 2002 | Unley Oval | 15,000 |
| West Adelaide | Bloods | 1897 | 8 | 1983 | Richmond Oval | 16,500 |
| Woodville-West Torrens | Eagles | 1991 | 3 | 2011 | Woodville Oval | 15,000 |
