= 1992 SANFL season =

- Teams: 9
- Premiers: Port Adelaide; 31st premiership
- Minor premiers: Port Adelaide; 42nd minor premiership
- Magarey Medallist: Nathan Buckley; Port Adelaide (27 votes)
- Ken Farmer Medallist: Mark Tylor; Port Adelaide (97 Goals)

Attendance
- Matches played: 105
- Total attendance: 515,299 (4,908 per match)
- Highest: 42,242 (Grand Final, Port Adelaide vs. Glenelg)

The 1992 SANFL season was the 113th season of the highest level Australian rules football Competition in South Australia.

== Ladder ==
1992 SANFL Ladder
Pos	Team	Pld	W	L	D	PF	PA	PP	Pts
1	Port Adelaide (P)	22	18	4	0	2673	1946	57.87	36
2	Woodville-West Torrens	22	15	7	0	2173	2051	51.44	30
3	North Adelaide	22	13	9	0	2372	2006	54.18	26
4	Glenelg	22	13	9	0	2431	2143	53.15	26
5	South Adelaide	22	11	11	0	2371	2411	49.58	22
6	West Adelaide	22	10	12	0	2266	2290	49.74	20
7	Norwood	22	9	13	0	2187	2045	51.68	18
8	Central District	22	8	14	0	2038	2467	45.24	16
9	Sturt	22	2	20	0	1667	2819	37.16	4

Rules for classification: 1) points; 2) percentage; 3) number of points for.
(P) Premiers

== Finals ==
=== Grand Final ===
1992 SANFL Grand Final
Saturday, 3 October	Port Adelaide	def.	Glenelg	Football Park (crowd: 42,242)
1.2 (8); 8.3 (51); 15.3 (93); 17.3 (105)	Q1; Q2; Q3; Final	3.3 (21); 4.6 (30); 6.7 (43); 7.7 (49)
