= 1994 SANFL season =

115th season of the South Australian National Football League

- Teams: 9
- Premiers: Port Adelaide; 32nd premiership
- Minor premiers: Woodville-West Torrens; 2nd minor premiership
- Magarey Medallist: Garry McIntosh; Norwood (22 votes)
- Ken Farmer Medallist: Scott Hodges; Port Adelaide (114 Goals)

Attendance
- Matches played: 105
- Total attendance: 487,624 (4,644 per match)
- Highest: 40,598 (Grand Final, Port Adelaide vs. Woodville-West Torrens)

The 1994 SANFL season was the 115th season of the South Australian National Football League, the highest-level Australian rules football competition in South Australia.

Port Adelaide won the premiership for the 32nd time, defeating Woodville-West Torrens by 37 points in the 1994 SANFL Grand Final.

== Ladder ==
Pos	Team	Pld	W	L	D	PF	PA	PP	Pts
1	Woodville-West Torrens	22	18	4	0	2605	1875	58.15	36
2	Port Adelaide (P)	22	15	7	0	2605	1992	56.67	30
3	Central District	22	13	9	0	2297	1950	54.09	26
4	Norwood	22	11	11	0	2069	1917	51.91	22
5	Glenelg	22	10	12	0	2067	2381	46.47	20
6	North Adelaide	22	9	13	0	2222	2438	47.68	18
7	South Adelaide	22	9	13	0	2079	2352	46.92	18
8	West Adelaide	22	9	13	0	1957	2265	46.35	18
9	Sturt	22	5	17	0	1930	2661	42.04	10

Source: Click here for source
Rules for classification: 1) points; 2) percentage; 3) number of points for.
(P) Premiers

== Finals ==
=== Grand Final ===
1994 SANFL Grand Final
Sunday, 2 October	Woodville-West Torrens	def. by	Port Adelaide	Football Park (crowd: 40,598)
6.2 (38); 8.5 (53); 9.7 (61); 10.9 (69)	Q1; Q2; Q3; Final	2.4 (16); 4.7 (31); 6.13 (49); 15.16 (106)
