= 2010 SANFL season =

Australian football season

- Teams: 9
- Premiers: Central District; 9th premiership
- Minor premiers: Central District; 10th minor premiership
- Magarey Medallist: James Allan; North Adelaide (22 votes)
- Ken Farmer Medallist: Todd Grima; Glenelg (56 goals)

Attendance
- Matches played: 96
- Total attendance: 343,891 (3,582 per match)
- Highest: 34,355 (Grand Final, Central District vs. Norwood)

The 2010 South Australian National Football League season was the 131st season of the top-level Australian rules football competition in South Australia.

== Premiership season ==
=== Round 1 ===
	Round 1
Friday 26 March (7:40 pm)	West Adelaide 14.19 (103)	def.	North Adelaide 4.7 (31)	Richmond Oval
Saturday 27 March (2:10 pm)	Central District 13.12 (90)	def.	Port Adelaide 11.13 (79)	Elizabeth Oval
Saturday 27 March (2:10 pm)	South Adelaide 10.8 (68)	drew with	Sturt 10.8 (68)	Hickinbotham Oval
Saturday 27 March (4:10 pm)	Glenelg 17.11 (113)	def.	Norwood 5.7 (37)	Glenelg Oval
Bye: Woodville-West Torrens

=== Round 2 ===
	Round 2
Thursday 1 April (7:40 pm)	Norwood 11.12 (78)	def. by	South Adelaide 12.11 (83)	Norwood Oval
Saturday 3 April (2:10 pm)	North Adelaide 13.9 (87)	def.	Sturt 11.13 (79)	Prospect Oval
Saturday 3 April (2:10 pm)	West Adelaide 12.8 (80)	def. by	Glenelg 16.10 (106)	Richmond Oval
Saturday 3 April (2:10 pm)	Woodville-West Torrens 17.13 (115)	def.	Port Adelaide 14.8 (92)	Woodville Oval
Bye: Central District

=== Round 3 ===
	Round 3
Saturday 10 April (2:10 pm)	Central District 13.13 (91)	def.	West Adelaide 10.4 (64)	Elizabeth Oval
Saturday 10 April (2:10 pm)	Sturt 16.16 (112)	def.	Glenelg 11.7 (73)	Unley Oval
Saturday 10 April (2:10 pm)	Woodville-West Torrens 8.9 (57)	def.	Norwood 5.9 (39)	Woodville Oval
Sunday 11 April (2:10 pm)	Port Adelaide 7.5 (47)	def. by	North Adelaide 6.14 (50)	Alberton Oval
Bye: South Adelaide

=== Round 4 ===
	Round 4
Friday 16 April (7:40 pm)	West Adelaide 12.10 (82)	def.	Norwood 10.3 (63)	Richmond Oval
Saturday 17 April (2:10 pm)	Sturt 16.10 (106)	def. by	Woodville-West Torrens 24.6 (150)	Unley Oval
Sunday 18 April (2:10 pm)	Glenelg 13.10 (88)	def. by	Central District 14.14 (98)	Glenelg Oval
Sunday 18 April (2:10 pm)	South Adelaide 16.13 (109)	def. by	North Adelaide 25.13 (163)	Hickinbotham Oval
Bye: Port Adelaide

=== Round 5 ===
	Round 5
Saturday 24 April (2:10 pm)	North Adelaide 11.12 (78)	def. by	Glenelg 12.9 (81)	Prospect Oval
Sunday 25 April (3:10 pm)	Central District 8.8 (56)	def. by	Sturt 19.9 (123)	Elizabeth Oval
Sunday 25 April (7:40 pm)	Norwood 17.7 (109)	def.	Port Adelaide 11.8 (74)	Norwood Oval
Monday 26 April (2:10 pm)	South Adelaide 18.10 (118)	def.	Woodville-West Torrens 15.6 (96)	Hickinbotham Oval
Bye: West Adelaide

=== Round 6 ===
	Round 6
Friday 30 April (2:10 pm)	Norwood 16.12 (108)	def.	Sturt 4.5 (29)	Norwood Oval
Saturday 1 May (2:10 pm)	Port Adelaide 13.15 (93)	def.	South Adelaide 11.5 (71)	Alberton Oval
Sunday 2 May (2:10 pm)	North Adelaide 5.8 (38)	def. by	Central District 17.11 (113)	Prospect Oval
Sunday 2 May (2:10 pm)	Woodville-West Torrens 14.12 (96)	def.	West Adelaide 12.6 (78)	Woodville Oval
Bye: Glenelg

=== Round 7 ===
	Round 7
Friday 7 May (2:10 pm)	Norwood 16.13 (109)	def.	Glenelg 6.6 (42)	Norwood Oval
Saturday 8 May (2:10 pm)	Port Adelaide 12.12 (84)	def. by	Central District 22.10 (142)	Alberton Oval
Saturday 8 May (2:10 pm)	South Adelaide 9.6 (60)	def. by	West Adelaide 12.15 (87)	Hickinbotham Oval
Saturday 8 May (2:10 pm)	Woodville-West Torrens 18.6 (114)	def.	North Adelaide 5.17 (47)	Woodville Oval
Bye: Sturt

=== Round 8 ===
	Round 8
Friday 14 May (2:10 pm)	West Adelaide 13.10 (88)	def.	Port Adelaide 11.9 (75)	Richmond Oval
Saturday 15 May (2:10 pm)	Glenelg 18.14 (122)	def.	Woodville-West Torrens 12.11 (83)	Glenelg Oval
Saturday 15 May (2:10 pm)	North Adelaide 8.10 (58)	def. by	Norwood 12.11 (83)	Prospect Oval
Saturday 15 May (2:10 pm)	Sturt 15.8 (98)	def.	South Adelaide 12.9 (81)	Unley Oval
Bye: Central District

=== Round 9 ===
	Round 9
Saturday 22 May (2:10 pm)	Central District 19.6 (120)	def.	Woodville-West Torrens 14.8 (92)	Elizabeth Oval
Saturday 22 May (2:10 pm)	South Adelaide 11.8 (74)	def. by	Glenelg 18.13 (121)	Hickinbotham Oval
Saturday 22 May (2:10 pm)	North Adelaide 13.14 (92)	def.	West Adelaide 9.9 (63)	Prospect Oval
Saturday 22 May (2:10 pm)	Sturt 10.15 (75)	def. by	Port Adelaide 14.10 (94)	Unley Oval
Bye: Norwood

=== Round 10 ===
	Round 10
Saturday 29 May (2:10 pm)	Central District 15.12 (102)	def.	South Adelaide 8.5 (53)	Elizabeth Oval
Sunday 30 May (2:10 pm)	Glenelg 13.8 (86)	def.	Port Adelaide 11.11 (77)	Glenelg Oval
Sunday 30 May (2:10 pm)	West Adelaide 10.3 (63)	def.	Sturt 8.9 (57)	Mannum Oval
Sunday 30 May (2:10 pm)	Woodville-West Torrens 11.6 (72)	def. by	Norwood 14.4 (88)	Woodville Oval
Bye: North Adelaide

=== Round 11 ===
	Round 11
Saturday 5 June (2:10 pm)	North Adelaide 15.10 (100)	def.	South Adelaide 13.9 (87)	Prospect Oval
Sunday 6 June (2:10 pm)	Port Adelaide 13.8 (86)	def. by	Woodville-West Torrens 15.10 (100)	Alberton Oval
Sunday 6 June (2:10 pm)	Norwood 9.15 (69)	def.	Central District 9.12 (66)	Norwood Oval
Byes: Glenelg, Sturt, West Adelaide

=== Round 12 ===
	Round 12
Saturday 12 June (2:10 pm)	West Adelaide 6.7 (43)	def. by	Central District 10.6 (66)	Richmond Oval
Sunday 13 June (2:10 pm)	Sturt 11.13 (79)	def.	Norwood 10.11 (71)	Unley Oval
Sunday 13 June (2:10 pm)	South Adelaide 11.7 (73)	def. by	Port Adelaide 13.10 (88)	Hickinbotham Oval
Monday 14 June (2:10 pm)	Glenelg 17.8 (110)	def.	North Adelaide 8.15 (63)	Glenelg Oval
Bye: Woodville-West Torrens

=== Round 13 ===
	Round 13
Saturday 19 June (2:10 pm)	Port Adelaide 6.9 (45)	def. by	Norwood 8.9 (57)	Alberton Oval
Saturday 19 June (2:10 pm)	Central District 10.17 (77)	def.	North Adelaide 5.3 (33)	Elizabeth Oval
Saturday 19 June (2:10 pm)	West Adelaide 10.5 (65)	def.	Woodville-West Torrens 8.7 (55)	Richmond Oval
Sunday 20 June (2:10 pm)	Glenelg 14.11 (95)	def.	Sturt 13.11 (89)	Glenelg Oval
Bye: South Adelaide

=== Round 14 ===
	Round 14
Saturday 26 June (2:10 pm)	Central District 17.7 (109)	def.	Glenelg 11.6 (72)	Elizabeth Oval
Saturday 26 June (2:10 pm)	Norwood 8.6 (54)	def.	West Adelaide 6.6 (42)	Norwood Oval
Saturday 26 June (2:10 pm)	North Adelaide 8.13 (61)	def. by	Woodville-West Torrens 14.4 (88)	Prospect Oval
Saturday 26 June (2:10 pm)	Sturt 24.11 (155)	def.	South Adelaide 5.8 (38)	Unley Oval
Bye: Port Adelaide

=== Round 15 ===
	Round 15
Saturday 3 July (2:10 pm)	Woodville-West Torrens 13.8 (86)	def.	Sturt 7.18 (60)	Woodville Oval
Sunday 4 July (2:10 pm)	Port Adelaide 9.14 (68)	def. by	West Adelaide 11.8 (74)	Alberton Oval
Sunday 4 July (2:10 pm)	South Adelaide 12.6 (78)	def. by	Glenelg 12.12 (84)	Hickinbotham Oval
Bye: Norwood

=== Round 16 ===
	Round 16
Saturday 10 July (2:10 pm)	North Adelaide 13.10 (88)	def.	Port Adelaide 9.7 (61)	Prospect Oval
Saturday 10 July (2:10 pm)	West Adelaide 15.9 (99)	def.	South Adelaide 10.5 (65)	Richmond Oval
Saturday 10 July (2:10 pm)	Sturt 12.13 (85)	def.	Central District 9.7 (61)	Unley Oval
Sunday 11 July (2:10 pm)	Norwood 12.7 (79)	def.	Woodville-West Torrens 9.8 (62)	Norwood Oval
Byes: Central District, North Adelaide, Norwood

=== Round 17 ===
	Round 17
Saturday 17 July (2:10 pm)	Port Adelaide 10.10 (70)	def. by	Glenelg 15.15 (105)	Alberton Oval
Saturday 17 July (2:10 pm)	Central District 9.10 (64)	def.	Norwood 8.8 (56)	Elizabeth Oval
Saturday 17 July (2:10 pm)	Sturt 12.14 (86)	def.	North Adelaide 8.6 (54)	Unley Oval
Saturday 17 July (2:10 pm)	Woodville-West Torrens 17.14 (116)	def.	South Adelaide 9.9 (63)	Woodville Oval
Bye: West Adelaide

=== Round 18 ===
	Round 18
Saturday 24 July (2:10 pm)	Glenelg 16.12 (108)	def.	North Adelaide 9.9 (63)	Glenelg Oval
Saturday 24 July (2:10 pm)	West Adelaide 9.5 (59)	def. by	Central District 19.9 (123)	Richmond Oval
Saturday 31 July (2:10 pm)	South Adelaide 7.10 (52)	def. by	Norwood 17.13 (115)	Hickinbotham Oval
Sunday 1 August (2:10 pm)	Port Adelaide 13.7 (85)	def.	Sturt 4.9 (33)	Alberton Oval
Bye: Woodville-West Torrens

=== Round 19 ===
	Round 19
Saturday 7 August (2:10 pm)	Port Adelaide 12.7 (79)	def. by	Woodville-West Torrens 15.12 (102)	Alberton Oval
Saturday 7 August (2:10 pm)	Glenelg 20.4 (124)	def.	West Adelaide 7.11 (53)	Glenelg Oval
Saturday 7 August (2:10 pm)	South Adelaide 13.5 (83)	def. by	Central District 17.14 (116)	Hickinbotham Oval
Saturday 7 August (2:10 pm)	Norwood 16.14 (110)	def.	North Adelaide 6.10 (46)	Norwood Oval
Bye: Sturt

=== Round 20 ===
	Round 20
Saturday 14 August (2:10 pm)	Central District 16.10 (106)	def.	Port Adelaide 7.5 (47)	Elizabeth Oval
Saturday 14 August (2:10 pm)	North Adelaide 17.11 (113)	def.	South Adelaide 11.7 (73)	Prospect Oval
Saturday 14 August (2:10 pm)	West Adelaide 3.9 (27)	def. by	Sturt 8.2 (50)	Richmond Oval
Saturday 14 August (2:10 pm)	Woodville-West Torrens 5.13 (43)	def. by	Glenelg 12.4 (76)	Woodville Oval
Bye: Norwood

=== Round 21 ===
	Round 21
Friday 20 August (2:10 pm)	Norwood 5.10 (40)	def. by	Sturt 8.3 (51)	Norwood Oval
Friday 20 August (2:10 pm)	West Adelaide 3.4 (22)	def.	Port Adelaide 2.4 (16)	Richmond Oval
Saturday 21 August (2:10 pm)	Glenelg 22.14 (146)	def.	South Adelaide 10.10 (70)	Glenelg Oval
Saturday 21 August (2:10 pm)	Woodville-West Torrens 11.9 (75)	def.	Central District 7.9 (51)	Woodville Oval
Bye: North Adelaide

=== Round 22 ===
	Round 22
Saturday 28 August (2:10 pm)	South Adelaide 5.13 (43)	def. by	West Adelaide 12.10 (82)	Hickinbotham Oval
Sunday 29 August (2:10 pm)	Glenelg 15.11 (101)	def.	Norwood 11.5 (71)	Glenelg Oval
Sunday 29 August (2:10 pm)	North Adelaide 15.6 (96)	def.	Woodville-West Torrens 11.11 (77)	Prospect Oval
Sunday 29 August (2:10 pm)	Sturt 12.14 (86)	def.	Central District 10.11 (71)	Unley Oval
Bye: Port Adelaide

=== Round 23 ===
	Round 23
Saturday 4 September (2:10 pm)	Port Adelaide 4.9 (33)	def. by	North Adelaide 6.11 (47)	Alberton Oval
Saturday 4 September (2:10 pm)	Central District 7.8 (50)	def.	Glenelg 3.7 (25)	Elizabeth Oval
Sunday 5 September (2:10 pm)	Norwood 8.15 (63)	def.	West Adelaide 2.9 (21)	Norwood Oval
Sunday 5 September (2:10 pm)	Woodville-West Torrens 4.3 (27)	def. by	Sturt 9.11 (65)	Woodville Oval
Bye: South Adelaide

== Ladder ==
2010 SANFL Ladder
Pos	Team	Pld	W	L	D	PF	PA	PP	Pts
1	Central District (P)	20	15	5	0	1772	1354	56.69	30
2	Glenelg	20	15	5	0	1878	1507	55.48	30
3	Norwood	20	12	8	0	1499	1239	54.75	24
4	Sturt	20	11	8	1	1586	1435	52.50	23
5	Woodville-West Torrens	20	11	9	0	1706	1591	51.74	22
6	West Adelaide	20	10	10	0	1295	1398	48.09	20
7	North Adelaide	20	9	11	0	1408	1702	45.27	18
8	Port Adelaide	20	4	16	0	1393	1633	46.03	8
9	South Adelaide	20	2	17	1	1442	2120	40.48	5

Rules for classification: 1) points; 2) percentage; 3) number of points for.
(P) Premiers

== Finals series ==
=== Qualifying and Elimination Finals ===
	Elimination Final
Sunday 12 September (12:15 pm)	Woodville-West Torrens 17.14 (116)	def.	Sturt 6.10 (46)	Football Park (crowd: 11,449)

	Qualifying Final
Sunday 12 September (3:15 pm)	Norwood 12.11 (83)	def.	Glenelg 5.9 (39)	Football Park (crowd: 11,449)

=== Semi-finals ===
	First Semi-final
Sunday 19 September (12:15 pm)	Woodville-West Torrens 13.15 (93)	def.	Glenelg 7.13 (55)	Football Park (crowd: 13,162)

	Second Semi-final
Sunday 19 September (3:15 pm)	Central District 12.9 (81)	def.	Norwood 9.9 (63)	Football Park (crowd: 13,162)

=== Preliminary final ===
	Preliminary Final
Sunday 26 September (2:10 pm)	Norwood 8.8 (56)	def.	Woodville-West Torrens 7.9 (51)	Football Park (crowd: 8,342)

== Grand final ==
2010 SANFL Grand Final
Sunday 3 October (2:10 pm)	Central District	def.	Norwood	Football Park (crowd: 34,355)
4.1 (25); 4.5 (29); 9.11 (65); 10.11 (71)	Q1; Q2; Q3; Final	1.1 (7); 7.4 (46); 7.6 (48); 9.11 (65)	Television broadcast: ABC
