= Brayden Lyle =

Australian rules footballer

Personal information
- Full name: Brayden Lyle
- Born: 6 March 1973 (age 53)
- Original team: Port Adelaide (SANFL)
- Draft: 124th overall, 1992 AFL draft
- Height: 178 cm (5 ft 10 in)
- Weight: 81 kg (179 lb)
- Position: Midfielder

Playing career^{1}
Years	Club	Games (Goals)
1995–1996	West Coast	26 (5)
1997–2001	Port Adelaide	90 (12)
Total		116 (17)

Representative team honours^{2}
Years	Team	Games (Goals)
1997	South Australia	1 (0)
- ^{1} Playing statistics correct to the end of 2001.^{2} Representative statistics correct as of 1997.

Brayden Lyle (born 6 March 1973) is a former Australian rules footballer who played for the West Coast Eagles and the Port Adelaide Football Club in the Australian Football League (AFL).

== AFL career ==
=== West Coast career (1995–1996) ===
Lyle played for the West Coast Eagles in the 1995 and 1996 seasons, taking part in the club's finals campaign in the former year, but then struggled to break into the West Coast midfield, one of the AFL's strongest at the time. Lyle appeared for Western Australian Football League (WAFL) club East Perth when not playing for the West Coast.

=== Port Adelaide career (1997–2001) ===
Lyle returned to Port Adelaide in 1997 for their inaugural AFL season. He was named vice-captain alongside teammate Matthew Primus and captained Port in their first game (due to Gavin Wanganeen being suspended). Lyle averaged a career high 22 disposals in 1997, a remarkable turnaround after only playing 25 games in three years at West Coast. He was mostly used in the midfield as a centreman. Lyle won Port's Best Team Man award in his first two seasons (1997 and 1998). In 1997, he also represented South Australia in a State of Origin game against Victoria at Football Park and won the Fos Williams Medal.

With Port's developing midfield depth in 2001, younger players overtook Lyle, and he was delisted at the end of the year. Despite playing only eight games for the season, he featured in Port's losing semifinal against Hawthorn at Football Park, his final match.
