= 2009 SANFL season =

- Teams: 9
- Premiers: Central District; 8th premiership
- Minor premiers: Glenelg; 5th minor premiership
- Magarey Medallist: James Ezard; West Adelaide (18 votes); Rhys Archard; North Adelaide (18 votes)
- Ken Farmer Medallist: Brant Chambers; Sturt (80 Goals)

Attendance
- Matches played: 106
- Total attendance: 331,355 (3,126 per match)
- Highest: 35,647 (Grand Final, Central District vs. Sturt)

The 2009 South Australian National Football League season was the 130th season of the top-level Australian rules football competition in South Australia.

== Premiership season ==
=== Round 1 ===
	Round 1
Friday 27 March (2:10 pm)	Norwood 15.12 (102)	def.	Port Adelaide 10.9 (69)	Norwood Oval
Saturday 28 March (2:10 pm)	Central District 10.14 (74)	def.	Woodville-West Torrens 10.6 (66)	Elizabeth Oval
Saturday 28 March (2:10 pm)	Glenelg 13.15 (93)	def.	Sturt 9.6 (60)	Glenelg Oval
Saturday 28 March (2:10 pm)	South Adelaide 10.8 (68)	def.	West Adelaide 7.16 (58)	Hickinbotham Oval
Bye: North Adelaide

=== Round 2 ===
	Round 2
Saturday 4 April (2:10 pm)	Port Adelaide 15.8 (98)	def. by	Glenelg 17.13 (115)	Alberton Oval
Saturday 4 April (2:10 pm)	North Adelaide 15.11 (101)	def. by	Central District 19.15 (129)	Prospect Oval
Saturday 4 April (2:10 pm)	West Adelaide 11.11 (77)	drew with	Woodville-West Torrens 10.17 (77)	Richmond Oval
Saturday 4 April (2:10 pm)	Sturt 14.16 (100)	def.	Norwood 12.8 (80)	Unley Oval
Bye: South Adelaide

=== Round 3 ===
	Round 3
Saturday 11 April (2:10 pm)	South Adelaide 7.7 (49)	def. by	Norwood 21.10 (136)	Encounter Bay
Saturday 11 April (2:10 pm)	North Adelaide 16.14 (110)	def.	Port Adelaide 11.10 (76)	Prospect Oval
Saturday 11 April (2:10 pm)	Sturt 17.16 (118)	def.	West Adelaide 8.9 (57)	Unley Oval
Saturday 11 April (2:10 pm)	Woodville-West Torrens 15.16 (106)	def.	Glenelg 10.16 (76)	Woodville Oval
Bye: Central District

=== Round 4 ===
	Round 4
Friday 17 April (2:10 pm)	Norwood 11.7 (73)	def. by	North Adelaide 16.12 (108)	Norwood Oval
Saturday 18 April (2:10 pm)	Central District 22.17 (149)	def.	South Adelaide 11.12 (78)	Elizabeth Oval
Sunday 19 April (2:10 pm)	Port Adelaide 10.11 (71)	def. by	Woodville-West Torrens 15.13 (103)	Alberton Oval
Sunday 19 April (2:10 pm)	Glenelg 12.15 (87)	def.	West Adelaide 12.11 (83)	Glenelg Oval
Bye: Sturt

=== Round 5 ===
	Round 5
Saturday 25 April (2:10 pm)	Glenelg 7.8 (50)	def. by	Central District 21.8 (134)	Adelaide Oval
Saturday 25 April (2:10 pm)	Sturt 7.6 (48)	def. by	North Adelaide 7.9 (51)	Unley Oval
Saturday 25 April (2:10 pm)	Woodville-West Torrens 11.4 (70)	def.	South Adelaide 5.11 (41)	Woodville Oval
Sunday 26 April (2:10 pm)	West Adelaide 12.12 (84)	def.	Norwood 11.15 (81)	Richmond Oval
Bye: Port Adelaide

=== Round 6 ===
	Round 6
Saturday 2 May (2:10 pm)	Norwood 17.6 (108)	def. by	Central District 16.13 (109)	Norwood Oval
Sunday 3 May (2:10 pm)	Port Adelaide 10.8 (68)	def. by	Sturt 17.8 (110)	Alberton Oval
Sunday 3 May (2:10 pm)	South Adelaide 11.9 (75)	def. by	Glenelg 14.17 (101)	Hickinbotham Oval
Sunday 3 May (2:10 pm)	North Adelaide 14.9 (93)	def. by	Woodville-West Torrens 15.11 (101)	Prospect Oval
Bye: West Adelaide

=== Round 7 ===
	Round 7
Saturday 9 May (2:10 pm)	Central District 16.17 (113)	def.	West Adelaide 8.3 (51)	Elizabeth Oval
Saturday 9 May (2:10 pm)	Glenelg 11.13 (79)	def.	North Adelaide 11.8 (74)	Glenelg Oval
Saturday 9 May (2:10 pm)	South Adelaide 10.8 (68)	def. by	Port Adelaide 19.13 (127)	Hickinbotham Oval
Saturday 9 May (2:10 pm)	Woodville-West Torrens 11.5 (71)	def. by	Sturt 21.12 (138)	Woodville Oval
Bye: Norwood

=== Round 8 ===
	Round 8
Friday 15 May (2:10 pm)	Norwood 8.8 (56)	def. by	Glenelg 17.15 (117)	Norwood Oval
Saturday 16 May (2:10 pm)	Central District 18.9 (117)	def.	Port Adelaide 16.7 (103)	Elizabeth Oval
Saturday 16 May (2:10 pm)	West Adelaide 12.15 (87)	def.	Woodville-West Torrens 10.7 (67)	Richmond Oval
Saturday 16 May (2:10 pm)	Sturt 16.17 (113)	def.	South Adelaide 5.6 (36)	Unley Oval
Bye: North Adelaide

=== Round 9 ===
	Round 9
Friday 29 May (2:10 pm)	Norwood 6.11 (47)	def. by	Sturt 14.9 (93)	Norwood Oval
Saturday 30 May (2:10 pm)	Port Adelaide 9.16 (70)	def. by	West Adelaide 11.8 (74)	Alberton Oval
Saturday 30 May (2:10 pm)	South Adelaide 10.11 (71)	def. by	North Adelaide 15.17 (107)	Hickinbotham Oval
Saturday 30 May (2:10 pm)	Woodville-West Torrens 14.6 (90)	def.	Central District 11.9 (75)	Woodville Oval
Bye: Glenelg

=== Round 10 ===
	Round 10
Saturday 6 June (2:10 pm)	West Adelaide 9.8 (62)	def. by	North Adelaide 11.12 (78)	Richmond Oval
Saturday 6 June (2:10 pm)	Woodville-West Torrens 5.4 (34)	def. by	Norwood 15.19 (109)	Woodville Oval
Monday 8 June (2:10 pm)	Glenelg 16.11 (107)	def.	Port Adelaide 8.9 (57)	Glenelg Oval
Monday 8 June (2:10 pm)	Sturt 19.11 (125)	def.	Central District 6.4 (40)	Unley Oval
Bye: South Adelaide

=== Round 11 ===
	Round 11
Saturday 13 June (2:10 pm)	Glenelg 16.12 (108)	def.	West Adelaide 9.8 (62)	Glenelg Oval
Saturday 13 June (2:10 pm)	South Adelaide 13.6 (84)	def. by	Norwood 11.19 (85)	Hickinbotham Oval
Saturday 13 June (2:10 pm)	North Adelaide 18.11 (119)	def.	Sturt 4.6 (30)	Prospect Oval
Byes: Central District, Port Adelaide, Woodville-West Torrens

=== Round 12 ===
	Round 12
Friday 19 June (2:10 pm)	Glenelg 14.12 (96)	def.	Sturt 8.6 (54)	Adelaide Oval
Saturday 20 June (2:10 pm)	Port Adelaide 16.14 (110)	def.	Norwood 12.11 (83)	Alberton Oval
Saturday 20 June (2:10 pm)	Central District 12.8 (80)	def.	North Adelaide 6.13 (49)	Elizabeth Oval
Sunday 21 June (2:10 pm)	South Adelaide 10.8 (68)	def. by	Woodville-West Torrens 13.11 (89)	Hickinbotham Oval
Bye: West Adelaide

=== Round 13 ===
	Round 13
Saturday 27 June (2:10 pm)	Norwood 11.9 (75)	def. by	West Adelaide 14.10 (94)	Norwood Oval
Sunday 28 June (2:10 pm)	Port Adelaide 15.4 (94)	def.	North Adelaide 10.12 (72)	Alberton Oval
Sunday 28 June (2:10 pm)	South Adelaide 9.10 (64)	def. by	Central District 11.14 (80)	Hickinbotham Oval
Sunday 28 June (2:10 pm)	Woodville-West Torrens 11.5 (71)	def. by	Glenelg 16.9 (105)	Woodville Oval
Bye: Sturt

=== Round 14 ===
	Round 14
Saturday 4 July (2:10 pm)	Central District 17.10 (112)	def.	Norwood 15.5 (95)	Elizabeth Oval
Saturday 4 July (2:10 pm)	Sturt 22.9 (141)	def.	West Adelaide 7.3 (45)	Waikerie Oval
Sunday 5 July (2:10 pm)	Glenelg 13.10 (88)	def.	South Adelaide 9.8 (62)	Glenelg Oval
Sunday 5 July (2:10 pm)	Woodville-West Torrens 19.9 (123)	def.	Port Adelaide 15.15 (105)	Woodville Oval
Bye: North Adelaide

=== Round 15 ===
	Round 15
Saturday 11 July (2:10 pm)	West Adelaide 11.8 (74)	def.	Central District 9.12 (66)	Richmond Oval
Saturday 11 July (2:10 pm)	Sturt 22.14 (146)	def.	Woodville-West Torrens 13.12 (90)	Unley Oval
Sunday 12 July (2:10 pm)	Port Adelaide 20.6 (126)	def.	South Adelaide 10.7 (67)	Alberton Oval
Sunday 12 July (2:10 pm)	North Adelaide 13.11 (89)	def.	Norwood 5.10 (40)	Prospect Oval
Bye: Glenelg

=== Round 16 ===
	Round 16
Saturday 18 July (2:10 pm)	Central District 12.15 (87)	def.	Woodville-West Torrens 11.10 (76)	Elizabeth Oval
Saturday 18 July (2:10 pm)	Glenelg 8.21 (69)	def.	Port Adelaide 9.9 (63)	Glenelg Oval
Saturday 18 July (2:10 pm)	South Adelaide 14.8 (92)	def. by	Sturt 14.16 (100)	Hickinbotham Oval
Saturday 18 July (2:10 pm)	North Adelaide 12.9 (81)	def.	West Adelaide 7.9 (51)	Prospect Oval
Bye: Norwood

=== Round 17 ===
	Round 17
Saturday 25 July (2:10 pm)	Glenelg 11.15 (81)	drew with	Central District 12.9 (81)	Glenelg Oval
Saturday 25 July (2:10 pm)	Norwood 14.10 (94)	def.	South Adelaide 7.9 (51)	Norwood Oval
Saturday 25 July (2:10 pm)	Sturt 19.15 (129)	def.	Port Adelaide 5.7 (37)	Unley Oval
Saturday 25 July (2:10 pm)	Woodville-West Torrens 13.6 (84)	def.	North Adelaide 9.13 (67)	Woodville Oval
Bye: West Adelaide

=== Round 18 ===
	Round 18
Saturday 1 August (2:10 pm)	Port Adelaide 11.5 (71)	def. by	Central District 16.15 (111)	Alberton Oval
Saturday 1 August (2:10 pm)	Glenelg 14.8 (92)	def.	Norwood 12.10 (82)	Glenelg Oval
Saturday 1 August (2:10 pm)	North Adelaide 8.8 (56)	def. by	Sturt 13.16 (94)	Prospect Oval
Saturday 1 August (2:10 pm)	West Adelaide 22.7 (139)	def.	South Adelaide 7.9 (51)	Richmond Oval
Bye: Woodville-West Torrens

=== Round 19 ===
	Round 19
Saturday 8 August (2:10 pm)	Norwood 13.5 (83)	def. by	Woodville-West Torrens 16.8 (104)	Norwood Oval
Saturday 8 August (2:10 pm)	West Adelaide 16.10 (106)	def.	Port Adelaide 9.9 (63)	Richmond Oval
Sunday 9 August (2:10 pm)	North Adelaide 12.4 (76)	def. by	Glenelg 16.12 (108)	Prospect Oval
Byes: Central District, South Adelaide, Sturt

=== Round 20 ===
	Round 20
Saturday 15 August (2:10 pm)	Port Adelaide 13.8 (86)	def. by	Norwood 18.14 (122)	Alberton Oval
Saturday 15 August (2:10 pm)	North Adelaide 8.10 (58)	def. by	Central District 17.9 (111)	Prospect Oval
Saturday 15 August (2:10 pm)	Woodville-West Torrens 20.10 (130)	def.	South Adelaide 10.14 (74)	Thebarton Oval
Saturday 15 August (2:10 pm)	Sturt 24.19 (163)	def.	West Adelaide 7.12 (54)	Unley Oval
Bye: Glenelg

=== Round 21 ===
	Round 21
Friday 21 August (2:10 pm)	Norwood 8.10 (58)	def. by	North Adelaide 18.12 (120)	Norwood Oval
Saturday 22 August (2:10 pm)	Central District 23.11 (149)	def.	South Adelaide 11.4 (70)	Elizabeth Oval
Sunday 23 August (2:10 pm)	Sturt 7.4 (46)	def. by	Glenelg 9.16 (70)	Unley Oval
Sunday 23 August (2:10 pm)	Woodville-West Torrens 15.17 (107)	def.	West Adelaide 10.11 (71)	Woodville Oval
Bye: Port Adelaide

=== Round 22 ===
	Round 22
Saturday 29 August (2:10 pm)	Central District 11.10 (76)	def.	Sturt 8.10 (58)	Elizabeth Oval
Saturday 29 August (2:10 pm)	West Adelaide 5.6 (36)	def. by	North Adelaide 5.11 (41)	Richmond Oval
Sunday 30 August (2:10 pm)	Glenelg 16.10 (106)	def.	Woodville-West Torrens 12.8 (80)	Glenelg Oval
Sunday 30 August (2:10 pm)	South Adelaide 14.8 (92)	def.	Port Adelaide 12.11 (83)	Hickinbotham Oval
Bye: Norwood

=== Round 23 ===
	Round 23
Saturday 5 September (2:10 pm)	Port Adelaide 10.13 (73)	def. by	Sturt 20.11 (131)	Alberton Oval
Saturday 5 September (2:10 pm)	Norwood 12.15 (87)	def.	Central District 11.15 (81)	Norwood Oval
Saturday 5 September (2:10 pm)	North Adelaide 24.10 (154)	def.	South Adelaide 15.4 (94)	Prospect Oval
Sunday 6 September (2:10 pm)	West Adelaide 7.9 (51)	def. by	Glenelg 16.14 (110)	Richmond Oval
Bye: Woodville-West Torrens

== Ladder ==
2009 SANFL Ladder
Pos	Team	Pld	W	L	D	PF	PA	PP	Pts
1	Glenelg	20	17	2	1	1858	1471	55.81	35
2	Central District (P)	20	15	4	1	1974	1555	55.94	31
3	Sturt	20	14	6	0	1997	1351	59.65	28
4	Woodville-West Torrens	20	11	8	1	1739	1753	49.80	23
5	North Adelaide	20	11	9	0	1704	1519	52.87	22
6	West Adelaide	20	7	12	1	1416	1765	44.51	15
7	Norwood	20	7	13	0	1696	1786	48.71	14
8	Port Adelaide	20	4	16	0	1650	2011	45.07	8
9	South Adelaide	20	2	18	0	1355	2178	38.35	4

Rules for classification: 1) points; 2) percentage; 3) number of points for.
(P) Premiers

== Finals series ==
=== Week one – Qualifying and elimination finals ===
	Elimination final
Sunday, 13 September (12:15 pm)	Woodville-West Torrens 15.12 (102)	def.	North Adelaide 14.7 (91)	Football Park (crowd: 10,192)

	Qualifying final
Sunday, 13 September (3:15 pm)	Central District 11.9 (75)	def.	Sturt 10.9 (69)	Football Park (crowd: 10,192)

=== Week two – Semi-finals ===
	First Semi-final
Sunday, 20 September (12:15 pm)	Sturt 12.16 (88)	def.	Woodville-West Torrens 11.12 (78)	Football Park (crowd: 14,207)

	Second Semi-final
Sunday, 20 September (3:15 pm)	Glenelg 11.13 (79)	def. by	Central District 12.9 (81)	Football Park (crowd: 14,207)

=== Week three – Preliminary final ===
	Preliminary final
Sunday, 27 September (3:15 pm)	Glenelg 7.13 (55)	def. by	Sturt 9.6 (60)	Football Park (crowd: 8,184)

== Grand final ==
2009 SANFL Grand Final
Sunday 4 October (2:10 pm)	Central District	def.	Sturt	Football Park (crowd: 35,647)
6.3 (39); 9.8 (62); 12.12 (84); 13.14 (92)	Q1; Q2; Q3; Final	3.3 (21); 3.6 (24); 6.7 (43); 7.12 (54)	Television broadcast: ABC
