= 2005 SANFL season =

- Teams: 9
- Premiers: Central District; 5th premiership
- Minor premiers: Central District; 8th minor premiership
- Magarey Medallist: Jeremy Clayton; Port Adelaide (24 votes)
- Ken Farmer Medallist: Daniel Schell; Central District (67 Goals)

Attendance
- Matches played: 96
- Total attendance: 303,026 (3,157 per match)
- Highest: 28,637 (Grand Final, Central District vs. Woodville-West Torrens)

The 2005 South Australian National Football League season was the 126th season of the top-level Australian rules football competition in South Australia.

== Ladder ==
2005 SANFL Ladder
Pos	Team	Pld	W	L	D	PF	PA	PP	Pts
1	Central District (P)	20	15	5	0	2083	1483	58.41	30
2	Woodville-West Torrens	20	15	5	0	2117	1587	57.15	30
3	Port Adelaide	20	12	8	0	2060	1835	52.89	24
4	North Adelaide	20	12	8	0	1904	1732	52.37	24
5	Sturt	20	11	9	0	1732	1748	49.77	22
6	Norwood	20	9	11	0	1624	1804	47.37	18
7	South Adelaide	20	7	13	0	1706	1912	47.15	14
8	Glenelg	20	6	14	0	1822	2077	46.73	12
9	West Adelaide	20	3	17	0	1379	2249	38.01	6

Rules for classification: 1) points; 2) percentage; 3) number of points for.
(P) Premiers

== Grand final ==
2005 SANFL Grand Final
Sunday 2 October (2:10 pm)	Central District	def.	Woodville-West Torrens	Football Park (crowd: 28,637)
3.3 (21); 7.6 (48); 10.9 (69); 15.14 (104)	Q1; Q2; Q3; Final	2.1 (13); 7.3 (45); 8.8 (56); 11.10 (76)
