= 1987 SANFL season =

- Teams: 10
- Premiers: North Adelaide; 12th premiership
- Minor premiers: North Adelaide; 14th minor premiership
- Magarey Medallist: Andrew Jarman; North Adelaide (23 votes)
- Ken Farmer Medallist: John Roberts; North Adelaide (111 Goals)

Attendance
- Matches played: 116
- Total attendance: 758,525 (6,539 per match)
- Highest: 50,617 (Grand Final, North Adelaide vs. Glenelg)

The 1987 South Australian National Football League season was the 108th season of the top-level Australian rules football competition in South Australia.

== Ladder ==
1987 SANFL Ladder
Pos	Team	Pld	W	L	D	PF	PA	PP	Pts
1	North Adelaide (P)	22	19	3	0	2515	1846	57.67	38
2	Port Adelaide	22	15	7	0	2280	2042	52.75	30
3	Norwood	22	14	8	0	2423	1996	54.83	28
4	Glenelg	22	12	10	0	2502	2119	54.14	24
5	Woodville	22	12	10	0	2240	2409	48.18	24
6	West Torrens	22	10	12	0	2160	2069	51.08	20
7	West Adelaide	22	10	12	0	2374	2466	49.05	20
8	Central District	22	7	15	0	2121	2555	45.36	14
9	Sturt	22	6	16	0	2137	2500	46.09	12
10	South Adelaide	22	5	17	0	1798	2548	41.37	10

Rules for classification: 1) points; 2) percentage; 3) number of points for.
(P) Premiers

== 1987 SANFL Finals ==
=== Week 4 (1987 SANFL Grand Final) ===
1987 SANFL Grand Final
Saturday, 3 October (2:10pm)	North Adelaide	def.	Glenelg	Football Park (crowd: 50,617)
5.2 (32); 11.4 (70); 18.5 (113); 23.7 (145)	Q1; Q2; Q3; Final	0.1 (1); 1.5 (11); 4.7 (31); 9.9 (63)
