= 1999 SANFL season =

- Teams: 9
- Premiers: Port Adelaide; 36th premiership
- Minor premiers: Port Adelaide; 43rd minor premiership
- Magarey Medallist: Damian Squire; Sturt (21 votes)
- Ken Farmer Medallist: Adam Richardson; West Adelaide (66 Goals)
- Matches played: 96
- Highest: 39,135 (Grand Final, Port Adelaide vs. Norwood)

The 1999 South Australian National Football League season was the 120th season of the top-level Australian rules football competition in South Australia.

== Ladder ==
1999 SANFL Ladder
Pos	Team	Pld	W	L	D	PF	PA	PP	Pts
1	Port Adelaide (P)	20	15	5	0	1701	1397	54.91	30
2	Woodville-West Torrens	20	14	6	0	1724	1455	54.23	28
3	Glenelg	20	13	7	0	1585	1360	53.82	26
4	Sturt	20	12	8	0	1715	1482	53.64	24
5	Norwood	20	12	8	0	1699	1582	51.78	24
6	West Adelaide	20	10	10	0	1743	1575	52.53	20
7	Central District	20	10	10	0	1668	1658	50.15	20
8	South Adelaide	20	2	18	0	1475	1991	42.56	4
9	North Adelaide	20	2	18	0	1307	2117	38.17	4

Rules for classification: 1) points; 2) percentage; 3) number of points for.
(P) Premiers

== Grand final ==
1999 SANFL Grand Final
Sunday 3 October (2:10 pm)	Port Adelaide	def.	Norwood	Football Park (crowd: 39,135)
2.1 (13); 8.5 (53); 12.11 (81); 14.17 (101)	Q1; Q2; Q3; Final	4.2 (26); 9.6 (60); 10.8 (68); 14.9 (93)
