= 2001 SANFL season =

- Teams: 9
- Premiers: Central District; 2nd premiership
- Minor premiers: Central District; 4th minor premiership
- Magarey Medallist: Tony Brown; Port Adelaide (19 votes); Ryan O'Connor; Port Adelaide (19 votes)
- Ken Farmer Medallist: Adam Richardson; West Adelaide (81 Goals)

Attendance
- Matches played: 96
- Total attendance: 344,909 (3,593 per match)
- Highest: 26,378 (Grand Final, Central District vs. Woodville-West Torrens)

The 2001 South Australian National Football League season was the 122nd season of the top-level Australian rules football competition in South Australia.

== Ladder ==
2001 SANFL Ladder
Pos	Team	Pld	W	L	D	PF	PA	PP	Pts
1	Central District (P)	20	16	4	0	2047	1530	57.23	32
2	Port Adelaide	20	14	5	1	1940	1543	55.70	29
3	Woodville-West Torrens	20	14	6	0	1801	1410	56.09	28
4	West Adelaide	20	11	9	0	2008	1868	51.81	22
5	Norwood	20	11	9	0	1697	1597	51.52	22
6	Sturt	20	9	11	0	1872	1719	52.13	18
7	South Adelaide	20	7	13	0	1884	2139	46.83	14
8	North Adelaide	20	4	16	0	1603	2324	40.82	8
9	Glenelg	20	3	16	1	1294	2016	39.09	7

Rules for classification: 1) points; 2) percentage; 3) number of points for.
(P) Premiers

== Grand final ==
2001 SANFL Grand Final
Sunday 7 October (2:10 pm)	Central District	def.	Woodville-West Torrens	Football Park (crowd: 26,378)
2.2 (14); 5.2 (32); 8.3 (51); 10.11 (71)	Q1; Q2; Q3; Final	1.0 (6); 4.3 (27); 4.3 (27); 4.8 (32)
