= Jeremy Clayton =

Australian rules footballer, born 1981

Personal information
- Full name: Jeremy Clayton
- Born: 9 February 1981 (age 45)
- Original team: Warracknabeal
- Height: 175 cm (5 ft 9 in)
- Weight: 76 kg (168 lb)

Playing career^{1}
Years	Club	Games (Goals)
2003–2004	Kangaroos	8 (6)
- ^{1} Playing statistics correct to the end of 2004.

Career highlights
- Magarey Medal (2005); 5x A.R. McLean Medal (2005-2008, 2012); Port Adelaide life membership (2021)

Jeremy Clayton (born 9 February 1981) is a professional Australian rules footballer who played for the North Melbourne Football Club in the Australian Football League before enjoying great success in the South Australian National Football League (SANFL) with the Port Adelaide Magpies, winning the Magarey Medal for the best and fairest in the SANFL in 2005.

Clayton was originally from Warracknabeal, Victoria and originally signed to play with SANFL club Woodville-West Torrens when he was rookie-listed by North Melbourne in 2002.

Clayton played eight games for North Melbourne between 2003 and 2004, while also representing North's Victorian Football League (VFL) feeder club Port Melbourne. At Port Melbourne, he polled the most votes for the 2003 J. J. Liston Trophy, but was ineligible for the award due to a suspension during the year.

After his delisting by North Melbourne, Clayton moved to Port Adelaide Magpies in the SANFL. He won the Magarey Medal in his first SANFL season in 2005, receiving the medal while in hospital after injuring his spleen during the finals series. AFL club Richmond approached Clayton at the end of 2005 with a view to drafting him at the 2005 AFL draft but Clayton preferred to remain at Port Adelaide. He went on to win four consecutive Best and Fairest Awards for Port Adelaide from 2005 to 2008. Clayton suffered a season ending knee reconstruction and retired from football at the end of the 2012 SANFL season, with 125 games for Port Adelaide to his name.
