= 1991 SANFL season =

- Teams: 9
- Premiers: North Adelaide; 13th premiership
- Minor premiers: South Adelaide; 4th minor premiership
- Magarey Medallist: Mark Naley; South Adelaide (29 votes)
- Ken Farmer Medallist: Scott Morphett; Woodville-West Torrens (99 Goals)

Attendance
- Matches played: 105
- Total attendance: 560,114 (5,334 per match)
- Highest: 39,276 (Grand Final, North Adelaide vs. West Adelaide)

The 1991 SANFL season was the 112th season of the highest level Australian rules football Competition in South Australia. Woodville and West Torrens merged as the Eagles at the end of the 1990 season resulting in the competition reducing from 10 to 9 clubs.

== Minor Rounds ==
=== Round 1 ===
	Round 1
Saturday, 23 March (2:10 pm)	Glenelg 22.22 (154)	def.	Norwood 13.5 (83)	Football Park
Saturday, 23 March (2:10 pm)	Port Adelaide 15.21 (110)	def.	West Adelaide 13.8 (86)	Alberton Oval
Saturday, 23 March (2:10 pm)	North Adelaide 19.14 (128)	def.	South Adelaide 18.12 (120)	Prospect Oval
Monday, 25 March (2:10 pm)	Sturt 10.14 (74)	def. by	Woodville-West Torrens 21.22 (148)	Football Park
	Bye; Central District

== Ladder ==
1991 SANFL Ladder
Pos	Team	Pld	W	L	D	PF	PA	PP	Pts
1	South Adelaide	22	16	6	0	2471	1908	56.43	32
2	Woodville-West Torrens	22	16	6	0	2320	1978	53.98	32
3	North Adelaide (P)	22	14	7	1	2476	1903	56.54	29
4	Port Adelaide	22	14	8	0	2109	1938	52.11	28
5	West Adelaide	22	12	10	0	2193	2126	50.78	24
6	Glenelg	22	10	12	0	2246	2407	48.27	20
7	Norwood	22	7	14	1	1999	2134	48.37	15
8	Central District	22	6	16	0	1950	2305	45.83	12
9	Sturt	22	3	19	0	1699	2764	38.07	6

Rules for classification: 1) points; 2) percentage; 3) number of points for.
(P) Premiers

== Grand final ==
1991 SANFL Grand Final
Sunday, 5 October (2:10 pm)	North Adelaide	def.	West Adelaide	Football Park (crowd: 39,276)
5.4 (34); 11.9 (75); 15.12 (102); 21.22 (148)	Q1; Q2; Q3; Final	4.2 (26); 7.3 (45); 10.4 (64); 11.7 (73)
