= 1998 SANFL season =

- Teams: 9
- Premiers: Port Adelaide; 35th premiership
- Minor premiers: Sturt; 9th minor premiership
- Magarey Medallist: Andrew Osborn; South Adelaide (16 votes)
- Ken Farmer Medallist: Adam Richardson; West Adelaide (100 Goals)
- Matches played: 96
- Highest: 44,838 (Grand Final, Port Adelaide vs. Sturt)

The 1998 South Australian National Football League season was the 119th season of the top-level Australian rules football competition in South Australia.

== Ladder ==
1998 SANFL Ladder
Pos	Team	Pld	W	L	D	PF	PA	PP	Pts
1	Sturt	20	16	4	0	1760	1385	55.96	32
2	West Adelaide	20	13	7	0	1701	1534	52.58	26
3	Norwood	20	13	7	0	1511	1409	51.75	26
4	Port Adelaide (P)	20	12	8	0	1649	1417	53.78	24
5	Central District	20	9	11	0	1619	1523	51.53	18
6	Woodville-West Torrens	20	9	11	0	1608	1590	50.28	18
7	South Adelaide	20	9	11	0	1525	1619	48.51	18
8	North Adelaide	20	5	15	0	1383	1845	42.84	10
9	Glenelg	20	4	16	0	1317	1751	42.93	8

Rules for classification: 1) points; 2) percentage; 3) number of points for.
(P) Premiers

== Grand final ==
1998 SANFL Grand Final
Sunday, 4 October (2:10 pm)	Sturt	def. by	Port Adelaide	Football Park (crowd: 44,838)
2.4 (16); 4.8 (32); 5.12 (42); 9.12 (66)	Q1; Q2; Q3; Final	2.2 (14); 4.4 (28); 7.7 (49); 11.9 (75)
