= 1986 SANFL season =

- Teams: 10
- Premiers: Glenelg; 4th premiership
- Minor premiers: North Adelaide; 13th minor premiership
- Magarey Medallist: Greg Anderson; Port Adelaide (23 votes)
- Ken Farmer Medallist: Stephen Nichols; Woodville (103 Goals)

Attendance
- Matches played: 116
- Total attendance: 770,298 (6,641 per match)
- Highest: 50,538 (Grand Final, Glenelg vs. North Adelaide)

The 1986 South Australian National Football League season was the 107th season of the top-level Australian rules football competition in South Australia.

== Ladder ==
1986 SANFL Ladder
Pos	Team	Pld	W	L	D	PF	PA	PP	Pts
1	North Adelaide	22	16	6	0	2563	1960	56.67	32
2	Glenelg (P)	22	13	9	0	2436	2004	54.86	26
3	Port Adelaide	22	13	9	0	2232	2164	50.77	26
4	Woodville	22	13	9	0	2377	2430	49.45	26
5	Norwood	22	12	10	0	2341	2124	52.43	24
6	Central District	22	11	10	1	2200	2386	47.97	23
7	West Adelaide	22	9	13	0	2367	2251	51.26	18
8	Sturt	22	9	13	0	2032	2357	46.30	18
9	South Adelaide	22	7	14	1	2193	2335	48.43	15
10	West Torrens	22	6	16	0	1810	2540	41.61	12

Rules for classification: 1) points; 2) percentage; 3) number of points for.
(P) Premiers

== 1986 SANFL Finals ==
=== Week 4 (1986 SANFL Grand Final) ===
1986 SANFL Grand Final
Saturday, 4 October (2:10pm)	North Adelaide	def. by	Glenelg	Football Park (crowd: 50,538)
3.2 (20); 6.7 (43); 9.11 (65); 12.15 (87)	Q1; Q2; Q3; Final	7.2 (44); 12.4 (76); 17.5 (107); 21.9 (135)
