= 2004 SANFL season =

- Teams: 9
- Premiers: Central District; 4th premiership
- Minor premiers: Central District; 7th minor premiership
- Magarey Medallist: Paul Thomas; Central District (22 votes)
- Ken Farmer Medallist: Daniel Schell; Central District (63 Goals)

Attendance
- Matches played: 96
- Total attendance: 312,360 (3,254 per match)
- Highest: 24,207 (Grand Final, Central District vs. Woodville-West Torrens)

The 2004 South Australian National Football League season was the 125th season of the top-level Australian rules football competition in South Australia.

== Ladder ==
2004 SANFL Ladder
Pos	Team	Pld	W	L	D	PF	PA	PP	Pts
1	Central District (P)	20	17	3	0	2160	1274	62.90	34
2	Woodville-West Torrens	20	16	4	0	1846	1356	57.65	32
3	Sturt	20	12	8	0	1782	1497	54.35	24
4	North Adelaide	20	12	8	0	1816	1779	50.51	24
5	West Adelaide	20	8	12	0	1491	1875	44.30	16
6	Port Adelaide	20	7	13	0	1605	1707	48.46	14
7	Glenelg	20	7	13	0	1517	1800	45.73	14
8	South Adelaide	20	7	13	0	1455	1834	44.24	14
9	Norwood	20	4	16	0	1405	1955	41.82	8

Rules for classification: 1) points; 2) percentage; 3) number of points for.
(P) Premiers

== Grand final ==
2004 SANFL Grand Final
Sunday 3 October (2:10 pm)	Central District	def.	Woodville-West Torrens	Football Park (crowd: 24,207)
6.1 (37); 11.5 (71); 18.11 (117); 23.15 (153)	Q1; Q2; Q3; Final	2.2 (14); 3.3 (21); 4.3 (27); 4.4 (28)
