= 2003 SANFL season =

- Teams: 9
- Premiers: Central District; 3rd premiership
- Minor premiers: Central District; 6th minor premiership
- Magarey Medallist: Brett Ebert; Port Adelaide (25 votes)
- Ken Farmer Medallist: Darren Bradshaw; West Adelaide (88 Goals)

Attendance
- Matches played: 94
- Total attendance: 313,212 (3,332 per match)
- Highest: 28,199 (Grand Final, Central District vs. West Adelaide)

The 2003 South Australian National Football League season was the 124th season of the top-level Australian rules football competition in South Australia.

== Ladder ==
2003 SANFL Ladder
Pos	Team	Pld	W	L	D	PF	PA	PP	Pts
1	Central District (P)	20	16	4	0	2182	1287	62.90	32
2	West Adelaide	20	15	5	0	2072	1678	55.25	30
3	Sturt	20	13	7	0	2009	1563	56.24	26
4	Woodville-West Torrens	20	12	8	0	1779	1663	51.69	24
5	Port Adelaide	20	11	9	0	2027	1854	52.23	22
6	Norwood	20	9	10	1	1729	1895	47.71	19
7	South Adelaide	20	6	13	1	1853	2261	45.04	13
8	Glenelg	20	5	15	0	1621	1997	44.80	10
9	North Adelaide	20	1	17	2	1493	2567	36.77	4

Rules for classification: 1) points; 2) percentage; 3) number of points for.
(P) Premiers

== Finals ==
The SANFL reverted to a Final Four format for the first time since 1972.
First Semi-final - Woodville-West Torrens defeated Sturt by 25 points
Second Semi-final - Central District defeated West Adelaide by 18 points
Preliminary Final - West Adelaide defeated Woodville-West Torrens by 30 points

== Grand final ==
2003 SANFL Grand Final
Sunday 5 October (2:10 pm)	Central District	def.	West Adelaide	Football Park (crowd: 28,199)
5.1 (31); 10.4 (64); 14.7 (84); 17.9 (111)	Q1; Q2; Q3; Final	3.3 (21); 5.5 (35); 9.6 (60); 11.11 (77)
