= List of Port Adelaide Football Club leading goalkickers =

The following is a list of Port Adelaide Football Club leading goalkickers in each season of its history, including its time in the South Australian National Football League (SANFL) and the Australian Football League (AFL) in men's competition, and the AFL Women's in women's competition.

== Men's ==
^	Denotes current player
+	Player led the league goalkicking in same season

Port Adelaide leading goalkickers (men's)
Foundation era (unassociated)
Year	Leading goalkicker	Goals
1870	John Wald	2
1871	Unknown Player	1
1872	—N/a	—N/a
1873	Samuel Tyzack	1
1874	Unknown Player	1
1875	Henry Ford	2
1875	Charles Warren	2
1876	Ernest Le Messurier	1
1876	Thomas Prideaux	1
1876	John Rann	1
1876	Samuel Tyzack (2)	1
SAFA era
Year	Leading goalkicker	Goals
1877	Alfred Le Messurier	5
1878	Joseph Carter	3
1878	Ernest Le Messurier (2)	3
1879	Ernest Le Messurier (3)	4
1880	Ernest Le Messurier (4)	3
1881	James Watt	6
1882	George Slatter	6
1883	John Litchfield+	13
1884	Robert Roy+	25
1885	Robert Roy (2)	13
1886	Michael Coffee	6
1887	Alfred Bushby	22
1888	Henry Phillips	24
1889	Charlie Fry+	32
1890	John McKenzie+	54
1891	John McKenzie (2)	37
1892	Alexander McKenzie	43
1893	Alexander McKenzie (2)	59
1894	Alexander McKenzie (3)	36
1895	Alexander McKenzie (4)	25
1896	Adam Lees	19
1897	Adam Lees+ (2)	26
1898	William Stark	31
1899	William Stark (2)	13
1900	Henry Tompkins	16
1901	Jack Quinn	27
1902	Matthew Healy	25
1903	Jimmy Tompkins	40
1904	Jimmy Tompkins (2)	28
1905	John Mathison+	30
1906	John Mathison+ (2)	42
SAFL era
Year	Leading goalkicker	Goals
1907	Jack Quinn+ (2)	32
1908	John Mathison+ (3)	33
1909	Angelo Congear	12
1910	Frank Hansen	46
1911	Frank Hansen+ (2)	41
1912	Frank Hansen+ (3)	37
1913	Frank Hansen+ (4)	39
1914	Jack Dunn+	33
1915	Angelo Congear (2)	21
World War I
1919	Len Lackman+	26
1920	Eric Dewar	24
1921	Maurice Allingham	43
1922	Maurice Allingham (2)	47
1923	Maurice Allingham (3)	42
1924	Maurice Allingham (4)	28
1925	Harold Logan	56
1926	Harold Logan (2)	36
SANFL era
Year	Leading goalkicker	Goals
1927	Harold Logan (3)	66
1928	Les Dayman	41
1929	Les Dayman+ (2)	86
1930	Les Dayman (3)	89
1931	Les Dayman (4)	70
1932	Ned Hender	55
1933	Ned Hender (2)	48
1934	Jim Prideaux	73
1935	Jim Prideaux (2)	95
1936	Jim Prideaux (3)	86
1937	Robert Quinn	51
1938	Albert Hollingworth	45
1939	Howard Abbott	49
1940	Allan McLean	47
1941	Allan McLean (2)	62
World War II
1942	Merv Shaw	42
1943	Merv Shaw (2)	55
1944	Merv Shaw (3)	69
Normal competition resumed
1945	Robert Quinn (2)	51
1946	Ken Jolly	46
1947	Allan McLean+ (3)	80
1948	Allan McLean (4)	48
1949	Lloyd Zucker	51
1950	Fos Williams	40
1951	Noel Clark	37
1952	Roger Clift	26
1953	Ray Whitaker	35
1954	Tom Garland	44
1955	Fos Williams (2)	35
1956	Rex Johns+	70
1957	Rex Johns (2)	77
1958	Rex Johns+ (3)	55
1959	Wally Dittmar+	74
1960	Wally Dittmar+ (2)	69
1961	Rex Johns (4)	54
1962	Rex Johns (5)	76
1963	Rex Johns+ (6)	54
1964	Jeffrey Potter	30
1965	Eric Freeman	74
1966	Eric Freeman+ (2)	81
1967	Eric Freeman (3)	74
1968	Russell Ebert	44
1969	Michael Dittmar	28
1970	Eric Freeman (4)	75
1971	Eric Freeman (5)	50
1972	Max James	62
1973	John Cahill	59
1974	Darrell Cahill	54
1975	Tim Evans	64
1976	Randall Gerlach	90
1977	Tim Evans+ (2)	87
1978	Tim Evans+ (3)	90
1979	Tim Evans (4)	82
1980	Tim Evans+ (5)	146
1981	Tim Evans+ (6)	98
1982	Tim Evans+ (7)	125
1983	Tim Evans (8)	63
1984	Tim Evans (9)	127
1985	Tim Evans (10)	96
1986	Darren Smith	49
1987	Darren Smith (2)	71
1988	Scott Hodges	74
1989	Scott Hodges (2)	79
1990	Scott Hodges+ (3)	153
1991	Darryl Borlase	25
1992	Mark Tylor+	97
1993	Mark Tylor+ (2)	90
1994	Scott Hodges+ (4)	130
1995	Mark Tylor (3)	53
1996	Scott Hodges (5)	117
AFL era
Year	Leading goalkicker	Goals
1997	Scott Cummings	70
1998	Warren Tredrea	33
1999	Warren Tredrea (2)	40
2000	Warren Tredrea (3)	32
2001	Warren Tredrea (4)	51
2002	Stuart Dew	51
2003	Warren Tredrea (5)	58
2004	Warren Tredrea (6)	81
2005	Warren Tredrea (7)	65
2006	Josh Mahoney	29
2007	Brett Ebert	56
2008	Daniel Motlop	57
2009	Warren Tredrea (8)	51
2010	Jay Schulz	33
2011	Robbie Gray	32
2012	Jay Schulz (2)	42
2013	Jay Schulz (3)	49
2014	Jay Schulz (4)	66
2015	Chad Wingard	53
2016	Chad Wingard (2)	38
2017	Charlie Dixon	49
2018	Robbie Gray (2)	36
2019	Connor Rozee^	29
2020	Charlie Dixon (2)	34
2021	Charlie Dixon (3)	48
2022	Todd Marshall^	45
2023	Jeremy Finlayson	38
2024	Mitch Georgiades^	44
2025	Mitch Georgiades^ (2)	58
2026	Mitch Georgiades^ (3)	51

=== Multiple leading goalkickers ===
Multiple leading goalkickers
10	Tim Evans
8	Warren Tredrea
6	Rex Johns
5	Eric Freeman
5	Scott Hodges

=== Leading career goalkickers for Port Adelaide ===
	Player	Total goals	AFL goals	SANFL goals
1	Tim Evans	993		993
2	Scott Hodges	671		671
3	Warren Tredrea	582	549	33
4	Darren Smith	456		456
5	Rex Johns	451		451
6	Brian Cunningham	428		428
7	Bob McLean	414		414
8	Leslie Dayman	401		401
9	Mark Tylor	395		395
10	Eric Freeman	390		390
11	Bob Quinn	386		386
12	Darrell Cahill	375		375
13	Robbie Gray	367	367	0
14	Darryl Borlase	328		328
15	Justin Westhoff	316	313	3
16	Tim Ginever	302		302
17	Russell Ebert	295		295
18	Jeff Potter	289		289
19	Stephen Williams	288		288
20	John Cahill	286		286

== Women's ==
^	Denotes current player

Port Adelaide leading goalkickers (women's)
Season	Leading goalkicker	Goals
2022 (S7)	Jade de Melo^	4
2022 (S7)	Hannah Ewings	4
2022 (S7)	Gemma Houghton^	4
2022 (S7)	Brittany Perry	4
2023	Gemma Houghton^	16
2024	Gemma Houghton^	17
2025	Indy Tahau^	25
