= List of SANFL wooden spoons =

The wooden spoon is the imaginary and ironic "award" which is said to be won by the team finishing in last place in the South Australian National Football League. No physical wooden spoon award exists nor is such an award officially sanctioned by the SANFL.

== Competitions ==
South Australian Football Association (1877) was dissolved in May 1888 after the remaining three Clubs Norwood, Hotham (North Adelaide 1888) and Gawler applied and joined the South Australian United Football Association newly formed by Adelaide, Port Adelaide and South Adelaide who had all resigned from the South Australian Football Association.
South Australian United Football Association (1888) was renamed South Australian Football Association in 1889.
South Australian Football Association (1889) was renamed South Australian Football League in 1907.
South Australian Football League (1907) was renamed South Australian National Football League in 1927.

== Criteria ==
The team which finishes with the worst record across the completed season is awarded the wooden spoon. This is determined by:

- Fewest premiership points (two points for a win, one point for a draw)
- Lowest percentage

== Wooden spoons by season ==
| Season | Club | Total | Wins | Losses | Draws | Percentage | Points |
|---|---|---|---|---|---|---|---|
| 1877 | Bankers | 1 | 0 | 15 | 0 | N/A | 0 |
| 1878 | Kensington | 1 | 0 | 9 | 3 | N/A | 3 |
| 1879 | Kensington | 2 | 0 | 8 | 1 | N/A | 1 |
| 1880 | Adelaide (I) | 1 | 1 | 8 | 2 | N/A | 4 |
| 1881 | Adelaide (I) - Kensington | 1 | 0 | 5 | 0 | N/A | 0 |
| 1882 | Royal Park | 1 | 0 | 10 | 0 | N/A | 0 |
| 1883 | Victorian (SAFA)/(North Adelaide 1883-1884) | 1 | 2 | 11 | 2 | N/A | 6 |
| 1884 | Victorian (SAFA)/(North Adelaide 1883-1884) | 2 | 1 | 10 | 1 | N/A | 3 |
| 1885 | Adelaide (II)/(1885 - 1893 SAFA) | 1 | 4 | 11 | 0 | N/A | 8 |
| 1886 | Port Adelaide | 1 | 3 | 11 | 1 | N/A | 7 |
| 1887 | West Adelaide (1887) | 1 | 1 | 13 | 2 | N/A | 2 |
| 1888 | Medindie (North Adelaide) | 1 | 1 | 16 | 0 | N/A | 2 |
| 1889 | Medindie (North Adelaide) | 2 | 0 | 15 | 0 | N/A | 0 |
| 1890 | Gawler | 1 | 0 | 12 | 2 | N/A | 2 |
| 1891 | Adelaide (II) (1885-1893 SAFA) | 2 | 0 | 16 | 0 | N/A | 0 |
| 1892 | Adelaide (II) (1885-1893 SAFA) | 3 | 0 | 15 | 1 | N/A | 1 |
| 1893 | Adelaide (II) (1885-1893 SAFA) | 4 | 1 | 15 | 0 | N/A | 2 |
| 1894 | North Adelaide | 3 | 1 | 17 | 0 | N/A | 2 |
| 1895 | Natives (West Torrens) | 1 | 2 | 14 | 0 | N/A | 4 |
| 1896 | Port Adelaide | 2 | 4 | 13 | 1 | N/A | 9 |
| 1897 | West Adelaide | 1 | 1 | 15 | 1 | 20.77% | 3 |
| 1898 | West Adelaide | 2 | 0 | 14 | 0 | 20.11% | 0 |
| 1899 | North Adelaide | 4 | 1 | 10 | 1 | 35.59% | 3 |
| 1900 | Port Adelaide | 3 | 2 | 10 | 0 | 40.3% | 4 |
| 1901 | Sturt | 1 | 5 | 12 | 1 | 37.87% | 11 |
| 1902 | Sturt | 2 | 1 | 11 | 0 | 26.43% | 2 |
| 1903 | Sturt | 3 | 2 | 9 | 1 | 35.44% | 5 |
| 1904 | West Adelaide | 3 | 1 | 11 | 0 | 27.94% | 2 |
| 1905 | West Adelaide | 4 | 1 | 11 | 0 | 28.61% | 2 |
| 1906 | West Adelaide | 5 | 0 | 12 | 0 | 26.91% | 0 |
| 1907 | Sturt | 4 | 3 | 9 | 0 | 41.60% | 6 |
| 1908 | Sturt | 5 | 0 | 12 | 0 | 32.99% | 0 |
| 1909 | South Adelaide | 1 | 0 | 12 | 0 | 32.72% | 0 |
| 1910 | South Adelaide | 2 | 1 | 11 | 0 | 35.37% | 2 |
| 1911 | South Adelaide | 3 | 1 | 11 | 0 | 41.24% | 2 |
| 1912 | North Adelaide | 5 | 3 | 9 | 0 | 44.54% | 6 |
| 1913 | Norwood | 1 | 2 | 10 | 0 | 44.20% | 4 |
| 1914 | Norwood | 2 | 4 | 8 | 0 | 45.46% | 8 |
| 1915 | Norwood | 3 | 3 | 9 | 0 | 40.34% | 6 |
| 1919 | Norwood | 4 | 1 | 11 | 0 | 39.52% | 2 |
| 1920 | West Adelaide | 6 | 2 | 9 | 1 | 40.59% | 5 |
| 1921 | Glenelg | 1 | 0 | 14 | 0 | 30.00% | 0 |
| 1922 | Glenelg | 2 | 0 | 14 | 0 | 31.81% | 0 |
| 1923 | Glenelg | 3 | 0 | 14 | 0 | 32.35% | 0 |
| 1924 | Glenelg | 4 | 0 | 14 | 0 | 36.97% | 0 |
| 1925 | Glenelg | 5 | 2 | 12 | 0 | 38.81% | 4 |
| 1926 | South Adelaide | 4 | 0 | 13 | 1 | 40.26% | 1 |
| 1927 | South Adelaide | 5 | 2 | 15 | 0 | 39.11% | 4 |
| 1928 | South Adelaide | 6 | 2 | 14 | 1 | 44.67% | 5 |
| 1929 | South Adelaide | 7 | 3 | 14 | 0 | 41.72% | 6 |
| 1930 | West Torrens | 1 | 3 | 14 | 0 | 45.35% | 6 |
| 1931 | West Adelaide | 7 | 2 | 13 | 0 | 41.82% | 4 |
| 1932 | South Adelaide | 8 | 2 | 14 | 1 | 43.59% | 5 |
| 1933 | West Adelaide | 8 | 0 | 17 | 0 | 43.37% | 0 |
| 1934 | South Adelaide | 9 | 4 | 13 | 0 | 43.33% | 8 |
| 1935 | Glenelg | 6 | 1 | 16 | 0 | 39.26% | 2 |
| 1936 | West Adelaide | 9 | 2 | 15 | 0 | 34.99% | 4 |
| 1937 | Glenelg | 7 | 3 | 13 | 1 | 41.82% | 7 |
| 1938 | Glenelg | 8 | 3 | 14 | 0 | 41.87% | 6 |
| 1939 | Glenelg | 9 | 2 | 15 | 0 | 43.64% | 4 |
| 1940 | Glenelg | 10 | 3 | 14 | 0 | 41.07% | 6 |
| 1941 | West Torrens | 2 | 4 | 13 | 0 | 42.14% | 8 |
| 1945 | South Adelaide | 10 | 3 | 14 | 0 | 45.90% | 6 |
| 1946 | Glenelg | 11 | 1 | 16 | 0 | 40.92% | 2 |
| 1947 | South Adelaide | 11 | 2 | 15 | 0 | 39.93% | 4 |
| 1948 | South Adelaide | 12 | 0 | 17 | 0 | 35.20% | 0 |
| 1949 | Sturt | 6 | 3 | 14 | 0 | 40.78% | 6 |
| 1950 | South Adelaide | 13 | 0 | 17 | 0 | 31.46 | 0 |
| 1951 | South Adelaide | 14 | 1 | 17 | 0 | 36.63% | 2 |
| 1952 | Sturt | 7 | 3 | 14 | 0 | 40.79% | 6 |
| 1953 | South Adelaide | 15 | 5 | 13 | 0 | 38.75% | 10 |
| 1954 | Glenelg | 12 | 4 | 14 | 0 | 44.90% | 8 |
| 1955 | South Adelaide | 16 | 2 | 15 | 0 | 39.01% | 4 |
| 1956 | Sturt | 8 | 3 | 14 | 1 | 40.44% | 7 |
| 1957 | South Adelaide | 17 | 2 | 16 | 0 | 39.64% | 4 |
| 1958 | Sturt | 9 | 2 | 15 | 1 | 42.33% | 5 |
| 1959 | South Adelaide | 18 | 3 | 15 | 0 | 38.20% | 6 |
| 1960 | Glenelg | 13 | 2 | 16 | 0 | 40.31% | 4 |
| 1961 | Sturt | 10 | 3 | 16 | 0 | 42.70% | 6 |
| 1962 | South Adelaide | 19 | 3 | 16 | 0 | 35.41% | 6 |
| 1963 | South Adelaide | 20 | 2 | 18 | 0 | 41.28% | 4 |
| 1964 | Central District | 1 | 0 | 20 | 0 | 31.10% | 0 |
| 1965 | Woodville | 1 | 3 | 17 | 0 | 42.05% | 6 |
| 1966 | Glenelg | 14 | 3 | 17 | 0 | 39.30% | 6 |
| 1967 | Woodville | 2 | 1 | 18 | 1 | 39.60% | 3 |
| 1968 | Norwood | 5 | 3 | 16 | 1 | 44.56% | 7 |
| 1969 | South Adelaide | 21 | 2 | 18 | 0 | 38.23% | 4 |
| 1970 | South Adelaide | 22 | 3 | 17 | 0 | 40.35% | 6 |
| 1971 | Woodville | 3 | 6 | 15 | 0 | 37.12% | 12 |
| 1972 | West Adelaide | 10 | 4 | 16 | 1 | 44.35% | 9 |
| 1973 | West Adelaide | 11 | 3 | 17 | 1 | 42.35% | 7 |
| 1974 | West Adelaide | 12 | 4 | 18 | 0 | 40.53% | 8 |
| 1975 | West Torrens | 3 | 2 | 16 | 0 | 41.84% | 4 |
| 1976 | West Torrens | 4 | 2 | 19 | 0 | 40.12% | 4 |
| 1977 | Central District | 2 | 5 | 16 | 1 | 42.00% | 11 |
| 1978 | North Adelaide | 6 | 5 | 17 | 0 | 42.82% | 10 |
| 1979 | West Adelaide | 13 | 7 | 14 | 1 | 48.30% | 15 |
| 1980 | Woodville | 4 | 4 | 18 | 0 | 40.60% | 8 |
| 1981 | Woodville | 5 | 3 | 19 | 0 | 36.53% | 6 |
| 1982 | Woodville | 6 | 1 | 21 | 0 | 37.47% | 2 |
| 1983 | Woodville | 7 | 4 | 18 | 0 | 39.51% | 8 |
| 1984 | Woodville | 8 | 4 | 18 | 0 | 43.29% | 8 |
| 1985 | Woodville | 9 | 6 | 16 | 0 | 46.35% | 12 |
| 1986 | West Torrens | 5 | 6 | 16 | 0 | 41.61% | 12 |
| 1987 | South Adelaide | 23 | 5 | 17 | 0 | 41.37% | 10 |
| 1988 | South Adelaide | 24 | 1 | 21 | 0 | 32.31% | 2 |
| 1989 | Sturt | 11 | 4 | 18 | 0 | 42.92% | 8 |
| 1990 | Sturt | 12 | 2 | 18 | 0 | 37.20% | 4 |
| 1991 | Sturt | 13 | 3 | 19 | 0 | 38.07% | 6 |
| 1992 | Sturt | 14 | 2 | 20 | 0 | 37.16% | 4 |
| 1993 | Sturt | 15 | 4 | 16 | 0 | 41.25% | 8 |
| 1994 | Sturt | 16 | 5 | 17 | 0 | 42.04% | 10 |
| 1995 | Sturt | 17 | 0 | 22 | 0 | 32.22% | 0 |
| 1996 | Sturt | 18 | 4 | 16 | 0 | 38.78% | 8 |
| 1997 | South Adelaide | 25 | 4 | 14 | 2 | 40.85% | 10 |
| 1998 | Glenelg | 15 | 4 | 16 | 0 | 42.93% | 8 |
| 1999 | North Adelaide | 7 | 2 | 18 | 0 | 38.17% | 4 |
| 2000 | Glenelg | 16 | 3 | 17 | 0 | 39.81% | 6 |
| 2001 | Glenelg | 17 | 3 | 16 | 1 | 39.09% | 7 |
| 2002 | Glenelg | 18 | 3 | 17 | 0 | 38.53% | 6 |
| 2003 | North Adelaide | 8 | 1 | 17 | 2 | 36.77% | 4 |
| 2004 | Norwood | 6 | 4 | 16 | 0 | 41.82% | 8 |
| 2005 | West Adelaide | 14 | 3 | 17 | 0 | 38.01% | 6 |
| 2006 | West Adelaide | 15 | 2 | 18 | 0 | 39.25% | 4 |
| 2007 | West Adelaide | 16 | 3 | 17 | 0 | 38.47% | 6 |
| 2008 | West Adelaide | 17 | 2 | 18 | 0 | 39.17% | 4 |
| 2009 | South Adelaide | 26 | 2 | 18 | 0 | 38.35% | 4 |
| 2010 | South Adelaide | 27 | 2 | 17 | 1 | 40.48% | 5 |
| 2011 | Sturt | 19 | 5 | 15 | 0 | 44.45% | 10 |
| 2012 | Sturt | 20 | 6 | 14 | 0 | 44.06% | 12 |
| 2013 | Glenelg | 19 | 4 | 16 | 0 | 41.13% | 8 |
| 2014 | Glenelg | 20 | 4 | 14 | 0 | 38.22% | 8 |
| 2015 | North Adelaide | 9 | 1 | 17 | 0 | 33.91% | 2 |
| 2016 | West Adelaide | 18 | 2 | 16 | 0 | 34.78% | 4 |
| 2017 | North Adelaide | 10 | 4 | 14 | 0 | 43.97% | 8 |
| 2018 | Adelaide (III) (AFL Reserves) | 1 | 1 | 17 | 0 | 37.10% | 2 |
| 2019 | West Adelaide | 19 | 2 | 16 | 0 | 38.83% | 4 |
| 2020 | West Adelaide | 20 | 2 | 11 | 1 | 40.42% | 5 |
| 2021 | West Adelaide | 21 | 2 | 16 | 0 | 39.39% | 4 |
| 2022 | West Adelaide | 22 | 3 | 15 | 0 | 41.90% | 6 |
| 2023 | West Adelaide | 23 | 4 | 13 | 1 | 45.83% | 9 |
| 2024 | Port Adelaide (AFL Reserves) | 4 | 4 | 14 | 0 | 40.28% | 8 |
| 2025 | West Adelaide | 24 | 3 | 15 | 0 | 36.82% | 6 |
| 2026 | Port Adelaide (AFL Reserves) | 5 | 3 | 15 | 0 | 38.47% | 6 |

== Wooden spoons by SANFL clubs ==
| Club | Total Wooden Spoons | First Season | Years of Wooden Spoon |
|---|---|---|---|
| **South Adelaide** | 27 | 1877 | 1909, 1910, 1911, 1926, 1927, 1928, 1929, 1932, 1934, 1945, 1947, 1948, 1950, 1951, 1953, 1955, 1957, 1959, 1962, 1963, 1969, 1970, 1987, 1988, 1997, 2009, 2010 |
| **West Adelaide** | 24 | 1897 | 1897, 1898, 1904, 1905, 1906, 1920, 1931, 1933, 1936, 1972, 1973, 1974, 1979, 2005, 2006, 2007, 2008, 2016, 2019, 2020, 2021, 2022, 2023, 2025 |
| **Sturt** | 20 | 1901 | 1901, 1902, 1903, 1907, 1908, 1949, 1952, 1956, 1958, 1961, 1989, 1990, 1991, 1992, 1993, 1994, 1995, 1996, 2011, 2012 |
| **Glenelg** | 20 | 1921 | 1921, 1922, 1923, 1924, 1925, 1935, 1937, 1938, 1939, 1940, 1946, 1954, 1960, 1966, 1998, 2000, 2001, 2002, 2013, 2014 |
| **North Adelaide** | 10 | 1888 | 1888, 1889, 1894, 1899, 1912, 1978, 1999, 2003, 2015, 2017 |
| **Woodville** | 9 | 1964 | 1965, 1967, 1971, 1980, 1981, 1982, 1983, 1984, 1985 |
| **Norwood** | 6 | 1878 | 1913, 1914, 1915, 1919, 1968, 2004 |
| **West Torrens** | 5 | 1897 | 1930, 1941, 1975, 1976, 1986 |
| **Port Adelaide** | 5 | 1877 | 1886, 1896, 1900, 2024, 2026 |
| **Central District** | 2 | 1964 | 1964, 1977 |
| **Adelaide (III)** **(AFL Reserves)** | 1 | 2014 | 2018 |
| **Woodville-West Torrens** | 0 | 1991 | N/A |

Bold indicates clubs currently playing in the SANFL.
North Adelaide joined SAFA in 1888 as Medindie and renamed to its current name in 1893.
West Torrens and Woodville merged at the end of the 1990 season. The merged club has never collected a wooden spoon.
Adelaide AFL Crows reserves first competed in SANFL in 2014 season.

== Wooden spoons by former SAFA clubs (1877-1896 pre Electoral Districts) ==
| Club | Total Wooden Spoons | First Season | Number of Seasons | Wooden Spoons |
|---|---|---|---|---|
| Bankers | 1 | 1877 | 1 | 1877 |
| Kensington | 2 | 1877 | 4 | 1878,1879 |
| Adelaide (I) | 1 | 1877 | 4 | 1880 |
| Woodville (1877) | 0 | 1877 | 1 | N/A |
| South Park | 0 | 1877 | 8 | N/A |
| Adelaide (I)-Kensington | 1 | 1881 | 1 | 1881 * |
| Royal Park | 1 | 1882 | 1 | 1882 |
| Victorian (North Adelaide (I) 1883-84) | 2 | 1877 | 8 | 1883,1884 |
| Adelaide (II) (1885-1893) | 4 | 1885 | 9 | 1885, 1891, 1892, 1893 |
| West Adelaide (1887) | 1 | 1887 | 1 | 1887 |
| Hotham (North Adelaide (II) 1888) | 0 | 1887 | 2 | N/A |
| Gawler | 1 | 1887 | 4 | 1890 |
| Natives (West Torrens) | 1 | 1895 | 2 | 1895 |

Notes: Adelaide Football Club merged with Kensington for 1881 and resigned after 4 games (excluding 1 forfeit)
Victorian in 1883 and Hotham in 1888 both renamed to North Adelaide but have no connection with the current SANFL North Adelaide (which joined in 1888 as Medindie and also changed its name to North Adelaide in 1893)
Adelaide (1885-1893) was formed from the merger of the North Adelaide Junior (renamed Adelaide in 1884) and North Parks both junior clubs from the Adelaide and Suburban Football Association.
Natives (formerly Port Natives) after 2 seasons changed their name to West Torrens in 1897 with the introduction of Electoral District Football

== Longest wooden spoon droughts ==
| Club | Time period | Years |
|---|---|---|
| Port Adelaide | 1901-2023 | 123 |
| North Adelaide | 1913-1978 | 66 |
| Norwood | 1920-1968 | 49 |
| Central District | 1978–present | 48 |
| Sturt | 1909-1949 | 41 |
| Norwood | 1878-1913 | 36 |
| West Adelaide | 1937-1972 | 36 |
| Norwood | 1969-2004 | 36 |
| Woodville-West Torrens | 1991–present | 35 |
| West Torrens | 1942-1975 | 34 |
| West Torrens | 1897-1930 | 34 |
| Glenelg | 1967-1998 | 32 |
| Sturt | 1962-1989 | 28 |
| West Adelaide | 1980-2005 | 26 |

== Active wooden spoon drought by Clubs ==
| Club | Last won | Years since |
|---|---|---|
| Central District | 1977 | 49 |
| Woodville-West Torrens | never | 35 |
| Norwood | 2004 | 22 |
| South Adelaide | 2010 | 16 |
| Sturt | 2012 | 14 |
| Glenelg | 2014 | 12 |
| North Adelaide | 2017 | 9 |
| Adelaide (AFL Crows Reserves) | 2018 | 8 |
| West Adelaide | 2025 | 1 |
| Port Adelaide | 2026 | 0 |

== Consecutive Wooden Spoons ==
Six clubs have finished last in 4 or more consecutive seasons. Glenelg and West Adelaide having done so twice.

| Club | Consecutive Wooden Spoons | Sequence of Seasons |
|---|---|---|
| Sturt | 8 | 1989–1996 |
| Woodville | 6 | 1980–1985 |
| Glenelg | 5 | 1921–1925 |
| West Adelaide | 5 | 2019–2023 |
| Norwood | 4 | 1913–1915, 1919 |
| South Adelaide | 4 | 1926–1929 |
| Glenelg | 4 | 1937–1940 |
| West Adelaide | 4 | 2005–2008 |
