= List of SANFL minor premiers =

The South Australian National Football League (SANFL) minor premiership is awarded to the team that finishes on top of the minor round ladder at the end of the Home and Away season.

There were no Grand Finals contested between 1877 (the inaugural season) and 1897, hence the Minor Premier was also the Premiership winner. There were 3 exceptions -
For 1877 the inaugural season - the two top teams were declared joint Champions. Each team had played a different total of games against slightly different opponents but had only both lost one game each. The 3rd-place team finished with more points (from more games played) but had lost 3 games.
In 1889 there was a play off as the two teams finished the season on the same points.
In 1894 the season was divided into two halves - 1st and 2nd Round. The winner of each round then competed in a Premiership playoff.

Premiership decided without any form of Play Off or Grand Final
Premiership decided by a Grand Final
Premiership decided by a Grand Final Replay, after the scheduled Grand Final was drawn

Season	Minor premier	Premiership points	Percentage	Runner-up	Margin	Finish
1877	South Adelaide * Victorians *	22 (13 games); 23 (14 games)	* Joint Premiers (one loss each)	Adelaide I (1877-1880)	25 pts (17 games)	No GF; Playoff
1878	Norwood	20	94.11%	Port Adelaide	4	-
1879	Norwood	19	90.90%	Port Adelaide	7	-
1880	Norwood	15	86.21%	Victorians	2	-
1881	Norwood	23	81.63%	South Adelaide	10	-
1882	Norwood	26	77.59%	South Adelaide	5	-
1883	Norwood	25	70.24%	Port Adelaide	9	-
1884	Port Adelaide	24	71.57%	Norwood; South Adelaide	5	-
1885	South Adelaide	24	66.66%	Norwood	9	-
1886	Adelaide II (1885-1893)	19	53.47%	South Adelaide	1	-
1887	Norwood	28	74.84%	Port Adelaide	2	-
1888	Norwood	30	76.97%	Port Adelaide	1	-
1889	Norwood (1) * Tied	29		Port Adelaide (1) * Tied	0	Premiers
1890	Port Adelaide	32	79.49%	Norwood	2	-
1891	Norwood	26	71.84%	Port Adelaide	2	-
1892	South Adelaide	29	79.14%	Port Adelaide	6	-
1893	South Adelaide	29	69.37%	Norwood	2	-
1894	Norwood (2) * 2nd Round			South Adelaide (1) * 1st Round	N/A	Premiers
1895	South Adelaide	30	74.69%	Norwood	7	-
1896	South Adelaide	34		Norwood	12	-
1897	Port Adelaide	29	72.68%	South Adelaide	3	-
1898	South Adelaide (1)	24	70.33%	Port Adelaide (2)	2	Premiers
1899	South Adelaide (2)	18	59.98%	Norwood (1)	1	Premiers
1900	North Adelaide (1)	19	62.19%	West Torrens (1)	2	Premiers
1901	Norwood (3)	20	64.29%	North Adelaide (1)	4	Premiers
1902	Port Adelaide (2)	20	66.40%	North Adelaide (2)	2	3rd
1903	Port Adelaide (3)	21	71.26%	North Adelaide (3)	1	Premiers
1904	Port Adelaide (4)	21	69.36%	Norwood (2)	2	2nd
1905	North Adelaide (2)	21	66.23%	Port Adelaide (3)	3	Premiers
1906	Port Adelaide (5)	22	68.02%	Norwood (3)	0 (4.82%)	Premiers
1907	Port Adelaide (6)	20	65.70%	Norwood (4)	2	2nd
1908	Norwood (4)	21	61.40%	West Adelaide (1)	1	2nd
1909	Port Adelaide (7)	18	57.26%	West Adelaide (2)	2	2nd
1910	Sturt (1)	22	60.01%	Port Adelaide (4)	0 (0.44%)	2nd
1911	Port Adelaide (8)	22	63.10%	West Adelaide (3)	2	2nd
1912	Port Adelaide (9)	24	67.23%	West Adelaide (4)	10	2nd
1913	Port Adelaide (10)	20	61.58%	West Adelaide (5)	2	Premiers
1914	Port Adelaide (11)	24	67.68%	North Adelaide (4)	12	Premiers
1915	Port Adelaide (12)	19	63.61%	South Adelaide (2)	2	2nd
1919	Sturt (2)	20	57.80%	West Torrens (2)	2	Premiers
1920	North Adelaide (3)	18	59.70%	Port Adelaide (5)	2	Premiers
1921	Port Adelaide (13)	24	64.53%	South Adelaide (3)	6	Premiers
1922	Norwood (5)	24	63.62%	West Torrens (3)	3	Premiers
1923	Norwood (6)	23	55.52%	Sturt (1)	3	Premiers
1924	West Torrens (1)	23	57.38%	Sturt (2)	3	Premiers
1925	Norwood (7)	22	59.70%	Port Adelaide (6)	2	Premiers
1926	Sturt (3)	20	56.05%	Port Adelaide (7)	0 (0.91%)	Premiers
1927	West Adelaide (1)	28	57.18%	North Adelaide (5)	6	Premiers
1928	Port Adelaide (14)	28	54.31%	West Adelaide (6)	2	Premiers
1929	Norwood (8)	27	56.73%	Port Adelaide (8)	1	Premiers
1930	North Adelaide (4)	28	56.48%	Norwood (5)	5	Premiers
1931	Port Adelaide (15)	28	55.96%	Sturt (3)	0 (0.05%)	3rd
1932	North Adelaide (5)	24	54.82%	Norwood (6)	2	2nd
1933	Sturt (4)	26	55.95%	West Torrens (4)	2	3rd
1934	Port Adelaide (16)	21	54.79%	Glenelg (1)	0 (3.17%)	2nd
1935	Port Adelaide (17)	24	55.57%	South Adelaide (4)	2	2nd
1936	Port Adelaide (18)	28	55.94%	Sturt (4)	4	Premiers
1937	Norwood (9)	26	58.12%	Port Adelaide (9)	0 (1.50%)	3rd
1938	South Adelaide (3)	30	59.10%	Norwood (7)	4	Premiers
1939	Port Adelaide (19)	26	55.80%	South Adelaide (5)	2	Premiers
1940	Port Adelaide (20)	28	54.07%	Sturt (5)	2	3rd
1941	Norwood (10)	26	58.07%	Sturt (6)	2	Premiers
1945	Port Adelaide (21)	30	57.03%	Norwood (8)	8	2nd
1946	Norwood (11)	28	57.97%	Port Adelaide (10)	4	Premiers
1947	Norwood (12)	30	57.75%	Port Adelaide (11)	2	2nd
1948	Norwood (13)	28	56.75%	West Torrens (5)	2	Premiers
1949	North Adelaide (6)	24	55.40%	Norwood (9)	0 (1.82%)	Premiers
1950	Norwood (14)	26	60.75%	Glenelg (2)	2	Premiers
1951	Port Adelaide (22)	34	60.92%	North Adelaide (6)	8	Premiers
1952	North Adelaide (7)	28	56.40%	Port Adelaide (12)	2	Premiers
1953	Port Adelaide (23)	30	58.98%	West Torrens (6)	0 (0.71%)	2nd
1954	Port Adelaide (24)	30	59.52%	West Adelaide (7)	4	Premiers
1955	Port Adelaide (25)	26	56.86%	Norwood (10)	3	Premiers
1956	Port Adelaide (26)	34	65.11%	West Adelaide (8)	9	Premiers
1957	Port Adelaide (27)	31	62.94%	West Adelaide (9)	7	Premiers
1958	North Adelaide (8)	30	57.43%	West Adelaide (10)	0 (0.64%)	3rd
1959	Port Adelaide (28)	34	61.47%	West Adelaide (11)	10	Premiers
1960	Port Adelaide (29)	28	59.66%	North Adelaide (7)	2	3rd
1961	Port Adelaide (30)	30	58.52%	West Adelaide (12)	2	3rd
1962	Port Adelaide (31)	34	60.88%	West Adelaide (13)	8	Premiers
1963	West Torrens (2)	27	56.50%	Port Adelaide (13)	1	3rd
1964	Port Adelaide (32)	34	64.63%	Sturt (7)	0 (3.18%)	2nd
1965	Port Adelaide (33)	34	56.41%	South Adelaide (6)	4	Premiers
1966	Sturt (5)	36	60.89%	Port Adelaide (14)	8	Premiers
1967	North Adelaide (9)	32	58.60%	Sturt (8)	1	3rd
1968	Sturt (6)	36	59.66%	Port Adelaide (15)	6	Premiers
1969	Glenelg (1)	34	63.73%	Sturt (9)	4	2nd
1970	Port Adelaide (34)	35	60.07%	Sturt (10)	1	3rd
1971	North Adelaide (10)	34	55.79%	Port Adelaide (16)	2	Premiers
1972	North Adelaide (11)	32	57.02%	Port Adelaide (17)	2	Premiers
1973	Glenelg (2)	40	60.52%	Sturt (11)	6	Premiers
1974	Sturt (7)	38	62.10%	Port Adelaide (18)	1	Premiers
1975	Norwood (15)	32	57.70%	Glenelg (3)	2	Premiers
1976	Port Adelaide (35)	34	57.45%	Sturt (12)	5	2nd
1977	Port Adelaide (36)	35	59.41%	Glenelg (4)	7	Premiers
1978	Sturt (8)	42	61.81%	Norwood (11)	6	2nd
1979	Central District (1)	31	52.13%	Port Adelaide (19)	3	3rd
1980	Port Adelaide (37)	39	65.31%	Glenelg (5)	1	Premiers
1981	Glenelg (3)	38	57.71%	Port Adelaide (20)	8	2nd
1982	Port Adelaide (38)	33	55.88%	Norwood (12)	3	3rd
1983	West Adelaide (2)	36	57.94%	Sturt (13)	4	Premiers
1984	Port Adelaide (39)	34	55.97%	Glenelg (6)	0 (1.23%)	2nd
1985	North Adelaide (12)	30	52.67%	Norwood (13)	1	2nd
1986	North Adelaide (13)	32	56.67%	Glenelg (7)	6	2nd
1987	North Adelaide (14)	38	57.67%	Port Adelaide (21)	8	Premiers
1988	Port Adelaide (40)	32	56.04%	Central District (1)	1	Premiers
1989	North Adelaide (15)	38	61.32%	Port Adelaide (22)	2	2nd
1990	Port Adelaide (41)	34	60.04%	Glenelg (8)	1	Premiers
1991	South Adelaide (4)	32	56.43%	Woodville-West Torrens (1)	0 (2.45%)	3rd
1992	Port Adelaide (42)	36	57.87%	Woodville-West Torrens (2)	6	Premiers
1993	Woodville-West Torrens (1)	31	57.26%	Port Adelaide (23)	1	Premiers
1994	Woodville-West Torrens (2)	36	58.15%	Port Adelaide (24)	6	2nd
1995	Central District (2)	33	58.06%	Norwood (14)	1	2nd
1996	Central District (3)	30	59.97%	Norwood (15)	0 (3.76%)	2nd
1997	Norwood (16)	34	64.82%	Port Adelaide (25)	9	Premiers
1998	Sturt (9)	32	55.96%	West Adelaide (14)	6	2nd
1999	Port Adelaide (43)	30	54.91%	Woodville-West Torrens (3)	2	Premiers
2000	Woodville-West Torrens (3)	34	61.79%	Central District (2)	6	2nd
2001	Central District (4)	32	57.23%	Port Adelaide (26)	3	Premiers
2002	Central District (5)	36	64.25%	Norwood (16)	2	2nd
2003	Central District (6)	32	62.90%	West Adelaide (15)	2	Premiers
2004	Central District (7)	34	62.90%	Woodville-West Torrens (4)	2	Premiers
2005	Central District (8)	30	58.41%	Woodville-West Torrens (5)	0 (1.26%)	Premiers
2006	Woodville-West Torrens (4)	32	57.14%	North Adelaide (8)	0 (1.94%)	Premiers
2007	Central District (9)	36	62.04%	North Adelaide (9)	11	Premiers
2008	Glenelg (4)	32	57.48%	Sturt (14)	2	2nd
2009	Glenelg (5)	35	55.81%	Central District (3)	4	3rd
2010	Central District (10)	30	56.69%	Glenelg (9)	0 (1.21%)	Premiers
2011	Central District (11)	34	56.83%	Norwood (17)	6	2nd
2012	Norwood (17)	36	62.54%	Central District (4)	10	Premiers
2013	Norwood (18)	34	62.51%	Woodville-West Torrens (6)	8	Premiers
2014	Port Adelaide (44)	24	57.57%	Norwood (18)	2	2nd
2015	Woodville-West Torrens (5)	32	58.17%	Port Adelaide (27)	6	2nd
2016	Woodville-West Torrens (6)	28	58.64%	South Adelaide (7)	0 (1.98%)	2nd
2017	Woodville-West Torrens (7)	28	54.92%	Port Adelaide (28)	2	3rd
2018	Norwood (19)	28	57.42%	Woodville-West Torrens (7)	3	2nd
2019	Glenelg (6)	28	58.44%	Port Adelaide (29)	2	Premiers
2020	Woodville-West Torrens (8)	28	61.03%	North Adelaide (10)	2	Premiers
2021	Glenelg (7)	34	57.47%	Woodville-West Torrens (8)	8	2nd
2022	North Adelaide (16)	26	57.18%	Adelaide (AFL Crows Reserves) (1)	2	2nd
2023	Glenelg (8)	30	59.24%	Sturt (15)	2	Premiers
2024	Norwood (20)	30	61.13%	Sturt (16)	0 (1.2%)	2nd
2025	Sturt (10)	34	63.86%	Glenelg (10)	4	Premiers
2026	Norwood (21)	30	63.28%	Glenelg (11)	0 (6.39%)	Premiers

== Minor Premiership Rankings ==
Club	Minor Premierships	Runner up	Total Top Two	Comments
Port Adelaide	44	28	72	Inaugural club in First Season 1877. Currently competes as AFL Port Power Reserves until 2028.
Norwood	21	18	39	First season 1878 after formation.
North Adelaide	16	10	26	First season 1888 after joining from Adelaide Suburban Association. 3rd Club to be called North Adelaide after Victorian (1884) and Hotham (1888). Originally called Medindie until 1893.
Central District	11	4	15	First season 1964 after formation in 1959 as a Reserves B Grade Club.
Sturt	10	16	26	First season 1901 after formation.
Glenelg	8	11	19	First season 1921 after formation in 1920 as a Reserves B Grade Club.
Woodville-West Torrens	8	8	16	First season 1991 after merger of Woodville and West Torrens.
South Adelaide	4	7	11	Inaugural club in First Season 1877.
West Adelaide	2	15	17	First season 1897 after joining from Adelaide Suburban Association.
West Torrens *	2	6	8	First two seasons as Natives 1895-96. Renamed to West Torrens in 1897. Merged with Woodville at the end of 1990 season to form Woodville-West Torrens.
Victorian *	1	1	2	Inaugural club in First Season 1877. Renamed to North Adelaide in 1883 and resigned and folded before the 1885 season commenced. No connection with the current North Adelaide.
Adelaide II *	1	0	1	Formed in 1885 from merger of North Adelaide Junior (renamed Adelaide in 1884) and North Parks from Adelaide Suburban Association. Folded at end of 1893. No connection with the former Old Adelaide Football.
Adelaide	0	1	1	AFL Crows Reserves

- Defunct Clubs

== See also ==
- List of SANFL premiers
