= Ken Farmer =

Australian rules footballer and coach

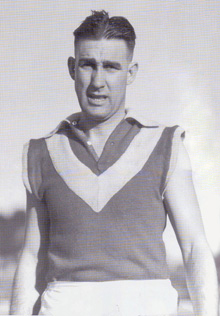
- Farmer in 1933

Personal information
- Full name: Kenneth William George Farmer
- Born: 25 July 1910; North Adelaide, South Australia
- Died: 5 March 1982 (aged 71); Modbury, South Australia
- Height: 178 cm (5 ft 10 in)
- Position: Full-forward

Playing career^{1}
Years	Club	Games (Goals)
1929–1941	North Adelaide	224 (1417)

Representative team honours
Years	Team	Games (Goals)
1930–1941	South Australia	17 (81)

Coaching career
Years	Club	Games (W–L–D)
1949–1952	North Adelaide	76 (53–23–0)
- ^{1} Playing statistics correct to the end of 1941.

Career highlights
- 2× SANFL Premiership player: (1930, 1931); 2× SANFL Premiership coach: (1949, 1952); 13x North Adelaide leading goal-kicker (1929–1941); 11x SANFL Leading Goalkicker (1930–1940); North Adelaide captain: (1934–35, 1937–38, 1941); North Adelaide Best & Fairest 1936; South Australian State Coach 1954; North Adelaide Football Club Team of the Century – Full-forward; SANFL Team of the Century – Full-forward; Official Icon of the North Adelaide Football Club; Australian Football Hall of Fame (1998), Legend (2025); South Australian Football Hall of Fame, inducted 2002

Kenneth William George Farmer (25 July 1910 – 5 March 1982) was an Australian rules footballer who played for the North Adelaide Football Club in the South Australian National Football League (SANFL).

Dubbed the 'Bradman of football' in South Australia (contemporary East Fremantle footballer George Doig was given the same nickname in Western Australia), Farmer is the most prolific full-forward in elite Australian rules football. He is the only SANFL player to have scored 1,000 or more career goals in premiership matches, and also coached North Adelaide to two premierships.

== Early life ==
Farmer was the eldest of two sons born to William Thomas Farmer, a labourer, and Ethel Ann (née Sitters). His younger brother, Elliott Maxwell, was born on 16 December 1911. Farmer was born and raised in North Adelaide and attended North Adelaide Public School, where he played Australian rules football on Fridays, and soccer on Saturdays. His early prowess in the round ball code resulted in being selected in the State Schoolboys soccer team.

Farmer left school at 14, as was common at the time, to work as a junior storeman with Swallow & Ariell Ltd. He did not play football again until 1927, when he played with North Adelaide Ramblers Seconds and the Marryatville amateur team. In 1928 he was invited to play with the North Adelaide juniors, where he demonstrated some talent at marking and goal kicking, winning the best and fairest award.

== Playing career ==
In 1929, the 18-year-old Farmer debuted in the North Adelaide League side. Playing at full-forward in his first season, he kicked an impressive 62 goals in only 14 games.

The following season was a special one marred by tragedy. Shortly after becoming the first SANFL player to kick 100 goals in a season, Farmer suffered the shock loss of his brother Elliott on 5 September when, on the way home, their motorcycle collided head-on with a truck on Frome Road. Both brothers were thrown from the vehicle, with Elliott suffering severe head injuries while Ken sustained a sprained ankle. Elliott was taken to Adelaide Hospital but died shortly after admission, while Ken was able to return home after treatment. The shock of losing his younger brother, with whom Farmer was very close, and who was well known at the football club due to taking Ken to and from football training, was enough for Farmer to announce that he would not play football again that season. News of the incident also reached Melbourne, where it was published in the Sporting Globe. In later years, Farmer was said to suffer long periods of depression, most likely as a result of this accident.

Farmer played in the winning 1930 Grand Final side despite the great personal distress of his brother's death weeks earlier. In the 1931 Grand Final, which North Adelaide would go on to win, Farmer kicked his 125th goal for the season, breaking Gordon Coventry's VFL and elite-football record of 124 goals.

Farmer captained North for five seasons (1934–1935, 1937–1938, and 1941) and was club's best and fairest player in 1936. Despite his imposing record, his best performance in the Magarey Medal count was only fourth.

Farmer's goal-scoring prowess was also evident when representing South Australia in interstate matches, where he averaged five goals per game. His performances, especially against Victoria, attracted the attention of several Melbourne-based clubs who made offers for his signature, but he never accepted.

Farmer's playing career ended during World War II when he went into the RAAF, where he served as a sergeant from April 1942 to July 1946.

== Coaching career ==
Although Farmer's reputation as a legend of Australian rules football rests on his playing achievements, his success as a coach is often underrated. In his four seasons as coach, North Adelaide made it to the grand final on three occasions for two victories. As someone who was years ahead of his peers in his understanding of Australian rules football during his playing days, Farmer was also considered well ahead of his time as a coach, in terms of his attention to detail and ability to prepare his teams both physically and mentally.

Farmer returned to North Adelaide after the war and was appointed coach of their reserves side in 1948. He took over as senior coach from Haydn Bunton, Sr. for the 1949 SANFL season and took the Roosters to the minor premiership before guiding them to their seventh SANFL flag. He was reappointed coach for the following season, in which the club finished fifth.

After losing to Port Adelaide in the 1951 SANFL Grand Final, Farmer decided to retire, but upon being inundated with requests to continue, informed the club he would coach for one more season.

In the lead-up to the 1952 SANFL season, while waiting for official clearance to resume coaching duties, Farmer shared with the Adelaide press that he believed the two main positional weaknesses that had prevented North Adelaide from winning the premiership in 1951 was in the roving and goal kicking department, and he had identified some country footballers to try out for the positions.

== Goal kicking record ==
In South Australia, Farmer was known as the "Bradman of goal kickers", a reference to the contemporary prolific cricket run scorer Donald Bradman. Farmer's goal kicking was certainly prolific.

His SANFL goal kicking record was as follows:

- 1929: 62 goals
- 1930: 105 goals
- 1931: 126 goals
- 1932: 102 goals
- 1933: 112 goals
- 1934: 106 goals
- 1935: 128 goals
- 1936: 134 goals
- 1937: 108 goals
- 1938: 112 goals
- 1939: 113 goals
- 1940: 123 goals
- 1941: 86 goals

In 13 seasons and 224 games for North Adelaide, Farmer kicked 1,417 goals, making him the highest goal scorer in the history of the SANFL and elite Australian rules football, a record that stands to this day. He won the club leading goal-kicker award in every season he played, and won the league leading goal-kicker award in all except his first and last seasons at SANFL level.

Farmer's average of 6.33 goals per game exceeds that of VFL/AFL legends John Coleman, Peter McKenna, Gordon Coventry and Tony Lockett (who holds the VFL/AFL record of 1360 goals), as well as WAFL legends Bernie Naylor and Austin Robertson Junior.

On 35 occasions, Farmer kicked 10 goals or more, and he was held goalless only once, when he was carried off injured after 10 minutes of play. His highest goal tally in a year was 134 in 1936, but rather than kicking more in a season, he kicked 100 goals 11 times: his 1936 tally was a record until 1969, when it was broken by Fred Phillis of Glenelg.

Farmer also played 17 interstate football games for South Australia and kicked 81 goals: if these matches are considered, he played 241 senior career matches and kicked 1498 senior career goals (at an average of 6.22 goals per game).

Farmer also played 11 matches and kicked 47 goals in the SANFL reserves in 1928 for North Adelaide: if these are also considered, he played a total of 252 overall career games and kicked 1,545 overall career goals (at an average of 6.13 goals per game), including 235 career matches and 1464 career goals across the SANFL in seniors and reserves matches (at an average of 6.23 goals per game).

Farmer also holds the equal record for most goals kicked in a SANFL or elite Australian rules football match, kicking 23.6 against West Torrens out of his side's score of 26.11 in 1940.

Farmer's highest individual goal tally against the other six SANFL clubs was as follows:

- South Adelaide: 16 goals
- Glenelg: 15 goals
- Norwood: 13 goals
- West Adelaide: 13 goals
- Sturt: 13 goals
- Port Adelaide: 12 goals

== Personal life ==
Farmer married Floris Edna Craig, a shop assistant, on 21 December 1935 at St Cuthbert's Anglican Church in Prospect. They had one son, Milton, born in 1941. Farmer saw his son for the first time after returning from war service.

Outside of football, Farmer worked as a sales representative, chiefly for G. & R. Wills & Co. Ltd, before retiring in 1970.

Farmer died on 5 March 1982 at Modbury and was cremated. He was survived by his wife, son and grandchildren.

== Legacy ==
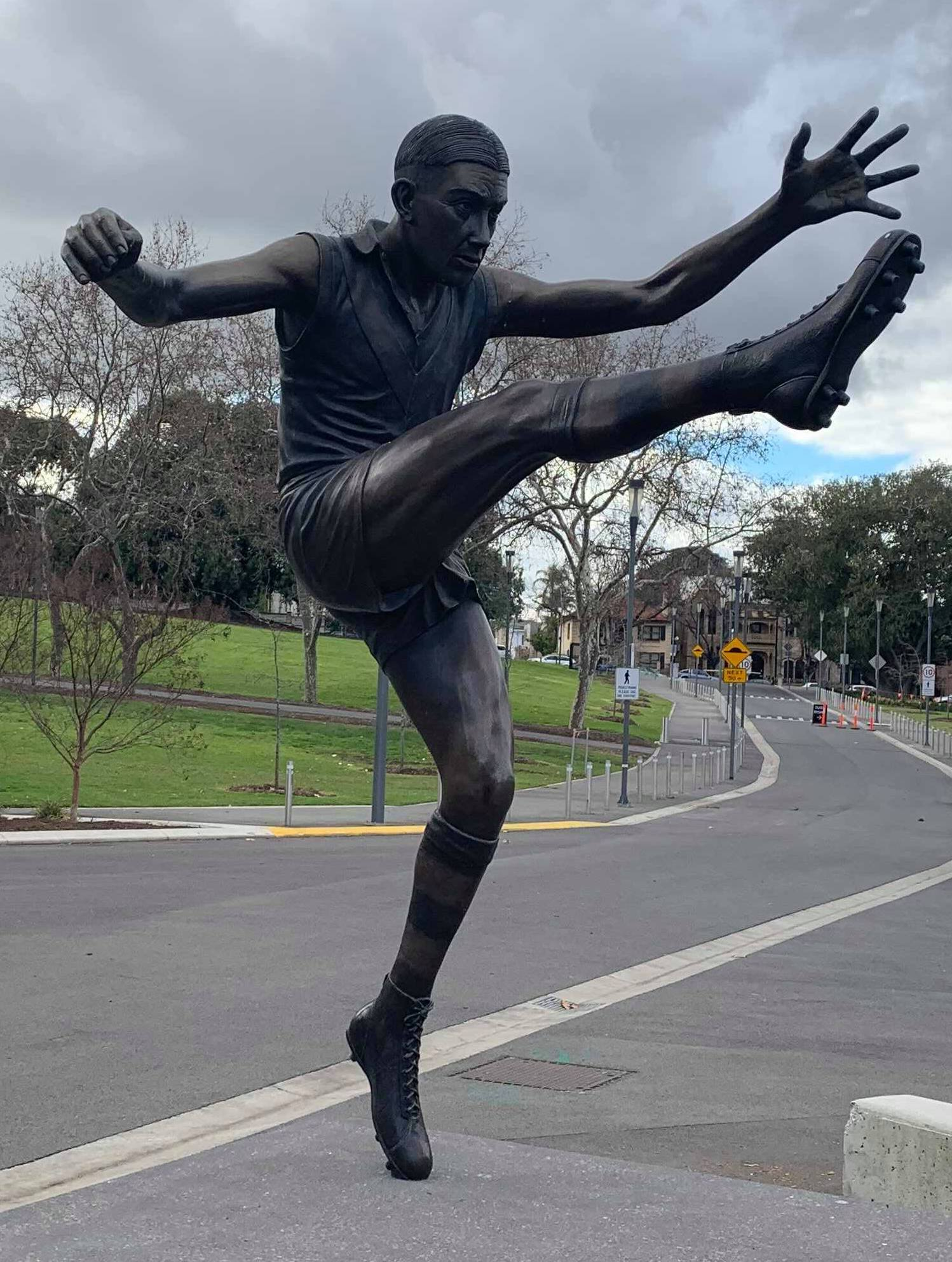
Ken Farmer's statue at Adelaide Oval

Farmer was made a life member of the North Adelaide Football Club in 1937. In 1980, the Ken Farmer Gates were dedicated on the eastern side of North Adelaide's home ground, Prospect Oval. Since 1981, the leading goalkicker in the SANFL each season has been awarded the Ken Farmer Medal.

Farmer has been named as an official 'icon' of the North Adelaide Football Club, and in 2000 was selected as full-forward in North Adelaide's official Team of the Twentieth Century. In 2012, the club named the northern end of Prospect Oval the Ken Farmer End.

Farmer was inducted into the Australian Football Hall of Fame in 1998, and was elevated to Legend status in 2025. He was an inaugural inductee to the SANFL Hall of Fame in 2002.

== Bibliography ==
- Ross, John (1999). The Australian Football Hall of Fame. Australia: HarperCollinsPublishers. p. 65. ISBN 978-0-7322-6426-0.
- North Adelaide Football Club,"Icons of the Club" Retrieved 16 October 2006
