= James Prideaux (footballer) =

Australian rules footballer

Personal information
- Nicknames: Jim, Jack
- Original team: Semaphore Central

Playing career
Years	Club	Games (Goals)
1933-1936	Port Adelaide	63 (276)

Career highlights
- Port Adelaide premiership player (1936); 3x Port Adelaide leading goalkicker (1934, 1935, 1936)

James Prideaux was an Australian rules footballer for Port Adelaide. In 1935 Prideaux kicked 95 goals for the season, a record for the club at the time and not bettered by a Port Adelaide player until 1980 by Tim Evans 45 years later.

In 1933, his debut year for Port Adelaide, he kicked 22 goals. Then followed this with efforts of 73, 95 and 86, retiring in 1936.
