= 1902 SAFA Grand Final =

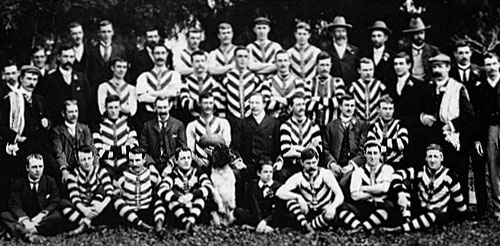

North Adelaide	South Adelaide
9.14 (68)	4.7 (31)
	1	2	3	4
NTH	3.2 (20)	4.2 (26)	8.8 (56)	9.14 (68)
STH	1.3 (9)	3.4 (22)	3.6 (24)	4.7 (31)
- Date: Saturday, 6 September (2:10 pm)
- Stadium: Adelaide Oval

The 1902 SAFL Grand Final was an Australian rules football competition. North Adelaide beat South Adelaide 68 to 31.

== Background ==
During the 1902 season Port Adelaide finished the minor round on the top of the SAFA league ladder. Under the new Argus finals system in place, Port Adelaide would have had the right to challenge the winner of the major round to a grand final for the premiership.

However, Port Adelaide disputed the use of umpire Mr Kneebone for its semi-final game against South Adelaide as he was not credited at the beginning of the season, not appointed according to procedure, and that the club had been dissatisfied with his performances in previous years. Subsequently, Port Adelaide abandoned the match in protest. The association subsequently disqualified Port Adelaide from the remainder of the season, stripping it of its challenge right.

As such, the Grand Final was played between first semi-final winners North Adelaide, and Port Adelaide's second semi-final opponent South Adelaide.

== Teams ==
1902 Premiership Team
B:	William Dawkins	Alec Ewers	George Carter
HB:	Terry Bradley	Norm Clark	Norman Claxton
C:	Jack Rees	Phil Sandland	Norman Pash
HF:	Jimmy Matthews	Frederick Dickenson	Norman Lemon
F:	John Earl	Ernie Johns	Anthony "Bos" Daly
Foll:	Charles Fotheringham	Jack "Dinny" Reedman (c)	Charlie Jessop
Coach:	n/a		
