= 1956 SANFL season =

77th season of the South Australian National Football League

- Teams: 10
- Premiers: Port Adelaide; 17th premiership
- Minor premiers: Port Adelaide; 26th minor premiership
- Magarey Medallist: Dave Boyd; Port Adelaide
- Ken Farmer Medallist: Rex Johns; Port Adelaide (70 Goals)

Attendance
- Matches played: 76
- Total attendance: 765,727 (10,075 per match)
- Highest: 45,514 (Grand Final, Port Adelaide vs. West Adelaide)

The 1956 South Australian National Football League season was the 77th season of the top-level Australian rules football competition in South Australia.

== Ladder ==
1956 SANFL Ladder
Pos	Team	Pld	W	L	D	PF	PA	PP	Pts
1	Port Adelaide (P)	18	17	1	0	1700	911	65.11	34
2	West Adelaide	18	12	5	1	1458	1124	56.47	25
3	North Adelaide	18	10	8	0	1330	1176	53.07	20
4	Norwood	18	10	8	0	1373	1407	49.39	20
5	West Torrens	18	6	11	1	1322	1365	49.20	13
6	Glenelg	18	6	11	1	1279	1612	44.24	13
7	South Adelaide	18	6	12	0	1244	1566	44.27	12
8	Sturt	18	3	14	1	1152	1697	40.44	7

Rules for classification: 1) points; 2) percentage; 3) number of points for.
(P) Premiers

== Finals Series ==
=== Grand Final ===
1956 SANFL Grand Final
Saturday 29 September (2:10 pm)	Port Adelaide	def.	West Adelaide	Adelaide Oval (crowd: 45,514)	Report
3.2 (20); 4.5 (29); 8.8 (56); 12.9 (81)	Q1; Q2; Q3; Final	1.5 (11); 4.8 (32); 5.9 (39); 9.11 (65)
