= 1902 SAFA season =

1902 SAFA premiership season
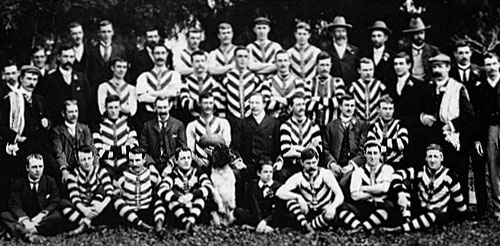
- 26th SAFA season North Adelaide, premiers
- Teams: 7
- Premiers: North Adelaide; 2nd premiership
- Minor premiers: Port Adelaide; 2nd minor premiership
- Magarey Medallist: Tom MacKenzie; West Torrens
- Leading goalkicker: Jack Kay; South Adelaide (28 Goals)
- Matches played: 45
- Highest: (Grand Final, North Adelaide vs. South Adelaide)

The 1902 South Australian Football Association season was the 26th season of the top-level Australian rules football competition in South Australia.

The 1902 premiership was won by the North Adelaide Football Club for the second time. Minor premier Port Adelaide was disqualified from the Finals and relegated to third overall after refusing to play the second semi-final against South Adelaide due to a dispute over the umpire chosen. Sturt, in its second season, received its second consecutive wooden spoon.

== Minor round ==
=== Round 1 ===
	Round 1
Saturday, 3 May	South Adelaide 4.13 (37)	def.	West Torrens 4.8 (32)	Adelaide Oval
Saturday, 3 May	Norwood 13.9 (87)	def.	West Adelaide 3.3 (21)	Norwood Oval
Saturday, 3 May	Port Adelaide 8.11 (59)	def.	North Adelaide 4.7 (31)	Alberton Oval
	Bye; Sturt
Port Adelaide wore its famous black and white prison bar guernsey for the first time.

== Ladder ==
1902 SAFA Ladder
Pos	Team	Pld	W	L	D	PF	PA	PP	Pts
1	Port Adelaide	12	10	2	0	672	340	66.40	20
2	North Adelaide (P)	12	9	3	0	639	380	62.71	18
3	South Adelaide	12	8	3	1	548	384	58.80	17
4	West Torrens	12	6	6	0	512	432	54.24	12
5	Norwood	12	6	6	0	501	497	50.20	12
6	West Adelaide	12	1	10	1	372	808	31.53	3
7	Sturt	12	1	11	0	231	643	26.43	2

Rules for classification: 1) points; 2) percentage; 3) number of points for.
(P) Premiers

Click here for source

== Finals Series ==
After three seasons of using major round systems involving all clubs, the SAFA adopted the Argus finals system involving only the top four teams for the first time.

=== First Semi-final ===
Saturday, 30 August	North Adelaide 6.9 (45)	def.	West Torrens 1.3 (9)	Adelaide Oval

=== Second Semi-final ===
Monday, 1 September	Port Adelaide (Forfeit)	def. by	South Adelaide	Adelaide Oval

The second semi-final was forfeited by Port Adelaide owing to its objection to the appointment of umpire Phil Kneebone to the match. South Adelaide played a hastily arranged exhibition match against North Adelaide to entertain the spectators who had turned up.

Kneebone had been an SAFA umpire up to the 1901 season, but had not returned in 1902. Late in the season, in response to a shortage of umpires, the SAFA umpire committee had made a resolution to extend an invitation to Kneebone, which Kneebone had declined. Still facing a shortage of available first-rate umpires for the second semi-final, the committee appointed Kneebone, which he this time accepted. Port Adelaide objected to this on two grounds: procedural in that the committee had not passed a new resolution to invite or appoint Kneebone – the committee held that the previous resolution to invite had not lapsed, even though the invite itself had been rejected – and that the club was dissatisfied with Kneebone's performances in previous seasons. Port Adelaide advised the SAFA on the Saturday before the match of its intention to forfeit if Kneebone's appointment stood. The SAFA did not acquiesce, and on the day of the match, Port Adelaide formally forfeited in writing.

At the time of its forfeiture, Port Adelaide as minor premier was entitled to a challenge match for the premiership, irrespective of other major round results. However, in a special SAFA meeting on Wednesday 3 September, the association voted to disqualify Port Adelaide from the remainder of the season, stripping it of this right. At the same meeting, the association affirmed Port Adelaide's procedural objection that Kneebone's appointment was not per procedure, finding that only the full association, not the umpire's committee, had the power to appoint a non-association umpire to the association. Kneebone went on to umpire the following week's grand final.

At a separate meeting on 8 September, the formal matter of second place was discussed, with a conflict arising between the convention that the losing grand finalist (South Adelaide) be considered runners-up, but rule 29 stating that minor placings be decided on overall premiership points (Port Adelaide). The Association ruled South Adelaide be considered runners-up, relegating Port Adelaide to third.

=== Grand final ===
	1902 SAFA Grand Final
6 September 1902	North Adelaide 9.14 (68)	def.	South Adelaide 4.7 (31)	Adelaide Oval
