= 1963 SANFL season =

- Teams: 8
- Premiers: Port Adelaide; 22nd premiership
- Minor premiers: West Torrens; 2nd minor premiership
- Magarey Medallist: Geof Motley; Port Adelaide
- Ken Farmer Medallist: Rex Johns; Port Adelaide (54 Goals)

Attendance
- Matches played: 84
- Total attendance: 869,278 (10,349 per match)
- Highest: 52,688 (Grand Final, Port Adelaide vs. North Adelaide)

The 1963 South Australian National Football League season was the 84th season of the top-level Australian rules football competition in South Australia.

== Ladder ==
1963 SANFL Ladder
Pos	Team	Pld	W	L	D	PF	PA	PP	Pts
1	West Torrens	20	13	6	1	1547	1191	56.50	27
2	Port Adelaide (P)	20	13	7	0	1775	1170	60.27	26
3	North Adelaide	20	12	7	1	1582	1516	51.07	25
4	West Adelaide	20	12	8	0	1533	1323	53.68	24
5	Norwood	20	11	9	0	1486	1553	48.90	22
6	Sturt	20	10	10	0	1403	1587	46.92	20
7	Glenelg	20	6	14	0	1459	1861	43.95	12
8	South Adelaide	20	2	18	0	1382	1966	41.28	4

Rules for classification: 1) points; 2) percentage; 3) number of points for.
(P) Premiers

== Finals Series ==
=== Grand Final ===
1963 SANFL Grand Final
Saturday, 5 October (2:10 pm)	Port Adelaide	def.	North Adelaide	Adelaide Oval (crowd: 52,688)
5.8 (38); 5.9 (39); 7.9 (51); 11.14 (80)	Q1; Q2; Q3; Final	1.1 (7); 5.4 (34); 5.9 (39); 6.11 (47)
