= 1958 SANFL season =

79th season of the top-level Australian rules football league

- Teams: 8
- Premiers: Port Adelaide; 19th premiership
- Minor premiers: North Adelaide; 8th minor premiership
- Magarey Medallist: Lindsay Head; West Torrens
- Ken Farmer Medallist: Rex Johns; Port Adelaide (55 Goals)

Attendance
- Matches played: 76
- Total attendance: 848,093 (11,159 per match)
- Highest: 54,282 (Grand Final, Port Adelaide vs. West Adelaide)

The 1958 South Australian National Football League season was the 79th season of the top-level Australian rules football competition in South Australia.

== Ladder ==
1958 SANFL Ladder
Pos	Team	Pld	W	L	D	PF	PA	PP	Pts
1	North Adelaide	18	15	3	0	1705	1264	57.43	30
2	West Adelaide	18	15	3	0	1806	1374	56.79	30
3	Port Adelaide (P)	18	13	5	0	1754	1203	59.32	26
4	Norwood	18	7	10	1	1389	1559	47.12	15
5	West Torrens	18	7	10	1	1400	1581	46.96	15
6	South Adelaide	18	6	11	1	1255	1531	45.05	13
7	Glenelg	18	5	13	0	1357	1661	44.96	10
8	Sturt	18	2	15	1	1360	1853	42.33	5

Rules for classification: 1) points; 2) percentage; 3) number of points for.
(P) Premiers

== Grand final ==
1958 SANFL Grand Final
Saturday, 27 September (2:10 pm)	West Adelaide	def. by	Port Adelaide	Adelaide Oval (crowd: 54,282)
3.0 (18); 8.3 (51); 13.6 (84); 14.8 (92)	Q1; Q2; Q3; Final	4.3 (27); 7.5 (47); 11.8 (74); 14.10 (94)
