= 1896 SAFA season =

1896 SAFA premiership season
- Teams: 5
- Premiers: South Adelaide; 5th premiership
- Leading goalkicker: Jack Kay; South Adelaide (25 goals)
- Matches played: 40

The 1896 South Australian Football Association season was the 20th season of the top-level Australian rules football competition in South Australia.

During the 1896 season a rule was introduced for North Adelaide and the Natives (renamed West Torrens for the 1897 season) allowing them to field an extra three players to be more competitive with the three more established clubs. The Native team played the majority of their games at Kensington despite many of their players living in the Port area.|

== Ladder ==
1896 SAFA Ladder
	TEAM	P	W	L	D	GF	BF	GA	BA	Pts
1	South Adelaide (P)	18	16	0	2	128	134	60	86	34
2	Norwood	18	10	6	2	104	144	71	112	22
3	North Adelaide	16	5	10	1	52	105	80	118	11
4	Natives	16	4	10	2	44	81	77	118	10
5	Port Adelaide	18	4	13	1	66	118	101	143	9
Key: P = Played, W = Won, L = Lost, D = Drawn, GF = Goals For, BF = Behinds For, GA = Goals Against, BA = Behinds Against, (P) = Premiers										

Notes – South Adelaide, Norwood and Port Adelaide played each other 5 times but only 4 times against North Adelaide and Natives.
North Adelaide and Natives forfeited to South Adelaide once each.
