= 1932 SANFL season =

- Teams: 8
- Premiers: Sturt; 4th premiership
- Minor premiers: North Adelaide; 5th minor premiership
- Magarey Medallist: Max Pontifex; West Torrens
- Ken Farmer Medallist: Ken Farmer; North Adelaide (102 Goals); Jack Owens; Glenelg (goals 102)
- Matches played: 72
- Highest: 29,717 (Grand Final, Sturt vs. North Adelaide)

The 1932 South Australian National Football League season was the 53rd season of the top-level Australian rules football competition in South Australia.

== Ladder ==
1932 SANFL Ladder
| Pos | Team | Pld | W | L | D | PF | PA | PP | Pts |
|---|---|---|---|---|---|---|---|---|---|
| 1 | North Adelaide | 17 | 12 | 5 | 0 | 1718 | 1416 | 54.82 | 24 |
| 2 | Norwood | 17 | 11 | 6 | 0 | 1474 | 1403 | 51.23 | 22 |
| 3 | Port Adelaide | 17 | 10 | 7 | 0 | 1411 | 1419 | 49.86 | 20 |
| 4 | Sturt (P) | 17 | 9 | 7 | 1 | 1460 | 1324 | 52.44 | 19 |
| 5 | West Adelaide | 17 | 9 | 8 | 0 | 1391 | 1354 | 50.67 | 18 |
| 6 | West Torrens | 17 | 8 | 7 | 2 | 1445 | 1429 | 50.28 | 18 |
| 7 | Glenelg | 17 | 5 | 12 | 0 | 1514 | 1686 | 47.31 | 10 |
| 8 | South Adelaide | 17 | 2 | 14 | 1 | 1299 | 1681 | 43.59 | 5 |

Rules for classification: 1) points; 2) percentage; 3) number of points for.
(P) Premiers

== Finals series ==
=== Grand Final ===
1932 SANFL Grand Final
Saturday, 1 October | Sturt | def. | North Adelaide | Adelaide Oval (crowd: 29,717)
4.3 (27); 7.5 (47); 14.11 (95); 16.14 (110) | Q1; Q2; Q3; Final | 2.2 (14); 4.8 (32); 4.9 (33); 10.9 (69)
