= 1945 SANFL season =

- Teams: 8
- Premiers: West Torrens; 3rd premiership
- Minor premiers: Port Adelaide; 21st minor premiership
- Magarey Medallist: Bob Quinn; Port Adelaide (46 votes)
- Ken Farmer Medallist: S Scott; South Adelaide (64 Goals)
- Matches played: 72
- Highest: 47,500 (Grand Final, West Torrens vs. Port Adelaide)

The 1945 South Australian National Football League season was the 66th season of the top-level Australian rules football competition in South Australia.

== Ladder ==
1945 SANFL Ladder
| Pos | Team | Pld | W | L | D | PF | PA | PP | Pts |
|---|---|---|---|---|---|---|---|---|---|
| 1 | Port Adelaide | 17 | 15 | 2 | 0 | 1769 | 1333 | 57.03 | 30 |
| 2 | Norwood | 17 | 11 | 6 | 0 | 1397 | 1291 | 51.97 | 22 |
| 3 | West Torrens (P) | 17 | 10 | 7 | 0 | 1602 | 1647 | 49.31 | 20 |
| 4 | North Adelaide | 17 | 9 | 8 | 0 | 1597 | 1590 | 50.11 | 18 |
| 5 | Sturt | 17 | 8 | 9 | 0 | 1780 | 1446 | 55.18 | 16 |
| 6 | West Adelaide | 17 | 7 | 10 | 0 | 1368 | 1658 | 45.21 | 14 |
| 7 | Glenelg | 17 | 5 | 12 | 0 | 1495 | 1784 | 45.59 | 10 |
| 8 | South Adelaide | 17 | 3 | 14 | 0 | 1450 | 1709 | 45.90 | 6 |

Rules for classification: 1) points; 2) percentage; 3) number of points for.
(P) Premiers

== Finals series ==
=== Grand Final ===
1945 SANFL Grand Final
Saturday, 29 September | West Torrens | def. | Port Adelaide | Adelaide Oval (crowd: 47,500)
2.7 (19); 9.11 (65); 13.17 (95); 15.25 (115) | Q1; Q2; Q3; Final | 8.3 (51); 9.7 (61); 13.11 (89); 15.12 (102)
