= 1955 SANFL season =

- Teams: 10
- Premiers: Port Adelaide; 16th premiership
- Minor premiers: Port Adelaide; 25th minor premiership
- Magarey Medallist: Lindsay Head; West Torrens
- Ken Farmer Medallist: Paul Caust; Sturt (57 Goals)

Attendance
- Matches played: 72
- Total attendance: 813,560 (11,299 per match)
- Highest: 44,826 (Grand Final, Port Adelaide vs. Norwood)

The 1955 South Australian National Football League season was the 76th season of the top-level Australian rules football competition in South Australia.

== Ladder ==
1955 SANFL Ladder
Pos	Team	Pld	W	L	D	PF	PA	PP	Pts
1	Port Adelaide (P)	17	13	4	0	1545	1172	56.86	26
2	Norwood	17	11	5	1	1457	1184	55.17	23
3	West Torrens	17	9	7	1	1412	1226	53.53	19
4	Sturt	17	9	8	0	1315	1253	51.21	18
5	North Adelaide	17	9	8	0	1309	1312	49.94	18
6	Glenelg	17	7	10	0	1355	1503	47.41	14
7	West Adelaide	17	7	10	0	1413	1612	46.71	14
8	South Adelaide	17	2	15	0	966	1510	39.01	4

Rules for classification: 1) points; 2) percentage; 3) number of points for.
(P) Premiers

== Finals ==
=== Grand Final ===
1955 SANFL Grand Final
Saturday 1 October (2:10 pm)	Port Adelaide	def.	Norwood	Adelaide Oval (crowd: 44,826)	Report
4.2 (26); 5.5 (35); 7.6 (48); 15.11 (101)	Q1; Q2; Q3; Final	0.1 (1); 3.5 (23); 4.7 (31); 5.8 (38)
