= 1954 SANFL season =

- Teams: 8
- Premiers: Port Adelaide; 15th premiership
- Minor premiers: Port Adelaide; 24th minor premiership
- Magarey Medallist: Len Fitzgerald; Sturt
- Ken Farmer Medallist: William McKenzie; North Adelaide (67 Goals)

Attendance
- Matches played: 76
- Total attendance: 783,030 (10,303 per match)
- Highest: 42,895 (Grand Final, Port Adelaide vs. West Adelaide)

The 1954 South Australian National Football League season was the 75th season of the top-level Australian rules football competition in South Australia.

== Minor round ==
=== Round 1 ===
Saturday, 24 April (2:10pm)	Glenelg 7.10 (52)	def. by	Norwood 12.12 (84)	Glenelg Oval (crowd: 9,300)
Saturday, 24 April (2:10pm)	North Adelaide 10.8 (68)	def. by	West Adelaide 10.11 (71)	Prospect Oval (crowd: 8,000)
Saturday, 24 April (2:10pm)	Sturt 4.7 (31)	def. by	South Adelaide 11.13 (79)	Unley Oval (crowd: 5,500)
Monday, 26 April (2:10pm)	Port Adelaide 11.11 (77)	def.	West Torrens 10.8 (68)	Adelaide Oval (crowd: 28,000)

== Ladder ==
1954 SANFL Ladder
Pos	Team	Pld	W	L	D	PF	PA	PP	Pts
1	Port Adelaide (P)	18	15	3	0	1720	1170	59.52	30
2	West Adelaide	18	13	5	0	1559	1425	52.25	26
3	West Torrens	18	10	8	0	1412	1377	50.63	20
4	Norwood	18	9	9	0	1467	1393	51.29	18
5	North Adelaide	18	8	10	0	1395	1389	50.11	16
6	Sturt	18	8	10	0	1415	1599	46.95	16
7	South Adelaide	18	5	13	0	1135	1440	44.08	10
8	Glenelg	18	4	14	0	1364	1674	44.90	8

Rules for classification: 1) points; 2) percentage; 3) number of points for.
(P) Premiers

== Finals ==
=== Grand Final ===
1954 SANFL Grand Final
Saturday 2 October (2:10 pm)	Port Adelaide	def.	West Adelaide	Adelaide Oval (crowd: 42,895)	Report
2.4 (16); 3.6 (24); 9.10 (64); 11.13 (79)	Q1; Q2; Q3; Final	7.7 (49); 7.7 (49); 9.12 (66); 10.16 (76)
