= 1928 SANFL season =

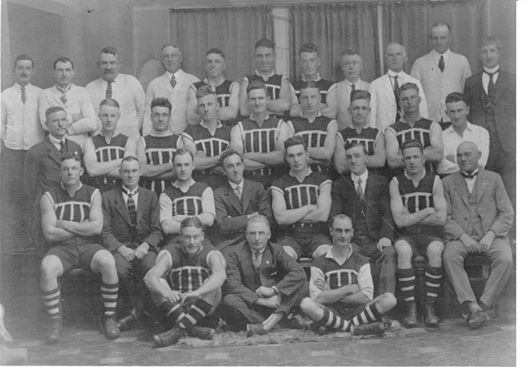
- 48th SAFL season Pictured above is the Port Adelaide premiership team.
- Teams: 8
- Premiers: Port Adelaide; 10th premiership
- Minor premiers: Port Adelaide; 14th minor premiership
- Magarey Medallist: Jim Handby; Glenelg
- Ken Farmer Medallist: Jack Owens; Glenelg (83 Goals)
- Matches played: 72
- Highest: 35,700 (Grand Final, Port Adelaide vs. Norwood)

The 1928 South Australian National Football League season was the 49th season of the top-level Australian rules football competition in South Australia.

== Ladder ==
1928 SANFL Ladder
Pos	Team	Pld	W	L	D	PF	PA	PP	Pts
1	Port Adelaide (P)	17	14	3	0	1487	1251	54.31	28
2	West Adelaide	17	13	4	0	1694	1228	57.97	26
3	Norwood	17	10	7	0	1323	1258	51.26	20
4	North Adelaide	17	9	7	1	1355	1368	49.76	19
5	West Torrens	17	7	8	2	1184	1235	48.95	16
6	Sturt	17	6	9	2	1294	1442	47.30	14
7	Glenelg	17	4	13	0	1397	1652	45.82	8
8	South Adelaide	17	2	14	1	1257	1557	44.67	5

Rules for classification: 1) points; 2) percentage; 3) number of points for.
(P) Premiers

== Finals series ==
=== Grand Final ===
1928 SANFL Grand Final
Saturday, 6 October	Port Adelaide	def.	Norwood	Adelaide Oval (crowd: 35,700)
5.5; 7.8; 10.10; 15.14 (104)	Q1; Q2; Q3; Final	3.2; 4.7; 5.9; 7.14 (56)
