= 1898 SAFA season =

1898 SAFA premiership season
- Teams: 6
- Premiers: South Adelaide; 7th premiership
- Minor premiers: South Adelaide; 1st minor premiership
- Magarey Medallist: Alby Green; Norwood
- Leading goalkicker: Jack Kay; South Adelaide (35 Goals)
- Matches played: 44
- Highest: 7,500 (20 June, South Adelaide vs. Port Adelaide)

The 1898 SAFA season was the 22nd edition of the top level of Australian Rules football to be played in South Australia. South Adelaide went on to record its 7th premiership.

== Background ==
In 1898, the SAFA competition consisted of six teams of 20 on-the-field players each. Electoral zoning of clubs introduced in 1897, which meant that a player was assigned to a club based on his residential address on the South Australian Electoral roll, was still being phased in.

The season was divided into two rounds of 7 games each. The older senior strong clubs South Adelaide, Port Adelaide and Norwood were programmed to play each other twice and the newer clubs North Adelaide, West Torrens and West Adelaide once only.

The three newer clubs were programmed to play each other twice and the older clubs once only.

The 1st Round resulted in a 3 way tie between the 3 strongest oldest clubs - South Adelaide, Port Adelaide and Norwood. Each had won and lost one game each other.

In the 2nd Round, South Adelaide remained undefeated winning all 7 games and thus became the "Minor Premier".

As a result The Football Association decided that Port Adelaide and Norwood should play to decide which of the two was to meet South Adelaide for the premiership.

== Programme ==
1st Round

1st Round Adelaide Oval.— May 7, South v. North ; 14, South v. West ; 21, Port v. South ; 28, North v. West ; 30, Port v. Norwood ;
June 4, North v. West Torrens ; 11, South v. Norwood ; 18, North v. West Torrens ; 20, Port v. South; 25, South v. Norwood ;
July 2, Essendon (intercolonial) ; 9, Port v. Norwood.

1st Round Jubilee Oval.— May 7, Norwood v. West ; 14, Norwood v. West Torrens ; 21, Norwood v. North ; 28, South v. West Torrens ;
June 4, Port v. West ; 11, North v. West ; 25, West v. West Torrens ;

2nd Round

Second round Adelaide Oval — July 16, Port v. South ; 23, South v. Norwood ; 30, Port v. Norwood ;
August 6, Fitzroy (Intercolonial) ; 13, South v. West Torrens ; 20, Port v. Norwood ; 27, Port v. South ;
September 1, South v. Norwood ; 3, Port v. West.

Second Round Jubilee Oval. — July 9, North v. West Torrens ; 16, Norwood v. North ; '23, North v. West ; 30, South v. West ;
August 13, Norwood v. West ; 20, South v. North ; 27, North v. West.

== Ladder (1st Round) ==
1898 SAFA Ladder (1st Round)
	TEAM	P	W	L	D	GF	BF	GA	BA	Pts
1	South Adelaide	7	5	2	0	66	72	22	33	10
2	Port Adelaide	7	5	2	0	53	72	22	35	10
3	Norwood	7	5	2	0	53	61	34	40	10
4	North Adelaide	7	4	3	0	39	49	29	44	8
5	West Torrens	7	2	5	0	17	36	44	83	4
6	West Adelaide	7	0	7	0	12	22	79	97	0
Key: P = Played, W = Won, L = Lost, D = Drawn, GF = Goals For, BF = Behinds For, GA = Goals Against, BA = Behinds Against										

== Ladder (End of 2nd Round) ==
1898 SAFA Ladder
Pos	Team	Pld	W	L	D	PF	PA	PP	Pts
1	South Adelaide (P)	14	12	2	0	806	340	70.33	24
2	Port Adelaide	14	10	4	0	646	324	66.60	20
3	Norwood	14	8	6	0	613	546	52.89	16
4	North Adelaide	14	6	8	0	491	520	48.57	12
5	West Torrens	14	6	8	0	312	481	39.34	12
6	West Adelaide	14	0	14	0	221	878	20.11	0

(P) Premiers

Note: Minor Round
North Adelaide, West Adelaide and West Torrens played each other 4 times, whilst they only played twice against Norwood, Port Adelaide and South Adelaide.
Norwood, Port Adelaide and South Adelaide played each other 4 times and the other 3 clubs twice.
Therefore, each club played 14 minor round games.

== Finals Series ==
=== Week One – Preliminary Final ===
1898 SAFA Preliminary Final
Saturday, 3 September	Port Adelaide	def.	Norwood	Adelaide Oval
1.3 (9); 2.9 (21); 2.12 (24); 4.16 (40)	Q1; Q2; Q3; Final	1.4 (10); 1.4 (10); 2.6 (18); 2.6 (18)	Umpires: Mr. Ford
Port Adelaide, Norwood and South Adelaide were level on wins after the first round of the season. South Adelaide were undefeated in the second round and therefore qualified for the Grand Final. The Football Association decided that the Port Adelaide and the Norwood should play to decide which of the two has to meet South Adelaide for the premiership.

=== Week Two - SAFA Grand Final ===
	1898 SAFA Grand Final
10 September	South Adelaide 8.8 (56)	def.	Port Adelaide 4.8 (32)	Adelaide Oval (crowd: 6,500)

== INTERCOLONIAL Matches ==
The Essendon Football Club the 1897 premiers from the VFL visited Adelaide for 1 week for a series of matches against the leading three clubs from the SAFA. Essendon won two of the three games.

Game 1 v Norwood
Wednesday 29 June 1898	Norwood	def. by	Essendon	Adelaide Oval
0.1; 1.2 (?); 2.1 (?); 3.5 (23)	Q1; Q2; Q3; Final	3.4; 3.4; 4.4; 6.6 (36)	Umpires: Mr. Ford

Game 2 v Port Adelaide
Saturday 5 July 1898	Port Adelaide	def. by	Essendon	Adelaide Oval
0.1; 0.3; 2.3; 4.7 (31)	Q1; Q2; Q3; Final	3.3; 6.6; 8.8; 9.9 (63)

Game 3 v South Adelaide
Tuesday 5 July 1898	South Adelaide	def.	Essendon	Adelaide Oval
0.0; 2.3; 4.4; 4.6 (30)	Q1; Q2; Q3; Final	1.1; 1.2; 1.3; 1.3 (9)	Umpires: J. J. Woods
