= 1972 SANFL season =

- Teams: 10
- Premiers: North Adelaide; 11th premiership
- Minor premiers: North Adelaide; 11th minor premiership
- Magarey Medallist: Malcolm Blight (Woodville)
- Ken Farmer Medallist: Michael Coligan (Norwood) 81 goals

Attendance
- Matches played: 109
- Total attendance: 1,150,514 (10,555 per match)
- Highest: 55,709 (Grand Final, North Adelaide vs. Port Adelaide)

The 1972 South Australian National Football League season was the 93rd season of the top-level Australian rules football competition in South Australia.

== Ladder ==
1972 SANFL Ladder
Pos	Team	Pld	W	L	D	PF	PA	PP	Pts
1	North Adelaide (P)	21	16	5	0	2270	1711	57.02	32
2	Port Adelaide	21	15	6	0	2235	1829	55.00	30
3	Norwood	21	14	6	1	2280	1952	53.88	29
4	Central District	21	14	7	0	2019	1774	53.23	28
5	Sturt	21	11	10	0	2133	1763	54.75	22
6	Glenelg	21	11	10	0	2264	2025	52.79	22
7	West Torrens	21	7	14	0	1728	2023	46.07	14
8	Woodville	21	7	14	0	1951	2515	43.69	14
9	South Adelaide	21	5	16	0	1704	2535	40.20	10
10	West Adelaide	21	4	16	1	1793	2250	44.35	9

Rules for classification: 1) points; 2) percentage; 3) number of points for.
(P) Premiers

== Finals Series ==
=== Grand Final ===
Grand Final
Saturday, 30 September (2:10 pm)	North Adelaide	def.	Port Adelaide	Adelaide Oval (crowd: 55,709)	Report
3.3 (21); 5.6 (36); 13.11 (89); 19.14 (128)	Q1; Q2; Q3; Final	4.6 (30); 6.8 (44); 8.9 (57); 10.12 (72)
Sachse 6 Hearl 3 R. Robran, Marsh, Von Bertouch 2 Rebbeck, Phillips, Plummer, B. Robran, Webb 1	Goals

== 1972 Championship of Australia ==
Championship of Australia Final
Sunday 15 October	North Adelaide	def.	Carlton	Adelaide Oval (crowd: 23,213)
3.5 (23); 5.6 (36); 8.12 (60); 10.13 (73)	Q1; Q2; Q3; Final	3.5 (23); 7.10 (52); 9.11 (65); 10.12 (72)	Umpires: William Deller
A Rebbeck 4 J Plummer 2 D Sachse, D Webb, D Marsh, B Robran 1	Goals	R Walls 3 G Kennedy 2 S Jackson, J Warden, G Crane, T Keogh, J Nicholls 1
The game was played in rain.; North Adelaide received $10,000 in prize money.
