= 1906 SAFA season =

1906 SAFA premiership season
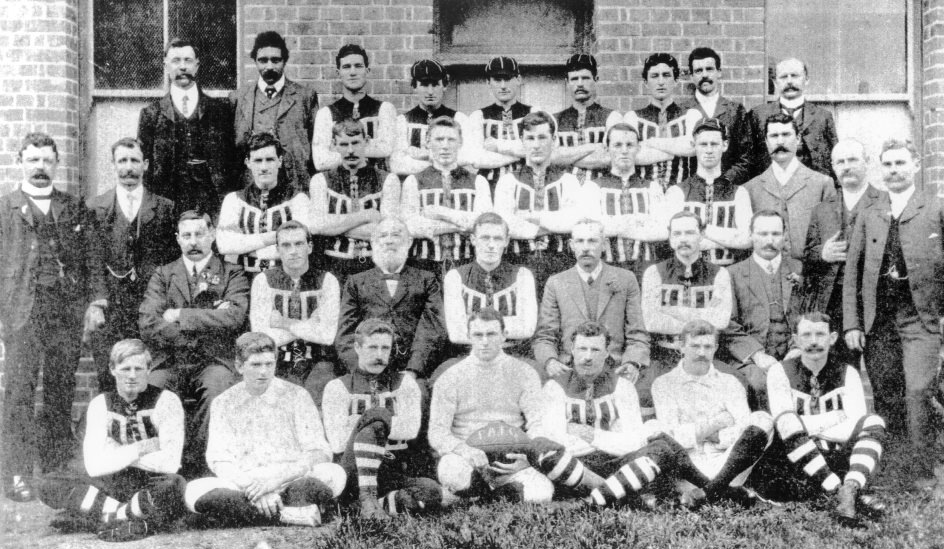
- 30th season Port Adelaide premiership team
- Teams: 7
- Premiers: Port Adelaide; 5th premiership
- Minor premiers: Port Adelaide; 5th minor premiership
- Magarey Medallist: Tom MacKenzie; North Adelaide
- Leading goalkicker: James Mathieson; Port Adelaide (42 goals)
- Matches played: 46
- Highest: 20,000 (Grand Final, Port Adelaide vs. North Adelaide)

The 1906 South Australian Football Association season was the thirtieth season of the top-level Australian rules football competition in South Australia. It was the last season before the league changed its name to the "South Australian Football League".

Defending premiers North Adelaide, affected by the loss of "Dinny" Reedman, struggled early in the season before recovering to reach the challenge final, where a developing champion Port Adelaide team who had been held goalless in the semi-final won by 21 points.

== Minor round ==
=== Round 1 ===
	Round 1
Saturday, 5 May 1906	North Adelaide 9.6 (60)	def.	South Adelaide 3.2 (20)	Adelaide Oval
Saturday, 5 May 1906	Sturt 7.3 (45)	def. by	Port Adelaide 13.13 (91)	Unley Oval
Saturday, 5 May 1906	West Torrens 15.12 (102)	def.	West Adelaide 6.7 (43)	Hindmarsh Oval
	Bye; Norwood

=== Round 2 ===
	Round 2
Saturday, 12 May 1906	South Adelaide 6.9 (45)	drew with	Sturt 7.3 (45)	Adelaide Oval
Saturday, 12 May 1906	Norwood 9.10 (64)	def. by	North Adelaide 4.11 (35)	Norwood Oval
Saturday, 12 May 1906	Port Adelaide 14.11 (95)	def.	West Torrens 0.5 (5)	Alberton Oval
	Bye; West Adelaide

=== Round 3 ===
	Round 3
Saturday, 19 May 1906	Sturt 6.15 (51)	def.	West Adelaide 3.6 (24)	Unley Oval
Saturday, 19 May 1906	Port Adelaide 7.5 (47)	def.	Norwood 3.9 (27)	Adelaide Oval
Saturday, 19 May 1906	West Torrens 6.12 (48)	def. by	South Adelaide 9.11 (65)	Hindmarsh Oval
	Bye; North Adelaide

=== Round 4 ===
	Round 4
Saturday, 26 May 1906	North Adelaide 8.11 (59)	def.	West Adelaide 2.5 (17)	Adelaide Oval
Saturday, 26 May 1906	Port Adelaide 8.8 (56)	def.	South Adelaide 7.6 (48)	Alberton Oval
Saturday, 26 May 1906	Norwood 8.10 (58)	def.	Sturt 4.11 (35)	Norwood Oval
	Bye; West Torrens

=== Round 5 ===
	Round 5
Saturday, 2 June 1906	Norwood 13.12 (90)	def.	West Adelaide 4.5 (29)	Adelaide Oval
Saturday, 2 June 1906	Sturt 6.10 (46)	def.	West Torrens 6.5 (41)	Unley Oval
Saturday, 2 June 1906	North Adelaide 4.6 (30)	def. by	Port Adelaide 8.10 (58)	Hindmarsh Oval
	Bye; South Adelaide

=== Round 6 ===
	Round 6
Saturday, 9 June 1906	North Adelaide 8.8 (56)	def.	Sturt 3.9 (27)	Adelaide Oval
Saturday, 9 June 1906	West Torrens 5.9 (39)	def. by	Norwood 12.17 (89)	Hindmarsh Oval
Saturday, 9 June 1906	South Adelaide 13.15 (93)	def.	West Adelaide 6.5 (41)	Jubilee Oval
	Bye; Port Adelaide

=== Round 7 ===
	Round 7
Saturday, 16 June 1906	North Adelaide 5.6 (36)	def. by	West Torrens 8.9 (57)	Adelaide Oval
Saturday, 16 June 1906	Norwood 6.13 (49)	def.	South Adelaide 6.6 (42)	Norwood Oval
Saturday, 16 June 1906	Port Adelaide 16.16 (112)	def.	West Adelaide 1.7 (13)	Alberton Oval
	Bye; Sturt

=== Round 8 ===
	Round 8
Saturday, 30 June 1906	North Adelaide 3.6 (24)	def. by	Norwood 5.9 (39)	Adelaide Oval
Saturday, 30 June 1906	Port Adelaide 12.12 (84)	def.	Sturt 6.5 (41)	Alberton Oval
Saturday, 30 June 1906	West Torrens 7.15 (57)	def.	West Adelaide 6.7 (43)	Hindmarsh Oval
	Bye; South Adelaide

=== Round 9 ===
	Round 9
Saturday, 7 July 1906	South Adelaide 5.9 (39)	def. by	Norwood 7.9 (51)	Adelaide Oval
Saturday, 7 July 1906	Sturt 12.12 (84)	def.	West Adelaide 5.7 (37)	Unley Oval
Saturday, 7 July 1906	West Torrens 4.13 (37)	def. by	Port Adelaide 16.18 (114)	Hindmarsh Oval
	Bye; North Adelaide

=== Round 10 ===
	Round 10
Saturday, 14 July 1906	West Adelaide 6.13 (49)	def. by	North Adelaide 15.19 (109)	Jubilee Oval
Saturday, 14 July 1906	Norwood 6.15 (51)	def.	West Torrens 5.7 (37)	Norwood Oval
Saturday, 14 July 1906	Sturt 5.10 (40)	def.	South Adelaide 4.7 (31)	Unley Oval
	Bye; Port Adelaide

=== Round 11 ===
	Round 11
Saturday, 21 July 1906	South Adelaide 11.10 (76)	def.	West Adelaide 4.2 (26)	Adelaide Oval
Saturday, 21 July 1906	Norwood 11.13 (79)	def.	Port Adelaide 7.9 (51)	Norwood Oval
Saturday, 21 July 1906	Sturt 3.13 (31)	def. by	North Adelaide 10.7 (67)	Unley Oval
	Bye; West Torrens

=== Round 12 ===
	Round 12
Saturday, 28 July 1906	South Adelaide 6.1 (37)	def.	North Adelaide 4.2 (26)	Adelaide Oval
Saturday, 28 July 1906	Port Adelaide 10.7 (67)	def.	West Adelaide 1.6 (12)	Alberton Oval
Saturday, 28 July 1906	West Torrens 7.7 (49)	def. by	Sturt 7.9 (51)	Hindmarsh Oval
	Bye; Norwood

=== Round 13 ===
	Round 13
Saturday, 4 August 1906	South Adelaide 4.11 (35)	drew with	West Torrens 5.5 (35)	Adelaide Oval
Saturday, 4 August 1906	Sturt 5.6 (36)	def. by	Norwood 11.13 (79)	Unley Oval
Saturday, 4 August 1906	Port Adelaide 10.9 (69)	def.	North Adelaide 7.8 (50)	Alberton Oval
	Bye; West Adelaide
The Unley match – with Sturt needing a win to be absolutely sure of their first finals berth – was marred by violent fighting, although no player was reported.

=== Round 14 ===
	Round 14
Saturday, 18 August 1906	South Adelaide 5.7 (37)	def. by	Port Adelaide 8.10 (58)	Adelaide Oval
Saturday, 18 August 1906	Norwood 11.17 (83)	def.	West Adelaide 3.10 (28)	Norwood Oval
Saturday, 18 August 1906	West Torrens 5.10 (40)	def. by	North Adelaide 12.13 (85)	Hindmarsh Oval
	Bye; Sturt

== Ladder ==
1906 SAFA Ladder
Pos	Team	Pld	W	L	D	PF	PA	PP	Pts
1	Port Adelaide (P)	12	11	1	0	902	424	68.02	22
2	Norwood	12	11	1	0	759	442	63.20	22
3	North Adelaide	12	6	6	0	637	508	55.63	12
4	Sturt	12	5	6	1	532	662	44.56	11
5	South Adelaide	12	4	6	2	568	535	51.50	10
6	West Torrens	12	3	8	1	547	753	42.08	7
7	West Adelaide	12	0	12	0	362	983	26.91	0

Rules for classification: 1) points; 2) percentage; 3) number of points for.
(P) Premiers

== Major round ==
=== First semi-final ===
1906 SAFA first semi-final
Saturday, 1 September 1906	Port Adelaide	def. by	North Adelaide	Adelaide Oval
0.4 (4); 0.8 (8); 0.9 (9); 0.12 (12)	Q1; Q2; Q3; Final	2.0 (12); 2.0 (12); 4.2 (26); 5.4 (34)
Goals	Earl 2, Daly 2, Johns
Dickson, Fraser, Pope, Fletcher, Selby, Beard, Corston, Earle	Best	McKenzie (best on ground), Ewers, H. Pash, Earl, C. Drew. Gurr, Nottage, N. Pash

=== Second semi-final ===
1906 SAFA second semi-final
Monday, 3 September 1906	Norwood	def.	Sturt	Adelaide Oval (crowd: 11,000)
3.1 (19); 5.2 (32); 9.6 (60); 10.10 (70)	Q1; Q2; Q3; Final	0.2 (2); 1.5 (11); 1.6 (12); 2.10 (22)
L. Hill 5, Townsend 2, Gwynne, L. Lewis, Robinson	Goals	Hay, Pudney
Townsend (best on ground), L. Hill, Barnes, Gwynne, Lewis, Bahr, Morrison, Newland	Best	N. Cameron, Wave, Hewitt, Halsam, Warhurst, Gurr, Kelch, G.G. Sharp

=== Final ===
1906 SAFA Final
Saturday, 8 September 1906	Norwood	def. by	North Adelaide	Adelaide Oval (crowd: 12,000)
1.0 (6); 2.3 (15); 4.4 (28); 5.4 (34)	Q1; Q2; Q3; Final	5.2 (32); 5.3 (33); 6.5 (41); 10.7 (67)
E. Lewis 2, Townsend 2, W. Miller	Goals	Daly 5, Jessop, Rees, Johns, Young, Stevenson
Barnes, Padman, Gwynne, Townsend, Bahr, Stoddart, Newland, E. Lewis	Best	Jessop (best on ground), T. McKenzie, Rees, Daly, N. Pash, Matthews, Stevenson

=== Challenge final ===
1906 SAFA Challenge Final
Saturday, 15 September 1906	Port Adelaide	def.	North Adelaide	Adelaide Oval (crowd: 20,000)
1.3 (9); 6.8 (44); 7.8 (50); 8.12 (60)	Q1; Q2; Q3; Final	1.2 (8); 2.2 (14); 5.7 (37); 5.9 (39)
Quinn 2, Davies 2, Strawns 2, Mathieson 2	Goals	Earl, Jessop, Daly, Nottage, Stevenson
Dickson, Davies, Pope, Cock, Beare, James, Earle, Soar, Dempster, Strawns	Best	T. McKenzie, Stevenson, H. Pash, Ewers, Nottage, Jessop, F. Sugg, V. Drew
