= 1895 SAFA season =

1895 SAFA premiership season
- Teams: 5
- Premiers: South Adelaide; 5th premiership
- Leading goalkicker: Anthony Daly; Norwood (46 goals)
- Matches played: 40

The 1895 South Australian Football Association season was the 19th season of the top-level Australian rules football competition in South Australia.

== Teams ==
Senior Clubs for 1895 Season
Natives	North Adelaide	Norwood	Port Adelaide	South Adelaide

In March 1895, a new club called Natives applied to join as the 5th Senior Club. It was formed from players from various districts and had the support of a group of former Port Adelaide players from a junior club called Port Natives {formed in 1893} who were the premiers of the Adelaide and Suburban Association. After initially having their application refused at a SAFA meeting on the 5th April 1895 the Natives then submitted a list of 50 players to show their strength. They were then admitted by 13 votes to 5 against. The name "Natives" was adopted so as to prevent any feeling that it was confined to any given locality. The club adopted new colours of Blue with a Gold hoop. This new senior club would rename itself and be called West Torrens in 1897 with the introduction of the Electoral System.

== Ladder ==
A summary of the 1895 season, including Tables of Games won, goal and behinds scored by each club vs each other club, top goal kickers, and a list of 1st and 2nd places since 1877 was published in the SA Register.

1895 SAFA Ladder
	TEAM	P	W	L	D	GF	BF	GA	BA	Pts
1	South Adelaide (P)	16	15	1	0	121	161	41	77	28
2	Norwood	16	11	4	1	113	114	61	103	23
3	Port Adelaide	16	8	7	1	94	148	76	98	17
4	North Adelaide	16	3	13	0	47	68	133	136	6
5	Natives	16	2	14	0	39	87	103	164	4
Key: P = Played, W = Won, L = Lost, D = Drawn, GF = Goals For, BF = Behinds For, GA = Goals Against, BA = Behinds Against, (P) = Premiers										

Notes: Each club played every other club 4 times. North Adelaide forfeited one match against both South Adelaide and Norwood
