= 1908 SAFL season =

1908 South Australian Football League

1908 SAFL premiership season
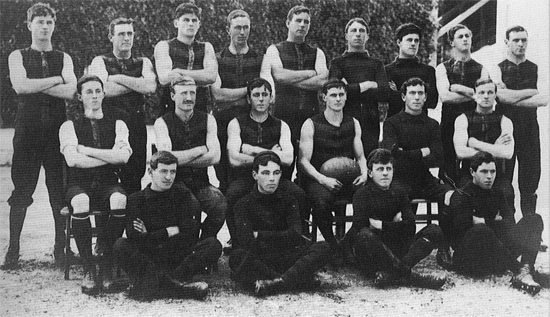
- 32nd season Pictured above is the 1908 West Adelaide premiership team.
- Teams: 7
- Premiers: West Adelaide; 1st premiership
- Minor premiers: Norwood; 4th minor premiership
- Magarey Medallist: James Tierney; West Adelaide
- Leading goalkicker: J Mathieson; Port Adelaide (33 goals)
- Matches played: 46
- Highest: 25,000 (Round 5, Port Adelaide vs. Norwood)

The 1908 South Australian Football League season was the 32nd season of the top-level Australian rules football competition in South Australia.

The feature of the season was the rise of West Adelaide. In their first eleven seasons in the SAFA/SAFL, West Adelaide had won just twenty of 127 games, including two winless seasons in 1898 and 1906. Following a major country recruiting campaign over the summer, bolstered by recruiting as its first coach former South Adelaide star Dinny Reedman, West Adelaide lost only two matches for the season, winning their first SAFL premiership and then their first Championship of Australia against Carlton.

== Minor round ==
=== Round 1 ===
	Round 1
Saturday, 2 May 1908	North Adelaide 3.10 (28)	def. by	West Adelaide 5.6 (36)	Adelaide Oval
Saturday, 2 May 1908	Port Adelaide 5.8 (38)	def.	West Torrens 2.4 (16)	Alberton Oval
Saturday, 2 May 1908	Norwood 10.12 (72)	def. by	South Adelaide 4.10 (34)	Norwood Oval
	Bye; Sturt

=== Round 2 ===
	Round 2
Saturday, 9 May 1908	North Adelaide 6.6 (42)	def. by	Norwood 7.10 (52)	Adelaide Oval
Saturday, 9 May 1908	Port Adelaide 15.11 (101)	def.	West Adelaide 1.7 (13)	Alberton Oval
Saturday, 9 May 1908	Sturt 4.10 (34)	def. by	South Adelaide 10.14 (74)	Unley Oval
	Bye; West Torrens
Eventual premiers West Adelaide scored only 1.7 (13) in its heavy loss against Port Adelaide, a record which stood as the lowest score in the club's history until 2021.

=== Round 3 ===
	Round 3
Saturday, 16 May 1908	South Adelaide 11.6 (72)	def.	North Adelaide 9.9 63	Adelaide Oval
Saturday, 16 May 1908	West Torrens 5.8 (38)	def. by	Norwood 14.20 (104)	Hindmarsh Oval
Saturday, 16 May 1908	Sturt 4.5 (29)	def. by	Port Adelaide 10.17 (77)	Unley Oval
	Bye; West Adelaide

=== Round 4 ===
	Round 4
Saturday, 23 May 1908	North Adelaide 13.12 (90	def.	Sturt 4.5 (29)	Adelaide Oval
Saturday, 23 May 1908	West Torrens 10.8 (68)	def.	South Adelaide 5.18 (48)	Hindmarsh Oval
Saturday, 23 May 1908	Norwood 4.7 (31)	def. by	West Adelaide 5.11 (41)	Norwood Oval
	Bye; Port Adelaide

=== Round 5 ===
	Round 5
Saturday, 30 May 1908	South Adelaide 8.10 (58)	def. by	Port Adelaide 9.7 (61)	Adelaide Oval
Saturday, 30 May 1908	Norwood 13.13 (91)	def.	Sturt 4.9 (33)	Norwood Oval
Saturday, 30 May 1908	West Torrens 6.9 (45)	def. by	West Adelaide 8.11 (59)	Hindmarsh Oval
	Bye; North Adelaide

=== Round 6 ===
	Round 6
Saturday, 6 June 1908	North Adelaide 5.9 (39)	def.	West Torrens 5.6 (36)	Adelaide Oval
Saturday, 6 June 1908	Sturt 3.8 (26)	def. by	West Adelaide 5.9 (39)	Unley Oval
Monday, 8 June 1908	Norwood 4.15 (39)	def.	Port Adelaide 3.9 (27)	Adelaide Oval (crowd: 25,000)
	Bye; South Adelaide

=== Round 7 ===
	Round 7
Saturday, 13 June 1908	North Adelaide 10.11 (71)	def.	Port Adelaide 4.9 (33)	Adelaide Oval
Saturday, 13 June 1908	West Adelaide 13.20 (98)	def.	South Adelaide 5.4 (34)	Jubilee Oval
Saturday, 13 June 1908	West Torrens 7.12 (54)	def.	Sturt 6.11 (47)	Hindmarsh Oval
	Bye; Norwood

=== Round 8 ===
	Round 8
Saturday, 27 June 1908	West Adelaide 15.13 (103)	def.	North Adelaide 6.11 (47)	Jubilee Oval
Saturday, 27 June 1908	Norwood 8.9 (57)	def.	South Adelaide 6.10 (46)	Norwood Oval
Saturday, 27 June 1908	West Torrens 6.11 (47)	def. by	Port Adelaide 16.14 (110)	Hindmarsh Oval
	Bye; Sturt

=== Round 9 ===
	Round 9
Saturday, 4 July 1908	West Adelaide 5.9 (39)	def.	Port Adelaide 5.3 (33)	Adelaide Oval
Saturday, 4 July 1908	Norwood 9.16 (70)	drew with	North Adelaide 10.10 (70)	Norwood Oval
Saturday, 4 July 1908	South Adelaide 12.15 (87)	def.	Sturt 6.5 (41)	Jubilee Oval
	Bye; West Torrens

=== Round 10 ===
	Round 10
Saturday, 11 July 1908	South Adelaide 4.9 (33)	def. by	North Adelaide 8.7 (55)	Adelaide Oval
Saturday, 11 July 1908	Port Adelaide 9.14 (68)	def.	Sturt 4.5 (29)	Alberton Oval
Saturday, 11 July 1908	Norwood 5.16 (46)	def.	West Torrens 2.14 (26)	Norwood Oval
	Bye; West Adelaide

=== Round 11 ===
	Round 11
Saturday, 18 July 1908	South Adelaide 11.12 (78)	def. by	West Torrens 12.11 (83)	Jubilee Oval
Saturday, 18 July 1908	Norwood 10.16 (76)	def.	West Adelaide 4.8 (32)	Norwood Oval
Saturday, 18 July 1908	Sturt 8.3 (51)	def. by	North Adelaide 7.18 (60)	Unley Oval
	Bye; Port Adelaide

=== Round 12 ===
	Round 12
Saturday, 25 July 1908	West Adelaide 7.11 (53)	def.	West Torrens 4.7 (31)	Adelaide Oval
Saturday, 25 July 1908	Port Adelaide 9.16 (70)	def.	South Adelaide 9.11 (65)	Alberton Oval
Saturday, 25 July 1908	Sturt 8.9 (57)	def. by	Norwood 13.11 (89)	Unley Oval
	Bye; North Adelaide

=== Round 13 ===
	Round 13
Saturday, 1 August 1908	West Adelaide 14.13 (97)	def.	Sturt 6.5 (41)	Adelaide Oval
Saturday, 1 August 1908	West Torrens 9.15 (69)	def. by	North Adelaide 12.13 (85)	Hindmarsh Oval
Saturday, 1 August 1908	Norwood 10.11 (71)	def.	Port Adelaide 7.8 (50)	Norwood Oval
	Bye; South Adelaide

=== Round 14 ===
	Round 14
Saturday, 15 August 1908	South Adelaide 4.12 (36)	def. by	West Adelaide 10.6 (66)	Adelaide Oval
Saturday, 15 August 1908	Port Adelaide 6.12 (48)	def.	North Adelaide 6.9 (45)	Alberton Oval
Saturday, 15 August 1908	Sturt 4.8 (32)	def. by	West Torrens 14.8 (92)	Unley Oval
	Bye; Norwood

== Ladder ==
1908 SAFL Ladder
Pos	Team	Pld	W	L	D	PF	PA	PP	Pts
1	Norwood	12	10	1	1	792	498	61.40	21
2	West Adelaide (P)	12	10	2	0	676	529	56.10	20
3	Port Adelaide	12	8	4	0	716	522	57.84	16
4	North Adelaide	12	6	5	1	697	632	52.45	13
5	West Torrens	12	4	8	0	605	739	45.01	8
6	South Adelaide	12	3	9	0	665	768	46.41	6
7	Sturt	12	0	12	0	449	912	32.99	0

Rules for classification: 1) points; 2) percentage; 3) number of points for.
(P) Premiers

== Major round ==
=== First semi-final ===
1908 SAFL first semi-final
Saturday, 5 September 1908	West Adelaide	def.	North Adelaide	Adelaide Oval (crowd: 10,000)
5.5 (35); 6.6 (42); 8.12 (60); 8.13 (61)	Q1; Q2; Q3; Final	0.1 (1); 3.4 (22); 4.6 (30); 6.10 (46)	Umpires: H. Reynolds
Moy 2, Dowling 2, Head, T. Leahy, Bruce, J.J. McCarthy	Goals	Jessop 3, C. Drew, Neville, Johns
Dowling, B. Leahy, Tierney, J. F. McCarthy, Head, Moore	Best	Gehrs, Johns, Jenkins, Pash, Neville

=== Second semi-final ===
1908 SAFL second semi-final
Saturday, 12 September 1908	Norwood	def.	Port Adelaide	Adelaide Oval (crowd: 20,000)
4.3 (27); 7.7 (49); 9.10 (64); 11.12 (78)	Q1; Q2; Q3; Final	1.0 (6); 4.2 (26); 6.3 (39); 6.4 (40)	Umpires: P. Kneebone
L. Chamberlain 4, Townsend 2, Gibbons 2, McGavisk, Bahr, Miller	Goals	Mathieson 2, Strawns 2, Turner, Dickson
H. Miller, Barnes, Bahr, Lionel Hill, Gwynne, McGavisk, Gibbons	Best	Pope, Cock, Davis, Turner, Strawns

=== Final ===
1908 SAFL final
Saturday, 19 September 1908	Norwood	def. by	West Adelaide	Adelaide Oval (crowd: 22,000)
2.0 (12); 2.1 (13); 2.4 (16); 3.6 (24)	Q1; Q2; Q3; Final	1.3 (9); 3.7 (25); 3.10 (28); 6.15 (51)	Umpires: P. Kneebone
L. Hill 2, Gibbons	Goals	W. Price 2, P. Bruce, Dowling, Tierney, Moy
H. M. Miller. W.R. Miller, Rooms, Townsend, J. Chamberlain, L. Hill	Best	Tierney, T. Leahy, B. Leahy, P. Bruce. W. Price, Horgan

=== Challenge final ===
1908 SAFL challenge final
Saturday, 25 September 1908	Norwood	def. by	West Adelaide	Adelaide Oval (crowd: 22,000)
3.7 (25); 4.7 (31); 5.9 (39); 6.13 (49)	Q1; Q2; Q3; Final	0.0 (0); 3.4 (22); 4.4 (28); 7.10 (52)	Umpires: P. Kneebone
J. Chamberlain 3, L. Chamberlain, Gibbons, Plunkett	Goals	Moy 4, P. Bruce 2, Price
Robin, H. Miller, Gwynne, Hill, Bahr, J. Chamberlain, W. Miller	Best	P. Bruce, T. Leahy, Tierney, Horgan, Stephens, J. Bruce, B. Leahy

== Championship of Australia ==
1908 Championship of Australia
Saturday, 3 October 1908	West Adelaide	def.	Carlton	Adelaide Oval (crowd: 13,000)
2.2 (14); 7.4 (46); 9.5 (59); 12.9 (81)	Q1; Q2; Q3; Final	2.1 (13); 3.2 (20); 7.7 (49); 7.10 (52)
J.F. McCarthy 5, W. Dowling 2, W. Price 2, J. Daly, T. Leahy, T. Moore	Goals	Gardiner 2, Elliott 2, Flynn, McGregor, Kelly
W. Dowling (best on ground), Bruce, T. Leahy, Tierney, J.F McCarthy, Horgan, B. Leahy, Head, Price	Best	Marchbanks, Elliott, Gotz, Flynn, Lang, Hammond, Jinks
