= 1904 SAFA season =

1904 SAFA premiership season
- Teams: 7
- Premiers: Norwood; 13th premiership
- Minor premiers: Port Adelaide; 4th minor premiership
- Magarey Medallist: Not awarded
- Leading goalkicker: William Miller; North Adelaide (54 Goals)
- Matches played: 46
- Highest: 11,000 (Grand Final, Norwood vs. Port Adelaide)

The 1904 South Australian Football Association season was the 28th season of the top-level Australian rules football competition in South Australia.

== Ladder ==
1904 SAFA Ladder
Pos	Team	Pld	W	L	D	PF	PA	PP	Pts
1	Port Adelaide	12	10	1	1	657	380	63.36	21
2	Norwood (P)	12	9	2	1	903	465	66.01	19
3	South Adelaide	12	7	5	0	669	615	52.10	14
4	North Adelaide	12	7	5	0	665	626	51.51	14
5	Sturt	12	6	6	0	417	471	46.96	12
6	West Torrens	12	1	11	0	450	667	40.29	2
7	West Adelaide	12	1	11	0	340	877	27.94	2

Rules for classification: 1) points; 2) percentage; 3) number of points for.
(P) Premiers

== Finals series ==
=== Grand Final ===
1904 SAFA Grand Final

Saturday, 17 September (2:10 pm)	Norwood 9.8 (62)	def.	Port Adelaide 8.10 (58)	Jubilee Oval (crowd: 15,000)
