= 1950 SANFL season =

- Teams: 8
- Premiers: Norwood; 22nd premiership
- Minor premiers: Norwood; 14th minor premiership
- Magarey Medallist: Ian McKay; North Adelaide
- Ken Farmer Medallist: Colin Churchett; Glenelg (105 Goals)

Attendance
- Matches played: 72
- Total attendance: 686,735 (9,538 per match)
- Highest: 50,389 (Grand Final, Norwood vs. Glenelg)

The 1950 South Australian National Football League season was the 71st season of the top-level Australian rules football competition in South Australia.

== Ladder ==
1950 SANFL Ladder
Pos	Team	Pld	W	L	D	PF	PA	PP	Pts
1	Norwood (P)	17	13	4	0	1967	1271	60.75	26
2	Glenelg	17	12	5	0	1610	1401	53.47	24
3	Port Adelaide	17	12	5	0	1462	1266	53.59	24
4	West Torrens	17	11	6	0	1713	1314	56.59	22
5	North Adelaide	17	9	8	0	1577	1244	55.90	18
6	West Adelaide	17	9	8	0	1440	1332	51.95	18
7	Sturt	17	2	15	0	1173	1902	38.15	4
8	South Adelaide	17	0	17	0	998	2174	31.46	0

Rules for classification: 1) points; 2) percentage; 3) number of points for.
(P) Premiers

== Finals Series ==
=== Grand Final ===
1950 SANFL Grand Final
Saturday 30 September (2:10 pm)	Norwood	def.	Glenelg	Adelaide Oval (crowd: 50,389)	Report
7.5 (47); 8.6 (54); 12.9 (81); 15.16 (106)	Q1; Q2; Q3; Final	2.2 (14); 5.5 (35); 6.7 (43); 8.11 (59)
