= 1934 SANFL season =

- Teams: 8
- Premiers: Glenelg; 1st premiership
- Minor premiers: Port Adelaide; 16th minor premiership
- Magarey Medallist: George Johnston; Glenelg (46 votes)
- Ken Farmer Medallist: Ken Farmer; North Adelaide (106 Goals)
- Matches played: 72
- Highest: 30,045 (Grand Final, Glenelg vs. Port Adelaide)

The 1934 South Australian National Football League season was the 55th season of the top-level Australian rules football competition in South Australia.

== Ladder ==
1934 SANFL Ladder
Pos	Team	Pld	W	L	D	PF	PA	PP	Pts
1	Port Adelaide	17	10	6	1	1916	1581	54.79	21
2	Glenelg (P)	17	10	6	1	1818	1704	51.62	21
3	West Torrens	17	10	7	0	1550	1509	50.67	20
4	Sturt	17	10	7	0	1624	1583	50.64	20
5	North Adelaide	17	9	7	1	1855	1605	53.61	19
6	West Adelaide	17	8	8	1	1755	1727	50.40	17
7	Norwood	17	5	12	0	1612	1920	45.64	10
8	South Adelaide	17	4	13	0	1626	2127	43.33	8

Rules for classification: 1) points; 2) percentage; 3) number of points for.
(P) Premiers

== Finals series ==
=== Grand Final ===
1934 SANFL Grand Final
Saturday, 6 October	Glenelg	def.	Port Adelaide	Adelaide Oval (crowd: 30,045)
5.4 (34); 10.8 (68); 15.10 (100); 18.15 (123)	Q1; Q2; Q3; Final	3.4 (22); 6.13 (49); 11.17 (83); 16.18 (114)
