= 1894 SAFA season =

South Australian Football Association season

1894 SAFA premiership season
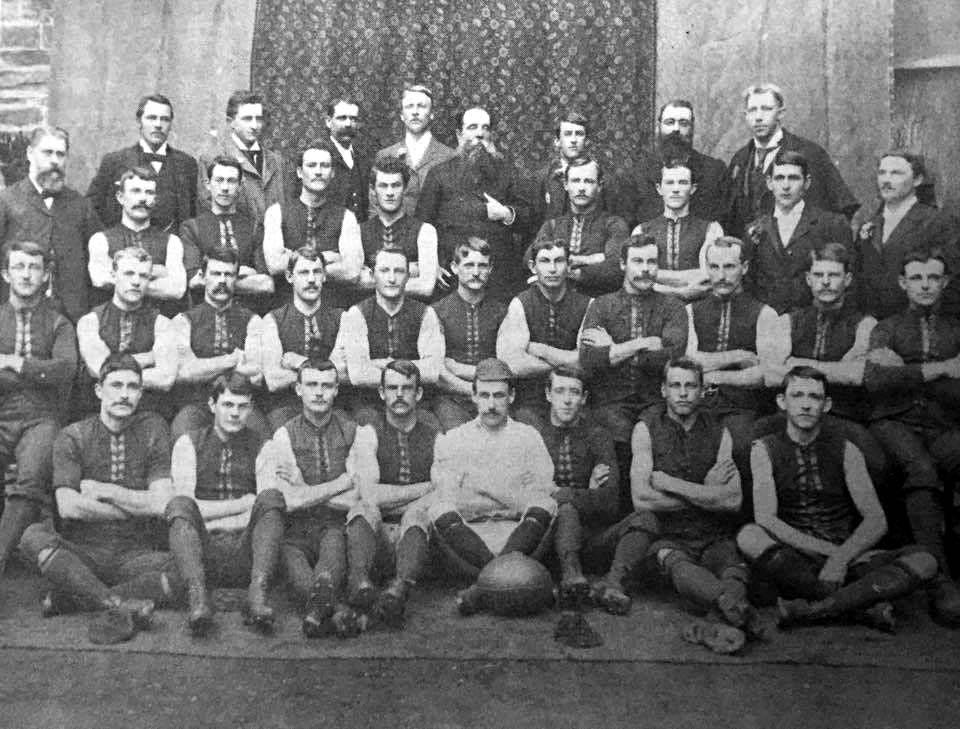
- Norwood, premiers
- Teams: 4
- Premiers: Norwood; 11th premiership
- Minor premiers: South Adelaide 1st Round; Norwood 2nd Round
- Leading goalkicker: Anthony Daly; Norwood (47 goals)
- Matches played: 38
- Highest: 9,000 (Grand Final Replay, Norwood v. South Adelaide)

The 1894 South Australian Football Association season was the 18th season of the top-level Australian rules football competition in South Australia. Norwood in their 17th season won their 11th Premiership.

The season was divided into two rounds, with the winner of each round playing in a premiership play-off match. After a drawn playoff between the two round winners, Norwood defeated South Adelaide 4 goals to 3 in the replay. This was the second instance of the Premiership decided by a playoff following the first in 1889 when Norwood and Port Adelaide both tied on identical points.

== Adelaide Football Club resigns from SAFA ==
The Adelaide Football Club, Premiers in 1886, and who joined the SAFA in 1885 after a merger of North Adelaide Juniors and North Park from the Adelaide and Suburban Association, resigned from the SAFA before the commencement of the 1894 season and folded.

At a meeting of the committee of the SAFA on Monday, 9 March 1894, it was reported Mr. B. Shepley (Secretary of the Adelaide Football Club) wrote giving notice that his club wished to retire from the Association. The club regretted the circumstance and wished the Association every success.

For the 1893 season, Adelaide had merged with the Eastbourne Football Club, 1891 and 1892 Premiers of the City and Suburban Association. The Eastbourne Football Club on 18 April 1894 applied for readmission to the City and Suburban Association and were accepted.

The Adelaide Club has no relationship to the modern day Adelaide Crows formed in 1990.

== Season Programme ==
The programme as drawn up by the sub committee and adopted by the committee was as follows:—
1st Round
May 5, Norwood v. Port (Adelaide), South v. North Adelaide (Kensington):
May 12, South v. Port (Adelaide), Norwood v. North Adelaide (Kensington);
May 19, Norwood v. South (Adelaide), Port v. North Adelaide (Alberton);
May 24 (holiday), South v. Port (Adelaide);
May 26, Norwood v. North Adelaide (Adelaide);
June 2, Norwood v. South (Adelaide), Port v. North Adelaide (Alberton);
June 9, Norwood v. Port (Adelaide), South v. North Adelaide (Kensington);
June 16, South v. Port (Adelaide);
June 20 (holiday), Norwood v. Port (Adelaide);
June 23, South v. North Adelaide (Adelaide);
June 30, Norwood v. South (Adelaide), Port v. North Adelaide (Kensington);

2nd Round
July 7, South v. Port (Adelaide), Norwood v. North Adelaide (Kensington);
July 14, Norwood v. Port (Adelaide), South v. North Adelaide (Kensington);
July 21, Yorke'a Peninsula v. a combined team picked by the Association (Adelaide);
July 28, Port v. North Adelaide (Adelaide);
August 4, Norwood v. South (Adelaide), Port v. North Adelaide (Kensington);
August 11, Norwood v. North Adelaide (Adelaide);
August 18, North v. South (Adelaide);
August 25, South v. Port (Adelaide), Norwood v. North Adelaide (Kensington);
September 1 (holiday), Norwood v. South (Adelaide);
September 8, Norwood v. Port (Adelaide), South v. North Adelaide (Kensington);
September 15, South v. Port (Adelaide), Norwood v. North Adelaide (Kensington);
September 22, Norwood v. South (Adelaide), Port v. North Adelaide (Alberton);
September 29, Norwood v. Port (Adelaide), South v. North Adelaide (Kensington).

=== 1894 SAFA 1st Round Winner Playoff Football Match ===
As South Adelaide and Norwood finished in a tie for first place in the first round, a play-off match was required: the clubs arranged for the play-off to take place on August 11.
The match originally fixed for that day, Norwood vs North Adelaide, was moved to the following Saturday at Kensington; North Adelaide were granted £10 as compensation for losing an Adelaide Oval fixture.

1st Round Premiership Playoff
Saturday 11 August (afternoon)	South Adelaide	def.	Norwood	Adelaide Oval
1.8 (1); 2.10 (2); 3.13 (3); 5.15 (5)	Q1; Q2; Q3; Final	0.0 (0); 0.3 (0); 0.5 (0); 3.7 (3)

== Ladders (Minor Round) ==
1894 SAFA Ladder - First Round (Final Table after Playoff)
	TEAM	P	W	L	D	GF	BF	GA	BA	Pts
1	South Adelaide (W)	10	8	2	0	79	108	45	66	16
2	Norwood	10	7	3	0	84	87	45	73	14
3	Port Adelaide	9	3	6	0	44	71	49	71	6
4	North Adelaide	9	1	8	0	21	41	89	97	2
Key: P = Played, W = Won, L = Lost, D = Drawn, GF = Goals For, BF = Behinds For, GA = Goals Against, BA = Behinds Against, (W) = Winner

1894 SAFA Ladder - Second Round
	TEAM	P	W	L	D	GF	BF	GA	BA	Pts
1	Norwood (W)	9	7	2	0	52	67	35	42	14
2	Port Adelaide	9	6	3	0	49	66	41	42	12
3	South Adelaide	9	5	4	0	49	71	38	67	10
4	North Adelaide	9	0	9	0	16	33	52	86	0
Key: P = Played, W = Won, L = Lost, D = Drawn, GF = Goals For, BF = Behinds For, GA = Goals Against, BA = Behinds Against, (W) = Winner; Notes: North Adelaide forfeited two games, one each against Norwood and Port Adelaide.										

== Premiership Playoff final ==
=== 1894 SAFA Premiership Football Match ===
Grand Final
Saturday 6 October (3:00 pm)	Norwood	drew with	South Adelaide	Adelaide Oval
0.0 (0); 1.3 (1); 2.4 (2); 4.8 (4)	Q1; Q2; Q3; Final	1.5 (1); 1.5 (1); 3.8 (3); 4.8 (4)
Despite a provision for 20 minute periods of extra time, the match was abandoned after full time due to darkness; the result stood, and a replay was ordered.

=== 1894 SAFA Premiership Football Match Replay ===
Grand Final Replay
Wednesday 10 October (2:00 pm)	Norwood	def.	South Adelaide	Adelaide Oval (crowd: 9,000)
1.1 (1); 2.4 (2); 2.5 (2); 4.7 (4)	Q1; Q2; Q3; Final	2.4 (2); 2.4 (2); 3.5 (3); 3.5 (3)
