= 1947 SANFL season =

- Teams: 8
- Premiers: West Adelaide; 6th premiership
- Minor premiers: Norwood; 12th minor premiership
- Magarey Medallist: Bob Hank; West Torrens (26 votes)
- Ken Farmer Medallist: Bob McLean; Port Adelaide (80 goals)
- Matches played: 72
- Highest: 32,631 (Grand Final, West Adelaide vs. Norwood)

The 1947 South Australian National Football League season was the 68th season of the top-level Australian rules football competition in South Australia.

== Ladder ==
1947 SANFL Ladder
Pos	Team	Pld	W	L	D	PF	PA	PP	Pts
1	Norwood	17	15	2	0	1916	1402	57.75	30
2	Port Adelaide	17	14	3	0	1642	1252	56.74	28
3	Sturt	17	10	7	0	1638	1438	53.25	20
4	West Adelaide (P)	17	10	7	0	1733	1523	53.22	20
5	West Torrens	17	9	8	0	1448	1432	50.28	18
6	North Adelaide	17	5	12	0	1481	1717	46.31	10
7	Glenelg	17	3	14	0	1427	1877	43.19	6
8	South Adelaide	17	2	15	0	1277	1921	39.93	4

Rules for classification: 1) points; 2) percentage; 3) number of points for.
(P) Premiers

== Finals series ==
=== Grand Final ===
1947 SANFL Grand Final
Saturday, 4 October	West Adelaide	def.	Norwood	Adelaide Oval (crowd: 32,631)
2.5 (17); 5.6 (36); 7.12 (54); 10.15 (75)	Q1; Q2; Q3; Final	0.4 (4); 2.10 (22); 4.12 (36); 5.15 (45)
