= 1969 SANFL season =

- Teams: 10
- Premiers: Sturt; 9th premiership
- Minor premiers: Glenelg; 1st minor premiership
- Magarey Medallist: Fred Phillis; Glenelg
- Ken Farmer Medallist: Fred Phillis; Glenelg (137 Goals)

Attendance
- Matches played: 105
- Total attendance: 1,036,943 (9,876 per match)
- Highest: 55,600 (Grand Final, Sturt vs. Glenelg)

The 1969 South Australian National Football League season was the 90th season of the top-level Australian rules football competition in South Australia.

== Ladder ==
1969 SANFL Ladder
Pos	Team	Pld	W	L	D	PF	PA	PP	Pts
1	Glenelg	20	17	3	0	2499	1422	63.73	34
2	Sturt (P)	20	15	5	0	2242	1564	58.91	30
3	West Adelaide	20	15	5	0	1792	1470	54.94	30
4	West Torrens	20	14	6	0	1969	1662	54.23	28
5	North Adelaide	20	13	7	0	1886	1651	53.32	26
6	Port Adelaide	20	9	11	0	1417	1534	48.02	18
7	Woodville	20	8	12	0	1675	1995	45.64	16
8	Central District	20	4	16	0	1402	2162	39.34	8
9	Norwood	20	3	17	0	1751	2326	42.95	6
10	South Adelaide	20	2	18	0	1376	2223	38.23	4

Rules for classification: 1) points; 2) percentage; 3) number of points for.
(P) Premiers

== Finals Series ==
=== Grand Final ===
1969 SANFL Grand Final
Saturday, 4 October (2:10 pm)	Sturt	def.	Glenelg	Adelaide Oval (crowd: 55,600)
6.3 (39); 10.7 (67); 16.12 (108); 24.15 (159)	Q1; Q2; Q3; Final	2.3 (15); 5.10 (40); 8.13 (61); 13.16 (94)
