= 1935 SANFL season =

- Teams: 8
- Premiers: South Adelaide; 9th premiership
- Minor premiers: Port Adelaide; 17th minor premiership
- Magarey Medallist: Jack Cockburn; South Adelaide (42 votes)
- Ken Farmer Medallist: Ken Farmer; North Adelaide (128 Goals)
- Matches played: 72
- Highest: 26,496 (Grand Final, South Adelaide vs. Port Adelaide)

The 1935 South Australian National Football League season was the 56th season of the top-level Australian rules football competition in South Australia.

== Ladder ==
1935 SANFL Ladder
Pos	Team	Pld	W	L	D	PF	PA	PP	Pts
1	Port Adelaide	17	12	5	0	1837	1469	55.57	24
2	South Adelaide (P)	17	11	6	0	1898	1616	54.01	22
3	Norwood	17	11	6	0	1697	1640	50.85	22
4	Sturt	17	10	6	1	1775	1656	51.73	21
5	West Torrens	17	9	8	0	1537	1560	49.63	18
6	North Adelaide	17	8	8	1	1834	1697	51.94	17
7	West Adelaide	17	5	12	0	1506	1708	46.86	10
8	Glenelg	17	1	16	0	1381	2137	39.26	2

Rules for classification: 1) points; 2) percentage; 3) number of points for.
(P) Premiers

== Finals series ==
=== Grand Final ===
1935 SANFL Grand Final
Saturday, 5 October	South Adelaide	def.	Port Adelaide	Adelaide Oval (crowd: 26,496)
5.1 (31); 10.3 (63); 14.7 (91); 15.9 (99)	Q1; Q2; Q3; Final	2.3 (15); 8.4 (52); 10.8 (68); 13.13 (91)
