= 1938 SANFL season =

- Teams: 8
- Premiers: South Adelaide; 10th premiership
- Minor premiers: South Adelaide; 3rd minor premiership
- Magarey Medallist: Bob Quinn; Port Adelaide (32 votes)
- Ken Farmer Medallist: Ken Farmer; North Adelaide (112 Goals)
- Matches played: 72
- Highest: 33,364 (Grand Final, South Adelaide vs. Port Adelaide)

The 1938 South Australian National Football League season was the 59th season of the top-level Australian rules football competition in South Australia.

== Ladder ==
1938 SANFL Ladder
Pos	Team	Pld	W	L	D	PF	PA	PP	Pts
1	South Adelaide (P)	17	15	2	0	2244	1553	59.10	30
2	Norwood	17	13	4	0	1871	1486	55.73	26
3	Port Adelaide	17	10	7	0	1865	1577	54.18	20
4	West Torrens	17	10	7	0	1732	1576	52.36	20
5	North Adelaide	17	8	9	0	1633	1847	46.93	16
6	Sturt	17	5	12	0	1494	1695	46.85	10
7	West Adelaide	17	4	13	0	1527	2025	42.99	8
8	Glenelg	17	3	14	0	1562	2169	41.87	6

Rules for classification: 1) points; 2) percentage; 3) number of points for.
(P) Premiers

== Finals series ==
=== Grand Final ===
1938 SANFL Grand Final
Saturday, 1 October	South Adelaide	def.	Port Adelaide	Adelaide Oval (crowd: 33,364)
6.3 (39); 9.5 (59); 21.9 (135); 23.14 (152)	Q1; Q2; Q3; Final	4.3 (27); 9.5 (59); 11.8 (74); 15.16 (106)
