= 1937 SANFL season =

- Teams: 8
- Premiers: Port Adelaide; 12th premiership
- Minor premiers: Norwood; 9th minor premiership
- Magarey Medallist: Harold Hawke; North Adelaide (37 votes)
- Ken Farmer Medallist: Ken Farmer; North Adelaide (108 Goals)
- Matches played: 72
- Highest: 35,895 (Grand Final, Port Adelaide vs. South Adelaide)

The 1937 South Australian National Football League season was the 58th season of the top-level Australian rules football competition in South Australia.

== Ladder ==
1937 SANFL Ladder
Pos	Team	Pld	W	L	D	PF	PA	PP	Pts
1	Norwood	17	13	4	0	2011	1449	58.12	26
2	Port Adelaide (P)	17	13	4	0	1954	1497	56.62	26
3	South Adelaide	17	11	6	0	1667	1452	53.45	22
4	West Torrens	17	10	7	0	1506	1444	51.05	20
5	North Adelaide	17	7	8	2	1725	1761	49.48	16
6	Sturt	17	5	11	1	1528	1706	47.25	11
7	West Adelaide	17	4	13	0	1366	1822	42.85	8
8	Glenelg	17	3	13	1	1600	2226	41.82	7

Rules for classification: 1) points; 2) percentage; 3) number of points for.
(P) Premiers

== Finals series ==
=== Grand Final ===
1937 SANFL Grand Final
Saturday, 2 October	Port Adelaide	def.	South Adelaide	Adelaide Oval (crowd: 35,895)
3.6 (24); 5.7 (37); 8.10 (52); 13.16 (94)	Q1; Q2; Q3; Final	0.3 (3); 3.12 (30); 6.13 (49); 9.16 (70)
