= 1961 SANFL season =

- Teams: 10
- Premiers: West Adelaide; 7th premiership
- Minor premiers: Port Adelaide; 30th minor premiership
- Magarey Medallist: John Halbert; Sturt
- Ken Farmer Medallist: Geoff Kingston; West Adelaide (79 Goals)

Attendance
- Matches played: 80
- Total attendance: 859,336 (10,742 per match)
- Highest: 40,409 (Grand Final, West Adelaide vs. Norwood)

The 1961 South Australian National Football League season was the 82nd season of the top-level Australian rules football competition in South Australia.

== Ladder ==
1961 SANFL Ladder
Pos	Team	Pld	W	L	D	PF	PA	PP	Pts
1	Port Adelaide	19	15	4	0	1638	1161	58.52	30
2	West Adelaide (P)	19	14	5	0	1827	1287	58.67	28
3	West Torrens	19	14	5	0	1782	1410	55.83	28
4	Norwood	19	11	8	0	1611	1382	53.83	22
5	North Adelaide	19	10	9	0	1537	1465	51.20	20
6	South Adelaide	19	5	14	0	1250	1970	38.82	10
7	Glenelg	19	4	15	0	1481	1996	42.59	8
8	Sturt	19	3	16	0	1330	1785	42.70	6

Rules for classification: 1) points; 2) percentage; 3) number of points for.
(P) Premiers

== Finals Series ==
=== Grand Final ===
1961 SANFL Grand Final
Saturday, 30 September (2:10 pm)	West Adelaide	def.	Norwood	Adelaide Oval (crowd: 40,409)
3.2 (20); 9.5 (59); 12.8 (80); 16.13 (109)	Q1; Q2; Q3; Final	4.5 (29); 7.6 (48); 9.7 (61); 11.7 (73)
