= 1903 SAFA season =

1903 SAFA premiership season
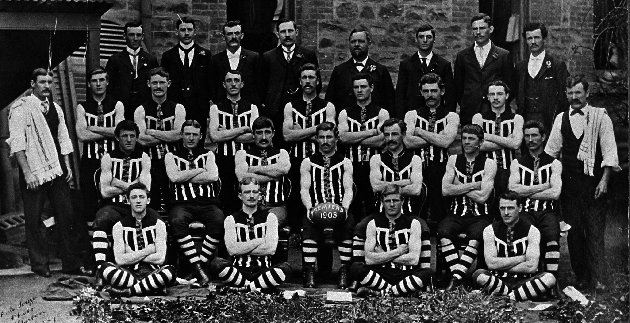
- 27th season Pictured above is the 1903 Port Adelaide premiership team.
- Teams: 7
- Premiers: Port Adelaide; 4th premiership
- Minor premiers: Port Adelaide; 3rd minor premiership
- Magarey Medallist: Hendrick Waye; Sturt
- Leading goalkicker: Anthony Daly; North Adelaide (54 Goals)
- Matches played: 46
- Highest: 14,000 (Grand Final, Port Adelaide vs. North Adelaide)

The 1903 South Australian Football Association season was the 27th season of the top-level Australian rules football competition in South Australia.

== Ladder ==
1903 SAFA Ladder
Pos	Team	Pld	W	L	D	PF	PA	PP	Pts
1	Port Adelaide (P)	12	10	1	1	801	323	71.26	21
2	North Adelaide	12	10	2	0	858	428	66.72	20
3	Norwood	12	8	4	0	573	382	60.00	16
4	South Adelaide	12	4	6	2	521	527	49.71	10
5	West Torrens	12	3	9	0	421	696	37.69	6
6	West Adelaide	12	3	9	0	350	905	27.89	6
7	Sturt	12	2	9	1	320	583	35.44	5

Rules for classification: 1) points; 2) percentage; 3) number of points for.
(P) Premiers

== Finals series ==
=== Grand final ===
	1903 SAFA Grand Final
Saturday, 12 September (2:10 pm)	Port Adelaide 6.6 (42)	v	South Adelaide 5.5 (35)	Adelaide Oval (crowd: 14,000)
