= 1973 SANFL season =

- Teams: 10
- Premiers: Glenelg; 2nd premiership
- Minor premiers: Glenelg; 2nd minor premiership
- Magarey Medallist: Barrie Robran; North Adelaide
- Ken Farmer Medallist: Ken Whelan; Sturt (107 Goals)

Attendance
- Matches played: 111
- Total attendance: 1,131,287 (10,192 per match)
- Highest: 56,525 (Grand Final, Glenelg vs. North Adelaide)

The 1973 South Australian National Football League season was the 94th season of the top-level Australian rules football competition in South Australia.

After a 39 year absence of any silverware, Glenelg were the dominant team of the season, recording only a single loss to North Adelaide in Round 7. They stormed home to a narrow grand final victory against the same club after Graham Cornes kicked a famous goal late in the game.

The Final Five System was introduced which involves an additional week of final games. In Round 21 of the Minor Round Norwood defeated Port Adelaide and North Adelaide defeated Central Districts. The result being that Norwood qualified in 5th Place over Central District on percentage. Norwood (5th) then defeated Port Adelaide (4th) in the Elimination Final, whilst Sturt (2nd) defeated North Adelaide (3rd) by 6pts. Glenelg the Minor Premiers received a Bye in this first week of the Finals and progress straight to the 2nd Semi Final.

The season was more famous for the disappearance of two children from a game between Norwood and North Adelaide.

== Ladder ==
1973 SANFL Ladder
Pos	Team	Pld	W	L	D	PF	PA	PP	Pts
1	Glenelg (P)	21	20	1	0	2847	1857	60.52	40
2	Sturt	21	17	4	0	2534	1612	61.12	34
3	North Adelaide	21	16	5	0	2230	1945	53.41	32
4	Port Adelaide	21	11	10	0	2191	2087	51.22	22
5	Norwood	21	10	11	0	2194	1987	52.48	20
6	Central District	21	10	11	0	2076	2084	49.90	20
7	West Torrens	21	9	12	0	1967	2153	47.74	18
8	Woodville	21	4	16	1	2024	2589	43.88	9
9	South Adelaide	21	4	17	0	1734	2840	37.91	8
10	West Adelaide	21	3	17	1	1780	2423	42.35	7

Rules for classification: 1) points; 2) percentage; 3) number of points for.
(P) Premiers

== Finals Series ==
=== Grand Final ===
1973 SANFL Grand Final
Saturday, 29 September (2:10 pm)	Glenelg	def.	North Adelaide	Adelaide Oval (crowd: 56,525)
4.3 (27); 9.10 (64); 16.10 (106); 21.11 (137)	Q1; Q2; Q3; Final	7.6 (48); 8.10 (58); 14.14 (98); 19.16 (130)
