= 1905 SAFA season =

1905 SAFA premiership season
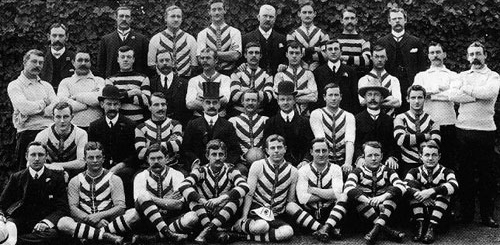
- 29th SAFA season North Adelaide premiership team.
- Teams: 7
- Premiers: North Adelaide; 3rd premiership
- Minor premiers: North Adelaide; 2nd minor premiership
- Magarey Medallist: Tom MacKenzie; North Adelaide
- Leading goalkicker: James Mathieson; Port Adelaide (30 goals); Anthony Daly; North Adelaide (30 goals)
- Matches played: 45
- Highest: 11,000 (Grand Final, North Adelaide vs. Port Adelaide)

The 1905 South Australian Football Association season was the 29th season of the top-level Australian rules football competition in South Australia. North Adelaide won their 3rd premiership when they defeated Port Adelaide by 44 to 12 pts in the Grand Final.

== Ladder ==
1905 SAFA Ladder
Pos	Team	Pld	W	L	D	PF	PA	PP	Pts
1	North Adelaide (P)	12	10	1	1	661	337	66.23	21
2	Port Adelaide	12	9	3	0	678	398	63.01	18
3	Norwood	12	8	4	0	697	469	59.78	16
4	South Adelaide	12	5	6	1	502	532	48.55	11
5	Sturt	12	4	8	0	482	570	45.82	8
6	West Torrens	12	4	8	0	417	633	39.71	8
7	West Adelaide	12	1	11	0	333	831	28.61	2

Rules for classification: 1) points; 2) percentage; 3) number of points for.
(P) Premiers

== Finals Series ==
=== Finals ===
	1905 SAFA Grand Final
Saturday, 9 September (2:10 pm)	North Adelaide 6.8 (44)	def.	Port Adelaide 1.6 (12)	Adelaide Oval (crowd: 12,000)
Port Adelaide's score is the lowest in a SANFL Grand Final. They managed only a single goal in the first quarter and remained goalless for the final three quarters of the match.
