= Rex Johns =

Australian rules footballer

- Rex Johns at Adelaide Oval during the 1950s.

Personal information
- Full name: Rex Harold Johns
- Nickname: Rexie / Sexy Rexie Johns
- Born: 21 May 1935
- Died: 17 December 2009 (aged 74); Adelaide
- Height: 184.5 cm (6 ft 1 in)
- Weight: 80 kg (176 lb)
- Position: Forward

Playing career^{1}
Years	Club	Games (Goals)
1954–1963	Port Adelaide	134 (451)

Representative team honours
Years	Team	Games (Goals)
1957, 1960	South Australia	5 (17)
- ^{1} Playing statistics correct to the end of 1963.

Career highlights
- 4x Port Adelaide premiership player (1956, 1957, 1958, 1962); 6x Port Adelaide leading goal-kicker (1956, 1957, 1958, 1961, 1962, 1963); 4x SANFL leading goal-kicker (1956, 1958, 1962, 1963)

Rex Harold Johns (21 May 1935 – 17 December 2009) was an Australian rules footballer for the Port Adelaide Football Club in the South Australian National Football League (SANFL).

== Football career ==
During an era of dour defence, Johns' ability to score goals at an average 3.37 per game was exceptional. During his time at the club he won the club's leading goalkicker award six times and the competition's award four times. He was a member of four premiership teams for Port Adelaide.

== Personal life ==
After his football career, in his early 30’s, he coached U12 football at Fulham Football Club and successfully coached winning premiership teams, defeating Henley in the 1967 Grand Final by one point. He was very popular with his young players. Rex Johns died after a valiant battle with cancer on the 16 December 2009 at the age of 74.

== Reputation ==
Rex Johns was the childhood idol of Malcolm Blight.
