= 1952 SANFL season =

- Teams: 8
- Premiers: North Adelaide; 8th premiership
- Minor premiers: North Adelaide; 7th minor premiership
- Magarey Medallist: Len Fitzgerald; Sturt (25 votes)
- Ken Farmer Medallist: John Willis; West Torrens (85 Goals)

Attendance
- Matches played: 72
- Total attendance: 724,460 (10,062 per match)
- Highest: 50,105 (Grand Final, North Adelaide vs. Norwood)

The 1952 South Australian National Football League season was the 73rd season of the top-level Australian rules football competition in South Australia.

== Minor Round ==
=== Round 1 ===
	Round 1
Friday, 25 April (2:10pm)	Port Adelaide 11.12 (88)	def.	Glenelg 7.3 (45)	Adelaide Oval (crowd: 27,000)
Saturday, 26 April (2:10pm)	West Adelaide 15.12 (102)	def.	South Adelaide 7.10 (52)	Kensington Oval (crowd: 2,000)
Saturday, 26 April (2:10pm)	West Torrens 17.4 (106)	def.	North Adelaide 11.18 (84)	Thebarton Oval (crowd: 9,500)
Saturday, 26 April (2:10pm)	Sturt 9.11 (65)	def. by	Norwood 23.13 (151)	Unley Oval (crowd: 9,500)

== Ladder ==
1952 SANFL Ladder
Pos	Team	Pld	W	L	D	PF	PA	PP	Pts
1	North Adelaide (P)	17	14	3	0	1525	1179	56.40	28
2	Port Adelaide	17	13	4	0	1423	957	59.79	26
3	West Torrens	17	11	6	0	1622	1316	55.21	22
4	Norwood	17	10	7	0	1519	1340	53.13	20
5	Glenelg	17	6	11	0	1387	1460	48.72	12
6	West Adelaide	17	6	11	0	1161	1304	47.10	12
7	South Adelaide	17	5	12	0	1093	1652	39.82	10
8	Sturt	17	3	14	0	1156	1678	40.79	6

Rules for classification: 1) points; 2) percentage; 3) number of points for.
(P) Premiers

== Finals ==
=== Grand Final ===
1952 SANFL Grand Final
Saturday 4 October (2:10 pm)	North Adelaide	def.	Norwood	Adelaide Oval (crowd: 50,105)	Report
3.1 (19); 11.3 (64); 17.10 (112); 23.15 (153)	Q1; Q2; Q3; Final	2.0 (12); 3.4 (22); 5.5 (35); 6.9 (45)
