= 1929 SANFL season =

- Teams: 8
- Premiers: Norwood; 18th premiership
- Minor premiers: Norwood; 8th minor premiership
- Magarey Medallist: Robert Snell; West Adelaide
- Ken Farmer Medallist: Les Dayman; Port Adelaide (86 Goals)
- Matches played: 72
- Highest: 35,504 (Grand Final, Norwood vs. Port Adelaide)

The 1929 South Australian National Football League season was the 50th season of the top-level Australian rules football competition in South Australia.

== Ladder ==
1929 SANFL Ladder
Pos	Team	Pld	W	L	D	PF	PA	PP	Pts
1	Norwood (P)	17	13	3	1	1521	1160	56.73	27
2	Port Adelaide	17	13	4	0	1568	1004	60.96	26
3	West Adelaide	17	10	7	0	1313	1282	50.60	20
4	West Torrens	17	9	8	0	1352	1276	51.45	18
5	North Adelaide	17	8	8	1	1328	1367	49.28	17
6	Sturt	17	6	11	0	1238	1435	46.32	12
7	Glenelg	17	5	12	0	1275	1572	44.78	10
8	South Adelaide	17	3	14	0	1257	1756	41.72	6

Rules for classification: 1) points; 2) percentage; 3) number of points for.
(P) Premiers

== Finals series ==
=== Grand Final ===
1929 SANFL Grand Final
Saturday, 5 October	Norwood	def.	Port Adelaide	Adelaide Oval (crowd: 35,504)
4.5 (29); 7.9 (51); 9.11 (65); 16.14 (110)	Q1; Q2; Q3; Final	2.2 (14); 2.7 (19); 6.9 (45); 10.9 (69)
