= John Cahill Medal =

Annual award in Australian football

- Sport: Australian rules football
- Competition: Australian Football League
- Awarded for: Best and fairest performance across an AFL season
- Location: Alberton Oval, Adelaide
- Presented by: Port Adelaide Football Club

History
- First award: 1870
- Editions: 149
- First winner: John Wald
- Most wins: Russell Ebert – 6
- Most recent: Jason Horne-Francis

The John Cahill Medal is an Australian rules football award presented annually to the player(s) adjudged the best and fairest at the Port Adelaide Football Club throughout the Australian Football League (AFL) season. The Port Adelaide Football Club was established in 1870 and became a founding member of the South Australian Football Association (SAFA), later known as the South Australian National Football League (SANFL), in 1877. The club joined the AFL in 1997, and holds the unique status of being the only pre-existing non-Victorian club to have entered the AFL from another league.

A best and fairest award has been awarded by the club since 1870, with the winners of the award appearing on the club's honour board. Prior to the club's entry to the AFL, the award was known as the Port Adelaide Best and Fairest. After the club's entry to the AFL the award was renamed in honour of John Cahill, who coached or played in 14 premierships in the South Australian National Football League (SANFL) and was the club's inaugural AFL coach.

The inaugural winner of the club's best and fairest award was John Wald in 1870, and the inaugural winner of the AFL best and fairest was Darren Mead in 1997. Russell Ebert has the record for most best and fairest wins, winning on six occasions in 1971, 1972, 1974, 1976, 1977 and 1981, whilst Kane Cornes and Warren Tredrea hold the record for most John Cahill Medals won, both with four. There have been four players to win the award three consecutive times; Thomas Smith (1877–1879), Harry Phillips (1891–1893), Robbie Gray (2014–2016) and Zak Butters (2023–2025).

As of 2025, the voting system for the medal is handled by a panel of three coaching staff members. For each match, the senior coach, club's general manager, and respective line coach each award players between 0 and 5 votes based on their performances, with a maximum of 15 votes attainable.. The club changed to this voting system in 2013, with minor tweaks in 2019 and 2023 to adjust how many coaches award votes. It has previously changed the best and fairest voting system in 2011 and 1997.

== Recipients ==
Section Legend
^	Denotes current player
+	Player won Magarey Medal in same season
#	Player won Brownlow Medal in same season
✪	Player won Ken Farmer Medal in same season
(2)	Repeat winner of award

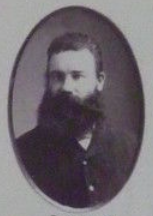
Thomas Smith was the club's first multi-time winner of the best and fairest award.

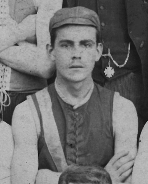
Stan Malin was the first player to win a league best and fairest and club best and fairest in the same year.

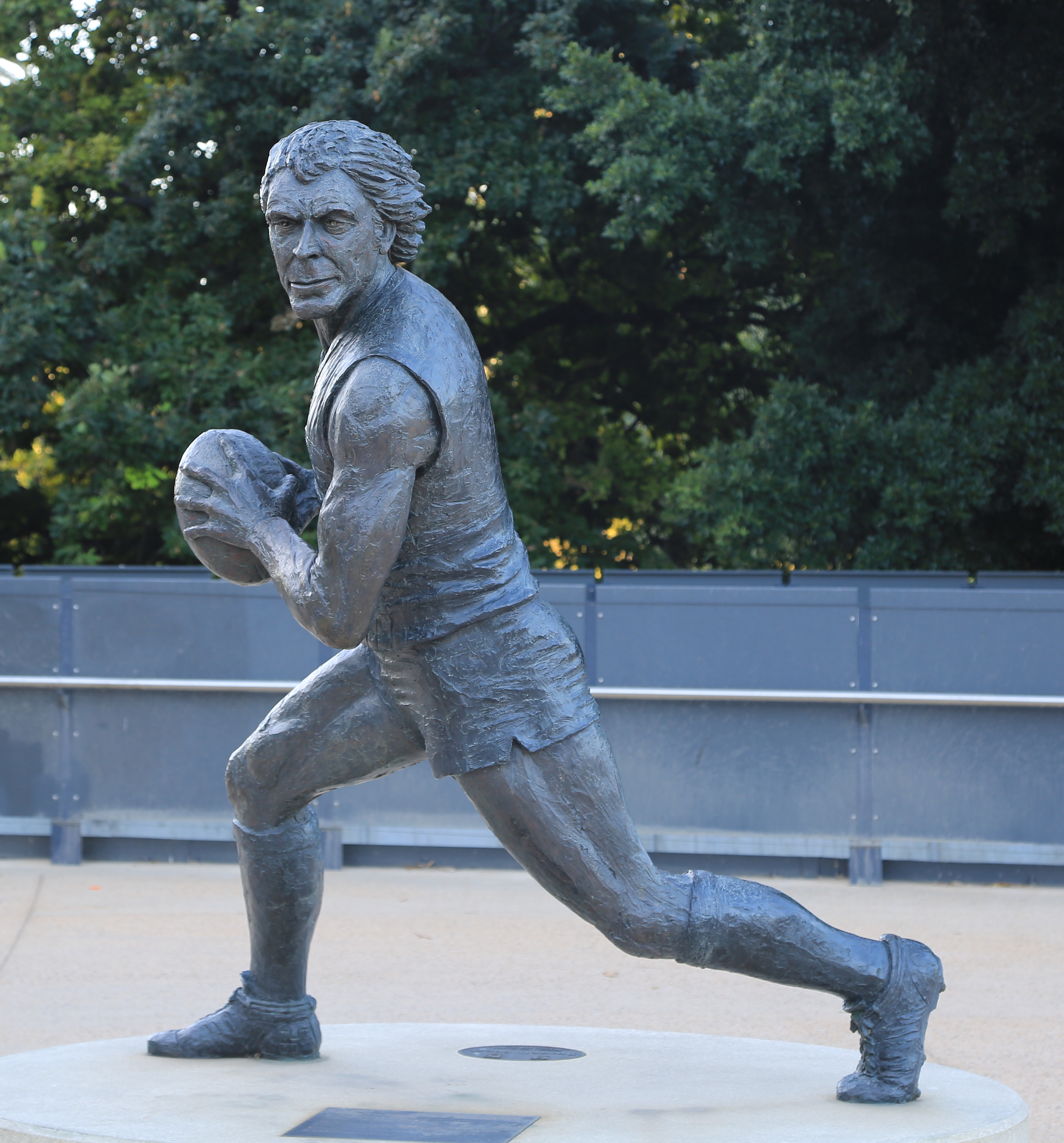
A statue of Russell Ebert located outside of Adelaide Oval. Ebert holds the club record for most best and fairest awards won, with six.

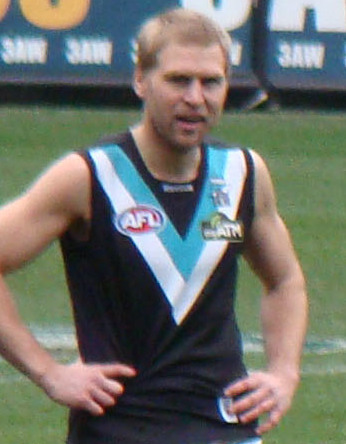
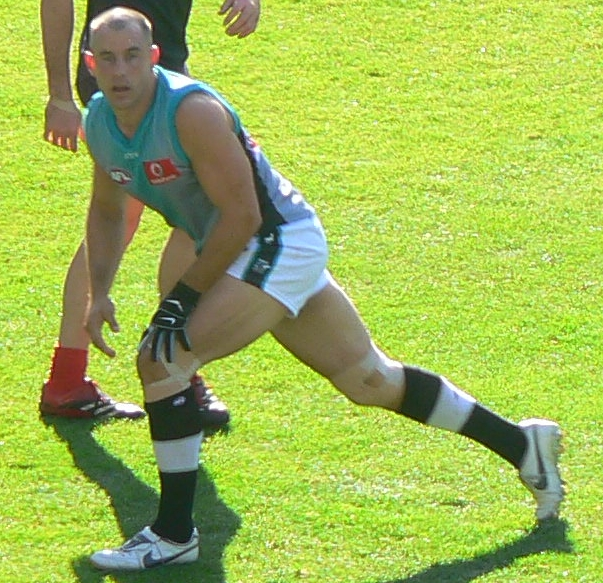
Kane Cornes and Warren Tredrea both hold the record for the most John Cahill Medals won, with four.

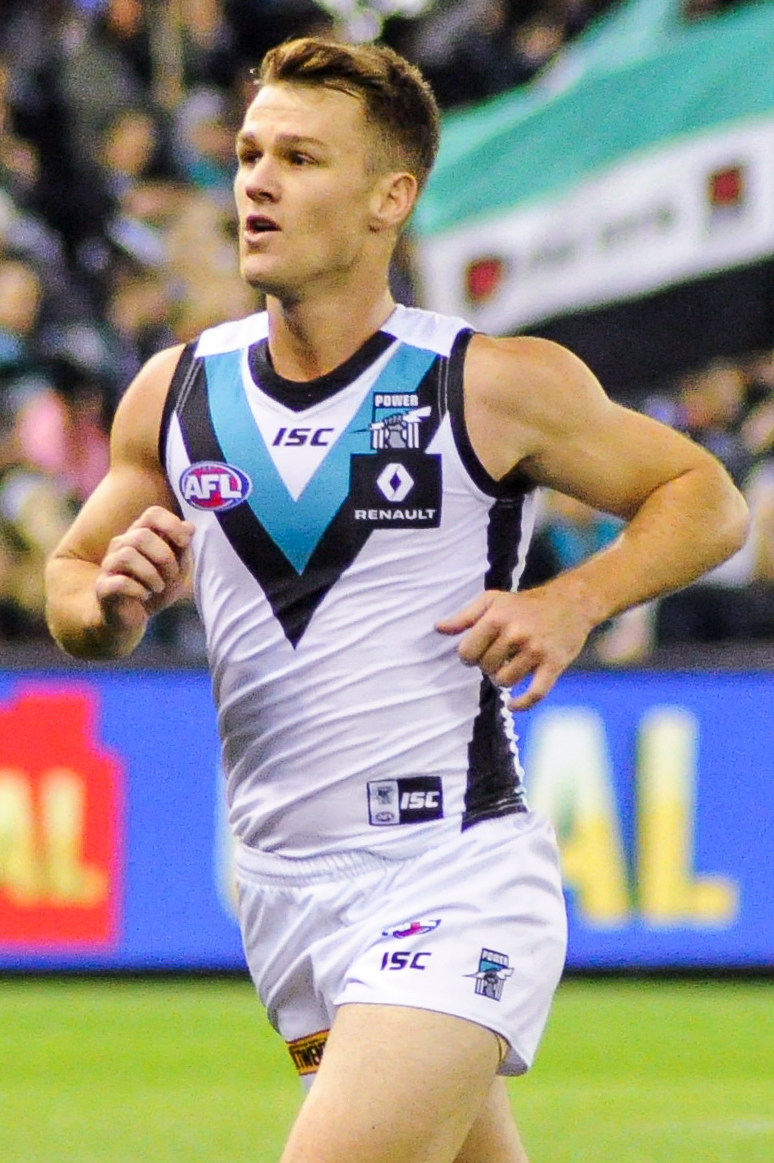
In 2015, Robbie Gray became the first player to win three consecutive best and fairest award since Harry Phillips in 1893.

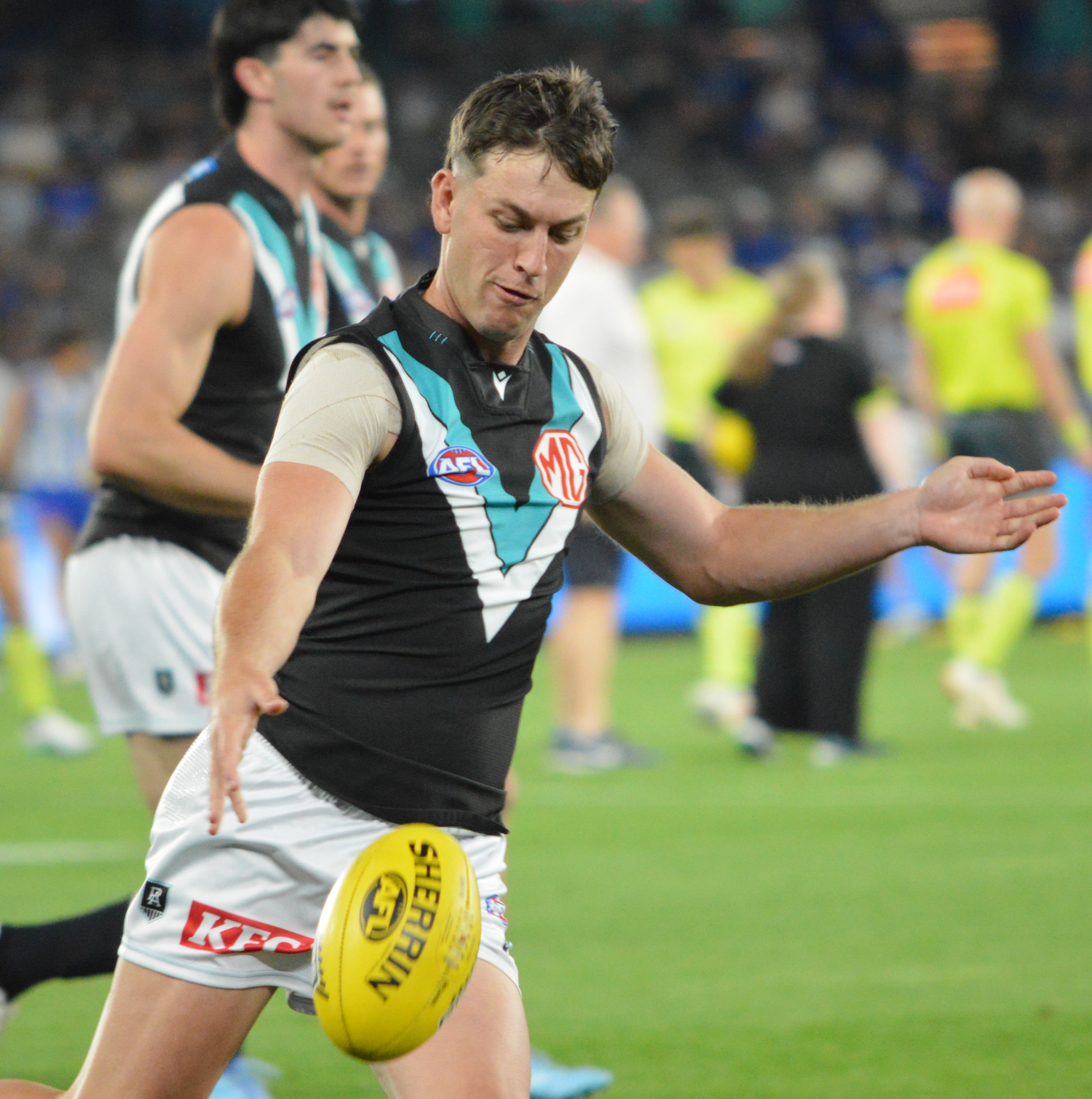
Zak Butters, winner of the 2025 John Cahill Medal

John Cahill Medal - Pre-AFL
Season	Best and fairest	Ref
1870	John Wald	—
1871	Fred Stone	—
1872	—N/a	—
1873	Samuel Tyzack	—
1874	—N/a	—
1875	Henry Ford	—
1876	Ernest LeMessurier	—
1877	Thomas Smith	—
1878	Thomas Smith (2)	—
1879	Thomas Smith (3)	—
1880	John Sidoli	—
1881	John Sidoli (2)	—
1882	James Munro	—
1883	Robert Kirkpatrick	—
1884	George Cairns	—
1884	Charles Kellett	—
1885	Michael Coffee	—
1886	Charlie Fry	—
1887	William Bushby	—
1887	Richard Walsh	—
1888	Harry Phillips	—
1889	Goody Hamilton	—
1890	Charlie Fry (2)	—
1891	Harry Phillips (2)	—
1892	Harry Phillips (3)	—
1893	Walter Murray	—
1893	Harry Phillips (4)	—
1894	Alf Miers	—
1895	Otway L'Estage	—
1896	George Linklater	—
1897	Ken McKenzie	—
1898	Archibald Hosie	—
1899	Stan Malin +	—
1900	John Quinn Sr.	—
1901	Ted Strawns	—
1902	Lewis Corston	—
1903	James Tompkins	—
1904	Lewis Corston (2)	—
1905	John Quinn Sr. (2)	—
1906	Ted Strawns (2)	—
1907	Jack Mack +	—
1908	Sinclair Dickson	—
1909	Sinclair Dickson (2)	—
1910	Sampson Hosking +	—
1911	Harold Oliver	—
1912	Harold Oliver (2)	—
1913	Harry Eaton	—
1914	Jack Ashley +	—
1915	Harry Eaton (2)	—
1916 (Note: The South Australian Football League was in recess from 1916 to 1918 due to World War I.)	—N/a	—
1917	—N/a	—
1918	—N/a	—
1919	Jack Ashley (2)	—
1920	Charlie Adams	—
1921	Charlie Adams + (2)	—
1922	Clem Dayman	—
1923	Les Dayman	—
1924	Les Dayman (2)	—
1925	Peter Bampton +	—
1926	Lawrence Hodge	—
1927	Clifford Keal	—
1928	Les Dayman (3)	—
1929	Ernest Mucklow	—
1930	Victor Johnson	—
1931	Maurice Allingham	—
1932	Ernest Mucklow (2)	—
1933	Jack Dermody	—
1934	Albert Hollingworth	—
1935	Jack Dermody (2)	—
1936	Albert Hollingworth (2)	—
1937	Bob Quinn	—
1938	Bob Quinn + (2)	—
1939	Allan Reval	—
1940	Reginald Schumann	—
1941	John Skelley	—
1942 (Note: The Port Adelaide Football Club was temporarily merged with West Torrens during the 1942, 1943 and 1944 SANFL seasons because of World War II.)	—N/a	—
1943	—N/a	—
1944	—N/a	—
1945	Bob Quinn + (3)	—
1946	Lew Roberts	—
1947	Bob Quinn (4)	—
1948	Dick Russell	—
1949	Dick Russell (2)	—
1950	Fos Williams	—
1951	Dick Russell (3)	—
1952	Ray Whitaker	—
1953	Harold McDonald	—
1954	Roger Clift	—
1955	Fos Williams (2)	—
1956	Edward Whelan	—
1957	Neville Hayes	—
1958	Geof Motley	—
1959	Geof Motley (2)	—
1960	Neville Hayes (2)	—
1961	Jeff Potter	—
1962	Peter Obst	—
1963	Geof Motley (3)	—
1964	Jeff Potter (2)	—
1965	Geof Motley (4)	—
1966	John Cahill	—
1967	Jeff Potter (3)	—
1968	John Cahill (2)	—
1969	Jeff Potter (4)	—
1970	John Cahill (3)	—
1971	Russell Ebert +	—
1972	Russell Ebert (2)	—
1973	John Cahill (4)	—
1974	Russell Ebert + (3)	—
1975	Peter Woite +	—
1976	Russell Ebert + (4)	—
1977	Russell Ebert (5)	—
1978	Stephen Clifford	—
1979	Milan Faletic	—
1980	Stephen Clifford (2)	—
1981	Russell Ebert (6)	—
1982	Craig Bradley	—
1983	Stephen Clifford (3)	—
1984	Craig Bradley (2)	—
1985	Craig Bradley (3)	—
1986	Martin Leslie	—
1987	Bruce Abernethy	—
1988	Greg Phillips	—
1989	Russell Johnston	—
1990	Scott Hodges + ✪	—
1991	Paul Northeast	—
1992	Nathan Buckley +	—
1993	Troy Bond	—
1994	Tim Ginever	—
1995	Robbie West	—
1996	Scott Hodges ✪ (2)	—

John Cahill Medal - AFL Era
Season	Best and fairest	Votes	Runner Up	Votes	Ref
1997	Darren Mead	—	Matthew Primus	—	
1998	Adam Kingsley	—	Donald Dickie	—	
1999	Stephen Paxman	—	Warren Tredrea	—	
2000	Brett Montgomery	—	Nick Stevens	—	
2001	Warren Tredrea	164	Josh Carr	159	
2002	Matthew Primus	150	Warren Tredrea (2)	145	
2003	Gavin Wanganeen	224	Warren Tredrea (3)	201	
2004	Warren Tredrea (2)	236	Kane Cornes	220	
2005	Warren Tredrea (3)	176	Kane Cornes (2)	173	
2006	Brendon Lade	157	Shaun Burgoyne	148	
2007	Kane Cornes	225	Chad Cornes	196	
2008	Kane Cornes (2)	135	Domenic Cassisi	115	
2009	Warren Tredrea (4)	103	Kane Cornes (3)	100	
2010	Kane Cornes (3)	134	Troy Chaplin	125	
2011	Travis Boak	13	Tom Logan	10	
2011	Jackson Trengove	13	Tom Logan	10	
2012	Kane Cornes (4)	18	Matthew Broadbent	16	
2012	Kane Cornes (4)	18	Brad Ebert	16	
2013	Chad Wingard	284	Travis Boak	266	
2014	Robbie Gray	398	Travis Boak (2)	255	
2015	Robbie Gray (2)	243	Chad Wingard	230	
2016	Robbie Gray (3)	230	Ollie Wines^	206	
2017	Paddy Ryder	241	Charlie Dixon	234	
2018	Justin Westhoff	179	Tom Jonas	162	
2018	Justin Westhoff	179	Ollie Wines^ (2)	162	
2019	Travis Boak (2)	179	Darcy Byrne-Jones^	168	
2020	Darcy Byrne-Jones^	159	Travis Boak (3)	136	
2021	Ollie Wines^#	229	Travis Boak (4)	167	
2022	Connor Rozee^	132	Travis Boak (5)	102	
2023	Zak Butters	190	Connor Rozee^	170	
2024	Zak Butters (2)	159	Jason Horne-Francis^	152	
2025	Zak Butters (3)	134	Mitch Georgiades^	118	
2026	Jason Horne-Francis^	88	Zak Butters	83	

== Multiple winners ==
^	Denotes current player

Recipients	Medals	Seasons
Russell Ebert	6	1971, 1972, 1974, 1976, 1977, 1981
John Cahill	4	1966, 1968, 1970, 1973
Kane Cornes	4	2007, 2008, 2010, 2012
Geof Motley	4	1958, 1959, 1963, 1965
Harry Phillips	4	1888, 1891, 1892, 1893
Jeff Potter	4	1961, 1964, 1967, 1969
Bob Quinn	4	1937, 1938, 1945, 1947
Warren Tredrea	4	2001, 2004, 2005, 2009
Zak Butters	3	2023, 2024, 2025
Craig Bradley	3	1982, 1984, 1985
Stephen Clifford	3	1978, 1980, 1983
Les Dayman	3	1923, 1924, 1928
Robbie Gray	3	2014, 2015, 2016
Dick Russell	3	1948, 1949, 1951
Thomas Smith	3	1877, 1888, 1889
Charlie Adams	2	1920, 1921
Jack Ashley	2	1914, 1919
Travis Boak	2	2011, 2019
Lewis Corston	2	1902, 1904
Jack Dermody	2	1933, 1935
Sinclair Dickson	2	1908, 1909
Harry Eaton	2	1913, 1915
Charlie Fry	2	1886, 1890
Neville Hayes	2	1957, 1960
Scott Hodges	2	1990, 1996
Albert Hollingworth	2	1934, 1936
Ernest Mucklow	2	1929, 1932
Harold Oliver	2	1911, 1912
John Quinn Sr.	2	1900, 1905
John Sidoli	2	1880, 1881
Ted Strawns	2	1901, 1906
Fos Williams	2	1950, 1955
