= List of Port Adelaide Football Club captains =

The following is a list of players who have captained the Port Adelaide Football Club at a game of Australian rules football in the Australian Football League (AFL) since 1997, the South Australian National Football League (SANFL) and earlier iterations of competition between 1870 and 1996, and the AFL Women's (AFLW) since 2022.

== History ==
Tradition dictates that the captain of the Port Adelaide Football Club wear the number one guernsey – this started when Clifford Keal wore the number as club captain for the first time in 1924. The tradition was cemented, at least in the view of then-secretary Charles Hayter, when in 1929 he received a letter from a junior Kilkenny player requesting a number one Port Adelaide guernsey as he had just become captain of his underage team. Hayter granted the wish of the junior and provided him with a number one Port Adelaide guernsey. Since 1924, there have been few exceptions to the tradition. The most notable exception was Geof Motley, who followed the captaincy of Fos Williams. Following his appointment as captain-coach, Motley elected to continue wearing the number 17, and continued to do so for the remainder of his career. When Motley handed the captaincy to John Cahill in 1967, at the insistence of coach Fos Williams, the tradition of Port Adelaide captains wearing the number one guernsey resumed. When co-captains were appointed for the 2019 season the No. 1 guernsey was temporarily retired, but it was re-instated the following season when the club returned to appointing a single captain.

== SANFL ==
	Foundation era
No	Year	Captain
1	1870	John Wald
2	1870	George Dale
3	1871	Fred Stone
4	1872–1873	George Middleton
5	1873	H.Sparnon
6	1874	John Rann
7	1874	Charles Wells
8	1875	Robert Sandilands
9	1876	William Fletcher
	South Australian Football Association era
	Year	Captain
	1877–1879	William Fletcher
10	1880	John A.Atkins
11	1880	Joseph Carter
	1881	William Fletcher
12	1881	J.H.Sandilands
13	1882	Nathaniel Frayne
14	1882	Charles Kellett
15	1883	Ernest Le Messurier
16	1883–1885	Richard Turpenny
	1885	Charles Kellett
17	1886–1889	William Bushby
18	1890–1894	Ken McKenzie
19	1895	Alfred Miers
	1896–1898	Ken McKenzie
20	1899–1900	Harold Phillips
21	1901–1904	Archibald Hosie
22	1904–1905	Jack Quinn
23	1906	Jack Fletcher
24	1906	Lewis Corston
	South Australian Football League era
	Year	Captain
	1907	Lewis Corston
25	1908	Ted Strawns
26	1908–1909	Mick Donaghy
27	1910	Jack Woollard
28	1911	George Dempster
29	1912	Clifford Cocks
30	1912	Sampson Hosking
31	1913–1914	Jack Londrigan
32	1915	Alexander McFarlane
	World War One
	1919	Alexander McFarlane
33	1919	Horrie Pope
34	1920	John W. Robertson
35	1920	Bert Olds
36	1921	Harold Oliver
37	1922	Samuel Howie
38	1923	Clement Dayman
39	1924–1925	Clifford Keal
40	1926	Maurice Allingham
	South Australian National Football League era
	Year	Captain
41	1927	Peter Bampton
42	1928–1931	Victor Johnson
43	1932–1933	Sydney Ween
	1934	Victor Johnson
44	1935	Robert Johnson
45	1936–1937	Jack Dermody
46	1938	Ned Hender
47	1939–1940	Robert Quinn
48	1940–1941	Allan Reval
	Patriotic League begins
49	1942–1944	Llewellyn Roberts
	Patriotic League ends
	1945–1947	Robert Quinn
50	1948	Llewellyn Roberts
51	1949	Reginald Schumann
52	1950–1958	Fos Williams
53	1959–1966	Geof Motley
54	1967–1973	John Cahill
55	1974–1978	Russell Ebert
56	1979–1982	Brian Cunningham
	1983–1985	Russell Ebert
57	1986–1990	Russell Johnston
58	1991–1993	Greg Phillips
59	1994–1996	Tim Ginever

== AFL ==
	Year	Captain
60	1997–2000	Gavin Wanganeen
61	2001–2005	Matthew Primus
62	2006–2008	Warren Tredrea
63	2009–2012	Domenic Cassisi
64	2013–2018	Travis Boak
65, 66	2019	Ollie Wines/Tom Jonas
66	2020–2023	Tom Jonas
67	2024–	Connor Rozee

== AFL Women's ==
	AFLW
No	Year	Captain
1	2022 (S7)–2023	Erin Phillips
2	2024	Janelle Cuthbertson
3	2025–	Justine Mules-Robinson
