= Charles Hayter (secretary) =

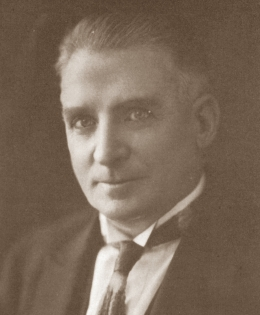
- Died: May 5, 1948; Royal Adelaide Hospital; Adelaide, South Australia
- Occupation: Secretary of the Port Adelaide Football Club (1927-1948)

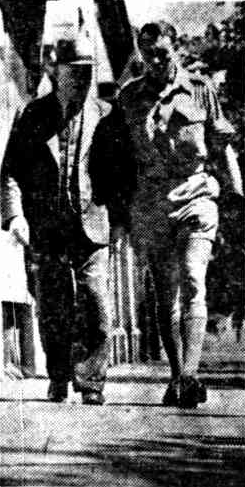
Charles Hayter in discussion with Haydn Bunton Sr. in 1945

Charles Hayter was an Australian football club manager and secretary for South Australia and the Port Adelaide Football Club from the 1920s to 1940s.

== Port Adelaide Football Club ==
Charles was elected Secretary of the Port Adelaide Football Club in 1922. He was awarded Life Membership of the club in 1937.

During his 22 years as secretary the team played in 14 grand finals and won 5 premierships, missing the finals once in 1933. During his time as secretary of Port Adelaide he also managed the South Australian representative team.

== Death and tributes ==
On 5 May 1948, Charles Hayter collapsed at a Largs Bay bus stop at 9pm. He was taken to the Royal Adelaide Hospital and died at midnight. Earlier that night, he told Port Adelaide captain Lew Roberts that he had never felt better.

His funeral was attended by more than 5,000 people who lined the streets. Port Adelaide players marched ahead of the hearse, led by captain Lew Roberts. Port Adelaide players and members of the Returned Serviceman's League acted as pallbearers.

He was described upon his death by the Barrier Miner newspaper of Broken Hill as "Australia's best known football personality". Thomas Hill, secretary of the South Australian National Football League, said of Charles "he was the greatest worker and kindest man the game has ever had. I never knew anybody who would go further out of his way to do a good turn".

== Legacy ==
On 5 June 1949, a Memorial Game between current and former Port Adelaide players was played in Charles' honour at the ICI Ground in Birkenhead. Notable players included former Port Adelaide and South Australian captains Jack Dermody and Ned Hender, along with Ken Obst, Allan "Bull" Reval, and triple Brownlow and Sandover Medalist Haydn Bunton Sr.

A memorial fund was set up to perpetuate Charles' memory. Jack Dermody donated £1/1. The Collingwood Football Club donated £5/5. Mr Welter Arnold, President of the Tasmanian Football League, donated £5. Norwood President Mr E Heidenreich donated £10.

In 1953, the Port Adelaide club rooms were re-fitted and named in Hayter's honour. The remodelling and extension of the clubrooms cost £1,600, but most of the work was carried out voluntarily. At the time, they gave Port Adelaide the "best headquarters appointments of all Clubs". They included "a committee room, first aid room, kitchen servery, property office, secretary's office and players change rooms with adequate locker space, five showers and a big plunge bath". Most of the decoration was in the Port Adelaide colours of black and white, and Charlie's name was engraved in glass, surrounding a magpie, the clubs' emblem.
