= 1889 SAFA Grand Final =

Australian rules football game

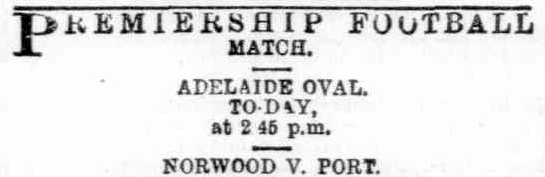
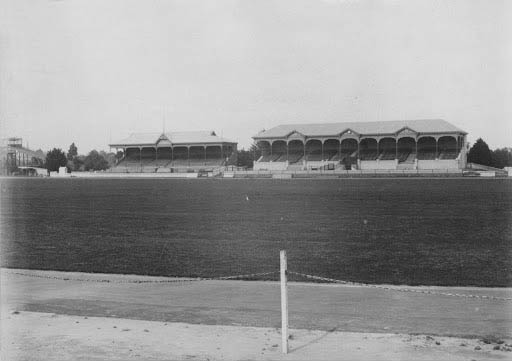
- Photo of the Adelaide Oval grandstands in 1889 by photographer Ernest Gall.

| Norwood | Port Adelaide |
|---|---|
| 7.4 | 5.9 |
| | 1 | 2 | 3 | 4 |
|---|---|---|---|---|
| NOR | 3.1 | 4.1 | 5.3 | 7.4 |
| PTA | 3.1 | 3.3 | 4.7 | 5.9 |
- Date: Saturday 5 October (2:45 pm)
- Stadium: Adelaide Oval
- Attendance: 7,227 tickets sold (11,000 estimated as season ticket holders entered free)
- Favourite: Norwood
- Umpires: Field umpire: John Trait; Goal umpires: I.A. Fisher and J. McKenzie
- Coin toss won by: Norwood
- Kicked toward: Scoreboard End

Accolades
- Best on Ground: Alfred Waldron (field umpire's choice)
- Australian Football Hall of Fame: John Daly (1996)

The 1889 SAFA Grand Final was an Australian rules football game contested between the Norwood and Port Adelaide, held at the Adelaide Oval on the 5 October 1889. The match is recognised as "the first-ever grand final in Australian football". The game resulted in a victory for Norwood, who beat Port Adelaide by two goals, marking the club's ninth premiership and third in a row.

Norwood's captain, Alfred Waldron, was considered the best player on the ground by field umpire John Trait. The match was attended by an estimated 11,000 people.

== Background ==
The match was required after Port Adelaide and Norwood had ended with an identical win–loss–draw record at the conclusion of the regular 1889 SAFA season. Port Adelaide's two losses both were at the hands of Norwood. Meanwhile, Norwood's losses were one game to Port Adelaide and another to Adelaide. In Round 14, both clubs played the only draw of the 1889 SAFA season.

Although the term "Grand Final" was not in wide use until 1931, and finals series were not introduced until 1897, the term "Grand Final" is also used to denote any pre-1897 premiership playoff match that was required in order to break a tie on head-to-head records or premiership points or settle a dispute between teams, and also where the last match of the home-and-away season determined the winners and runners-up for the season.

As such, this match between Norwood and Port Adelaide was the first-ever fixture in the SAFA's history to decide the premiership.

=== 1889 SAFA Ladder ===
1889 SAFA Ladder
| | TEAM | P | W | L | D | GF | BF | GA | BA | Pts | Adj Pts |
| 1 | Norwood | 17 | 14 | 2 | 1 | 102 | 165 | 30 | 75 | 29 | 29 |
| 1 | Port Adelaide | 17 | 14 | 2 | 1 | 127 | 177 | 33 | 63 | 29 | 29 |
| 3 | Adelaide | 17 | 8 | 9 | 0 | 57 | 95 | 78 | 161 | 16 | 16 |
| 4 | Gawler | 11 | 4 | 7 | 0 | 21 | 65 | 76 | 104 | 8 | 12.36 |
| 5 | South Adelaide | 17 | 6 | 11 | 0 | 54 | 132 | 71 | 120 | 12 | 12 |
| 6 | Medindie | 15 | 0 | 15 | 0 | 19 | 56 | 90 | 158 | 0 | 0 |
| Key: P = Played, W = Won, L = Lost, D = Drawn, GF = Goals For, BF = Behinds For, GA = Goals Against, BA = Behinds Against, Pts = Points, Adj Pts = Points adjusted for match ratio | | | | | | | | | | | |

=== John Trait ===
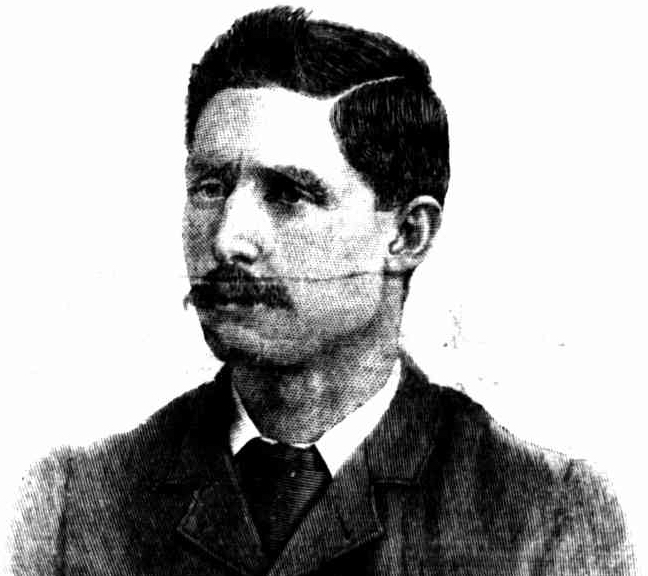
John Trait was sought out as umpire for the match by the SAFA. At the time he was unanimously considered the best Australian football umpire in the country.

Victoria's top Australian rules football umpires John Trait was employed for the special match. In Melbourne media he was referred to as the "Prince of Umpires". When Trait took to the field he was greeted by a loud cheer. The match was considered the best of the season in South Australia and partial credit was given to John Trait's umpiring helping facilitate the spectacle. James Shaw, the mayor of Adelaide at the time, complimented Trait after the match for his umpiring. After the game William Bushby approached Trait and said that himself and "all his team were quite satisfied" with the umpires decisions.

=== Additional trains ===
The state government put on additional trains on the Port Adelaide line in anticipation for the large attendance for the match.

=== Wagers ===
A large amount of money was bet on the game compared to normal for football matches in Adelaide at the time. Overall Port Adelaide were favourites with punters early, especially with smaller bets. However, by the time the game started Norwood had been backed into favouritism as a result of some late large stakes.

=== Police clear Switchback rollercoaster ===
Extra police were deployed for the match, and post-game reports suggest that there was little incident apart from the need to clear the switchback railway of people trying to garner a vantage point of the match.

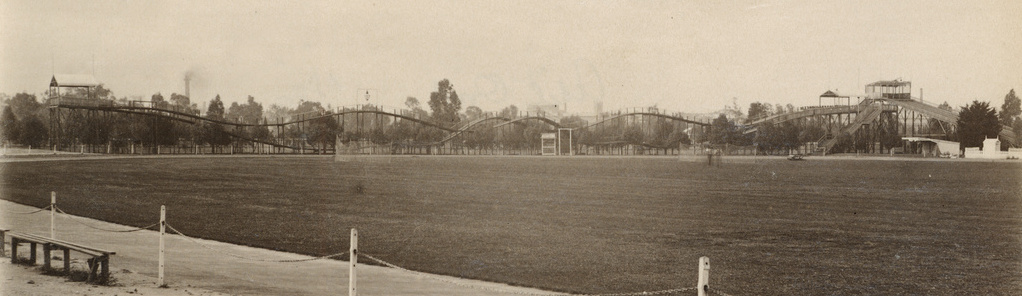
Police were required to clear people from climbing Adelaide Oval's switchback rollercoaster, as many in the large crowd were seeking prime vantage points to watch the match.

== Match summary ==
Norwood won the toss and elected to kick with the wind towards the Riverbank end.

=== First quarter ===
As a result of Norwood winning the toss, Port Adelaide's John McKenzie started the match and kicked north towards the scoreboard end. Straight away both teams played at a frantic pace. Following an even contest for the ball in front of the members' pavilion, Port Adelaide player Rudolph Ewers was thrown on the boundary-line. As a result, umpire Trait paid him a free. Ewers used this free to kick forward to George Davis, who himself would receive another free for a breach, and Hamilton obtaining from Davis with a beautiful kicked the first Grand Final's first goal.

After scoring the first goal, the Port Adelaide players settled to work quickly. The dash of Port players had somewhat surprised Norwood, but they replied with an equally strong rush. Port Adelaide defender Tomlin for a moment averted the danger posed by the Norwood's rush, but Charlie Woods, who was following, aided by Daly, landed the leather right forward, where it went out. At the resulting throw in Charlie Woods was held and was awarded a free which he used to kick a goal and equalize the scores.

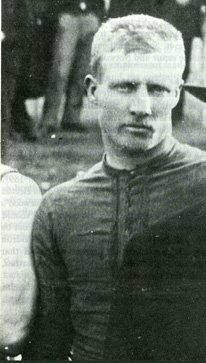
Norwood captain-coach Alfred Waldron.

Rudolph Ewers of the Ports started the next play and beat his opponent Oswald Bertram forcing the Norwoods to quickly defend. A little mark gave Harry Phillips a chance but the often reliable player missed. Waldron and Rawson transferred to the centre, where Daly and McGrath sent it forward, bat Dempster was in the way, and the Ports with a fast rush stormed the Norwoods' citadel. Charlie Fry passed to Davis, and again the red flag went up.

Both teams were making tremendous effort, and the football shown was of the highest quality. The Norwoods, who were reserving some of their men, had Roberts and McGrath off following, Woods and Wilson taking their places.

Off again, Norwood with a quick, concerted movement, placed the Ports on the defensive. Roberts tried a long shot, but the ball only landed in front. Woods marked a good distance off, and with unerring aim sent the sphere clean through the centre. Two goals each and no behinds.

Again the eastern team, who were showing splendid, clean football, prevailed, Shaw being responsible for the sphere going forward. J. Fry relieved to the pavilion, but an exchange of marks gave McGaffin the ball, and he sent to Waldron, the old veteran, who was playing a wonderful game, passed to Slattery, and he from the side sent the ball again between the posts, but the umpire was not in a position to see the ball going through, and gave it a behind.

Nothing disheartened, the Norwoods returned to the attack, Charlie Woods sending it forward, and then Lowe made a mistake: The ball came up to goal, and instead of kicking with the wind, he turned round and dispatched across. The ball was rolling past the goal when Dixon making a desperate effort touched it with his foot, and it went through within six inches of the post.

The play was next taken to the Ports' forwards, where Roachock stopped the attack, but two brilliant marks by Webb and C. Fry gave the latter a chance, and he kicked right into goal. Bertram, relieved, and Phillips from a free gave Charlie Fry an opportunity which he fully capitalised kicking Port's third goal.

Roachock stopped another attack, and then Rawson, Dixon, and Guster made a forward movement. Through the instrumentality of Kenneth McKenzie the ball was taken down to the centre, and J. Woods marked well. The Ports, however, made a determined rush. Miers and J. McKenzie gave Phillips a long shot, and he hit the post.

Quarter time: Norwood 3.1 – Port Adelaide 3.1

At quarter-time the board showed scores were level.

=== Second quarter ===
The Ports with the aid of the wind started the second quarter with the first attack. However Jackson warded off the Ports rebounding to Shaw and Roberts who troubled the Ports' back line. Woods subsequently receiving a free on the boundary from a very difficult angle successfully kicked the Norwoods' fourth goal.

On kicking off a very bad attempt at marking by the Norwoods let in Gardiner, and he sent the ball forward. Combe and Daly kept the Norwood goal out of danger on their end, and then the Ports tried the other wing, and worked the ball across to the pavilion, where Stephens, who was working very hard in the ruck, showed up. After the sphere had traversed the ground Hills tried a shot, and the ball passed just outside the post. Kempster, beating two Norwoods, kept the play in the Norwoods' territory but an exchange of marks sent to the other end, where McGaffin and C. Woods missed badly. Then for a time the Norwood back men were kept hard at work at the river end. Eventually Phillips was given an opportunity but he could only manage another behind.

Norwood with a fast rush transferred play to the other end, but equally as fast was returned. Kempster, Stevens, and Ewers helped W. Bushby, Stephens, and Correll to futile shots.

Half time: Norwood 4.1 – Port Adelaide 3.3

At half time Norwood held a one-goal lead.

=== Third quarter ===
After the half time interval the Ports were the first to gain ascendency of the play with some aggressive tactics. C. Fry gave John McKenzie a shot, which he missed. Arthur Jackson worked the ball out of the Norwood defence, but the Ports were making a great effort in keeping the Norwood goal in danger. However, Hamilton and J. McKenzie would both miss chances, with the latter getting a behind. Daly was instrumental in stifling the Port attack.

Again the Ports put all their power into the play, and Gardner finished up a nice run with a good kick. Hills placed in front to Le Leu who finally converted an opportunity for Port and a loud cheer from their supporters announced that the scores were equal.

The Ports continued their ascendancy in the play for a short while but state of the scoreboard eventually forced the Norwood's into action and by a series of long kicks and marks they forced the Ports to defend. Dixon placed up, and Shaw smartly passed to Guster, who proved reliable kicking the Norwood's fifth goal.

A determined effort by the Ports placed the Norwoods' backs in trouble, and another behind came from Hamilton.

Gardner and Tomlin pressured any forward movements of the Norwood players keeping the ball in their opponents' territory. This eventually resulted in Davis putting Phillips in possession, but once more the usually accurate kicker sent the ball behind.

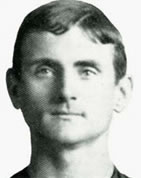
After marking on the wing, John Daly with a run tried for a 55-metre kick, which just missed, scoring Norwood's second behind for the match.

McKee and J. Woods raised the siege along the gate wing, and Daly securing tried a sixty-yard kick which was very close to registering a goal but only resulted in Norwood's second behind.

Rawson and Wilson kept the ball close up to the Port Adelaide goal with Kenneth McKenzie working hard to prevent a Norwood score. When Alfred Robert gained a chance at scoring an easy goal he mulled the opportunity and only registered a behind.

Bushby beat Daly, and the leather went to the other end, Phillips securing yet another behind for the Ports.

Three quarter time: Norwood 5.3 – Port Adelaide 4.7

When the final change took place the score was:— Norwood 5 goals 3 behinds to Port 4 goals 7 behinds.

=== Fourth quarter ===
With deafening cries from the partisan supporters of both teams, the players took to the field and went into work at a great pace. The Norwoods had evidently reserved themselves for a big final stanza. A series of marks by Rawson, Daly, and McGrath gave Shaw an opportunity, and the game looked all over as the ball went right up to the goal, but it fell short, and J. Fry secured. Taking it around the gate wing the Ports called upon the Norwoods to defend. Hamilton dispatched to Hills, who kicked a behind. Shortly after John McKenzie kicked Port Adelaide's ninth behind.

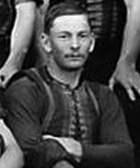
After five earlier behinds, Harry Phillips finally kicked a goal in the early stages of the fourth quarter to level the scores.

The Norwoods played wonderfully well together, successfully executing long kicks and marks. They transferred the play to the Ports' end, where Webb defended. Sending it along the pavilion wing Hills gave Phillips another chance, and he made amends for previous misses by equalizing the score.

With time rapidly drawing on the teams were urged on by their supporters, and the Norwoods made a gallant effort, whilst the Ports defended in equal style. The Norwood's however, seemed to have a little bit in hand, and by some good marking Waldron forwarded to McGaffin, and his kick put the Norwoods a goal ahead.

At this time in the game H.G. Hamilton seized up with the cramp and struggled to contribute for the rest of the game. Resuming, the Norwoods again attacked, and their combined play was too good for their opponents. In a scrimmage some distance from the goal C. Woods put his foot to the sphere and sent it between the uprights. The umpire thinking a Port man had kicked it did not give a decision, and nothing was registered. By Mr Traits order the ball was kicked off from behind, and then some hot play ensued in the Ports' quarters. K. McKenzie got away from two Norwoods, but Roachock outwitted him. Rawson, Roberts, and Gaster kept the ball forward, and Daly missed a running shot. Then O. Bertram also tried a running shot, and a loud cheer greeted another Norwood goal.

With everything to gain the Ports started off again, but before anything serious had eventuated the bell rang out, and the great contest was over, leaving the Norwood team premiers of 1889.

Full-time: Norwood 7.4 – Port Adelaide 5.9

The final score was Norwood—7 goals 4 behinds. Port Adelaide—5 goals 9 behinds.

== Teams ==
From their previous match Norwood replaced Haldane, Honner and McCarthy with John McGrath, Oswald Bertram and Patrick Roachock. Port Adelaide replaced Miller with Maurice Lowe.

Norwood
| Robert Bertram | Oswald Bertram | George Combe |
| William Dixon | John Daly | William Guster |
| Alfred Grayson | Arthur Jackson | George McKee |
| Jack McGaffin | John McGrath | Guff Rawson |
| Alfred Roberts | Patrick Roachock | Jim Shaw |
| William Slattery | John Woods | Charles Woods |
| Bob Wilson | Alfred Waldron (c) | |

Port Adelaide
| Alfred Bushby | William Bushby (c) | Richard Correll |
| George Davis | Rudolph Ewers | James Fry |
| Charlie Fry | Percy Gardiner | H.G. Hamilton |
| Henry Hills | Walter Kempster | Frank Le Leu |
| Maurice Lowe | John McKenzie | Kenneth McKenzie |
| Alfred Miers | Harry Phillips | Henry Stephens |
| Albert Tomlin | George Webb | |

== Scorecard ==
Grand Final
Saturday, 5 October (3:00 pm) | Norwood | def. | Port Adelaide | Adelaide Oval (crowd: 11,000)
3.1; 4.1; 5.3; 7.4 | Q1; Q2; Q3; Final | 3.1; 3.3; 4.7; 5.9 | Umpires: John Trait
C.Woods 3 O.Bertram, W Dixon, W Guster, J McGaffin 1 | Goals | 1 Hamilton, Davis, C. Fry, Le Leu, Phillips
Injuries | H.G. Hamilton (cramp)
This was the first Grand Final in elite Australian rules football history scheduled by a controlling body to break a tie for first place after the end of the home-and-away season.
