= Harry Hewitt =

Australian rules footballer (c.1862–1907)

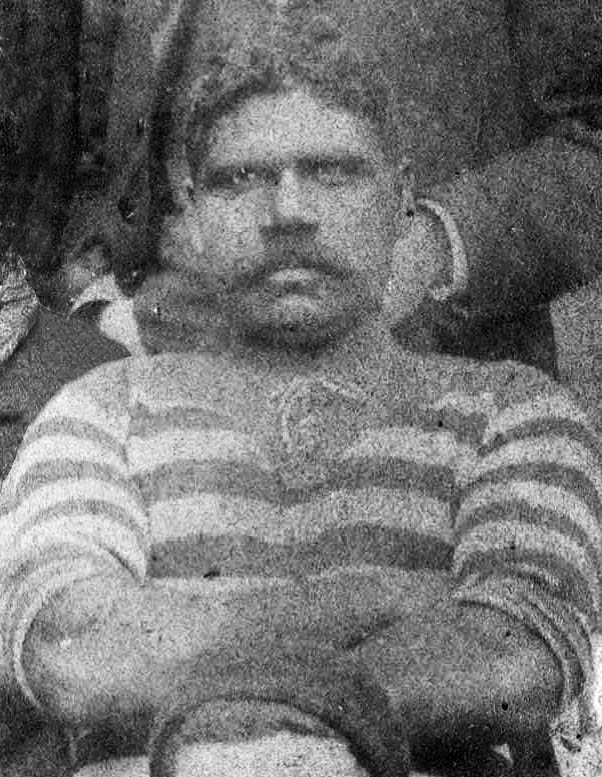
- Hewitt in 1894

Personal information
- Full name: Harry Hewitt
- Born: c. 1862; South-eastern South Australia
- Died: 23 January 1907 (approx. 45)
- Original team: Point McLeay
- Positions: Back pocket, rover

Playing career
Years	Club	Games (Goals)
1889, 1891–1892	Medindie	5 (0)
1891	Port Adelaide	1 (0)

Career highlights
- First Indigenous Australian to play in SANFL.

Harry Hewitt, sometimes spelled "Hewit", "Ewart" or "Hewett", (c. 1861 – 23 January 1907) was an Indigenous Australian cricketer and Australian rules footballer. In 1889, Hewitt played for the Medindie Football Club, and so is believed to be the first Indigenous Australian to play in the South Australian Football Association (SAFA), known today as the South Australian National Football League (SANFL).

== Early life ==
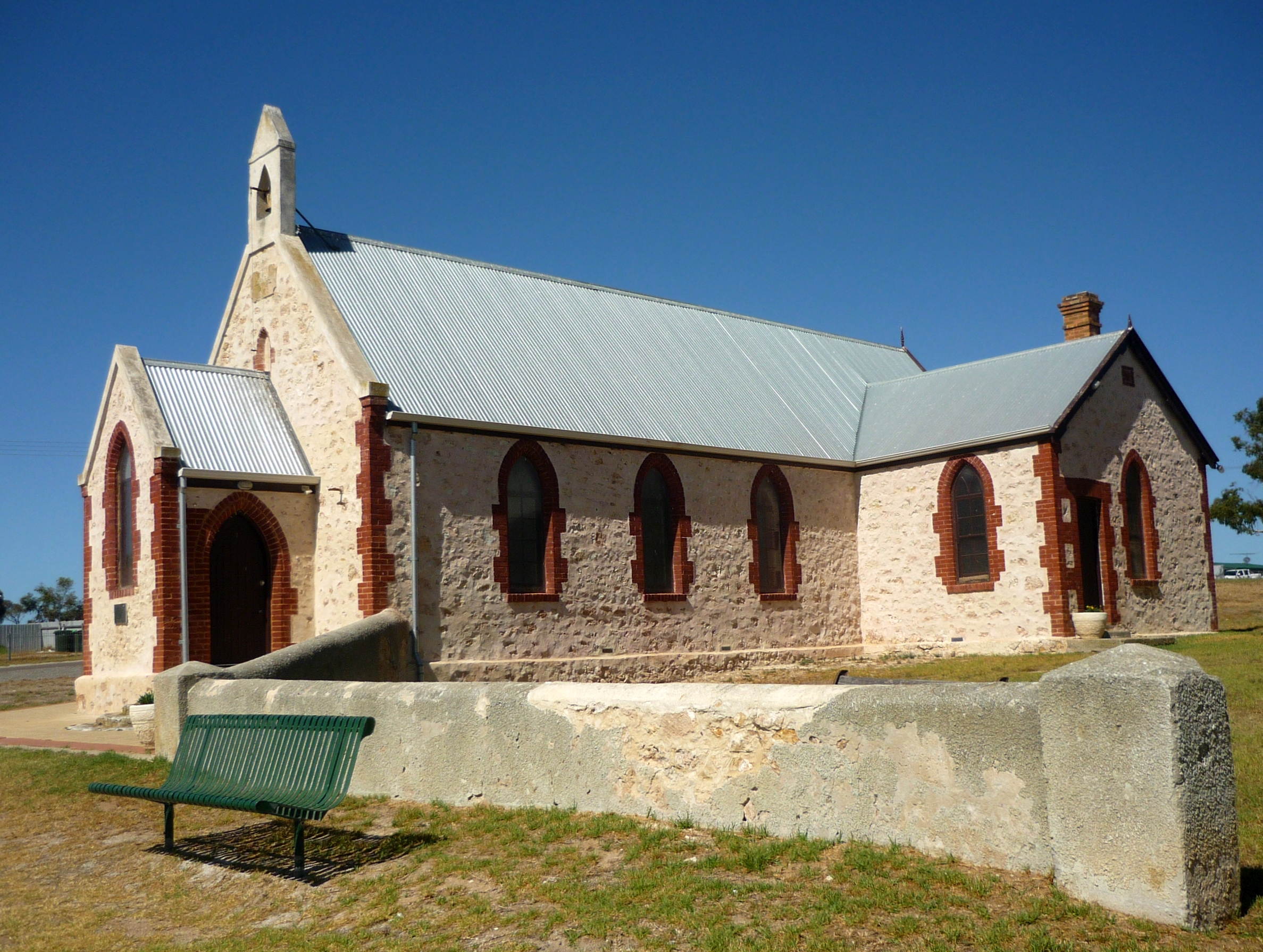
The Point McLeay Mission church. Point McLeay has now reverted to its original name used by the Indigenous population, Raukkan.

Hewitt was born in the south-east of South Australia. Hewitt was a member of the Bungandidj people. As a child he was taken to the Point McLeay Mission station. Around this time David Uniapon would have been born at the Point McLeay Mission. From 1995 to 2018 the Point McLeay Mission church appeared on the Australian fifty-dollar note along with David Unaipon.

Hewitt was said to be a "champion climber", once climbing a tall gum tree on the banks of the Hindmarsh River in Victor Harbor and carving his initials in it at the top of the trunk with a tomahawk.

Alongside Hewitt other noted Indigenous Australian sportsmen from Point McLeay were Mansell and Ephraim Tripp.

== Football ==
During the 1880s Hewitt and other Point McLeay Mission Indigenous Australians would travel to Adelaide to play Australian rules football matches against city teams. During their stays in Adelaide the Point McLeay players would often sleep under the trees at Unley Park.

=== Strathalbyn plays Point McLeay (1884) ===
On 26 July 1884 the first game between the Strathalbyn Football Club and Point McLeay, in Strathalbyn. Strathalbyn won this first encounter five goals to nil with Hewitt named among the best players for Point Mcleay. On 2 August 1884 Strathalbyn travelled to Milang to play the footballers of Point McLeay. Strahyalbyn won the game whilst Hewitt was named among Point McLeay's best players. On 16 August 1884 a rematch between Strathalbyn and Point McLeay took place, this time in Strathalbyn. Strathalbyn won the game two goals, six behinds to Point McLeay's five behinds. Hewitt was named as one of Point McLeay's best players.

=== Exhibition games (1885) ===
On 29 May 1885 a football match on Adelaide Oval was organised by the SAFA between an All-Indigenous team (titled 'Aboriginals') captained by Hewitt and a combined team (titled 'Wanderers') selected by retired Port Adelaide player Thomas Smith composed of players from Port Juniors, LeFevre Peninsula, Fitzroy and Kingston. The 'Wanderers' side benefited by the inclusion of James "Joker" Hall and Harold Haldane of South Adelaide and George McKee and Edward "Ted" Woods of Norwood. Meanwhile, the 'Aboriginals' side, predominantly made up of those from Point McLeay, was supplemented by six Indigenous player from the LeFevre Peninsula. Before the game started there was some criticism that the Wanderers team would be too strong for the All-Indigenous team. The match was very close and ended in a draw with most who attended the game holding the view that Hewitt's side had the better of the play. The All-Indigenous team played the match barefoot.

On 2 June 1885, after the success of the 'Wanderers v Aboriginals' game, another match involving Hewitt and other Indigenous players was organised and played on Adelaide Oval. This second game was advertised as the 'Point MacLeay Blackfellows v. Wanderers'. For this second match the Wanderers side featured about 12 prominent SAFA players. Hewitt was again captain of the Point MacLeay team. The Point MacLeay team would win this second match by one goal.

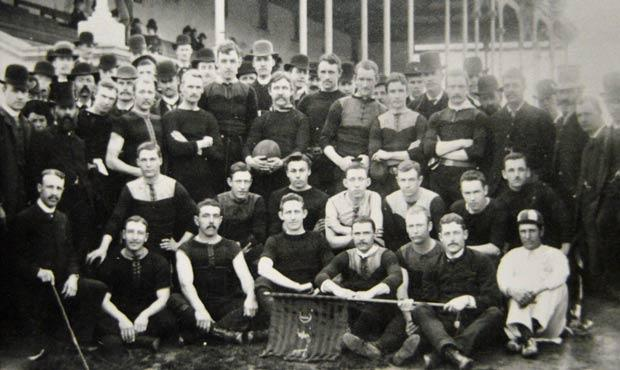
In 1885 Hewitt's Point McLeay side drew against senior SAFA side Old Adelaide (pictured) on Adelaide Oval.

In July 1885 the Point McLeay team returned to Adelaide to play another series of games. By this time the Indigenous Point McLeay players had developed a reputation in Adelaide. On 6 July 1885 a match on Adelaide Oval between Point McLeay and senior SAFA club Old Adelaide attracted a, then respectable, crowd of 3,000 with Hewitt again captain. The Point McLeay team would impressively record a draw against Old Adelaide.

On 6 July 1885, Hewitt captained the Point McLeay team against a side composed Prince Alfred and Whinham College players with the college team winning by 1 goal.

=== South Australian Football Association (1889–1892) ===
On the 22 June 1889 Hewitt made his senior debut for Medindie in the South Australian Football Association (SAFA) in a game against Port Adelaide at Adelaide Oval. In the lead up to this game some of Medindie's senior players were unavailable leading that club to offer Hewitt the opportunity to make his SAFA debut. The Port Adelaide News, a local newspaper at the time, wrote a glowing appraisal of his play stating "The Medindies had their full strength; Hewit, an aboriginal, was a decided acquisition, and although he played barefooted was about the best man amongst them, his alacrity all through the game eliciting the applause of the spectators. He, too, appeared to have a thorough knowledge of the rules of the game, as he never had a mark given against him the whole of the afternoon." Hewitt noted with pride after the match that most of the players on his team were members of the Blue Ribbon Army but was disappointed that around nine of the best Point McLeay footballers were unable to play in the match.

On 29 June 1889 Hewitt had retained his place in the Medindie side and was joined by another Indigenous Australian, Alfie Spender, in a match against Norwood on Kensington Oval. Norwood proved too strong for Medindie who failed to score against the eventual premiers.

On the 13 July 1889 Hewitt and Medindie organised to bring the Point McLeay football team to Kensington Oval to play Medindie with boomerang demonstrations during the breaks.

In June 1891, the South Australia Register highlighted Hewitt's game for Medindie in a win against Adelaide at Kensington Oval insisting that "A word of praise must be given to Harry Hewitt, the aboriginal. Only once during the game, when he got hold of the ball, was he caught and spoiled. His running especially deserves recording, and he ought to prove of great benefit to the Medindies". Another newspaper, the Adelaide Observer considered him a unanimous best afield for the match.

On 1 August 1891, Hewitt played for Port Adelaide against a travelling Fitzroy at Adelaide Oval. Port Adelaide's captain Ken McKenzie positioned Hewitt in the team's full-back line at the start of the match. In the third quarter Hewitt "cleverly" set up a goal that was kicked by John McKenzie, brother of Ken. During the game the Port Adelaide supporters voiced their criticism regarding a holding the ball call made against Hewitt by umpire Schaeffer. Port Adelaide defeated Fitzroy by 2 goals.

Harry Hewitt's top level Australian rules football matches
Date	Team	Opponent	Ground	Crowd	Result
22 June 1889	Medindie	Port Adelaide	Adelaide Oval		Loss
29 June 1889	Medindie	Norwood	Kensington Oval		Loss
23 May 1891	Medindie	South Adelaide	Adelaide Oval		Loss
30 May 1891	Medindie	Adelaide	Kensington Oval		Win
1 August 1891	Port Adelaide	Fitzroy (VFA)	Adelaide Oval	4000	Win
2 July 1892	Medindie	South Adelaide	Adelaide Oval	300	Win

=== Later football years ===
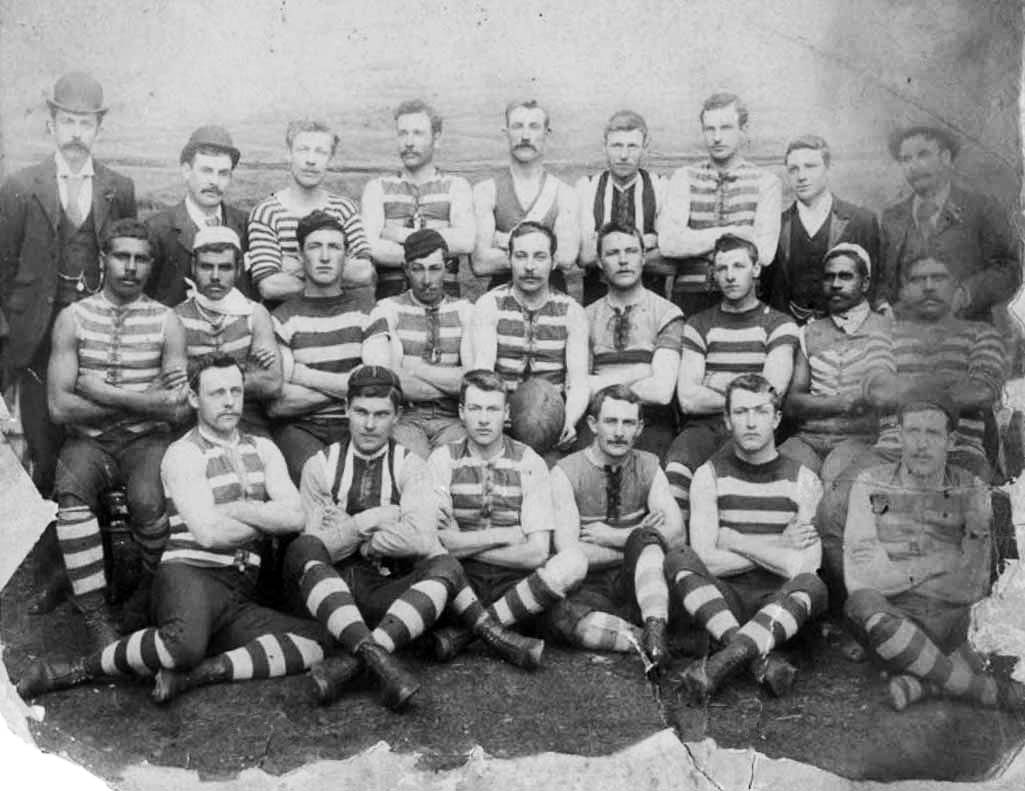
The Southern South Australia team that played in the Annual 'North–South' game at the Adelaide Oval on August 18, 1894. Hewitt is pictured at the far right of the middle row.

In 1892 Hewitt was selected in a representative side from the Southern half of South Australia to play a team representing the Northern half with players from 31 clubs across the state having players submitted. Hewitt's Southern side would win the match with the South Australian Chronicle praising the play of himself and fellow Point McLeay teammate Wilson stating that "A feature of the game was the introduction of four natives from the Point Mcleay station, and as far as two of them — J. Wilson and Harry Hewitt are concerned they played the game of the forty in the first half, and subsequently did splendid service for their side. Both are strongly-built men, play a gentlemanly game, and are most unselfish. Wilson in the ruck and Hewitt roving treated the spectators to some clever football, their agility in nonplussing their opponents and exceedingly smart passing on from one to another being unsurpassed, and the spectators time after time expressed their approval of the brilliancy of their work."

During 1897 Hewitt played for the Milang Football Club. During that year one third of the Milang team were Indigenous Australians. Hewitt also played for Goolwa in 1897.

=== Football legacy ===
Hewitt is considered to be the first Indigenous Australian to play in the SANFL, known as the SAFA in 1889.

In 2020 the Port Adelaide Football Club, for the Australian Football League's (AFL) Sir Doug Nicholls Indigenous Round, produced a guernsey that featured the names of all its Indigenous Australian players up until that point in time, including Hewitt.

== Cricket ==
On 15 April 1882 the North Adelaide Cricket Club travelled to Milang to play a team of locals supplemented by some residents of Point McLeay including Hewitt. The Milang and Point McLeay combination defeated North Adelaide by 9 runs. In a match report for this game noted that "Wilson and Hewett (natives) at wicket and point respectively particularly distinguished themselves."

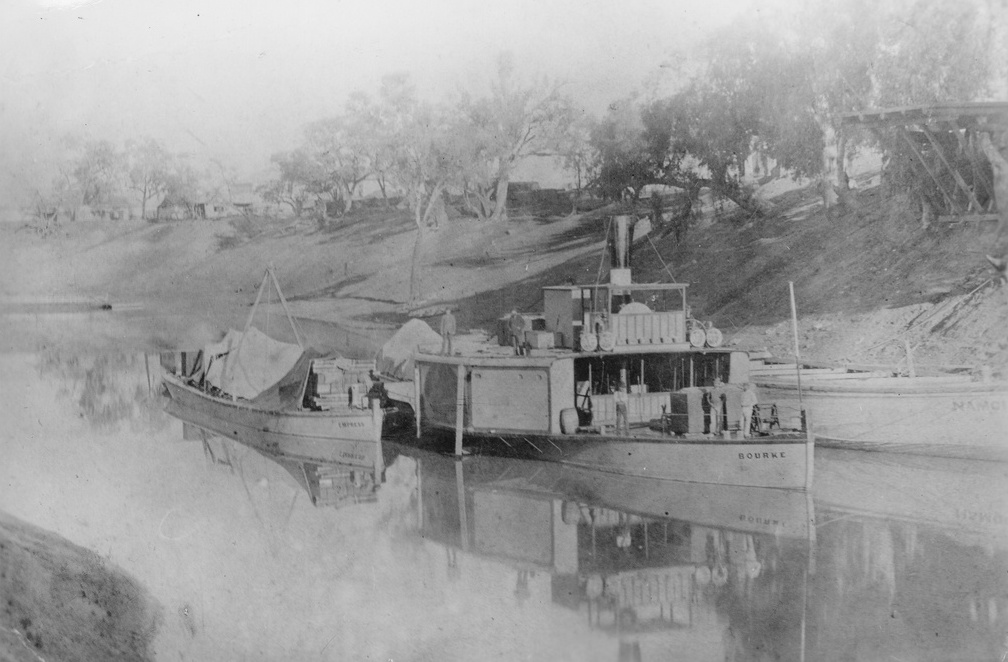
Murray River paddle steamer 'Bourke' transported the Milang Cricket Club players to Point McLeay in 1885

On 9 November 1885 the Milang Cricket Club travelled via a paddle steamer called the 'Bourke' to Point McLeay to play a game against the missions Indigenous population. Hewitt took 6 wickets for 12 runs during Milang's second innings. The Point McLeay team won by 16 runs.

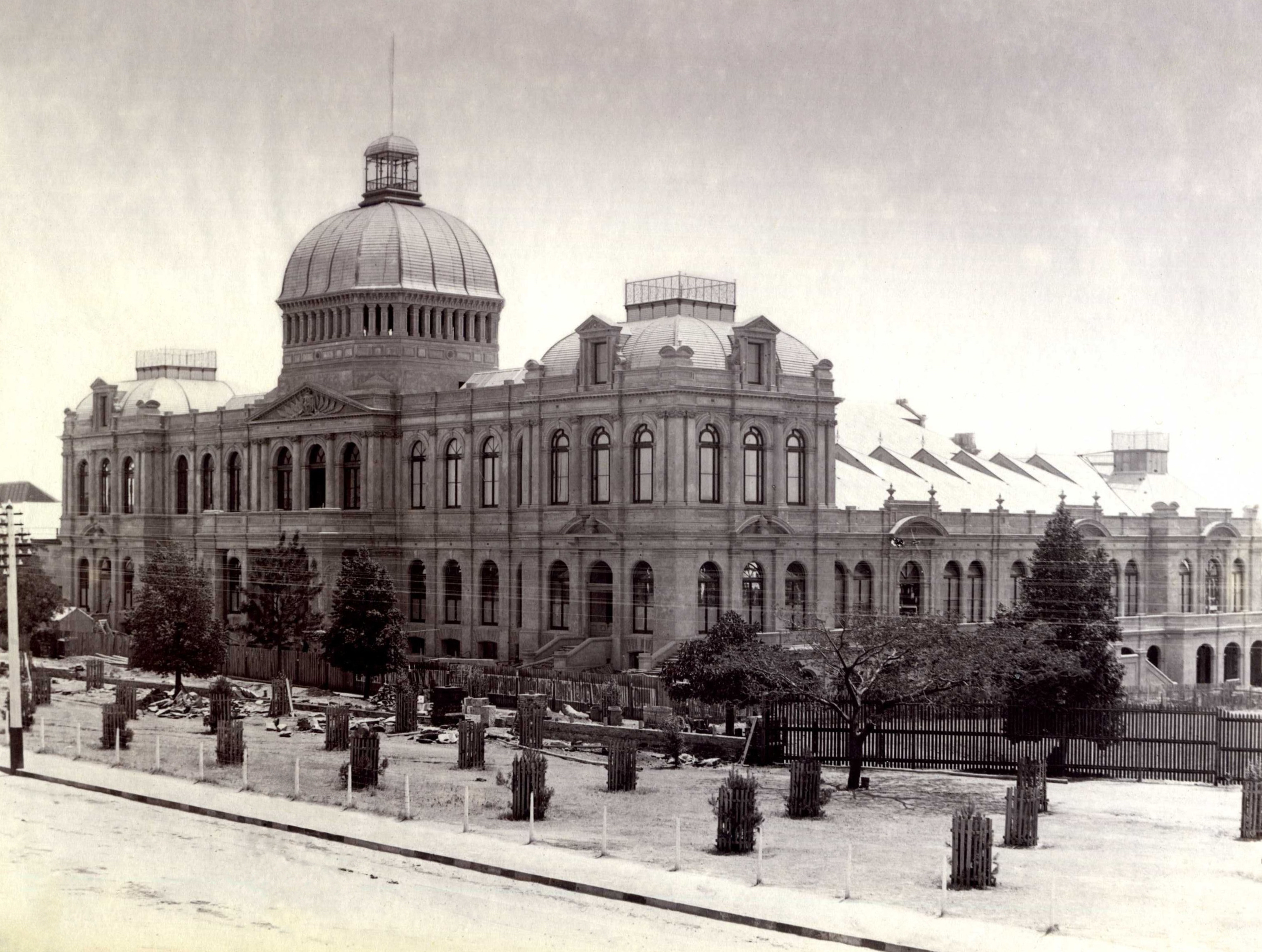
In 1887 Hewitt stayed on the grounds of the Adelaide Jubilee International Exhibition on the same week that he played some cricket matches in Adelaide.

On 21 November 1887 a cricket match between the 'Wanderers v. Aboriginals' was played on Adelaide Oval with the latter team made up of players from Point McLeay including Hewitt. The 'Wanderers' team which won the match included Arthur Ernest Ayers, son of Henry Ayers. On 23 November 1887 the Point McLeay team played the Torrenside Cricket Club on Jubilee Oval. It was reported that the Point McLeay residents whilst visiting Adelaide stayed on the Jubilee Exhibition Building grounds and were not allowed to leave the area without permission and were not to do so alone. The Point McLeay residents were, in addition to the cricket match, in Adelaide to see the 1887 Adelaide Jubilee International Exhibition.

In 1892, Hewitt had a batting average of 130 for Point McLeay in the local competition. On 15 January 1892 Hewitt played for a side called 'The Federals' against Medindie where he scored 126 runs. On 12 March 1892 Hewitt scored 107 runs, not out, for Point McLeay in a win over Mount Barker in Littlehampton. In a match report of the Littlehampton game it was said that "the bowlers did not have much trouble with the other natives, but Hewitt's long stand quite demoralised the team". In light of these performances a regular writer for the South Australian Register wrote under the pseudonym 'Point' showed support for Hewitt writing "Excellent performances these. Go on, Harry, my boy, keep at it, and may you get into an intercolonial before long".

In 1893 Hewitt played in the 'North v. South' match on Adelaide Oval for the latter team. In the first innings Hewitt scored 42 runs before being bowled by John Humphreys. In the second innings Hewitt lost his wicket on the first ball. The South team would end up winning the match.

In 1894 an Indigenous cricket team featuring Hewitt trounced a white team in Goolwa 116 to 33. Hewitt was the leading runs scorer registering 51.

In 1895 whilst playing for a Northern Adelaide cricket team known as the Federal eleven against a side representing Prospect, Hewitt scored 144 not out. During Christmas week in 1895 Hewitt was selected to play on Adelaide Oval in a match between 'South-West v. South-East' for the latter side.

In an 1897 edition of "Cricket Notes" in the Adelaide Evening Journal, when discussing local country cricketers in South Australia, he was described as being "The best batsman we met was the evergreen Harry Hewitt at Port Victor, whose batting, bowling, and fielding were worthy of his palmiest days". During the 1897-98 cricket season playing for the Goolwa Cricket Club, Hewitt averaged 64.75 runs batting and bowled with an economy of 7.37.

In July 1898 Hewitt wrote to a South Australian District Cricket club asking if he could play. In 1898 Hewitt captained the Point McLeay cricket team against a team representing Clare in Clare. During a break in the game the Point McLeay players provided boomerang throwing demonstrations.

During Easter in 1899 the Port Adelaide Cricket Club travelled to the Murray Mouth via paddle steamer 'Singapore' to play a game against the Goolwa Cricket Club. During this match Hewitt played for Goolwa and was said to have been "in good bowling form, and secured the best average". John McKenzie, retired Port Adelaide footballer, was captain of the cricket club at this time. When Hewitt played for Port Adelaide in 1891, McKenzie was a teammate.

On 9 February 1901 the Sturt Cricket Club opened their new pavilion on Unley Oval with a match against a combined team representing Point McLeay and Point Pierce captained by Hewitt. On 11 February 1901 the Point McLeay and Point Pierce cricket teams played each other on Adelaide Oval with Hewitt playing for the former. Point Pierce won this match by 23 runs.

In his last season of cricket for a club representing Victor Harbor, Hewitt averaged 70 runs for the season.

=== Cricket technique ===
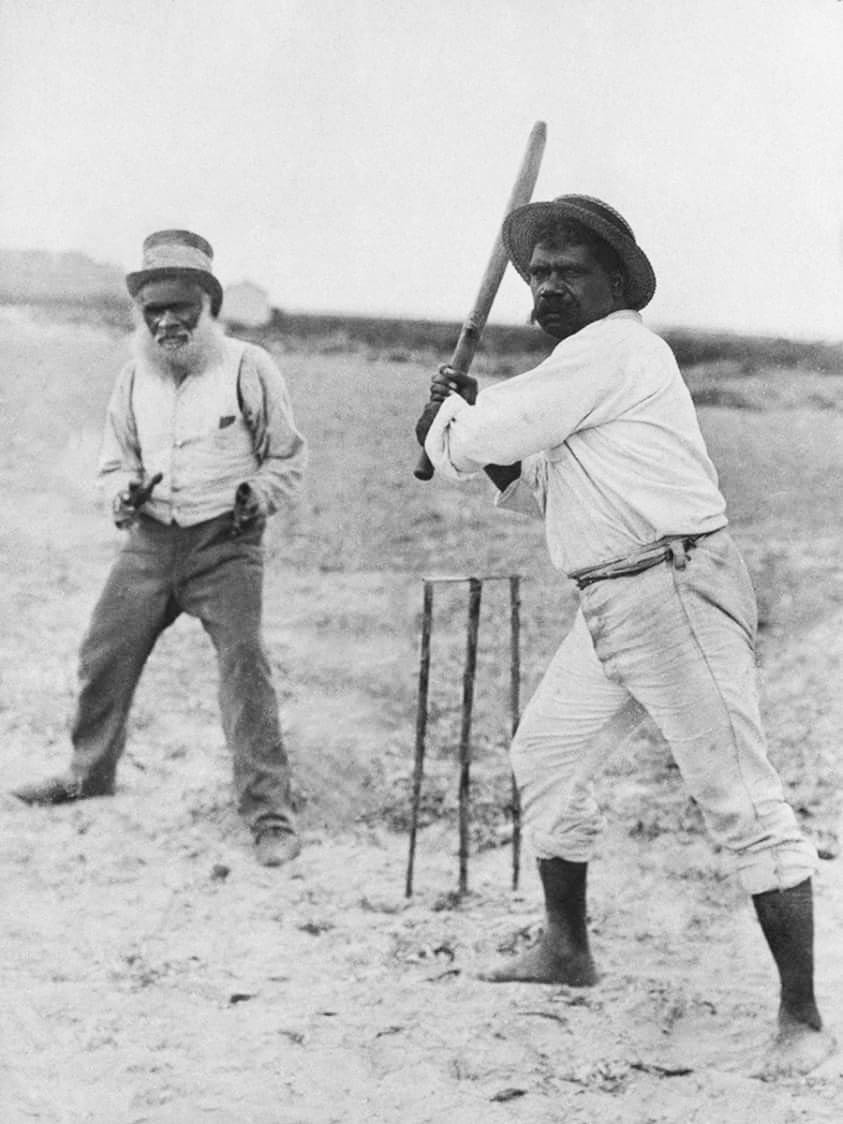
Hewitt (right) posing for a photo in Victor Harbor around 1905 with Tommy Wagner (left).

It was said that as a cricketer Hewitt possessed a "very fine late cut stroke". Hewitt was described as having an "unusual stance at the wicket, but knew how to hit the ball with considerable power—and where to place it". In regards to his running between the wickets it was stated that "Harry would be at the opposite wicket almost before the other fellow knew what was happening". He was described as a "wonderful" fielder.

"Harry Hewitt in the realm of sport had few equals. At cricket he was quite an entertainment, especially at the wicket. I often tried to bowl him out, but without success. It was like bowling at a well-charred stump. Harry with his pants rolled knee high, no boots, standing right in line with the wicket, stern end almost to bowler, head low down, looking over left shoulder, and those flashing black eyes, made the more conspicuous by the large whites showing, was a most formidable object to bowl at."

== Indigenous representative ==
=== Criticism of fishing licence ===
In the 1880s Hewitt fished in the Inman River with his friend Leonard Lovegrove. In his later years Hewitt sought to make a living as a fisherman in Milang. Hewitt wrote to, and was published by, the Adelaide Advertiser regarding his grievances about the treatment of Indigenous people in regards to fishing licences. He was quoted as saying:

"Sir, As an aboriginal, may I say a few words about the fisherman's license? First, the white man took the land from us and killed our game, and now he expects us to pay £1 license before we can catch fish for the market. True, we can catch fish for our own use without a license, but what is the good of that? We have few opportunities for earning a livelihood, and now they are trying to stop us from earning a honest shilling. They are not getting rid of us fast enough, too they think they will starve us out. Perhaps, however, the Government have some means of keeping us in comfort, so that we won't have to trouble about getting our living – I am."

=== Corroborees ===
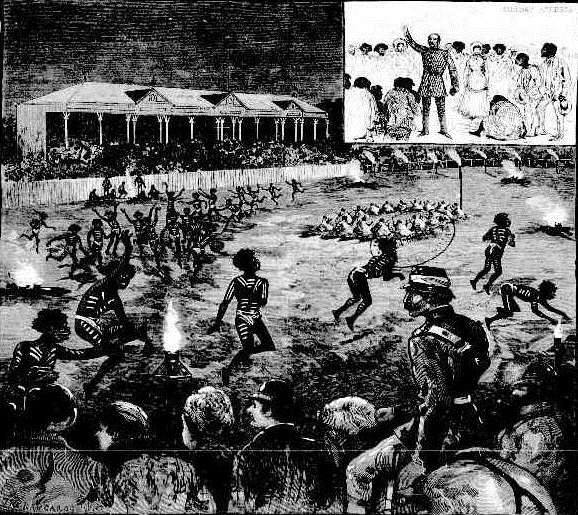
Indigenous Australian's from Point McLeay performed a corroboree on Adelaide Oval from 29 and 30 May 1885.

On the nights of 29 and 30 May 1885 members of Point McLeay performed two corroborees on Adelaide Oval. This event was organised by the Government of South Australia to coincide with the week of the Queen's Birthday. The corroboree was originally going to take place on Jubilee Oval but John Creswell of the South Australian Cricket Association intervened close to the staging of the event and successfully negotiated for the use of Adelaide Oval in exchange for half the event's ticket proceeds. The corroboree took place after the 'Aboriginals v Wanderers' football match that Hewitt played in. Hewitt helped facilitate the corroboree as an Indigenous leader. It was estimated that 20,000 spectators were present for the corroborate on the night of 29 May. This attendance represented one-sixth of Adelaide's population and was the largest event staged at Adelaide Oval in the nineteenth century. Over £200 was raised that evening. It was claimed that the profits raised from the corroboree would be used to benefit the Indigenous members of Point McLeay.

On 10 February 1905 Hewitt personally organised a corroboree with 20 other Indigenous Australians in Victor Harbour and it was said "almost the whole town turned out to witness the event". Hewitt's self organised corroboree was considered notable by historian Michael Parsons for three reasons being that it was "independently organised", deliberately located in a tourist area, that being Victor Harbour, and featured "war dance" and "actions of warlike character".

=== Boomerang demonstrations ===
Hewitt met Sir Edward Lucas in Victor Harbour and taught the latter how to throw a boomerang. Later when Lucas was appointed Agent-General in London, he would provide demonstrations of throwing the boomerang in London's Regent's Park crediting Hewitt for his proficiency.

During Easter in 1906 the Our Boys Institute, a branch of the YMCA, visited Victor Harbour and Hewitt provided boomerang demonstrations for the organisations children.

== Temperance ==
As early as the 1880s Hewitt espoused his proudness of being a member of the Blue Ribbon Army temperance movement. On 3 June 1885 Hewitt addressed an audience in the Adelaide City Mission praising temperance. He would do the same fortnightly at the Point Macleay Mission urging locals to the claims of temperance and would organise men to play football games in Adelaide who were members of the Blue Ribbon Army.

== Personal life ==
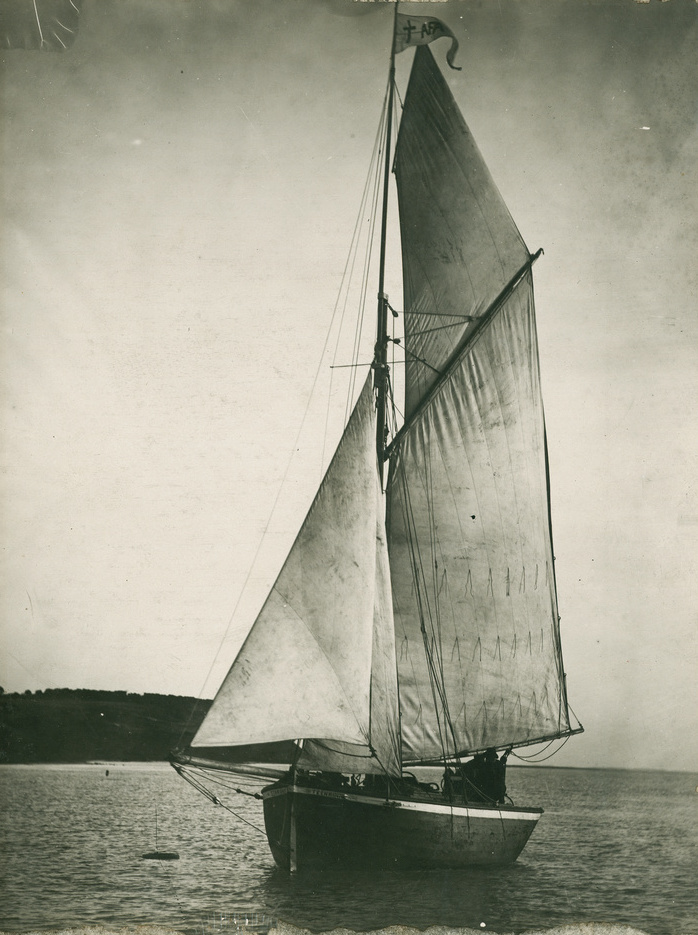
Hewitt was employed as a boatman by the Point McLeay Mission and was responsible for the schooner 'Teen Minnie' (pictured).

Hewitt was a Bungandidj man.

Hewitt's first wife was Mary Unaipon. The couple married in 1884. Mary was the daughter of James Unaipon and the brother of David. Hewitt and Mary had a daughter named Ruth. Ruth was a pianist. Mary died in 1891.

Hewitt's second marriage was to Agnes. It was suggested in 1959 that the local geographic landmark in Goolwa colloqualily referred to as "Aggie's Knob" was named after Agnes. Hewitt fathered a son with Agnes called Oliver. On 15 August 1917 Oliver enlisted for the Australian Imperial Force. Oliver served as a private for Australia during World War 1.

Hewitt was said to be "remarkably good" at English. He could "read and write, and was conversant with a variety of subjects". It was said that "Hewitt was a keen reader, and displayed wide knowledge of Australian and overseas events as outlined in his daily newspaper. It was stated that had Hewitt been provided an education at a young age he would have "made a fine business man".

He also enjoyed dancing and was described as being "remarkably light on his feet for a heavy man". He was noted to have "excelled as an acrobat and gymnast, and was for some time connected with a travelling circus".

By 1907 Hewitt had become employed as a boatman by the Point McLeay Mission. That year he was in charge of a boat named the "Teen Minnie". The boat cost the Point McLeay Mission £120 in 1886 and was named after the first female Indigenous Australian in South Australia claimed to embrace Christianity.

At one point in time Hewitt was associated with the Salvation Army and attained the rank of corporal in that organisation.

Hewitt was also a noted swimmer.

=== Death ===
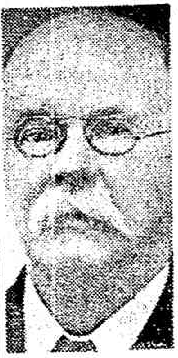
In 1930 D.H. Griffin, the Mayor of Victor Harbor, stated his belief that Hewitt was not intoxicated on the night of his death and that he was murdered by hammer blows.

On the morning of 24 January 1907, Hewitt was found dead due an impact to the head which had crushed his skull. The only witness, Jennie Tripp, said that a quantity of wine had been consumed the previous evening before Hewitt and his friend Tommy Lawson began fighting. Hewitt had struck her when she tried to intervene, and she did not see the blow that killed him, but later found a length of wood which she believed was the weapon used. Lawson, who was drunk when arrested the following morning, and at the inquest was put on remand for his murder.

At the trial, which was for manslaughter, the jury accepted the argument that the stick produced could not have caused the fatal injury, and if he had struck the much stronger Hewitt, it was in self-defence, so returned a verdict of "not guilty". When Hewitt was buried his dog loyally stayed by his grave. Following Hewitt's death the Ngarrindjeri observing their own laws, did not visit the site.

On 13 November 1930 a letter in the Observer by D.H. Griffin, the Mayor of Victor Harbour, emphatically held that Hewitt was not under the influence of alcohol at the time of his death. D.H. Griffin goes on to insinuate that Hewitt was murdered by being beaten to death with a hammer.
