= Jack Fletcher Jr. =

Australian rules footballer

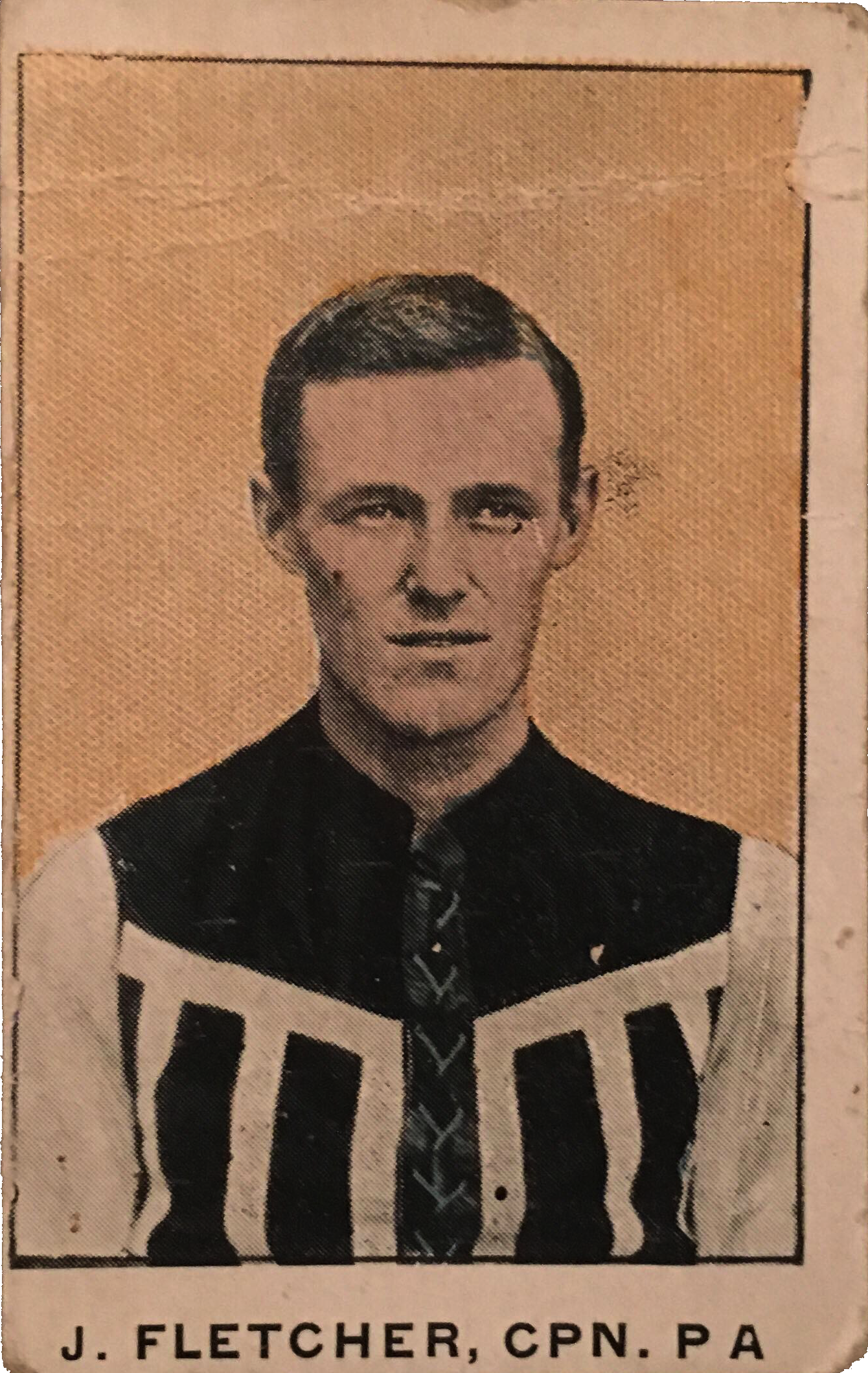

Personal information
- Full name: Jack Fletcher Jr.
- Position: Half-back

Playing career
Years	Club	Games (Goals)
1904–1908	Port Adelaide	36 (3)

Representative team honours
Years	Team	Games (Goals)
1905–1906	South Australia	3 (0)

Career highlights
- Port Adelaide captain (1906); Port Adelaide premiership player (1906)

Jack Fletcher Jr. was an Australian rules footballer for the Port Adelaide Football Club. Before becoming a footballer Fletcher was a successful inter-state Lacrosse player. After being a premiership captain with Port Adelaide in 1906, Fletcher returned to playing Lacrosse.
