= George Linklater Sr. =

Playing career
Years	Club	Games (Goals)
1892-1900	Port Adelaide	107

Career highlights
- Port Adelaide premiership player (1897); Port Adelaide best and fairest (1896)

George Linklater Sr. was an Australian rules footballer for Port Adelaide.
