= John Trait =

Australian rules umpire

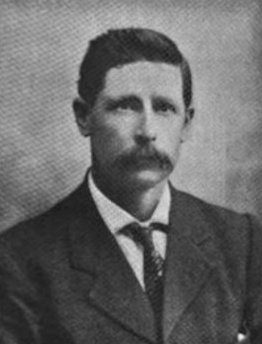

Personal information
- Full name: John Joseph Trait
- Nicknames: "Prince of Umpires", "Jack"
- Born: 29 August 1859; Geelong, Colony of Victoria
- Died: 2 November 1906 (aged 47); Geelong, Victoria, Australia

Umpiring career
Years	League	Role
1882–1895	VFA	Field Umpire

Career highlights
- 1889 SAFA Grand Final

John Joseph Trait (1859–1906) was an Australian rules umpire and is considered to be the best umpire of the code from the 19th century.

== Victorian Football Association umpire ==
Trait umpired his first game on 22 July 1882 in Geelong in a match between the Geelong and South Melbourne. Despite the travelling side losing, their captain, Mat Minchin, congratulated John Trait after the match, saying: "You are the best umpire we ever had at Geelong".

Trait was considered one of the best umpires in the Victorian Football Association, and was known as "The Prince of Umpires".

=== Demand in other states ===
Trait was regularly in demand from other states for use in important matches. He was specifically sought out and used as the umpire for the 1889 SAFA Grand Final.

=== Umpire of intercolonial matches ===
Trait would regularly be selected as the umpire of matches between Victoria and South Australia.

=== Retirement from umpiring ===
He retired from umpiring in 1895.

== Personal life ==
Trait's life was beset with many tragedies. He was widowed, and his only son and one of his four daughters also predeceased him; additionally, the financial state of his business as an aerated-water manufacturer suffered, possibly because of his extended period of poor health that required frequent medical attention. It was this illness that ultimately took Trait's life, rendering his surviving three daughters orphans.

Trait died at his home in Geelong on 2 November 1906, aged 47. Appeals from appreciative football clubs from far and wide were made in Trait's honour to help support his orphaned children. Despite his great personal tragedies, Trait was championed upon his death as being cordial and "generous to a fault" and as "a good man struggling with adversity", with his umpiring ability "only equalled by his impartiality".
