= Ernest Mucklow =

Australian rules footballer

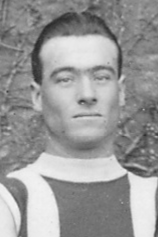

Personal information
- Full name: Ernest Warden Gordon Mucklow
- Nickname: Punch
- Born: 3 September 1898; Charleston, South Australia
- Died: 23 April 1953 (aged 54); Semaphore Park, South Australia
- Position: Wingman

Playing career
Years	Club	Games (Goals)
1920–23, 1926–35	Port Adelaide	183

Representative team honours
Years	Team	Games (Goals)
	South Australia	10

Career highlights
- 2x Port Adelaide premiership player (1921, 1928); 2x Port Adelaide best and fairest (1929, 1932)

Ernest Warden Gordon Mucklow (3 September, 1898 – 23 April, 1953) was an Australian football player. He played for Port Adelaide Football Club in the 1920s and 1930s. He also played for Victorian countryside, Dimboola, during the 1920s. Mucklow also worked as a furnaceman.

== Family ==
Ernest Mucklow was the son of William Joseph Mucklow (1865–1932) and Mary Mucklow (1863–1935), née Drewett. He was born at Charleston, South Australia on 3 September, 1898.

He married Winifred Dorothy Mazey (1900–1979) on 15 August, 1921.

== Death ==
He died (suddenly) of a coronary occlusion at Semaphore Park, South Australia on 23 April, 1953.

== See also ==
- 1927 Melbourne Carnival
