= Otway L'Estage =

Australian rules footballer

Personal information
- Full name: Otway York L'Estage
- Nicknames: Otty, Otto, Ottawa, Oscar
- Born: 1873
- Died: 27 February 1908 (aged 34–35)
- Position: Defender

Playing career
Years	Club	Games (Goals)
1894–1898	Port Adelaide	
1899–1900	Norwood	

Representative team honours
Years	Team	Games (Goals)
- South Australia

Career highlights
- Port Adelaide premiership player (1897); Port Adelaide best and fairest (1895)

Otway L'Estage was an Australian rules footballer for Port Adelaide and Norwood. He was the son of John and Mary L'Estage who were Irish immigrants from Belfast.
