= Charles Kellett =

Australian rules footballer

Playing career
Years	Club	Games (Goals)
1877–1889	Port Adelaide	133 (5)

Career highlights
- Port Adelaide premiership player (1884); Port Adelaide best & fairest (1884)

Charles Kellett was an Australian rules footballer for the South Melbourne Football Club in 1878–80. He was also a member of the club's general committee during this time. In early 1881 he moved to Sydney where he played for the East Sydney Football Club. During his time in Sydney he represented NSW against Victoria on 1 July and Bendigo Districts on 5 July. He also again represented NSW against Victoria in Sydney on 6 August. He then moved to Adelaide in 1882 where he played for Port Adelaide Football Club. He was captain of the club for two seasons in 1882 and 1885. He was also a member of the club's general committee in 1889–90.
