= Mick Donaghy =

Australian rules footballer and coach

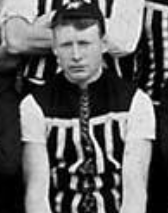

Personal information
- Full name: Michael George Donaghy
- Born: 14 November 1877; Geelong, Victoria
- Died: 31 October 1929 (aged 51); North Adelaide, South Australia
- Original team: Wellington
- Height: 193 cm (6 ft 4 in)
- Weight: 92 kg (203 lb)

Playing career^{1}
Years	Club	Games (Goals)
1898	Carlton	10 (0)
1900–1905	Geelong	80 (3)
1906–1909	Port Adelaide	52
Total		142

Representative team honours
Years	Team	Games (Goals)
	Victoria	2
	South Australia	1

Coaching career
Years	Club	Games (W–L–D)
1911	Port Adelaide	
- ^{1} Playing statistics correct to the end of 1905.

Career highlights
- Port Adelaide premiership player (1906); Port Adelaide captain (1908-1909)

Michael George Donaghy (14 November 1877 – 31 October 1929) was an Australian rules footballer who played with Carlton and Geelong in the Victorian Football League (VFL) and Port Adelaide in the South Australian Football League (SAFL).

== Carlton (1898) ==
Donaghy started his career at Carlton in 1898 but after one season returned to his home town of Geelong to play for his original club, Wellington, in 1899.

== Geelong (1900-1905) ==
He began playing for Geelong in 1900 and missed just one game in each of his first two seasons, becoming an integral member of the side. A key position player, Donaghy was known for his marking ability and was good enough to twice represent the VFL at interstate football.

== Port Adelaide (1906-1909) ==
Donaghy joined South Australian club Port Adelaide in 1906 for a four-season South Australian Football League stint and was joint club captain for the last two years. Donaghy, who also represented the South Australian interstate team, was Port Adelaide's non playing coach in 1911.

== Coaching ==
In 1911 Mick coached Port Adelaide for one season. He would take the club to the 1911 SAFL Grand Final but would lose to West Adelaide by 5 points at Adelaide Oval.

== Post-football ==
He remained with Port Adelaide as a committeeman until the war.
