= Lawrence Hodge =

Australian rules footballer

Personal information
- Full name: Lawrence Clyde Hodge
- Born: 27 May 1902; Alberton, South Australia
- Died: 6 January 1960 (aged 57)

Playing career
Years	Club	Games (Goals)
1922–1930	Port Adelaide	90 (9)

Career highlights
- Port Adelaide best & fairest (1926); Port Adelaide premiership player (1928)

Lawrence Clyde Hodge (27 May 1902 – 6 January 1960) was an Australian rules footballer and captain of the Port Adelaide Football Club during the 1920s.
