= Russell Johnston (footballer) =

Australian rules footballer

Personal information
- Full name: Russell Johnston
- Born: 10 February 1960 (age 66)
- Original team: Casterton, Victoria
- Height: 193 cm (6 ft 4 in)
- Weight: 85 kg (187 lb)
- Position: Ruckman

Playing career^{1}
Years	Club	Games (Goals)
1980	Collingwood (VFL)	8 (2)
1981–1990	Port Adelaide (SANFL)	207 (72)
Total		215 (74)

Representative team honours
Years	Team	Games (Goals)
1984–1988	South Australia	6
- ^{1} Playing statistics correct to the end of 1990.

Career highlights
- Club: 3× Port Adelaide premiership player (1981, 1989, 1990); Port Adelaide captain (1986–1990); Jack Oatey Medallist (1989); Port Adelaide best & fairest (1989); Honours: Port Adelaide's greatest team (ruckman); Port Adelaide life member (1990)

Russell Johnston (born 10 February 1960) is a former Australian rules footballer who played for Collingwood in the Victorian Football League (VFL) and Port Adelaide in the South Australian National Football League (SANFL).

== Early years ==
Russell was originally from Casterton Football Club in the Western District Football League, Victoria.

== Collingwood (1980) ==
In 1980 Johnston was recruited by Collingwood. He made his debut in Round 3 of the 1980 VFL season against Hawthorn at Princes Park. At the end of the season Johnston was delisted by Collingwood.

== Port Adelaide (1981–1990) ==
Johnston joined SANFL club Port Adelaide in 1981. A member of Port's 1981 premiership team, Johnston was appointed club captain in 1986. He missed the 1988 Grand Final win due to suspension but captained Port Adelaide to premierships the next two seasons. Johnston's performance in the 1989 Grand Final earned him a Jack Oatey Medal, to go with the Port Adelaide 'Best and Fairest' which he also won that year.

Johnston represented South Australia in six interstate matches during his career.

== Honours ==
In 2000 Johnston was named as first ruckman in Port Adelaide's official Greatest Team, which took into account all players since 1870.
