= Jason Horne-Francis =

Australian rules footballer

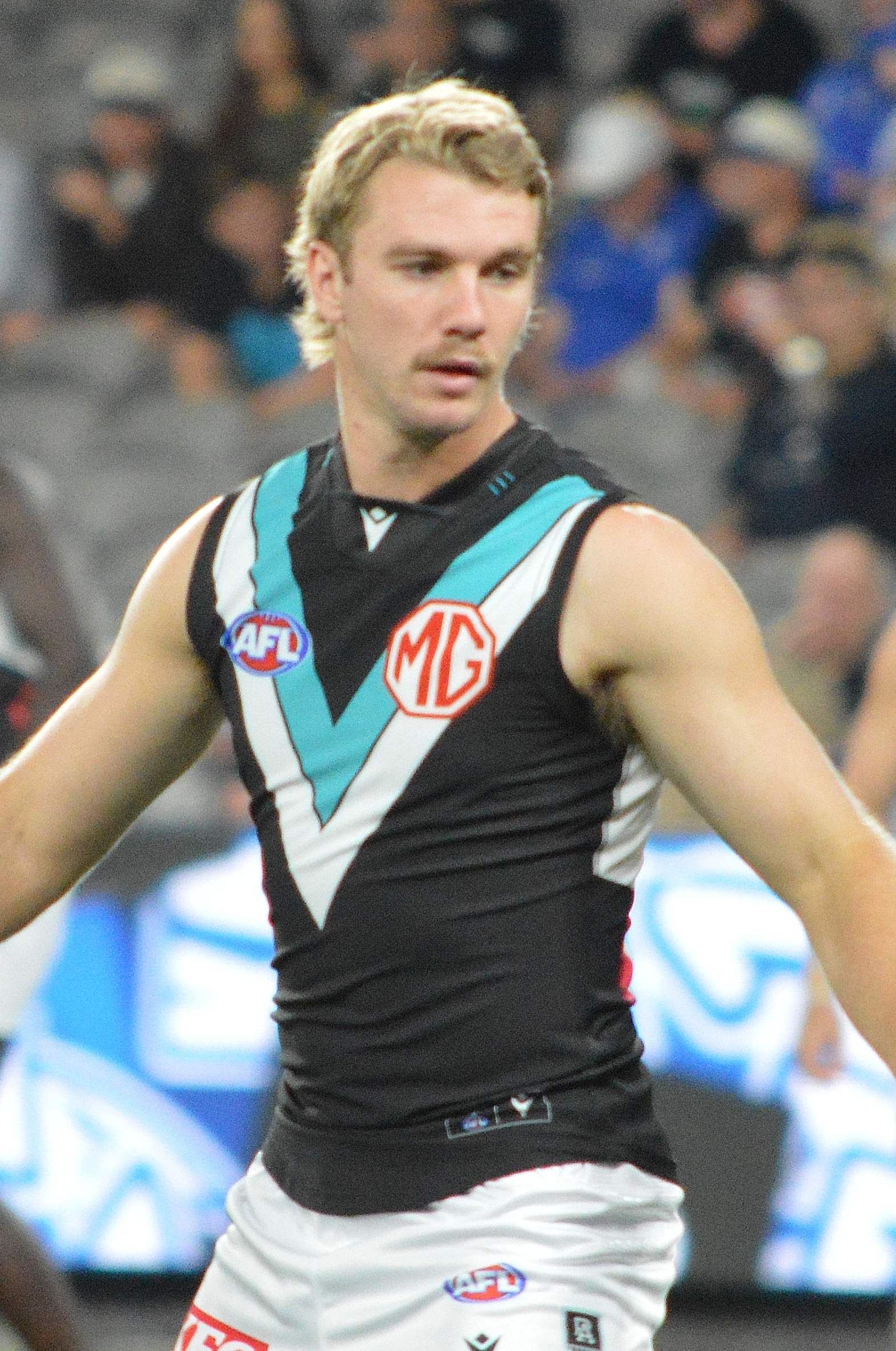
- Horne-Francis with Port Adelaide in March 2026

Personal information
- Full name: Jason Luke Horne-Francis
- Born: 21 June 2003 (age 23); South Australia
- Original team: South Adelaide (SANFL) / Christies Beach (SFL)
- Draft: No. 1, 2021 AFL draft
- Debut: Round 1, 2022, North Melbourne vs. Hawthorn, at MCG
- Height: 185 cm (6 ft 1 in)
- Weight: 85 kg (187 lb)
- Position: Midfielder

Club information
- Current club: Port Adelaide
- Number: 18

Playing career^{1}
| Years | Club | Games (Goals) |
| 2022 | North Melbourne | 17 (4) |
| 2023– | Port Adelaide | 84 (84) |
| Total | | 101 (88) |

Representative team honours
| Years | Team | Games (Goals) |
| 2025 | Indigenous All-Stars | 1 (3) |
- ^{1} Playing statistics correct to the end of 2026.

Career highlights
- John Cahill Medal: 2026; AFL Rising Star nominee: 2022; Peter Badcoe VC Medal: 2026

Jason Luke Horne-Francis (né Horne; born 21 June 2003) is a professional Australian rules footballer currently playing for the Port Adelaide Football Club in the Australian Football League, having been initially selected by the North Melbourne Football Club as the number one pick in the 2021 AFL draft.

== Early life and junior football ==
Horne-Francis was born in South Australia and raised in Adelaide. He was named the Most Valuable Player for South Australia when he captained the under-16 state team. He was also captain of the South Australian under-19 team, during which he was named in the competition's All-Australian team. He commenced playing senior-level SANFL at the age of 17, and was named best on ground in the 2021 preliminary final.

Horne-Francis played senior-level football for the South Adelaide Football Club in the South Australian National Football League and the Christies Beach Football Club in the Southern Football League.

== AFL career ==
In late 2021, Horne-Francis was the first South Australian since Bryce Gibbs (2006) to be chosen as the first pick in the national draft and just the third Indigenous player to be drafted with the first selection after Des Headland (1998) and Jamarra Ugle-Hagan (2020). Upon joining the Kangaroos, Horne-Francis had the choice of numbers 6 and 18 for his jumper, and chose 6 because the number 18 was closely associated with club legend Wayne Carey, and Horne-Francis wanted to carve his own path.

Horne-Francis played his first game in the AFL in the opening round of the 2022 season, having 13 disposals and kicking one goal on North Melbourne's narrow defeat to Hawthorn. He was part of his first victory the following week in North's 15 point victory against West Coast. In June of his first season, he was suspended by the league for two weeks for striking an opponent.

In October 2022, Horne-Francis requested a trade to Port Adelaide, the second number one draft pick after Tom Boyd to request a trade after one season. He was traded to Port Adelaide on 10 October, signing a six-year deal keeping him at Port Adelaide until 2028

In 2026, Horne-Francis won the John Cahill Medal as Port Adelaide's Best and Fairest.

== Personal life ==
Growing up, Horne-Francis supported the Fremantle Dockers. He dropped out of school in year 11 to work at the Fleurieu Milk Company; he credits this experience, as well as his stepfather's influence, with maturing him as a person. Born Jason Horne, in 2021 he added the Francis name after his stepfather, former AFL player Fabian Francis.

As an adult, Horne-Francis learned that he has Indigenous heritage through his biological father, with whom he has no contact. This connects him to the Wardaman people in the Northern Territory.

== Honours ==
=== Individual ===
- John Cahill Medalist: 2026
- Gavin Wanganeen Medal: 2023, 2024
- Peter Badcoe VC Medalist: 2026

== Statistics ==
Updated to the end of round 22, 2026.

Legend
| G | Goals | K | Kicks | D | Disposals | T | Tackles |
| B | Behinds | H | Handballs | M | Marks |

| Season | Team | No. | Games | Totals | | | | | | | Averages (per game) | | | | | | | Votes |
| Season | Team | No. | Games | G | B | K | H | D | M | T | G | B | K | H | D | M | T | Votes |
|---|---|---|---|---|---|---|---|---|---|---|---|---|---|---|---|---|---|---|
| 2022 | North Melbourne | 6 | 17 | 4 | 6 | 169 | 112 | 281 | 51 | 49 | 0.2 | 0.4 | 9.9 | 6.6 | 16.5 | 3.0 | 2.9 | 0 |
| 2023 | Port Adelaide | 18 | 24 | 16 | 12 | 268 | 154 | 422 | 78 | 69 | 0.7 | 0.5 | 11.2 | 6.4 | 17.6 | 3.3 | 2.9 | 16 |
| 2024 | Port Adelaide | 18 | 24 | 27 | 21 | 373 | 149 | 522 | 106 | 71 | 1.1 | 0.9 | 15.5 | 6.2 | 21.8 | 4.4 | 3.0 | 19 |
| 2025 | Port Adelaide | 18 | 15 | 14 | 13 | 201 | 112 | 313 | 62 | 44 | 0.9 | 0.9 | 13.4 | 7.5 | 20.9 | 4.1 | 2.9 | 10 |
| 2026 | Port Adelaide | 18 | 20 | 27 | 16 | 318 | 148 | 466 | 99 | 67 | 1.4 | 0.8 | 15.9 | 7.4 | 23.3 | 5.0 | 3.4 | 0 |
| Career | | | 100 | 88 | 68 | 1329 | 675 | 2004 | 396 | 300 | 0.9 | 0.7 | 13.3 | 6.8 | 20.0 | 4.0 | 3.0 | 45 |
