= Harry Phillips (Australian footballer) =

Australian rules footballer (1868–1923)

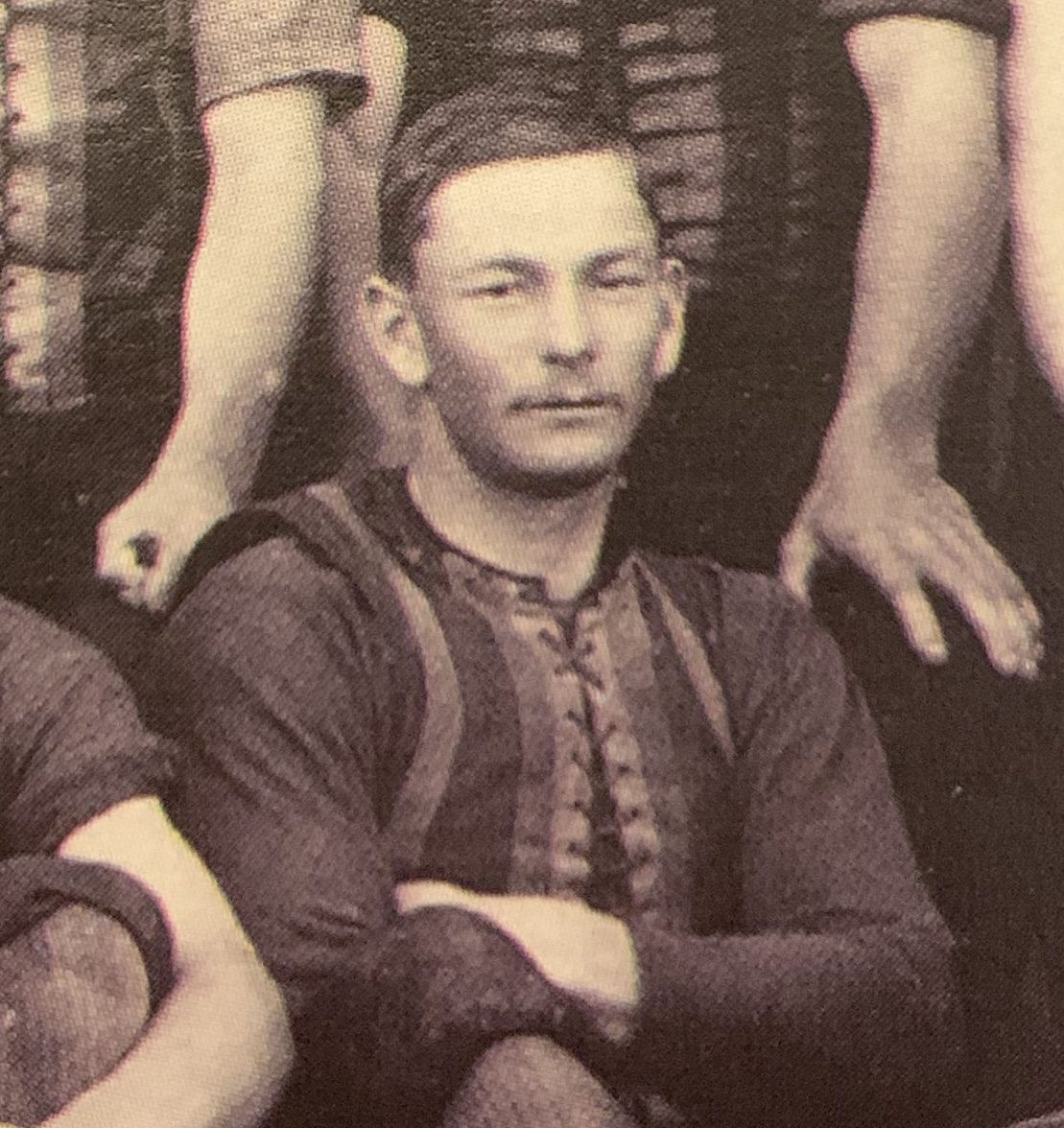
- Harry Phillips in 1893.

Personal information
- Full name: Henry Phillips
- Nickname: Tick
- Born: 21 August 1868; Queenstown, South Australia
- Died: 10 August 1923 (aged 54); Queenstown, South Australia
- Original team: Kingston
- Position: Utility

Playing career
Years	Club	Games (Goals)
1886–1900	Port Adelaide	198 (125)

Representative team honours
Years	Team	Games (Goals)
1890–1894	South Australia	5 (4)

Career highlights
- Club: Champions of Australia team member (1890); 2× Port Adelaide premiership player (1890, 1897); 4× Port Adelaide best & fairest (1888, 1891, 1892, 1893); Port Adelaide captain (1899–1900); Port Adelaide leading goalkicker (1888); South Australian Junior Association premiership player (1885).; Representative: 5 games for South Australia; Honours: Port Adelaide's greatest team (interchange)

Henry "Tick" Phillips (21 August 1868 – 10 August 1923) was an Australian footballer and champion player for Port Adelaide. He is widely considered to be the club's greatest player of the nineteenth century. Phillips played sixteen seasons for Port Adelaide. For his final two seasons, he was appointed captain.

== Junior Football ==
In his early years Phillips played football for the Kingston Football Club in the South Australian Junior Football Association. In an 1885 post season summary of Kingston, the junior leagues premiership team, a local sports columnist described Phillips football ability as "[He] plays to perfection; takes everything coolly and marks well. One of the best all round men in the team."

== Football career ==
Phillips made his debut for the Port Adelaide against South Adelaide at Alberton Oval in his club's first fixture of the 1886 SAFA season. Phillips kicked his first goal for Port Adelaide the following week against Norwood at Alberton Oval. Phillips would go on to play all of Port Adelaide's 15 games in his debut season.

In 1888 during Round 8 against Medindie at Alberton Oval, Phillips kicked 5 goals. At the end of the 1888 SAFA season, Phillips would be awarded his first Port Adelaide best and fairest.

In 1889 Phillips injured his ankle during a football trip to Victoria. He would miss a large part of the season, but would return for the club's 13th SAFA match against Medindie and kick two goals.

In 1890, Phillips was a member of Port Adelaide's victorious Championship of Australia side who defeated South Melbourne for the national title.

In 1893 a writer for the Express and Telegraph (Adelaide) wrote of Harry Phillips saying "Tick Phillips is one of the most respected and gentlemanly footballers in the colony. He is not an in-an-out player, but one who is loyal to his club and trains consistently in order that the team he plays for should have the full benefit of his abilities. He has been connected with the Ports for a good many years, and during this period has earned the goodwill of not only the supporters of the club, but those outside the magenta ranks. As a ruck player there are few his equal not only in this colony, but in Australia. He is remarkably clever, very modest in his performances, and quite unselfish Messers E and C Lazarus offered to give a trophy to the best all-round player in the team at the end of last season, and the club selected Tick as the one most deserving of the prize. Recently the trophy was presented to him with numerous good wishes for his future success."

Phillips retired at the end of 1900, with his career total of 198 games being a club record until it was broken by Ted Whelan in 1959, while his feat of winning three consecutive best and fairest awards in 1891–1893 would not be equalled until Robbie Gray did so in 2014–2016, 123 years later.

== Death ==
Harold Phillips died in Queenstown, South Australia. His funeral was attended by Norwood captain Alfred Waldron.
