= 1943 SANFL season =

- Teams: 4
- Premiers: Norwood/North Adelaide
- Minor premiers: Port Adelaide/West Torrens
- Ken Farmer Medallist: W Isaac; Norwood/North Adelaide (73 Goals)
- Highest: 36,400 (Grand Final,Norwood/North Adelaide vs. Port Adelaide/West Torrens)

The 1943 South Australian National Football League season was the second of three war-interrupted seasons. The premiership was won by Norwood-North.

The four merged teams and their training grounds were:

- Port-Torrens (Port Adelaide and West Torrens), wearing Port Adelaide colours and known as the Magpies (Alberton Oval)
- Norwood-North (Norwood and North Adelaide), wearing North Adelaide colours and known as the Redlegs (Norwood Oval)
- Sturt-South (Sturt and South Adelaide), wearing Sturt colours and known as the Blues (Unley Oval)
- West-Glenelg (West Adelaide and Glenelg), wearing Glenelg colours and known as the Tigers (Adelaide Oval)

The season was played over twelve minor rounds commencing on 15 May, followed by the major rounds played under the Page–McIntyre final four featuring all four teams.

== Ladder ==
1943 SANFL Ladder
Pos	Team	Pld	W	L	D	PF	PA	PP	Pts
1	Port-Torrens	12	10	2	0	1215	925	56.78	20
2	West-Glenelg	12	5	7	0	1107	1107	50.00	10
3	Norwood-North (P)	12	5	7	0	1004	1109	47.52	10
4	Sturt-South	12	4	8	0	1012	1197	45.81	8

Rules for classification: 1) points; 2) percentage; 3) number of points for.
