= 1942 SANFL season =

- Teams: 4
- Premiers: Port Adelaide/West Torrens
- Ken Farmer Medallist: R Reynolds; Sturt/South Adelaide (45 Goals)
- Highest: 34,000 (Grand Final, Port Adelaide/West Torrens vs. West Adelaide/Glenelg)

The 1942 South Australian National Football League season was the first of three SANFL seasons played under reduced club numbers during World War II. The premiership was won by Port-Torrens, the merger between Port Adelaide and West Torrens. Attendances during World War II were inflated due to servicemen being granted free entry.

The Pacific theatre of World War II had escalated dramatically since the 1941 season, and Australia was heavily committed to the war effort by this time, making football a secondary consideration. Many football ovals were also taken over, impacting the ability to play or train. For much of the offseason, the prospect of league football continuing in 1942 looked unlikely. Nevertheless, the Allied Forces Welfare Coordinating Committee appealed for the SANFL to stage matches for the entertainment of troops and civilians, and in late April, only two weeks prior to the start of the season, final arrangements were made for a reduced season featuring four merged teams, each representing a pair of geographically close clubs. The competing teams were:

- Port-Torrens (Port Adelaide and West Torrens), wearing Port Adelaide colours and known as the Magpies
- Norwood-North (Norwood and North Adelaide), wearing North Adelaide colours and known as the Redlegs
- Sturt-South (Sturt and South Adelaide), wearing Sturt colours and known as the Blues
- West-Glenelg (West Adelaide and Glenelg), wearing Glenelg colours and known as the Tigers

Each merged team would be jointly managed by committees of the individual clubs. The season was played over twelve minor rounds, followed by the major rounds played under the Page–McIntyre final four featuring all four teams.

== Ladder ==
1942 SANFL Ladder
Pos	Team	Pld	W	L	D	PF	PA	PP	Pts
1	Sturt-South	12	7	5	0	1345	1197	52.91	14
2	Port-Torrens	12	7	5	0	1250	1225	50.51	14
3	West-Glenelg	12	7	5	0	1238	1229	50.18	14
4	Norwood-North	12	3	9	0	1092	1274	46.15	6

Rules for classification: 1) points; 2) percentage; 3) number of points for.

== Grand Final ==
1942 SANFL Grand Final
Saturday, 19 September	Port-Torrens	def.	West-Glenelg	Adelaide Oval (crowd: 35,000)
7.2 (44); 10.6 (66); 12.12 (84); 18.12 (120)	Q1; Q2; Q3; Final	2.7 (19); 9.9 (63); 15.9 (99); 16.13 (109)	Umpires: E. J. Hine
R. McLean 6, Skelley 4, Kelleway 3, Shaw 2, Scott, Dayman, Dangerfield	Goals	Coad 4, Brock 3, Miller 2, Hender 2, Smith 2, Robjent, Summersides, Taylor
Roberts, R. McLean, Glastonbury, Thiele, Scott, Kelleway, Skelley	Best	Smith, Coad, Robjent, Hender, Miller, Crabbe, Keane
