= 1944 SANFL season =

- Teams: 4
- Premiers: Norwood/North Adelaide
- Minor premiers: Port Adelaide/West Torrens
- Ken Farmer Medallist: W. Isaac; Norwood/North Adelaide (76 goals)
- Highest: 30,000 (Grand Final,Norwood/North Adelaide vs. Port Adelaide/West Torrens)

The 1944 South Australian National Football League season was the final of three war-interrupted seasons. For the second consecutive year the premiership was won by Norwood-North who defeated the minor premiers Port Adelaide-West Torrens in the Grand Final.

== Ladder ==
1944 SANFL Ladder
Pos	Team	Pld	W	L	D	PF	PA	PP	Pts
1	Port-Torrens	12	10	2	0	1502	1158	56.47	20
2	Sturt-South	12	7	5	0	1313	1212	52.00	14
3	West-Glenelg	12	4	8	0	1050	1253	45.59	8
4	Norwood-North (P)	12	3	9	0	1126	1348	45.51	6

Rules for classification: 1) points; 2) percentage; 3) number of points for.

== Finals series ==
=== Grand Final ===
1944 SANFL Grand Final
Saturday, 30 September	Norwood–North	def.	Port–Torrens	Adelaide Oval (crowd: 30,000)
4.4 (28); 8.5 (53); 8.5 (53); 9.7 (61)	Q1; Q2; Q3; Final	2.3 (15); 6.7 (43); 7.10 (52); 7.13 (55)	Umpires: Plumstead
Isaac 3 Reilly 2 Sawley, Way, Arbon, Searle 1	Goals	Hall 2 Prior, Shaw, Hank, Fletcher, Clark 1
