= Charlie Fry =

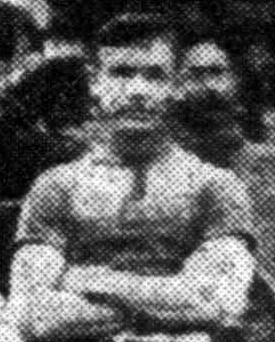
- Charlie Fry in 1884.

Personal information
- Full name: Charles Fry

Playing career
Years	Club	Games (Goals)
1884–1892	Port Adelaide	

Career highlights
- 2x Port Adelaide best & fairest (1886, 1890); 2x Port Adelaide premiership player (1884, 1890); 2x Port Adelaide leading goalkicker (1886, 1889)

Charlie Fry was an Australian rules footballer for the Port Adelaide Football Club.

== Football ==
He was a member of Port Adelaide's first premiership team in 1884.

== Personal life ==
Charlie's brother James also played for Port Adelaide.
