= Albert Hollingworth =

Australian rules footballer

Personal information
- Full name: Albert Edward Hollingworth
- Born: 16 August 1910; Rosewater, South Australia
- Died: 1 October 1968 (aged 58); Woodville, South Australia
- Position: Centre half-forward

Playing career
Years	Club	Games (Goals)
1934–1940	Port Adelaide	91 (193)

Representative team honours
Years	Team	Games (Goals)
1935, 1937–38	South Australia	6

Career highlights
- 3x Port Adelaide premiership player (1936, 1937, 1939); 2x Port Adelaide best and fairest (1934, 1936); Port Adelaide leading goal kicker (1938)

Albert Edward Hollingworth (16 August 1910 – 1 October 1968) was an Australian rules footballer for the Port Adelaide Football Club in the 1930s.

Hollingworth was a strong marking, long kicking centre half forward who made his league debut in 1934, and enjoyed a very successful season which earned him the club’s best and fairest award. His inaccurate shooting for goal, however, yielding a tally of 4.7, was a factor in Port Adelaide's grand final loss that year.

Hollingworth won another club best and fairest award in 1936, and, after being moved to full forward following Jack Prideaux’s retirement, he topped the Magpies' goal-kicking list in 1938 with 45 goals and in 1939 with 78. A South Australian interstate representative on half a dozen occasions, including both matches at the 1937 Perth carnival, he played a total of 105 league games including five Grand Finals.
