= Ned Hender =

Australian rules footballer

Personal information
- Full name: Ned Hender
- Position: Rover

Playing career
Years	Club	Games (Goals)
1931–40	Port Adelaide	166 (344)
1941, 1945–46	Glenelg	47 (79)
1942–1944	Glenelg–West Adelaide	

Representative team honours
Years	Team	Games (Goals)
	South Australia	25

Career highlights
- 3× Port Adelaide premiership player (1936, 1937, 1939); 2× Port Adelaide leading goal-kicker (1932, 1933); Glenelg joint leading goal-kicker (1946); Port Adelaide captain (1938); West Adelaide–Glenelg captain (1942); South Australia captain (1938); SANFL Hall of Fame inductee (2002); SANFL life member (player)

Ned Hender was an Australian rules footballer from South Australia. He played for the Port Adelaide Football Club during the 1930s, winning three South Australian National Football League (SANFL) premierships in 1936, 1937 and 1939. After 1940 he played for the Glenelg Football Club, captaining the temporarily merged West Adelaide–Glenelg side in 1942. He also captained Port Adelaide and the South Australian side in 1938.
