= Jack Dermody =

Australian rules footballer, born 1910

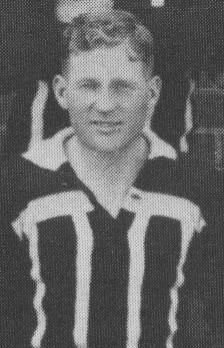

Personal information
- Full name: John Dermody
- Born: 1 September 1910
- Died: 9 April 1990 (aged 79)
- Original team: Kapunda
- Position: Utility

Playing career
| Years | Club | Games (Goals) |
| 1932–1938 | Port Adelaide | 109 (10) |

Representative team honours
| Years | Team | Games (Goals) |
| | South Australia | 16 |

Career highlights
- 2× Port Adelaide premiership player (1936, 1937); 2× Port Adelaide best and fairest (1933, 1935); Port Adelaide captain (1936–1937)

John Dermody (1 September 1910 – 9 April 1990) was an Australian rules footballer from Kapunda, South Australia. He captained the Port Adelaide Football Club to back-to-back premierships in 1936 and 1937.

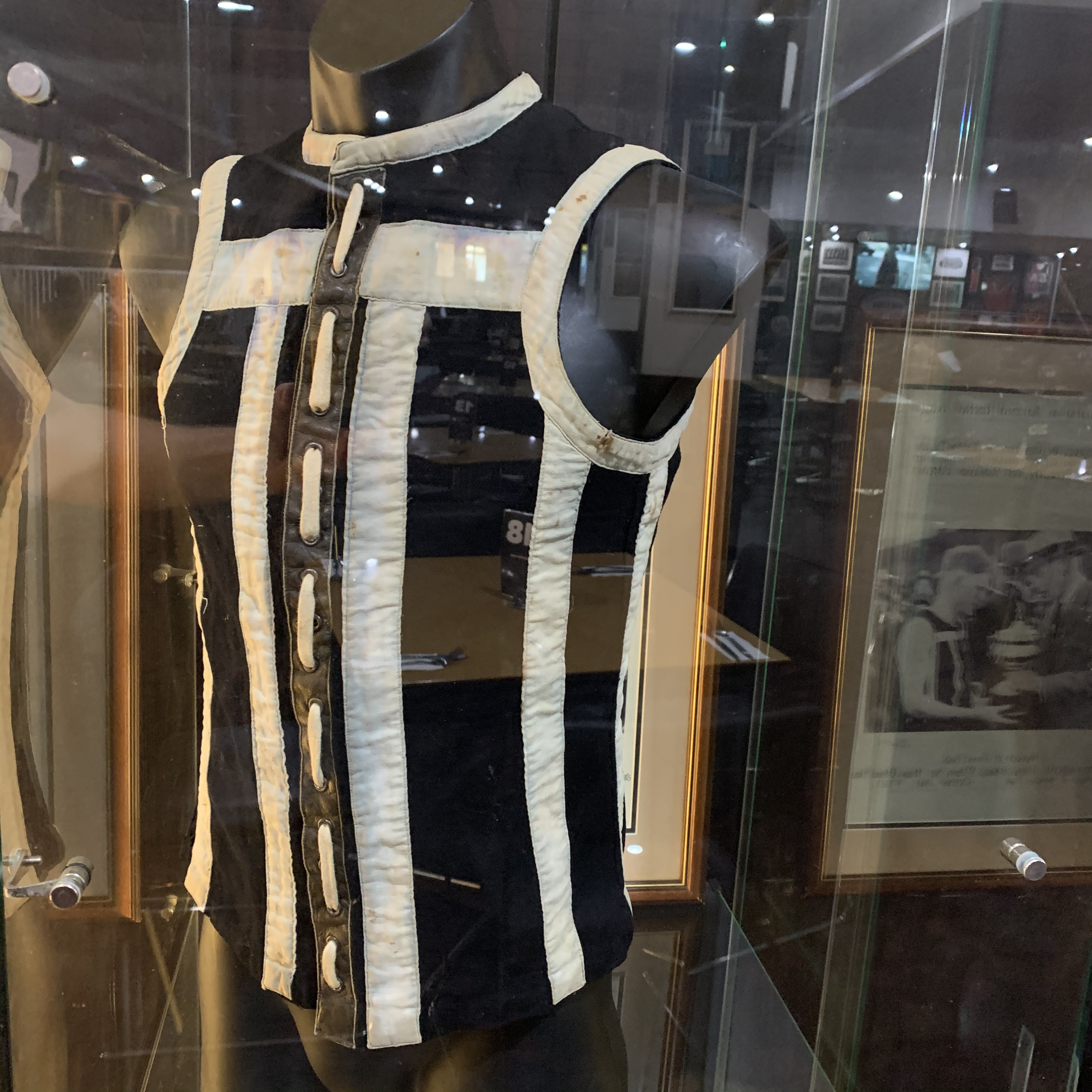
Dermody's guernsey from the 1930s on display at Alberton Oval.
