= Stephen Clifford =

Australian rules footballer

Personal information
- Born: 18 September 1956 (age 70)
- Original team: Banyule

Playing career^{1}
Years	Club	Games (Goals)
1973–1978	Collingwood (VFL)	38 (13)
1978–1986	Port Adelaide (SANFL)	162 (174)
Total		200 (187)
- ^{1} Playing statistics correct to the end of 1986.

Career highlights
- Gardiner Medal 1974; 3-times Port Adelaide premiership player: 1979, 1980 & 1981; Best & Fairest Port Adelaide: 1978, 1980 & 1983

Stephen "Bomber" Clifford (born 18 September 1956) is a former Australian rules footballer in the South Australian National Football League (SANFL), playing for the Port Adelaide Football Club and in the Victorian Football League (VFL), playing for the Collingwood Football Club.

Clifford made his senior VFL debut for Collingwood as a 16-year-old in 1973, won the Gardiner Medal for Best and Fairest player in the VFL reserves the next season but could only amass 38 senior games for Collingwood until 1978.

Recruited by SANFL club Port Adelaide early in the 1978 season, Clifford immediately starred, winning the first of his three club Best and Fairests that year. Clifford played in Port Adelaide's premiership teams of 1979, 1980, and 1981 - each of these years corresponding to a Collingwood grand final loss.

Clifford won further best & fairest awards in 1980 and 1983. While Clifford may be less remembered than other higher-profile Port players of his era, the fact that he won three club best and fairest awards over a six-year period is testament to his talent and consistency.
