= John Humphreys (cricketer) =

Australian cricketer

Personal information
- Full name: John Humphreys
- Source: ESPNcricinfo, 1 January 2017

John Humphreys was an Australian cricketer. He played one first-class match for New South Wales in 1875/76.

== See also ==
- List of New South Wales representative cricketers
