= Thomas Smith (Australian footballer) =

Australian rules footballer (1851–1909)

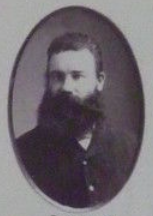

Personal information
- Full name: Thomas George Smith
- Nickname: TG
- Born: 1851; Woolwich, England
- Died: 16 December 1909 (age 60)

Playing career
Years	Club	Games (Goals)
1870–1876	Port Adelaide (Interclub)	31
1877–1881	Port Adelaide (SAFA)	69
Total		100

Career highlights
- 3x Port Adelaide best and fairest (1877, 1878, 1879)

Thomas George Smith (1851 – 16 December 1909) was an Australian football player. He was a foundation player of the Port Adelaide Football Club in 1870 and was also an inaugural player in the club's first SAFA season. During the first three seasons of the SAFA, he won Port Adelaide's best and fairest award.

== Early life ==
Thomas Smith was born in 1851 in Woolwich, England. His family brought him to Australia when he was three years old.

== Football ==
Smith was arguably the first star player for the Port Adelaide Football Club. He won three consecutive best and fairest for Port Adelaide during the first three years of the South Australian Football Association (later SANFL) from 1877 to 1879.

On 29 May 1885 a football match on Adelaide Oval was organised by the SAFA between an All-Indigenous team captained by Harry Hewitt and a combined team selected by the then retired Smith, composed of players from Port Juniors, LeFevre Peninsula, Fitzroy and Kingston Football Clubs. The match was very close and ended in a draw.

== Later life ==
Smith worked as a tailor on Commercial Road, Port Adelaide.

== Personal life ==
Thomas Smith was a cousin to Australian artist Mortimer Menpes.
