= Lew Roberts =

Australian rules footballer, executive

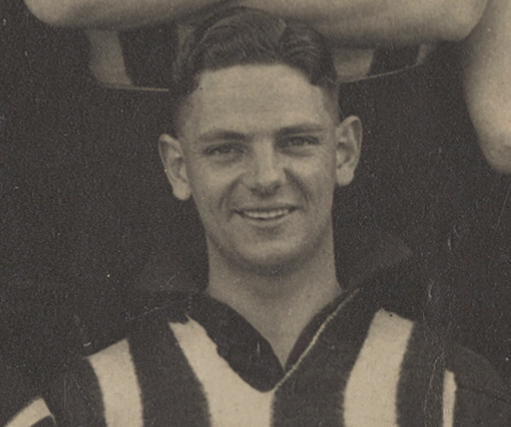

Personal information
- Full name: Lewis Edgar Roberts
- Born: 2 April 1918; Evandale, South Australia
- Died: 3 March 2001 (aged 82)
- Position: Centre

Playing career^{1}
Years	Club	Games (Goals)
1937–1941	Port Adelaide	
1942–1944	Port Adelaide/West Torrens	
1945–1948	Port Adelaide	
Total		179 (50)

Representative team honours
Years	Team	Games (Goals)
	South Australia	6

Coaching career
Years	Club	Games (W–L–D)
1948	Port Adelaide	17 (4–13–0)
- ^{1} Playing statistics correct to the end of 1948.

Career highlights
- Port Adelaide best and fairest (1946); Port Adelaide/West Torrens captain (1942–1944); Port Adelaide captain-coach (1948); Port Adelaide hall of fame inductee

Lewis Edgar Roberts (2 April 1918 – 3 March 2001), known as Lew Roberts, was an Australian rules footballer, railwayman and businessman, known as a noted player for the Port Adelaide Football Club in the South Australian National Football League (SANFL).

== Early life ==
Roberts was born in the Adelaide suburb of Evandale, into a family that lived in the country township of Dublin, South Australia. He attended Adelaide High School.

== Football career ==
Roberts began his football career with Port Adelaide in 1937, aged 19. He captained the club during the SANFL's wartime competition from 1942 to 1944. He won the club's best and fairest award in 1946.

In 1948, Roberts again took the captaincy of the club along with coaching responsibilities in what was his last year playing for the club. His ability to kick the ball accurately to advantageous positions for his team mates was a notable part of his game.

== Railway and business career ==
After beginning his working life as a junior porter in a South Australian Railways carriage shed, Roberts progressed to performing the exacting tasks of a train controller. In 1949, he joined the Silverton Tramway Company as traffic superintendent and in 1952 he was appointed general manager of the company, a position he held until 1971. In the latter capacity, he oversaw the restructure and dieselisation of the 58-kilometre (36-mile) railway operated by the company between Broken Hill and Burns, New South Wales, and in the 1960s the creation of four subsidiaries.

In 1972, in the wake of the closure of the tramway and its replacement by a government-operated standard gauge line two years earlier, Roberts became corporate managing director of the renamed Silverton Limited and its subsidiaries. Under his leadership the company, still headquartered in Melbourne, continued mine shunting in Broken Hill and began working on property development and rail construction projects around Australia.

== Personal life ==
Following Roberts's move to Broken Hill to further his career as a railway executive, he continued his sporting interests as chairman of the Broken Hill Football League. He also became chairman of the Barrier District Cricket League, and vice president of the Broken Hill Golf Club. In his retirement he wrote a comprehensive history of the Silverton Tramway Company.
