= Ted Strawns =

Australian rules footballer

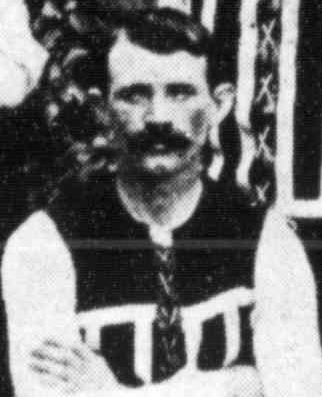

Personal information
- Full name: Edward Strawns
- Born: Circa 1881
- Died: 19 September 1958 (aged 76); Rosewater

Playing career
Years	Club	Games (Goals)
1900–1909	Port Adelaide	125

Career highlights
- 2× Port Adelaide premiership player (1903, 1906)

Ted Strawns (Circa 1881 – 19 September 1958) was an Australian rules footballer for Port Adelaide.
