= Lewis Corston =

Australian rules footballer

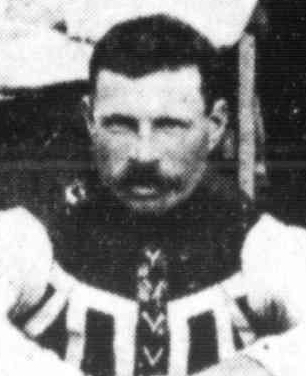

Personal information
- Full name: Lewis T. Corston
- Nickname: Nicky
- Born: 12 July 1876
- Died: 4 June 1931 (aged 54)

Playing career
Years	Club	Games (Goals)
1900	North Adelaide	5 (0)
1896–1908	Port Adelaide	

Career highlights
- 3× Port Adelaide premiership player (1897, 1903, 1906)

Lewis Corston (12 July 1876 – 4 June 1931) was an Australian rules footballer for Port Adelaide and North Adelaide. He was made captain of Port Adelaide at the end of 1906 and for the 1907 season.
