= Alf Miers =

Australian rules footballer

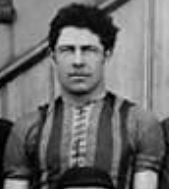

Personal information
- Full name: Alfred Gore Miers
- Born: 26 May 1869; Port Elliot, South Australia
- Died: 23 September 1944 (aged 75); North Adelaide, South Australia

Playing career
Years	Club	Games (Goals)
1888–1901	Port Adelaide	150

Career highlights
- 2× Port Adelaide premiership player (1890, 1897)

Alfred Gore Miers (26 May 1869 – 23 September 1944) was an Australian rules footballer for the Port Adelaide Football Club.
