= 1906 SAFA Grand Final =

Port Adelaide	North Adelaide
8.12 (60)	5.9 (39)
	1	2	3	4
PTA	1.3 (9)	6.8 (44)	7.8 (50)	8.12 (60)
NTH	1.2 (8)	2.2 (14)	5.7 (37)	5.9 (39)
- Date: Saturday, 15 September
- Stadium: Adelaide Oval
- Attendance: 20,000

The 1906 SAFA Grand Final was an Australian rules football competition. The match, attended by 20,000 spectators, was won by Port Adelaide who defeated North Adelaide in a Challenge Final under the Argus finals system by a margin of 21 points, marking the clubs fifth premiership victory.

== Background ==
During the 1906 SAFA season Port Adelaide finished the minor round on the top of the SAFA league ladder. However, they lost North Adelaide who finished in third place in the first week of the finals. North Adelaide then defeated Norwood (who had finished in second place) in the second week of finals. Under the Argus finals system in place since 1902, Port Adelaide had the right to challenge the winner of the major round North Adelaide in a "grand final" for the premiership.
