= Victor Johnson (footballer) =

Australian rules footballer

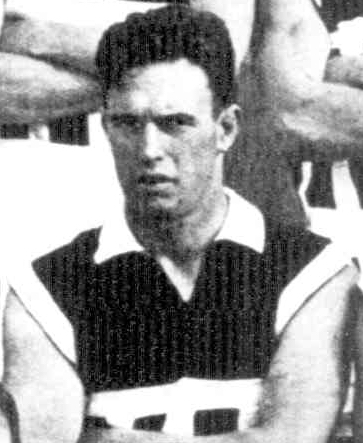

Personal information
- Position: Ruckman

Playing career^{1}
Years	Club	Games (Goals)
1923–1934*	Port Adelaide	147

Representative team honours
Years	Team	Games (Goals)
	South Australia	13

Coaching career
Years	Club	Games (W–L–D)
1932	Lefroy	
1935–1936	South Adelaide	
- ^{1} Playing statistics correct to the end of 1935.

Career highlights
- South Australian Football Hall of Fame (Inducted 2004); Port Adelaide premiership player (1928); South Adelaide premiership coach (1935); 2× South Australia captain (1931, 1933); Port Adelaide captain (1928-1931, 1934)

Victor Johnson was an Australian rules footballer from South Australia. He captained the 1928 Port Adelaide premiership. He also coached South Adelaide to a premiership in 1935. As a journalist working for the Sunday Mail (Adelaide) he noted how speed was changing how the game was being played.

== See also ==
- 1927 Melbourne Carnival
