= Allan Reval =

Australian rules footballer, born 1913

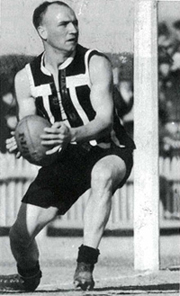

Personal information
- Full name: Allan R. V. Reval
- Nickname: Bull
- Born: 29 March 1913; South Australia
- Died: 3 April 2005 (aged 92)
- Position: Ruck rover

Playing career^{1}
Years	Club	Games (Goals)
1932–1945	Port Adelaide	187 (79)

Representative team honours^{2}
Years	Team	Games (Goals)
1934–1939	South Australia	13 (5)

Coaching career^{3}
Years	Club	Games (W–L–D)
1940–1941	Port Adelaide	37 (25–11–1)
1949	Glenelg	17 (8–9–0)
- ^{1} Playing statistics correct to the end of 1945.^{2} Representative statistics correct as of 1939.^{3} Coaching statistics correct as of 1949.

Career highlights
- Club: 3× Port Adelaide premiership player (1936, 1937, 1939); Port Adelaide best and fairest (1939); Honours: Port Adelaide life member (1944); SANFL life member; SANFL Hall of Fame inductee (2004); Port Adelaide Hall of Fame 1998; Port Adelaide "Greatest Team of the Greatest Club" member 2000

Allan "Bull" Reval (29 March 1913 – 3 April 2005) was an Australian rules footballer who played for the Port Adelaide Football Club in the South Australian National Football League (SANFL). He also coached Port Adelaide and fellow SANFL club Glenelg Football Club. He worked as a journalist for the Sunday Mail in Adelaide.

Haydn Bunton Sr., triple Brownlow and Sandover medalist, said of Allan Reval that "Of the South Australians played against, two stand out. As far as I am concerned— 'Bull' Reval and Bob Quinn. I never saw Reval play anything but well against Victoria. He was a beauty."
