= 1897 SAFA season =

1897 SAFA premiership season
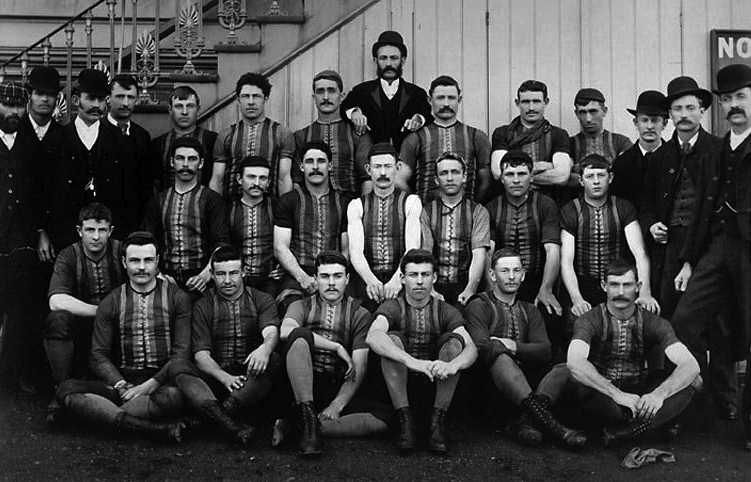
- Port Adelaide, premiers
- Teams: 6
- Premiers: Port Adelaide; 3rd premiership
- Leading goalkicker: Jimmy Tompkins; Port Adelaide (27 Goals)
- Matches played: 51

The 1897 South Australian Football Association season was the 21st edition of the top level of Australian rules football to be played in South Australia. Port Adelaide won its 3rd premiership.

In winning the 1897 SAFA premiership, Port Adelaide achieved the rare feat of going from last the previous year to first.

== Introduction of Electorate District Zoning and other Changes ==
1897 saw a number of changes, firstly District Electoral football based on the State Electoral Districts was introduced optionally with the aim of zoning players to a SAFA club (and became compulsory in 1899) and secondly was the first season of football in South Australia where behinds contributed to the total score, not just goals, which brought it in to line with the VFA.

The Port Natives club accepted the West Torrens Electoral District Zone and informed the SAFA at a meeting on Monday 26 Oct 1896 that they were changing their name to West Torrens. Of the three remaining Zones (East Adelaide, West Adelaide and Sturt) South Adelaide accepted the Electoral Zone of East Adelaide.

On 5 April 1897, The Association approved the application of the West Adelaide Football Club from the Suburban Association to join the SAFA. Their application was approved by 6 votes to 4 against and The Native Football Club (1895–1896) altered its name to West Torrens Football Club,.

Despite the constitution allowing 8 clubs based on the Electoral Districts the Association comprised six clubs until the turn of the century with the Sturt and Barossa (Gawler) Electoral zones remaining vacant.

== Ladder ==
1897 SAFA Ladder
Pos	Team	Pld	W	L	D	PF	PA	PP	Pts
1	Port Adelaide (P)	17	14	2	1	782	294	72.68	29
2	South Adelaide	17	13	4	0	1050	391	72.87	26
3	Norwood	17	11	5	1	765	402	65.55	23
4	North Adelaide	17	7	10	0	535	609	46.77	14
5	West Torrens	17	3	13	1	257	1091	19.07	7 (Note: The Round 19 match between West Torrens and West Adelaide at Kensington Oval was abandoned as a draw at quarter time after torrential rain flooded the ground (scores at the time were West Torrens 1 goal 1 behind to West Adelaide 1 goal).)
6	West Adelaide	17	1	15	1	217	828	20.77	3

Rules for classification: 1) points; 2) percentage; 3) number of points for.
Notes:

Program notes - Norwood, Port Adelaide and South Adelaide played each other 4 times, and the other 3 clubs 3 times.
North Adelaide, West Adelaide and West Torrens played each other 4 times, and the other 3 clubs 3 times.
