= Alexander McKenzie (footballer) =

Australian rules footballer

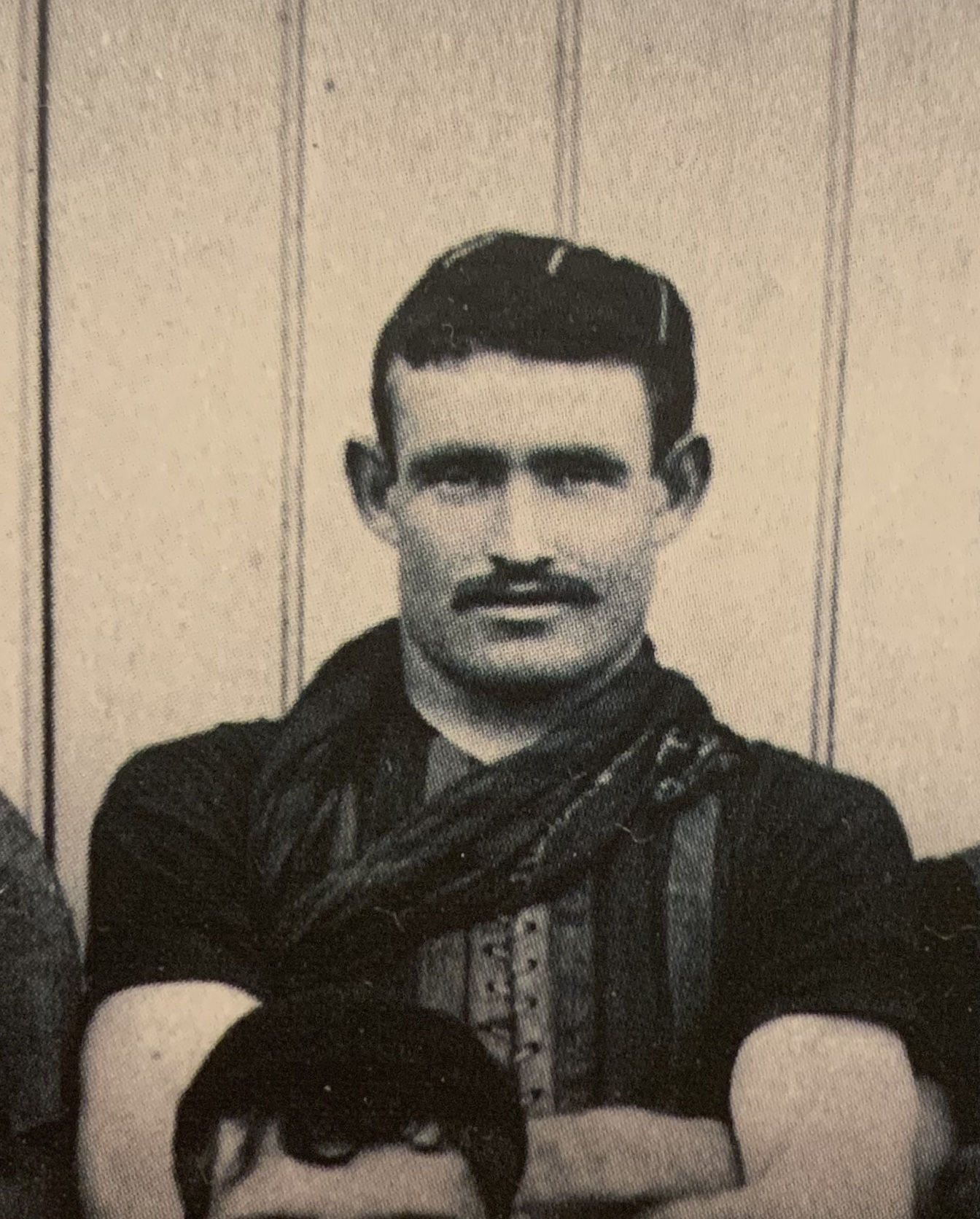
- Alexander McKenzie with Port Adelaide in 1893.

Personal information
- Full name: Alexander Malcolm McKenzie
- Nicknames: Alec, Alick, Mac
- Born: 7 September 1870; Sellicks Hill, South Australia
- Died: 25 September 1914 (aged 44); South Africa
- Height: 183 cm (6 ft 0 in)
- Weight: 83 kg (183 lb)
- Position: Forward

Playing career
Years	Club	Games (Goals)
1889, 1891–1895	Port Adelaide (SANFL)	80 (192)
1890	Adelaide (SANFL)	5 (7)
1896	Imperials (WAFL)	4 (9)
1896	Coolgardie	2 (4)
1897	Kalgoorlie City (GFL)	10 (27)
Total		102 (239)

Representative team honours
Years	Team	Games (Goals)
1892–1894	South Australia	2 (2)

Career highlights
- 4x Port Adelaide leading goalkicker (1892, 1893, 1894, 1895); Kalgoorlie City premiership player (1897); Goldfields Football League leading goalkicker (1897)

Alexander McKenzie was an Australian rules footballer for Port Adelaide. He was noted to be able to kick a football 75 yards without the assistance of wind.

== Port Adelaide (1889) ==
In the lead up to the 1889 SAFA season a football reporter writing under the pseudonym 'Centre' for the Port Adelaide News forecasted that "A. McKenzie (as I have mentioned before) and P. Begg have indications of making really first class players. When the Association matches start I think the Port club will have a team that will stand a lot of knocking about, and also take a lot to beat". McKenzie made his debut in the first game of the 1889 SAFA season in a win against Medindie (North Adelaide) on Alberton Oval with 'Goalpost' writing for the Evening Journal commenting on Alexander's likeness to his brother John stating that "McKenzie has his brothers style, both marking and kicking well".

During 1889 the North Melbourne Football Club visited South Australia and played a game on the Adelaide Oval against Port Adelaide. Star forward Charlie Fry was a late withdrawal for the game allowing then rookie Alex McKenzie to be named as a late inclusion for the match. McKenzie kicked a goal in Port Adelaide's six goal defeat of North Melbourne.

== Adelaide (1890) ==
During the 1890 SAFA season McKenzie's older brother John, who also played as a key position forward, was keeping Alexander out of the Port Adelaide side. As a result, Alexander McKenzie moved to the Adelaide Football Club halfway though the season to seek greater opportunities to play as a key forward. Alexander's best game for Adelaide was in a game against Medindie (North Adelaide) where he kicked three goals in a two-goal win on Adelaide Oval. At the time Adelaide were struggling and at the beginning of the 1891 season John prematurely flagged his retirement thus enticing his brother Alex back to Port Adelaide.

== Port Adelaide (1891–1895) ==
McKenzie's move back to his original club proved a good decision as he would go on to lead that clubs goal-kicking four times in 1892, 1893, 1894 and 1895.

In 1892 McKenzie was selected in the South Australian state side for the first time. During the match against Victoria on the Melbourne Cricket Ground Alexander kicked two goals.

In a game against Adelaide on Alberton Oval during the 1893 SAFA season Alexander McKenzie kicked 13 goals.

== Western Australia (1896–1900) ==
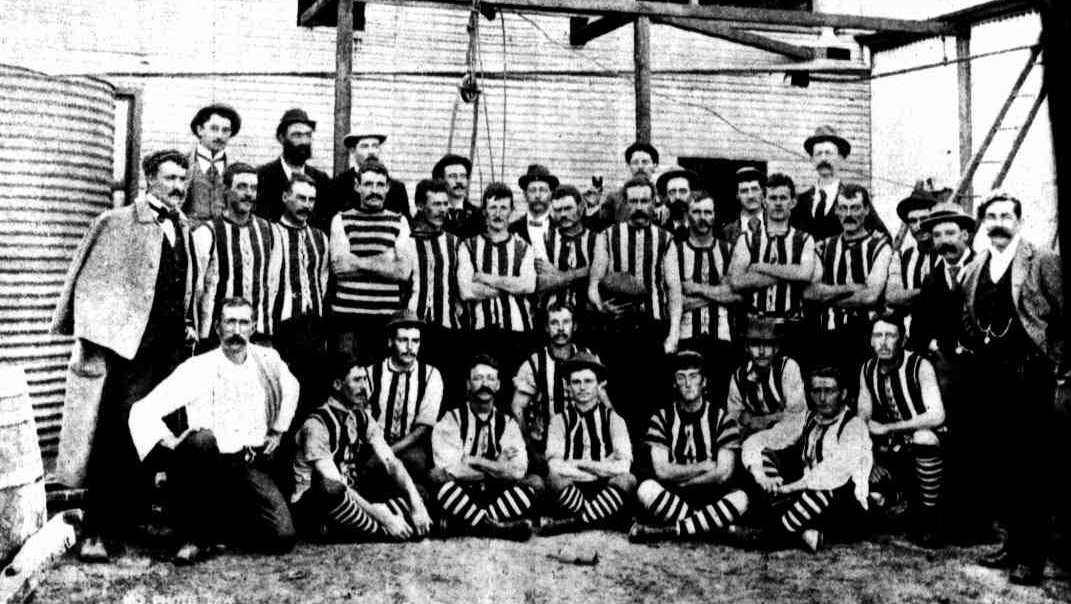
In 1897 Alexander McKenzie (pictured wearing horizontal stripes) won a premiership with the Hannans Football Club which was later renamed as Kalgoorlie City Football Club.

In 1896 McKenzie moved to the Western Australian Goldfields likely drawn by that states gold rush. During June and July 1896 McKenzie appeared for the Imperials Football Club (a club which later disbanded with the majority of players forming the East Fremantle Football Club) in the Western Australian Football Association, kicking four goals in his first game against the Rovers on the WACA.

By August 1896 Alexander McKenzie had moved to the goldfields and began playing football and cricket for Coolgardie. In 1897 McKenzie won a premiership with Kalgoorlie City. That year he led the Goldfields Football League goal kicking with 27 majors. In 1898 McKenzie had retired as a player and helped umpire the Goldfields Football League.

In 1900 McKenzie won first prize in the W.A. Tattersalls Ballarat Charles Sweep netting £1,098. McKenzie used this windfall to relocate to South Africa.

== Move to South Africa ==
In 1902 Alexander McKenzie had made it to South Africa and was in Johannesburg. By 1913 Alexander McKenzie was running a hotel in Johannesburg.

== Personal life ==
McKenzie had four brothers – Rod, Duncan, Ken and Jack; the latter two played for Port Adelaide with Alexander. Alexander married Edith Jane Lloyd and fathered two girls, Maisie Jessie McKenzie and Lorna Jean McKenzie. McKenzie died on 25 September 1914 in South Africa.
