= 1892 SAFA season =

1892 SAFA premiership season
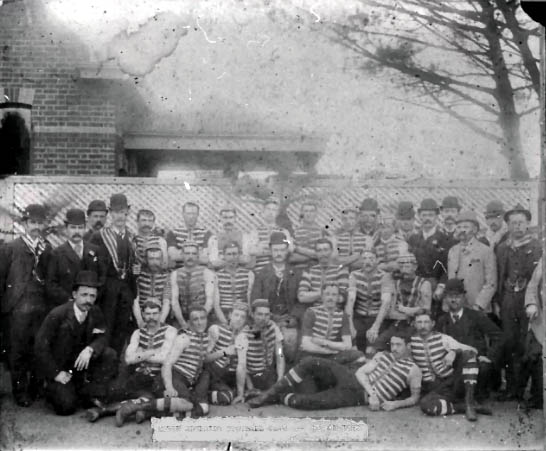
- South Adelaide, premiers
- Teams: 5
- Premiers: South Adelaide; 3rd premiership
- Matches played: 40
- Highest: 12,000 (20 June, Norwood vs. Port Adelaide)

The 1892 South Australian Football Association season was the 16th season of the top-level Australian rules football competition in South Australia.

South Adelaide won their third premiership in what was an unbalanced competition with two of the five clubs (Adelaide and Medindie) being unable to compete with the three larger clubs.

== Teams ==
Senior Clubs for 1892 Season
Adelaide	Medindie	Norwood	Port Adelaide	South Adelaide

== South Adelaide Premiership Team 1892 ==
J. Reedman (captain), W. Bushby (vice-captain), W. Anderson (committee), S. Shepherd (committee), A. Ramsay (committee), A. Hamon (committee), G. Rowley, A. Goode, A. Bushby, T. Cook, R. Dawe, A. Dawes, F.A. Fischer, R. Hancock, E. Jones, J. Kay, A. Marlow, E. Merrigan, E. Monck, A. Rimes, S. Reedman, J. Scott, J.J. Walkley, E. Chaplin, A. Cudmore, A.E. Rossiter (all players).

Hon C.C. Kingston MP (president), W.G. Coombs (chairman), J. Maddern (secretary), F. Marlow (treasurer) and J. Coppinger (trainer).

== Premiership season ==
=== Round 1 ===
	Round 1
Saturday, 7 May	Port Adelaide 5.6 (5)	def.	Medindie 3.2 (3)	Adelaide Oval
Saturday, 7 May	South Adelaide 21.18 (21)	def.	Adelaide 0.0 (0)	Kensington Oval
	Bye; Norwood

=== Round 2 ===
	Round 2
Saturday, 14 May	Norwood 15.16 (15)	def.	Adelaide 1.2 (1)	Adelaide Oval
Saturday, 14 May	Port Adelaide 4.2 (4)	drew with	South Adelaide 4.8 (4)	Alberton Oval (crowd: 2,500)
	Bye; Medindie

=== Round 3 ===
	Round 3
Saturday, 21 May	Norwood 8.7 (8)	def. by	Port Adelaide 9.5 (9)	Kensington Oval (crowd: 4,000)
Saturday, 21 May	South Adelaide 11.18 (11)	def.	Medindie 2.2 (2)	Adelaide Oval
	Bye; Adelaide

=== Round 4 (Queen’s Birthday) ===
	Round 4
Tuesday, 24 May	Medindie 6.8 (6)	def.	Adelaide 3.2 (3)	Adelaide Oval
	Bye; Norwood, Port Adelaide, South Adelaide

=== Round 5 ===
	Round 5
Saturday, 28 May	Norwood 5.7 (5)	def.	Medindie 4.1 (4)	Adelaide Oval
Saturday, 28 May	Port Adelaide 12.15 (12)	def.	Adelaide 0.1 (0)	Alberton Oval
	Bye; South Adelaide

=== Round 6 ===
	Round 6
Saturday, 4 June	Adelaide 0.3 (0)	def. by	South Adelaide 7.13 (7)	Adelaide Oval
Saturday, 4 June	Port Adelaide 15.8 (15)	def.	Medindie 5.0 (5)	Alberton Oval
	Bye; Norwood

=== Round 7 ===
	Round 7
Saturday, 11 June	South Adelaide 10.17 (10)	def.	Port Adelaide 1.3 (1)	Adelaide Oval (crowd: 6,000)
Saturday, 11 June	Norwood 13.23 (13)	def.	Medindie 2.4 (2)	Kensington Oval
	Bye; Adelaide

=== Round 8 ===
	Round 8
Monday, 20 June	Norwood 2.11 (2)	def. by	Port Adelaide 3.14 (3)	Adelaide Oval (crowd: 12,000)
Monday, 20 June	South Adelaide	def.	Adelaide	Kensington Oval
	Bye; Medindie
Adelaide forfeited their game against South Adelaide

=== Round 9 ===
	Round 9
Saturday, 2 July	Port Adelaide 16.21 (16)	def.	Adelaide 2.1 (2)	Alberton Oval
Saturday, 2 July	South Adelaide 10.22 (10)	def.	Medindie 1.4 (1)	Adelaide Oval
	Bye; Norwood

=== Round 10 ===
	Round 10
Saturday, 9 July	Norwood 4.6 (4)	def. by	South Adelaide 7.2 (7)	Adelaide Oval
Saturday, 9 July	Port Adelaide 9.13 (9)	def.	Medindie 1.7 (1)	Alberton Oval
	Bye; Adelaide

=== Round 11 ===
	Round 11
Saturday, 16 July	South Adelaide 27.23 (27)	def.	Adelaide 0.3 (0)	Adelaide Oval
Saturday, 16 July	Norwood 18.23 (18)	def.	Medindie 0.0 (0)	Kensington Oval
	Bye; Port Adelaide

=== Round 12 ===
	Round 12
Saturday, 23 July	South Adelaide 4.6 (4)	def.	Port Adelaide 3.3 (3)	Adelaide Oval (crowd: 8,000)
Saturday, 23 July	Norwood	def.	Adelaide	Kensington Oval
	Bye; Medindie
Adelaide forfeited their game against Norwood

=== Round 13 ===
	Round 13
Saturday, 30 July	South Adelaide 9.8 (9)	def.	Norwood 7.1 (7)	Kensington Oval
Saturday, 30 July	Port Adelaide 10.12 (10)	def.	Medindie 0.1 (0)	Adelaide Oval
	Bye; Adelaide

=== Round 14 ===
	Round 14
Saturday, 6 August	Norwood 5.5 (5)	def.	Port Adelaide 2.6 (2)	Adelaide Oval (crowd: 4,000)
Saturday, 6 August	Adelaide 3.1 (3)	drew with	Medindie 3.13 (3)	Kensington Oval
	Bye; South Adelaide
This was the only game that Adelaide played this year that they did not lose

=== Round 15 ===
	Round 15
Saturday, 27 August	Norwood 15.18 (15)	def.	Adelaide 0.6 (0)	Kensington Oval
Saturday, 27 August	South Adelaide 13.18 (13)	def.	Medindie 0.3 (0)	Adelaide Oval (crowd: 300)
	Bye; Port Adelaide

=== Round 16 ===
	Round 16
Thursday, 1 September	Medindie 6.5 (6)	def.	Adelaide 2.6 (2)	Adelaide Oval
Thursday, 1 September	South Adelaide 8.12 (8)	def.	Port Adelaide 3.10 (3)	Adelaide Oval (crowd: 7,500)
	Bye; Norwood
Both games played at the Adelaide Oval, Medindie v Adelaide in the morning and South v Port in the afternoon

=== Round 17 ===
	Round 17
Saturday, 3 September	Norwood 8.7 (8)	def.	South Adelaide 5.9 (5)	Kensington Oval (crowd: 2,000)
Saturday, 3 September	Port Adelaide 19.17 (19)	def.	Adelaide 2.1 (2)	Adelaide Oval
	Bye; Medindie

=== Round 18 ===
	Round 18
Saturday, 10 September	Port Adelaide 8.15 (8)	def.	Norwood 5.10 (5)	Adelaide Oval (crowd: 4,000)
Saturday, 10 September	South Adelaide 7.19 (7)	def.	Medindie 3.4 (3)	Kensington Oval
	Bye; Adelaide

=== Round 19 ===
	Round 19
Saturday, 17 September	Norwood 11.11 (11)	def.	Medindie 3.1 (3)	Kensington Oval (crowd: 100)
Saturday, 17 September	Port Adelaide	def.	Adelaide	Adelaide Oval
	Bye; South Adelaide
Adelaide forfeited their game against Port Adelaide

=== Round 20 ===
	Round 20
Saturday, 24 September	Norwood 3.10 (3)	def. by	South Adelaide 5.8 (5)	Adelaide Oval
Saturday, 24 September	Adelaide 2.2 (2)	def. by	Medindie 3.8 (3)	Kensington Oval
	Bye; Port Adelaide

=== Round 21 ===
	Round 21
Saturday, 1 October	Norwood	def.	Adelaide	Adelaide Oval
	Bye; Medindie, Port Adelaide, South Adelaide
Adelaide forfeited their game against Norwood

== Ladder ==
1892 SAFA Ladder
	TEAM	P	W	L	D	GF	BF	GA	BA	Pts
1	South Adelaide (P)	16	14	1	1	148	200	39	64	29
2	Port Adelaide	16	11	4	1	119	142	59	88	23
3	Norwood	16	10	6	0	119	145	58	70	20
4	Medindie	16	3	12	1	42	67	137	181	7
5	Adelaide	16	0	15	1	15	29	150	180	1
Key: P = Played, W = Won, L = Lost, D = Drawn, GF = Goals For, BF = Behinds For, GA = Goals Against, BA = Behinds Against, (P) = Premiers										

Note: The behinds totals in the above table do not match with the sum of the behinds tallies in the individual match scores. There is some variation in the number of behinds recorded in match reports from different newspapers which may account for the variation.
