= 1886 SAFA season =

1886 SAFA premiership season
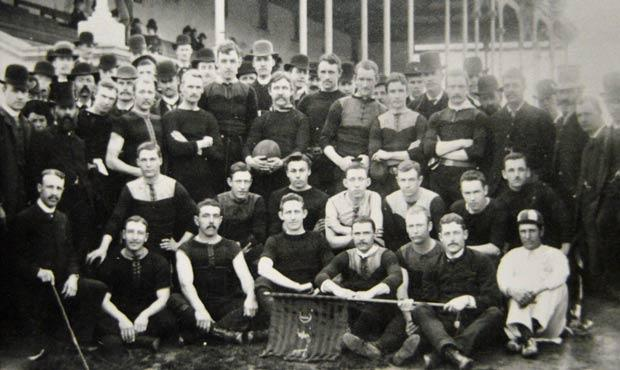
- 10th SAFA season. The 1886 Adelaide premiership team.
- Teams: 4
- Premiers: Adelaide; 1st premiership
- Leading goalkicker: Richard Stephens; Adelaide (17 goals)

Attendance
- Matches played: 30
- Total attendance: 58,600 (1,953 per match)
- Highest: 6,000 (Round 6, Norwood vs. Port Adelaide)

The 1886 South Australian Football Association season was the 10th season of the top-level Australian rules football competition in South Australia.

The new Adelaide Football Club, formed by the merger of North Adelaide Junior and North Parks, won the premiership in just their second senior season. Eight seasons after joining the SAFA, this was the first time Norwood failed to finish in the top two. It was also the first time that Port Adelaide finished last and collected the wooden spoon.

This was the first season in South Australia that quarters were played, allowing ends to be changed four times per match.

The thirty premiership games played had average crowd figures of about 1,950 spectators per game.

== SAFA Senior Clubs 1886 Season ==
Club	Colours	Home Ground	Captain
Adelaide	Black; Red	Adelaide Oval, Adelaide	J. D. Stephens
Norwood	Dark blue Red	Kensington Oval, Kensington	A. J. Roberts
Port Adelaide	Magneta; Blue	Alberton Oval, Alberton	W. Bushby
South Adelaide	Navy Blue; White	Adelaide Oval, Adelaide	A. McIntyre

== Non-premiership match ==
=== Pre-season game ===
	Pre-season game
Monday, 26 April (3:00 pm)	South Adelaide 1.7 (1)	def. by	Norwood 4.10 (4)	Adelaide Oval (crowd: 5,000)
This game did not count towards the premiership

== Premiership season ==
=== Round 1 ===
	Round 1
Saturday, 1 May (3:25 pm)	Norwood 5.9 (5)	def.	Adelaide 1.4 (1)	North Park Lands, Adelaide (crowd: 2,000-3,000)
Saturday, 1 May (3:45 pm)	Port Adelaide 1.4 (1)	def. by	South Adelaide 2.7 (2)	Alberton Oval (crowd: 1,500)
Norwood vs Adelaide was played on Hotham's ground (from Adelaide and Suburban Association) north of the Botanic Park, between the Frome and Hackney roads in the Adelaide Park Lands (now called Park 11: Mistletoe Park / Tainmuntilla). For the first time in several years, a senior association football match was played on an outside ground. This was rendered necessary by the exclusion of the clubs from the Adelaide and Kensington ovals, in consequence of the dispute between them and the custodians of the grounds, respecting the percentage of the gate money each was entitled to.

=== Round 2 ===
	Round 2
Saturday, 8 May	Port Adelaide 1.5 (1)	def. by	Norwood 4.7 (4)	Alberton Oval (crowd: 1,500)
Saturday, 8 May (3:25 pm)	Adelaide 5.4 (5)	def.	South Adelaide 4.8 (4)	Kensington Oval (crowd: 1,350)

=== Round 3 ===
	Round 3
Saturday, 15 May (3:25 pm)	Norwood 3.11 (3)	drew with	South Adelaide 3.8 (3)	Kensington Oval (crowd: 1,750)
Saturday, 15 May (3:25 pm)	Port Adelaide 1.5 (1)	def. by	Adelaide 2.9 (2)	Alberton Oval (crowd: 1,000)

=== Round 4 ===
	Round 4
Saturday, 22 May (3:17 pm)	Norwood 4.9 (4)	def.	Port Adelaide 3.6 (3)	Adelaide Oval (crowd: 1,500)
Saturday, 22 May	Adelaide 4.11 (4)	def.	South Adelaide 2.12 (2)	Kensington Oval

=== Round 5 ===
	Round 5
Monday, 25 May (3:00 pm)	Adelaide 7.8 (7)	def.	Norwood 5.5 (5)	Adelaide Oval (crowd: 5,500)

=== Round 6 ===
	Round 6
Saturday, 29 May (3:17 pm)	South Adelaide 3.7 (3)	def.	Norwood 2.3 (2)	Adelaide Oval (crowd: 1,500)

=== Round 7 ===
	Round 7
Saturday, 5 June (3:10 pm)	South Adelaide 1.12 (1)	drew with	Adelaide 1.7 (1)	Adelaide Oval (crowd: 2,000)
Saturday, 5 June (3:20 pm)	Norwood 5.13 (5)	def.	Port Adelaide 2.3 (2)	Kensington Oval (crowd: 500)

=== Round 8 ===
	Round 8
Saturday, 12 June (3:20 pm)	South Adelaide 2.6 (2)	def. by	Port Adelaide 3.8 (3)	Adelaide Oval (crowd: 1,500)

=== Round 9 ===
	Round 9
Saturday, 19 June (3:00 pm)	South Adelaide 3.8 (3)	def.	Norwood 2.12 (2)	Adelaide Oval (crowd: 2,000)
Saturday, 19 June	Port Adelaide 1.5 (1)	def. by	Adelaide 3.8 (3)	Alberton Oval (crowd: 1,000)

=== Round 10 ===
	Round 10
Monday, 21 June	Norwood 8.13 (8)	def.	Port Adelaide 2.11 (2)	Adelaide Oval (crowd: 6,000)

=== Round 11 ===
	Round 11
Saturday, 26 June (3:00 pm)	Adelaide 2.8 (2)	def. by	Norwood 4.9 (4)	Adelaide Oval (crowd: 3,000)

=== Round 12 ===
	Round 12
Saturday, 3 July (3:30 pm)	Adelaide 6.9 (6)	def.	Port Adelaide 4.6 (4)	Adelaide Oval (crowd: 1,500)

=== Round 13 ===
	Round 13
Saturday, 24 July (3:12 pm)	Adelaide 5.7 (5)	def.	South Adelaide 3.7 (3)	Adelaide Oval (crowd: 1,500)
Saturday, 24 July	Port Adelaide 3.13 (3)	drew with	Norwood 3.7 (3)	Alberton Oval (crowd: 1,000)	>

=== Round 14 ===
	Round 14
Saturday, 31 July (3:10 pm)	Adelaide 2.8 (2)	def. by	Norwood 4.13 (4)	Adelaide Oval (crowd: 2,500)
Saturday, 31 July (3:25 pm)	South Adelaide 9.9 (9)	def.	Port Adelaide 5.3 (5)	Kensington Oval (crowd: 200)
Some newspapers report Port Adelaide's score as 5.4

=== Round 15 ===
	Round 15
Saturday, 7 August (3:10 pm)	South Adelaide 4.12 (4)	def.	Norwood 3.9 (3)	Adelaide Oval (crowd: 2,000)
Saturday, 7 August (3:00 pm)	Port Adelaide 8.9 (8)	def.	Adelaide 5.7 (5)	Alberton Oval (crowd: 650)

=== Round 16 ===
	Round 16
Saturday, 14 August (3:20 pm)	Adelaide 3.19 (3)	def.	Port Adelaide 1.5 (1)	Adelaide Oval (crowd: 1,700)

=== Round 17 ===
	Round 17
Saturday, 21 August	Adelaide 6.7 (6)	def.	Norwood 0.9 (0)	Adelaide Oval (crowd: 3,500)
Saturday, 21 August	Port Adelaide 3.8 (3)	def.	South Adelaide 2.10 (2)	Alberton Oval (crowd: 1,500)

=== Round 18 ===
	Round 18
Saturday, 28 August	Adelaide 2.15 (2)	def. by	South Adelaide 4.4 (4)	Adelaide Oval (crowd: 2,000)

=== Round 19 ===
	Round 19
Wednesday, 1 September (3:17 pm)	South Adelaide 1.5 (1)	def.	Norwood 7.13 (7)	Adelaide Oval (crowd: 3,000)
Norwood originally won the game on 1 September, but the game was later awarded to South Adelaide after a player who was deemed to have been "rough" did not pay his fine.

=== Round 20 ===
	Round 20
Saturday, 4 September (3:30 pm)	South Adelaide 6.6 (6)	def.	Port Adelaide 3.5 (3)	Adelaide Oval (crowd: 1,500)

== Ladder ==
1886 SAFA ladder
	Team	P	W	L	D	GF	BF	GA	BA
1	Adelaide (P)	15	9	5	1	54	131	47	118
2	South Adelaide	15	8	5	2	48	115	50	123
3	Norwood	15	7	6	2	59	146	41	104
4	Port Adelaide	15	3	11	1	41	95	64	137
Key: P = Played, W = Won, L = Lost, D = Drawn, GF = Goals For, BF = Behinds For, GA = Goals Against, BA = Behinds Against, (P) = Premiers									

== Attendances ==
The figures for club and ground attendances are only based on those given above.

=== By club ===
1886 SAFA club attendances
Club	Avg. per game
Norwood	2,672
Adelaide	2,155
South Adelaide	1,882
Port Adelaide	1,503

=== By ground ===
1886 SAFA ground attendances
Ground	Games	Avg. per game
Adelaide Oval	18	2,619
North Park Lands Botanic Gardens	1	2,500
Alberton Oval	7	1,164
Kensington Oval	4	950
