= 1891 SAFA season =

1891 SAFA premiership season
- Teams: 5
- Premiers: Norwood; 10th premiership
- Leading goalkicker: Charles Woods; Norwood (55 goals)
- Matches played: 40
- Highest: 13,000 (Round 9, Norwood v. Port Adelaide)

The 1891 South Australian Football Association season was the 15th season of the top-level Australian rules football competition in South Australia.

The 1891 SAFA season marked the height of interest in South Australian football attendance wise during the 19th century with average attendances not being surpassed until the following century.

The competition was reduced to five clubs when before the season commenced the Gawler Football Association notified that it had no intention of joining for the season i.e. it was withdrawing the Senior Club from the SAFA. It continued its own local junior competition with three local teams, the predecessor of the current Barossa Light and Gawler Football Association.

== Premiership Matches ==
=== Round 1 ===
Saturday, 2 May (3:15pm)	Norwood 5.13 (5)	def.	South Adelaide 2.7 (2)	Kensington Oval
Saturday, 2 May (3:10pm)	Port Adelaide 7.12 (7)	def.	Medindie 1.4 (1)	Adelaide Oval
	Bye; Adelaide

=== Round 2 ===
Saturday, 9 May	Port Adelaide 2.7 (2)	def. by	South Adelaide 3.7 (3)	Alberton Oval (crowd: 2,000)
Saturday, 9 May	Norwood 14.14 (14)	def.	Adelaide 0.0 (0)	Adelaide Oval (crowd: 600)
	Bye; Medindie

=== Round 3 ===
Saturday, 16 May	Norwood 4.6 (4)	def. by	Port Adelaide 9.7 (9)	Kensington (crowd: 5,000)
Saturday, 16 May (3:10pm)	Medindie 3.6 (3)	def.	Adelaide 2.8 (2)	Adelaide Oval
	Bye; South Adelaide

=== Round 4 ===
Saturday, 23 May	South Adelaide 6.11 (6)	def.	Medindie 1.3 (1)	Adelaide Oval
Saturday, 23 May	Port Adelaide 5.12 (5)	def.	Adelaide 2.2 (2)	Alberton Oval
	Bye; Norwood

=== Round 5 ===
Monday, 25 May (3:15pm)	South Adelaide 9.12 (9)	def.	Adelaide 2.0 (2)	Adelaide Oval (crowd: 1,500)
	Bye; Norwood, Port Adelaide, Medindie

=== Round 6 ===
Saturday, 30 May (3:15pm)	South Adelaide 3.15 (3)	def.	Port Adelaide 1.5 (1)	Adelaide Oval
Saturday, 30 May	Medindie 3.5 (3)	def.	Adelaide 1.6 (1)	Kensington Oval
	Bye; Norwood

=== Round 7 ===
Saturday, 6 June (3:15pm)	Adelaide 1.0 (1)	def. by	Port Adelaide 12.19 (12)	Adelaide Oval
Saturday, 6 June	Norwood 7.9 (7)	def.	Medindie 3.5 (3)	Kensington Oval
	Bye; South Adelaide

=== South Australia vs. Victoria ===
Saturday, 13 June	South Australia 5.9 (5)	def. by	Victoria 7.8 (7)	Adelaide Oval (crowd: 7,500)

=== Round 8 ===
Saturday, 20 June	South Adelaide 10.10 (10)	def.	Medindie 2.0 (2)	Adelaide Oval
Saturday, 20 June	Norwood 13.16 (13)	def.	Adelaide 5.2 (5)	Kensington Oval (crowd: 200)
	Bye; Port Adelaide

=== Round 9 ===
Monday, 22 June	Norwood 6.11 (6)	def.	Port Adelaide 5.6 (5)	Adelaide Oval (crowd: 13,000)
Monday, 22 June	South Adelaide 14.22 (14)	def.	Adelaide 1.3 (1)	Adelaide Oval
	Bye; Medindie

=== Round 10 ===
Saturday, 27 June (3:11pm)	Norwood 10.6 (10)	def.	South Adelaide 6.3 (6)	Adelaide Oval (crowd: 8,500)
Saturday, 27 June	Port Adelaide 7.11 (7)	def.	Medindie 4.5 (4)	Alberton Oval
	Bye; Adelaide

=== Round 11 ===
Saturday, 4 July (3:10pm)	South Adelaide 2.4 (2)	def. by	Port Adelaide 6.9 (6)	Adelaide Oval (crowd: 3,500)
Saturday, 4 July	Norwood 8.20 (8)	def.	Medindie 1.5 (1)	Kensington Oval
	Bye; Adelaide

=== Round 12 ===
Saturday, 11 July	Norwood 1.3 (1)	def. by	Port Adelaide 6.9 (6)	Adelaide Oval (crowd: 8,000)
Saturday, 11 July	Medindie 7.9 (7)	def.	Adelaide 3.3 (3)	Kensington Oval
	Bye; South Adelaide

=== Round 13 ===
Saturday, 18 July	Adelaide 1.2 (1)	def. by	Port Adelaide 20.16 (20)	Adelaide Oval
Saturday, 18 July	Norwood 11.7 (11)	def.	South Adelaide 1.2 (1)	Kensington Oval (crowd: 2,500)
	Bye; Medindie

=== Round 14 ===
Saturday, 25 July	Norwood 10.13 (10)	def.	Adelaide 2.5 (2)	Kensington Oval
Saturday, 25 July	South Adelaide 8.10 (8)	def.	Medindie 1.2 (1)	Adelaide Oval
	Bye; Port Adelaide

=== Round 15 ===
Saturday, 15 August	Norwood 10.9 (10)	def.	Medindie 1.1 (1)	Kensington Oval
Saturday, 15 August	South Adelaide 13.13 (13)	def.	Adelaide 1.3 (1)	Adelaide Oval
	Bye; Port Adelaide

=== Round 16 ===
Saturday, 22 August	Port Adelaide 15.5 (15)	def.	Medindie 1.0 (1)	Alberton Oval
Saturday, 22 August	South Adelaide 3.16 (3)	def.	Norwood 1.6 (1)	Adelaide Oval
	Bye; Adelaide

=== Round 17 ===
Saturday, 29 August	Norwood 10.18 (10)	def.	Medindie 0.3 (0)	Adelaide Oval
Saturday, 29 August	Port Adelaide 16.15 (16)	def.	Adelaide 1.2 (1)	Alberton Oval
	Bye; South Adelaide

=== Round 18 ===
Tuesday, 1 September	Medindie 7.8 (7)	def.	Adelaide 3.3 (3)	Adelaide Oval
Tuesday, 1 September	South Adelaide 3.6 (3)	def. by	Port Adelaide 5.10 (5)	Adelaide Oval (crowd: 4,500)
	Bye; Norwood

=== Round 19 ===
Saturday, 5 September	Norwood 5.4 (5)	def.	Port Adelaide 3.4 (3)	Adelaide Oval (crowd: 10,000)
Saturday, 5 September	South Adelaide 6.7 (6)	def.	Medindie 2.3 (2)	Kensington Oval
	Bye; Adelaide

=== Round 20 ===
Saturday, 12 September	Medindie 1.3 (1)	def. by	Port Adelaide 9.16 (9)	Adelaide Oval (crowd: 200)
Saturday, 12 September	South Adelaide 7.16 (7)	def.	Adelaide 1.2 (1)	Kensington Oval
	Bye; Norwood

=== Round 21 ===
Saturday, 19 September	Adelaide 2.5 (2)	def. by	Norwood 11.17 (11)	Adelaide Oval
	Bye; Medindie, Port Adelaide, South Adelaide

== Ladder ==
1891 SAFA Ladder
	TEAM	P	W	L	D	GF	BF	GA	BA	Pts
1	Norwood (P)	16	13	3	0	125	173	49	74	26
2	Port Adelaide	16	12	4	0	122	154	39	74	24
3	South Adelaide	16	11	5	0	96	159	52	79	22
4	Medindie	16	4	12	0	37	60	108	145	8
5	Adelaide	16	0	16	0	27	39	159	213	0
Key: P = Played, W = Won, L = Lost, D = Drawn, GF = Goals For, BF = Behinds For, GA = Goals Against, BA = Behinds Against, (P) = Premiers										
