= 1885 SAFA season =

1885 SAFA premiership season
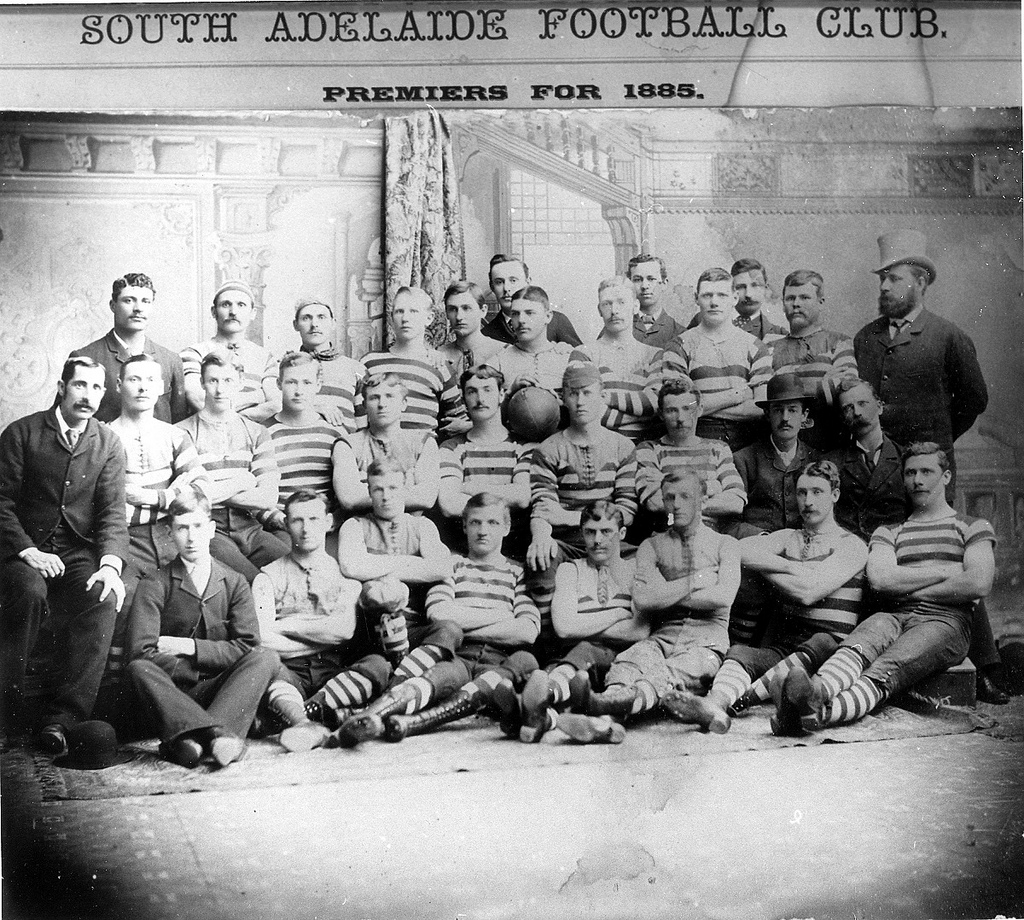
- South Adelaide, premiers
- Teams: 4
- Premiers: South Adelaide; 2nd premiership
- Leading goalkicker: H R Hill; South Adelaide (19 goals)

Attendance
- Matches played: 30
- Total attendance: 54,000 (1,800 per match)
- Highest: 8,000 (Round 6, Adelaide vs. South Adelaide)

The 1885 South Australian Football Association season was the 9th season of the top-level Australian rules football competition in South Australia.

A new senior Adelaide Football Club formed from a merger of North Adelaide Junior and North Parks clubs from the Adelaide and Suburban Football Association joined.

However, two inaugural clubs - South Park on 18 March 1885 and Victorians (North Adelaide) on 21 April 1885 both resigned and disbanded before the season commenced reducing the number of teams in the competition to 4.

The 1885 SAFA season was the first time since 1878 that all clubs played a fixed number of games with each of the four clubs playing five times against the other three for a total of 15 games.

Twenty three of the thirty games played had crowd figures quoted for an approximate average of 1,800 spectators per game.

At the committee meeting of the S.A. Football Association held on 28 April 1885 Messrs. A. Mehrtens, J. Sidoli, F. H. Wedd, and J.Pollock were appointed Association Field Umpires from the eleven applicants.

The large scoring-board at the Adelaide Oval was first used for football matches during the season. A new fence and bicycle track had also been added around the Oval.

The first ever night match under lights at Adelaide Oval was held on 1st July 1885 for the match between Adelaide and South Adelaide.

== SAFA Senior Clubs 1885 Season ==
Club	Colours	Home Ground	Captain	Comments
Adelaide	Black; Red	Adelaide Oval, Adelaide	J.D. Stephens	New Adelaide Senior Club formed from the merger of North Adelaide Junior and North Park
Norwood	Dark blue Red	Kensington Oval, Kensington	A.E. Waldron	
Port Adelaide	Magneta; Blue	Alberton Oval, Alberton	R.Turpenny C.Kellett	
South Adelaide	Navy Blue; White	Adelaide Oval, Adelaide	A.J.Hall	

== Premiership season ==
=== Round 1 ===
	Round 1
Saturday, 2 May (3:15 pm)	Norwood 6.15 (6)	def.	Adelaide 1.5 (1)	Kensington Oval
Saturday, 2 May (3:15 pm)	South Adelaide 4.11 (4)	def.	Port Adelaide 3.3 (3)	Adelaide Oval (crowd: 1,500)

=== Round 2 ===
	Round 2
Monday, 25 May	South Adelaide 5.13 (5)	def.	Norwood 0.8 (0)	Adelaide Oval (crowd: 4,500)
	Bye; Port Adelaide, Adelaide
Port Adelaide was on a football trip in Victoria during rounds 2 and 3.

=== Round 3 ===
	Round 3
Saturday, 31 May	South Adelaide 4.9	def.	Adelaide 2.11	Adelaide Oval (crowd: 950)
	Bye; Port Adelaide, Norwood
Adelaide Oval's surface was in poor condition due to the famous Indigenous corroboree the night before. It was performed by around 100 Aboriginal men and women from Point MacLeay mission and Yorke Peninsula and was attended by around 20,000 spectators (around a sixth of Adelaide's population). It was followed by a second performance on the Saturday evening. The match between South Adelaide and Adelaide was witnessed by about forty aborigines, who were seated upon the lawn in front of the pavilion.

=== Round 4 ===
	Round 4
Saturday, 6 June (3:10 pm)	South Adelaide 3.11 (3)	def. by	Norwood 5.8 (5)	Adelaide Oval (crowd: 2,000)
Saturday, 6 June (3:10 pm)	Port Adelaide 10.14 (10)	def.	Adelaide 2.11 (2)	Alberton Oval (crowd: 800)

=== Round 5 ===
	Round 5
Monday, 22 June (3:00 pm)	Norwood 3.7 (3)	def. by	Port Adelaide 5.20 (5)	Adelaide Oval (crowd: 6,000)

=== Round 6 ===
	Round 6
Saturday, 27 June (3:00 pm)	Port Adelaide 2.5 (2)	def. by	South Adelaide 3.16 (3)	Alberton Oval (crowd: 1,500)
Saturday, 27 June (3:15 pm)	Adelaide 4.5 (4)	def.	Norwood 0.13 (0)	Adelaide Oval

=== Novelty match ===
	Novelty match
Wednesday, 1 July (8:00 pm)	Adelaide 1.8 (1)	def.	South Adelaide 0.8 (0)	Adelaide Oval (crowd: 8,000)
The game between Adelaide and South Adelaide at Adelaide Oval under artificial light was the first night game ever played in South Australia.; This match did not count towards the premiership

=== Round 7 ===
	Round 7
Saturday, 4 July	Port Adelaide 2.12 (2)	def. by	Norwood 3.8 (3)	Alberton Oval (crowd: 2,000)

=== Round 8 ===
	Round 8
Saturday, 11 July (3:25 pm)	Norwood 0.5 (0)	drew with	South Adelaide 0.12 (0)	Kensington Oval
Saturday, 11 July (3:18 pm)	Adelaide 0.10 (0)	def. by	Port Adelaide 2.10 (2)	Adelaide Oval (crowd: 600)

=== Round 9 ===
	Round 9
Saturday, 18 July	Norwood 1.20 (1)	def. by	Adelaide 4.10 (4)	Kensington Oval (crowd: 400)
Saturday, 18 July (3:13 pm)	South Adelaide 2.8 (2)	drew with	Port Adelaide 2.15 (2)	Adelaide Oval (crowd: 3,000)
During the South Adelaide v Port Adelaide match there was a dispute over whether a South Adelaide shot was deemed a goal or a behind. After conflicting evidence from the field and goal umpires, the result of the match was declared "null and void" at the next SAFA meeting. Port Adelaide refused to replay the match and South Adelaide was awarded a victory on forfeit.

=== Round 10 ===
	Round 10
Saturday, 25 July (3:25 pm)	Norwood 3.11 (3)	def.	Port Adelaide 2.16 (2)	Kensington Oval (crowd: 1,000)
Saturday, 25 July	Adelaide 0.5 (0)	def. by	South Adelaide 6.14 (6)	Adelaide Oval

=== Round 11 ===
	Round 11
Saturday, 1 August (3:16 pm)	South Adelaide 8.11 (8)	def.	Norwood 4.5 (4)	Adelaide Oval (crowd: 2,000)
Saturday, 1 August (3:20 pm)	Port Adelaide 8.17 (8)	def.	Adelaide 1.8 (1)	Alberton Oval (crowd: 500)

=== Round 12 ===
	Round 12
Saturday, 8 August (3:10 pm)	South Adelaide 5.10 (5)	def.	Adelaide 3.11 (3)	Kensington Oval (crowd: 500)
	Bye; Port Adelaide, Norwood

=== Round 13 ===
	Round 13
Saturday, 15 August (3:29 pm)	Port Adelaide 2.11 (2)	def.	South Adelaide 1.5 (1)	Alberton Oval (crowd: 2,000)
Saturday, 15 August (3:28 pm)	Adelaide 3.5 (3)	def. by	Norwood 4.6 (4)	Adelaide Oval (crowd: 1,000)

=== Round 14 ===
	Round 14
Saturday, 22 August (3:25 pm)	Port Adelaide 1.13 (1)	def. by	Norwood 6.16 (6)	Alberton Oval (crowd: 2,000)
Saturday, 22 August (3:20 pm)	Adelaide 2.4 (2)	def. by	South Adelaide 11.13 (11)	Kensington Oval (crowd: 300)

=== Round 15 ===
	Round 15
Saturday, 29 August (3:20 pm)	Adelaide 6.9 (6)	def.	Norwood 1.13 (1)	Kensington Oval
Saturday, 29 August (3:15 pm)	South Adelaide 6.14 (6)	drew with	Port Adelaide 6.2 (6)	Adelaide Oval (crowd: 5,000)

=== Round 16 ===
	Round 16
Saturday, 5 September	Norwood 2.11 (2)	def. by	South Adelaide 8.10 (8)	Kensington Oval (crowd: 550)
Saturday, 5 September	Adelaide 2.6 (2)	def. by	Port Adelaide 3.13 (3)	Adelaide Oval (crowd: 500)

=== Round 17 ===
	Round 17
Saturday, 12 September (3:18 pm)	Adelaide 5.5 (5)	def. by	South Adelaide 8.7 (8)	Adelaide Oval
Saturday, 12 September (3:30 pm)	Norwood 4.14 (4)	def.	Port Adelaide 2.8 (2)	Kensington Oval (crowd: 800)

=== Round 18 ===
	Round 18
Saturday, 18 September (3:30 pm)	Adelaide 3.5 (3)	def.	Port Adelaide 1.14 (1)	Adelaide Oval

== Ladder ==
1885 SAFA Senior Ladder
	TEAM	P	W	L	D	GF	BA	GA	BA
1	South Adelaide (P)	15	11	2	2	72	159	36	96
2	Norwood	15	7	7	1	42	162	54	161
3	Port Adelaide	15	6	8	1	49	159	41	146
4	Adelaide	15	4	11	0	38	111	70	188
Key: P = Played, W = Won, L = Lost, D = Drawn, GF = Goals For, BF = Behinds For, GA = Goals Against, BA = Behinds Against, (P) = Premiers									

== Adelaide and Suburban (Junior) Association ==
The Junior sides of the four senior clubs competed in the Adelaide and Suburban (Junior) Association together with Kensington, Hotham and West Torrens.

Kensington had competed in the Senior competition for four seasons from 1877 to 1880 before merging with the Old Adelaide Football Club. The merged Club folded after 4 games in 1881. Kensington joined the Adelaide and Suburban (Junior) Association on its formation in 1882.

Hotham (North Adelaide) and West Torrens (West Adelaide) both joined the senior SAFA competition in 1887.

In 1889, Hotham (North Adelaide) then merged with the new senior Adelaide Club which was formed in 1885, formerly North Adelaide Junior and North Park both from the Adelaide and Suburban Association. North Park were the Premiers of Adelaide and Suburban Association in 1884 with Adelaide (renamed from North Adelaide Junior) as the runner up. This merged new Adelaide team won the Senior SAFA premiership in 1886.

A notable player for Hotham was Jack 'Dinny' Reedman who moved to South Adelaide in 1889 when Hotham merged with Adelaide. Reedman was inducted into the Australian Football Hall of Fame in 1996 and South Australian Football Hall of Fame in 2002.

1885 Adelaide and Suburban (Junior) Association Ladder
	TEAM	P	W	L	D	GF	GA	PTS
1	Hotham (P)	12	12	0	0	63	12	24
2	West Torrens	12	10	2	0	56	10	20
3	North Park (Adelaide Junior)	12	6	5	1	33	36	13
4	Norwood Junior	12	5	7	0	24	23	10
5	South Adelaide Junior	12	4	7	1	26	36	9
6	Kensington	12	2	10	0	11	46	4
7	Port Adelaide Junior	12	2	10	0	9	59	4
Key: P = Played, W = Won, L = Lost, D = Drawn, GF = Goals For, GA = Goals Against, (P) = Premiers								
