= 1890 SAFA season =

1890 SAFA premiership season
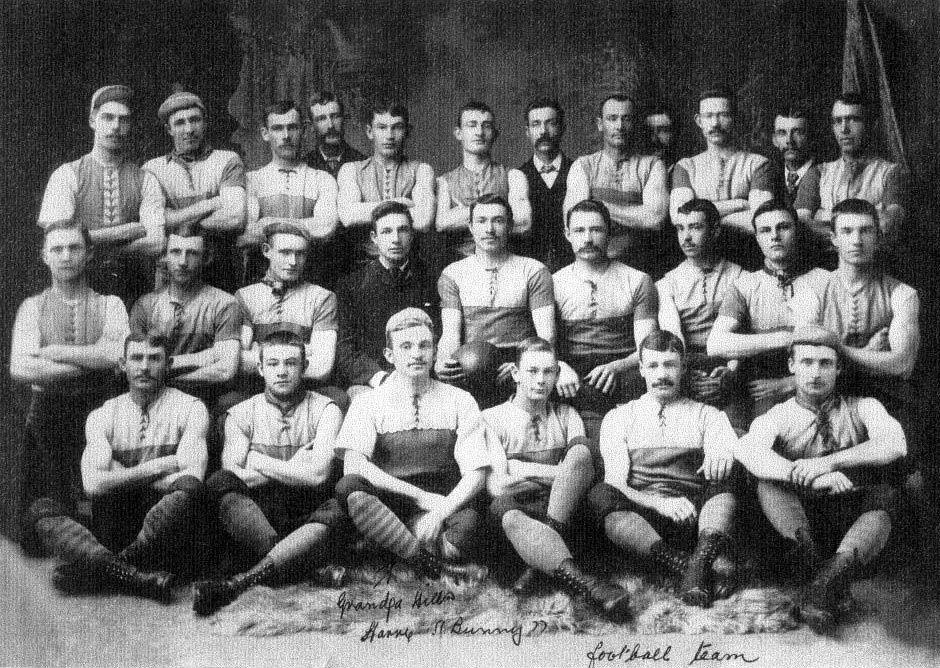
- Port Adelaide, premiers
- Premiers: Port Adelaide; 2nd premiership
- Leading goalkicker: John McKenzie; Port Adelaide (32 goals)
- Matches played: 50
- Highest: 11,500 (30 August, Norwood vs. Port Adelaide)

The 1890 South Australian Football Association season was the 14th season of the top-level Australian rules football competition in South Australia.

== Background and Programme ==
The start of the season on 5 May was delayed due to a dispute between the Association and Burnside District Council which owned the Kensington Oval. Initially only 4 matches were programmed for Kensington Oval whilst 17 were for Adelaide Oval. Burnside counter proposed 8 for Kensington and 13 for Adelaide Oval. The matter was settled when the Association presented a revised programme of 6 matches for Kensington Oval.
The Game between South Adelaide and Gawler for Kensington Oval was postponed to later in the year.

Despite protests from Gawler the 1890 Programme gave them only five home games (one each against the other clubs) and two away games in Adelaide against each of the city clubs. They forfeited both of their games against Port Adelaide at Alberton and ended up collecting the wooden spoon. The end of year report stated they had a good deal to put up with in the way of a badly arranged programme, for they were brought down to town Saturday after Saturday, and sometimes to play the same team on two successive Saturdays. Despite rumours during the season that they were going resign they voted to complete their scheduled games.

The Gawler Football Association subsequently withdrew their Senior Club from the SAFA before the beginning of 1891 season and continued its own competition with 3 local teams - Gawler South, Gawler Central and Willaston, the predecessor of the current Barossa Light and Gawler Football Association. The Gawler Football Association made a number of attempts over the decades to have a senior readmitted, which was only successful once in December 1912 to fill the vacant 8th place, but they withdrew before the 1913 Season commenced.

== Premiership Matches ==
=== Round 1 ===
	Round 1
Saturday, 3 May	Adelaide 6.15 (6)	def.	Medindie 1.5 (1)	Adelaide Oval

=== Round 2 ===
	Round 2
Saturday, 10 May	South Adelaide 6.2 (6)	def.	Adelaide 3.7 (3)	Adelaide Oval (crowd: 2,500)
Saturday, 10 May (3:30 pm)	Norwood 5.4 (5)	def.	Medindie 4.5 (4)	Kensington Oval (crowd: 3,000)
Saturday, 10 May	Port Adelaide	def.	Gawler (Forfeit)	Alberton Oval
A game was scheduled between Port Adelaide and Gawler at Alberton Oval but the latter telegrammed the Association Secretary to inform that they would forfeit due to the programme only being received late on Friday afternoon (09 May).

=== Round 3 ===
	Round 3
Saturday, 17 May (3:30 pm)	Port Adelaide 1.4 (1)	def. by	Norwood 2.9 (2)	Alberton Oval (crowd: 3,000)
Saturday, 17 May	South Adelaide 5.9 (5)	def.	Medindie 2.5 (2)	Adelaide Oval (crowd: 1,000)
Saturday, 17 May (3:30 pm)	Adelaide 8.15 (8)	def.	Gawler 0.2 (0)	Kensington Oval

=== Round 4 ===
	Round 4
Saturday, 24 May (3:16 pm)	Adelaide 2.3 (2)	def. by	Norwood 7.10 (7)	Adelaide Oval (crowd: 4,000)
Saturday, 24 May (3:30 pm)	Port Adelaide 6.13 (6)	def.	Medindie 1.1 (1)	Alberton Oval (crowd: 500)
Saturday, 24 May (3:30 pm)	South Adelaide 4.10 (4)	def.	Gawler 3.1 (3)	Kensington Oval
After the match on Saturday while all the Gawler players were together in the train returning, enjoying themselves in a jovial manner, quite unconscious of their recent defeat, it was unanimously decided to still continue in the Association in spite of the bad treatment, and play the fixtures arranged. A good deal of dissatisfaction was expressed at the action of clubs trying to 'cadge' their players, and the climax was reached when a player selected, and who went down with the intention of helping the Gawlers, informed them that a club's supporters waited at the station with a cab, and securing him abducted him to their playing grounds, thus accounting for his non-appearance at Kensington. At a committee meeting of the Gawlers it was decided that the match arranged for the Adelaide Oval for the holiday should be abandoned, but the players are determined to go against their executive, and therefore they will meet the Medindies oh the 26th, in the morning, according to the fixture.

=== Round 5 ===
	Round 5
Monday, 26 May (3.05pm)	South Adelaide 3.2 (3)	def. by	Port Adelaide 5.9 (5)	Adelaide Oval (crowd: 5,000)
Monday, 26 May (10:40am)	Medindie 5.14 (5)	def.	Gawler 1.2 (1)	Adelaide Oval (crowd: 1000)
After 46 loses and just only one win (against North Adelaide Hotham back in September 1888) this was Medindie's first win after 20 consecutive losses and the first ever against Gawler.

=== Round 6 ===
Saturday, 31 May (3:20pm)	Norwood 9.11 (9)	def.	Medindie 0.2 (0)	Adelaide Oval (crowd: 500)
Saturday, 31 May	South Adelaide	def.	Gawler (forfeit)	Kensington Oval (crowd: Cancelled)
A game was scheduled between South Adelaide and Gawler - It was Gawler's 3rd scheduled game within 7 days in Adelaide. It was reported - The Gawlers were to have played the Souths, but forfeited. Their reason was that they objected to being down on the list to play five matohes in succession in Adelaide without one on their own ground. If they had played they would have met the South Adelaides twice on two consecutive Saturdays. This is the second time the Gawlers have forfeited this season, and it is to be hoped it will be the last, as if this sort of thing occurs frequently it will be far better for them to resign their position in the association altogether.

=== Round 7 ===
Saturday, 7 June (3:10pm)	Norwood 5.6 (5)	def.	South Adelaide 1.2 (1)	Adelaide Oval (crowd: 3,000)
Saturday, 7 June	Adelaide 4.5 (4)	def.	Medindie 3.6 (3)	Kensington Oval
Saturday, 7 June (3:35pm)	Gawler 1.5 (1)	def. by	Port Adelaide 4.7 (4)	Gawler Oval (crowd: 500)
Gawler vs Port Adelaide game started 35 mins late and as a consequence the last quarter was played in darkness

=== Round 8 ===
Saturday, 14 June (3:25pm)	Adelaide 0.3 (0)	def. by	Port Adelaide 4.13 (4)	Adelaide Oval (crowd: 1,500)
Saturday, 14 June	Gawler (Forfeit)	def. by	Norwood	Gawler Oval
A match was scheduled at Gawler Oval between Gawler and Norwood. But owing to fhe sloppy state of the ground the Gawlers forfeited. In the evening the visitors were entertained at dinner by the local team.

=== Round 9 ===
Friday, 20 June	Gawler 2.5 (2)	drew with	Adelaide 2.6 (2)	Gawler (crowd: 600)
Friday, 20 June	Norwood 3.3 (3)	def. by	Port Adelaide 5.10 (5)	Adelaide Oval (crowd: 10,000)

=== Round 10 ===
Saturday, 21 June (3:20pm)	Adelaide 2.2 (2)	drew with	South Adelaide 2.10 (2)	Kensington Oval (crowd: 600)
Saturday, 21 June (3:30pm)	Port Adelaide 6.12 (6)	def.	Medindie 2.1 (2)	Alberton Oval (crowd: 400)
Saturday, 21 June (3:25pm)	Norwood 7.13 (7)	def.	Gawler 4.2 (4)	Adelaide Oval

=== Round 11 ===
Saturday, 28 June (3:20pm)	Norwood 10.13 (10)	def.	Adelaide 1.3 (1)	Kensington Oval
Saturday, 28 June (3:20pm)	South Adelaide 2.4 (2)	def. by	Port Adelaide 6.14 (6)	Adelaide Oval (crowd: 3,000)

=== Intercolonial Matches ===
On the weekends of 5 July and 12 July intercolonial matches were held and SAFA premiership matches suspended.

	Victoria vs. South Australia
Saturday, 5 July (Time pm)	Victoria 13.8 (13)	def.	South Australia 6.5 (6)	Melbourne Cricket Ground (crowd: 16000)
The Victorian uniform consisted of blue jersey with yellow sash, blue hose and caps, white knickerbockers. The South Australian colours are red, white, and blue jerseys, hose, and cape, and navy blue knickerbockers. South Australian Team of 20 consisted of 9 Norwood, 9 Port Adelaide and 2 South Adelaide.

=== Round 12 ===
Medindie vs Gawler at Kensington Oval – Game abandoned due to the weather and ground.
On Saturday 12 July 1890 the Gawlers journeyed to Kensington to fufil their engagement with the Medindie club. The weather was wretchedly bad, and after the Gawlers had 'stripped' and were in the field the Medindie captain refused to play, and appealed to the umpire, Mr. McIntyre, who acquiesced, and would not sanction the game owing to the bad state of the weather and the grounds, notwithstanding the fact that the Gawlers had a fully representative team on the field practising to keep themselves warm. When the result was made known to the Gawler players it was received with great dissention, and references were made to the Victorian Association, where engagements are kept whether playing in a lake or in a mud puddle.

=== Round 13 ===
Saturday, 19 July (3:20pm)	Adelaide 0.5 (0)	def. by	Port Adelaide 11.12 (11)	Adelaide Oval
Saturday, 19 July (3:30pm)	South Adelaide 4.11 (4)	def.	Medindie 1.5 (1)	Kensington Oval (crowd: 200)
Saturday, 19 July (3:30pm)	Gawler 1.2 (1)	def. by	Norwood 9.10 (9)	Gawler (crowd: 350)
Norwood vs Gawler was originally programmed for Adelaide Oval but was moved to Gawler by mutual consent. Port Adelaide vs Adelaide was moved from Alberton to Adelaide Oval

=== Round 14 ===
Saturday, 26 July	Norwood 6.7 (6)	def.	Port Adelaide 3.7 (3)	Kensington Oval (crowd: 8,500)
Saturday, 26 July (3:15pm)	South Adelaide 5.7 (5)	def.	Adelaide 2.7 (2)	Adelaide Oval

=== Round 15 ===
Saturday, 2 August	Norwood 5.7 (5)	def. by	South Adelaide 8.8 (8)	Kensington Oval (crowd: 3,000)
Saturday, 2 August (3:25pm)	Medindie 1.1 (1)	def. by	Port Adelaide 20.15 (20)	Adelaide Oval
Port Adelaide's score of 20.15 (20) was the competitions record at the time.

=== Round 16 ===
Saturday, 9 August	South Adelaide 4.9 (4)	def. by	Port Adelaide 9.13 (9)	Adelaide Oval (crowd: 3,000)
Saturday, 9 August (3:30pm)	Norwood 16.13 (16)	def.	Adelaide 1.4 (1)	Kensington Oval

=== Round 17 ===
Saturday, 16 August (3:30pm)	Adelaide 3.3 (3)	def. by	Port Adelaide 13.8 (13)	Adelaide Oval
Saturday, 16 August	Norwood 8.14 (8)	def.	Medindie 1.4 (1)	Kensington Oval
Saturday, 16 August	Gawler 1.11 (1)	def. by	South Adelaide 6.13 (6)	Gawler

=== Round 18 ===
Saturday, 23 August	Norwood 11.15 (11)	def.	South Adelaide 5.8 (5)	Kensington Oval (crowd: 2,000)
Saturday, 23 August (3:30pm)	Adelaide 7.10 (7)	v	Medindie 5.2 (5)	Adelaide Oval
Saturday, 23 August	Port Adelaide	def.	Gawler (Forfeit)	Alberton Oval
A game was scheduled between Port Adelaide and Gawler at Alberton Oval but Gawler forfeited for the 2nd time in the Season against Port Adelaide at Alberton. Port played an intraclub match.

=== Round 19 ===
Saturday, 30 August	Port Adelaide 3.2 (3)	def.	Norwood 2.7 (2)	Adelaide Oval (crowd: 11,500)
Saturday, 30 August (3:25pm)	South Adelaide 8.9 (8)	def.	Medindie 1.7 (1)	Kensington Oval (crowd: 25)
The Port Adelaide v. Norwood attendance of 11,500 was the record crowd for a football match in South Australia at the time. The result of the game ultimately decided the premiership for the season.

- A game was scheduled between Adelaide and Gawler at Alberton Oval but Adelaide forfeited due to most of their players wanting to watch the Port Adelaide vs Norwood Match at the Adelaide Oval. Initially this was showing in the published table on Monday 1 September as a win for Gawler but in the Final Table at the end of the year the game has been removed.

=== Round 20 ===
Monday, 1 September (10:30am)	Medindie 11.17 (11)	def.	Gawler 0.8 (0)	Adelaide Oval
Monday, 1 September (3:15pm)	Adelaide 5.7 (5)	def.	South Adelaide 4.7 (4)	Adelaide Oval
Monday 1 September was 8 Hour Day Public Holiday

=== Round 21 ===
Saturday, 6 September	Adelaide 3.8 (3)	def. by	Norwood 4.8 (4)	Adelaide Oval (crowd: 1,000)
Saturday, 6 September	Port Adelaide 8.13 (8)	def.	South Adelaide 2.9 (2)	Alberton Oval (crowd: 650)
Saturday, 6 September	Gawler 0.3 (0)	drew with	Medindie 0.1 (0)	Gawler
The game between Gawler and Medindie was abandoned at half-time due to torrential rain during the 2nd quarter when all but 3 of the Gawler players had left the field. When the shower passed over the bell was rung, but only the Gawlers and the umpire came on the ground. Shortly after the captain of the Medindies appeared and a dispute arose. The Medindies claimed a draw, as they said they had been ordered off the field. The umpire then tried to persuade them, but they still refused and said the rules were in their favor. The ground certainly was wet, and there were pools of water about, but matches have been played when it was in a worse condition. A considerable amount of argument took place in the pavilion, but the Medindies would not give way, and subsequently left the ground amid the hooting of the spectators. Gawler's team, said that the umpire stated that the ground was fit to play on, and that the Gawlers were willing to continue the game, but that the Medindies refused. The Gawler team claims the game, and the matter will be laid before the association. This game at Gawler Oval was the last South Australian league level match at the venue as Gawler then withdrew from the competition before the start of 1891 season.

=== Round 22 ===
Saturday, 13 September	Norwood 11.8 (11)	def.	South Adelaide 2.6 (2)	Adelaide Oval (crowd: 2,000)

=== Round 23 ===
Saturday, 20 September	Adelaide 0.1 (0)	def. by	Port Adelaide 20.20 (20)	Adelaide Oval
Prior to the match C.Woods lead the competition goal kicking tally by 3, however John McKenzie kicked 13 goals during the course of the match to win the years goal kicking award.

== Ladder ==
1890 SAFA Ladder
	TEAM	P	W	L	D	GF	BF	GA	BA	Pts	Adj Pts
1	Port Adelaide (P)	18	16	2	0	124	172	32	70	32	32.00
2	Norwood	18	15	3	0	120	158	45	81	30	30.00
3	South Adelaide	18	9	8	1	71	126	80	137	19	19.00
4	Adelaide	17	5	10	2	48	105	113	142	12	12.71
5	Medindie	15	2	12	1	39	76	89	141	5	6.00
6	Gawler	14	0	12	2	13	40	56	106	2	2.57
Key: P = Played, W = Won, L = Lost, D = Drawn, GF = Goals For, BF = Behinds For, Georgia = Goals Against, BA = Behinds Against, Pts = Points, Adj Pts = Points adjusted for match ratio, (P) = Premiers											

Notes: Medindie played each Club 3 times.
Gawler also played each Club 3 times (except Adelaide who they played only twice)
See Round 15 – Adelaide forfeited to Gawler. Match was to be played at Alberton Oval.
Gawler were programmed one home game and two away games against all the clubs.
All the other clubs played each other 4 times.
