= 1889 SAFA season =

1889 SAFA premiership season
- Teams: 6
- Premiers: Norwood; 9th premiership
- Minor premiers: Norwood; Port Adelaide; 1st minor premiership
- Leading goalkicker: Charlie Fry; Port Adelaide (32 goals)
- Matches played: 48
- Highest: 11,000 (Grand Final, Norwood v. Port Adelaide)

The 1889 South Australian Football Association season was the 13th season of the top-level Australian rules football competition in South Australia.

As Norwood and Port Adelaide finished level on premiership points, the first ever dedicated premiership playoff match in a major Australian rules football competition was held, with Norwood winning to claim the 1889 premiership.

North Adelaide (formerly called Hotham prior to 1888) after two seasons in the S.A.F.A. merged with Adelaide. The merged club retained Adelaide's name and their Black and Red colours.

== Minor Round ==
=== Round 1 ===
	Round 1
Saturday, 4 May (3:10 pm)	Adelaide 3.8 (3)	def.	South Adelaide 2.9 (2)	Adelaide Oval (crowd: 2,500)
Saturday, 4 May (3:20 pm)	Norwood 14.11 (14)	def.	Gawler 0.0 (0)	Kensington Oval
Saturday, 4 May (3:20 pm)	Port Adelaide 9.16 (9)	def.	Medindie 0.1 (0)	Alberton Oval

=== Round 2 ===
	Round 2
Saturday, 11 May (Time pm)	Norwood 7.5 (7)	def.	Port Adelaide 2.7 (2)	Kensington Oval (crowd: 4,000)
Saturday, 11 May (Time pm)	Adelaide 6.10 (6)	def.	Medindie 1.5 (1)	Adelaide Oval
Saturday, 11 May (Time pm)	Gawler 1.9 (1)	def. by	South Adelaide 7.9 (7)	Gawler Oval

=== Round 3 ===
	Round 3
Saturday, 18 May (Time pm)	Norwood 7.12 (7)	def.	South Adelaide 2.1 (2)	Adelaide Oval (crowd: 4,000)
Saturday, 18 May (Time pm)	Port Adelaide 5.10 (5)	def.	Adelaide 2.1 (2)	Alberton Oval
	Bye; Gawler, Medindie

=== Round 4 (Friday 24th May Queen's Birthday Holiday) ===
	Round 4
Friday, 24 May (Morning)	South Adelaide 5.7 (5)	def.	Medindie 2.? (2)	Adelaide Oval
Friday, 24 May (Time 3.10pm)	Norwood 4.7 (4)	def.	Adelaide 3.7 (3)	Adelaide Oval (crowd: 5000)
Friday, 24 May (Time 3.05pm)	Gawler 0.2 (0)	def. by	Port Adelaide 7.13 (7)	Gawler Oval (crowd: 500)
May 24. South Adelaide v. Medindie at Adelaide Oval was advertised for the morning. South Adelaide started the game with just 17 players.

=== Round 4 ===
	Round 4
Saturday, 25 May (Time pm)	Adelaide 9.9 (9)	def.	Gawler 1.4 (1)	Adelaide Oval
Saturday, 25 May (3.25 pm)	Port Adelaide 8.3 (8)	def.	South Adelaide 0.2 (0)	Alberton Oval (crowd: 800)
Saturday, 25 May (Time pm)	Norwood 5.13 (5)	def.	Medindie 0.1 (0)	Kensington Oval
The Norwood vs. Medindie both clubs were short of a full team, the game started late and was also played in a half hearten manner - likely due to teams having to play the day before on the Holiday

=== Round 5 ===
	Round 5
Saturday, 8 June (3:18 pm)	Adelaide 3.6 (3)	def.	South Adelaide 1.8 (1)	Adelaide Oval (crowd: 3,500)
	Bye; Port Adelaide, Norwood, Gawler, Medindie
Port Adelaide were on an interstate trip to Victoria.

=== Round 6 ===
	Round 6
Saturday, 15 June (3:10 pm)	Norwood 6.13 (6)	def.	Adelaide 0.2 (0)	Kensington Oval (crowd: 3,500)
Saturday, 15 June (Time pm)	South Adelaide 6.12 (6)	def.	Medindie 0.2 (0)	Adelaide Oval
	Bye; Port Adelaide, Gawler

=== Round 7 (Arbor Day Holiday) ===
	Round 7
Thursday, 20 June (pm)	Norwood 6.6 (6)	def.	Port Adelaide 3.4 (3)	Adelaide Oval (crowd: 8000)
Thursday, 20 June (3pm)	Gawler 4.8 (4)	def.	Medindie 1.6 (6)	Gawler Oval (crowd: 400)

=== Round 7 ===
	Round 7
Saturday, 22 June (3:20 pm)	Medindie 1.5 (1)	def. by	Port Adelaide 7.6 (7)	Adelaide Oval
Saturday, 22 June (3:28 pm)	Norwood 3.4 (3)	def.	South Adelaide 0.5 (0)	Kensington Oval (crowd: 2,000)

=== Round 8 ===
	Round 8
Saturday, 29 June (3:17 pm)	South Adelaide 1.7 (1)	def. by	Port Adelaide 6.9 (6)	Adelaide Oval (crowd: 3,000)
Saturday, 29 June (Time pm)	Norwood 3.12 (3)	def.	Medindie 0.0 (0)	Kensington Oval
6th and 13th July North Melbourne Scheduled to Visit

=== Round 9 ===
	Round 9
Saturday, 20 July (Time pm)	South Adelaide 3.4 (3)	def. by	Port Adelaide 4.9 (4)	Adelaide Oval (crowd: 1,500)
Saturday, 20 July (3:13 pm)	Norwood 3.6 (3)	def. by	Adelaide 6.7 (6)	Kensington Oval (crowd: 600)

=== Round 10 ===
	Round 10
Saturday, 27 July (3:15 pm)	Port Adelaide 3.5 (3)	def.	Norwood 2.6 (2)	Alberton Oval (crowd: 6,500)
Saturday, 27 July (Time pm)	South Adelaide 8.9 (8)	def.	Gawler 0.4 (0)	Kensington Oval (crowd: 250)
Saturday, 27 July (Time pm)	Adelaide 3.12 (3)	def.	Medindie 1.1 (1)	Adelaide Oval
The crowd at the Port Adelaide vs. Norwood game of around 6,500 was the then-record for Alberton Oval.

=== Round 11 ===
	Round 11
Saturday, 3 August (3:15 pm)	Adelaide 5.7 (5)	def.	South Adelaide 2.12 (2)	Kensington Oval (crowd: 2,500)
Saturday, 3 August (Time pm)	Medindie 2.7 (2)	def. by	Norwood 10.10 (10)	Adelaide Oval (crowd: 300)
Saturday, 3 August (3:20 pm)	Port Adelaide 15.17 (15)	def.	Gawler 0.2 (0)	Alberton Oval (crowd: 300)
Charlie Fry kicked 9 goals in Port Adelaide's win over Gawler.

=== Round 12 ===
	Round 12
Saturday, 10 August (3:10 pm)	Adelaide 2.4 (2)	def. by	Port Adelaide 9.18 (9)	Adelaide Oval (crowd: 4,000)
Saturday, 10 August (3:30 pm)	Gawler 2.9 (2)	def. by	Norwood 5.11	Gawler Oval (crowd: 400)

=== Round 13 ===
	Round 13
Saturday, 17 August (3:20 pm)	South Adelaide 1.5 (1)	def. by	Norwood 7.17 (7)	Adelaide Oval (crowd: 800)
Saturday, 17 August (Time pm)	Port Adelaide 12.12 (12)	def.	Medindie 1.1 (1)	Alberton Oval (crowd: 200)
Schedule Program at start of stated South Adelaide vs Norwood was to be played at Kensington

=== Round 14 ===
	Round 14
Saturday, 24 August (3:10 pm)	Norwood 3.7 (3)	drew with	Port Adelaide 3.8 (3)	Adelaide Oval (crowd: 8,000)
Saturday, 24 August (Time pm)	Adelaide 5.6 (5)	def.	Medindie 3.5 (3)	Kensington

=== Round 15 ===
	Round 15
Saturday, 31 August (Time pm)	Adelaide 2.5 (2)	def. by	Port Adelaide 7.13 (7)	Adelaide Oval (crowd: 2,000)

=== Round 16 ===
	Round 16
Monday, 2 September (10:35 am)	Medindie 2.1 (2)	def. by	Gawler 4.6 (4)	Adelaide Oval
Monday, 2 September (3:22 pm)	South Adelaide 6.23 (6)	def.	Adelaide 5.3 (5)	Adelaide Oval (crowd: 4,000)

=== Round 17 ===
	Round 17
Saturday, 7 September (Time pm)	South Adelaide 3.3 (3)	def. by	Port Adelaide 9.10 (9)	Adelaide Oval (crowd: 3,000)
Saturday, 7 September (Time pm)	Gawler 5.14 (5)	def.	Adelaide 2.5 (2)	Gawler Oval (crowd: 400)

=== Round 18 ===
	Round 18
Saturday, 14 September (Time pm)	Adelaide 1.3 (1)	def. by	Norwood 9.5 (9)	Adelaide Oval (crowd: 3,000)
Saturday, 14 September (Time pm)	South Adelaide 5.12 (5)	v	Medindie 2.2 (2)	Kensington Oval (crowd: 50)

=== Round 19 ===
	Round 19
Saturday, 21 September (Time pm)	Adelaide 0.1 (0)	def. by	Port Adelaide 13.13 (13)	Adelaide Oval (crowd: 2,000)
Saturday, 21 September (Time pm)	Medindie 3.12 (3)	def. by	Gawler 4.10 (4)	Kensington Oval

=== Round 20 ===
	Round 20
Saturday, 28 September (3:30 pm)	South Adelaide 2.4 (2)	def. by	Norwood 6.11 (6)	Adelaide Oval (crowd: 2,000)

== Ladder ==
1889 SAFA Ladder
	TEAM	P	W	L	D	GF	BF	GA	BA	Pts	Adj Pts
1	Norwood (P)	17	14	2	1	102	165	30	75	29	29
1	Port Adelaide	17	14	2	1	127	177	33	63	29	29
3	Adelaide	17	8	9	0	57	95	78	161	16	16
4	Gawler	11	4	7	0	21	65	76	104	8	12.36
5	South Adelaide	17	6	11	0	54	132	71	120	12	12
6	Medindie	15	0	15	0	19	56	90	158	0	0
Key: P = Played, W = Won, L = Lost, D = Drawn, GF = Goals For, BF = Behinds For, GA = Goals Against, BA = Behinds Against, Pts = Points, Adj Pts = Points adjusted for match ratio, (P) = Premiers											

Notes: Medindie played each club 3 times
Gawler only played each Club twice except Medindie (3 times)
due to City clubs only wanting to travel once to Gawler due to the cost of the Special Train
The other 4 senior teams - Norwood, Port Adelaide, Adelaide and South Adelaide played each other 4 times.

== Grand final ==
=== 1889 SAFA Premiership Football Match ===
Grand Final
Saturday, 5 October (3:00 pm)	Norwood	def.	Port Adelaide	Adelaide Oval (crowd: 11,000)
3.1 (3); 4.1 (4); 5.3 (5); 7.3 (7)	Q1; Q2; Q3; Final	3.1 (3); 3.3 (3); 4.7 (4); 5.9 (5)
McGaffin, Rawson, Dixon, Daly, J. Woods, Shaw, Roberts, O. Bertram	Best	Hamilton, Kempster, Kwers, Gardiner, Tomlin, J. McKenzie, Phillips, Hills, Fry
