= 1893 SAFA season =

1893 SAFA premiership season
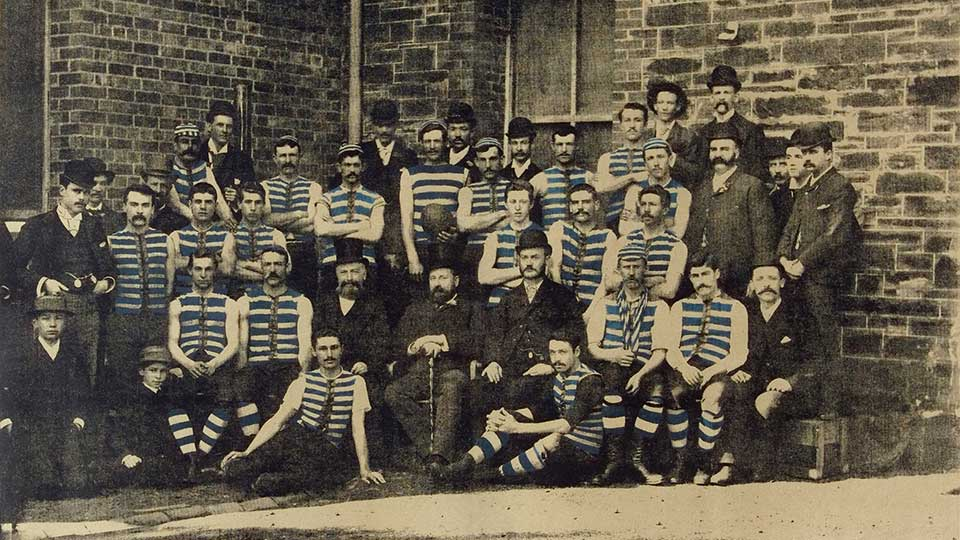
- South Adelaide, premiers
- Teams: 5
- Premiers: South Adelaide; 4th premiership
- Leading goalkicker: Anthony Daly; Norwood (88 goals)
- Matches played: 43
- Highest: 10,000 (30 August, South Adelaide vs. Norwood)

The 1893 South Australian Football Association season was the 17th season of the top-level Australian rules football competition in South Australia.

== Teams ==
Senior Clubs for 1893 Season
Adelaide	North Adelaide	Norwood	Port Adelaide	South Adelaide

=== Medindie renames to North Adelaide ===
Medindie Football Club (nickname Dingoes), which joined the SAFA in 1888, were renamed North Adelaide Football Club on 14 March 1893, at a meeting held at Temperance Hall, North Adelaide.

=== Adelaide and Eastbourne Junior Club Merger ===
The annual meeting of the Eastbourne Football Club was held on March 17, and the secretary in his report stated that they had attained the premiership of the City and Suburban Football Association for 1892, having; played 15 matches, won 12, and drawn 3. During the business a discussion took place as to joining the senior Association, and resulted in a sub-committee being elected to work the matter up by the next meeting.

The Adelaide Football Club, which were Premiers in 1886, and had joined in 1885 after a merger of North Adelaide Juniors and North Park from the Adelaide and Suburban Association, merged with the Eastbourne Football Club, 1891 and 1892 Premiers of the City and Suburban Association, for the 1893 Season. This would be the Adelaide Club's last season as they resigned from the senior Association before the commencement of the 1894 season and folded.

From this point forward, no clubs have left since joining: while Woodville and West Torrens merged in 1991, the SANFL considers Woodville-West Torrens to be a continuation of both Woodville and West Torrens; thus, the Adelaide Football Club which joined in 1885 is the last club to fold and resign from the SAFA.

== Premiership season ==
=== Round 1 ===
	Round 1
Saturday, 6 May	Norwood 12.27 (12)	def.	Adelaide 1.3 (1)	Kensington Oval
Saturday, 6 May	Port Adelaide 13.18 (13)	def.	North Adelaide 2.1 (2)	Adelaide Oval
	Bye; South Adelaide

=== Round 2 ===
	Round 2
Saturday, 13 May	Norwood 21.14 (21)	def.	North Adelaide 1.2 (1)	Kensington Oval (crowd: 100)
Saturday, 13 May	South Adelaide 21.21 (21)	def.	Adelaide 0.0 (0)	Adelaide Oval (crowd: 700)
	Bye; Port Adelaide

=== Round 3 ===
	Round 3
Saturday, 20 May	Norwood 3.11 (3)	def. by	South Adelaide 7.10 (7)	Adelaide Oval
Saturday, 20 May	Port Adelaide 9.11 (9)	def.	Adelaide 0.4 (0)	Alberton Oval
	Bye; North Adelaide

=== Round 4 ===
	Round 4
Wednesday, 24 May (10am)	North Adelaide 4.8 (4)	def.	Adelaide 3.2 (3)	Adelaide Oval
Wednesday, 24 May (3pm)	Port Adelaide 8.5 (8)	def.	South Adelaide 4.6 (4)	Adelaide Oval (crowd: 8,000)
	Bye; Norwood

=== Round 5 ===
	Round 5
Saturday, 27 May	Norwood 30.11 (30)	def.	Adelaide 0.1 (0)	Adelaide Oval
Saturday, 27 May	Port Adelaide 9.10 (9)	def.	North Adelaide 2.3 (2)	Alberton Oval
	Bye; South Adelaide
The Advertiser reported Port Adelaide's score as 9 goals 8 behinds.

=== Round 6 ===
	Round 6
Saturday, 3 June	Norwood 6.8 (6)	def.	Port Adelaide 5.4 (5)	Adelaide Oval
Saturday, 3 June	South Adelaide 9.16 (9)	def.	North Adelaide 2.2 (2)	Kensington Oval
	Bye; Adelaide
The Advertiser reported South Adelaide's score as 9 goals 15 behinds.

=== Round 7 ===
	Round 7
Saturday, 17 June	Norwood 6.3 (6)	drew with	South Adelaide 6.3 (6)	Adelaide Oval (crowd: 5,000)
Saturday, 17 June	Port Adelaide 12.15 (12)	def.	Adelaide 1.0 (1)	Alberton Oval
	Bye; North Adelaide

=== Round 8 ===
	Round 8
Tuesday, 20 June (10am)	Adelaide 2.2 (2)	def.	North Adelaide 0.7 (0)	Adelaide Oval
Tuesday, 20 June (3pm)	Port Adelaide 4.5 (4)	def. by	Norwood 5.9 (5)	Adelaide Oval
	Bye; South Adelaide

=== Round 9 ===
	Round 9
Saturday, 24 June	Norwood 11.9 (11)	def.	North Adelaide 1.4 (1)	Adelaide Oval
Saturday, 24 June	South Adelaide 14.10 (14)	def.	Adelaide 3.6 (3)	Kensington Oval
	Bye; Port Adelaide

=== Round 10 ===
	Round 10
Saturday, 1 July	Port Adelaide 5.3 (5)	def.	Norwood 1.5 (1)	Adelaide Oval (crowd: 6,000)
	Bye; Adelaide, North Adelaide, South Adelaide
The Advertiser reported Norwood's score as 1 goal 6 behinds.

=== Round 11 ===
	Round 11
Saturday, 8 July	North Adelaide 5.6 (5)	def.	Adelaide 1.5 (1)	Kensington Oval
Saturday, 8 July	South Adelaide 8.8 (8)	def.	Port Adelaide 4.6 (4)	Kensington Oval (crowd: 5,000)
	Bye; Norwood
The Advertiser reported North Adelaide's score as 5 goal 4 behinds.

=== Round 12 ===
	Round 12
Saturday, 15 July	North Adelaide 3.3 (3)	def. by	South Adelaide 11.11 (11)	Adelaide Oval
Saturday, 15 July	Port Adelaide 14.22 (14)	def.	Adelaide 2.4 (2)	Kensington Oval
	Bye; Norwood
The Advertiser reported the score of the Port Adelaide v. Adelaide match as 13.16 to 2.3.

=== Round 13 ===
	Round 13
Saturday, 22 July	Norwood 5.5 (5)	drew with	South Adelaide 5.15 (5)	Adelaide Oval (crowd: 5,000)
Saturday, 22 July	Port Adelaide 23.25 (23)	def.	Adelaide 2.0 (2)	Alberton Oval
	Bye; North Adelaide

=== Round 14 ===
	Round 14
Saturday, 29 July	Norwood 10.8 (10)	def.	North Adelaide 5.8 (5)	Kensington Oval (crowd: 100)
Saturday, 29 July	South Adelaide 7.4 (7)	def.	Port Adelaide 5.4 (5)	Adelaide Oval
	Bye; Adelaide

=== Round 15 ===
	Round 15
Saturday, 5 August	Norwood 8.5 (8)	def.	Port Adelaide 6.4 (6)	Adelaide Oval (crowd: 5,000)
Saturday, 5 August	South Adelaide 9.5 (9)	def.	North Adelaide 2.3 (2)	Kensington Oval
	Bye; Adelaide

=== Round 16 ===
	Round 16
Saturday, 12 August	Norwood 20.14 (20)	def.	Adelaide 2.6 (2)	Kensington Oval
Saturday, 12 August	Port Adelaide 6.5 (6)	def.	North Adelaide 5.5 (5)	Adelaide Oval
	Bye; South Adelaide

=== Round 17 ===
	Round 17
Saturday, 19 August	South Adelaide 9.18 (9)	def.	Adelaide 3.0 (3)	Adelaide Oval (crowd: 50)
	Bye; North Adelaide, Norwood, Port Adelaide

=== Round 18 ===
	Round 18
Saturday, 26 August	North Adelaide 5.10 (5)	def.	Adelaide 1.4 (1)	Kensington Oval
Saturday, 26 August	South Adelaide 6.5 (6)	def.	Port Adelaide 5.5 (5)	Adelaide Oval
	Bye; Norwood
The Advertiser reported North Adelaide's score as 4 goals 10 behinds.

=== Round 19 ===
	Round 19
Friday, 1 September	South Adelaide 10.14 (10)	def.	Norwood 9.4 (9)	Adelaide Oval (crowd: 10,000)
	Bye; Adelaide, North Adelaide, Port Adelaide

=== Round 20 ===
	Round 20
Saturday, 2 September	Norwood 14.8 (14)	def.	North Adelaide 6.6 (6)	Adelaide Oval
Saturday, 2 September	South Adelaide	def.	Adelaide
	Bye; Port Adelaide
Adelaide forfeited their scheduled game against South Adelaide

=== Round 21 ===
	Round 21
Saturday, 9 September	Norwood 29.12 (29)	def.	Adelaide 2.4 (2)	Kensington Oval
Saturday, 9 September	Port Adelaide 11.10 (11)	def.	North Adelaide 0.2 (0)	Adelaide Oval
	Bye; South Adelaide

=== Round 22 ===
	Round 22
Saturday, 16 September	South Adelaide 6.10 (6)	drew with	Port Adelaide 6.6 (6)	Adelaide Oval (crowd: 2,000)
	Bye; Adelaide, North Adelaide, Norwood
The draw in this game secured the premiership for South Adelaide

=== Round 23 ===
	Round 23
Saturday, 23 September	Norwood 7.10 (7)	drew with	Port Adelaide 7.3 (7)	Adelaide Oval (crowd: 1,500)
Saturday, 23 September	South Adelaide 16.21 (16)	def.	North Adelaide 0.2 (0)	Kensington Oval
	Bye; Adelaide

=== Round 24 ===
	Round 24
Saturday, 30 September	South Adelaide 5.6 (5)	def. by	Norwood 6.7 (6)	Adelaide Oval (crowd: 1,000)
	Bye; Adelaide, North Adelaide, Port Adelaide

== Ladder ==
1893 SAFA Ladder
	TEAM	P	W	L	D	GF	BF	GA	BA	Pts
1	South Adelaide (P)	18	13	2	3	154	182	68	74	29
2	Norwood	18	12	3	3	203	170	78	101	27
3	Port Adelaide	18	10	6	2	150	163	73	88	22
4	North Adelaide	16	3	13	0	43	72	147	148	6
5	Adelaide	16	1	15	0	23	41	207	217	2
Key: P = Played, W = Won, L = Lost, D = Drawn, GF = Goals For, BF = Behinds For, GA = Goals Against, BA = Behinds Against, (P) = Premiers										

Note - Adelaide and North Adelaide played every club 4 times.
Norwood, Port Adelaide and South Adelaide played each other 5 times whilst they only played Adelaide and North Adelaide 4 times.
