= Lady Kintore Cottages =

Charity

Lady Kintore Cottage Homes was a charitable organisation and housing development founded in the 1890s depression in Adelaide, South Australia. It was named for Lady Kintore, née Sydney Charlotte Montagu (1851–1932), wife of Lord Kintore, Governor of SA 1889–1895.

== History ==
An organisation was formed at a meeting held in September 1892 at the Town Hall, F. W. Bullock, the Mayor of Adelaide presiding, with the aim of forming a Rent Aid society.

Lady Kintore Cottages
1 Original purchases (approx area only)
2 Later site of three cottages

Those present included Her Excellency the Countess of Kintore (wife of the Governor of South Australia), Lady Colton, Miss Baker, Rev. W. R. Fletcher, Canon Sunter, Rabbi Boas, (Methodist) Rev. J. B. Stephenson, J. H. Finlayson, J. Marshall, J. L. Bonython, J. J. Green, Henry Scott, and L. P. Lawrence. A committee was formed consisting of Lady Downer, Lady Colton, Mrs. Birks, Miss Baker, Mrs. D. W. Duffield, Chief Justice Way, Henry Scott, D. Murray. F. W. Bullock, G. C. Knight, J. Marshall, J. J. Green, and J. Moss Solomon (secretary).

Their stated aim was to purchase cottages to be let at economic rents to "deserving widows and deserted women" who might otherwise have no better accommodation than the Destitute Asylum. A typical woman whom the charity would benefit was a widow with four children. She could get employment paying 15/- a week, but rent of a modest residence would cost 9/- per week, leaving little for necessities. An economic rent would cover maintenance, with sufficient left over for a decent, if austere, lifestyle.

The plan called for purchase of cottages in a central location, but the target of £1000 in donations was not reached, so a row of seven "substantially built" three-room cottages in Hackney was purchased. This proved to be a mistake, as almost all employment suitable for a woman of little education was in the city or North Adelaide, which meant that with travelling time added to her hours of work, she had no time for her family. The cottages were sold and land purchased at the O'Brien Street corner of Gilbert Street, where three cottages were built in 1902.

In 1921, by an Act of Parliament (Lady Kintore Cottages Act 1920, No. 1430), ownership of the Cottages was transferred to the Adelaide Benevolent and Strangers' Friend Society (founded 1849), an organisation of similar aims, but having a much larger portfolio of economical housing. Under the new management, two additional cottages were erected using a bequest from Mrs Jane Marks, and the name of Kintore was quietly dropped.

Another two cottages were erected on the Gilbert Street property using a bequest from Mrs A. M. Simpson née Violet Laura Sheridan (died 28 June 1921) and her sister Alice Frances Keith Sheridan (died 25 November 1922), who had also funded the octagonal kiosk at the old Royal Adelaide Hospital.

== See also ==
- Somerset Homes, in Walkerville, the philanthropic project of Charles Drew
