= Ken McKenzie (footballer, born 1865) =

Australian rules footballer (1865–1917)

Personal information
- Full name: Kennith McKenzie
- Nickname: Ken
- Born: 1865
- Died: 3 May 1917 (aged 51–52)
- Original team: Fitzroy (Adelaide)
- Position: Defender

Playing career
Years	Club	Games (Goals)
1886–1900	Port Adelaide	186

Representative team honours
Years	Team	Games (Goals)
1890–1894	South Australia	6

Career highlights
- Club: Port Adelaide captain (1890–1894, 1896-1898); 2× Port Adelaide premiership player (1890, 1897); Championship of Australia (1890); Port Adelaide best and fairest (1897); Representative: 6× games for South Australia; Honours: Port Adelaide life member (1909)

Ken McKenzie (1865–1917) was an Australian rules footballer for the Port Adelaide Football Club. He captained the club for eight years from 1890 to 1894 and 1896–1898. His two brothers, Alec and Jack also played for Port Adelaide.

== Football ==
Ken McKenzie had a successful career with the Port Adelaide Football Club. He won two SAFA premierships during his career, the Championship of Australian against South Melbourne in 1890, the club Best & Fairest in 1897 and was club captain for eight years.

During 1894 he requested a transfer to Norwood after an internal dispute at Port Adelaide. The dispute was eventually resolved and he remained at Port Adelaide.

== Second Boer War ==
Ken McKenzie served in the Second Boer War.

== Later life ==
=== Pretoria ===
Ken McKenzie spent the majority of his life after the Boer War in South Africa. He worked with the South African government.

=== Return to South Australia ===
Shortly before his death he returned to South Australia.
