= L. P. Lawrence =

Australian businessman and philanthropist (1838–1923)

Laurie Phillip Lawrence (1 March 1838 – 14 August 1923) was a businessman and philanthropist in South Australia.

== History ==
Lawrence was born in Dover, England, and was educated at Wanstall's academy, Chatham, Kent. At the age of 15 he left for Australia and the Victorian gold diggings, but had little success. He worked as clerk and storeman on a sheep station near Bathurst and at a softgoods warehouse in Melbourne, where in 1862 he married, before moving to New Zealand, where the Otago gold rush was under way. If he went prospecting success once again eluded him, but he stayed in Dunedin for three years. Somehow that did not work out, and he returned to Australia.

Back in Melbourne, he found employment as a travelling salesman for I. Jacobs & Co., wholesale tobacconists. In 1875 he was appointed manager of their Brisbane office, which was at the time an offshoot of their Sydney branch. He either found that arrangement unsatisfactory, or the climate, and was given management of their Adelaide office, which traded as Feldheim, Jacobs & Co. The company became Jacobs, Hart, & Co. (Adelaide) in 1883, and Lawrence became a partner in the Adelaide firm. In 1888 the Melbourne partnership of Isaac Jacobs (c. 1835–1914) and Alfred David Hart (c. 1849–1928) was dissolved, and Jacobs withdrew from the Adelaide firm, which became Hart, Lawrence & Co., whose establishment included Wm. Cameron & Company's Virginia Tobacco Factory, Grenfell Street, near Hindmarsh Square; Wm. Cameron & Co. being an American company, the factory having been established by Feldheim, Jacobs, & Co. in 1876. His son Philip M. Lawrence was manager of the factory.

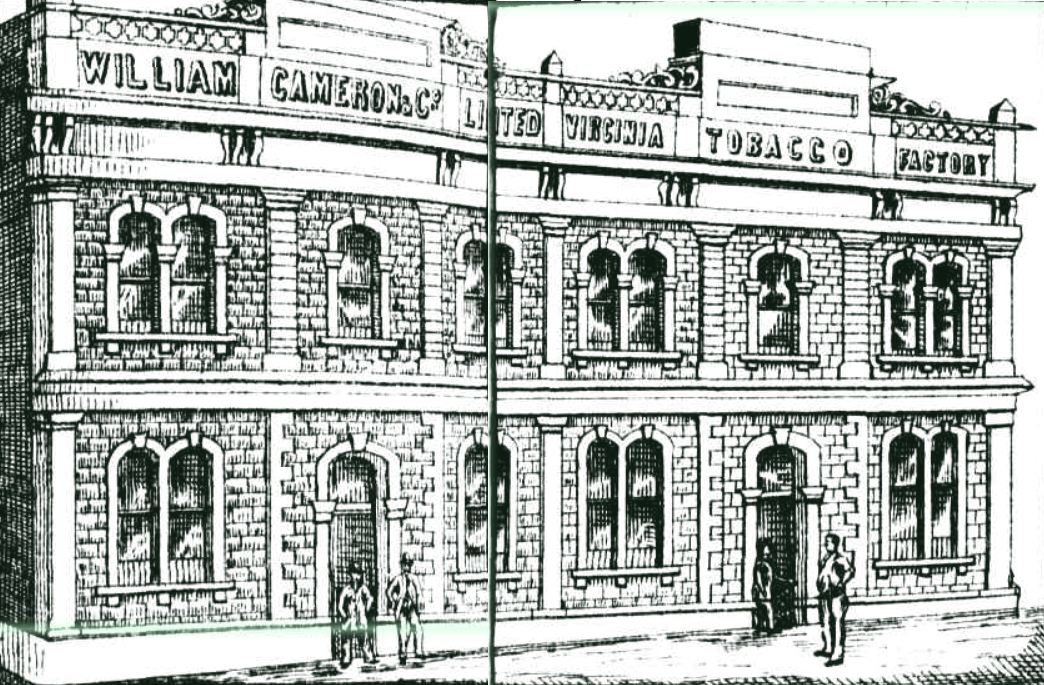
Cameron's Virginia Tobacco Factory

In 1890 Lawrence and son Philip settled a strike by tobacco workers and in 1896 Hart and Lawrence restructured the business as Hart, Lawrence, & Co. Pty, Ltd, with Lawrence as Managing Director. and later still as the States Tobacco Company.

In 1900, with the certain prospect of Federation and the abolition of inter-state duties, there was no longer any advantage to companies having separate factories in each State, and the three Adelaide tobacco factories (Wm. Cameron & Co., H. R. Dixson, and Dungey, Ralph & Co.) sought to cut costs by reducing the men's wages. The unions called a strike, whereupon the owners closed the South Australian factories, and Hart & Lawrence became solely a wholesale outlet for the Victorian manufacturers.

Lawrence retired as a director of States Tobacco in 1904, having been for 20 years closely associated with the mercantile life of South Australia. He was

- a committee member, Adelaide Chamber of Commerce, 1882–1907, and served as its president in 1882 and 1889–90.
- a longtime member of the South Australian Chamber of Manufactures, [1901 1906] for 23 years a member of its committee, and president in 1902–03, and helped organise four of its Exhibitions [1905].
- a member of the General Manufactures Committee organising the Adelaide Jubilee International Exhibition
- a member, Employers' Union of South Australia [1890]
- a director, SA Brewing Company in 1912.
- a director of the Permanent Equitable Building and Investment Society, [1887]
- for 45 years a member of the South Australian Commercial Travellers and Warehousemen's Association, a trustee and vice-patron, was granted life membership, and served as president 1881–84.
- a foundation member and trustee of the Justices' Association, and had served as JP from March 1887.

He was active in a range of philanthropic movements: he was

- a member, Boys Brigade committee 1886–
- a member, Adelaide Children's Hospital [1891] board of management, and served as its Vice-President.
- in 1892 a founding member of Lady Kintore Cottages committee
- a member of the Adelaide Benevolent and Strangers' Friend Society and for many years honorary treasurer.
- on the committee of Minda and the Home for Incurables
- a member of the St John Ambulance Association.

On the social and sporting side he was

- for many years hon. treasurer of the Adelaide Jewish Congregation.
- a member of the Adelaide Literary Society and the Zoological Society
- a life member of the Adelaide Bowling Club
- president of the North Adelaide Baseball Club in 1909, and SA Baseball League
- president, Adelaide Football Club 1885-1891
- chairman of the South Australian Cyclists' Union for several years in the early 1890s.

== Death and recognition ==
Lawrence died at his residence, Melbourne street, North Adelaide, at age of 85 years.

He was highly respected as a gentleman and citizen, and was mourned by a wide circle of friends.

== Family ==
Lawrence married Frances "Fanny" Anderson (c. 1835 – 27 January 1894) on 23 September 1862. they had four sons and two daughters:—

- Philip M. Lawrence ( – ) was manager of William Cameron & Co.'s tobacco factory, married Emelie "Amy" Jacobsen on 27 June 1894 at the Melbourne synagogue.
- second son Edgar L. Lawrence (17 March 1866 – 24 May 1933) married Rachel Adelaide "Rae" Solomon (9 September 1866 – 6 July 1945) on 28 October 1891. Edgar was with Kronheimer Ltd, then Perth manager, W. D. & H. O. Wills.
- eldest daughter Flora Lawrence married Harry Philip Hayman on 29 January 1884, lived in London. He was partner in Hayman Brothers of King William Street.
- Percy J. A. Lawrence (7 November 1873 – 10 November 1938) married Elsie. He was commercial broker, member of Prices Regulation Tribunal 1919, chairman, board of directors Harris, Scarfe Ltd. Owner of "Panmure" mansion, Stirling, and several city buildings: King's Theatre and Panmure Building.
- (Stephen) Gilbert Lawrence (3 July 1877 – 1952) was engaged to Hannah Davis of Dunedin in May 1898 but married Florence ( – 2 October 1938). He was a tobacconist, with premises on the corner of King William and Rundle streets.
- youngest daughter Eunice Lawrence (12 March 1880 – ) was engaged to one Jacobson of Melbourne in 1910, but never married.

They had a home, "Chatham" on Melbourne Street (first from Brougham Place, facing south).
