= Adelaide Football Club (SAFA) =

Former Australian rules football club

Adelaide

Names
- Full name: Adelaide Football Club

Club details
- Founded: 5 March 1885
- Dissolved: 9 March 1894; 132 years ago
- Colours: black, red
- Competition: SAFA 1885-1893
- Premierships: SAFA (1): 1886
- Ground: Adelaide Oval

Uniforms
Home

The Adelaide Football Club, was an Australian rules football club based in North Adelaide, South Australia that competed in the South Australian Football Association from 1885 to 1893. The club was admitted to the SAFA in 1885 following a merger of the two strongest clubs from the Adelaide and Suburban Association, North Adelaide Junior (renamed Adelaide in 1884) who were the runners up and North Park the 1884 premiers. The new Adelaide senior club won the SAFA premiership in 1886, in just their second season, against the older established SAFA clubs of Norwood, Port Adelaide and South Adelaide who had dominated the competition since it formed in 1877.

== Background and Brief History ==
In 1884, the North Adelaide Junior Club from the Adelaide and Suburban Association renamed themselves Adelaide. They were runner up in the competition and at the end of the season and proposed a merger with the premiers North Parks. In early 1885, the two clubs agreed on a merger and submitted an application for a senior side to the join the SAFA as Adelaide and to wear the old Adelaide colours of Black and Red. The merged club was proudly formed from South Australian born players. They retained a junior team called North Park in the Adelaide and Suburban Association. The following year this team would be renamed Adelaide Juniors. In their first year in the SAFA they were competitive at times winning 4 games but would collect the wooden spoon but the following year won the 1886 SAFA premiership. Following a loss of key players to other clubs after their initial success they collected the wooden spoon in 1891 and 1892 failing to win a single game in both seasons. Prior to the commencement of the 1893 season the Eastbourne junior club, the premiers of the City and Suburban Association in 1891 and 1892, merged with Adelaide. The merged club won one game but again collected the wooden spoon. The Adelaide club resigned in writing from the SAFA in March 1894 before the commencement of the season and disbanded permanently with Eastbourne rejoining the City and Suburban Association.

The old Adelaide Football Club (SAFA 1877–1881) and the Adelaide Football Club (SAFA 1885–1893) have no relationship to the Adelaide Football Club currently playing in the Australian Football League (AFL) or to the Adelaide Reserves in the South Australian National Football League (SANFL).

=== North Adelaide Junior Club renames to Adelaide (1884) ===
On 20 March 1884, a delegate for the North Adelaide Juniors was present at the Medindie Football Club Annual Meeting and proposed an amalgamation with the Medindies, which was respectfully declined. The Medindie Club would later join the SAFA in 1888 and rename to North Adelaide Football Club in 1893.

On Monday evening, 24 March 1884 North Adelaide Junior Club held its annual general meeting at the Prince Alfred Hotel. Mr. C. C. Cornish, one of the Vice Presidents, occupied the chair. There was an attendance of forty-one members, and it was decided to alter the name of the club to the Adelaide Football Club. Twelve new members were elected, and the report and balance sheet, showing a satisfactory credit balance, was read and adopted. Votes of thanks were passed to the retiring officers, and the following were elected as officers for the ensuing season :— Patron— Hon. G. C. Hawker. President— Mr. W. P. Wicksteed. Vice Presidents— Drs. Stirling, Nesbitt, and Jay, Messrs. W. J. Peterswald, J. F. Wiglev, C.C. Cornish, E. W. Hawker, H. Mildred, J.H. Parr. W. King, C. B. Young, J. H. Wicksteed, V. Lawrance, T. Evans, F. E. Bucknail, and A. Harvey. Secretary — A. Gill. Treasurer— G. M. Austey. Captain— G. M. Evan. Committee — Secretary, Treasurer, Captain, F. Fiveash, and F. Hamilton. Match Committee— Captain, P. S, Hocking, and R. E. P. Osborne.

=== Adelaide Annual Dinner 1884 ===
The first annual dinner of the new Adelaide Football Club was held in the Parisian Cafe, Rundle-street, on Thursday evening 11 September 1884. Mr. W. P. Wicksteed presided, and Mr. E. W. Hawker, M.P., occupied the vice-chair. About forty sat down to dinner. Mr. J. D. Stephens, who, in a highly eulogistic speech, complimented the Adelaides on their position, and said he thought much of their success was due to the efforts of their Captain Mr. M. Evan and their Secretary Mr. Gill.

=== Merger with North Parks (1884–1885) ===
In 1884 the Adelaide Club finished in 2nd place (10 Wins 2 Losses) behind North Parks (11 Wins 1 Lost) who won the Adelaide and Suburban Junior Association Premiership. During the season the new Adelaide Club defeated Kensington 9 goals 19 behinds to 1 behind.

A meeting of delegates from the Adelaide (formerly North Adelaide Junior) and North Park (formed in 1878) Football Clubs was held on Thursday evening, 13 November 1884, to consider the desirability of amalgamation. A motion to amalgamate was passed, subject, however, to the final acceptance of the same by a majority of the whole of the members composing the joint clubs. The Adelaide and North Park Junior clubs consisted of a large number of ex collegians from both Prince Alfred and Saint Peters Colleges.

Following a well attended meeting at the Prince Albert Hotel on Thursday 5 March 1885 it was resolved the combined football clubs Adelaide and North Parks would enter two teams - senior portion as Adelaide in the SAFA and the junior as North Parks in Adelaide and Suburban Football Association (ASFA) for the 1885 Season. The old Adelaide colours of Red and Black were adopted.

An internal match of the two clubs was played on Saturday 11 April 1885 at the old North Parks oval. Sides were chosen by Adelaide Club captain J. D. Stephens and vice-captain G. M. Evan, and the ball was started by the president of the club, Mr. L. P. Lawrence.

The new senior Adelaide Team was made up of the top players from the Adelaide (formerly North Adelaide Juniors) and North Parks and together with several players from the senior North Adelaide (originally called Victorians) and South Park Clubs which both had disbanded after the end of the 1884 Season.

One of the notable senior experienced players to join the new Adelaide senior club was South Park Captain Aldam Murr "Pet" Pettinger. He became Vice Captain of Adelaide and was the first SAFA player to reach the 100 game milestone. Pettinger represented South Australia in cricket, Australian rules football, baseball and bowls, was a leading local lacrosse player, golfer, steeplechase rider, an excellent gun shot, and bred and trained hunting dogs. On his death in 1950, Pettinger was referred to as "the grand old man of South Australian sport".

=== SAFA 1885 entry, 1886 Premiers, wins over Carlton and British Lions (1885–1888) ===
At the annual meeting of the S.A. Football Association which was held at the Prince Alfred Hotel, on Wednesday evening 15 April 1885, the application to join from the newly merged Adelaide (formerly North Adelaide Juniors) and North Parks was approved.

Adelaide was involved in an experimental night game played under electric lights at Adelaide Oval on 1 July 1885. It beat South Adelaide 1 goal 8 behinds to 8 behinds.

The new senior team finished last and collected the wooden spoon out of four teams in 1885, but surprised much of the competition to claim the SAFA premiership in 1886 under the captaincy of J. D. Stephens and former South Park Captain A.M. Pettinger as Vice Captain.

=== 1886 Premiership Team ===
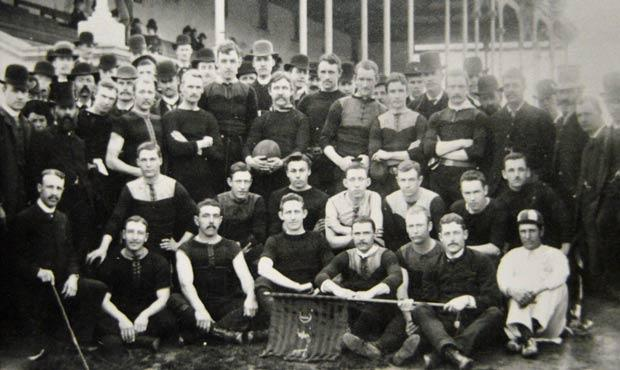
J.Acraman, Esq (Patron), L.P. Lawrence (President), J. Marshall, Esq (Vice President), R. Lewis (Hon Secretary), W.H. Sharland, Jun (Hon Treasurer), J. D. Stephens (C), A.M. Pettinger (VC), A. Clarke, J. Coonan, A.P. Cox, D.G. Evan, G.M. Evan, L.W. Evan, E. Giles, F. Hamilton, H. Hamilton, R. Hooper, A.E. King, H.P. King, A. Mole, J. Phillips, W. Reid, H. Rounsevell, A. Salom, R.B. Scott, F. Sharland, S. Smith, R. Stephens, F. W. Warren, D. Green (Trainer), John Sidoli (Umpire).

=== 1887 Victorian Interstate Trip ===
The Club toured Victoria in May/June for 12 days and played six matches, winning two, drawing one, and losing three. One of the loses was against an elect team chosen from Tasmania in front of a crowd of 5000 at the Melbourne Cricket Ground.

A full playing list with descriptions of their skills and positions was published in a Melbourne paper of the visiting Adelaide Team - The Herald on 26 May 1887. One of the players was a young Joe Darling, future Australian Test Cricket Captain, who was described as a goal sneak, grand mark, very unselfish and an unerring drop kick.

Following the premiership success in 1886, Adelaide remained competitive and finished third out of seven teams in each of the next three seasons (1887–1889), also playing matches against the visiting Victorian Football Association (VFA) premiers Carlton in 1887, winning nine goals to three.

=== 1888 Victory against an English Rugby Team (British Lions) ===
Adelaide defeated a England Footballers visiting rugby team in 1888, winning six goals to three.

Adelaide
Thursday, 12 July,	Adelaide	def.	British Isles	Adelaide Oval (crowd: 3,000)	Report
2.6; 2.9; 5.12; 6.13	Q1; Q2; Q3; Final	0.0; 3.1; 3.5; 3.6	Umpires: Blackman
McIntyre 2, Carter 2, Holbrook, Shawyer	Goals	AE Stoddart 2, WH Thomas

=== Merger with Hotham North Adelaide (1889) ===
On 22 March 1889 at a special meeting held at the Builders' Exchange, Greeham Street, in adjoining rooms the Adelaide and Hotham Clubs (which had spent two seasons 1887–1888 in the SAFA) both met. It was unanimously decided at each meeting that the two clubs should unite as one body. The merged club retained the name Adelaide and red and black as its colours. It was virtually a new team in 1889, with a number of players transferring to other clubs and having taken the best of the Hotham North Adelaide's as a result of the merger. During the 1889 Season the Club went on a tour of Victoria and played games against N.Melbourne, South Ballarat, Maryborough and the Sandhurst Association.

After the triumphs of 1886 and 1887, very poor management led to the defection of many of the key members of the 1886 premiership team.

==== 1890 ====
The 1890 Annual General meeting was held at the Builders' Exchange, Gresham Street with about sixty members present. It was reported that the club had a heavy loss financially the year before due to the Victorian trip. The previous season there was over 100 pounds on hand. Patron of the club was Mr. J. Acraman. Adelaide recruited key forward Alexander McKenzie from Port Adelaide. Club finished 4th, behind Port, Norwood and South Adelaide with 5 wins 10 losses and 2 draws.

=== Rapid decline and dissolution of the Club (1891–1894) ===
From the 1891 season, the club was the chopping block of the SAFA, after its best players had been touted to joined the other clubs and it struggled to field a competitive team against the other senior clubs. In its final three seasons the club won just one game, drew one and lost 45.

==== 1891 ====
By 1891, Adelaide were virtually a new team of players compared to the team that won the Premiership in 1886. It was reported at the end of the season they have not had one of past seasons players playing with them right through the season, although they have had three or four to assist them occasionally, and deserve credit for sticking together. They are a young lot, are fast, have plenty of pluck, but lack judgment and combination, and do not keep their places, Several of them give promise of being noted players when they gain experience. Several members of the Eastbourne Football Club, after they had won the premiership of the City and Suburban Association, threw in their lot with the red and blacks. Alexander McKenzie returned to Port Adelaide after the 1890 season.
Collected wooden spoon - 0 wins 16 Losses

==== 1892 ====
Annual Meeting was held at the Exchange Hotel on Friday evening 18 March 1892. The election of officers resulted in :—Patron, Mr. J. Acraman; president, Mr. Jas. Marshall. Mr. L. P. Lawrence, who had occupied the position of president of the club since its inception, desired not to be re-elected, as pressure of business would not allow him to give that attention to the office he would like, but expressed his intention to still taking a great interest in the club's welfare. Collected wooden spoon - 0 win 15 losses, 1 draw

==== 1893 (Merger with Eastbourne) ====
In April, Adelaide had opened up negotiations with the Eastbourne and College Park Clubs with a view to amalgamation and prior to the commencement of the season the Eastbourne junior club, the premiers of the City and Suburban Association in 1891 and 1892, merged with Adelaide. It gained A Bruce, J Mullaney, J Cullen, A Brailey, Tom Moloney and Forrester from Eastbourne. It also gained Shard from Medindie and Brimble and Conley from Marryatville. Adelaide kept Osborne, Stennett, Medley, A Smith, Fraser and A Lamb from its 1892 team but lost Hall to Norwood.

The team was very youthful and consequently inexperienced, but sometimes caused trouble with clever passing. It had difficulties caused through the players not keeping their places for a whole match. The best players for the season were Cullen, Shard, Stennet, Mullaney, Moloney, Hawkins, Osborne, Ryan, Simpson, Bruce and McKenzie. Top goalkicker for the season was Cullen with six goals followed by Matson with five goals.

Adelaide collected its third successive wooden spoon with 1 win and 15 losses. The club was in a decimated condition once again and was a plaything at the hands of the older senior clubs of South Adelaide, Norwood and Port Adelaide. The cadging or touting system which flourished two years ago, played havoc with the poor Adelaides. Their leading men were enticed from them by cunning and well-paid touts and stripped them bare. With no money it had sought to be brave and with indomitable energy carried on. The team was commended for its pluck with the scoring against it. In the last 3 seasons it had 1 win, 1 draw and 46 losses, which included a winless streak of 40 matches between 1890 and 1893. With these on-field performances and the club being insolvent, it was becoming highly likely that the Adelaide Club would drop out of the SAFA and fold at the end of the 1893 season.

==== 1894 ====
At a meeting of the committee of the SAFA on Monday evening 9 March 1894, it was reported Mr. B. Shepley (Secretary of the Adelaide Football Club) wrote giving notice that his club wished to retire from the senior Association. The club regretted the circumstance and wished the Association every success.

The Eastbourne Football Club on 18 April 1894 applied for readmission to the City and Suburban Association and were accepted.

At a meeting of the SAFA on 30 April 1894 a motion was passed "That the Adelaide Club, having disbanded the members, have the consent of the Association to play for any other club in the Association."

== Honour boards ==
Adelaide Football Club honour board
Year	Position	Record	Chairman	Secretary	Captain	Leading Goalkicker
1884	2 (Adelaide and Suburban Assoc.)	10-2-0		A. Gill	G.M. Evan	Total goals 46
1885	4 (Wooden Spoon)	4–11–0	L.P. Lawrence	R.Lewis	J.D. Stephens	Darwent (10)
1886	1 (SAFA Premiers)	9–5–1	L.P. Lawrence	R. Lewis	J.D. Stephens	Richard Stephens (17)
1887	3	9–4–3	L.P. Lawrence	R. Lewis	J.D. Stephens	Richard Stephens (23)
1888	3	10–7–0	L.P. Lawrence	R. Lewis	J.D. Stephens	H. Richards (16)
1889	3	8–9–0	L.P. Lawrence		A. McIntryre	Darwent (8)
1890	4	5–10–2	L.P. Lawrence	W. Kekwick		Crane (9)
1891	5 (Wooden Spoon)	0–16–0	L.P. Lawrence			Hall (6)
1892	5 (Wooden Spoon)	0–15–1	Jas. Marshall	E. E. Everett		
1893	5 (Wooden Spoon)	1–15–0		B. Shepley (1894)		Cullen (6)

== Notes and references ==
Preceded by South Adelaide	SAFA Premiers; 1886	Succeeded by Norwood
