= Ross Moyle =

Australian cricketer

Personal information
- Full name: Edward James Ross Moyle
- Born: 15 October 1913; Moonta Mines, South Australia
- Died: 24 October 1942 (aged 29); Cairo, Egypt
- Batting: Right handed
- Role: Batsman

Domestic team information
- Years: Team
- 1933/34-1939/40: South Australia

Career statistics
| Competition | First-class |
|---|---|
| Matches | 15 |
| Runs scored | 496 |
| Batting average | 26.10 |
| 100s/50s | –/2 |
| Top score | 98 |
| Balls bowled | – |
| Wickets | – |
| Bowling average | – |
| 5 wickets in innings | – |
| 10 wickets in match | – |
| Best bowling | – |
| Catches/stumpings | 15/1 |
- Source: Cricinfo, 23 August 2020

Ross Moyle (15 October 1913 – 24 October 1942) was an Australian cricketer. He played in fifteen first-class matches for South Australia between 1933 and 1940.

Moyle enlisted in the Australian armed forces and served as a sergeant in the 2/8 Field Ambulance Australian Army Medical Corps in the North Africa campaign. During the Second Battle of El Alamein Moyle was wounded in his abdomen and right thigh and died of his wounds in Cairo. He was Mentioned in Dispatches for his gallantry.

== See also ==
- List of South Australian representative cricketers

== Sources ==
- Growden, G. (2019) Cricketers at War, ABC Books: Sydney. ISBN 9780733339929.
