= Kensington Oval, Adelaide =

Cricket ground in Adelaide, South Australia

Coordinates: 34°55′18″S 138°39′10″E

Kensington Oval
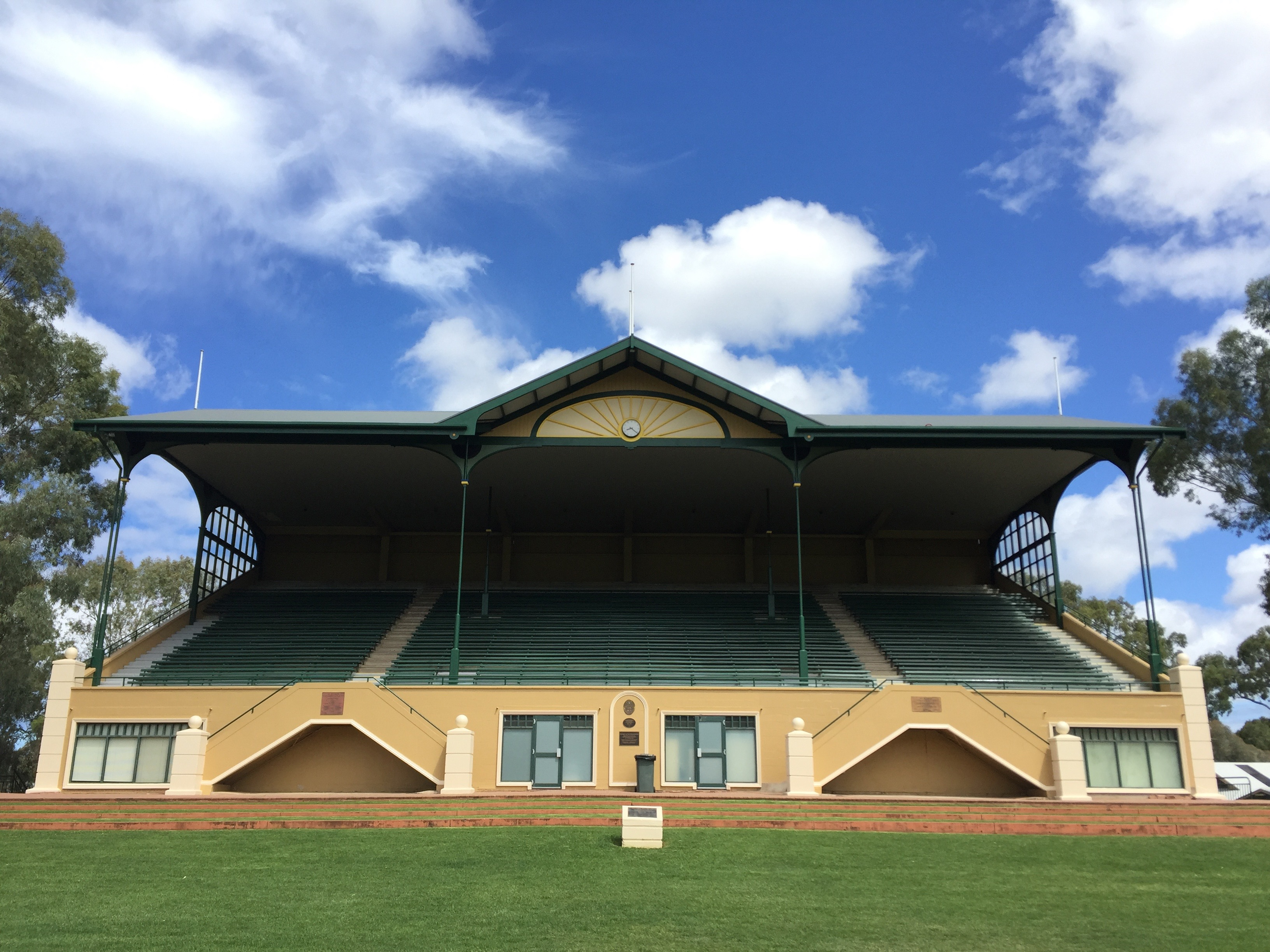
- Interactive map of Kensington Oval
- Former names: Olympic Sports Field (1963-1994)
- Capacity: 5,000
- Record attendance: 13,132 – Adelaide City vs Sydney Marconi, 1977
- Field size: 153m x 119m
- Field shape: Oval

Construction
- Opened: 10 July 1875

Tenant
- Kensington Districts Cricket Club

The Kensington Oval is located on 344 The Parade, Kensington, South Australia. Now used primarily for cricket in South Australia, the venue was once Adelaide's premier athletics facility and known as Olympic Sports Field.

== Early history ==
From an area originally known as Shipsters Paddock, Kensington Oval was officially opened for play on Saturday afternoon, 10 July 1875 by the Hon. L. Glyde, the President of the Kensington Athletic Association.

The ground was originally used for a range of sports including Australian Rules Football and Tennis. Annual Athletics Sports Carnivals were also held at the venue. The Kensington Football Club and the Norwood Football Club, along with other SAFA teams played regularly at the oval between 1875 and 1897 as an alternate venue to Adelaide Oval.

The Norwood Cycle and Motor Club, now Norwood Cycling Club, the oldest cycling club in the Southern Hemisphere, had its opening day celebrations at the oval on 4 February 1884.

== Kensington Districts Cricket Club ==
As the home ground of the Kensington Districts Cricket Club, Sir Donald Bradman played there often after joining the Kensington club upon his move to Adelaide from Sydney in 1935. In 1937 one district cricket match had three Australian Test cricketers participating - Sir Donald Bradman as Captain and Clarrie Grimmett a leg spinner for Kensington, two out of the initial ten Australian Cricket Hall of Fame inductees in 1996, and Clayvel Lindsay "Jack" Badcock a former Tasmanian who opened the batting for Adelaide. In 1939, Bradman scored 303 in 226 minutes (41 fours and 1 six), after being dropped on 7 at first slip, in a district game against Glenelg breaking the club record which was previously 222 by Ross Moyle.

== South Australian Football Association Ground (SAFA and SANFL) and Kensington Cricket Club ==
In addition to the Norwood Football Club the oval was regularly used by all SAFA (now SANFL) clubs for matches up until the 1897 season after which games were played at the newly opened Jubilee Oval in Adelaide.

It was reported in 1922 - The effort of the enthusiasts who are endeavoring to rejuvenate the Kensington Oval was evidenced on Saturday, when the South Adelaides played a practice-game with their B team on the ground. The Souths are therefore the first league team to encourage the resurrection of one of the finest ovals of old times.

It was reported in 1925 - Kensington Oval, one of the finest grounds in the State, is practically going to waste. The famous Norwood redlegs played football at Kensington for many years and a great number of historic associations are attached to the ground. About 25 years ago, however, on the contention that Kensington Oval was inaccessible, the red-and-blues transferred to the Norwood Oval, and the Kensington arena was almost untouched for many years.

Despite an offer from the South Australian Soccer authorities, the Kensington Club, being supporters of the Australian game of football, gave to the Football League the right to play football at Kensington for the next 20 years. This season South B have made the oval their headquarters, and B grade matches have been played there.

Five years ago when the Kensington Cricket Club came into existence in B grade an energetic committee, at first consisting of Messrs. J. N. Jackson, S. Williams (a former Norwood footballer), A. Ballans, J.Keogh (secretary), and J. A. Bahr (the well-known former Norwood captain), secured a five years' lease of the oval from the Burnside Council with the right of renewal for a further 20 years. Mr. Keogh was stated that a large sum had been spent by the Kensington Cricket Club on improving the ground. Some of the main items of expense are new water service, £100; new fence round the playing area, £280; purchase of old smokers' pavilion front Cricket Association and removal and re-erection at Kensington, £250; laying on of deep drainage, £500 (of which the Burnside Council paid about £200); ploughing and rolling playing area, £100; building up mounds, £250.

== SANFL returns to Kensington Oval (1945) ==
SANFL matches returned to Kensington Oval in the 1945 Season when the SANFL signed a five year lease with Burnside City Council and Norwood playing 3 of their home games at the oval. The ground and facilities had been upgraded by Burnside City Council for the upcoming season. The ground was described as better than any suburban ground in Victoria or Western Australia by Haydn Bunton Sr. The first senior football game for 47 years was played on 12 May 1945 when Kensington Oval was declared re-opened by the Governor Sir Willoughby Norrie, who bounced the ball before the start of the Norwood-Port game. His, Excellency passed through an avenue of honor formed by children from Burnside and Marryatville Schools.

From the 1946 Season various fixtures involving all clubs played at Kensington until the 1963 season. The last game being Glenelg Football Club vs North Adelaide Football Club in Round 19 on 31 August 1963.

The highest SAFA Score at Kensington was achieved by South Adelaide Football Club who scored 25 goals and 31 Behinds (181 Points) defeating West Torrens Football Club who scored a single Behind (1 point) in Round 4 of the 1897 SAFA season.

== Olympic Sports Field ==
From 1963, the ground was converted into an athletics stadium, featuring a rubber-bitumen track. In 1975, the track was upgraded to tartan track.

As Olympic Sports Field, the ground was home to Athletics South Australia's interclub athletics competition from October to March and the South Australian Championships. A number of Australian Championships; in 1967, 1968, 1970, 1974, 1975, 1981, 1986 and 1992, were also held at the venue.

The ground was also home to the Adelaide City soccer club and, in 1977, a game against Sydney Marconi saw a record crowd of 13,132.

== Redevelopment as Kensington Oval ==
In the 1990s, a new home for South Australian athletics, Santos Stadium, was built and the oval was returned to a sports playing field, which is held in trust by the City of Burnside and is currently leased for specific hours of (school term) use by the nearby Pembroke School. The running track was removed in 1997 and the ground was redeveloped as a cricket ground. Its original name of Kensington Oval was revived and the ground now plays host to grade and women's cricket matches.
