= Alberton Oval =

Sports venue in Adelaide, South Australia

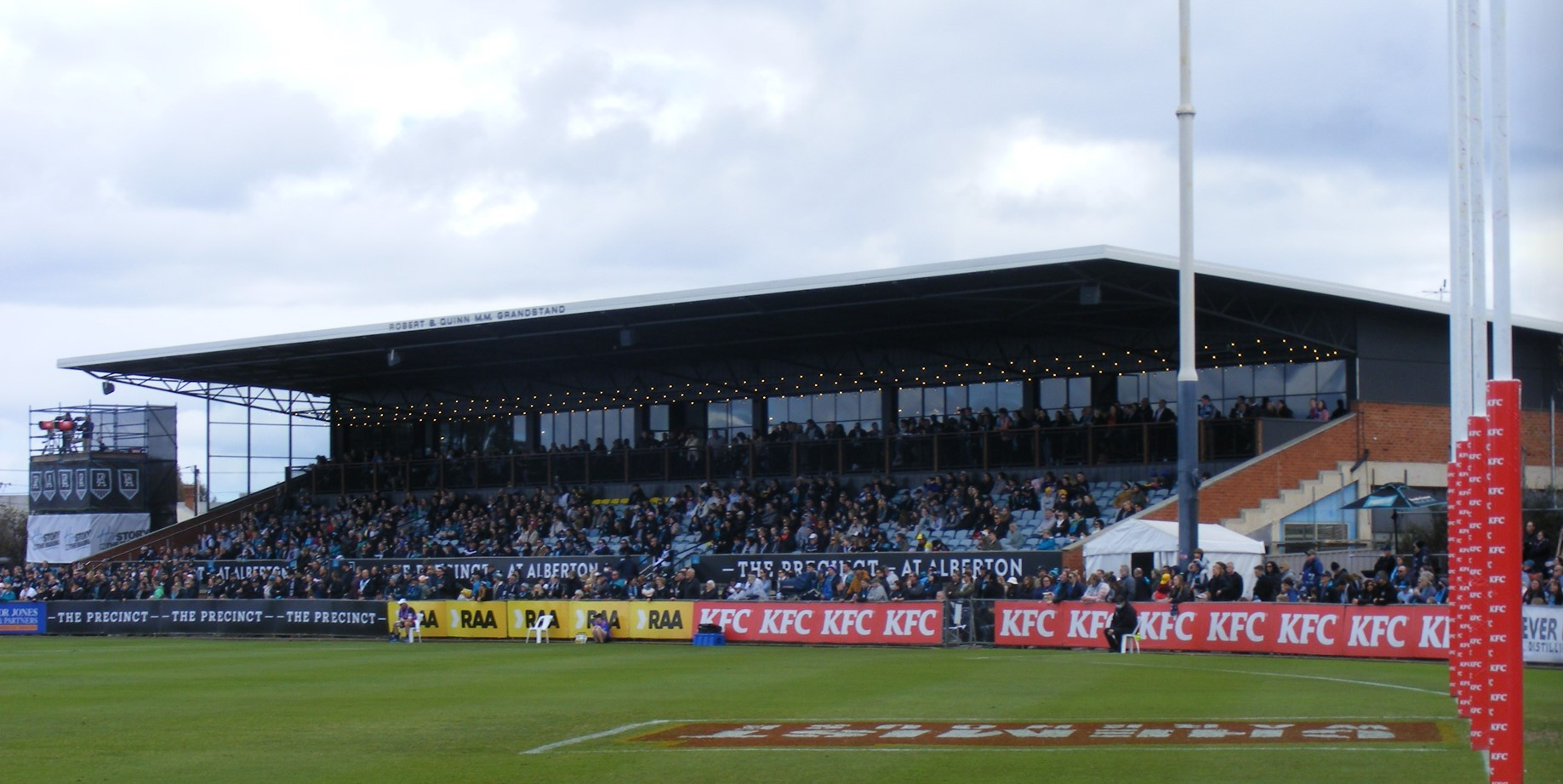
- Partial view of Alberton Oval looking toward the Robert B. Quinn MM Grandstand
- Interactive map of Alberton Oval
- Former names: Queen and Albert Oval
- Location: cnr Brougham Place and Queen St, Alberton, South Australia
- Coordinates: 34°51′52″S 138°31′10″E
- Owner: City of Port Adelaide Enfield
- Operator: Port Adelaide Football Club
- Capacity: 8,000
- Surface: Grass
- Record attendance: 22,738 (Port Adelaide vs Norwood, 11 June 1977)
- Field size: 170 by 130 metres (185.9 yd × 142.2 yd)
- Public transit: Cheltenham Station; Alberton Station

Construction
- Groundbreaking: 1877
- Opened: 8 November 1877 (149 years ago)
- Cost: Property: Donated by John Formby. Construction: £500

Tenants
- Port Adelaide Football Club; Administration & Training (1880–present); SANFL (1880–present); AFL (1997–present); AFLW (2022–present); Port Adelaide Cricket Club (1896–1996)

Alberton Oval is a sports oval located in Alberton, a north-western suburb of Adelaide, South Australia. It has been the home of the Port Adelaide Football Club since 1880. The ground is a public park and is exclusively leased to Port Adelaide for Australian rules football.

== History ==
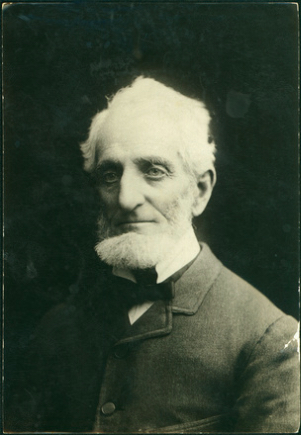
John Formby donated the land for Alberton Oval to the people of Port Adelaide for a sporting oval.

With the nearby Queenstown Oval built upon in 1876, the Alberton and Queenstown Council opted to construct a cricketing ground on the land adjacent Brougham Place in 1876. The land was donated by the former Mayor of Port Adelaide, John Formby. The Queen and Albert Oval was officially opened on 8 November 1877 for a game between the touring Tasmanian cricket team and a selected eleven of the Queen and Albert Cricket Association.

== Port Adelaide Football Club ==
While several teams played at the Alberton Oval in the ground's early days, it is most famous for being the training and administration base for the Port Adelaide Football Club since it played its first game on 15 May 1880 and defeated the original, now-defunct Kensington Football Club 1-nil.

Port Adelaide has played all its South Australian National Football League (SANFL) home games at the ground since 1880. When the club commenced playing in the Australian Football League (AFL) in 1997, it played home matches at Football Park in West Lakes, until 2014 when AFL matches were moved to the Adelaide Oval near the city. The club continued fielding a team in the SANFL after accession to the AFL, and continued to play home matches at Alberton Oval. Initially the SANFL team was legally separate from the club's AFL operations, until the two were re-unified in 2010. Since 2014 Port Adelaide's SANFL team has been a reserve team for the club. The club commenced fielding a women's team in the AFL Women's league in 2022, and play home matches at Alberton Oval.

All of the club's teams, including its AFL, AFLW and SANFL teams, conduct their principal trainings at the ground.

The Allan Scott Power Headquarters stands adjacent to the oval. So too does The Port Club, a social venue for the club's supporters and players, which was opened on 14 November 1954.

Alberton is regarded as the "spiritual home" of Port Adelaide due to the club (in the SANFL) playing almost all of their homes games there since commencing its tenancy. The club's AFL team usually plays one or two trial games at the ground during the pre-season.

Many notable Australian rules footballers have played for Port Adelaide on the ground, including 3 time Brownlow and Sandover Medalist Haydn Bunton Sr, four time SANFL Magarey Medal winner and club games record holder (392) Russell Ebert, nine time premiership coach Fos Williams, local junior and future Carlton player Craig Bradley, 1992 Best and Fairest winner Nathan Buckley, 1993 Brownlow Medallist Gavin Wanganeen and Port Adelaide's first ever AFL coach, John Cahill who also coached the club to 10 SANFL premierships.

=== Cheltenham Cemetery curse ===
For a long time such was the Port Adelaide Football Club's dominance at Alberton Oval with a win percentage of 78% from its first year at the ground in 1880 to joining the AFL in 1997 there has been conjecture that opposition teams became cursed as they passed by Cheltenham Cemetery on the way to the ground.

Your fellows are beaten as soon as they pass the Cheltenham Cemetery.

— Unknown Port Adelaide player, Adelaide Advertiser, 10 May 1946,

Malcolm Blight as coach for Woodville played up the curse for his players in the lead up to a match, parking the bus before the cemetery, and making his players walk past Cheltenham Cemetery. Unfortunately it didn't work and Woodville still lost but Blight suggests his team would've lost by more if he didn't make everyone walk past.

The adage, you lose five goals every time you came to Alberton Oval as soon as you passed Cheltenham Cemetery.

— Malcolm Blight, Sportsday SA, 2 July 2018,

=== Interstate pre-season matches ===
- 1888 September 17 – Port Adelaide vs. Broken Hill
- 1913 July 26 – Port Adelaide vs. North Fremantle
- 1925 August 25 – Port Adelaide vs. South Fremantle
- 1931 October 15 – Port Adelaide vs. Geelong
- 1968 – Port Adelaide vs. Melbourne
- 1968 – Port Adelaide vs. South Melbourne
- 1969 March 22 – Port Adelaide vs. Melbourne
- 1971 March 14 – Port Adelaide vs. Melbourne
- 1979 March 31 – Port Adelaide vs. Footscray
- 1981 March 14 – Port Adelaide vs. Richmond
- 1982 March 13 – Port Adelaide vs. Richmond
- 1997 February 9 – Port Adelaide vs. Richmond
- 2014 March 8 – Port Adelaide vs. St Kilda
- 2019 March 9 – Port Adelaide vs. North Melbourne

=== Redevelopment through the 2020s ===
In 2021, Port Adelaide club officials revealed plans for a redevelopment of Alberton Oval and the surrounding precinct, to include an additional indoor training and administration venue for football, which would feature two basketball courts and an adjacent outdoor soccer pitch. Upgrades to the existing change-rooms and training buildings for men's and women's players were also proposed, as well as spectator amenities and additional spaces for parked cars. The plans were opposed by many local residents who were troubled by the loss of the public park and removal of a dozen significant trees, while others claimed it would exacerbate traffic congestion in the area, though club officials pointed to the expanded car-park spaces available for staff and players, and the opportunities available for local community sports groups to utilise the facilities. The proposal was granted approval by the City of Port Adelaide Enfield council on 9 November 2021. The overall cost of the redevelopment was $30 million, of which $15 million was financed from the federal government in an announcement made on 27 November 2021. The other half of the cost was raised by the South Australian government's Office for Recreation and Sport, the AFL and the club, and several undisclosed club benefactors.

The first completed component of the upgrades was The Precinct at Alberton, a multi-purpose events and administration centre attached to the Robert Quinn grandstand, which was completed in June 2022. The precinct includes the club museum, store, membership services, private event spaces and a large bar, restaurant and kitchen with views over Alberton Oval and toward the Adelaide Hills. Dedicated facilities for the women's team were completed prior to the August 2022 season. The women's football program is located within and along the length of the Fos Williams Stand, and includes expansive locker-rooms, player recovery and administration offices, a team meeting room and a lounge. The redevelopment of the Allan Scott HQ building and addition of the adjacent High Performance Centre and outdoor training/soccer field, located on the eastern side of the oval, commenced in October 2022. Four 39-metre LED light towers were installed in June 2023, allowing night matches to be broadcast on television. The redevelopment was completed in February 2024 and was unveiled to club supporters at a family day.

In June 2024, the club unveiled designs for proposed further development of the oval, which included a third heritage grandstand to increase the overall seated capacity to 6,000 and overall capacity to 10,000, and a rehabilitation centre and STEM learning and education facility, all located on the current site of the Port Adelaide Bowls Club green. The bowls club would be upgraded and the synthetic green shifted to an east-west orientation. The club announced it had secured $17 million of state government funding for part of the project in January 2025, which would add more than 1,000 terraced seats along the eastern boundary and move the AFLW program to an expanded High Performance Centre building. This expansion featued AFLW changerooms, hot and cold recovery baths, additional administration spaces, drinks stations and a new player run-out. Construction of these upgrades commenced in October 2025 and were opened in July 2026. The club has said it would "continue working with the State Government and partners on the next phase of development" concerning the bowls club and the proposed third main grandstand.

== Ground records ==
=== Highest score ===
- 33.24 (222) – Port Adelaide def. South Adelaide (1988).

=== Largest margin ===
- 160 – Port Adelaide def. West Adelaide (1903).

=== Most goals in a match ===
- 16 – Tim Evans, Port Adelaide (1980)

=== Longest winning streak ===
- 31 – Port Adelaide (1909, Round 9 → 1915, Round 7)

== Cricket ==
Alberton Oval was used as a cricket ground during summer between 1877 and 1996. Following the opening game between Tasmania and the Queen and Albert Cricket Association in 1877, the ground became the home of the new Port Adelaide Cricket Club in 1897 and remained so until the end of 1996.

In the early years attention needed to be paid to the state of the outfield. An example of this need was when Port Adelaide batsman G.S.P. Jones was able to run 8 while making 143 not out against West Torrens in 1904-05 because the fieldsman could not find the ball amongst the weeds. Cricket and football shared the use of the oval for a century, until the Port Adelaide Football Club was elevated into the AFL in 1997 and required the full-year use of the ground.

The cricket club now plays games at the Port Reserve in Port Adelaide.

== Grandstands ==
The grounds main stands and features are:

=== Fos Williams Family Stand ===
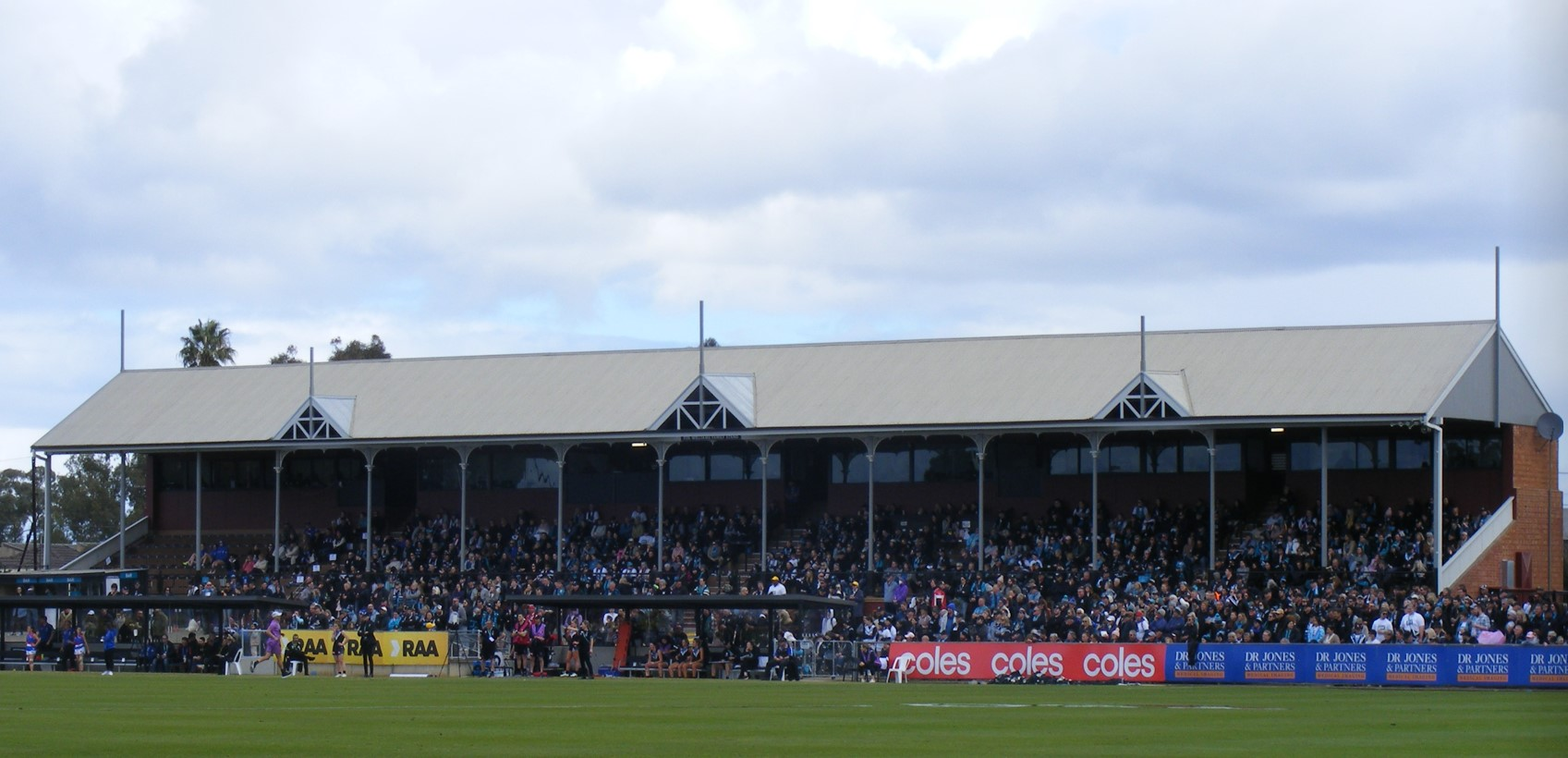
The Williams Family Grandstand at Alberton Oval.

Opened in 1903. The oldest remaining structure at Alberton Oval, the Fos Williams stand houses the SANFL change rooms, coaching and media boxes. It also is the location of plaques commemorating members of the Williams family.

=== Robert B. Quinn MM Grandstand ===
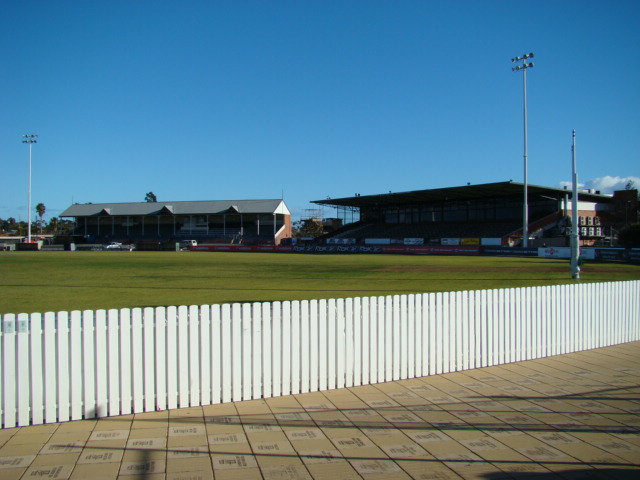
The Williams and Quinn grandstands pictured in 2007.

Opened in 1964, the grandstand houses the Port Club bistro, Bob McLean sportsbar, Port Store and upstairs function room.

=== Allan Scott Power Headquarters ===
Built with donations provided by businessman Allan Scott, government grants and funding provided by the sale of personalised pavers laid around the Oval precinct, the Headquarters house the administration of the Port Adelaide Football Club along with the AFL training facilities. The Headquarters also have a balcony that overlooks the ground. In 2010 the HQ was upgraded, the cornerstone of which was the Mark Williams Facility, which allows players to train indoors during extreme weather conditions.

=== N.L. Williams Scoreboard ===
Named after Port Adelaide and South Australian cricketer Norman Williams, the scoreboard is located on the South East pocket.

== Attendance records ==
=== Football ===
The attendance record at the ground for an Australian rules football match was 22,738 during a match against Norwood on 11 June 1977.

№	Crowd	Date	Participants	Event	Series
1	22,738	11 June 1977	Port Adelaide def. Norwood	Australian rules football	1977 SANFL Season
2	?	14 March 1981	Port Adelaide def by. Richmond	Australian rules football	1981 Pre Season

=== Concert ===
№	Crowd	Date	Participants	Event	Series
1	?	31 December 1996	Jimmy Barnes	Concert	NYE Live at the Port
