= Brenton Adcock =

Australian rules footballer

Personal information
- Full name: Brenton C. Adcock
- Born: 27 June 1943 (age 83)

Playing career^{1}
Years	Club	Games (Goals)
1962–1974	Sturt	259 (6)

Representative team honours
Years	Team	Games (Goals)
	South Australia	20
- ^{1} Playing statistics correct to the end of 1974.

Career highlights
- Sturt premiership player 1966, 1967, 1968 1969, 1970, 1974; All-Australian team 1966; Sturt Team of the Century (back pocket); South Australian Football Hall of Fame inductee 2002

Brenton C. Adcock is a former Australian rules footballer who represented Sturt in the South Australian National Football League (SANFL) during the 1960s and 1970s.

Nuggety and rugged, Adcock earned a reputation as a dashing and reliable defender who was a key member of Sturt's five consecutive premiership wins from 1966 to 1970. His last SANFL game for Sturt was their 1974 Grand Final win to finish his career with six premierships.

At interstate level Adcock was a regular representative for South Australia, with some of his 20 state games taking place at the 1966, 1969 and 1972 carnivals. He was selected into the All-Australian team in the 1966 Hobart Carnival.

Adcock's contribution to football in South Australia was recognised when he was among the first players inducted into the South Australian Football Hall of Fame in 2002. He was named in the back pocket in Sturt's official 'Team of the Century'.
