= Paul Bagshaw =

Australian rules footballer

Personal information
- Full name: Paul Lynton Bagshaw
- Nickname: Mr Magic
- Born: 22 August 1946 (age 80)

Playing career^{1}
Years	Club	Games (Goals)
1964–1980	Sturt	360 (258)

Representative team honours
Years	Team	Games (Goals)
	South Australia	14
- ^{1} Playing statistics correct to the end of 1980.

Career highlights
- 7x Sturt premiership player (1966, 1967, 1968, 1969, 1970, 1974, 1976); 5x Sturt best and fairest (1966, 1969, 1970, 1971, 1977); Sturt leading goalkicker (1978); Sturt captain (1973–1980); South Australian Football Hall of Fame Inductee (2002); Sturt Team of the Century (ruck rover); Australian Football Hall of Fame Inductee (2016)

Paul Lynton Bagshaw MBE (born 22 August 1946) is a former Australian rules footballer who represented Sturt in the South Australian National Football League (SANFL) during the 1960s and 1970s. Bagshaw played 360 games for the Double Blues and 14 for South Australia. He also kicked 258 goals for Sturt and captained the club from 1973 to 1980. He played in seven winning grand finals.

Throughout his playing career, Bagshaw played mostly as ruck-rover, but also was an effective key position player. He was one of the last players to use the drop kick frequently, and displayed outstanding handball and marking skills. His ability to achieve the seemingly impossible in tight situations gave rise to the nickname "Mr. Magic". In 1979 Bagshaw was made a Member of the Order of the British Empire for his services to football. He was inducted into the SANFL Hall of Fame in 2002, and into the Australian Football Hall of Fame in 2016.

Bagshaw's father was 1940 Sturt premiership ruckman Hartley Bagshaw, while his younger brothers Bill and John and son Guy also played for Sturt.

== Bibliography ==
- Lysikatos, John (1995). Cornwall, Peter (ed.). True Blue: The History of the Sturt Football Club. Unley: Sturt Football Club. ISBN 0-9592687-1-5.
