= Tony Burgan =

Australian rules footballer

Personal information
- Full name: Anthony Burgan
- Born: 28 March 1950 (age 76)
- Position: Utility

Playing career^{1}
| Years | Club | Games (Goals) |
| 1967–1979 | Sturt | 244 (122) |

Representative team honours
| Years | Team | Games (Goals) |
| | South Australia | 8 (?) |
- ^{1} Playing statistics correct to the end of 1979.

Career highlights
- 5× SANFL Premiership player: (1968, 1969, 1970, 1974, 1976); All-Australian team: (1972); Sturt Hall of Fame, inducted 2006

Anthony Burgan (born 28 March 1950) is a former Australian rules footballer who played for the Sturt Football Club in the South Australian National Football League (SANFL).

When Burgan started his career at Sturt in 1967, the club were the reigning premiers and he had trouble establishing a place in the side. He missed out on their premiership that year but played in Sturt's 1968, 1969 and 1970 flags. A versatile player, Burgan was used across half back, the centre, as an on baller and at half forward over the course of his time in the SANFL. He finished with five premierships, having participated in their winning 1974 and 1976 Grand Finals.

Burgan represented the South Australian interstate team on eight occasions and was an All-Australian at the 1972 Perth Carnival. He is a wingman in Sturt's official 'Team of the Century'.
