= Scrutton =

Scrutton is a surname. Notable people with the surname include:

- Clarrie Scrutton (1899–1982), Australian rules footballer, brother of Gordon
- Daphne Anderson (née Scrutton; 1922–2013), English stage, film, and television actress, dancer and singer
- Gordon Scrutton (1902–1966), Australian rules footballer, brother of Clarrie
- Mary Beatrice Midgley (née Scrutton; 1919–2018), British philosopher
- Michael Scrutton, English cricketer
- Nigel Shaun Scrutton (born 1964), British biochemist
- Sir Thomas Edward Scrutton (1856–1934), English legal text-writer and judge
