= Bill Mayman =

Australian rules footballer

Personal information
- Full name: William Mayman
- Born: 1 May 1887; Footscray, Victoria
- Died: 20 April 1970 (aged 82); Westbourne Park, South Australia
- Original team: Mines Rovers
- Position: Centre

Playing career^{1}
Years	Club	Games (Goals)
1906-1911	Mines Rovers (Goldfields FL)	
1912	Boulder City (Goldfields FL)	
1913–1915, 1919–1921	Sturt (SANFL)	79 (11)
1922–1924	New Town (TAS)	26 (15)
1925	Burnie (TAS)	15 (11)

Coaching career
Years	Club	Games (W–L–D)
1914-1915, 1919	Sturt	
1923-1924	New Town	
1925	Burnie	
- ^{1} Playing statistics correct to the end of 1926.

Career highlights
- 3 games for Western Australia; 7 games for South Australia; 10 games for Tasmania; Captain of Sturt 1914-1919; Captain of Tasmania 1923-1924; Captain of New Town 1923-1924; Captain of Burnie 1925; Sturt Premiership Captain 1915, 1919; Sturt Team of the Century; Sturt Hall of Fame Inductee 2006; South Australian Football Hall of Fame Inductee 2019

Bill Mayman (1 May 1887 – 20 April 1970) was an Australian rules footballer who played with Sturt in the South Australian Football League (SAFL).

A centreman or half-back flanker, Mayman began his career at Mines Rovers in the Goldfields Football Association. In 1913, he joined Sturt in the South Australian Football League, and became captain in 1914. He led the club to its first and second premierships in 1915 and 1919. In 1922, he moved to Tasmania and joined the New Town Football Club, playing there for three years.

Mayman represented three different states at carnival football, representing Western Australia in 1911, captaining South Australia in 1914, and represented Tasmania in 1924.

He is the great-granduncle of Australian rules footballers Bradley Crouch, who plays for the St Kilda Football Club, and his younger brother and former teammate Matt Crouch, who plays for the Adelaide Football Club in the Australian Football League (AFL).
