= Damian Squire =

Australian rules footballer (born 1973)

Personal information
- Full name: Damian Squire
- Born: 15 November 1973 (age 52); Adelaide, South Australia
- Original team: North Adelaide
- Height: 180 cm (5 ft 11 in)
- Weight: 80 kg (176 lb)

Playing career^{1}
Years	Club	Games (Goals)
1991–98	North Adelaide	113 (148)
1997	Port Adelaide (AFL)	5 (4)
1999–2006	Sturt	145 (157)
Total		263 (309)
- ^{1} Playing statistics correct to the end of 2006.

Career highlights
- SANFL debut for North Adelaide in 1991; Port Adelaide (AFL) Inaugural Team Member 1997 v Collingwood at MCG; SANFL Magarey Medallist 1999, 2000; Sturt premiership player 2002; Sturt best and fairest 1999, 2005; 7 State games for South Australia (Captain 2003 v WA at Fremantle Oval); SANFL Player life member

Damian Squire (born 15 November 1973 in Adelaide, South Australia) is a former Australian rules footballer who played with Port Adelaide in the Australian Football League (AFL) and both North Adelaide and Sturt in the South Australian National Football League (SANFL). Squire is the step-brother of former Norwood and Central District footballer Mark Jones.

Squire was a Port Adelaide Magpies supporter when he was growing up in the inner-northern Adelaide suburb of Broadview, but due to where he lived and played his junior football with the Broadview Tigers and Greenacres Dragons in the heart of North Adelaide's metropolitan zone (only 10 minutes from North's home Prospect Oval), he ended up playing for the Roosters in the SANFL.

== Career ==
A half forward, Squire played 145 games for the Roosters between 1991 and 1998 establishing himself as one of the leading players in South Australia. In 1996 he signed with Port Adelaide for their first season in the AFL and was a member the Power's inaugural AFL side in 1997 against Collingwood at the Melbourne Cricket Ground, picking up four kicks and four handballs. After playing in a further four games and kicking four goals in the Power's inaugural season he was surprisingly delisted at the end of the season and returned full-time to the SANFL with North Adelaide with whom he had still played in 1997 when not selected for Port Adelaide.

In 1999 he left North Adelaide and joined Sturt to "experience something new" and went on to win successive Magarey Medals in 1999 and 2000, cementing his place among the all-time greats of the league and becoming the first Sturt player to win the medal in successive years. Squire was also the Double Blues' best and fairest winner in 1999 and 2005, joining such Double Blues greats as Paul Bagshaw, Rick Davies and Peter Motley in winning the award more than once.

As a 17-year-old rookie he missed a place in North Adelaide's premiership team in his debut season in 1991 as the Roosters were able to recall their Adelaide Crows (AFL) players who had played enough SANFL games in 1991 to qualify for the finals. He played his first SANFL Grand Final for Sturt in their 9-point loss to Port Adelaide in 1998, and was a member of the historic 2002 Sturt side which defeated defending premiers Central District by 47 points (13.14 (92) to 6.9 (45)) at AAMI Stadium to win the club's first flag since 1976.

Six days after the win, several of the club's players and support staff, including Squire, were celebrating the win at the Sari Club in Bali when the Bali bombing incident occurred. Sturt teammate Josh Deegan and club trainer Bob Marshall were killed in the blast. Squire was sitting at the bar with Marshall when the blast occurred, and told the grim news to Marshall's son when the team arrived back in Adelaide.

Squire retired from football at the end of the 2006 SANFL season having played 258 SANFL games, 145 for North and 113 for Sturt, and kicking 290 goals. He also played 5 AFL games for Port Adelaide, kicking 4 goals. As a result of his 258 SANFL games, Squire is a member of the SANFL 200 Club.

Damian Squire was assistant coach of the struggling Division 1 A Grade side Broadview Football Club alongside Mark Kemp and former Adelaide Crows player Wayne Weidemann. Damien moved with Weidemann to coach the Walkerville Football Club for the 2017 season and was reappointed for the 2018 season.

== Representative career ==
Damian Squire represented South Australia seven times in Interstate Football and in 2003 was given the honor of captaining his state to a 17.16 (118) to 8.10 (58) win against Western Australia at the Fremantle Oval in Perth.
