= 2007 SANFL season =

- Teams: 9
- Premiers: Central District; 6th premiership
- Minor premiers: Central District; 9th minor premiership
- Magarey Medallist: Luke Crane; Sturt (22 votes)
- Ken Farmer Medallist: Brant Chambers; Sturt (106 Goals)
- Matches played: 96
- Highest: 30,478 (Grand Final, Central District vs. North Adelaide)

The 2007 South Australian National Football League season was the 128th season of the top-level Australian rules football competition in South Australia.

== Premiership season ==
=== Round 1 ===
	Round 1
Thursday 5 April (7:40 pm)	Norwood 17.8 (110)	def. by	Port Adelaide 22.7 (139)	Norwood Oval
Saturday 7 April (2:10 pm)	West Adelaide 11.8 (74)	def. by	Sturt 11.17 (83)	Richmond Oval
Saturday 7 April (2:10 pm)	South Adelaide 11.11 (77)	def. by	Woodville-West Torrens 24.19 (163)	Encounter Bay
Saturday 7 April (2:10 pm)	Central District 16.10 (106)	def.	North Adelaide 9.10 (64)	Elizabeth Oval
Bye: Glenelg

=== Round 2 ===
	Round 2
Saturday 14 April (2:10 pm)	Central District 16.14 (110)	def.	South Adelaide 7.9 (51)	Elizabeth Oval
Sunday 15 April (2:10 pm)	Woodville-West Torrens 10.10 (70)	def. by	Port Adelaide 18.14 (122)	Woodville Oval
Sunday 15 April (2:10 pm)	North Adelaide 19.16 (130)	def.	West Adelaide 8.10 (58)	Prospect Oval
Sunday 15 April (2:10 pm)	Sturt 17.8 (110)	def.	Glenelg 13.6 (84)	Unley Oval
Bye: Norwood

=== Round 3 ===
	Round 3
Saturday 21 April (2:10 pm)	Glenelg 12.20 (92)	def. by	West Adelaide 15.6 (96)	Glenelg Oval
Sunday 22 April (2:10 pm)	Port Adelaide 16.18 (114)	def. by	Sturt 20.3 (123)	Alberton Oval
Sunday 22 April (2:10 pm)	South Adelaide 18.13 (121)	def.	Norwood 13.11 (89)	Hickinbotham Oval
Bye: Central District, North Adelaide, Woodville-West Torrens

=== Round 4 ===
	Round 4
Wednesday 25 April (2:10 pm)	Woodville-West Torrens 11.3 (69)	def. by	Central District 23.13 (151)	Thebarton Oval
Saturday 28 April (2:10 pm)	Glenelg 6.4 (40)	def.	Port Adelaide 4.9 (33)	Glenelg Oval
Saturday 28 April (2:10 pm)	Sturt 4.7 (31)	def. by	Norwood 11.15 (81)	Unley Oval
Saturday 28 April (2:10 pm)	North Adelaide 10.12 (72)	drew with	South Adelaide 11.6 (72)	Prospect Oval
Bye: West Adelaide

=== Round 5 ===
	Round 5
Friday 4 May (2:10 pm)	Norwood 11.14 (80)	def. by	North Adelaide 14.11 (95)	Norwood Oval
Saturday 5 May (2:10 pm)	West Adelaide 12.10 (82)	def.	Woodville-West Torrens 10.18 (78)	Richmond Oval
Saturday 5 May (2:10 pm)	Port Adelaide 12.18 (90)	def.	South Adelaide 10.10 (70)	Alberton Oval
Saturday 5 May (2:10 pm)	Central District 15.12 (102)	def.	Glenelg 12.7 (79)	Elizabeth Oval
Bye: Sturt

=== Round 6 ===
	Round 6
Friday 11 May (7:40 pm)	Norwood 13.9 (87)	def. by	Central District 23.11 (149)	Norwood Oval
Saturday 12 May (2:10 pm)	North Adelaide 15.10 (100)	def.	Sturt 8.6 (54)	Prospect Oval
Sunday 13 May (2:10 pm)	Port Adelaide 19.14 (128)	def.	West Adelaide 18.12 (120)	Alberton Oval
Sunday 13 May (2:10 pm)	Glenelg 11.10 (76)	def. by	Woodville-West Torrens 16.9 (105)	Glenelg Oval
Bye: South Adelaide

=== Round 7 ===
	Round 7
Saturday 19 May (2:10 pm)	Woodville-West Torrens 15.10 (100)	def.	Sturt 12.4 (76)	Woodville Oval
Saturday 19 May (2:10 pm)	West Adelaide 15.10 (100)	def. by	Norwood 17.9 (111)	Richmond Oval
Saturday 19 May (2:10 pm)	Central District 12.11 (83)	def.	Port Adelaide 11.7 (73)	Elizabeth Oval
Sunday 20 May (2:10 pm)	South Adelaide 14.13 (97)	def.	Glenelg 12.11 (83)	Hickinbotham Oval
Bye: North Adelaide

=== Round 8 ===
	Round 8
Saturday 26 May (2:10 pm)	Port Adelaide 10.12 (72)	def. by	Norwood 14.18 (102)	Alberton Oval
Saturday 26 May (2:10 pm)	North Adelaide 10.8 (68)	def. by	Central District 16.7 (103)	Prospect Oval
Saturday 26 May (2:10 pm)	Sturt 17.9 (111)	def.	West Adelaide 14.11 (95)	Unley Oval
Sunday 27 May (2:10 pm)	Woodville-West Torrens 21.12 (138)	def.	South Adelaide 11.13 (79)	Woodville Oval
Bye: Glenelg

=== Round 9 ===
	Round 9
Friday 1 June (7:40 pm)	Norwood 15.10 (100)	def.	Glenelg 9.13 (67)	Norwood Oval
Saturday 2 June (2:10 pm)	West Adelaide 5.8 (38)	def. by	Central District 20.7 (127)	Berri Oval
Saturday 2 June (2:10 pm)	Port Adelaide 9.8 (62)	def. by	North Adelaide 18.28 (136)	Alberton Oval
Sunday 3 June (2:10 pm)	South Adelaide 8.12 (60)	def. by	Sturt 16.14 (110)	Hickinbotham Oval
Bye: Woodville-West Torrens

=== Round 10 ===
	Round 10
Saturday 9 June (2:10 pm)	Woodville-West Torrens 11.7 (73)	def. by	Norwood 19.11 (125)	Thebarton Oval
Saturday 9 June (2:10 pm)	West Adelaide 8.11 (59)	def. by	South Adelaide 17.16 (118)	Richmond Oval
Saturday 9 June (2:10 pm)	Sturt 17.7 (109)	def.	Central District 15.12 (102)	Unley Oval
Monday 11 June (2:10 pm)	Glenelg 20.13 (133)	def.	North Adelaide 13.7 (85)	Glenelg Oval
Bye: Port Adelaide

=== Round 11 ===
	Round 11
Saturday 16 June (2:10 pm)	Sturt 15.8 (98)	def.	Port Adelaide 10.11 (71)	Unley Oval
Sunday 17 June (2:10 pm)	North Adelaide 17.8 (110)	def.	Woodville-West Torrens 12.10 (82)	Prospect Oval
Sunday 17 June (2:10 pm)	Glenelg 26.18 (174)	def.	West Adelaide 6.6 (42)	Glenelg Oval
Sunday 17 June (2:10 pm)	South Adelaide 10.14 (74)	def. by	Central District 14.11 (95)	Hickinbotham Oval
Bye: Norwood

=== Round 12 ===
	Round 12
Friday 22 June (7:40 pm)	Norwood 5.15 (45)	def. by	Sturt 15.15 (105)	Norwood Oval
Saturday 23 June (2:10 pm)	Port Adelaide 11.14 (80)	drew with	Glenelg 12.8 (80)	Alberton Oval
Saturday 23 June (2:10 pm)	Central District 15.10 (100)	def.	Woodville-West Torrens 7.7 (49)	Elizabeth Oval
Sunday 24 June (2:10 pm)	South Adelaide 15.10 (100)	def. by	North Adelaide 21.13 (139)	Hickinbotham Oval
Bye: West Adelaide

=== Round 13 ===
	Round 13
Saturday 30 June (2:10 pm)	Central District 34.7 (211)	def.	Norwood 8.5 (53)	Elizabeth Oval
Saturday 30 June (2:10 pm)	Port Adelaide 8.9 (57)	def. by	Woodville-West Torrens 8.11 (59)	Alberton Oval
Saturday 30 June (2:10 pm)	West Adelaide 15.13 (103)	def. by	North Adelaide 19.13 (127)	Richmond Oval
Saturday 30 June (2:10 pm)	Sturt 15.14 (104)	def. by	Glenelg 22.9 (141)	Adelaide Oval
Bye: South Adelaide

=== Round 14 ===
	Round 14
Saturday 7 July (2:10 pm)	Norwood 7.10 (52)	def. by	North Adelaide 11.11 (77)	Norwood Oval
Saturday 7 July (2:10 pm)	Woodville-West Torrens 19.21 (135)	def.	West Adelaide 8.8 (56)	Thebarton Oval
Sunday 8 July (2:10 pm)	Glenelg 10.13 (73)	def. by	Central District 14.5 (89)	Glenelg Oval
Sunday 8 July (2:10 pm)	South Adelaide 14.5 (89)	def.	Port Adelaide 11.10 (76)	Hickinbotham Oval
Bye: Sturt

=== Round 15 ===
	Round 15
Saturday 14 July (2:10 pm)	Central District 23.12 (150)	def.	West Adelaide 6.6 (42)	Elizabeth Oval
Saturday 14 July (2:10 pm)	Sturt 25.15 (165)	def.	South Adelaide 8.7 (55)	Unley Oval
Sunday 15 July (2:10 pm)	North Adelaide 9.11 (65)	def. by	Port Adelaide 16.14 (110)	Prospect Oval
Sunday 15 July (2:10 pm)	Glenelg 16.16 (112)	def.	Norwood 14.15 (99)	Glenelg Oval
Bye: Woodville-West Torrens

=== Round 16 ===
	Round 16
Saturday 21 July (2:10 pm)	Norwood 18.16 (124)	def.	South Adelaide 5.9 (39)	Norwood Oval
Sunday 22 July (2:10 pm)	Woodville-West Torrens 17.12 (114)	def.	Glenelg 13.15 (93)	Woodville Oval
Sunday 22 July (2:10 pm)	Sturt 16.10 (106)	def.	North Adelaide 12.7 (79)	Unley Oval
Bye: Central District, Port Adelaide, West Adelaide

=== Round 17 ===
	Round 17
Saturday 28 July (2:10 pm)	Norwood 13.8 (86)	def. by	Woodville-West Torrens 17.16 (118)	Norwood Oval
Saturday 28 July (2:10 pm)	Port Adelaide 11.12 (78)	def. by	Central District 14.7 (91)	Alberton Oval
Saturday 28 July (2:10 pm)	West Adelaide 10.12 (72)	def. by	Sturt 14.8 (92)	Richmond Oval
Saturday 28 July (2:10 pm)	Glenelg 22.13 (145)	def.	South Adelaide 12.9 (81)	Glenelg Oval
Bye: North Adelaide

=== Round 18 ===
	Round 18
Saturday 4 August (2:10 pm)	Central District 12.13 (85)	def.	Woodville-West Torrens 11.9 (75)	Elizabeth Oval
Saturday 4 August (2:10 pm)	West Adelaide 11.7 (73)	def. by	Glenelg 13.7 (85)	Richmond Oval
Saturday 4 August (2:10 pm)	North Adelaide 18.8 (116)	def.	Norwood 8.11 (59)	Prospect Oval
Sunday 5 August (2:10 pm)	South Adelaide 11.13 (79)	def. by	Port Adelaide 25.16 (166)	Hickinbotham Oval
Bye: Sturt

=== Round 19 ===
	Round 19
Saturday 11 August (2:10 pm)	Sturt 12.11 (83)	def. by	Woodville-West Torrens 15.8 (98)	Adelaide Oval
Saturday 11 August (2:10 pm)	North Adelaide 13.12 (90)	def.	Central District 8.7 (55)	Prospect Oval
Sunday 12 August (2:10 pm)	Glenelg 20.18 (138)	def.	Port Adelaide 19.8 (122)	Glenelg Oval
Sunday 12 August (2:10 pm)	South Adelaide 10.14 (74)	def. by	West Adelaide 19.14 (128)	Hickinbotham Oval
Bye: Norwood

=== Round 20 ===
	Round 20
Saturday 18 August (2:10 pm)	Port Adelaide 11.16 (82)	def. by	Sturt 18.9 (117)	Alberton Oval
Saturday 18 August (2:10 pm)	Woodville-West Torrens 14.12 (96)	def.	North Adelaide 13.15 (93)	Woodville Oval
Saturday 18 August (2:10 pm)	Norwood 20.18 (138)	def.	West Adelaide 11.10 (76)	Norwood Oval
Sunday 19 August (2:10 pm)	Central District 17.11 (113)	def.	South Adelaide 8.10 (58)	Elizabeth Oval
Bye: Glenelg

=== Round 21 ===
	Round 21
Saturday 25 August (2:10 pm)	North Adelaide 16.6 (102)	def. by	Glenelg 20.17 (137)	Prospect Oval
Saturday 25 August (2:10 pm)	West Adelaide 5.16 (46)	def. by	Woodville-West Torrens 19.14 (128)	Richmond Oval
Saturday 25 August (2:10 pm)	Port Adelaide 20.7 (127)	def.	Norwood 17.14 (116)	Alberton Oval
Saturday 25 August (2:10 pm)	Central District 16.15 (111)	def.	Sturt 13.5 (83)	Elizabeth Oval
Bye: South Adelaide

=== Round 22 ===
	Round 22
Saturday 1 September (2:10 pm)	Norwood 8.12 (60)	def. by	Central District 16.15 (111)	Norwood Oval
Saturday 1 September (2:10 pm)	Woodville-West Torrens 25.9 (159)	def.	South Adelaide 8.8 (56)	Woodville Oval
Saturday 1 September (2:10 pm)	North Adelaide 22.15 (147)	def.	West Adelaide 6.7 (43)	Prospect Oval
Saturday 1 September (2:10 pm)	Glenelg 20.11 (131)	def.	Sturt 15.7 (97)	Glenelg Oval
Bye: Port Adelaide

=== Round 23 ===
	Round 23
Friday 7 September (7:40 pm)	Sturt 15.5 (95)	def. by	North Adelaide 15.12 (102)	Adelaide Oval
Saturday 8 September (2:10 pm)	South Adelaide 15.15 (105)	def. by	Norwood 17.15 (117)	Hickinbotham Oval
Saturday 8 September (2:10 pm)	West Adelaide 11.11 (77)	def. by	Port Adelaide 21.13 (139)	Richmond Oval
Saturday 8 September (2:10 pm)	Woodville-West Torrens 13.14 (92)	drew with	Glenelg 14.8 (92)	Woodville Oval
Bye: Central District

== Ladder ==
2007 SANFL Ladder
Pos	Team	Pld	W	L	D	PF	PA	PP	Pts
1	Central District (P)	20	18	2	0	2244	1373	62.04	36
2	North Adelaide	20	12	7	1	1997	1706	53.93	25
3	Woodville-West Torrens	20	12	7	1	2001	1745	53.42	25
4	Sturt	20	12	8	0	1952	1797	52.07	24
5	Glenelg	20	10	8	2	2055	1823	52.99	22
6	Port Adelaide	20	8	11	1	1941	1863	51.03	17
7	Norwood	20	8	12	0	1834	2044	47.29	16
8	South Adelaide	20	4	15	1	1555	2341	39.91	9
9	West Adelaide	20	3	17	0	1480	2367	38.47	6

Rules for classification: 1) points; 2) percentage; 3) number of points for.
(P) Premiers

== Finals series ==
=== Week one – Qualifying and elimination finals ===
	Elimination final
Sunday 16 September (12:15 pm)	Sturt 8.8 (56)	def. by	Glenelg 8.9 (57)	Adelaide Oval (crowd: See below)

	Qualifying final
Sunday 16 September (3:15 pm)	North Adelaide 10.9 (69)	def.	Woodville-West Torrens 8.14 (62)	Adelaide Oval (crowd: 11,746)

=== Week two – Semi-finals ===
	First Semi-final
Sunday 23 September (12:15 pm)	Woodville-West Torrens 13.9 (87)	def.	Glenelg 12.9 (81)	Adelaide Oval (crowd: See below)

	Second Semi-final
Sunday 23 September (3:15 pm)	Central District 10.16 (76)	def.	North Adelaide 7.14 (56)	Adelaide Oval (crowd: 14,764)

=== Week three – Preliminary final ===
	Preliminary final
Sunday 30 September (3:15 pm)	North Adelaide 18.14 (122)	def.	Woodville-West Torrens 15.6 (96)	Adelaide Oval (crowd: 7,794)

== Grand final ==
2007 SANFL Grand Final
Sunday 7 October (2:10 pm)	Central District	def.	North Adelaide	Football Park (crowd: 30,493)
5.2 (32); 8.4 (52); 11.6 (72); 16.11 (107)	Q1; Q2; Q3; Final	2.3 (15); 3.6 (24); 4.9 (33); 5.12 (42)
