= Tony Clarkson (footballer) =

Australian rules footballer

Personal information
- Full name: Anthony Russell Clarkson
- Nickname: Doc
- Born: 13 August 1939; Adelaide, South Australia
- Died: 25 January 2011 (aged 71); Adelaide, South Australia
- Original team: Adelaide University
- Height: 194 cm (6 ft 4 in)
- Weight: 82 kg (181 lb)
- Position: Ruck
- Other occupation: Doctor

Playing career^{1}
Years	Club	Games (Goals)
1959, 1964–1968	Sturt (SANFL)	110 (106)
- ^{1} Playing statistics correct to the end of 1968.

Career highlights
- 6 games for South Australia; 2x Sturt Best and Fairest 1965, 1967; 3x Sturt Premiership player 1966, 1967, 1968; Sturt Football Club Hall of Fame Inductee 2006

Dr Tony Clarkson AM (13 August 1939 – 25 January 2011) was an Australian rules footballer who played with Sturt in the South Australian National Football League (SANFL).

Following his football career, Clarkson became a highly regarded name in medicine as a founding director of the Renal Unit at the Royal Adelaide Hospital and president of the Medical Board of South Australia. In The Queen's Birthday 2004 Honours List, he was awarded Member of the Order of Australia "For service to renal medicine, particularly as a contributor to the advancement of the specialty of nephrology in the Asia-Pacific region through clinical research, teaching and professional organisations, and to the community."
