= 1909 SAFL season =

1909 season of SANFL

1909 SAFL premiership season
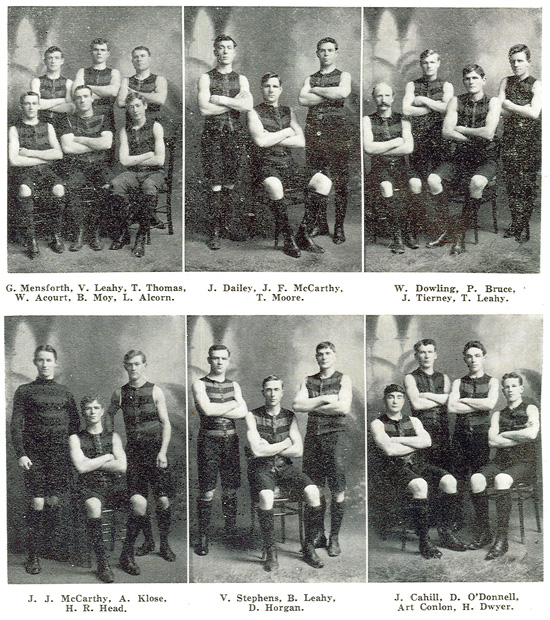
- 33rd season Pictured above is the 1909 West Adelaide premiership team.
- Teams: 7
- Premiers: West Adelaide; 2nd premiership
- Minor premiers: Port Adelaide; 7th minor premiership
- Magarey Medallist: Richard Head; West Adelaide
- Leading goalkicker: Richard Townsend; Norwood (22 goals)
- Matches played: 46
- Highest: 25,000 (Grand Final, West Adelaide vs. Port Adelaide)

The 1909 South Australian Football League season was the 33rd season of the top-level Australian rules football competition in South Australia.

The season saw West Adelaide maintain its rapid rise from the previous season by winning its second consecutive premiership; however, they were defeated in the Championship of Australia by South Melbourne. West Adelaide overcame a bad injury run in the middle of the season before returning to form in the finals.

Sturt, who had not won a game the previous season under Oscar Hyman, embarked on a major recruiting spree led by influential Municipal Tramways Trust member and club supporter John Dempsey, who used his patronage to induce players to the club via employment in the area, ultimately finishing fifth. At the other end of the ladder, South Adelaide, who had been the strongest team in the league during the 1890s, finished winless, and became the third different club to suffer a winless season in four seasons.

== Minor round ==
=== Round 1 ===
	Round 1
Saturday, 1 May 1909	West Adelaide 9.12 (66)	def.	Port Adelaide 5.5 (35)	Adelaide Oval
Saturday, 1 May 1909	Norwood 8.12 (60)	def.	West Torrens 7.8 (50)	Norwood Oval
Saturday, 1 May 1909	Sturt 12.15 (87)	def.	South Adelaide 5.5 (35)	Unley Oval
	Bye; North Adelaide

=== Round 2 ===
	Round 2
Saturday, 8 May 1909	South Adelaide 5.5 (35)	def. by	West Adelaide 9.12 (66)	Adelaide Oval
Saturday, 8 May 1909	West Torrens 6.13 (49)	def.	Port Adelaide 5.12 (42)	Hindmarsh Oval
Saturday, 8 May 1909	Norwood 3.5 (23)	def. by	North Adelaide 8.15 (63)	Norwood Oval
	Bye; Sturt

=== Round 3 ===
	Round 3
Saturday, 15 May 1909	South Adelaide 2.0 (12)	def. by	North Adelaide 2.15 (27)	Adelaide Oval
Saturday, 15 May 1909	Port Adelaide 1.4 (10)	def.	Norwood 0.5 (5)	Alberton Oval (crowd: 4,500)
Saturday, 15 May 1909	West Adelaide 8.18 (66)	def.	Sturt 2.6 (18)	Jubilee Oval
	Bye; West Torrens
The Port Adelaide vs Norwood match's aggregate score of 1.9 (15) set and, as of 2026, remains the league's lowest since the current system of scoring was introduced in 1898. and indeed in any major Australian rules league.; As of 2026, no score lower than Norwood's 0.5 (5) has been kicked in the SAFL/SANFL since.; In similar conditions at Adelaide Oval, South Adelaide kicked what, as of 2026, remains the last SAFL/SANFL score with zero behinds; and it was the last occasion a side failed to score in the first half of a match.

=== Round 4 ===
	Round 4
Saturday, 22 May 1909	North Adelaide 3.7 (25)	def. by	Port Adelaide 5.14 (44)	Adelaide Oval
Saturday, 22 May 1909	West Torrens 5.18 (48)	def. by	West Adelaide 10.13 (73)	Hindmarsh Oval (crowd: 8,000)
Saturday, 22 May 1909	Norwood 6.7 (43)	def. by	Sturt 9.12 (66)	Norwood Oval
	Bye; South Adelaide

=== Round 5 ===
	Round 5
Saturday, 29 May 1909	North Adelaide 5.10 (40)	def.	West Adelaide 4.11 (35)	Adelaide Oval
Saturday, 29 May 1909	Port Adelaide 9.8 (62)	def.	South Adelaide 6.6 (42)	Alberton Oval
Saturday, 29 May 1909	Sturt 9.18 (72)	def.	West Torrens 5.7 (37)	Unley Oval (crowd: 6,000)
	Bye; Norwood

=== Round 6 ===
	Round 6
Saturday, 5 June 1909	North Adelaide 6.5 (41)	def.	Sturt 4.14 (38)	Adelaide Oval
Saturday, 5 June 1909	West Torrens 10.19 (79)	def.	South Adelaide 6.10 (46)	Hindmarsh Oval (crowd: 4,000)
Monday, 7 June 1909	West Adelaide 6.11 (47)	def.	Norwood 5.9 (39)	Adelaide Oval
	Bye; Port Adelaide

=== Round 7 ===
	Round 7
Saturday, 12 June 1909	North Adelaide 2.11 (23)	def. by	West Torrens 10.8 (68)	Adelaide Oval
Saturday, 12 June 1909	Norwood 10.16 (76)	def.	South Adelaide 4.10 (34)	Norwood Oval
Saturday, 12 June 1909	Sturt 3.13 (31)	def. by	Port Adelaide 5.8 (38)	Unley Oval
	Bye; West Adelaide

=== Round 8 ===
	Round 8
Saturday, 26 June 1909	South Adelaide 6.5 (41)	def. by	Sturt 16.18 (114)	Adelaide Oval
Saturday, 26 June 1909	Port Adelaide 6.5 (41)	def. by	West Adelaide 7.8 (50)	Alberton Oval
Saturday, 26 June 1909	West Torrens 5.6 (36)	def. by	Norwood 7.13 (55)	Hindmarsh Oval
	Bye; North Adelaide

=== Round 9 ===
	Round 9
Saturday, 3 July 1909	North Adelaide 5.7 (37)	def. by	Norwood 9.9 (63)	Adelaide Oval
Saturday, 3 July 1909	Port Adelaide 9.14 (68)	def.	West Torrens 5.5 (35)	Alberton Oval
Saturday, 3 July 1909	West Adelaide 15.16 (106)	def.	South Adelaide 8.11 (59)	Jubilee Oval
	Bye; Sturt

=== Round 10 ===
	Round 10
Saturday, 17 July 1909	Port Adelaide 8.16 (64)	def.	North Adelaide 8.4 (52)	Alberton Oval
Saturday, 17 July 1909	West Adelaide 4.14 (38)	def. by	West Torrens 8.11 (59)	Jubilee Oval
Saturday, 17 July 1909	Sturt 5.9 (39)	def. by	Norwood 7.12 (54)	Unley Oval
	Bye; South Adelaide

=== Round 11 ===
	Round 11
Saturday, 24 July 1909	Port Adelaide 9.7 (61)	def.	Norwood 3.6 (24)	Adelaide Oval
Saturday, 24 July 1909	North Adelaide 11.10 (76)	def.	South Adelaide 5.12 (42)	Jubilee Oval
Saturday, 24 July 1909	Sturt 6.9 (45)	def.	West Adelaide 3.5 (23)	Unley Oval
	Bye; West Torrens

=== Round 12 ===
	Round 12
Saturday, 31 July 1909	South Adelaide 7.8 (50)	def. by	Port Adelaide 11.12 (78)	Adelaide Oval
Saturday, 31 July 1909	West Torrens 7.14 (56)	def.	Sturt 6.18 (54)	Hindmarsh Oval (crowd: 5,000)
Saturday, 31 July 1909	West Adelaide 14.10 (94)	def.	North Adelaide 8.9 (57)	Jubilee Oval
	Bye; Norwood

=== Round 13 ===
	Round 13
Saturday, 14 August 1909	South Adelaide 3.9 (27)	def. by	West Torrens 10.8 (68)	Adelaide Oval
Saturday, 14 August 1909	Norwood 11.6 (72)	def.	West Adelaide 5.10 (40)	Norwood Oval
Saturday, 14 August 1909	Sturt 10.12 (72)	def.	North Adelaide 5.4 (34)	Unley Oval
	Bye; Port Adelaide

=== Round 14 ===
	Round 14
Saturday, 21 August 1909	South Adelaide 3.5 (23)	def. by	Norwood 11.12 (78)	Adelaide Oval
Saturday, 21 August 1909	Port Adelaide 11.10 (76)	def.	Sturt 4.9 (33)	Alberton Oval (crowd: 13,000)
Saturday, 21 August 1909	West Torrens 11.10 (76)	def.	North Adelaide 5.5 (35)	Hindmarsh Oval
	Bye; West Adelaide
Needing a win to stay in the final four, Sturt kept close to Port Adelaide in front of an unprecedentedly large crowd, before Port Adelaide kicked away to a large lead after half-time.

== Ladder ==
1909 SAFL Ladder
Pos	Team	Pld	W	L	D	PF	PA	PP	Pts
1	Port Adelaide	12	9	3	0	619	462	57.26	18
2	West Adelaide (P)	12	8	4	0	704	548	56.23	16
3	Norwood	12	7	5	0	586	506	53.66	14
4	West Torrens	12	7	5	0	661	593	52.71	14
5	Sturt	12	6	6	0	669	544	55.15	12
6	North Adelaide	12	5	7	0	510	625	44.93	10
7	South Adelaide	12	0	12	0	446	917	32.72	0

Rules for classification: 1) points; 2) percentage; 3) number of points for.
(P) Premiers

== Major round ==
=== First semi-final ===
1909 SAFL first semi-final
Wednesday, 1 September 1909	West Adelaide	def.	West Torrens	Adelaide Oval (crowd: 16,000)
1.5 (11); 3.9 (27); 5.16 (46); 7.18 (60)	Q1; Q2; Q3; Final	0.0 (0); 1.1 (7); 3.1 (19); 3.7 (25)	Umpires: P. Kneebone
Alcorn 4, J.F. McCarthy, Head, Bruce	Goals	Moy 2, Waye
Head, Klose, Conlin, Tierney, Horgan, Alcorn, Acort, Dwyer, T. Leahy	Best	Taylor, McKenzie, Smith, Kersley, O'Leary, Miller, McDonnell, Waye, Battye

=== Second semi-final ===
1909 SAFL second semi-final
Saturday, 4 September 1909	Port Adelaide	def. by	Norwood	Adelaide Oval (crowd: 22,000)
0.3 (3); 1.5 (11); 2.7 (19); 3.10 (28)	Q1; Q2; Q3; Final	1.3 (9); 4.4 (28); 6.7 (43); 11.12 (78)	Umpires: P. Kneebone
Donaghy, Anderson, Hosking	Goals	Townsend 4, Chamberlain 2, Perry, Buist, Gwynne, L. Hill, Bahr
Manson, Dickson, Dempster, Donaghy, Congear, Hosking	Best	Townsend, McGavisk, Hutton, Nahr, Bennett, Barnes, Buist, Cope, Gwynne

=== Final ===
1909 SAFL final
Saturday, 11 September 1909	West Adelaide	def.	Norwood	Adelaide Oval (crowd: 20,000)
1.7 (13); 4.11 (35); 6.14 (50); 8.18 (66)	Q1; Q2; Q3; Final	1.1 (7); 1.3 (9); 3.5 (23); 5.8 (38)	Umpires: P. Kneebone
J.F. McCarthy 2, P. Bruce 2, Alcorn, Moore, Conlin, J.J. McCarthy	Goals	Townsend 2, Buist 2, W. Miller
T. Leahy, Tierney, Head, Conlin, J.J. McCarthy, Klose, Dowling, J.J. McCarthy	Best	H. Miller, McGavisk, L.R. Hill, Buist, Gwynne, Bahr

=== Challenge final ===
1909 SAFL challenge final
Saturday, 18 September 1909	Port Adelaide	def. by	West Adelaide	Adelaide Oval (crowd: 25,000)
3.1 (19); 4.1 (25); 6.1 (37; 6.5 (41)	Q1; Q2; Q3; Final	1.3 (9); 3.8 (26); 6.15 (51); 7.17 (59)	Umpires: P. Kneebone
Congear 2, Davies Pope, Hosking, Donaghy	Goals	Dowling 4, Alcorn 2, J.F. McCarthy
Congear, Dickson, Hosking, Mack, Dempster, Cocks, McEwen	Best	Head, T. Leahy, Dowling, Conlin, J.J. McCarthy, Klose, O'Donnell

== Championship of Australia ==
Saturday, 9 October 1909	South Melbourne	def.	West Adelaide	MCG
2.2 (14); 5.3 (33); 7.4 (46); 11.8 (74)	Q1; Q2; Q3; Final	1.2 (8); 3.9 (27); 6.9 (45); 6.14 (50)	Umpires: Bain
Thomas, Power, Mortimer, Gough, Deas, Jones, Hiskins, Kerr, Belcher	Best	J. J. McCarthy, Head, Conlin, B. Leahy, Stephens, Moore
