= Laurie King (footballer) =

Australian rules footballer, born 1908

Personal information
- Full name: Laurence Eastern King
- Nickname: Curly
- Born: 27 July 1908; Adelaide
- Died: 29 August 1992 (aged 84)
- Height: 170 cm (5 ft 7 in)
- Weight: 72 kg (159 lb)
- Position: Wing

Playing career^{1}
Years	Club	Games (Goals)
1928, 1930–1938	Sturt	127 (21)

Representative team honours
Years	Team	Games (Goals)
	South Australia	4
- ^{1} Playing statistics correct to the end of 1938.

Career highlights
- Sturt premiership 1932; 3x Sturt Best and Fairest 1934, 1936, 1938; Sturt Captain 1935-1937

Laurie King (27 July 1908 – 29 August 1992) was an Australian rules footballer who played with Sturt in the South Australian National Football League (SANFL).
