= Treleaven =

Treleaven is a surname. Notable people with the surname include:

- Dick Treleaven (born 1934), Canadian politician
- Freeman Ferrier Treleaven (1884–1952), Canadian lawyer and politician
- Ross Treleaven (1907–1994), Australian rules footballer
- Scott Treleaven, Canadian artist and filmmaker
