= 2002 SANFL season =

- Teams: 9
- Premiers: Sturt; 13th premiership
- Minor premiers: Central District; 5th minor premiership
- Magarey Medallist: Tim Weatherald; Sturt (16 votes); Jade Sheedy; Sturt (16 votes)
- Ken Farmer Medallist: Daniel Hargraves; North Adelaide (68 Goals)

Attendance
- Matches played: 96
- Total attendance: 352,059 (3,667 per match)
- Highest: 35,187 (Grand Final, Sturt vs. Central District)

The 2002 South Australian National Football League season was the 123rd season of the top-level Australian rules football competition in South Australia.

== Ladder ==
2002 SANFL Ladder
Pos	Team	Pld	W	L	D	PF	PA	PP	Pts
1	Central District	20	18	2	0	2360	1313	64.25	36
2	Norwood	20	17	3	0	2159	1544	58.30	34
3	Sturt (P)	20	16	4	0	1996	1402	58.74	32
4	Woodville-West Torrens	20	10	10	0	1666	1473	53.07	20
5	West Adelaide	20	10	10	0	1887	1913	49.66	20
6	Port Adelaide	20	6	14	0	1488	1739	46.11	12
7	North Adelaide	20	6	14	0	1637	2279	41.80	12
8	South Adelaide	20	4	16	0	1451	2159	40.19	8
9	Glenelg	20	3	17	0	1381	2203	38.53	6

Rules for classification: 1) points; 2) percentage; 3) number of points for.
(P) Premiers

== Grand final ==
2002 SANFL Grand Final
Sunday 6 October (2:10 pm)	Central District	def. by	Sturt	Football Park (crowd: 35,187)
0.1 (1); 2.4 (16); 5.6 (36); 6.9 (45)	Q1; Q2; Q3; Final	4.6 (30); 8.7 (55); 11.12 (78); 13.14 (92)
