= Victor Bateman =

Australian rules footballer

Vic Bateman

Personal information
- Full name: Victor Arnold Bateman
- Nickname: Vic
- Born: 4 August 1904; Parkside, South Australia
- Died: 29 April 1972 (aged 67); Adelaide, South Australia
- Original team: Unley Methodist
- Height: 181 cm (5 ft 11 in)
- Weight: 82 kg (181 lb)
- Position: Centre

Playing career^{1}
Years	Club	Games (Goals)
1928–1933	Sturt	86 (16)
- ^{1} Playing statistics correct to the end of 1933.

Career highlights
- Sturt premiership 1932 (Captain); Captain of Sturt 1930–1934; 2x Sturt Best and Fairest 1929, 1930; 2 games for South Australia

Victor Bateman (4 August 1904 – 29 April 1972) was an Australian rules footballer who played for Sturt in the South Australian National Football League (SANFL).
