= Ralph Green (footballer) =

Australian rules footballer and coach

Personal information
- Full name: Ralph Frederick Green
- Born: 8 June 1911; Adelaide, South Australia
- Died: 9 March 1977 (aged 65)
- Original team: Colonel Light Gardens
- Height: 183 cm (6 ft 0 in)
- Weight: 84 kg (185 lb)
- Position: Fullback

Playing career^{1}
Years	Club	Games (Goals)
1930–31, 1933, 1935–45	Sturt	157 (44)
1932	Carlton	5 (2)
1934	West Perth	20 (17)

Coaching career
Years	Club	Games (W–L–D)
1941, 1945, 1947–48	Sturt	72 (41–31–0)
- ^{1} Playing statistics correct to the end of 1948.

Ralph Frederick Green (8 June 1911 – 9 March 1977) was an Australian rules footballer who played with Sturt in the South Australian National Football League (SANFL). He also had stints at Carlton in the Victorian Football League (VFL) and West Perth in the Western Australian National Football League.

Green, who played as a forward in his early years with Sturt, was lured to Carlton in 1932 and as a result missed out on playing in Sturt's premiership team that season. His time at Carlton was plagued by injuries and he was only able to play five games. In 1933 he returned to Sturt and in the same year represented South Australia at the Sydney Carnival.

The league went into recess for three seasons due to the war and Green served briefly with the Royal Australian Air Force in 1943. He resumed his SANFL career in 1945, as Sturt's playing coach. The following year he did not play or coach at Sturt, with Bo Morton taking up the position of senior coach. In 1947, Green returned to the club after Morton resigned. No longer a player, Morton coached Sturt for two more seasons and guided them to finals in each of those years.
