= 2017 SANFL Grand Final =

| Port Adelaide | Sturt |
|---|---|
| 7.7 (49) | 7.8 (50) |
| | 1 | 2 | 3 | 4 |
|---|---|---|---|---|
| PTA | 0.2(2) | 3.4 (22) | 3.7 (25) | 7.7 (49) |
| STU | 4.1 (25) | 5.4 (34) | 6.6 (42) | 7.8 (50) |
- Date: 24 September 2017, 2.40 pm
- Stadium: Adelaide Oval
- Attendance: 39,813
- Umpires: Tobias Medlin, Giles Lewis, Corey Bowen

Broadcast in Australia
- Network: Seven Network

The 2017 South Australian National Football League (SANFL) grand final was played at the Adelaide Oval on Sunday, 24 September to determine the premiers for the 2017 SANFL season.

The Grand Final was contested by Port Adelaide and Sturt and was the first time the two teams played each other in the SANFL Grand Final since 1998.

Sturt defeated Port Adelaide by just 1 point, to record their second consecutive premiership and 15th overall.

It was the best possible finish to the season for Sturt, which became the first SANFL club to win the Under-18, Reserves and first grade premierships in the same season.

== Scorecard ==
2017 SANFL Grand Final
Sunday 24 September (2:40 pm) | Port Adelaide | def. by | Sturt | Adelaide Oval (crowd: 39,813)
2.3 (15); 3.4 (22); 3.7 (25); 7.7 (49) | Q1; Q2; Q3; Final | 4.1 (25); 5.4 (34); 6.6 (42); 7.8 (50) | Umpires: Corey Bowen, Toby Medlin, Giles Lewis; Jack Oatey Medal: Fraser Evans; Television broadcast: Seven Network
Neade 2, T. Gray 2, Ah Chee 2, Lobbe 1 | Goals | Beard 2, M. Evans, Hone, Harms, Sutcliffe, Riley 1
Ah Chee, Toumpas, Neade, Snelling, Summerton, Atley, Bonner | Best | F. Evans, Stephens, Kirkwood, Riley, Battersby, McMahon, Sumner,
The attendance of 39,813 was the highest crowd for an SANFL Grand Final since 1998, which was played by the same teams.
