= Clayton Thompson =

Australian rules footballer

Personal information
- Full name: Clayton Crieve Thompson
- Nickname: Candles
- Born: 11 December 1929
- Died: 28 June 2010 (aged 80)
- Height: 198 cm (6 ft 6 in)
- Weight: 89 kg (196 lb)
- Position: Ruckman / Forward

Playing career^{1}
Years	Club	Games (Goals)
1948–53, 1957–61	Sturt	151 (236)
1954–56	Hawthorn	50 (54)
- ^{1} Playing statistics correct to the end of 1961.

Clayton Crieve 'Candles' Thompson (11 December 1929 – 28 June 2010) was an Australian rules footballer who played for Hawthorn in the VFL during the 1950s and had a noted career with Sturt.

Thompson was one of the giants of his era, standing at 198 cm and could play both forward or as a ruckman. He started out at Sturt in 1948 and played with the South Australian club before being recruited to Hawthorn for the 1954 season. Thompson spent three seasons with Hawthorn where he was used mostly as a forward and kicked 24 goals in both of his first two seasons. After his stint was over he returned to Sturt where, as a ruckman, he finished second in the 1959 Magarey Medal to his teammate Len Fitzgerald. He was Sturt's best and fairest winner twice and topped their goalkicking on three occasions.

An All-Australian and top goalkicker at the 1953 Adelaide Carnival, Thompson played a total of 11 interstate games with South Australia for 25 goals.

In 2005 Thompson was inducted into the South Australian Football Hall of Fame.
