= Chris Thredgold =

Australian rules footballer

Personal information
- Full name: Christopher Thredgold
- Born: 8 May 1971 (age 55)
- Original team: Prince Alfred College
- Position: Full back

Playing career^{1}
Years	Club	Games (Goals)
1990	North Adelaide	2 (1)
1991–2002	Sturt	223 (11)
Total		225 (12)
- ^{1} Playing statistics correct to the end of 2002.

Chris Thredgold (born 8 May 1971) is a former Australian rules footballer who played for Sturt in the South Australian National Football League (SANFL) from 1991 to 2002. He captained the Double Blues from 1995 to 2002, which makes him the co-holder of the record for most years as captain at Sturt, shared with Paul Bagshaw. A reliable full-back, Thredgold was often described as "the heart and soul of the Double Blues". As club captain at the time, Thredgold was controversially omitted from the successful 2002 Grand Final team.

In 2014, Thredgold was elected as a board member of the Sturt Football Club in the portfolio of Football Director.
