= Norman Barron =

Australian rules footballer

Personal information
- Full name: Norman Leslie Barron
- Nickname: Barbour
- Born: 15 May 1899; Parkside, South Australia
- Died: 25 September 1987 (aged 88); Adelaide, South Australia
- Original team: Parkside Baptist
- Height: 165 cm (5 ft 5 in)
- Position: Rover

Playing career^{1}
Years	Club	Games (Goals)
1919, 1921–1928, 1930–1931	Sturt	133 (146)
- ^{1} Playing statistics correct to the end of 1931.

Career highlights
- Sturt premiership 1926; Sturt Best and Fairest 1924; Sturt Team of the Century (forward pocket)

Norman Barron (15 May 1899 – 25 September 1987) was an Australian rules footballer who played with Sturt in the South Australian National Football League (SANFL).

== Football ==
Barron missed the 1929 season when he was appointed playing coach of Victorian club Warracknabeal in the Wimmera Football League.

He returned to Sturt when he was not reappointed following Warracknabeal's failure to make the finals in his only season as coach.

== See also ==
- 1927 Melbourne Carnival
