= 2016 SANFL Grand Final =

Woodville-West Torrens	Sturt
7.7 (49)	12.4 (76)
	1	2	3	4
WWT	1.4 (10)	3.5 (23)	5.6 (36)	7.7 (49)
STU	1.1 (7)	4.2 (26)	8.2 (50)	12.4 (76)
- Date: Sunday, 25 September
- Stadium: Adelaide Oval
- Attendance: 30,213
- Umpires: Haussen, Crosby, Hundertmark

Broadcast in Australia
- Network: Seven Network

The 2016 South Australian National Football League (SANFL) grand final was played at the Adelaide Oval on Sunday, 25 September to determine the 2016 SANFL champion team.

The Grand Final was contested by the 2016 minor premiers Woodville-West Torrens and Sturt. This was the first time the two teams have played each other in the SANFL Grand Final. Sturt defeated the premiership favorites Woodville-West Torrens by 27 points as an upset to claim their fourteenth premiership overall and the first time since 2002.

== Scorecard ==
2016 SANFL Grand Final
Sunday 25 September (2:40 pm)	Woodville-West Torrens	def. by	Sturt	Adelaide Oval (crowd: 30,213)
1.4; 3.5; 5.6; 7.7 (49)	Q1; Q2; Q3; Final	1.1; 4.2; 8.2; 12.4 (76)	Television broadcast: Seven Network
