= Bert Renfrey =

Australian rules footballer

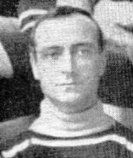

Personal information
- Full name: Ethelbert Luxmore Renfrey
- Born: 5 May 1879; Adelaide, South Australia
- Died: 29 April 1940 (aged 60); Adelaide, South Australia
- Height: 185 cm (6 ft 1 in)
- Weight: 86 kg (190 lb)

Playing career^{1}
Years	Club	Games (Goals)
1895–1898	North Adelaide	
1899–1900	Norwood	
1901–03; 1908	West Broken Hill	
1904	Boulder City	
1905–1906	West Perth	41 (7)
1907	St Kilda	15 (0)
1909–1913	Sturt	56 (16)
- ^{1} Playing statistics correct to the end of 1907.

Ethelbert Luxmore "Bert" Renfrey (5 May 1879 – 29 April 1940) was an Australian rules footballer who played in the South Australian Football Association, Victorian Football League and West Australian Football Association.

== Family ==
The son of Senior Constable William Renfrey (1849-1916), and Mary Jane Renfrey (1852-1920), née Percy, Ethelbert Luxmore Renfrey was born in South Australia on 5 May 1879. He married Ethel Maud Percy (1886-1968) on 23 September 1921. They had two children: Mary Lois (later Mrs. Colin Gilbert Sinclair), and Ronald.

== Footballer ==
=== North Adelaide (1895–1898) ===
Aged just 16, Renfrey made his SAFA debut for North Adelaide in 1895.

=== Norwood (1899–1900) ===
Renfrey joined Norwood for two seasons in 1899. During this time he represented South Australia at inter-colonial football.

=== West Broken Hill (1901–1903) ===
Renfrey, a two time Stawell Gift runner-up, then played with West Broken Hill and was a member of their 1901 and 1903 Broken Hill Football League premiership winning teams.

=== Boulder City (1904) ===
In 1904 Renfrey played a season for the Goldfields Football Association club Boulder City.

=== West Perth (1905–1906) ===
Renfrey joined West Perth and participated in their 1905 premiership side. The following year, West Perth made another grand final, but Renfrey missed the game through injury.

=== St Kilda (1907) ===
In 1907 he competed in his fourth state, playing 15 games for St Kilda. His last game was St Kilda's historic semi final against Carlton, their first ever final.

=== Return to West Broken Hill (1908) ===
He returned to West Broken Hill in 1908 and represented New South Wales in the Jubilee Australasian Football Carnival, held in Melbourne that year. The founder of the Sturt Football Club, Arthur Thomas, met Renfrey at the carnival and convinced him to sign with them for the 1909 season.

=== Sturt (1909–1913) ===
Having captained Sturt in his first season, Renfrey was made captain-coach in 1910 and remained in that position for the rest of his time at the club.

Renfrey represented South Australia in a total of 11 interstate matches and captained the 1911 Adelaide Carnival team. The South Australians finished the carnival unbeaten, defeating the VFL representative side by 43 points.

In the 1913 finals series, Sturt were upset by West Adelaide and following the game several players accused Renfrey of "playing dead". With five members of the team refusing to play with him again, Renfrey was sacked by the committee. He was reinstated the next evening after a vote of confidence was carried and took part in their next game, a loss to his former club North Adelaide. Following the match he was involved in a fight with prominent Sturt player Albert Heinrichs and never played for the club again.

Despite the bitter end to his time with Sturt, he was later named on the interchange bench in their official "Team of the Century".

== Coaching ==
Renfrey joined South Adelaide as non playing coach in 1914 and the following year guided them to third position on the ladder. The league went into recess during World War I and when it returned in 1919, Renfrey coached for one final season.

== Military service ==
Bert Renfrey enlisted for service in the First AIF during the First World War on 4 January 1916, but was discharged (at his own request) on 31 August 1916.

== After football ==
Renfrey became a bookmaker after his football career ended.

== Death ==
Renfrey died from a self inflicted gunshot wound in the South Parklands of Adelaide on 29 April 1940.

== See also ==
- 1908 Melbourne Carnival
