= 1968 SANFL season =

- Teams: 10
- Premiers: Sturt; 8th premiership
- Minor premiers: Sturt; 6th minor premiership
- Magarey Medallist: Barrie Robran; North Adelaide
- Ken Farmer Medallist: Rick Vidovich; Central District (90 Goals)

Attendance
- Matches played: 104
- Total attendance: 1,028,780 (9,892 per match)
- Highest: 57,811 (Grand Final, Sturt vs. Port Adelaide)

The 1968 South Australian National Football League season was the 89th season of the top-level Australian rules football competition in South Australia.

== Ladder ==
1968 SANFL Ladder
Pos	Team	Pld	W	L	D	PF	PA	PP	Pts
1	Sturt (P)	20	18	2	0	2072	1401	59.66	36
2	Port Adelaide	20	15	5	0	1411	1013	58.21	30
3	North Adelaide	20	14	6	0	1574	1375	53.37	28
4	West Adelaide	20	12	8	0	1484	1371	51.98	24
5	Glenelg	20	11	9	0	1464	1396	51.19	22
6	South Adelaide	20	9	10	1	1538	1621	48.69	19
7	West Torrens	20	9	11	0	1436	1374	51.10	18
8	Central District	20	4	16	0	1410	1846	43.30	8
9	Woodville	20	4	16	0	1202	1824	39.72	8
10	Norwood	20	3	16	1	1515	1885	44.56	7

Rules for classification: 1) points; 2) percentage; 3) number of points for.
(P) Premiers

== Finals Series ==
=== Grand Final ===
1968 SANFL Grand Final
Saturday, 28 September (2:10 pm)	Sturt	def.	Port Adelaide	Adelaide Oval (crowd: 57,811)
3.3 (21); 5.11 (41); 10.13 (73); 12.18 (90)	Q1; Q2; Q3; Final	3.4 (22); 4.4 (28); 6.6 (42); 9.9 (63)
