= Parker Morton =

Australian rules footballer, coach, and administrator

Bo Morton
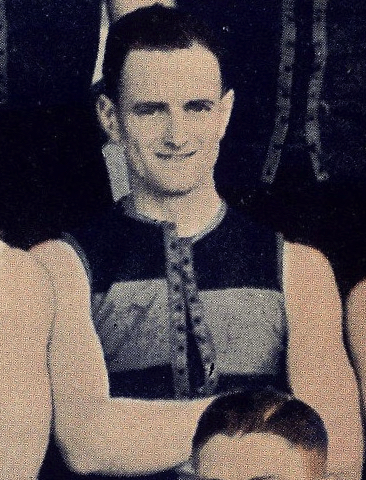

Personal information
- Full name: Parker Thomas Morton
- Nickname: Bo
- Born: 2 November 1911; Adelaide, South Australia
- Died: 3 September 1995 (aged 83); Port Lincoln, South Australia
- Original team: St Augustine's
- Height: 6 ft 1 in (185 cm)
- Weight: 11 st 11 lb (75 kg)
- Position: Full forward

Playing career^{1}
Years	Club	Games (Goals)
1930–1940	Sturt	138 (561)

Representative team honours
Years	Team	Games (Goals)
	South Australia	6

Coaching career
Years	Club	Games (W–L–D)
1940, 1946	Sturt (SANFL)	37 (25–12–0)
- ^{1} Playing statistics correct to the end of 1940.

Career highlights
- Captain-coach Sturt 1940 premiership; 3x Sturt best and fairest 1937, 1939, 1940; 6x Sturt leading goalkicker 1930, 1931, 1937, 1938, 1939, 1940; South Australian Football Hall of Fame (2004 inductee); Sturt Football Club Hall of Fame (inaugural inductee)

Parker Thomas "Bo" Morton OAM (2 November 1911 – 3 September 1995) was an Australian rules footballer, coach and administrator for the Sturt Football Club in the South Australian National Football League (SANFL).

In 1981 the Sturt Football Club honoured Morton by naming the award for the club's best and fairest player the P. T. Morton Medal.

On 26 January 1983, Morton was awarded the Medal of the Order of Australia for services to sport in the fields of Australian rules football and golf.

== Player ==
Morton made his league debut on 26 April 1930 and impressed immediately with his positional play as a half-forward. Morton finished his debut season as Sturt's leading goalkicker and eighth overall in the league with 37 goals. He followed up in 1931 to again lead Sturt's goalkicking with 77 goals (third in the league). Morton particularly impressed in a game against Glenelg where he kicked eight goals, including three goals in three minutes to win the game, the first coming from a loudly applauded play where when running at full pace he intercepted the flight of the ball, gathered it up in the crook of his arm, and proceeded to kick the goal.

Controversy was created in 1933 when Morton sought a clearance to transfer to South Adelaide. The clearance was refused and Morton continued as an important player for Sturt.

Following a number of injury interrupted seasons, Morton was a standout for Sturt in 1937 and was awarded the best and fairest and also led the goal kicking with 53 goals. In 1938, Morton was presented with life membership of the Sturt Football Club and was appointed captain. Later that season, he was also appointed as the state captain for the team that played against the Broken Hill Football League in August. He once again led Sturt's goal kicking with 56 goals.

In 1939, Morton once again led Sturt's goal kicking (84 goals), was captain and won the best and fairest for the second time. It was noted, however, that Sturt had become "too much Morton" and he was overworked, allowing defenders to focus on him rather than his teammates. In August, Morton broke a finger playing for the State Bank against the Savings Bank in a mid-week corporate match.

At the start of 1940, West Adelaide offered Morton the position of coach. In response, the existing Sturt coach, Walter Scott withdrew from the position to allow Morton to be appointed in order to retain him at Sturt. Morton proceeded to lead Sturt as captain-coach to the premiership, winning his third best and fairest and becoming the club's first century goal kicker with 101 goals for the season.

During the 1940 season, Morton joined the Royal Australian Air Force to assist with the war effort. Following the 1940 premiership, Morton retired having played 138 games and kicking 561 goals.

== Coach ==
In 1946, following the end of the Second World War, Morton was appointed non-playing coach of Sturt. He was reappointed for the 1947 season, but resigned prior to the start of the season due to business reasons.

=== Coaching statistics ===
Season	Team	Games coached	Wins	Losses	Draws	Ladder position	League teams
1940	Sturt	19	15	4	0	1	8
1946	Sturt	18	10	8	0	4	8
Career totals		37	25	12	0		

== Administrator ==
Morton was elected to the Sturt Football Club board at their 1948 annual general meeting (AGM) and became Treasurer. He was re-elected for a further term at the 1953 AGM, and became Chairman, a role he held for six years until 1958.

Morton was appointed President of the Sturt Football Club in 1975 and held the position for seven years. Upon his retirement from the position in 1981, the club named its best and fairest award the P. T. Morton Medal in recognition of his contribution for more than half a century to the club.

In 1990, Morton was appointed Patron of the Sturt Football Club, a position he held until 1995.

== Media ==
Morton was a writer for the South Australian Football Budget from 1948 to 1950 and was also a panelist for Channel 9's World of Sport.

== Other sports ==
Morton played cricket for the Sturt Cricket Club. He was elevated to captain in 1946 to become only the second person (after Vic Richardson) to captain Sturt at both football and cricket.

A keen golfer, Morton gave 23 years service to the Glenelg Golf Club as a committeeman, and was appointed club captain from 1965 to 1966, following a stint as vice-captain from 1962 to 1964.
