= 1976 SANFL season =

- Teams: 10
- Premiers: Sturt; 12th premiership
- Minor premiers: Port Adelaide; 35th minor premiership
- Magarey Medallist: Russell Ebert; Port Adelaide (42 votes)
- Ken Farmer Medallist: Fred Phillis; Glenelg (98 Goals)

Attendance
- Matches played: 111
- Total attendance: 997,056 (8,982 per match)
- Highest: 66,897 (Grand Final, Sturt vs. Port Adelaide)

The 1976 South Australian National Football League season was the 97th season of the top-level Australian rules football competition in South Australia.

== Ladder ==
1976 SANFL Ladder
Pos	Team	Pld	W	L	D	PF	PA	PP	Pts
1	Port Adelaide	21	17	4	0	2568	1902	57.45	34
2	Sturt (P)	21	14	6	1	2491	1843	57.48	29
3	Glenelg	21	14	7	0	2800	2116	56.96	28
4	West Adelaide	21	12	9	0	2171	1925	53.00	24
5	Norwood	21	11	10	0	2299	2164	51.51	22
6	Central District	21	11	10	0	2153	2409	47.19	22
7	South Adelaide	21	9	11	1	2217	2326	48.80	19
8	North Adelaide	21	8	13	0	2014	2521	44.41	16
9	Woodville	21	6	15	0	2021	2546	44.25	12
10	West Torrens	21	2	19	0	1994	2976	40.12	4

Rules for classification: 1) points; 2) percentage; 3) number of points for.
(P) Premiers

== Finals Series ==
Elimination Final

Saturday, September 11 - Football Park

Norwood 17-19 121 def West Adelaide 14-14 98

Qualifying Final

Sunday, September 5 - Football Park

Glenelg 20-16. 36 def. Sturt. 16-17. 113

First Semi-Final

Saturday, September 11 - Football Park

Sturt. 17-23. 125 def Norwood. 16-3. 99

Second Semi-Final

Sunday, September 12 - Football Park

Port Adelaide 17-21 123 def. Glenelg 11-14. 80

Preliminary Final

Saturday, September 18 - Football Park

Sturt. 18-13. 121 def. Glenelg. 16-18. 114

=== Grand Final ===
1976 SANFL Grand Final
Saturday, 25 September (2:10 pm)	Port Adelaide	def. by	Sturt	Football Park (crowd: 66,897)
2.5 (17); 3.8 (26); 7.13 (55); 10.15 (75)	Q1; Q2; Q3; Final	1.3 (9); 7.6 (48); 11.8 (74); 17.14 (116)

Port Adelaide were strong grand final favourites, but Sturt scored an upset win in the 1976 SANFL Grand Final, in front of a record crowd.
