= Ross Treleaven =

Australian rules footballer, born 1907

Personal information
- Full name: Ross Treleaven
- Born: 1907
- Died: 4 March 1994 (aged 86–87)
- Original team: Manthorpe Memorial
- Height: 168 cm (5 ft 6 in)
- Weight: 65 kg (143 lb)
- Position: Wing

Playing career^{1}
Years	Club	Games (Goals)
1929–1939	Sturt	171 (3)

Representative team honours
Years	Team	Games (Goals)
	South Australia	3
- ^{1} Playing statistics correct to the end of 1939.

Career highlights
- Sturt premiership 1932; 3x Sturt Best and Fairest 1931, 1932, 1938; Best Player SA v WA State Game 1938

Ross Treleaven (1907 – 4 March 1994) was an Australian rules footballer who played with Sturt in the South Australian National Football League (SANFL).
