= 1924 SAFL Grand Final =

| West Torrens | Sturt |
|---|---|
| 9.12 (66) | 8.10 (58) |
| | 1 | 2 | 3 | 4 |
|---|---|---|---|---|
| WT | 3.3 (21) | 5.7·(37) | 7.11 (53) | 9.12 (66) |
| STU | 1.1 (7) | 5.3 (33) | 7.5 (47) | 8.10 (58) |
- Date: Saturday, 27 September
- Stadium: Adelaide Oval
- Attendance: 44,345

The 1924 SAFL Grand Final was an Australian rules football game contested between the West Torrens Football Club and the Sturt Football Club, held at the Adelaide Oval in Adelaide on the 27 September 1924.

It was the 26th annual Grand Final of the South Australian Football League, staged to determine the premiers for the 1924 SAFL season. The match, attended by 44,345 spectators, was won by West Torrens by a margin of 8 points, marking the club's first ever premiership victory.
