= Jody Arnol =

Australian rules football player (born 1968)

Personal information
- Full name: Jody Arnol
- Born: 25 September 1968 (age 58)
- Original team: North Hobart (TFL)
- Height: 192 cm (6 ft 4 in)
- Weight: 89 kg (196 lb)

Playing career^{1}
Years	Club	Games (Goals)
1990–1991	St Kilda	13 (6)
- ^{1} Playing statistics correct to the end of 1991.

Jody Arnol (born 25 September 1968) is a former Australian rules football player who played for St Kilda in the Australian Football League during the 1990 and 1991 AFL seasons.

Arnol was the third selection in the 1989 VFL Draft.

Following his delistment by St Kilda, Arnol moved to Adelaide to play for Sturt in the South Australian National Football League (SANFL).
