= Horrie Riley =

Australian rules footballer, born 1902

Personal information
- Full name: Horace Alexander Riley
- Born: 10 September 1902; Melbourne, Victoria, Australia
- Died: 8 February 1970 (aged 67); Kangaroo Island, South Australia
- Original team: St Augustine's

Playing career^{1}
Years	Club	Games (Goals)
1922–1930	Sturt	122 (121)

Representative team honours
Years	Team	Games (Goals)
	South Australia	20
- ^{1} Playing statistics correct to the end of 1930.

Career highlights
- Magarey Medalist: 1923; South Australian Football Hall of Fame inductee

Horrie Riley (10 September 1902 – 8 February 1970) was an Australian rules footballer who played with Sturt in the SAFL.

== Football ==
Despite being one of the smaller players in the league, Victorian born Horrie Riley was particularly strong in the air.

He won the 1923 Magarey Medal, was a member of Sturt's premiership side in 1926 and represented South Australia 20 times at interstate football.

When he retired he 1930 he had played a total of 122 games.

Riley has a place in the back pocket in Sturt's official 'Team of the Century'.

== See also ==
- 1927 Melbourne Carnival
