= 1974 SANFL season =

- Teams: 10
- Premiers: Sturt; 11th premiership
- Minor premiers: Sturt; 7th minor premiership
- Magarey Medallist: Russell Ebert; Port Adelaide (28 votes)
- Ken Farmer Medallist: Ken Whelan; Sturt (108 Goals)
- Matches played: 116
- Highest: 58,113 (Grand Final, Sturt vs. Glenelg)

The 1974 South Australian National Football League season was the 95th season of the top-level Australian rules football competition in South Australia.

== Ladder ==
1974 SANFL Ladder
Pos	Team	Pld	W	L	D	PF	PA	PP	Pts
1	Sturt (P)	22	19	3	0	2691	1642	62.10	38
2	Port Adelaide	22	18	3	1	2650	2146	55.25	37
3	Norwood	22	16	6	0	2640	2001	56.88	32
4	Glenelg	22	11	11	0	2681	2297	53.86	22
5	West Torrens	22	11	11	0	2302	2319	49.82	22
6	Central District	22	10	12	0	2280	2337	49.38	20
7	North Adelaide	22	7	15	0	2039	2455	45.37	14
8	South Adelaide	22	7	15	0	2218	2790	44.29	14
9	Woodville	22	6	15	1	1957	2651	42.47	13
10	West Adelaide	22	4	18	0	1754	2574	40.53	8

Rules for classification: 1) points; 2) percentage; 3) number of points for.
(P) Premiers

== Finals Series ==
=== Grand Final ===
1974 SANFL Grand Final
Saturday, 28 September (2:10 pm)	Sturt	def.	Glenelg	Football Park (crowd: 58,113)
6.5 (41); 6.6 (42); 6.12 (48); 9.16 (70)	Q1; Q2; Q3; Final	0.1 (1); 4.6 (30); 6.7 (43); 8.7 (55)

== Events ==
- On 4 May (Round 5), Football Park hosts its first SANFL game – Central Districts 21.13 (139) defeat North Adelaide 16.13 (109)
