= Gordon Scrutton =

Australian rules footballer, born 1902

Personal information
- Full name: Gordon Scrutton
- Born: 31 December 1902; Unley, South Australia
- Died: 6 June 1966 (aged 63); Adelaide, South Australia
- Original team: Sturt Royals
- Height: 177 cm (5 ft 10 in)
- Weight: 72 kg (159 lb)
- Position: Forward

Playing career^{1}
| Years | Club | Games (Goals) |
| 1922–1929 | Sturt | 87 (201) |
- ^{1} Playing statistics correct to the end of 1929.

Career highlights
- Sturt premiership 1926; 4x Sturt Leading Goalkicker 1924 (40), 1926 (34), 1927 (35), 1928 (28)

Gordon Scrutton (31 December 1902 – 6 June 1966) was an Australian rules footballer who played with Sturt in the South Australian National Football League (SANFL).

On 5 May 1923, Gordon, alongside his siblings Clarrie and Stan, became part of the first trio of brothers to play for Sturt at the same time.
