= John Paynter (footballer) =

Australian rules footballer

Personal information
- Full name: John Paynter
- Born: 15 May 1960 (age 66)
- Original team: Brighton High School
- Height: 177 cm (5 ft 10 in)
- Weight: 76 kg (168 lb)
- Position: Ruck rover

Playing career^{1}
Years	Club	Games (Goals)
1980–1982	Glenelg	70 (82)
1983–1992	Sturt	248 (249)
Total		318 (331)

Representative team honours
Years	Team	Games (Goals)
	South Australia	6 (?)
- ^{1} Playing statistics correct to the end of 1992.

Career highlights
- Sturt best and fairest 1983, 1986, 1989, 1991; South Australian Football Hall of Fame (2015 inductee)

John C. Paynter (born 15 May 1960) is a former Australian rules footballer who played for Sturt and Glenelg in the South Australian National Football League (SANFL) from 1980 to 1992.

After initially starting his career at Glenelg, Paynter shifted to Sturt in 1983 where he would win the best and fairest in his first season and would win three more over the course of 248 games for that club. He was club captain for his final two seasons (1991–1992). In 2015, Paynter was inducted into the South Australian Football Hall of Fame.

Paynter currently coaches the Modbury Football Club in Division 1 of the Channel 9 Adelaide Football League.
