= 1940 SANFL Grand Final =

Sturt	South Adelaide
14.16 (100)	11.13 (79)
	1	2	3	4
STU	4.5 (29)	5.6 (36)	11.10 (76)	14.16 (100)
STH	0.0 (0)	4.6 (30)	6.9 (45)	11.13 (79)
- Date: Saturday, 28 September
- Stadium: Adelaide Oval
- Attendance: 28,500

The 1940 SANFL Grand Final was an Australian rules football competition. Sturt beat South Adelaide 100 to 79.
