= 1919 SAFL season =

40th season of the top-level Australian rules football competition in South Australia

1919 SAFL premiership season
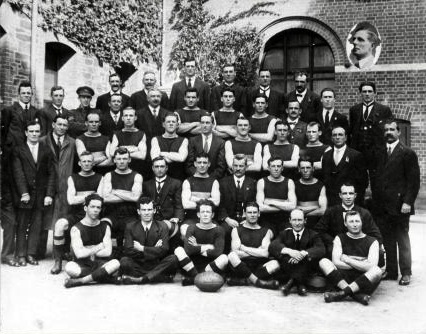
- 39th SAFL season Pictured above is the 1919 Sturt premiership team.
- Teams: 7
- Premiers: Sturt; 2nd premiership
- Minor premiers: Sturt; 2nd minor premiership
- Magarey Medallist: Dan Moriarty; South Adelaide
- Leading goalkicker: Len Lackman; Port Adelaide (26 goals)
- Matches played: 48
- Highest: 35,000 (Grand Final Replay, Sturt vs. North Adelaide)

The 1919 South Australian Football League season was the 40th season of the top-level Australian rules football competition in South Australia, and the first recognised competition since 1915 due to suspension of the competition during World War I.

After having contested seven consecutive grand finals prior to the war, Port Adelaide fell to fourth as the team lost key players during the war, including star follower Oliver who departed for business in the Riverland. 1915 finalists West Adelaide, having lost most of its key pre-war players until late in the season, and South Adelaide, who had suffered similarly from key players remaining in the forces, both missed the finals.

Defending premiers Sturt were predicted to be and were stronger than in 1915, ultimately winning its second consecutive premiership in a grand final replay, after losing and then drawing with North Adelaide in the semi-final and grand final.

== Minor round ==
=== Round 1 ===
	Round 1
Saturday, 3 May 1919	South Adelaide 3.8 (26)	def. by	North Adelaide 6.15 (51)	Adelaide Oval
Saturday, 3 May 1919	Port Adelaide 16.15 (111)	def.	West Adelaide 7.8 (50)	Alberton Oval
Saturday, 3 May 1919	Sturt 10.9 (69)	def.	West Torrens 7.13 (55)	Unley Oval
	Bye; Norwood

=== Round 2 ===
	Round 2
Saturday, 10 May 1919	North Adelaide 5.8 (38)	def.	Port Adelaide 5.4 (34)	Adelaide Oval
Monday, 12 May 1919	West Adelaide 5.9 (39)	def. by	Norwood 8.4 (52)	Adelaide Oval
Monday, 12 May 1919	Sturt 11.12 (78)	def.	South Adelaide 9.15 (69)	Unley Oval
	Bye; West Torrens

=== Round 3 ===
	Round 3
Saturday, 17 May 1919	South Adelaide 6.10 (46)	drew with	Port Adelaide 6.10 (46)	Adelaide Oval
Saturday, 17 May 1919	West Torrens 4.14 (38)	def. by	North Adelaide 7.6 (48)	Hindmarsh Oval
Saturday, 17 May 1919	Norwood 2.3 (15)	def. by	Sturt 12.10 (82)	Norwood Oval
	Bye; West Adelaide

=== Round 4 ===
	Round 4
Saturday, 24 May 1919	South Adelaide 8.10 (58)	def.	West Adelaide 6.6 (42)	Adelaide Oval
Saturday, 24 May 1919	Port Adelaide 3.16 (34)	def. by	West Torrens 7.10 (52)	Alberton Oval
Saturday, 24 May 1919	Norwood 7.5 (47)	def. by	North Adelaide 8.11 (59)	Norwood Oval
	Bye; Sturt
Port Adelaide suffered its first defeat at Alberton Oval since round 8, 1909, after 34 wins and one draw at the ground.

=== Round 5 ===
	Round 5
Saturday, 31 May 1919	North Adelaide 3.8 (26)	def. by	Sturt 5.15 (45)	Adelaide Oval
Saturday, 31 May 1919	West Torrens 8.27 (75)	def.	West Adelaide 5.4 (34)	Hindmarsh Oval
Saturday, 31 May 1919	Norwood 6.5 (41)	def. by	South Adelaide 7.9 (51)	Norwood Oval
	Bye; Port Adelaide

=== Round 6 ===
	Round 6
Saturday, 3 June 1919	Sturt 8.5 (53)	def.	Port Adelaide 6.13 (49)	Adelaide Oval
Saturday, 7 June 1919	North Adelaide 13.17 (95)	def.	West Adelaide 3.3 (21)	Adelaide Oval
Saturday, 7 June 1919	West Torrens 12.9 (81)	def.	Norwood 10.10 (70)	Hindmarsh Oval
	Bye; South Adelaide

=== Round 7 ===
	Round 7
Saturday, 14 June 1919	South Adelaide 3.8 (26)	def. by	West Torrens 9.11 (65)	Adelaide Oval
Saturday, 14 June 1919	Norwood 5.8 (38)	def. by	Port Adelaide 15.18 (108)	Norwood Oval
Saturday, 14 June 1919	Sturt 16.14 (110)	def.	West Adelaide 5.2 (32)	Unley Oval
	Bye; North Adelaide

=== Round 8 ===
	Round 8
Saturday, 21 June 1919	West Adelaide 5.11 (41)	def. by	Port Adelaide 7.17 (59)	Adelaide Oval
Monday, 23 June 1919	South Adelaide 4.9 (33)	def. by	North Adelaide 5.9 (39)	Adelaide Oval
Monday, 23 June 1919	West Torrens 9.10 (64)	def.	Sturt 8.13 (61)	Hindmarsh Oval
	Bye; Norwood

=== Round 9 ===
	Round 9
Saturday, 28 June 1919	South Adelaide 7.7 (49)	def. by	Sturt 9.10 (64)	Adelaide Oval
Saturday, 28 June 1919	Port Adelaide 5.7 (37)	def.	North Adelaide 4.3 (27)	Alberton Oval
Saturday, 28 June 1919	Norwood 10.9 (69)	def. by	West Adelaide 9.17 (71)	Norwood Oval
	Bye; West Torrens

=== Round 10 ===
	Round 10
Saturday, 12 July 1919	North Adelaide 4.8 (32)	def. by	West Torrens 5.5 (35)	Adelaide Oval
Saturday, 12 July 1919	Port Adelaide 6.8 (44)	def.	South Adelaide 5.4 (34)	Alberton Oval
Saturday, 12 July 1919	Sturt 8.7 (55)	def.	Norwood 5.11 (41)	Unley Oval
	Bye; West Adelaide

=== Round 11 ===
	Round 11
Saturday, 19 July 1919	Port Adelaide 5.13 (43)	def. by	Sturt 7.6 (48)	Alberton Oval
Saturday, 19 July 1919	Norwood 6.9 (45)	def. by	West Torrens 8.14 (62)	Norwood Oval
	Bye; North Adelaide, South Adelaide, West Adelaide

=== Round 12 ===
	Round 12
Saturday, 26 July 1919	North Adelaide 11.13 (79)	def.	Norwood 3.5 (23)	Adelaide Oval
Saturday, 26 July 1919	West Torrens 9.18 (72)	def.	Port Adelaide 7.12 (54)	Hindmarsh Oval
Saturday, 26 July 1919	West Adelaide 10.14 (74)	def. by	South Adelaide 13.5 (83)	Jubilee Oval
	Bye; Sturt

=== Round 13 ===
	Round 13
Saturday, 9 August 1919	West Adelaide 7.9 (51)	def.	West Torrens 4.14 (38)	Adelaide Oval
Saturday, 9 August 1919	Sturt 8.12 (60)	def.	North Adelaide 7.10 (52)	Unley Oval
	Bye; Norwood, Port Adelaide, South Adelaide

=== Round 14 ===
	Round 14
Saturday, 16 August 1919	West Adelaide 10.8 (68)	def.	Sturt 6.10 (46)	Adelaide Oval
Saturday, 16 August 1919	Port Adelaide 10.14 (74)	def.	Norwood 6.9 (45)	Alberton Oval
Saturday, 16 August 1919	West Torrens 6.19 (55)	def.	South Adelaide 6.9 (45)	Hindmarsh Oval
	Bye; North Adelaide

=== Round 15 ===
	Round 15
Saturday, 23 August 1919	South Adelaide 13.13 (91)	def.	Norwood 9.9 (63)	Adelaide Oval
Saturday, 23 August 1919	West Adelaide 10.12 (72)	def.	North Adelaide 10.10 (70)	Jubilee Oval
	Bye; Port Adelaide, Sturt, West Torrens
Norwood suffered its eleventh consecutive loss, a record long streak for the club since equalled only once, in 1969.

== Ladder ==
1919 SAFL Ladder
Pos	Team	Pld	W	L	D	PF	PA	PP	Pts
1	Sturt (P)	12	10	2	0	771	563	57.80	20
2	West Torrens	12	9	3	0	692	569	54.88	18
3	North Adelaide	12	7	5	0	610	471	56.43	14
4	Port Adelaide	12	6	5	1	693	544	56.02	13
5	South Adelaide	12	4	7	1	605	671	47.41	9
6	West Adelaide	12	4	8	0	595	854	41.06	8
7	Norwood	12	1	11	0	558	852	39.57	2

Rules for classification: 1) points; 2) percentage; 3) number of points for.
(P) Premiers

== Major Round ==
=== First Semi-Final ===
1919 SAFL First Semi-final
Saturday, 30 August 1919	Sturt	def. by	North Adelaide	Adelaide Oval (crowd: 16,000)
0.1 (1); 1.2 (8); 2.4 (16); 3.5 (23)	Q1; Q2; Q3; Final	2.8 (20); 3.14 (32); 6.15 (51); 7.18 (60)	Umpires: O'Connor
Smith, Robinson, Richardson	Goals	Dayman 2, Lewis 2, T. Leahy, Guy, O'Brien
Richardson, Colouhoun, Whitehead, Kappler, Ryan, Mayman, Nicolle	Best	Dayman, T. Leahy, Curnow, Lewis, O'Brien, Davy, Fooks, Hamilton, Haines
Scrutton (shoulder)	Injuries

=== Second Semi-final ===
1919 SAFL Second Semi-final
Saturday, 6 September 1919	West Torrens	def.	Port Adelaide	Adelaide Oval (crowd: 16,000 est.)
3.2 (20); 3.3 (21); 5.4 (34); 9.5 (59)	Q1; Q2; Q3; Final	1.2 (8); 2.2 (14); 3.2 (20); 5.5 (35)	Umpires: O'Connor
Manning 3, C. Cornow 2, Marvel 2, Patten 2	Goals	Lackman 2, Dunn, Olds, Congear
Campbell, Patten, C. Curnow, Walker, Manning, Stone, G. Curnow, Karney	Best	Adams, Olds, Lincoln, Robertson, Drew, Taylor, Tubel, Bampton

=== Final ===
1919 SAFL Final
Saturday, 13 September 1919	West Torrens	drew with	North Adelaide	Adelaide Oval
1.1 (7); 1.3 (9); 2.3 (15); 2.3 (15)	Q1; Q2; Q3; Final	1.0 (6); 1.0 (6); 2.2 (14); 2.3 (15)	Umpires: Johnstone
Marvel, Manning	Goals	Fullarton, Foale
Johnson, Wade, Karney, Curnow, Hollis, Patten, Campbell, Marsh, Allen	Best	Hamilton, Curnow, Dayman, Leahy, Fuss, Foale, Fooks, Frost
Heavy rain resulting in deep pools of water on the field as well as a strong cross-wind to the eastern wing contributed to a combined score of only 4.6 (30), which was and remains as of 2026 the lowest-scoring SAFL/SANFL match since 1909.

==== Replay ====
1919 SAFL Final Replay
Saturday, 20 September 1919	West Torrens	def. by	North Adelaide	Adelaide Oval
2.0 (12); 5.2 (32); 5.3 (33); 5.3 (33)	Q1; Q2; Q3; Final	1.0 (6); 5.0 (30); 5.1 (31); 6.2 (38)	Umpires: Johnstone
Patten 2, Marvel, Manning, Karney	Goals	T. Leahy 2, Davy, Dayman, V. Leahy, O'Brien
Johnson, Curnow, Campbell, Stone, Manning, Wade, Allen, Marsh	Best	T. Leahy, Davy, Dayman, Fullarton, Fuss, Lewis, Williams, Hamilton

=== Grand Final ===
1919 SAFL Grand Final
Saturday, 27 September 1919	Sturt	drew with	North Adelaide	Adelaide Oval
0.1 (1); 4.4 (28); 4.6 (30); 5.9 (39)	Q1; Q2; Q3; Final	4.3 (27); 5.3 (33); 5.4 (34); 5.9 (39)	Umpires: Johnstone
Beatty 2, Robinson, Golding, Smith	Goals	Dayman 2, T. Leahy, Foale, Lewis
Odgers, Mayman, Richardson, Kappler, Shary, Beatty, Bruce, Golding	Best	T. Leahy, Hamilton, Dayman, Foale, Crawford, Davey, Fuss, Frost

==== Replay ====
1919 SAFL Grand Final Replay
Wednesday, 8 October	Sturt	def.	North Adelaide	Adelaide Oval (crowd: 35,000)
0.2 (2); 0.3 (3); 0.4 (4); 3.5 (23)	Q1; Q2; Q3; Final	0.3 (3); 1.4 (10); 2.6 (18); 2.6 (18)	Umpires: Keough
H. P. Nicolle 2, Sellick	Goals	Frost, Fuss
Mayman, Scrutton, Colouhoun, H. P. Nicolle, Venus, Kippler, Ryan, Smith, Sharp	Best	Dayman, Hamilton, Lewis, O'Brien, Curnow, Trenery
Sturt's H. P. Nicolle kicked the winning goal from a place kick in the final minute of the match.; Extremely windy conditions confined almost all play to the eastern wing throughout the match.
