= Len Toyne =

Australian rules footballer and coach

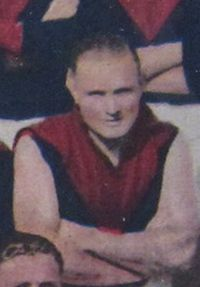

Personal information
- Full name: Leonard Harris Toyne
- Born: 12 July 1922; Terang, Victoria
- Died: 17 March 1998 (aged 75); Launceston, Tasmania
- Original team: Terang (HFL)
- Height: 175 cm (5 ft 9 in)
- Weight: 77 kg (170 lb)

Playing career^{1}
Years	Club	Games (Goals)
1940–41, 1945	Geelong	35 (15)
1942	Fitzroy	12 (4)
1949	Melbourne	12 (18)
Total		59 (37)
- ^{1} Playing statistics correct to the end of 1949.

Leonard Harris "Barrow Boy" Toyne (12 July 1922 – 17 March 1998) was an Australian rules footballer who played for Geelong, Fitzroy and Melbourne in the Victorian Football League (VFL) during the 1940s.

Toyne, from Terang, made his way into the Geelong seniors for the first time in 1940 after serving his apprenticeship in the reserves. Because Geelong were forced into recess as a result of World War II Toyne spent the 1942 season at Fitzroy. He would be lost to football for the next two seasons due to his service with the Australian Imperial Force (AIF). Returning to Geelong in 1945, Toyne finished third in the club's 'best and fairest'.

After getting married, Toyne moved to Sandringham in 1946 to live and work. Geelong granted him a clearance which allowed him to be appointed captain-coach of Sandringham. The club had finished 11th the previous VFA season and had never reached the finals, but Toyne steered them to a seven-point grand final win over Camberwell. Toyne was noted for his novel and tactical approach to his time at Sandringham: playing under the speedy throw pass rules in place in the VFA at the time, he primarily recruited a young team of local under-23s, would kick against the wind if he won the coin toss, and would focus on his younger and fitter team coming home strongly in final quarters. So successful was Toyne's approach that it was soon emulated by other VFA clubs, and contributed in part to the VFA introducing a rule which encouraged developing young players from VFA districts by disallowing the recruitment of over-27s from the VFL (except in coaching roles).

Sandringham was runner-up in 1947 but struggled the following season, with Toyne getting suspended for three matches during 1948 after an altercation. Five rounds into the 1949 season, Toyne resigned, citing that he was being victimised by the umpires. He finished the year at Melbourne before crossing to Sturt, whom he captain-coached in 1950 and 1951. Unlike at Sandringham, Toyne could not lift Sturt: he coached them to just four wins, all against South Adelaide, in 35 games. Early in the 1951 season, Toyne retired as a player but would continue as Double Blue coach with no greater success. His final senior club was Launceston in the 1953 Northern Tasmanian Football Association season.
