= Bill Leak (sportsman) =

Australian sportsman

Personal information
- Full name: Brian Hedley Leak
- Born: 5 May 1917; Hawthorn, South Australia
- Died: 12 January 2007 (aged 89); Adelaide, South Australia
- Batting: Right-handed
- Role: Batsman

Domestic team information
- Years: Team
- 1935/36–1940/41: South Australia

Career statistics
Competition	First-class
Matches	8
Runs scored	216
Batting average	16.61
100s/50s	0/1
Top score	79
Catches/stumpings	5/–
- Source: CricketArchive, 20 April 2023

Brian Hedley "Bill" Leak (5 May 1917 – 12 January 2007) was an Australian sportsman who represented South Australia in both Australian rules football and cricket.

Leak, who was born in Adelaide and educated at Scotch College, lost some of his best sporting years to the war. In the 1930s and early 1940s, Leak represented the South Australian cricket team in eight first-class matches and played for Sturt at district level. He played as a batsman and was an outstanding fielder, winning the Talbot Smith Medal in 1939/40.

He was also a leading player for the Sturt Football Club in the South Australian National Football League (SANFL). He played his football as a centreman and was a member of Sturt's 1940 SANFL premiership winning team. An interstate representative, Leak returned to the club after the war in 1946 and was appointed captain. It was the same year that he joined Prince Alfred College, where he was involved in sports coaching.

As a state cricketer, Leak had the distinction of playing his earliest matches under the captaincy of Don Bradman. He only made South Australia's Sheffield Shield eleven on two occasions, returning a top score of 31. In fact, it wasn't until his sixth first-class match that he made a half-century, breaking the drought with an innings of 79 in a high scoring encounter with New South Wales. Leak, who was stumped four times in his short career, batted anywhere from four to seven in the batting order for South Australia.

During the war, Leak served with the Royal Australian Navy, and was stationed at the naval base HMAS Torrens in South Australia.
