= Sturt Football Club =

Australian rules football club

Names
- Full name: Sturt Football Club
- Nickname: Double Blues

2025 season
- After finals: 1st
- Home-and-away season: 1st
- Leading goalkicker: Joshua Hone (52)
- Best and fairest: Tom Lewis

Club details
- Founded: 14 March 1901; 125 years ago
- Colours: Light Blue and Navy Blue
- Competition: South Australian National Football League
- President: Jason Kilic
- CEO: Sue Dewing
- Coach: Martin Mattner
- Captain(s): Tom Lewis and Will Snelling
- Premierships: 16; 1915, 1919, 1926, 1932, 1940, 1966, 1967, 1968, 1969, 1970, 1974, 1976, 2002, 2016, 2017, 2025
- Ground: Unley Oval (capacity: 15,000)

Uniforms
Home

Other information
- Official website: sturtfc.com.au

The Sturt Football Club, nicknamed The Double Blues, is a semi-professional Australian rules football club based in the suburb of Unley, South Australia, which plays in the South Australian National Football League.

Founded in 1901 by the Sturt Cricket Club, the club initially struggled to make the finals, however, in 1915 they won their first Premiership. After several decades of substantial finals appearances and a few premiership wins, Sturt entered a period of success, winning seven premierships from 1966 to 1976 under coach Jack Oatey.

Sturt has a total of 16 premierships, sixteen Magarey Medallists and two Night Premierships.

Sturt wear Oxford and Cambridge Blue reflecting the street names on which their home ground is based. Sturt play their home games at the 15,000 capacity Unley Oval and their club song is named It's a grand old flag.

== History ==
=== Establishment ===
The Sturt Football club was established on 14 March 1901 following a meeting convened at the Unley Town Hall by the Sturt Cricket Club (established on August 9, 1890, by Arthur C Thomas) and attended by delegates from local junior teams, footballers and residents it was decided to establish a senior football club in the Sturt Electoral Division based around Unley to join the SAFA. Sturt is named after the Australian explorer Charles Sturt. The club used the two shades of blue of Oxford and Cambridge Universities as its home ground, Unley Oval, is situated on the junction of Oxford Terrace and Cambridge Terrace, hence the nickname of "Double Blues". Sturt played its first SAFA game against Norwood at Norwood Oval, losing by 33 points.

Sturt enjoyed little success initially and struggled to make the finals. In 1909, the club was strengthened by a number of interstate players enticed by offers of employment and accommodation and in 1910, Sturt played in their first Grand Final, losing to Port Adelaide.

=== First success ===
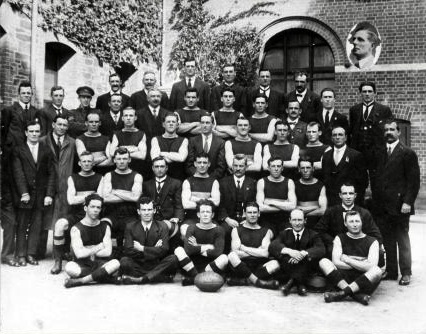
The 1919 premiership team.

The first premiership came in 1915 with a two-goal Grand Final win over Port Adelaide. The competition was suspended during the First World War, being established in 1919 when Sturt faced North Adelaide in the Grand Final. Despite giving up a big lead early, Sturt fought back and forced a draw. In a low scoring replay the following week, Sturt kicked its only three goals of the match in the last quarter (the last coming with thirty seconds remaining) to win by five points (23–18) and secure consecutive premierships four years apart.

Sturt won another premiership in 1926 defeating North Adelaide again by 64–51, with Vic Richardson after he was not selected for the 1925 Ashes cricket tour of England.

Between 1930 and 1941, Sturt played in five Grand Finals, winning in 1932 (v. North Adelaide by 110–69) and 1940 when the team beat South Adelaide (100–79). From 1942 to 1944, Sturt combined with South Adelaide to compete in a restricted wartime competition.

=== Golden era ===
From 1945 to 1961, despite the efforts of triple Magarey Medalist Len Fitzgerald, Sturt performed poorly, "winning" five wooden spoons and failing to make a Grand Final. In 1962, former Norwood and South Melbourne player and West Adelaide coach Jack Oatey was appointed coach and began to institute an innovative style of play that would modernise the game and influence the style of football played Australia wide.

Sturt showed gradual improvement in Oatey's first years, finishing 6th in 1963 and third in 1964. In 1965, it reached the grand final and before 62,543 (a SANFL record until 1976 and the highest Adelaide Oval crowd to this day), fell short by just 3 points against Port Adelaide. In 1966, Sturt gained revenge on Port Adelaide, doubling its score (16.16 to 8.8) winning its first premiership in 26 years and entering a period of dominance that saw them win seven premierships in eleven years, including five in a row between 1966 and 1970.

Sturt's 1967 and 1968 grand final wins were again at the expense of Port Adelaide. Sturt won the 1969 Grand Final beating Glenelg who had included the Richmond star Royce Hart for his only game for the club. Hart was eligible to play in the SANFL due to his posting to Adelaide as a National Service soldier. Sturt completed its fifth successive premiership with another win over Glenelg in a rain-affected 1970 grand final.

The 1976 Grand Final win over Port Adelaide was dominated by ruckman Rick Davies. Before a record Football Park crowd of 66,897, Sturt entered the final as rank outsiders. Davies, sensing early pressure from Port, positioned himself in the back lines in the first quarter. In an often quoted anecdote, coach Jack Oatey turned to runner David ( Daffy ) Edwards and said:'What's he doing down there? I didn't put him down there. I run this side. Go and ask him what he thinks he's up to." After Davies had taken his fourth strong mark, Edwards came back with the news: "He says he's down there getting kicks, that's where the ball is". Oatey's response: "Course he is. He's a champion isn't he?” Rick Davies dominated the final with 21 kicks, 21 handballs, 21 hit outs and 15 marks, with Sturt winning by 41 points. Captain Paul Bagshaw described the win as "Sturt's finest hour".

Jack Oatey's legacy has continued to influence football in South Australia. Since their inception into the AFL, the Adelaide Crows have embodied much of the approach to the game that Oatey pioneered. Oatey is also credited with popularising the checkside punt, a kicking style that causes the ball to bend away from the body. In the 1968 Grand Final against Port Adelaide Football Club, Peter Endersbee used the checkside punt to kick two goals in the space of a few minutes turning the game in Sturt's favour. Since 1981, the Jack Oatey Medal has been awarded to the best player in the SANFL Grand Final.

=== Drought ===
After Oatey's retirement at the end 1982, Sturt under coaches John Halbert and former Richmond star Mervyn Keane reached the Grand Final of 1983 with a reinvented Davies kicking 151 goals, but fluctuated in the following five years. Committee dissatisfaction with Keane, however, led to Sturt churning through five coaches and receiving a SANFL record eight consecutive wooden spoons between 1989 and 1996, including a winless season in 1995 when the team actually did not get within four goals of any of its twenty-two opponents. A joint bid with Norwood in 1994 to enter the AFL was rejected in favour of Port Adelaide. Facing financial difficulties, mergers with South Adelaide ("Southern Blues") and North Adelaide were proposed by the SANFL and the club's board. This was opposed by supporters who, along with former players, raised the required $250,000 in two weeks to keep the club in existence. Sturt returned to its original home ground Unley Oval in 1998, having moved its home games to Adelaide Oval from 1986.

=== Resurgence ===
Under Phil Carman, Sturt reached the Grand Final in 1998, losing to Port Adelaide by nine points. Damian Squire was recruited from North Adelaide the following year and won consecutive Magarey medals in 1999–2000. Jade Sheedy and Tim Weatherald went on to share the award in 2002. Sturt, under first-year coach Brenton Phillips, played Central Districts in the 2002 SANFL Grand Final. After struggling to beat Central Districts in four prior attempts in the 2002 season, the Double Blues emerged triumphant on Grand Final day, doubling the Bulldogs' score to win by 47 points. It was the club's first premiership in 26 years.

Six days after the win, several of the club's players and support staff were celebrating the win at the Sari Club in Bali when the Bali bombing incident occurred. Player Josh Deegan and trainer Bob Marshall were killed.

=== Near-closure and Back-to-Back Premierships ===
Sturt finished fifth in 2010 and 9th in 2011. After champion goal kicker Brant Chambers departed at the end of Season 2010, the club endured disappointing seasons in 2011 and 2012, finishing bottom in each year. Poor results in both seasons plus off field mismanagement resulted in a club debt of $2.2 million and almost saw the club to the grave, as reports in early 2013 stated that the club "went perilously close to closing its doors". Sturt finished seventh in 2013, but returned to the finals in 2014 finishing 3rd after the minor round only to lose in straight sets to Norwood and South Adelaide in the Qualifying and 1st Semi Finals. In 2015, Sturt finished 8th with the poor result bringing on the departure of then part-time coach Seamus Maloney.

2016 saw Sturt mount a resurgence under new coach and former premiership player Martin Mattner. The Blues Finished 3rd after the home and away season and started the final series by beating South Adelaide in the Qualifying final. They then lost to the Eagles in the second semi final but won the Preliminary Final against the Adelaide Crows a week later, by 35 points to set up a Grand Final match against Eagles. They then went on to win the 2016 premiership. The following year the Double Blues recovered from a disappointing start to their season going 0–4 to finish in the top 3 once again. They accounted for Central in the Qualifying final, lost to Port Adelaide in the Second Semi final and beat the red hot favorites the Eagles in the Preliminary final to set up a Grand Final against arch rival Port Adelaide. Sturt then went on to claim a thrilling one-point win against Port Adelaide in the 2017 Grand Final, achieving the rare back-to-back premiers feat.

Sturt entered a team in the SANFL Women's competition in 2018.

== Home Grounds ==
From the club's inception in 1901 until 1986, the Sturt Football Club played their home games at the Unley Oval. The largest attendance at Unley was set in Round 9 of the 1968 season when 22,015 crammed into the oval to see Sturt play long time rivals Port Adelaide. The unofficial ground record attendance at Unley was set on 9 June 1924 when an estimated 24,000 saw Sturt play Norwood.

In 1987 the club moved its home games to the Adelaide Oval, a move that proved unpopular with fans. After the move, the City of Unley turned the oval into a public park by removing the boundary fence, though the Jack Oatey Stand and the Members Stand remained in place. In 1996, the club negotiated with the Unley council for a return to Unley and after playing a couple of games there in 1997, Sturt permanently moved back to their original home in 1998 which coincided with the club's first Grand Final appearance since 1983.

Before 2014, Sturt was forced to hire Unley Oval for each SANFL home game, due to the council's wish that the oval remain a public park as well as paying for temporary fencing to be erected for each home game. The use of temporary fencing ended in 2014 when a white picket fence was erected at the oval.

Unley Oval was renamed Peter Motley Oval in 2015 in honour of the former two-time Sturt club champion.

- Unley Oval (1901–1986, 1997–present)
- Adelaide Oval (1987–1997)

== Club records ==
- Record Attendance at Unley Oval (confirmed): 22,015 v Port Adelaide in Round 9, 1968
- Record Attendance: 66,897 v Port Adelaide at Football Park, 1976 SANFL Grand Final
- Record Attendance since Adelaide Football Club formation (1991): 44,838 v Port Adelaide at Football Park, 1998 SANFL Grand Final
- Most Games: 360 by Paul Bagshaw (1964–80)
- Most Goals in a Season: 151 by Rick Davies in 1983
- Most Goals for the club: 672 by Brant Chambers (2001–10)
- First player to kick 100 goals in an SANFL season: Ted Biggs (1934)
- Most Years as Coach: 21 by Jack Oatey (1962–1982)
- Most Years as Captain: 8 by Paul Bagshaw (1973–1980) and Chris Thredgold (1995–2002)
- Most Premierships as Captain: 3 by John Halbert (1966, 1967, 1968)
- Most Best & Fairest Awards: 7 by Rick Davies (1973, 1974, 1975, 1976, 1978, 1979, 1980)
- Highest Score: 32.19 (211) v Woodville 19.14 (128) at Woodville Oval in Round 4, 1974

== Honours ==
=== Club ===
Premierships
Competition	Level	Wins	Years won
South Australian National Football League	Men's Seniors	16	1915, 1919, 1926, 1932, 1940, 1966, 1967, 1968, 1969, 1970, 1974, 1976, 2002, 2016, 2017, 2025
South Australian National Football League	Men's Reserves	8	1909, 1913, 1949, 1977, 1999, 2008, 2017, 2022
South Australian National Football League	Under 19s (1937–2008)	5	1951, 1958, 1964, 1984, 1987
South Australian National Football League	Under 17s (1939–2008)	8	1941, 1949, 1963, 1974, 1976, 1980, 2003, 2008
South Australian National Football League	Under 18s (2009–present)	2	2017, 2025
South Australian National Football League	Under 16s (2010–present)	2	2015, 2024
Other titles and honours
Stanley H Lewis Trophy	Multiple	6	1968, 1978, 1983, 2008, 2024, 2025
SANFL Night Premiership	Seniors	2	1954, 1975
Finishing positions
South Australian National Football League	Minor premiership (men's seniors)	10	1910, 1919, 1926, 1933, 1966, 1968, 1974, 1978, 1998, 2025
South Australian National Football League	Grand Finalists (men's seniors)	12	1910, 1924, 1931, 1936, 1941, 1965, 1978, 1983, 1998, 2009, 2023, 2026
South Australian National Football League	Wooden spoons (men's seniors)	20	1901, 1902, 1903, 1907, 1908, 1949, 1952, 1956, 1958, 1961, 1989, 1990, 1991, 1992, 1993, 1994, 1995, 1996, 2011, 2012
South Australian National Football League	Grand Finalists (women's seniors)	1	2022

=== Individual ===
==== Magarey Medalists ====
1903	Hendrick Waye
1911	Vic Cumberland
1920	Vic Richardson
1923	Horrie Riley
1933	Keith Dunn
1952	Len Fitzgerald
1954	Len Fitzgerald
1959	Len Fitzgerald
1961	John Halbert
1988	Greg Whittlesea
1997	Brodie Atkinson
1999	Damian Squire
2000	Damian Squire
2002	Tim Weatherald & Jade Sheedy
2008	Luke Crane
2014	Zane Kirkwood
2016	Zane Kirkwood
2024	Will Snelling
2025	Tom Lewis

==== Jack Oatey Medalists ====
2002	Matthew Powell
2016	Jack Stephens
2017	Fraser Evans
2025	Angus Anderson

== Hall of Fame ==
Sturt launched its Hall of Fame in 2004, with 19 inaugural inductees. There were further inductions in 2006 and 2009. Like other SANFL clubs, the players and officials are divided into broad historical eras during which they represented the club.

- Members with names in **bold** are also in the South Australian Football Hall of Fame
- Members with an asterisk* next to their names are also in the Australian Football Hall of Fame

Sturt Football Club Hall of Fame
**1901–1920 Era**
**Frank Golding**	**Bill Mayman**	**Vic Richardson**	Arthur C. Thomas
Hendrick Waye			
**1921–1960 Era**
Norman Barron	Allan Colquhoun	**Len Fitzgerald** *	Tony Goodchild
Jack Halliday	Gil Langley	**PT "Bo" Morton**	**Horrie Riley**
**Clayton Thompson**	Eddie Tilley	Jack Wadham	
**1961–1980 Era**
**Brenton Adcock**	**Paul Bagshaw** *	Tony Burgan	Colin Casey
Tony Clarkson	**Rick Davies** *	Malcolm Greenslade	**John Halbert** *
Daryl Hicks	Brendon Howard	**Ray Kutcher**	Brenton Miels
**Sandy Nelson**	**Jack Oatey** *	Roger Rigney	**Rick Schoff**
**Bob Shearman**	Terry Short	Ross Tuohy	**Leigh Whicker**
**1981–2000 Era**
**Michael Graham**			

== Honour Board ==
Indicates wooden spoon.
Indicates premiership or minor premiership.

Year	Ladder position	W–L–D	%	Finals	Coach	Captain(s)	Best & Fairest	Leading goalkicker	
1901	6th	4–8–0	38.1	6th		P Kekwick		W Colyer	14
1902	7th	1–11–0	26.4	DNQ		A Tomlin		H Burford	7
1903	7th	2–9–1	35.4	DNQ		A Tomlin		PJ Turner; H Waye	6
1904	5th	6–6–0	47.0	DNQ		G Gurr		H Waye	17
1905	5th	4–8–0	45.8	DNQ		C Fulton		H Waye	17
1906	4th	5–6–1	44.6	Semi-final		C Fulton; J Buttrose		H Waye	14
1907	7th	3–9–0	41.6	DNQ		O Hyman		A Bond; H Waye	12
1908	7th	0–12–0	33.0	DNQ		O Hyman		H Limb	10
1909	5th	6–6–0	55.2	DNQ	H Cumberland; F Dunne; E Renfrey	E Renfrey		H Limb	17
1910	1st	11–2–0	60.0	Runners-up	E Renfrey	E Renfrey		H Limb	38
1911	4th	6–6–0	47.1	Semi-final	E Renfrey	E Renfrey		H Cumberland	13
1912	4th	5–7–0	45.0	Semi-final	E Renfrey	E Renfrey		F Golding	11
1913	3rd	7–5–0	56.4	Semi-final	J Bannigan; E Renfrey	J Bannigan; E Renfrey	E Kappler	F Golding	30
1914	3rd	6–6–0	45.4	Semi-final	B Mayman	B Mayman	B Mayman	F Golding	29
1915	4th	6–6–0	48.7	Premiers	B Mayman	B Mayman	A Limb	R Neate	17
The SAFL was suspended between 1916 and 1918 due to World War I.
1919	1st	10–2–0	57.8	Premiers	B Mayman	B Mayman		F Golding	24
1920	5th	5–6–1	50.3	DNQ	V Richardson	V Richardson	D Sharp	F Golding	30
1921	4th	8–6–0	52.5	Semi-final	F Golding	F Golding	A Odgers	F Golding	38
1922	7th	5–8–1	50.1	DNQ	V Richardson	V Richardson	V Richardson	H Lyne	27
1923	2nd	10–4–0	57.7	Semi-final	V Richardson	V Richardson	V Richardson	K Jackson; A Waters	31
1924	2nd	10–4–0	56.2	Runners-up	V Richardson	V Richardson	N Barron	K Jackson; G Scrutton	40
1925	3rd	8–6–0	54.9	Semi-final	F Golding	F Golding	C Scrutton	K Jackson	51
1926	1st	10–4–0	56.1	Premiers	F Golding	F Golding	C Scrutton	G Scrutton	34
1927	5th	10–7–0	49.3	DNQ	F Golding	F Golding	A Weller	G Scrutton	35
1928	6th	6–9–2	47.3	DNQ	F Golding	C Whitehead	C Scrutton	G Scrutton	28
1929	6th	6–11–0	46.3	DNQ	W Martin; SC White	W Martin	V Bateman	G Green; E Sims	25
1930	3rd	11–6–0	53.2	Semi-final	SC White	V Bateman; H Riley	V Bateman	P Morton	37
1931	2nd	14–3–1	55.9	Runners-up	SC White	V Bateman	R Treleaven	P Morton	77
1932	4th	9–7–1	52.4	Premiers	SC White	V Bateman	R Treleaven	G Green	54
1933	1st	13–4–0	56.0	Semi-final	SC White	V Bateman; C Parsons	WK Dunn	G Green	80
1934	4th	10–7–0	50.6	Semi-final	SC White	C Parsons	L King	A Wundersitz	46
1935	4th	10–6–1	51.7	Semi-final	SC White	L King	G Day	A Wundersitz	55
1936	2nd	12–5–0	54.0	Runners-up	SC White	L King	L King	A Longmore	59
1937	6th	5–11–1	47.3	DNQ	SC White	L King	P Morton	P Morton	53
1938	6th	5–12–0	46.9	DNQ	W Scott	P Morton	L King; R Treleaven	P Morton	56
1939	6th	6–11–0	48.5	DNQ	W Scott	P Morton	P Morton	P Morton	84
1940	2nd	13–4–0	55.3	Premiers	P Morton	P Morton	P Morton	P Morton	101
1941	2nd	12–5–0	53.2	Runners-up	R Green	R Green	B Leak	E Biggs	75
Sturt combined with South Adelaide between 1942 and 1944 due to World War II.
1945	5th	8–9–0	55.2	DNQ	R Green	G Langley	G Langley	E Leske	51
1946	4th	10–7–0	53.0	Semi-final	P Morton	B Leak	G Langley	F Gibson	41
1947	3rd	10–7–0	53.3	Semi-final	R Green	G Langley	E Tilley	E Pynor	60
1948	4th	10–7–0	52.7	Semi-final	R Green	E Tilley	D Yeo	G Langley	40
1949	8th	3–14–0	40.9	DNQ	H Tuohy	L Giles	E Tilley	C Thompson	38
1950	7th	2–15–0	38.2	DNQ	L Toyne	L Toyne	L Fry	C Thompson	32
1951	7th	2–16–0	39.6	DNQ	L Toyne	L Fitzgerald; L Toyne	C Thompson	P Caust	29
1952	8th	3–14–0	40.8	DNQ	L Fitzgerald	L Fitzgerald	L Fitzgerald	F Cave	22
1953	7th	5–13–0	44.4	DNQ	L Fitzgerald	L Fitzgerald	L Fitzgerald	C Thompson	36
1954	6th	8–10–0	47.0	DNQ	L Fitzgerald	L Fitzgerald	L Fitzgerald	L Fitzgerald	41
1955	4th	9–8–0	51.2	Semi-final	L Fitzgerald	L Fitzgerald	W May	P Caust	57
1956	8th	4–14–1	40.4	DNQ	W May	W May	A Goodchild	P Caust	39
1957	5th	8–10–0	48.8	DNQ	E Tilley	A Goodchild	A Goodchild	D Olds	36
1958	8th	2–15–1	42.3	DNQ	E Tilley	A Goodchild	J Halbert	D Olds	27
1959	3rd	10–8–0	52.0	Semi-final	G Williams	G Williams	C Thompson	D Douglas	47
1960	6th	8–10–0	51.3	DNQ	G Williams	G Williams	J Halbert	D Douglas	50
1961	8th	3–16–0	42.7	DNQ	G Williams	G Williams	J Halbert	R Schoff	26
1962	7th	4–15–0	41.1	DNQ	J Oatey	J Halbert	D Hicks	D Hicks	49
1963	6th	10–10–0	46.9	DNQ	J Oatey	J Halbert	T Short	E Langridge	37
1964	3rd	14–6–0	55.9	Semi-final	J Oatey	J Halbert	J Halbert	R Sawley	70
1965	3rd	13–7–0	57.6	Runners-up	J Oatey	J Halbert	A Clarkson	M Jones	73
1966	1st	18–2–0	60.9	Premiers	J Oatey	J Halbert	P Bagshaw	M Jones	73
1967	2nd	15–4–1	58.9	Premiers	J Oatey	J Halbert	A Clarkson	M Greenslade	54
1968	1st	18–2–0	59.7	Premiers	J Oatey	J Halbert	R Schoff	K Chessell	40
1969	2nd	15–5–0	58.9	Premiers	J Oatey	R Shearman	P Bagshaw	M Greenslade	85
1970	2nd	17–3–0	59.4	Premiers	J Oatey	R Shearman	P Bagshaw	M Greenslade	82
1971	3rd	15–6–0	59.8	Semi-final	J Oatey	R Shearman	P Bagshaw	M Greenslade	49
1972	5th	11–10–0	54.8	DNQ	J Oatey	R Shearman	C Casey	M Greenslade	78
1973	2nd	17–4–0	61.1	Semi-final	J Oatey	P Bagshaw	ER Davies	K Whelan	107
1974	1st	19–3–0	62.1	Premiers	J Oatey	P Bagshaw	ER Davies	K Whelan	108
1976	3rd	15–5–0	60.9	Semi-finals	J Oatey	P Bagshaw	ER Davies	K Whelan	80
1976	2nd	14–6–1	57.5	Premiers	J Oatey	P Bagshaw	ER Davies	M Greenslade	55
1977	7th	9–12–1	49.7	DNQ	J Oatey	P Bagshaw	P Bagshaw	M Greenslade	55
1978	1st	21–1–0	61.2	Runners-up	J Oatey	P Bagshaw	ER Davies	P Bagshaw	74
1979	9th	9–13–0	47.8	DNQ	J Oatey	P Bagshaw	ER Davies	P Heinrich	51
1980	3rd	13–9–0	51.6	Preliminary final	J Oatey	P Bagshaw	ER Davies	P Hollis	70
1981	6th	11–10–1	49.7	DNQ	J Oatey	B Howard	E Fry	P Hollis	65
1982	3rd	15–7–0	56.3	Semi-final	J Oatey	ER Davies	F Spiel	ER Davies	98
1983	2nd	16–6–0	57.1	Runners-up	J Halbert	ER Davies	J Paynter	ER Davies	151
1984	7th	8–14–0	46.5	DNQ	J Halbert	ER Davies	P Motley	ER Davies	102
1985	8th	12–9–1	52.6	Elimination final	M Keane	N Craig	P Motley	I Willmott	123
1986	8th	9–13–0	46.3	DNQ	M Keane	N Craig	J Paynter	I Willmott	82
1987	9th	13–9–0	51.8	DNQ	M Keane	G Whittlesea	G Whittlesea	I Willmott	51
1988	5th	13–9–0	51.8	Elimination final	M Keane	G Whittlesea	G Whittlesea	L Schache	63
1989	10th	4–18–0	42.9	DNQ	ER Davies	G Whittlesea	J Paynter	I Willmott	39
1990	10th	2–18–0	37.2	DNQ	K Higgins	G Whittlesea	A Johns	S Radbone	30
1991	9th	3–19–0	38.1	DNQ	S Trigg	J Paynter	J Paynter	J Stevenson	76
1992	9th	2–20–0	37.6	DNQ	S Trigg	J Paynter	S Field	J Stevenson	47
1993	9th	4–16–0	41.3	DNQ	H Bunton	J Viney	A Johns	J Arnol	71
1994	9th	5–17–0	42.4	DNQ	H Bunton	J Viney	B Lennon	J Arnol	37
1995	9th	0–22–0	32.2	DNQ	P Carman	C Thredgold	S Feast	J Burton	33
1996	9th	4–16–0	38.8	DNQ	P Carman	C Thredgold	J May	S Dennis	21
1997	4th	11–7–2	50.7	Elimination final	P Carman	C Thredgold	B Atkinson	SM White	33
1998	1st	16–4–0	56.0	Runners-up	P Carman	C Thredgold	S Feast	J Burton	68
1999	4th	12–8–0	53.6	Elimination final	P Carman	C Thredgold	D Squire	J Burton	62
2000	4th	12–8–0	51.7	Preliminary final	P Carman	C Thredgold	B Lennon	SM White	36
2001	6th	9–11–0	52.1	DNQ	P Carman	C Thredgold	S Maloney	SM White	56
2002	3rd	16–3–0	56.7	Premiers	B Phillips	C Thredgold	T Weatherald	B Chambers	61
2003	3rd	13–7–0	56.2	Semi-final	B Phillips	S Maloney	B Nelson	B Chambers	64
2004	3rd	12–8–0	54.4	Preliminary final	B Phillips	B Nelson	J Sheedy	B Chambers	58
2005	5th	11–9–0	49.8	Elimination final	B Phillips	B Nelson	D Squire	B Chambers	46
2006	8th	3–17–0	38.3	DNQ	B Atkinson; B Phillips	B Nelson	J Sheedy	B Chambers	69
2007	4th	12–8–0	52.1	Elimination final	R Macgowan	B Nelson; J Sheedy	L Crane	B Chambers	112
2008	2nd	15–5–0	61.4	Preliminary final	R Macgowan	B Nelson; J Sheedy	J Sheedy	B Chambers	109
2009	3rd	14–6–1	59.7	Runners-up	L Norman	J Sheedy	J Sheedy	B Chambers	82
2010	4th	11–8–1	52.5	Elimination final	L Norman	J Sheedy	J Giles	B Chambers	48
2011	9th	5–15–0	44.6	DNQ	L Norman	J Sheedy	L Crane	M Duldig	52
2012	9th	6–14–0	44.1	DNQ	S Maloney	J Sheedy	R Tambling	T McIntyre	49
2013	7th	7–13–0	45.4	DNQ	S Maloney	M Coad	B Kane	M Duldig	33
2014	3rd	11–7–0	54.4	Semi-final	S Maloney	M Coad	Z Kirkwood	M Coad	51
2015	8th	6–12–0	46.9	DNQ	S Maloney	M Coad; Z Kirkwood	Z Kirkwood	B Hansen	23
2016	3rd	13–4–1	54.6	Premiers	M Mattner	Z Kirkwood	Z Kirkwood	K Beard	55
2017	3rd	12–5–1	54.9	Premiers	M Mattner	Z Kirkwood	Z Kirkwood	K Beard	62
2018	3rd	12–6–0	55.1	Semi-final	M Mattner	Z Kirkwood	T Harms	M Evans	42
2019	4th	11–7–0	52.4	Elimination final	N Grima	Z Kirkwood	S Colquhoun	J Hone	35
2020	6th	5–9–0	47.8	DNQ	N Grima	J Battersby	J Battersby	M Evans; J Sutcliffe	14
2021	6th	9–9–0	52.9	DNQ	M Mattner	J Battersby	C Voss	A Davis	20
2022	5th	11–7–0	52.5	Elimination final	M Mattner	J Battersby	C Voss	A Davis	36
2023	2nd	14–4–0	51.9	Runners-up	M Mattner	J Battersby	J Battersby	J Hone	45
2024	2nd	15–3–0	59.9	Semi-final	M Mattner	J Battersby	W Snelling	C McFadyen	35
2025	1st	17–1–0	63.7	Premiers	M Mattner	J Battersby	T Lewis	J Hone	52
2026	3rd	13–5–0	57.6	Runners-up	M Mattner	T Lewis	R Illman	J Hone	36

== Current playing list ==
Sturt Football Club
Senior list			Coaching Staff
1 Sam Conforti; 2 Tom Lewis (c); 3 Martin Frederick; 4 Morgan Ferres; 5 Josh Hone; 6 Charlie Fryer; 7 Loch Rawlinson; 8 Sam Waltham; 9 Sam Breuer; 10 Tom Emmett; 11 Louis Kellaway; 12 Mitch Crowden; 13 Oscar Merrett; 14 Will Snelling (vc); 15 Luke Edmonds; 16 Jared Dakin; 17 Zac Becker; 18 Daniel Fahey-Sparks; 19 Daniel Schoell; 20 Luca Slade; 21 Nick Sadler	22 William Coomblas (vc); 23 Jed McEntee; 24 Kobe McEntee; 25 Ned Walter; 26 Sam Hindes; 27 Thomas McCourt; 28 Charlie Parker; 29 James White; 30 Oliver Grivell; 31 Lachlan Burrows; 32 Rory Illman; 33 Hamish Anderson; 34 Casey Voss; 35 Lachlan May; 36 Sam White; 37 Alex Holt; 38 Noah Goldie; 38 Jasper Maher; 39 Isaiah Faddoul; 40 Ash Johnson; 41 Marcus Pavlic	42 Willa Taylor; 43 Noah Prenzler; 44 Will Torode; 45 Amos Doyle; 46 Henry Maerschel; 47 Hugo Kittel; 48 Ed Schultz; 49 Jackson Moody; 51 Felix Katsaros; 52 Kurtis Ridley; 53 Max Barilla; 55 Eli Anders; 56 Noah Menillo; 57 Gillon Wakelin; 58 Max MacDonald; 59 Eli Nightingale; 60 Oscar Finnis; 61 Tadhg Brophy; 62 Tom Turnbull; 63 Dougal Grieve	Head coach: Martin Mattner; Legend: (c) Captain(s); (vc) Vice-captain(s)

== Club song ==
The Sturt Football Club's song is It's A Grand Old Flag, sung to tune of You're A Grand Old Flag.

It's a Grand old flag, It's a high-flying flag
It's the emblem for me and for you
It's the emblem of the team we love
The team of the old Double Blues
Every heart beats true for the old Double Blues
As we sing this song to you (what do we sing?)
Should old acquaintance be forgot
Oh keep your eye on the Old Double Blues!
