= Bruce Lennon =

Australian rules footballer

Personal information
- Full name: Bruce C. Lennon
- Born: 1 December 1970 (age 55)
- Original team: Sturt (SANFL)
- Draft: No. 33, 1988 national draft
- Height: 188 cm (6 ft 2 in)
- Weight: 84 kg (185 lb)

Playing career^{1}
Years	Club	Games (Goals)
1992–1993	Richmond	28 (7)
- ^{1} Playing statistics correct to the end of 1993.

Bruce C. Lennon (born 1 December 1970) is a former Australian rules footballer who played with Sturt in the South Australian National Football League (SANFL) and Richmond in the Australian Football League (AFL).

Lennon was the 33rd selection of the 1988 National Draft, taken by Richmond. He had to wait until round six of the 1992 AFL season to make his debut, but then missed just one game for the rest of the year. Lennon made a further 10 appearances in 1993.

Back at Sturt in 1994, Lennon won the first of two best and fairest awards, the other coming in 2000. He retired in 2002 after 209 games for Sturt.
