= Eddie Tilley =

Australian rules footballer

Personal information
- Full name: Edwin George Tilley
- Born: 14 October 1920; Sturt, South Australia
- Died: 22 July 2006 (aged 85)

Playing career^{1}
Years	Club	Games (Goals)
1939–1950	Sturt (SANFL)	127 (54)
Total		127 (54)

Representative team honours
Years	Team	Games (Goals)
	South Australia	9

Coaching career
Years	Club	Games (W–L–D)
1957–1958	Sturt (SANFL)	36 (10–25–1)
- ^{1} Playing statistics correct to the end of 1950.

Career highlights
- 2 x Sturt Best and Fairest 1947, 1949; Sturt Captain 1948; Sturt Hall of Fame inductee 2009; Sturt Player Life Member; SANFL Player Life Member

Eddie Tilley (14 October 1920 – 22 July 2006) was an Australian rules footballer and coach who played for Sturt in the South Australian National Football League (SANFL).
