= Tony Goodchild =

Australian rules footballer

Personal information
- Full name: Anthony Goodchild
- Original team: Roseworthy College
- Position: Forward/ruck

Playing career^{1}
Years	Club	Games (Goals)
1953-1962	Sturt (SANFL)	132 (128)
Total		132 (128)

Representative team honours
Years	Team	Games (Goals)
	South Australia	7 (12)
- ^{1} Playing statistics correct to the end of 1962.

Career highlights
- 2 x Sturt Best and Fairest 1956, 1957; Sturt Captain 1958-59; Sturt Team of the Twentieth Century (half-forward flank); 4 x The Advertiser SANFL Team of the Year 1956, 1957, 1959, 1960; T.S. O'Halloran Trophy 1959; Sturt Hall of Fame Inductee; Hahndorf (Hills Central FA) Premiership 1963

Tony Goodchild is a former Australian rules footballer who played for Sturt in the South Australian National Football League (SANFL). According to Jeff Pash, Goodchild was "the hardiest marker of them all. He gets grimly to that front position, sets himself, and stays there. Strength, with that characteristic habit of determination, does it". In 1959, Goodchild was awarded the T.S. O'Halloran Trophy as best on ground for South Australia against Victoria.

Following retirement from Sturt, Goodchild shifted to Hahndorf for one season, where he was a member of their 1963 Hills Central Football Association Premiership.
