= Malcolm Greenslade =

Australian rules footballer

Personal information
- Born: 17 June 1948 (age 78)
- Original team: Unley High School
- Height: 188 cm (6 ft 2 in)
- Weight: 85.5 kg (188 lb)

Playing career
Years	Club	Games (Goals)
1966–1977	Sturt	215 (607)
1971	Richmond	2 (7)
1979–1981	Glenelg	24 (8)
Total		241 (622)

Career highlights
- Interstate Games:- 4; 100 Tiger Treasures "Mark of the Century" nominee; SANFL 10th All-time Leading Goalkicker

Malcolm Greenslade (born 17 June 1948) is a former Australian rules football player who was part of the successful Sturt team which dominated the SANFL competition in the late 1960s. He played two matches for VFL club Richmond while posted on National Service duty in Melbourne 1971, and finished his playing career with Glenelg.

Greenslade made his name as a goal-kicking forward with Sturt in the SANFL. During his 215-game career with the Double Blues he kicked 607 goals, led their goal-kicking on five occasions and played in their 1967, 1969 and 1970 premiership sides. Greenslade kicked nine of Sturt's 24 goals in the 1969 Grand Final win over Glenelg. Later in his career he moved to full-back and played his final three seasons for Glenelg. In 1981, his final season, he was captain and best & fairest for the Glenelg reserves premiership side. He was a student and later a sports teacher at Unley High School.

His two VFL games came whilst he was on National Service training in Melbourne. Kicking one goal against the Saints on debut, the next week he and fellow Sturt footballer and conscript, Michael Nunan, played for Richmond against South Melbourne and Greenslade kicked six goals. Greenslade would then be sidelined by a thigh muscle injury, while Nunan was unable to train or play because of army duties. The two Double Blues would return home after Sturt claimed their services in mid-May. In just his two games at Richmond, Greenslade was nominated for "Mark of the Century" during Richmond's century year of VFL/AFL competition.
