= Jade Sheedy =

Australian rules footballer

Personal information
- Full name: Jade Sheedy
- Born: 18 December 1979 (age 46)
- Original team: Mildura Imperials
- Height: 181 cm (5 ft 11 in)
- Weight: 78 kg (172 lb)

Playing career^{1}
Years	Club	Games (Goals)
2000–2012	Sturt	255 (117)
- ^{1} Playing statistics correct to the end of 2012.

Career highlights
- SANFL premiership player: 2002; Magarey Medal: 2002; 3x SANFL premiership coach: 2020, 2021, 2026

Jade Sheedy (born 18 December 1979) is a former Australian rules footballer who played with the Sturt Football Club in the South Australian National Football League (SANFL).

Recruited to Sturt from Mildura club Imperials in 2000, Sheedy was a member of the Sturt premiership team of 2002, a year he won the Magarey Medal with teammate Tim Weatherald. He was Sturt captain from 2007 to 2012 and captained the state football team in 2008 and 2009.

Sheedy was appointed league coach of Woodville-West Torrens in 2020 and guided the Eagles to a Premiership in his first season at the helm, defeating North Adelaide by 39 points in the Grand Final.

In 2021, he coached the SANFL State team to victory over Western Australia at Adelaide Oval. Also in 2021 he became the first Woodville-West Torrens coach to lead the team to back to back premierships defeating minor premiers Glenelg at Adelaide Oval.
