= Clarrie Scrutton =

Australian rules footballer

Personal information
- Full name: Clarence Scrutton
- Born: 26 March 1899; Terowie, South Australia
- Died: 24 September 1982 (aged 83); Adelaide, South Australia
- Original team: Kenilworth
- Height: 177 cm (5 ft 10 in)
- Weight: 70 kg (154 lb)
- Position: Wing

Playing career^{1}
Years	Club	Games (Goals)
1922–1929	Sturt	111 (7)

Representative team honours
Years	Team	Games (Goals)
	South Australia	8
- ^{1} Playing statistics correct to the end of 1929.

Career highlights
- Sturt premiership 1926; 3x Sturt Best and Fairest 1925, 1926, 1928; Sturt Team of the Century (Wing)

Clarrie Scrutton (26 March 1899 – 24 September 1982) was an Australian rules footballer who played with Sturt in the South Australian National Football League (SANFL).

On 5 May 1923, Clarrie, alongside Stan and Gordon became part of the first trio of brothers to play for Sturt at the same time.
