= Seamus Maloney =

Australian rules footballer

Personal information
- Full name: Seamus Maloney
- Original team: Mildura Imperials
- Position: Half back

Playing career^{1}
Years	Club	Games (Goals)
1996–2003	Sturt	152 (0)

Coaching career^{3}
Years	Club	Games (W–L–D)
2012–2015	Sturt	78 (30–48–0)
- ^{1} Playing statistics correct to the end of 2003.^{3} Coaching statistics correct as of 2015.

Career highlights
- SANFL premiership 2002 (act. captain); Sturt Best and Fairest 2001

Seamus Maloney is a former Australian rules footballer who played for Sturt in the South Australian National Football League (SANFL) from 1996 to 2003. For four seasons from 2012 he was the head coach of the Sturt Football Club, resigning from the role at the end the 2015 season.

== Playing career ==
Playing as a running defender/half back, Maloney played 152 games for Sturt from 1996 to 2003, winning the best and fairest in 2001 and was acting captain for the 2002 premiership.

== SANFL retirement ==
In 2004, Maloney moved to Mildura and returned to Imperials in the Sunraysia Football League where he played in the 2004 premiership and coached them (as a playing coach) to the 2005 and 2008 premierships. In 2011, he returned to Adelaide where he re-joined Sturt as an assistant coach.

== Coaching ==
Maloney was appointed as coach of Sturt following the end of the 2011 season, his contract was extended at the end of the 2013 season. He resigned from Sturt at the end of the 2015 season.

=== Coaching statistics ===
Season	Team	Games coached	Wins	Losses	Draws	%	Final position
2012	Sturt	20	6	14	0	44.06%	9th of 9 (Wooden spoon)
2013	Sturt	20	7	13	0	45.84%	7th of 9
2014	Sturt	20	11	9	0	52.72%	4th of 10
2015	Sturt	18	6	12	0	46.94%	8th of 10
Career totals (end 2015)		78	30	48	0		
