= Luke Crane =

Australian rules footballer

Personal information
- Full name: Luke Crane
- Born: 23 June 1985 (age 41)
- Original teams: George Town, Zillmere Eagles
- Height: 170 cm (5 ft 7 in)
- Weight: 70 kg (154 lb)
- Position: Midfielder

Playing career^{1}
Years	Club	Games (Goals)
2007–2013	Sturt	125 (113)
- ^{1} Playing statistics correct to the end of 2013.

Luke Crane (born 23 June 1985) is a former Australian rules footballer who played with Sturt Football Club in the South Australian National Football League (SANFL).

Originally from George Town in Tasmania, Crane was recruited to Sturt from Queensland club Zillmere. He played 125 games for Sturt and won the 2008 Magarey Medal as the best and fairest player in the SANFL.
