= 1940 SANFL season =

- Teams: 8
- Premiers: Sturt; 5th premiership
- Minor premiers: Port Adelaide; 20th minor premiership
- Magarey Medallist: Mel Brock; Glenelg
- Ken Farmer Medallist: Ken Farmer; North Adelaide (125 Goals)
- Matches played: 72
- Highest: 28,500 (Grand Final, Sturt vs. South Adelaide)

The 1940 South Australian National Football League season was the 61st season of the top-level Australian rules football competition in South Australia.

== Ladder ==
1940 SANFL Ladder
Pos	Team	Pld	W	L	D	PF	PA	PP	Pts
1	Port Adelaide	17	14	3	0	1768	1502	54.07	28
2	Sturt (P)	17	13	4	0	2013	1628	55.29	26
3	South Adelaide	17	12	5	0	2104	1704	55.25	24
4	Norwood	17	8	9	0	1844	1691	52.16	16
5	West Adelaide	17	6	10	1	1756	1899	48.04	13
6	North Adelaide	17	6	11	0	1720	1859	48.06	12
7	West Torrens	17	5	11	1	1531	1806	45.88	11
8	Glenelg	17	3	14	0	1488	2135	41.07	6

Rules for classification: 1) points; 2) percentage; 3) number of points for.
(P) Premiers

== Finals series ==
=== Grand Final ===
1940 SANFL Grand Final
Saturday, 28 September	Sturt	def.	South Adelaide	Adelaide Oval (crowd: 28,500)
4.5 (29); 5.6 (36); 11.10 (76); 14.16 (100)	Q1; Q2; Q3; Final	0.0 (0); 4.6 (30); 6.9 (45); 11.13 (79)
