= 1915 SAFL Grand Final =

| Sturt | Port Adelaide |
|---|---|
| 6.10 (46) | 4.10 (34) |
| | 1 | 2 | 3 | 4 |
|---|---|---|---|---|
| STU | 2.1 (13) | 3.5 (23) | 6.7 (43) | 6.10 (46) |
| PTA | 3.1 (19) | 3.4 (22) | 4.5 (29) | 4.10 (34) |
- Date: Saturday, 2 October
- Stadium: Adelaide Oval
- Attendance: 13,000
- Coin toss won by: Port Adelaide

The 1915 SAFL Grand Final was an Australian rules football competition. Sturt beat Port Adelaide by 12 points (46 to 34).

Teams:
Sturt — Bruce, Curnow, Golding, Edwards, Hicks, J. Kappler, Limb, Mayman (captain), McNanmara, McDougall, Noal, Nicolle, Ryan, T.Richardson, V.Richardson, Sharp, Smith and Rayner.
Port Adelaide — Andersen, Ashley, Causby, Channon, Congear, Eaton, Hosking, Lackmann, Lincoln, Magor, Maynard, MacFarlane (captain), Pope, Robertson, Taylor, Tobin and Wisdom.
