= 1919 SAFL Grand Final =

| Sturt | North Adelaide |
|---|---|
| 3.5 (23) | 2.6 (18) |
- Date: Saturday, 8 October
- Stadium: Adelaide Oval
- Attendance: 35,000

The 1919 SAFL Grand Final was an Australian rules football competition. Sturt drew with North Adelaide 5.9 (39) to 5.9 (39). This was the second time in the competition's history that a Grand Final had been drawn, and the most recent. Sturt won the Grand Final Replay a week later, 3.5 (23) to 2.6 (18).

== 1919 SAFA Premiership Football Match ==
Grand Final
Saturday 27 September | Sturt | drew with | North Adelaide | Adelaide Oval (crowd: 30,000)
0.1; 4.4; 4.6; 5.9 (39) | Q1; Q2; Q3; Final | 4.3; 5.3; 5.4; 5.9 (39)

== 1919 SAFL Premiership Football Match Replay ==
Grand Final Replay
Wednesday 8 October | Sturt | def. | North Adelaide | Adelaide Oval (crowd: 35,000)
0.2; 0.3; 0.4; 3.5 (23) | Q1; Q2; Q3; Final | 0.3; 1.4; 2.6; 2.6 (18)
