= 1998 SANFL Grand Final =

Sturt	Port Adelaide
9.12 (66)	11.9 (75)
	1	2	3	4
STU	2.4 (16)	4.8 (32)	5.12 (42)	9.12 (66)
PA	2.2 (14)	4.4 (28)	7.7 (49)	11.9 (75)
- Date: Sunday, 4 October (2:40 pm)
- Stadium: Football Park
- Attendance: 44,838
- Umpires: Pfeiffer, Avon, Woodcock

The 1998 SANFL Grand Final was an Australian rules football competition. Port Adelaide beat Sturt by 75 to 66.
