= Len Fitzgerald =

Australian rules footballer and coach

Personal information
- Born: 7 May 1929
- Died: 17 April 2007 (aged 77); Adelaide
- Original team: Collingwood Technical School
- Height: 6 ft 0 in (183 cm)
- Weight: 13 st 8 lb (86 kg)

Playing career^{1}
Years	Club	Games (Goals)
1945–1950	Collingwood	96 (49)
1951–1955, 1959–1962	Sturt	125 (201)

Representative team honours
Years	Team	Games (Goals)
	Victoria	2
	South Australia	20

Coaching career^{3}
Years	Club	Games (W–L–D)
1952–1955	Sturt	72 (26–46–0)
1964–1966	Glenelg	61 (25–34–2)
- ^{1} Playing statistics correct to the end of 1962.^{3} Coaching statistics correct as of 1966.

Career highlights
- Sturt captain 1952-1955; Sturt best and fairest 1952, 1953 and 1954; Magarey Medallist, 1952, 1954 and 1959; All-Australian 1953; Australian Football Hall of Fame inductee 1996; SANFL Hall of Fame inductee 2002

Len Fitzgerald (7 May 1929 – 17 April 2007) was an Australian rules footballer in the Victorian Football League (VFL) and South Australian National Football League (SANFL). At various time he played in the positions of centre half-forward, centre half-back and ruck-rover.

== VFL career ==
Fitzgerald started his career at Collingwood at the age of 15, in 1945.

== Move to SANFL ==
In 1951 he transferred to Sturt in the South Australian competition, in order to gain the better paying employment proffered by Sturt at Myer. One source has suggested that the move was engineered by Collingwood powerbroker John Wren at the behest of a political ally in South Australia.

== SANFL career ==
Arriving at Sturt in 1951, Fitzgerald was appointed captain after three games, and took over the coaching role the following season. Fitzgerald won his first Magarey Medal in 1952, and won two more in 1954 and 1959.

In 1955 Sturt got to the preliminary final. Fitzgerald transferred to the Ovens and Murray League for the next three seasons, coaching and playing for Benalla.

Fitzgerald returned to Sturt in 1959. Fitzgerald finished his playing career in 1962 after playing 127 games for Sturt, kicking 201 goals and winning the club's best and fairest award three times. He represented his adopted state of South Australia 20 times and was named an All Australian in the 1953 Adelaide Carnival.

Fitzgerald coached Glenelg for four seasons after his retirement as a player, but with little success.

He was inducted into the Australian Football Hall of Fame in 1996 and the SANFL Hall of Fame in 2002, as one of the inaugural inductees in each.
