= Tim Weatherald =

Australian rules footballer

Personal information
- Full name: Timothy Weatherald
- Born: 31 July 1977 (age 49)

Playing career^{1}
Years	Club	Games (Goals)
1995–2007	Sturt	253 (206)
2008–2010	Norwood	58 (17)
Total		311 (223)
- ^{1} Playing statistics correct to the end of 2010.

Career highlights
- SANFL premiership player: 2002; Magarey Medal: 2002; Sturt Football Club best and fairest: 2002

Tim Weatherald (born 31 July 1977) is a former Australian rules footballer with Norwood and Sturt in the South Australian National Football League (SANFL). He played 253 games with the Sturt Football Club, but left in 2008 to join the Redlegs. He won the 2002 Magarey Medal, jointly with his Sturt teammate Jade Sheedy, and that same year won the club's best and fairest and was a member of Sturt's 2002 premiership team.

Weatherald was part of the team celebrations that were cruelly cut short by the Bali bombing and wrote a book about his experiences.

After 13 years with Sturt, in 2008 Weatherald moved to Norwood, where he played until his retirement in 2010.
