= Brant Chambers =

Australian rules footballer

Personal information
- Born: 4 January 1980 (age 46)
- Original team: Gembrook/Cockatoo
- Height: 193 cm (6 ft 4 in)
- Weight: 93 kg (205 lb)
- Position: Full-forward

Playing career
Years	Club	Games (Goals)
2000, 2012	Subiaco	21 (19)
2001–2010	Sturt	204 (672)
Total		225 (691)

Representative team honours
Years	Team	Games (Goals)
- Northern Territory
	South Australia	4 (14)

Career highlights
- 3x Ken Farmer Medalist: 2007, 2008, 2009

Brant Chambers (born 4 January 1980) is an Australian rules footballer who played for Subiaco Football Club in the West Australian Football League (WAFL) and for Sturt in the South Australian National Football League (SANFL).

== Playing career ==
Chambers played junior football for Eastern Range in Victoria, later playing for Gembrook Cockatoo Football Club.

In 2000 Chambers played eight matches for Subiaco in Westar Rules. (Note: The West Australian Football League was known as "Westar Rules" between 1997 and 2000.)

Chambers played several seasons for Nightcliff in the Northern Territory Football League from 2000/01. In January 2001 he represented the Northern Territory in a match against Port Adelaide.

Chambers was recruited by SANFL club Sturt for 2001. In 2002 he played in Sturt's premiership side. Between 2001 and 2010 he played 204 games and kicked 672 goals, placing him seventh on the all-time list of SANFL goalkickers. He won the Ken Farmer Medal for the SANFL's leading goal kicker three times; kicking 106 goals in 2007 (Note: The last time as of 2026 that any SANFL player has kicked over 100 goals in a season), 97 in 2008 and 80 in 2009. He left the Double Blues before the 2011 season, moving to Orange, New South Wales, where he worked as a scaffolder.

In early 2012, Chambers rejoined Subiaco having not played in 2011. He made his return to league football in round five.

Chambers is currently employed in the Pilbara region of Western Australia as a barge master in the marine industry.
