= Oscar Hyman =

Australian rules footballer

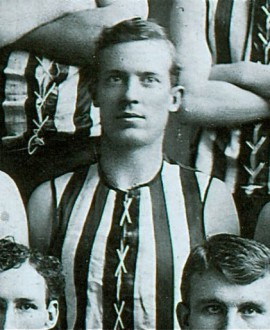
- Hyman in 1906

Personal information
- Full name: Oscar Henric Hyman
- Born: 25 November 1877; Mitcham, South Australia
- Died: 11 January 1955 (aged 77); Adelaide, South Australia
- Height: 180 cm (5 ft 11 in)
- Weight: 73 kg (161 lb)

Playing career^{1}
| Years | Club | Games (Goals) |
| 1896–1900 | South Adelaide | 41 (19) |
| 1901 | Collingwood | 13 (1) |
| 1902 | West Torrens | 12 (3) |
| 1903–1904 | North Adelaide | 15 (10) |
| 1905–1906 | Collingwood | 28 (11) |
| 1907–1909 | Sturt | 35 (16) |

Representative team honours
| Years | Team | Games (Goals) |
| | South Australia | 9 |
- ^{1} Playing statistics correct to the end of 1909.

Career highlights
- South Adelaide premiership player 1896, 1898, 1899; West Torrens captain 1902; Sturt captain 1907–1908

Oscar Henric Hyman (25 November 1877 – 11 January 1955) was an Australian rules footballer who played with Collingwood in the Victorian Football League (VFL) and South Adelaide, West Torrens, North Adelaide and Sturt in the South Australian Football Association (SAFA).

At age 38 he enlisted to serve in World War I and served until the end of the war.
