= 2002 SANFL Grand Final =

Central District	Sturt
6.9 (45)	13.14 (92)
	1	2	3	4
CD	0.1 (1)	2.4 (16)	5.6 (36)	6.9 (45)
STU	4.6 (30)	8.7 (55)	11.12 (78)	13.14 (92)
- Date: Sunday 6 October 2002
- Stadium: Football Park
- Attendance: 35,187
- Umpires: Dey, Williams, Pfeiffer

The 2002 South Australian National Football League (SANFL) Grand Final saw Sturt defeat and upset the premiership favorites, Central District Bulldogs by 47 points to claim the club's thirteenth premiership victory.

The match was played on Sunday 6 October 2002 at Football Park in front of a crowd of 35,187.
