= 1970 SANFL Grand Final =

Sturt	Glenelg
12.13 (85)	9.10 (64)
	1	2	3	4
STU	1.4 (10)	4.6 (30)	8.10 (58)	12.13 (85)
GLE	3.6 (24)	4.8 (32)	5.10 (40)	9.10 (64)
- Date: Saturday, 26 September
- Stadium: Adelaide Oval
- Attendance: 48,757

The 1970 SANFL Grand Final was an Australian rules football competition. Sturt beat Glenelg by 85 to 64.
