= 1932 SANFL Grand Final =

Sturt	North Adelaide
16.14 (110)	10.9 (69)
	1	2	3	4
STU	4.3 (27)	7.5 (47)	14.11 (95)	16.14 (110)
NA	2.2 (14)	4.8 (32)	4.9 (33)	10.9 (69)
- Date: Saturday, 1 October
- Stadium: Adelaide Oval
- Attendance: 29,717

The 1932 SANFL Grand Final was an Australian rules football competition. Sturt beat North Adelaide 110 to 69.
