= 1966 SANFL Grand Final =

- Official program cover. Depicted is 1966 Magarey Medallist Ron Kneebone of Norwood.

Port Adelaide	Sturt
8.8 (56)	16.16 (112)
	1	2	3	4
PTA	3.2 (20)	5.2 (32)	7.7 (49)	8.8 (56)
STU	3.2 (20)	7.7 (49)	9.12 (66)	16.16 (112)
- Date: Saturday, 1 October (2:10 pm)
- Stadium: Adelaide Oval
- Attendance: 59,417

The 1966 SANFL Grand Final was an Australian rules football competition. Sturt beat Port Adelaide by 112 to 56.

One of the most notable features of this match was the coaching of Jack Oatey who directed his players to utilise the handball as an offensive weapon. Ten minutes into the third quarter Port Adelaide trailed by only 3 points, however after this point Sturt scored nine goals to one. At the end of the game Sturt had used handballs five times more than Port Adelaide with the statistic sheet reading 55–11.
