= 1967 SANFL Grand Final =

- Official program cover. Pictured is 1967 Magarey Medallist Trevor Obst.

Sturt	Port Adelaide
13.10 (88)	10.17 (77)
	1	2	3	4
STU	5.0 (30)	7.6 (48)	9.6 (60)	13.10 (88)
PTA	2.5 (17)	8.9 (57)	9.14 (68)	10.17 (77)
- Date: Saturday, 30 September (2:10 pm)
- Stadium: Adelaide Oval
- Attendance: 58,849

The 1967 SANFL Grand Final was an Australian rules football competition. Sturt beat Port Adelaide by 88 to 77.
