= 1969 SANFL Grand Final =

Sturt	Glenelg
24.15 (159)	13.16 (94)
	1	2	3	4
STU	6.3 (39)	10.7 (67)	16.12 (108)	24.15 (159)
GLE	2.3 (15)	5.10 (40)	8.13 (61)	13.16 (94)
- Date: Saturday, 4 October
- Stadium: Adelaide Oval
- Attendance: 55,600

The 1969 SANFL Grand Final was an Australian rules football competition. Sturt beat Glenelg by 24.15 (159) 159 to 13.16 (94). Sturt's score is still the highest score recorded in a SANFL Grand Final Game. Glenelg registered Richmond player Royce Hart to play in the game, due to Hart undertaking his National Service in Adelaide during the year. Hart was allegedly paid $2,000 for the game, and kicked two goals.
