= 1926 SAFL Grand Final =

Sturt	North Adelaide
9.10 (64)	7.9 (51)
	1	2	3	4
STU	3.2 (20)	4.5 (29)	7.7 (49)	9.10 (64)
NTH	2.3 (15)	3.5 (23)	5.7 (37)	7.9 (51)
- Date: Saturday, 2 October
- Stadium: Adelaide Oval
- Attendance: 30,000

The 1926 SAFL Grand Final was an Australian rules football game contested between the Sturt Football Club and the North Adelaide Football Club, held at the Adelaide Oval in Adelaide on the 26 October 1926.

It was the 28th annual Grand Final of the South Australian Football League, staged to determine the premiers for the 1926 SAFL season. The match, attended by 30,000 spectators, was won by Sturt by 13 points the margin, marking the club's third premiership victory.
