= 1974 SANFL Grand Final =

Sturt	Glenelg
9.16 (70)	8.7 (55)
	1	2	3	4
STU	6.5 (41)	6.6 (42)	6.12 (48)	9.16 (70)
GLE	0.1 (1)	4.6 (30)	6.7 (43)	8.7 (55)
- Date: Saturday, 28 September (2:10 pm)
- Stadium: Football Park
- Attendance: 58,113

The 1974 SANFL Grand Final was an Australian rules football competition. Sturt defeated Glenelg by 15 points.
