= 2014 SANFL Grand Final =

Norwood	Port Adelaide
12.10 (82)	11.12 (78)
	1	2	3	4
NOR	5.1 (31)	7.8 (50)	11.8 (74)	12.10 (82)
PTA	1.3 (9)	6.7 (43)	10.10 (70)	11.12 (78)
- Date: Sunday, 21 September (2:40 pm)
- Stadium: Adelaide Oval
- Attendance: 38,644
- Umpires: Medlin, Crosby, Deboy

Ceremonies
- Pre-match entertainment: The Screaming Jets

Accolades
- Best on Ground: Matthew Panos (Norwood)

Broadcast in Australia
- Network: Seven Network
- Commentators: John Casey, Mark Soderstrom, Tim Ginever

The 2014 South Australian National Football League (SANFL) was an Australian rules football competition. Norwood beat Port Adelaide by 82 to 78.

== Teams ==
Norwood
B:	15 Jace Bode	13 Kieran McGuinness (c)	11 Alex Forster
HB:	2 Kristian Roocke	16 Michael Chippendale	38 Andrew Kirwan
C:	28 Ben Jefferies	4 Matthew Panos	20 Anthony Wilson
HF:	42 Ed Smart	26 Liam Davis	12 Simon Phillips
F:	30 Brady Dawe	3 Michael Newton	37 Josh Donohue
Foll:	18 Sam Baulderstone	23 Tim Webber	6 Callum Bartlett
Int:	17 Kane Murphy	1 Gavin Hughes	7 James Allan
Coach:	Ben Warren		

== Scorecard ==
2014 SANFL Grand Final
Sunday 21 September (2:40 pm)	Norwood	def.	Port Adelaide	Adelaide Oval (crowd: 38,644)	Report
5.1 (31); 7.7 (49); 11.8 (74); 12.10 (82)	Q1; Q2; Q3; Final	1.3 (9); 6.7 (43); 10.10 (70); 11.12 (78)	Umpires: Curtis Deboy, T. Medlin, A. Crosby; Jack Oatey Medallist: Matthew Panos (Norwood); Television broadcast: Seven Network
Phillips, Davis 3 Newton 2 Panos, Bartlett, Baulderstone, Donohue 1	Goals	3 Krakouer; 2 Young, Shaw; 1 Summerton, Hitchcock, Mitchell, Amon
Panos, McGuinness, Baulderstone, Smart, Phillips, Webber, Allan, Kirwan	Best	Summerton, Mitchell, Newton, Krakouer, Clurey, Lewis Stevenson, Gray
Norwood's win was their 30th premiership in the SANFL and their first premiership hat-trick since winning 3 in a row from 1887-89
