= Michael Taylor (Australian footballer) =

Australian rules footballer

Personal information
- Full name: Michael Taylor
- Nickname: Kingo
- Born: 30 December 1953 (age 72)
- Original team: Kingston SE
- Height: 183 cm (6 ft 0 in)
- Weight: 84 kg (185 lb)
- Positions: Defender, centreman

Playing career^{1}
Years	Club	Games (Goals)
1972–80, 1985–87	Norwood	267 (120)
1981–1984	Collingwood	92 (28)
Total		359 (148)

Representative team honours
Years	Team	Games (Goals)
	South Australia	13

Coaching career
Years	Club	Games (W–L–D)
1996–2000	West Adelaide	104 (50–53–1)
- ^{1} Playing statistics correct to the end of 1987.

Career highlights
- 2× SANFL Premiership player: (1975, 1978); 6× Norwood Club Champion: (1973, 1974, 1978, 1979, 1980, 1986); Norwood captain: (1978–1980); South Australian Football Hall of Fame, inducted 2002

Michael S. Taylor (born 30 December 1953) is a former Australian rules footballer who played for the Collingwood Football Club in the Victorian Football League (VFL) and for the Norwood Football Club in the South Australian National Football League (SANFL). He also played 13 interstate games for South Australia in interstate and State of Origin football.

Norwood's Club Champion award, which is given to the Norwood footballer judged best and fairest for the season at senior SANFL level, was renamed in his honour in 2018.

On the 14th of June 2022, Michael was inducted into the AFL Hall of Fame.

== Playing career ==
Taylor came to Norwood as a 15 year old, from the South-East town of Kingston SE. He first played for the Norwood Colts, coached by Mal Smith. In two stints at Norwood, Taylor won six best and fairest awards, a club record he shares with Walter Scott. Five of them were won before he came to Collingwood, where he was a member of a strong Norwood side which won premierships in 1975 and as captain 1978. The 1978 premiership was his first year as captain and he remained in that role until he joined Collingwood in 1981. He had played as both a defender and centreman while at Norwood and he spent most of his time with Collingwood in defence.

Despite playing four seasons at Collingwood he managed 92 games, including the 1981 VFL Grand Final which they lost to Carlton. He returned to Norwood in 1985 before retiring two years later after 267 SANFL premiership games, and 359 premiership games in elite football.

Taylor also played 13 interstate football/State of Origin matches for South Australia and 26 pre-season/night series matches - 22 for Norwood and four for Collingwood (which are counted as senior by the SANFL but not the VFL/AFL). If these are considered, then Taylor played a total of 398 senior career games. The VFL/AFL lists Taylor's total as 394, excluding his pre-season/night series matches for Collingwood.

== Coaching career ==
As a coach Taylor has been in charge of Collingwood's reserves team as well as being an assistant at AFL club Adelaide. In 1996 he became coach of West Adelaide and spent five seasons with the club. His best effort was in 1998 when West Adelaide reached the Preliminary final.

When the South Australian Football Hall of Fame was established in 2002, Taylor was among the inaugural inductees, and was also named as a back pocket in Norwood's official 'Team of the Century'.
