= 1951 SANFL season =

Australian football season

- Teams: 8
- Premiers: Port Adelaide; 14th premiership
- Minor premiers: Port Adelaide; 22nd minor premiership
- Magarey Medallist: John Marriott; Norwood
- Ken Farmer Medallist: Colin Churchett; Glenelg (102 Goals)

Attendance
- Matches played: 76
- Total attendance: 653,105 (8,593 per match)
- Highest: 41,997 (Grand Final, Port Adelaide vs. North Adelaide)

The 1951 South Australian National Football League season was the 72nd season of the top-level Australian rules football competition in South Australia.

== Ladder ==
1951 SANFL Ladder
| Pos | Team | Pld | W | L | D | PF | PA | PP | Pts |
|---|---|---|---|---|---|---|---|---|---|
| 1 | Port Adelaide (P) | 18 | 17 | 1 | 0 | 1584 | 1016 | 60.92 | 34 |
| 2 | North Adelaide | 18 | 13 | 5 | 0 | 1566 | 1146 | 57.74 | 26 |
| 3 | Glenelg | 18 | 12 | 6 | 0 | 1709 | 1435 | 54.36 | 24 |
| 4 | West Torrens | 18 | 10 | 8 | 0 | 1514 | 1321 | 53.40 | 20 |
| 5 | Norwood | 18 | 9 | 9 | 0 | 1370 | 1240 | 52.49 | 18 |
| 6 | West Adelaide | 18 | 8 | 10 | 0 | 1180 | 1336 | 46.90 | 16 |
| 7 | Sturt | 18 | 2 | 16 | 0 | 1169 | 1780 | 39.64 | 4 |
| 8 | South Adelaide | 18 | 1 | 17 | 0 | 1120 | 1938 | 36.63 | 2 |

Rules for classification: 1) points; 2) percentage; 3) number of points for.
(P) Premiers

== Finals Series ==
=== Grand Final ===
1951 SANFL Grand Final
Saturday 29 September (2:10 pm) | Port Adelaide | def. | North Adelaide | Adelaide Oval (crowd: 41,997) | Report
6.4 (40); 8.5 (53); 9.9 (63); 10.12 (72) | Q1; Q2; Q3; Final | 2.1 (13); 4.6 (30); 4.9 (33); 8.13 (61)
