= Harry Ralph =

Australian rules footballer, born 1919

Personal information
- Full name: Harry Edward Ralph
- Born: 21 May 1919; Minnipa, South Australia
- Died: 17 July 2004 (aged 85)
- Original team: North Adelaide colts/reserves
- Height: 174 cm (5 ft 9 in)
- Weight: 80 kg (176 lb)
- Position: Half-back flank

Playing career^{1}
Years	Club	Games (Goals)
1939–41, 1944–46	Norwood	28 (4)
1945	Essendon	4 (0)

Representative team honours^{2}
Years	Team	Games (Goals)
1945	South Australia	1 (0)
- ^{1} Playing statistics correct to the end of 1946.^{2} Representative statistics correct as of 1945.

Harry Edward Ralph (21 May 1919 – 17 July 2004) was an Australian rules footballer who played with Essendon in the Victorian Football League (VFL) and in the South Australian National Football League (SANFL).

Ralph's career with Norwood was interrupted by his service in the Australian Army and then the Royal Australian Air Force during World War II. It was while serving in Melbourne with the RAAF that Ralph played four games for Essendon.

Ralph's last senior game for Norwood was their 1946 Grand Final victory over Port Adelaide, though he continued playing in the club's reserves until 1949. He later played for Cleve and coached various country football clubs, including Kingscote, Burra, Quorn, Orroroo and Bute.

Ralph worked as a manager for the State Bank of South Australia, retiring in 1980.
