= 1923 SAFL Grand Final =

Norwood	North Adelaide
9.12 (66)	6.4 (40)
	1	2	3	4
NOR	4.3 (27)	6.8 (44)	7.9 (51)	9.12 (66)
NTH	2.1 (13)	4.1 (25)	5.2 (32)	6.4 (40)
- Date: Saturday, 29 September
- Stadium: Adelaide Oval
- Attendance: 37,000

The 1923 SAFL Grand Final was an Australian rules football game contested between the Norwood Football Club and the North Adelaide Football Club, held at the Adelaide Oval in Adelaide on the 29 September 1922.

It was the 25th annual Grand Final of the South Australian Football League, staged to determine the premiers for the 1923 SAFL season. The match, attended by 31,000 spectators, was won by Norwood by a margin of 26 points, marking the clubs sixteenth premiership victory.
