= Alby Bahr =

Australian rules footballer

Personal information
- Full name: John Albert Bahr
- Born: 30 September 1881; Yanyarrie, South Australia
- Died: 14 November 1962 (aged 81); Magill, South Australia

Playing career^{1}
Years	Club	Games (Goals)
1902-1912	Norwood	132 (49)
Total		132 (49)

Representative team honours
Years	Team	Games (Goals)
1905-1912	South Australia	8 (0)

Coaching career^{3}
Years	Club	Games (W–L–D)
1907-1908, 1911-1912	Norwood	48 (29–18–1)
- ^{1} Playing statistics correct to the end of 1912.^{3} Coaching statistics correct as of 1912.

Career highlights
- 4x Norwood premiership player 1904, 1905, 1906, 1907; Norwood premiership captain-coach 1907; Norwood Captain 1907-1910, 1912; South Australia Captain (1908 Melbourne Carnival); 2x Norwood Best and Fairest 1904, 1908; Norwood Team of the Century (Back Pocket); South Australian Football Hall of Fame inaugural inductee 2002; Norwood Hall of Fame inductee; Norwood Player Life Member

Alby Bahr (30 September 1881 – 14 November 1962) was an Australian rules footballer who played for Norwood Football Club in the South Australian Football Association/League (SAFA/SAFL). Considered one of Norwood's finest players of the early 1900s, Bahr was recognised beyond his club by being appointed state captain in 1908 for South Australia for the inaugural interstate carnival held in Melbourne. Bahr has been recognised posthumously as a significant player, being named in the Back Pocket in Norwood's Team of the Century and being inducted into the Norwood and South Australian Halls of Fame.
