= 1936 SANFL season =

- Teams: 8
- Premiers: Port Adelaide; 11th premiership
- Minor premiers: Port Adelaide; 18th minor premiership
- Magarey Medallist: Bill McCallum; Norwood (31 votes)
- Ken Farmer Medallist: Ken Farmer; North Adelaide (134 Goals)
- Matches played: 72
- Highest: 35,120 (Grand Final, Port Adelaide vs. Sturt)

The 1936 South Australian National Football League season was the 57th season of the top-level Australian rules football competition in South Australia.

== Ladder ==
1936 SANFL Ladder
Pos	Team	Pld	W	L	D	PF	PA	PP	Pts
1	Port Adelaide (P)	17	14	3	0	2186	1722	55.94	28
2	Sturt	17	12	5	0	1950	1659	54.03	24
3	South Adelaide	17	11	6	0	1894	1495	55.89	22
4	North Adelaide	17	10	7	0	1979	1715	53.57	20
5	Norwood	17	10	7	0	1882	1657	53.18	20
6	West Torrens	17	5	12	0	1666	1794	48.15	10
7	Glenelg	17	4	13	0	1703	2220	43.41	8
8	West Adelaide	17	2	15	0	1163	2161	34.99	4

Rules for classification: 1) points; 2) percentage; 3) number of points for.
(P) Premiers

== Finals series ==
=== Grand Final ===
1936 SANFL Grand Final
Saturday, 3 October	Port Adelaide	def.	Sturt	Adelaide Oval (crowd: 35,120)
2.2 (14); 6.8 (44); 10.16 (76); 13.19 (97)	Q1; Q2; Q3; Final	6.3 (39); 11.6 (72); 12.8 (80); 14.10 (94)
