= 1925 SAFL Grand Final =

Norwood	West Torrens
8.4 (52)	7.9 (51)
	1	2	3	4
NOR	2.0 (12)	5.4 (34)	5.4 (34)	8.4 (52)
WT	1.3 (9)	1.4 (10)	3.6 (24)	7.9 (51)
- Date: Saturday, 26 September
- Stadium: Adelaide Oval
- Attendance: 37,750

The 1925 SAFL Grand Final was an Australian rules football game contested between the Norwood Football Club and the West Torrens Football Club, held at the Adelaide Oval in Adelaide on the 26 September 1925.

It was the 27th annual Grand Final of the South Australian Football League, staged to determine the premiers for the 1925 SAFL season. The match, attended by 37,750 spectators, was won by Norwood by 1 point, marking the club's seventeenth premiership victory.
