= 1946 SANFL season =

- Teams: 8
- Premiers: Norwood; 20th premiership
- Minor premiers: Norwood; 11th minor premiership
- Magarey Medallist: Bob Hank; West Torrens
- Ken Farmer Medallist: Peter Dalwood; Norwood (70 Goals)
- Matches played: 72
- Highest: 53,473 (Grand Final, Norwood vs. Port Adelaide)

The 1946 South Australian National Football League season was the 67th season of the top-level Australian rules football competition in South Australia.

== Ladder ==
1946 SANFL Ladder
Pos	Team	Pld	W	L	D	PF	PA	PP	Pts
1	Norwood (P)	17	14	3	0	1855	1345	57.97	28
2	Port Adelaide	17	12	5	0	1660	1370	54.79	24
3	West Adelaide	17	11	6	0	1739	1446	54.60	22
4	Sturt	17	10	7	0	1569	1391	53.01	20
5	West Torrens	17	9	8	0	1537	1435	51.72	18
6	North Adelaide	17	6	11	0	1362	1654	45.16	12
7	South Adelaide	17	5	12	0	1359	1888	41.85	10
8	Glenelg	17	1	16	0	1244	1796	40.92	2

Rules for classification: 1) points; 2) percentage; 3) number of points for.
(P) Premiers

== Finals series ==
=== Grand Final ===
1946 SANFL Grand Final
Saturday, 5 October (12:00am)	Norwood	def.	Port Adelaide	Adelaide Oval (crowd: 53,473)
4.5 (29); 6.9 (45); 9.10 (64); 13.14 (92)	Q1; Q2; Q3; Final	0.4 (4); 2.7 (19); 4.10 (34); 9.10 (64)
