= 1966 SANFL season =

- Teams: 10
- Premiers: Sturt; 6th premiership
- Minor premiers: Sturt; 5th minor premiership
- Magarey Medallist: Ron Kneebone; Norwood
- Ken Farmer Medallist: Eric Freeman; Port Adelaide (81 Goals)

Attendance
- Matches played: 104
- Total attendance: 1,017,191 (9,781 per match)
- Highest: 59,417 (Grand Final, Sturt vs. Port Adelaide)

The 1966 South Australian National Football League season was the 87th season of the top-level Australian rules football competition in South Australia.

== Ladder ==
1966 SANFL Ladder
Pos	Team	Pld	W	L	D	PF	PA	PP	Pts
1	Sturt (P)	20	18	2	0	2247	1443	60.89	36
2	Port Adelaide	20	14	6	0	1813	1267	58.86	28
3	South Adelaide	20	14	6	0	1966	1382	58.72	28
4	North Adelaide	20	13	7	0	1595	1579	50.25	26
5	West Torrens	20	10	9	1	1707	1572	52.06	21
6	West Adelaide	20	10	10	0	1628	1710	48.77	20
7	Norwood	20	9	11	0	1629	1792	47.62	18
8	Woodville	20	4	15	1	1393	1958	41.57	9
9	Central District	20	4	16	0	1325	1870	41.47	8
10	Glenelg	20	3	17	0	1340	2070	39.30	6

Rules for classification: 1) points; 2) percentage; 3) number of points for.
(P) Premiers

== Finals Series ==
=== Grand Final ===
1966 SANFL Grand Final
Saturday, 1 October (2:10 pm)	Port Adelaide	def. by	Sturt	Adelaide Oval (crowd: 59,417)
3.2 (20); 5.2 (32); 7.7 (49); 8.8 (56)	Q1; Q2; Q3; Final	3.2 (20); 7.7 (49); 9.12 (66); 16.16 (112)
