= 1925 SAFL season =

1925 season of SANFL

1925 SAFL premiership season
- Teams: 8
- Premiers: Norwood; 17th premiership
- Minor premiers: Norwood; 7th minor premiership
- Magarey Medallist: Alick Lill; Norwood (34 votes); Peter Bampton (Note: Awarded retrospectively and posthumously); Port Adelaide (34 votes)
- Leading goalkicker: Roy Bent; Norwood (59 goals)
- Matches played: 59
- Highest: 37,750 (Grand Final, Norwood vs. West Torrens)

The 1925 South Australian Football League season was the 46th season of the top-level Australian rules football competition in South Australia. It is best-known for Glenelg's first league win after league record 56 consecutive losses. The Bays, helped by the clearance of South Adelaide star Jim Handby after a dispute throughout 1924. begun with a sensational win over 1924 premiers West Torrens, who early in the season were severely affected by the ban on the "flick pass", but hindered by a succession of injuries won only one further game. South Adelaide, hindered by the loss of training ground Jubilee Oval, fell from nine wins to four and begun a decade with just 30 wins and three draws over 164 games. The same four clubs played in the finals as in 1924, but this time Norwood managed their third premiership without a challenge match in four seasons.

== Minor round ==
=== Round 1 ===
	Round 1
Saturday, 2 May 1925	West Adelaide 5.9 (39)	def. by	Norwood 17.11 (113)	Adelaide Oval (crowd: 12,700)
Saturday, 2 May 1925	Glenelg 12.6 (78)	def.	West Torrens 10.10 (70)	Glenelg Oval (crowd: 5,060)
Saturday, 2 May 1925	North Adelaide 11.10 (76)	def.	South Adelaide 10.5 (65)	Prospect Oval (crowd: 4,800)
Saturday, 2 May 1925	Sturt 11.11 (77)	def.	Port Adelaide 10.7 (67)	Unley Oval (crowd: 10,000)
After 56 consecutive losses – a record in any of the major Australian rules leagues – Glenelg win its first game in astonishing fashion against the reigning premiers

=== Round 2 ===
	Round 2
Saturday, 9 May 1925	South Adelaide 12.8 (80)	def.	West Torrens 8.16 (64)	Adelaide Oval
Saturday, 9 May 1925	Port Adelaide 11.10 (76)	def.	Glenelg 10.6 (66)	Alberton Oval
Saturday, 9 May 1925	Norwood 13.12 (90)	def.	Sturt 10.7 (67)	Norwood Oval
Saturday, 9 May 1925	North Adelaide 3.7 (25)	def. by	West Adelaide 6.6 (42)	Prospect Oval

=== Round 3 ===
	Round 3
Saturday, 16 May 1925	South Adelaide 10.9 (69)	def.	Sturt 7.9 (51)	Adelaide Oval (crowd: 12,000)
Saturday, 16 May 1925	Port Adelaide 11.8 (74)	def. by	West Torrens 14.9 (93)	Alberton Oval (crowd: 10,000)
Saturday, 16 May 1925	Glenelg 6.11 (47)	def. by	West Adelaide 17.10 (112)	Glenelg Oval (crowd: 3,100)
Saturday, 16 May 1925	Norwood 15.13 (103)	def.	North Adelaide 8.18 (66)	Norwood Oval (crowd: 8,500)
Reigning premier Torrens, the only winless club after two rounds, rebound at Alberton by leading all day

=== Round 4 ===
	Round 4
Saturday, 23 May 1925	West Adelaide 9.15 (69)	def.	Sturt 10.6 (66)	Adelaide Oval (crowd: 12,500)
Saturday, 23 May 1925	Port Adelaide 16.16 (112)	def.	South Adelaide 10.5 (65)	Alberton Oval (crowd: 7,000)
Saturday, 23 May 1925	Norwood 10.21 (81)	def.	Glenelg 5.10 (40)	Norwood Oval (crowd: 7,500)
Saturday, 23 May 1925	West Torrens 13.15 (93)	def.	North Adelaide 10.11 (71)	Thebarton Oval (crowd: 8,127)

=== Round 5 ===
	Round 5
Saturday, 30 May 1925	West Adelaide 4.16 (40)	def.	Port Adelaide 5.6 (36)	Adelaide Oval (crowd: 11,500)
Saturday, 30 May 1925	Glenelg 14.8 (92)	def.	South Adelaide 10.9 (69)	Glenelg Oval (crowd: 2,030)
Saturday, 30 May 1925	West Torrens 12.16 (88)	def.	Norwood 9.9 (63)	Thebarton Oval (crowd: 11,750)
Saturday, 30 May 1925	Sturt 15.12 (102)	def.	North Adelaide 9.11 (65)	Unley Oval (crowd: 3,500)
Torrens end Norwood's unbeaten run and move back to third as the Redlegs are left a man short (Note: Until 1930 teams were not allowed any reserves to replace a man injured, and had to play a man short if a player was incapacitated.) by an injury to key defender Stephens.

=== Round 6 ===
	Round 6
Saturday, 6 June 1925	West Adelaide 6.8 (44)	def. by	West Torrens 13.10 (88)	Adelaide Oval
Saturday, 6 June 1925	Sturt 16.11 (107)	def.	Glenelg 10.10 (70)	Unley Oval
Monday, 8 June 1925	South Adelaide 8.11 (59)	def. by	Norwood 12.18 (90)	Adelaide Oval
Monday, 8 June 1925	Port Adelaide 10.11 (71)	def.	North Adelaide 9.12 (66)	Alberton Oval

=== Round 7 ===
	Round 7
Saturday, 13 June 1925	South Adelaide 11.13 (79)	def.	West Adelaide 11.11 (77)	Adelaide Oval (crowd: 6,300)
Saturday, 13 June 1925	Port Adelaide 11.14 (80)	def.	Norwood 10.10 (70)	Alberton Oval (crowd: 10,600)
Saturday, 13 June 1925	North Adelaide 11.16 (82)	def.	Glenelg 7.11 (53)	Prospect Oval (crowd: 3,324)
Saturday, 13 June 1925	Sturt 15.10 (100)	def.	West Torrens 6.16 (52)	Unley Oval (crowd: 11,500)
"Bulla" Ryan's career-high nine goals gives South Adelaide a thrilling victory and places him eight goals ahead on the league goalkicking.

=== Round 8 ===
	Round 8
Saturday, 27 June 1925	South Adelaide 6.13 (49)	def. by	North Adelaide 10.16 (76)	Adelaide Oval
Saturday, 27 June 1925	Port Adelaide 12.9 (81)	def.	Sturt 11.9 (75)	Alberton Oval (crowd: 9,400)
Saturday, 27 June 1925	Norwood 9.15 (69)	def.	West Adelaide 8.8 (56)	Norwood Oval
Saturday, 27 June 1925	West Torrens 12.16 (88)	def.	Glenelg 8.11 (59)	Thebarton Oval

=== Round 9 ===
	Round
Saturday, 11 July 1925	West Adelaide 7.10 (52)	def.	Norwood 8.3 (51)	Adelaide Oval
Saturday, 11 July 1925	Glenelg 7.5 (47)	def. by	Port Adelaide 17.13 (115)	Glenelg Oval
Saturday, 11 July 1925	West Torrens 16.10 (106)	def.	South Adelaide 13.4 (82)	Thebarton Oval
Saturday, 11 July 1925	Sturt 5.14 (44)	def.	Norwood 6.6 (42)	Unley Oval
Glenelg play most of the game with only fifteen men due to injuries to former North Adelaide player Fuss, Hill and Torpy. Logan kicks eleven for the Magpies.

=== Round 10 ===
	Round 10
Saturday, 18 July 1925	West Adelaide 13.10 (88)	def.	Glenelg 6.14 (50)	Adelaide Oval
Saturday, 18 July 1925	North Adelaide 9.12 (66)	def. by	North Adelaide 9.13 (67)	Prospect Oval
Saturday, 18 July 1925	West Torrens 7.15 (57)	def. by	Port Adelaide 11.10 (76)	Thebarton Oval
Saturday, 18 July 1925	Sturt 10.10 (70)	def.	South Adelaide 6.10 (46)	Unley Oval

=== Round 11 ===
	Round 11
Saturday, 25 July 1925	Glenelg 3.11 (29)	def. by	Sturt 16.13 (109)	Glenelg Oval
Saturday, 25 July 1925	Norwood 18.20 (128)	def.	South Adelaide 7.16 (58)	Norwood Oval
Saturday, 25 July 1925	North Adelaide 6.6 (42)	def. by	Port Adelaide 8.13 (61)	Prospect Oval
Saturday, 25 July 1925	West Torrens 11.15 (81)	def.	West Adelaide 9.7 (61)	Thebarton Oval

=== Round 12 ===
	Round 12
Thursday, 6 August 1925	South Adelaide 8.10 (58)	def. by	Port Adelaide 10.10 (70)	Adelaide Oval
Thursday, 6 August 1925	Glenelg 7.9 (51)	def. by	Norwood 16.12 (108)	Glenelg Oval
Thursday, 6 August 1925	North Adelaide 14.9 (93)	def.	West Torrens 11.9 (75)	Prospect Oval
Thursday, 6 August 1925	Sturt 9.6 (60)	def.	West Adelaide 7.7 (49)	Unley Oval

=== Round 13 ===
	Round 13
Saturday, 22 August 1925	South Adelaide 7.13 (55)	def.	Glenelg 4.12 (36)	Adelaide Oval
Saturday, 22 August 1925	Port Adelaide 8.10 (58)	def.	West Adelaide 8.9 (57)	Alberton Oval
Saturday, 22 August 1925	Norwood 13.16 (94)	def.	West Torrens 5.12 (42)	Norwood Oval
Saturday, 22 August 1925	North Adelaide 10.15 (75)	def.	Sturt 10.10 (70)	Prospect Oval

=== Round 14 ===
	Round 14
Saturday, 5 September 1925	South Adelaide 7.7 (49)	def. by	West Adelaide 15.13 (103)	Adelaide Oval (crowd: 3,800)
Saturday, 5 September 1925	Glenelg 12.6 (78)	def. by	North Adelaide 14.11 (95)	Glenelg Oval (crowd: 920)
Saturday, 5 September 1925	Norwood 12.13 (85)	def.	Port Adelaide 8.8 (56)	Norwood Oval (crowd: 19,600)
Saturday, 5 September 1925	West Torrens 11.15 (81)	def.	Sturt 11.11 (77)	Thebarton Oval (crowd: 6,400)
In a direct playoff for the minor premiership in front of a huge crowd, Norwood take advantage of the absence of Les Dayman and use vigour to overcome the Magpies.

== Ladder ==
1925 SAFL Ladder
Pos	Team	Pld	W	L	D	PF	PA	PP	Pts
1	Norwood (P)	14	11	3	0	1203	812	59.70	22
2	Port Adelaide	14	10	4	0	1033	898	53.50	20
3	Sturt	14	8	6	0	1075	885	54.85	16
4	West Torrens	14	8	6	0	1078	1052	50.61	16
5	West Adelaide	14	7	7	0	889	872	50.48	14
6	North Adelaide	14	6	8	0	949	981	49.17	12
7	South Adelaide	14	4	10	0	883	1151	43.41	8
8	Glenelg	14	2	12	0	796	1255	38.81	4

Rules for classification: 1) points; 2) percentage; 3) number of points for.
(P) Premiers

== Major Round ==
=== First Semi-Final ===
	1925 SAFL First semi-final
Saturday, 12 September	Norwood 10.11 (71)	def.	Sturt 9.10 (64)	Adelaide Oval (crowd: 28,060)
After apparently having the game secured early in the final quarter, Sturt collapse as they fail to cope with Norwood's desperation.

=== Second Semi-Final ===
	1925 SAFL Second Semi-Final
Saturday, 19 September	Port Adelaide 7.11 (53)	def. by	West Torrens 8.12 (60)	Adelaide Oval (crowd: 35,500)

=== Grand Final ===
1925 SAFL Final (Note: This is usually referred to as the "Grand Final", although the winner possessed a right to challenge if defeated)
Saturday 26 September	Norwood	def.	West Torrens	Adelaide Oval (crowd: 37,750)
2.0 (12); 5.4 (34); 5.4 (34); 8.4 (52)	Q1; Q2; Q3; Final	1.3 (9); 1.4 (10); 3.6 (24); 7.9 (51)	Umpires: Quinn
Bent 6, Close, Mutton	Goals	Minnear 2, Marvell 2, Mills 2, Read
Bent, Symonds, Scott, Potts, Ackland, Stephens, Wadham, Mutton	Best	Fleet, Brown, Hine, O'Malley, Karney, Mills, McCarthy, O'Grady
A brilliant long snap by Roy Bent gives Norwood a very late victory after Torrens, trailing for most of the game, made a determined last-quarter bid to force a challenge final
