= 1941 SANFL season =

- Teams: 8
- Premiers: Norwood; 19th premiership
- Minor premiers: Norwood; 10th minor premiership
- Magarey Medallist: Marcus Boyall; Glenelg (25 votes)
- Ken Farmer Medallist: Bruce Schultz; Norwood (100 Goals)
- Matches played: 72
- Highest: 30,742 (Grand Final, Norwood vs. Sturt)

The 1941 South Australian National Football League season was the 62nd season of the top-level Australian rules football competition in South Australia.

== Ladder ==
1941 SANFL Ladder
Pos	Team	Pld	W	L	D	PF	PA	PP	Pts
1	Norwood (P)	17	13	4	0	2112	1525	58.07	26
2	Sturt	17	12	5	0	1649	1452	53.18	24
3	West Adelaide	17	11	5	1	1944	1606	54.76	23
4	Port Adelaide	17	11	5	1	1825	1722	51.45	23
5	South Adelaide	17	6	11	0	1771	1888	48.40	12
6	Glenelg	17	5	12	0	1711	1847	48.09	10
7	North Adelaide	17	5	12	0	1553	2024	43.42	10
8	West Torrens	17	4	13	0	1343	1844	42.14	8

Rules for classification: 1) points; 2) percentage; 3) number of points for.
(P) Premiers

== Finals series ==
=== Grand Final ===
1941 SANFL Grand Final
Saturday, 4 October	Norwood	def.	Sturt	Adelaide Oval (crowd: 30,742)
6.2 (38); 7.8 (50); 11.10 (76); 14.16 (100)	Q1; Q2; Q3; Final	2.3 (15); 2.8 (20); 5.9 (39); 10.11 (71)
