= 1941 SANFL Grand Final =

Norwood	Sturt
14.16 (100)	10.11 (71)
	1	2	3	4
NOR	6.2 (38)	7.8 (50)	11.10 (76)	14.16 (100)
STU	2.3 (15)	2.8 (20)	5.9 (39)	10.11 (71)
- Date: Saturday, 4 October
- Stadium: Adelaide Oval
- Attendance: 30,742

The 1941 SANFL Grand Final was an Australian rules football competition. Norwood beat Sturt 100 to 71.
