= Art Gilchrist =

Australian rules footballer

Personal information
- Full name: Arthur Alexander Gilchrist
- Born: 29 August 1879; South Melbourne, Victoria
- Died: 27 June 1947 (aged 67); Chatswood, New South Wales
- Original team: Norwood
- Height: 175 cm (5 ft 9 in)

Playing career^{1}
Years	Club	Games (Goals)
1905	Melbourne	2 (0)
- ^{1} Playing statistics correct to the end of 1905.

Arthur Alexander Gilchrist (29 August 1879 – 27 June 1947) was a soccer player who played for the Melbourne Football Club in the Victorian Football League (VFL).
