= 1948 SANFL season =

- Teams: 8
- Premiers: Norwood; 21st premiership
- Minor premiers: Norwood; 13th minor premiership
- Magarey Medallist: Ron Phillips; North Adelaide
- Ken Farmer Medallist: Colin Churchett; Glenelg (88 Goals)

Attendance
- Matches played: 72
- Total attendance: 598,902 (8,318 per match)
- Highest: 48,755 (Grand Final, Norwood vs. West Torrens)

The 1948 South Australian National Football League season was the 69th season of the top-level Australian rules football competition in South Australia.

== Ladder ==
1948 SANFL Ladder
Pos	Team	Pld	W	L	D	PF	PA	PP	Pts
1	Norwood (P)	17	14	3	0	1762	1343	56.75	28
2	West Torrens	17	13	4	0	1814	1463	55.36	26
3	West Adelaide	17	11	6	0	1867	1644	53.18	22
4	Sturt	17	10	7	0	1516	1363	52.66	20
5	North Adelaide	17	8	9	0	1588	1395	53.23	16
6	Glenelg	17	8	9	0	1622	1734	48.33	16
7	Port Adelaide	17	4	13	0	1364	1581	46.32	8
8	South Adelaide	17	0	17	0	1201	2211	35.20	0

Rules for classification: 1) points; 2) percentage; 3) number of points for.
(P) Premiers

== Finals series ==
=== Grand Final ===
1948 SANFL Grand Final
Saturday, 2 October	Norwood	def.	West Torrens	Adelaide Oval (crowd: 48,755)
5.4 (34); 5.6 (36); 9.14 (68); 15.16 (106)	Q1; Q2; Q3; Final	1.4 (10); 3.9 (27); 4.9 (33); 6.13 (49)
