= Jim West (footballer) =

Australian rules footballer, born 1966

Personal information
- Full name: Jim West
- Born: 12 April 1966 (age 60)
- Original team: Glenelg
- Draft: No. 50, 1988 national draft
- Height: 190 cm (6 ft 3 in)
- Weight: 90 kg (198 lb)
- Position: Full-Forward

Playing career^{1}
Years	Club	Games (Goals)
1990–92	Sydney Swans	37 (54)
- ^{1} Playing statistics correct to the end of 1999.

Career highlights
- 1990 Sydney Leading Goal kicker (34 goals)

Jim West (born 12 April 1966) is a former Australian rules footballer, playing with the Sydney Swans from 1990 to 1992.

Recruited from Glenelg Football Club in the South Australian National Football League (SANFL), West never really establishing himself in the lineup, only managing 37 games (and kicking 54 goals).

The highlight of his career came in his debut season of 1990, when he topped the Sydney Swans' goal kicking with 34 goals. This was an unsuccessful season for the Swans, where they finished second last and struggled to kick goals all year.

West returned to the SANFL where he played with the Norwood Football Club in their 1997 Premiership team.

West also played and coached at the Encounter Bay Football Club from 1999 to 2004.
