= 1888 Championship of Australia =

1888 Championship of Australia (Game 3)
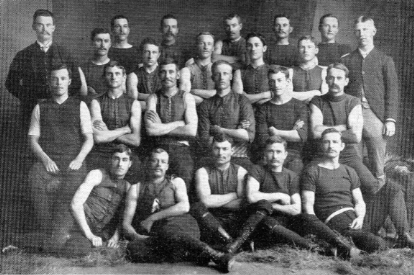

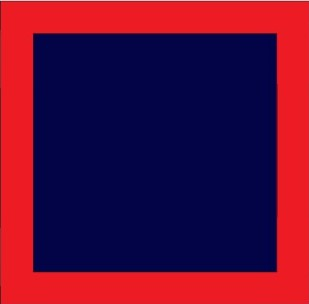

| Norwood | South Melbourne |
|---|---|
| 6.4 | 4.15 |
| | 1 | 2 | 3 | 4 |
|---|---|---|---|---|
| NOR | 1.1 | 3.1 | 5.3 | 6.4 |
| NMB | 1.4 | 2.7 | 4.12 | 4.15 |
- Date: 13 October 1888
- Stadium: Kensington Oval
- Attendance: 2,000

The 1888 Championship of Australia was an Australian rules football series held in Adelaide between 6 October and 13 October 1888.

The championship was contested by the premiers of the VFA, South Melbourne and the premiers of the SAFA, Norwood.

All matches were played at Kensington Oval in Adelaide, South Australia.

The series was won by Norwood 3 games to zero, giving Norwood its 1st Championship of Australia Title.

This was the first Championship of Australia held, but the only one to be held as a series, with subsequent editions held as a single championship match.

== Matches ==
Championship of Australia Game 1
6 October 1888 | Norwood | def. | South Melbourne | Kensington Oval (crowd: 1,000)
4.3; 4.5; 6.6; 8.12 | Q1; Q2; Q3; Final | 1.1; 3.8; 3.8; 4.10

Championship of Australia Game 2
10 October 1888 | Norwood | def. | South Melbourne | Kensington Oval (crowd: 3,000)
1.1; 2.2; 3.5; 6.8 | Q1; Q2; Q3; Final | 1.5; 1.8; 2.9; 2.11 | Umpires: Kennedy

Championship of Australia Game 3
13 October 1888 | Norwood | def. | South Melbourne | Kensington Oval (crowd: 2,000)
1.0; 3.1; 5.3; 6.4 | Q1; Q2; Q3; Final | 1.4; 2.7; 4.12; 4.15
