= Cameron Shenton =

Australian rules footballer

Personal information
- Full name: Cameron Shenton
- Born: 27 September 1990 (age 36)
- Original team: Norwood (SANFL)
- Draft: No. 30, 2012 rookie draft
- Height: 188 cm (6 ft 2 in)
- Weight: 83 kg (183 lb)
- Position: Defense

Playing career^{1}
Years	Club	Games (Goals)
2013–2016	St Kilda	24 (8)
- ^{1} Playing statistics correct to the end of 2016.

Cameron Shenton (born 27 September 1990) is a former professional Australian rules footballer who played for the St Kilda Football Club in the Australian Football League (AFL).

== AFL career ==
Shenton was recruited by the club in the 2012 Rookie draft, with pick No. 30. He made his debut in Round 22, 2013, against Gold Coast at Docklands Stadium.

Shenton was elevated to St Kilda's primary list as a rookie elevation in the 2014 AFL draft. He regained his spot in the senior side in Round 8, 2014 for the clash against Carlton, playing 10 games in 2014 and 13 in 2015.

Playing as a St Kilda listed player with Victorian Football League affiliate team the Sandringham Zebras in 2016, Shenton was voted the best and fairest player, winning the Neil Bencraft Award with 110 votes after a 41-goal season from 18 matches. At the conclusion of the 2016 season, he was delisted by St Kilda.

In 2017 he returned to the SANFL and became part of Norwood's 2018 Grand Final team. Since then he has won a number of accolades, including 2x Woods Medalist and in 2021 he won the club's Leading Goal Kicker award. At the end of the 2021 season, he announced his retirement from the SANFL. Shenton decided to return to Golden Grove where all his football magic begun.
