= Norwood Football Club =

Australian rules football club

Names
- Full name: Norwood Football Club
- Nickname: Redlegs
- Motto: Fortis in Procella (Strength in Adversity.)

2026 season
- After finals: 1st
- Home-and-away season: 1st
- Leading goalkicker: Tristan Binder
- Best and fairest: Nik Rokahr

Club details
- Founded: 28 February 1878; 148 years ago
- Colours: Navy blue, red
- Competition: South Australian National Football League
- CEO: James Fantasia
- Coach: Jade Sheedy
- Captain: Jacob Kennerley
- Premierships: SANFL (32): 1878, 1879, 1880, 1881, 1882, 1883, 1887, 1888, 1889, 1891, 1894, 1901, 1904, 1907, 1922, 1923, 1925, 1929, 1941, 1946, 1948, 1950, 1975, 1978, 1982, 1984, 1997, 2012, 2013, 2014, 2022, 2026 SANFLW (1): 2017; Championship of Australia (2): 1888, 1907; NFL Championship Series (1): 1977 WWII Patriotic League (2): 1943, 1944 (as Norwood-North Adelaide)
- Ground: Coopers Stadium (capacity: 10,000)

Uniforms
Home

Other information
- Official website: norwoodfc.com.au

The Norwood Football Club, nicknamed the Redlegs, is an Australian rules football club competing in the South Australian National Football League (SANFL). Its home ground is Coopers Stadium (Norwood Oval), which is often referred to as "The Parade". It is one of the two traditional powerhouse clubs of the SANFL, the other being Port Adelaide, who together have won half of all SANFL premierships (see Port Adelaide–Norwood SANFL rivalry). The club has won 32 SANFL premierships and 1 SANFLW premiership. They are the current 2026 SANFL Premiers.

== History ==
=== 1878–1899: Nineteenth-century powerhouse ===
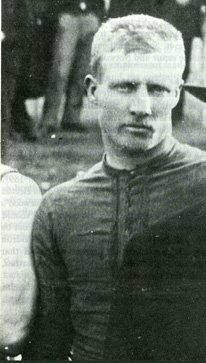
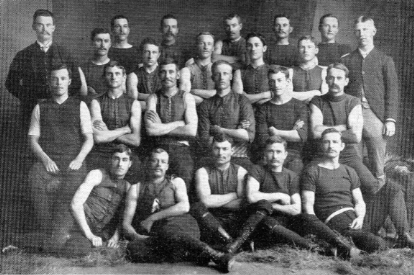
Left: Alfred "Topsy" Waldron was South Australia's first football celebrity. Poached from Carlton after the 1878 VFA season, he would go on to win nine premierships with Norwood, captaining the club to its inaugural national title.
Right: Norwood's victorious 1888 Championship of Australia team.

1888 Champions of Australia	Wins	Losses	Total
Norwood	3	0	3
South Melbourne	0	3	0
Venue: Kensington Oval, Adelaide

The Norwood Football Club was formed at a meeting held at the Norfolk Arms Hotel in Rundle Street, Adelaide on 28 February 1878: it was resolved that the club colours would be those of the old Woodville Club. At a subsequent meeting with 12 members present at the Norfolk Arms Hotel on 14 March the colours were confirmed as blue guernseys and knickerbockers, and red stockings and cap. The new club gained a number of leading players from the then recently dissolved Woodville Football Club (1868–1877), including its Captain J.R. (Joe) Osborn who would become Norwood's inaugural Captain.

Norwood's first home ground was the current CBC College oval in the east Park Lands near the tramway and opposite the Kent Town Brewery.

Norwood played their first SAFA match against South Adelaide at Adelaide Oval on 16 May 1878, who were the current reigning premiers from the inaugural season: Norwood went on to win the match 1 goal to nil, with future Australian Test cricketer and Captain George Giffen kicking Norwood's goal from a running kick. During this match the players donned distinctive red stockings which gave rise to the nickname 'Redlegs', the moniker which has remained synonymous with Norwood ever since.

1889 SAFA Premiership Playoff; Australia's First Grand Final.	G	B	Total
Norwood	7	4	7
Port Adelaide	5	9	5
Venue: Adelaide Oval	Crowd: 10,000

Norwood won a premiership in its first year of existence and then followed with five more in a row. Only Port Adelaide in 1954–1959 has managed to repeat the feat of winning six premierships in a row. Norwood eventually won 11 pennants between 1878 and 1899 and was the most successful team of the 19th century. In 1883, after winning the pennant for the sixth successive year, Norwood became the first South Australian club to record a win over a Victorian team, when it defeated Essendon. In 1888, Norwood were proclaimed 'Premiers of Australia' when they defeated South Melbourne in three matches at Kensington Oval.

Norwood and Port Adelaide became famous rivals after a particularly tough match in 1894.

Early champions of the club include Alfred 'Topsy' Waldron, who captained the club for nine years; Alby Green, the first player to win the Magarey Medal for the best and fairest player in the competition in 1898; and Anthony 'Bos' Daly, who kicked 88 goals in 1893, including an astonishing 23 goals in one match. Daly's goal tally would not be surpassed for another 37 years, and his tally of 23 goals in one match has only ever been equalled by the great North Adelaide full forward goal kicker Ken Farmer in 1940. Daly was widely regarded as "the greatest South Australian footballer from 1877 to the close of the nineteenth century".

=== 1900–1915: pre-WWI era ===
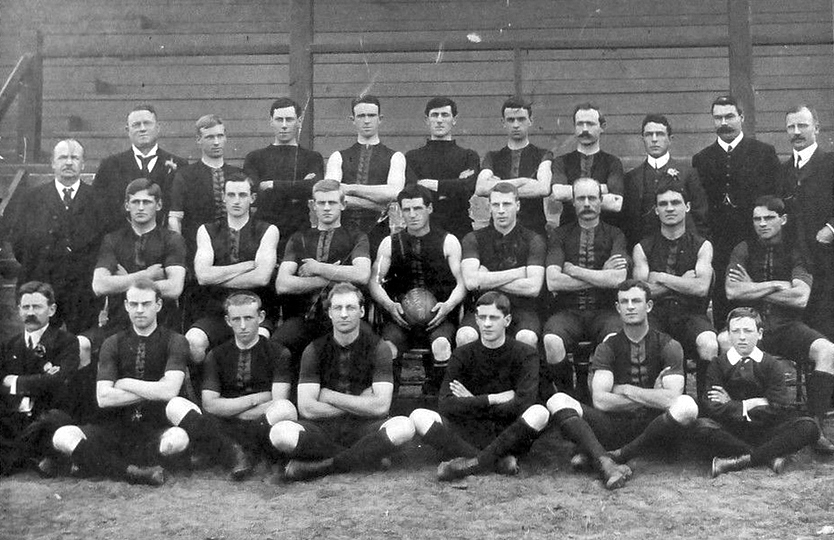
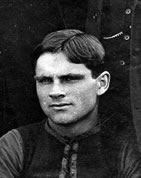
Left: Norwood's victorious 1907 Championship of Australia team.
Right: Seven-time Norwood leading goalkicker William Miller

1904 SAFA Challenge Final	G	B	Total
Norwood	9	8	62
Port Adelaide	8	10	58
Venue: Jubilee Oval	Crowd: 11,000

The 1904 Grand Final was a memorable one for Norwood who were down by 35 points at three-quarter time against traditional rival Port Adelaide. Norwood then produced an extraordinary burst of football with a goal by centre half forward Dean Dawson followed by two goals each from full forward, Bill Miller and half forward flanker, Stan Robinson. Norwood was only two points down with a minute remaining. Tommy Gibbons held a mark on a seemingly impossible angle. His kick sailed through the goal posts to give Norwood a four-point victory 9.8 to 8.10.

1907 Championship of Australia	G	B	Total
Norwood	13	12	90
Carlton	8	10	58
Venue: Adelaide Oval

Norwood were proclaimed the Champions of Australia again in 1907 when they defeated the Victorian premier, Carlton, 13.12 to 8.9 after Norwood scored 7 goals in the first 20 minutes of the third quarter. Norwood would beat Carlton again in 1921, but on this latter occasion both clubs were runners up in their respective competitions.

=== 1919–1944: Interwar period and WWII competition ===
==== 1922–1924: Thomas Leahy success ====
For his brief coaching stint, Thomas Leahy proved remarkably successful, leading the Redlegs to back to back premierships in 1922 and 1923, a feat that would not be repeated for 90 years.

==== 1925–1929: Walter Scott era ====
Walter Scott was captain-coach of the Norwood Football Club for five years, leading his team to two grand finals in 1928 and 1929, winning the latter against Port Adelaide.

=== 1945–1956: Jack Oatey era ===
Over a coaching stint of 12 years, Jack Oatey led the Redlegs to three premierships in 1946, 1948, 1950.

=== 1957–1973: Premiership drought ===
The period spanning the 1951 and 1974 seasons, totalling twenty four years, was the club's longest without a premiership.

=== 1974–1979: Robert Hammond era ===
==== 1977: NFL night series premiers ====
1977 NFL Grand Final	G	B	Total
East Perth	9	7	61
Norwood	10	9	69
Venue: Norwood Oval	Crowd: 12,000

Robert Hammond would lead the Redlegs to two premierships, one in 1975 and the other in 1978.

In 1977, Norwood defeated East Perth for the NFL night series premiership. Both of these clubs would later make bids to enter the VFL: East Perth in 1980 and Norwood in 1986. Norwood would go on to win the game 10.9 (69) to East Perth's 9.7 (61). This would be Norwood's third and last title in a national competition. Norwood were awarded $50,000 (equivalent to $313,547 in 2022) for their win.

==== 1978: 100 years of the Norwood Football Club ====
1978 SANFL Grand Final	G	B	Total
Sturt	14	26	110
Norwood	16	15	111
Venue: Football Park	Crowd: 50,867

1978 was Norwood's centenary year and Sturt, heading into the grand final, had lost only one game for the year and was odds-on favourite to win its 8th flag in 13 years. Norwood was 29 points down at three-quarter time but scored seven goals to Sturt's two in the last quarter to win the premiership by one point. Memorable moments in the match include Neil Button's effort in ruck against Sturt's Rick Davies, John Wynne's charge into the Sturt coaches box, Michael Taylor's mark 1 metre out from Sturt's goal with a minute to go, Danny Jenkin's leaping smother of a shot for goal with just seconds left to play and Brian Adamson's five goals from centre half forward. However, the most controversial moment was when field umpire Des Foster awarded a mark to Norwood's Phil Gallagher in the dying seconds of the final quarter, that resulted in a goal by Gallagher which gave Norwood a 1-point lead that would hold to the final siren.

=== 1980–1990: Neil Balme era ===
Under the leadership of Western Australian Neil Balme, the Redlegs won two premierships, one in 1982 and a second in 1984. The 1984 premiership was notable as the side came from 5th position at the end of the minor round to win the Grand Final, the first time a team outside the top four had won the competition. Two distinguished Norwood players from this era are Michael Aish and Garry McIntosh.

=== 1991–1997: National League expansion ===
==== 1991–1995: Neil Craig era ====
With the formation of the Adelaide Crows, the number of the SANFL's best players leaving the competition skyrocketed. The Norwood Football Club was hit particularly hard just avoiding the wooden spoon in successive years. However to the credit of Neil Craig, he managed to make do with what was at his disposal and in his third year as senior Redlegs coach the side made the 1993 Grand Final. However, timing was to be unfortunate and the Redlegs found themselves up against the recently created Woodville-West Torrens Eagles who were by far the strongest team of the year, losing by a club record 73 points.

==== 1996–1999: Peter Rohde era ====
1997 SANFL Home & Away Season	W	L	D	Total	%
Norwood	17	3	0	24	64.82
	Minor Premiers

The Norwood Football Club entered the 1997 SANFL season, helmed by coach Peter Rohde, with purpose and rage that would see it dominate the years competition. During the home-and-away season, the club lost only three games during the minor round with a percentage of 64.82%, second to only that of Port Adelaide's 1914 season percentage of 68.78%. The dominance of Norwood during this year was highlighted on Anzac Day when Norwood played the second-placed team of the year, Port Adelaide, winning by 122 points. However, during the second semi-final, Norwood lost to Port Adelaide. The loss proved to be a wake-up call for a side seemingly winning with ease.

1997 SANFL Grand Final	G	B	Total
Norwood	19	12	126
Port Adelaide	7	11	53
Venue: Football Park	Crowd: 44,161

The following week, a win over Central District saw them make the Grand Final, where again they would play Port Adelaide, this time in front of 44,161 eager spectators. Norwood were no longer complacent like they had been a couple weeks ago, and they dished out Port Adelaide's greatest-ever grand final defeat in the SANFL, winning by 73 points, 19.12 (126) to 7.11 (53). With midfielders Anthony Harvey, John Cunningham (Jack Oatey Medallist) and Andrew Jarman playing superbly, the Redlegs had their Magpie opponents chasing shadows all afternoon. Norwood's victory, which came during the same season Port Adelaide's controversial bid to enter the AFL came to fruition, meant the satisfaction it generated amongst Redleg supporters was euphoric.

=== 2000–2009: Tough times ===
The euphoria of the 1997 grand final victory would be short-lived, with the club only making it to another grand final once in the next decade, losing to Port Adelaide. The decade would see club revenue reduced to its minimum extent as the AFL took an economic hold of football in the state. During this time, the club picked up its 6th wooden spoon and its first for over three decades.

=== 2010–2013: Nathan Bassett and Norwood resurgence ===
Norwood won their 28th and 29th SANFL premierships in 2012 and 2013 by defeating West Adelaide and North Adelaide respectively and lost only five minor-round games over those two years (two in 2012, three in 2013). It was the first time in 90 years (1922 and 1923) that the club had won back-to-back premierships. By coincidence, Norwood defeated Wests in 1922 and North in 1923.

=== 2014–2016: Ben Warren as coach ===
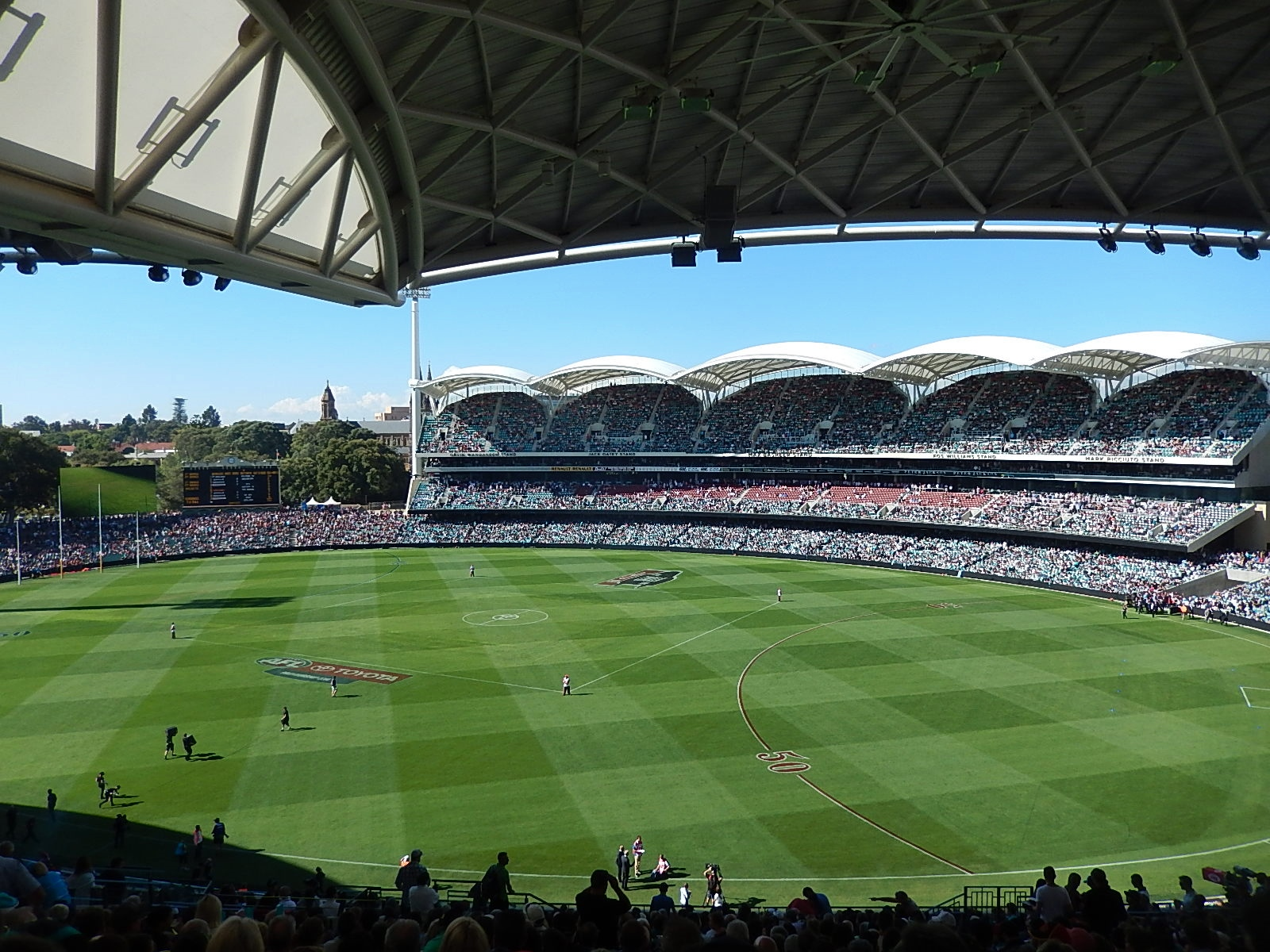
Norwood won the first Grand Final played at Adelaide Oval since 1973, defeating arch-rival Port Adelaide by 4 points in-front of 38,644 spectators.

2014 SANFL Grand Final	G	B	Total
Norwood	12	10	82
Port Adelaide	11	12	78
Venue: Adelaide Oval	Crowd: 38,644

In his first season as coach Ben Warren, with recruiting restrictions due to a salary cap breach and the loss of 12 premiership players, managed to guide the club to a Grand Final, in which Norwood defeated its biggest rival by 4 points, Norwood 12.10 (82) Port Adelaide 11.12 (78), in front of the largest Grand Final crowd for 15 years of 38,644. The win was significant given that the Port Adelaide team of 21 included 19 full-time professional AFL-listed players. It was also Norwood's 30th premiership, and completed a hat-trick following on from its 2012 and 2013 flags. The victory left Norwood as the team that won both the last Grand Final at Football Park and the first Grand Final at the newly refurbished Adelaide Oval.

In 2015, Norwood started the season 9–1 despite losing their captain Kieran McGuinness to retirement along with Gavin Hughes over the off-season, Anthony Wilson to the Adelaide Crows and Steven Baldasso suffering a season ending knee injury during the pre-season. The Redlegs were top of the ladder after Round 10 but a loss to bottom side Glenelg in round 11 would prove pivotal as they fell away in the second half of the season to only win 2 of their remaining 9 games with an horrific run of injuries to key players. They finished 4th after the minor round with 11–7, equal third with West Adelaide, but with inferior percentage were sent to an Elimination Final and were bundled out by 44 points by Central District.

The 2016 season saw the Redlegs regain Andrew Kirwan from overseas, Matt Fuller, Anthony Wilson and Jaryd Cachia from AFL duties but this did not cover the losses of James Allan, Michael Newton, Liam Davis and Mat Suckling, all to retirement, with Andrew McInnes and Mitch Wilkins returning to Melbourne after only one year and Kane Murphy returning to Sydney. The Redlegs started well with a win over archrivals, Port Adelaide, at Coopers Stadium by 25 points with Simon Phillips copping a season ending shoulder injury. A shock loss to North Adelaide by 57 points was the start of things to come as the Redlegs struggled with many injuries throughout the year which started with Michael Chippendale missing for the first six weeks and then significant injuries to key players in Bode, Panos, Cachia, Phillips and Webber throughout the year saw the Redlegs struggle without their star players. Norwood managed to win three of their last six games of the season with a shock win over ladder leaders, Woodville-West Torrens, by 24 points at Coopers Stadium which was the Redlegs stand out game in a poor season. This led to the departure of their Senior Coach, Ben Warren, with both parties not being able to come to an agreement over the club's future. Ben Warren ended with a win–loss record of 31–27.

=== 2017–present: Evolution ===
Norwood were a foundation member of the SANFL Women's (SANFLW) competition in 2017. They claimed their first (and currently only) premiership in the competition in the inaugural 2017 season.

== Tradition ==
The Norwood Football Club is one of two traditional power-house clubs in the South Australian National Football League, the other team being the Port Adelaide Football Club. As a result, their rivalry was the biggest in South Australian sport for over 100 years before the arrival of the Showdown.

=== Current club song ===
==== It's a Grand Old Flag ====
It's a grand old flag, it's a high flying flag
It's the emblem for me and for you
It's the emblem of the team we love
The team of the Red and the Blue.
Every heart beats true for the Red and the Blue
As we sing this song to you (What do we sing?)
Should auld acquaintance be forgot
Keep your eye on the Red and the Blue.

Oh the team played fine in the year twenty nine
The Redlegs that no-one could lick, lick, lick
From the crowds first yell to the final bell
The spirit of old forty six, six, six.
Every heart beats true for the Red and the Blue
As we sing this song to you (What do we sing?)
Should auld acquaintance be forgot
Keep your eye on the Red and the Blue.

(Repeat first verse)

— Author unknown. Music and partial lyrics based on You're a Grand Old Flag

=== 1878 club song ===
==== Men of Norwood ====
All who love the noble game, hear the story I proclaim;
How the Norwoods earned their fame [How they won their glory].
First, against the Souths so strong, Cheers went up, both loud and long;
Forward! Norwoods, red and blue. Fair ones' smiles encourage you.

Chorus
Cheer the bonny red and blue,
Cheer the colours fast and true,
Keep their colours still in view,
Forward! Men of Norwood.

Who will e'er forget that day, Sturdy Mac led on the play,
Giffen dashing through the fray, Kicked first goal for Norwood
And from thousand throats that cried, Cleft the air up to the skies.
Forward! Norwood, red and blue. Fair ones' eyes are watching you.

(Chorus)

When they met the sprightly Vics, With their little marks and tricks,
People thought would be a fix, Too much for the Norwoods.
Like the Souths the Vics were licked, Traynor for us one goals kicked.
Forward! Norwoods, red and blue, Wiry Vics you did subdue.

(Chorus)

Sturdy Ports and Adelaides, Little Parks [those knowing blades]
Kensingtons, who love the maids, All succumbed to Norwood.
So the first year passed away, And our men still held the sway;

Forward! Norwood, red and blue, Beauty's lips are praising you.

— Arthur Diamond, To the tune of 'Killarney'

=== Famous supporters ===
- Don Dunstan (Premier)
- Paul Kelly (musician)
- Sandy Roberts (television broadcaster)
- Bruce McAvaney (sports broadcaster)
- Angela Pippos (television broadcaster)
- Greg Champion (songwriter)
- Jim Keays (musician)

== Home grounds ==
The current home ground for the Norwood Football Club is Norwood Oval. It has been the club's home since 1901 and under current naming rights it is referred to as 'Coopers Stadium'.

- East Parklands (1878–82)
- Kensington Oval (1882–1897)
- Jubilee Oval (1898–1900)
- Norwood Oval (1901–present)
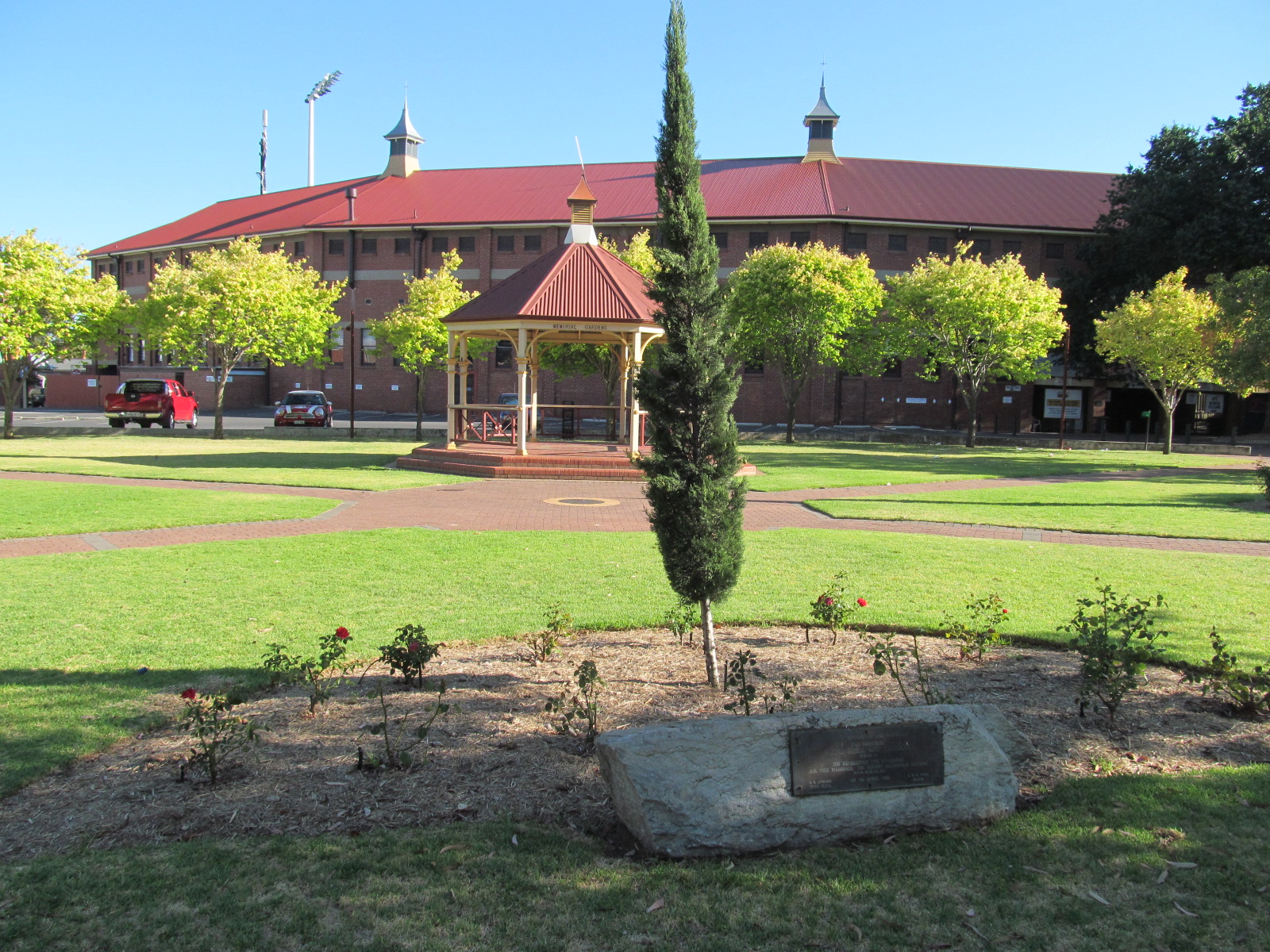
Exterior view of Norwood Oval, home of the Redlegs since 1901.

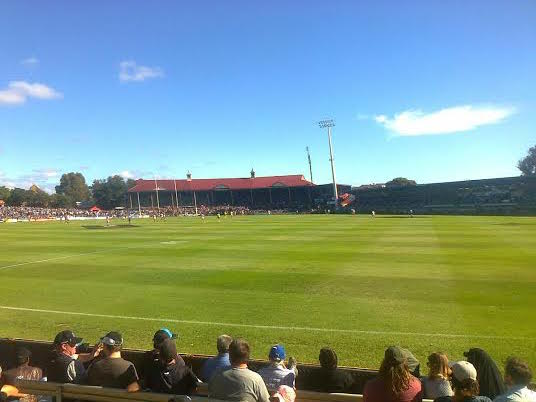
Interior of Norwood Oval looking over to the Sir Edwin Smith stand.

== Current playing list ==
Norwood Football Club · AFL personnel
Senior list			Coaching staff
1 Cooper Murley; 2 Baynen Lowe; 3 Kade Dittmar; 4 Alec Wright; 5 Pierce Seymour; 6 Thomas Donnelly; 7 Jackson Callow; 8 Finn Heard; 9 Nick Rokahr; 10 Declan Hamilton; 11 Jacob Kennerley; 12 Ben Simpson; 13 Noah Daw; 14 Mitch O'Neill; 15 Calem Krollig; 16 Alastair Lord; 17 Connor Ling; 18 Charlie Molan; 19 Corey Stockdale; 20 Matthew Ling; 21 Aaron Francis	22 Josh Murphy; 23 Oliver Sanders; 24 Alex Swinnerton; 25 Daniel Gauci; 26 Matt Harms; 27 Tom McCallum; 28 Max Hodges; 29 Mitchell Nicholas; 30 Oscar Hodge; 31 Harry Boyd; 32 Jim Kelly; 33 Luke Surman; 34 Tyson Walls; 35 Jack Heard; 36 Marco D'Annuzio; 37 Isaac Saywell; 38 Jack Aherne; 39 Jayden Gale; 41 Michael Kretschner; 42 Liam Ling	43 Jacob Jones; 44 Jack Hodges; 45 Tristan Binder; 47 Darcy Speyer; 48 Toby Turner; 49 Will Prescott; 50 Henry Holdom; 51 Jeff Rozenbilds; 52 Henry Turner; 53 Jeff Dahlitz; 54 Sam Simpson; 55 Toby Calllow; 56 Caleb Barton; 57 Mac Seal; 59 Charlie Cook; 60 Jake Hill; 61 Taj Rahui; 62 Jack Michalanney; 63 Sam Ainsworth; 64 Seb Lennon	Head coach: Jade Sheedy; Assistant coaches: James Saywell (senior assistant); Aaron Jelfs (reserves); Legend: (c) Captain(s); (vc) Vice-captain(s)

== AFL/VFL players (including Rookies) ==
There is a list of past and present Norwood players who have played at AFL/VFL:

- Matthew Ahmat (Brisbane Bears and Sydney Swans)
- James Aish (Brisbane Lions, Collingwood, and Fremantle)
- David Armour (Geelong)
- Craig Balme (Richmond)
- Neil Balme (Richmond)
- Nathan Bassett (Adelaide)
- Scott Bassett (Port Adelaide and Western Bulldogs)
- Thomas Beacham (1878–1947) (Fitzroy)
- Percy Bice (1915–1985) (Richmond)
- Dave Bland (1929–2013) (St Kilda)
- Jace Bode (Melbourne)
- Stuart Bown (Adelaide)
- Harry Boyd (St Kilda)
- Peter Brenchley (1936–1991) (Melbourne)
- Ian Brewer (1936–2010) (Collingwood)
- Luke Brown (Adelaide)
- Les Bryant (1896–1965) (Fitzroy)
- Mark Buckley (Carlton, St Kilda and Brisbane Bears)
- Jaryd Cachia (Carlton)
- Jackson Callow (Hawthorn)
- Bryce Campbell (Adelaide)
- Phil Carman (Collingwood, Melbourne, Essendon and North Melbourne)
- Kade Chandler (Melbourne)
- Harry Clapson (1895–1987) (North Melbourne)
- Adam Cockshell (Port Adelaide)
- Sudjai Cook (Adelaide)
- Jarrod Cotton (Port Adelaide)
- Jared Crouch (Sydney Swans)
- Heath Culpitt (Carlton)
- John Cunningham (Geelong)
- Clarrie Curyer (1912–2003) (St Kilda)
- Peter Dalwood (1922–2000) (Fitzroy)
- Donald Dickie (Port Adelaide)
- Ross Dillon (Melbourne)
- Scott Direen (Sydney Swans)
- Nick Duigan (Carlton)
- Trent Dumont (North Melbourne)
- Graeme Dunstan (Collingwood)
- Nathan Eagleton (Port Adelaide and Western Bulldogs)
- Simon Eastaugh (Essendon and Fremantle)
- Orazio Fantasia (Essendon)
- Geoff Feehan (St Kilda)
- Jeff Fehring (1955–2008) (Geelong and St Kilda)
- Dale Fleming (Fitzroy)
- Alex Forster (Fremantle)
- Nic Fosdike (Sydney Swans)
- Tony Francis (Collingwood and St Kilda)
- James Gallagher (Adelaide)
- Alex Georgiou (Melbourne)
- Art Gilchrist (1879–1947) (Melbourne)
- Stefan Giro (Fremantle)
- Daniel Gorringe (Gold Coast and Carlton)
- Mitch Grigg (Adelaide)
- Kevin Hardiman (1915–2002) (Essendon)
- Reg Harley (1925–2014) (South Melbourne)
- Tom Hart (1896–1971) (Carlton)
- Anthony Harvey (St Kilda)
- Tim Hazell (Hawthorn)
- Neil Hein (Brisbane Bears)
- Martin Heppell (St Kilda and Melbourne)
- Adam Heuskes (Sydney Swans, Port Adelaide and Brisbane Lions)
- Andrew Hill (Collingwood)
- Ron Hoy (Hawthorn)
- Nathon Irvin (Sydney Swans)
- Brett James (Collingwood and Adelaide)
- Roger James (Port Adelaide)
- Andrew Jarman (Adelaide)
- Tom Jonas (Port Adelaide)
- Aaron Keating (Adelaide)
- Tony Keenan (Collingwood)
- Craig Kelly (Collingwood)
- Matthew Kelly (Adelaide)
- Bob Kingston (South Melbourne)
- Brenton Klaebe (Fitzroy)
- Alastair Lord (Essendon)
- Ed Lower (North Melbourne)
- Nick Lower (Port Adelaide, Fremantle and Western Bulldogs)
- Stuart Mangin (Collingwood)
- Kris Massie (Carlton and Adelaide)
- Rodney Maynard (Adelaide)
- Paul McCormack (Carlton)
- Kieran McGuinness (Western Bulldogs)
- Andrew McInnes (Carlton)
- Bob McLean (1914–1989) (St Kilda)
- John Meesen (Adelaide and Melbourne)
- Max Michalanney (Adelaide)
- Algy Millhouse (1887–1948) (Melbourne and St Kilda)
- Will Minson (Western Bulldogs)
- Danny Morton (Fitzroy and Port Adelaide)
- Glenn Molloy (Melbourne)
- Graham Molloy (Melbourne)
- Robert Neill (Sydney Swans and St Kilda)
- John Nelson (St Kilda)
- Jacob Newton (West Coast)
- Michael Newton (Melbourne)
- Mick Nunan (Richmond)
- Jack Oatey (1920–1994) (South Melbourne)
- Cristian O'Brien (Geelong)
- David Palm (Richmond)
- Greg Parke (Melbourne, Footscray and Fitzroy)
- Joel Patfull (Brisbane Lions and GWS)
- Stephen Patterson (Collingwood)
- Harrison Petty (Melbourne)
- Darren Pfeiffer (Carlton and Port Adelaide)
- Simon Phillips (Sydney Swans and Port Adelaide)
- Martin Pike (Melbourne, Fitzroy, North Melbourne/Kangaroos and Brisbane Lions)
- Steven Pitt (Collingwood and Melbourne)
- David Pittman (Adelaide)
- Matthew Primus (Fitzroy and Port Adelaide)
- Paul Puopolo (Hawthorn)
- Harry Ralph (1919–2004) (Essendon)
- Bert Renfrey (1879–1940) (St Kilda)
- Brent Renouf (Hawthorn and Port Adelaide)
- Stephen Richardson (Essendon)
- Don Roach (1940–2011) (Hawthorn)
- Neville Roberts (Richmond)
- Jonathon Robran (Hawthorn and Essendon)
- Matthew Robran (Hawthorn and Adelaide)
- Jonathan Ross (Adelaide)
- Lester Ross (St Kilda)
- Sam Rowe (Carlton)
- Stephen Rowe (Adelaide)
- Kym Russell (Collingwood)
- Glenn Sandford (Collingwood)
- Albert Sawley (1915–1983) (St Kilda)
- Gordon Sawley (1913–1942) (South Melbourne)
- Ryan Schoenmakers (Hawthorn)
- Robert Semmens (Richmond and Footscray)
- Jack Sexton (1900–1935) (Fitzroy)
- Cameron Shenton (St Kilda)
- Sam Smart (Carlton)
- Geoff Smith (Hawthorn)
- Nick Smith (Melbourne)
- Ben Speight (North Melbourne)
- Justin Staritski (North Melbourne and Collingwood)
- Phil Stephens (1935–2015) (St Kilda)
- Grant Tanner (Geelong)
- Jim Taylor (1932–2000) (South Melbourne)
- Michael Taylor (Collingwood)
- Dean Terlich (Melbourne)
- James Thiessen (Richmond and Adelaide)
- Keith Thomas (Fitzroy)
- Matt Thomas (Port Adelaide and Richmond)
- David Trotter (Kangaroos)
- Alfred Waldron (1857–1929) (Carlton)
- Taylor Walker (Adelaide)
- Tom Warhurst, Jr. (Adelaide)
- James Wasley (Collingwood)
- Neville Way (St Kilda)
- Jim West (Sydney Swans)
- Ben Wilson (Collingwood and Sydney Swans)
- Austin Wonaeamirri (Melbourne)

== Membership and attendance ==
Year	Members	Change from previous Season	End of minor rounds	Finishing position	Average crowd	Change from previous season	Largest home crowd
2011	3,571	?	2	3	4,752	▲553	8,011
2012	3,004	▼567	1	1	4,514	▼238	6,353
2013	3,223	▲219	1	1	4,093	▼421	7,560
2014	3,121	▼102	2	1	4,110	▲17	10,014
2015	4,050	▲912	5	5	3,156	▼954	6,927
2016	3,209

== Sponsorship ==
The club's main sponsors, since guernsey sponsorship was introduced in 1978, have been as follows:

Years	Major Guernsey Sponsor
1978–1994	Australian Guarantee Corporation
1995–2000	Villis Family Bakery
2001–2005	Coopers Brewery
2006–2017	Fairmont Homes
2018–2020	Veolia
2021–2024	Apelle
2025–present	IWS

Years	Below Number Sponsor
1994–2000	Villis Family Bakery
2001–2005	Coopers Brewery
2006–2017	Fairmont Homes
2018–present	IWS Group

Years	Other Front Jumper Sponsor
1997–2000	Be Smoke Free
2016–present	Paradise Motors Mazda
2016–2019	Balfours
2020–2021	Schiavello
2022–present	Barossa Boy

Years	Above Number Sponsor
2001–2004	Be Smoke Free
2014–2017	Australian Outdoor Living
2018–2019	Fairmont Homes
2020–present	Peoples Choice Credit Union

Years	Guernsey Manufacturer
2001–2012	Asics
2013–2015	VIV Sports
2016–2020	ISC
2021–2024	Apelle
2025–present	New Balance

== Honour roll ==
Norwood Football Club honour roll
South Australian Football Association era
Year	Final position	W-L-D	%	Coach	Captain	Best and Fairest	Leading goalkicker	Goals
1878	1 (Premiers)	8–0–4	94	Joseph Osborn	Joseph Osborn	—N/a	William Dedman	12*
1879	1 (Premiers)	9–0–1	91	Joseph Osborn	Joseph Osborn	—N/a	William Dedman	12*
1880	1 (Premiers)	7–2–1	86	Joseph Osborn	Joseph Osborn	—N/a	Joseph Traynor	7*
1881	1 (Premiers)	10–0–3	82	Alfred Waldron	Alfred Waldron	—N/a	Joe Pollock; W.J. Duffy	7*
1882	1 (Premiers)	13–1–0	75	Alfred Waldron	Alfred Waldron	—N/a	Jim Watson	12
1883	1 (Premiers)	12–3–1	70	Alfred Waldron	Alfred Waldron	—N/a	Frederick Letchford	7
1884	2 (Runner-up)	9–4–1	64	Alfred Waldron	Alfred Waldron	—N/a	Frederick Letchford	10
1885	2 (Runner-up)	7–7–1	67	Alfred Waldron	Alfred Waldron	—N/a	A.B. Rowe	9
1886	3	7–6–1	59	Alfred Roberts	Alfred Roberts	—N/a	Frederick Letchford	8
1887	1 (Premiers)	12–2–4	75	Alfred Waldron	Alfred Waldron	—N/a	John Daly	15
1888	1 (Premiers); Champions of Australia	14–1–2	59	Alfred Waldron	Alfred Waldron	—N/a	Charles Woods	29*
1889	1 (Premiers)	15–2–1	77	Alfred Waldron	Alfred Waldron	—N/a	Charles Woods	31
1890	2 (Runner-up)	15–3–0	73	Alfred Waldron	Alfred Waldron	—N/a	Charles Woods	44
1891	1 (Premiers)	13–3–0	72	Alfred Grayson	Alfred Grayson	—N/a	Charles Woods	55*
1892	3	10–6–0	67	Alfred Waldron	Alfred Waldron	—N/a	Charles Woods	46*
1893	2 (Runner-up)	12–3–3	72	Henry Plunkett; John Daly	Henry Plunkett; John Daly	—N/a	Anthony Daly	88*
1894	1 (Premiers)	14–5–1	62	John Daly	John Daly	—N/a	Anthony Daly	48*
1895	2 (Runner-up)	11–4–1	65	John Daly	John Daly	—N/a	Anthony Daly	46*
1896	2 (Runner-up)	10–6–2	59	Jack Holbrook	Jack Holbrook	—N/a	Charles Woods	20
1897	3	11–5–1	66	Richard Correll	Richard Correll	John Daly	Charles Woods	24
1898	3	8–7–0	53	Richard Correll	Richard Correll	—N/a	Anthony Daly	12
1899	2 ( Grand finalist)	11–4–1	60	Ernest Peters	Ernest Peters	—N/a	William Miller	26
1900	4	8–7–0	52	William Plunkett	William Plunkett	—N/a	William Miller	23
1901	1 (Premiers)	14–5–0	60	Garsham Barnes	Garsham Barnes	James Gosse	William Miller	44*
1902	5	6–6–0	66	Garsham Barnes	Garsham Barnes	W. Trembath	William Miller	21
1903	4	8–5–0	71	William Plunkett	William Plunkett	William Plunkett	William Miller	27
1904	1 (Premiers)	12–2–1	71	Phil Newland	Phil Newland	Alby Bahr; Lionel Hill	William Miller	35*
1905	3	8–5–0	60	James Gosse	James Gosse	William Miller	William Miller	24
1906	3	12–2–0	68	Dean Dawson Phil Newland	Dean Dawson; Phil Newland	Charles Gwynne	Lionel Hill	21
South Australian Football League era
Year	Final position	W-L-D		Coach	Captain	Best and Fairest	Leading goalkicker	Goals
1907	1 (Premiers); Champions of Australia	12–3–0	58	Alby Bahr	Alby Bahr	Charles Gwynne	Leonard Chamberlain	27
1908	2 ( Grand finalist)	11–3–1	61	Alby Bahr	Alby Bahr	Alby Bahr Lionel Hill	Jack Chamberlain	30
1909	2 ( Grand finalist)	8–6–0	54	John Woods	Alby Bahr	Lionel Hill	Richard Townsend	22*
1910	3	7–7–0	53	John Woods	Alby Bahr	Lance Lewis	Leonard Chamberlain	19
1911	5	6–6–0	46	Alby Bahr	Charles McGavisk	Phil Robin	Richard Townsend	18
1912	6	4–8–0	44	Alby Bahr	Alby Bahr	Richard Townsend	Leonard Chamberlain	23
1913	7 (Wooden Spoon)	2–10–0	44	William Plunkett	Victor Stephens	Sidney White	Walter Steele	13
1914	7 (Wooden Spoon)	4–8–0	45	Algernon Millhouse	Algernon Millhouse	Sidney White	Guy Stephens	19
1915	7 (Wooden Spoon)	3–9–0	40	Clarence Packham	Clarence Packham	Clarence Packham	Guy Stephens	11
Play suspended due to WWI
1919	7 (Wooden Spoon)	1–11–0	40	William Hutton	Sidney White	Spencer Sibley	Spencer Sibley	18
1920	2 ( Grand finalist)	7–7–0		William Hutton	Richard Townsend	Walter Scott	Richard Townsend	15
1921	2 ( Grand finalist)	11–6–1	52	William Hutton	Sidney White	Walter Scott	Roy Bent	44*
1922	1 (Premiers)	14–2–0	64	Tom Leahy	Sidney White	Claude Toovey	Tom Hart	50*
1923	1 (Premiers)	13–2–1	56	Tom Leahy	Sidney White	Walter Scott	Roy Bent	50
1924	3	10–5–1	58	Tom Leahy	Sidney White	Alick Lill	Roy Bent	54*
1925	1 (Premiers)	13–3–0	60	Sidney White	Sidney White	Alick Lill	Roy Bent	59*
1926	3	10–6–0	53	Walter Scott	Walter Scott	Walter Scott	Roy Bent	65*
South Australian National Football League era
Year	Final position	W-L-D		Coach	Captain	Best and Fairest	Leading goalkicker	Goals
1927	6	7–10–0	48	Walter Scott	Walter Scott	Alick Lill	Alfred Biddell	36
1928	2 ( Grand finalist)	12–8–0	51	Walter Scott	Walter Scott	Walter Scott	Heinrich Krome	38
1929	1 (Premiers)	14–4–1	57	Walter Scott	Walter Scott	Charles Daly	Lyall Mutton	41
1930	3	11–6–1	54	Walter Scott	Walter Scott	Walter Scott	Heinrich Krome	39
1931	4	9–9–0	48	Alick Lill; Ernest Wadham; Walter Scott	Alick Lill; Ernest Wadham; Joseph Johns	Joseph Johns	Heinrich Krome	28
1932	3	11–8–0	51	Walter Scott	Joseph Johns	Alfred Biddell	Bill McCallum	37
1933	2 ( Grand finalist)	12–8–2	53	Alick Lill	Eric Johnson	Frederick McCallum	Heinrich Krome	53
1934	7	5–12–0	46	Alick Lill	Heinrich Krome; Lavington Chinnery	Harold Allington	Bruce Schultz	66
1935	4	11–7–0	51	Jack Sexton; Sidney Ackland; Eric Johnson; Thomas Woodfoofe	Jack Sexton; Thomas Woodroofe	Thomas Woodroofe	Bruce Schultz	66
1936	5	10–7–0	53	Sidney Ackland	Thomas Woodroofe	Bill McCallum	Ron Brown	64
1937	3	13–6–0	58	Sidney Ackland	Thomas Woodroofe	Albert Sawley	Ron Brown	95
1938	3	13–6–0	56	Alan Arthur	Thomas Woodroofe	Frederick McCallum	Ron Brown	86
1939	4	11–7–0	50	Alan Arthur	Thomas Woodroofe; Hubert Warhurst	Hubert Warhurst	Bruce Schultz	98
1940	4	8–10–0	52	Kevin Hardiman; Alan Smith	Kevin Hardiman; Hubert Warhurst; Bruce Schultz	Jack Oatey	Bruce Schultz	90
1941	1 (Premiers)	15–5–0	58	Frederick Percy McCallum	Kevin Hardiman	Jack Oatey	Bruce Schultz	100*
Temporary geographical merger with North Adelaide during WWII
1942	3	3-9-0	46	Frederick Percy McCallum	Kevin Hardiman			
1943	1 (Premiers)	5-7-0	47				William Isaac	73
1944	1 (Premiers)	3-9-0	45				William Isaac	76
Competition returns to unaligned teams
1945	3	11–8–0	57	Jack Oatey	Jack Oatey	Jack Oatey	Neville Way	39
1946	1 (Premiers)	16–3–0	58	Jack Oatey	Jack Oatey	Douglas Olds	Peter Dalwood	70*
1947	2 ( Grand finalist)	16–3–0	58	Jack Oatey	Jack Oatey	Douglas Olds	Neville Way	49
1948	1 (Premiers)	16–3–0	57	Jack Oatey	Jack Oatey	Jack Oatey	Graham Farrow	64
1949	3	12–7–0	54	Jack Oatey	Jack Oatey	John Marriott	Peter Dalwood	41
1950	1 (Premiers)	15–4–0	61	Jack Oatey	Jack Oatey	Douglas Olds	Ron Williams	59
1951	5	9–9–0	52	Jack Oatey	Jack Oatey	John Marriott	Max Mayo	29
1952	2 ( Grand finalist)	12–8–0	53	Jack Oatey	Jack Oatey	Kevin Gallagher	Peter Dalwood	27
1953	4	10–9–0	52	Jack Oatey	John Marriott	Max Mayo	Max Mayo	78*
1954	4	9–10–0	51	Jack Oatey	John Marriott	Robert Edwards	Peter Vivian	35
1955	2 ( Grand finalist)	12–6–1	55	Jack Oatey	John Marriott	John Marriott	Norman Walker	39
1956	4	10–9–0	49	Jack Oatey	John Marriott	Ron Reimann	Robert Fosdike	33
1957	2 ( Grand finalist)	13–8–0	51	Haydn Bunton, Jr.	Ron Reimann	Norman Walker	Norman Walker	37
1958	4	7–11–1	47	Haydn Bunton, Jr.	Haydn Bunton, Jr.	Graham Nicholls	Peter Vivian	27
1959	6	7–11–0	47	Alan Killigrew	Peter Vivian	Graham Nicholls	Peter Vivian	35
1960	2 ( Grand finalist)	13–8–0	55	Alan Killigrew	Peter Aish	Peter Aish	Phil Stephens	50
1961	2 ( Grand finalist)	13–9–0	54	Alan Killigrew	Peter Aish	Peter Aish; Kingsley Wedding	John Lill	40
1962	3	12–8–1	54	Alan Killigrew	Peter Aish	Kingsley Wedding	John Lill	52
1963	5	11–9–0	49	Douglas Olds	Ron Kneebone	Kingsley Wedding	Mark Skinner	37
1964	6	9–10–1	49	Douglas Olds	Ron Kneebone	Kingsley Wedding	Robert Martin	30
1965	4	13–8–0	56	Haydn Bunton, Jr.	Haydn Bunton, Jr.	Kingsley Wedding	Ian Brewer	96*
1966	7	9–11–0	48	Haydn Bunton, Jr.	Haydn Bunton, Jr.	Ron Kneebone	Ian Brewer	76
1967	6	10–10–0	49	Haydn Bunton, Jr.	Haydn Bunton, Jr.	Robert Oatey	Robert Oatey	45
1968	10 (Wooden Spoon)	3–16–1	45	Robert Oatey	Robert Oatey	Robert Oatey	Robert Oatey	30
1969	9	3–17–0	43	Robert Oatey	Robert Oatey	Gil Butchart	Robert Oatey	33
1970	5	10–8–2	50	Robert Oatey	Robert Oatey	Michael Poulter	Michael Coligan	77
1971	5	10–11–0	51	Robert Oatey	Robert Oatey	Robert Oatey	Roger Woodcock	58
1972	4	14–7–1	54	Robert Oatey	Robert Oatey	Robert Oatey	Michael Coligan	81*
1973	4	11–12–0	52	Robert Oatey	Robert Oatey	Michael Taylor	Ross Dillon	46
1974	4	16–8–0	57	Robert Hammond	Robert Hammond	Michael Taylor	Roger Woodcock	68
1975	1 (Premiers)	18–3–0	58	Robert Hammond	John Wynne	Ross Dillon	Ross Dillon	66
1976	4	12–11–0	52	Robert Hammond	John Wynne	Rodney Pope	Jim Michalanney	63
1977	5	13–10–0	58	Robert Hammond	John Wynne	Neil Craig	Paul Adler	67
1978	1 (Premiers)	18–8–0	56	Robert Hammond	Michael Taylor	Michael Taylor	Roger Woodcock	42
1979	4	12–12–0	54	Robert Hammond	Michael Taylor	Michael Taylor	Bruce Winter	45
1980	2 ( Grand finalist)	15–11–0	50	Neil Balme	Michael Taylor	Michael Taylor	Roger Woodcock	62
1981	3	15–9–1	54	Neil Balme	Phil Gallagher	Michael Aish	Gary Menzel	37
1982	1 (Premiers)	18–7–0	57	Neil Balme	Phil Gallagher; Greg Turbill	Greg Turbill	Neville Roberts	83
1983	3	15–10–0	55	Neil Balme	Greg Turbill	Michael Aish	Neville Roberts	111
1984	1 (Premiers)	17–9–0	51	Neil Balme	Danny Jenkins	Michael Aish	Neville Roberts	98
1985	4	14–9–1	52	Neil Balme	Neville Roberts	Keith Thomas	Neville Roberts	47
1986	5	12–11–0	52	Neil Balme	Neville Roberts	Michael Taylor	Keith Thomas	40
1987	3	15–10–0	55	Neil Balme	Michael Aish	Garry McIntosh	Mark Ducker	54
1988	3	15–10–0	57	Neil Balme	Michael Aish	Richard Anderson	Rodney Maynard	50
1989	3	14–11–0	52	Neil Balme	Michael Aish	Rodney Maynard	Andrew Pascoe	47
1990	5	12–9–0	54	Neil Balme	Garry McIntosh	Stephen Rowe	James Weeding	50
1991	7	7–14–1	48	Neil Craig	Garry McIntosh	Garry McIntosh	David Payne	51
1992	7	9–13–0	52	Neil Craig	Garry McIntosh	Michael Aish	Mark Jones	54
1993	2 ( Grand finalist)	15–9–0	54	Neil Craig	Garry McIntosh	Stephen Patterson	Chris Prime	87
1994	4	12–12–0	52	Neil Craig	Garry McIntosh	Jerry D'Antiochia	Chris Prime	53
1995	3	17–8–0	59	Neil Craig	Garry McIntosh	Matthew Primus	James Thiessen	54
1996	3	16–7–0	56	Peter Rohde	Garry McIntosh	John Cunningham	Ashley Reade	65
1997	1 (Premiers)	19–4–0	65	Peter Rohde	Garry McIntosh	Andrew Jarman	Jim West	80*
1998	4	12–10–0	52	Peter Rohde	Garry McIntosh; Anthony Harvey	Anthony Harvey	Cristian O'Brien	31
1999	2 ( Grand finalist)	15–9–0	52	Peter Rohde	Anthony Harvey	Steven Pitt	Robert Neill	36
2000	5	10–11–0	52	Neville Roberts	Anthony Harvey	Scott Direen	Robert Neill	42
2001	4	12–10–0	52	Neville Roberts	Anthony Harvey	Troy Clements	Scott Borlace; Robert Neill	34
2002	3	17–5–0	58	Garry McIntosh	Brett James	Brett James	Jarrod Cotton	42
2003	6	9–10–1	48	Garry McIntosh	Brett James	Brett James	Robert Neill	38
2004	9 (Wooden Spoon)	4–16–0	42	Garry McIntosh	Brett James	Scott Borlace	Matthew Bartemucci	26
2005	6	9–11–0	47	Dale Lewis	Brett James	Brett James	Robert Neill	44
2006	7	9–11–0	46	Trevor Hill	Brett James	Scott Borlace	Jamie Vlatko	31
2007	7	8–12–0	47	Trevor Hill	James Gallagher	James Gallagher	Jamie Vlatko	60
2008	4	10–11–1	48	Trevor Hill	James Gallagher	James Gallagher	Taylor Walker	56
2009	7	7–13–0	49	Trevor Hill; Jarrod Cotton	James Gallagher	Brett Zorzi	Sam Rowe	40
2010	2 ( Grand finalist)	14–10–0	55	Nathan Bassett	James Gallagher	Nick Lower	Sam Rowe	40
2011	3	15–8–0	55	Nathan Bassett	James Gallagher	Kieran McGuinness	Cameron Shenton	43
2012	1 (Premiers)	20–2–0	63	Nathan Bassett	Kieran McGuinness	Brett Zorzi	Luke Jericho	41
2013	1 (Premiers)	19–3–0	63	Nathan Bassett	Kieran McGuinness	Ben Jefferies	Ben Warren	36
2014	1 (Premiers)	14–7–0	56	Ben Warren	Kieran McGuinness	Kieran McGuinness	Michael Newton	55
2015	5	11–8–0	51	Ben Warren	Alex Georgiou	Matthew Panos	Simon Phillips	17
2016	8	6–12–0	46	Ben Warren	Alex Georgiou; Jace Bode	Matthew Fuller	Lewis Johnston	31
2017	5	10–8–1	46	Jarrod Cotton	Jace Bode	Alex Georgiou	Kristian Roocke	26
2018	2 (Grand finalist)			Jarrod Cotton	Jace Bode	Mitch Grigg	Mitch Grigg	35
2019	4			Jarrod Cotton	Jace Bode			
2020	5	6–8–0	47.45	Jarrod Cotton	Matthew Panos			
2021	4			Jade Rawlings	Matthew Nunn			
2022	1 (Premiers)			Jade Rawlings	Matthew Nunn			
2023	7	6–11–1	45.76	Jade Rawlings	Matthew Nunn; Jacob Kennerley			
2024	2 (Grand finalist)			Jade Rawlings	Jacob Kennerley	Harry Boyd	Jackson Callow	31
2025	3			Jade Sheedy	Jacob Kennerley	Billy Cootee	Tristan Binder	39
2026	1 (Premiers)			Jade Sheedy	Jacob Kennerley	Nik Rokahr	Tristan Binder	47

- Signifies SANFL leading goal kicker

== Hall of Fame ==
In 2006, the Norwood Football Club board wrote a charter to establish a club Hall of Fame and Hall of Fame Committee, with the express purpose of "recognis[ing] and enshrin[ing] players, coaches, volunteers, honorary officials and administrators who have made a most significant contribution to the Norwood Football Club since its inception in 1878." The Hall of Fame Committee were tasked with selecting a maximum of 30 members for the inaugural induction ceremony, with up to 25 players and up to five coaches, volunteers, honorary officials or administrators from across the broad history of Norwood. Like other SANFL clubs, the charter initially adopted the practice of using broad historical eras to categorize members; in the case of Norwood, five eras were outlined: a) 1878 to 1906; b) 1907 to 1941; c) 1946 to 1969; d) 1970 to 1990; and e) 1991 and onwards. The committee were also tasked with expanding the Hall of Fame by admitting up to five new members each year. There are currently 63 members in the Norwood Hall of Fame. In 2018, five of those members were upgraded to Legend status. The categorization below follows that of the club's history website, Redlegs Museum.

- Members with names in **bold** are also in the South Australian Football Hall of Fame
- Members with an asterisk* next to their names are also in the Australian Football Hall of Fame

Norwood Football Club Hall of Fame
**Legends**
**Michael Aish**	**Garry McIntosh**	**Wally Miller**	**Walter Scott** *	**Michael Taylor**
**The Leaders**
Bert Baulderstone	Sir James Gosse	Theodor Heidenreich	Joseph Osborn	Sir Edwin T. Smith
Joe Tripodi	**John J Woods**			
**The 1870S to the 1960s**
Syd Ackland	Alby Bahr	Roy Bent	Lionel Blackmore	Peter Dalwood
Anthony Daly	**John Daly** *	Sam Gallagher	Alfred Grayson	Lionel Hill
Frederick McCallum	**Doug Olds**	Albert Sawley	Bruce Schultz	Guy Stephens
Joseph Traynor	**Alfred Waldron**	Hubert Warhurst	Kingsley Wedding	**Sid White**
**The 1970S to the 1990s**
Neil Button	Jerry D'Antiochia	**Phil Gallagher**	**Rodney Maynard**	Jim Michalanney
**Neville Roberts**	**Keith Thomas**	Roger Woodcock		
**The Clubmen**
Neil Balme	Reginald Dawson	Arthur Diamond	William Griffiths	**Thomas S. Hill**
Eric Johnson	William Potts	Glen Rosser	**Brian Sando**	**Ernest Wadham**
George Webb				
**The Captains**
Peter Aish	**Brett James**	Danny Jenkins	**Jack Oatey** *	**Robert Oatey**
Greg Turbill	**John Wynne**			
**The Medallists**
Alby Green	**Ron Kneebone**	**Alick Lill**	**John Marriott**	Bill McCallum

== Club achievements ==
Premierships
Competition	Level	Wins	Years won
South Australian National Football League	Men's Seniors	32	1878, 1879, 1880, 1881, 1882, 1883, 1887, 1888, 1889, 1891, 1894, 1901, 1904, 1907, 1922, 1923, 1925, 1929, 1941, 1946, 1948, 1950, 1975, 1978, 1982, 1984, 1997, 2012, 2013, 2014, 2022, 2026
South Australian National Football League	Women's Seniors	1	2017
South Australian National Football League	Men's Reserves	22	1906, 1910, 1921, 1930, 1937, 1938, 1939, 1960, 1961, 1969, 1970, 1972, 1974, 1975, 1976, 1978, 1985, 1986, 1995, 1998, 2019, 2024
South Australian National Football League	Boys Under 19s (1937–2008)	17	1940, 1945, 1947, 1952, 1960, 1963, 1965, 1971, 1972, 1980, 1983, 1985, 1986, 1988, 1990, 1995, 1997
South Australian National Football League	Boys Under 17s (1939–2008)	9	1965, 1981, 1982, 1983, 1984, 1986, 1988, 1989, 1991
South Australian National Football League	Boys Under 18s (2009–present)	2	2015, 2020
South Australian National Football League	Boys Under 16s (2010–present)	1	2012
South Australian National Football League	Girls Under 18s (2026–present)	1	2026
Other titles and honours
Championship of Australia	Men's Seniors	2	1888, 1907
Stanley H Lewis Trophy	Multiple	15	1965, 1974, 1982, 1984, 1985, 1986, 1987, 1995, 1996, 1997, 1998, 2011, 2012, 2018, 2026
SANFL Pre-Season Premiership	Men's Seniors	2	1956, 1958
NFL Night Series	Men's Seniors	1	1977
Finishing positions
South Australian National Football League	Minor premiership (men's seniors)	21	1889, 1894, 1901, 1908, 1922, 1923, 1925, 1929, 1937, 1946, 1947, 1948, 1950, 1976, 1997, 2012, 2013, 2018, 2024, 2026
South Australian National Football League	Grand Finalists (men's seniors)	24	1884, 1885, 1890, 1893, 1895, 1896, 1899, 1908, 1920, 1921, 1928, 1933, 1947, 1952, 1955, 1957, 1960, 1961, 1980, 1993, 1999, 2010, 2018, 2024
South Australian National Football League	Wooden spoons (men's seniors)	6	1913, 1914, 1915, 1919, 1968, 2004
South Australian National Football League	Minor premiership (women's seniors)	2	2019, 2021
South Australian National Football League	Grand Finalists (women's seniors)	3	2017, 2024, 2026

== Individual awards ==
=== Magarey Medallists ===
- 1898 – Alby Green
- 1915 – Charlie Perry
- 1921 – Walter Scott
- 1924 – Walter Scott
- 1925 – Alick Lill
- 1930 – Walter Scott
- 1936 – Bill McCallum
- 1951 – John Marriott
- 1966 – Ron Kneebone
- 1981 – Michael Aish
- 1994 – Garry McIntosh
- 1995 – Garry McIntosh
- 1997 – Andrew Jarman
- 2013 – Matt Thomas
- 2017 – Mitch Grigg
- 2018 – Mitch Grigg
- 2024 – Harry Boyd
- 2026 - Nik Rokahr

=== Fos Williams Medallists ===
- 1983 – Michael Aish
- 1984 – Garry McIntosh
- 1990 – Andrew Jarman
- 1992 – Garry McIntosh
- 1994 – Scott Burns
- 1995 – Garry McIntosh
- 1997 – James Thiessen
- 1998 – Paul McCormack
- 1999 – Anthony Harvey
- 2005 – Scott Borlace
- 2022 – Casey Voss

=== Jack Oatey Medallists ===
- 1982 – Danny Jenkins
- 1984 – Keith Thomas
- 1997 – John Cunningham
- 2012 – Dean Terlich
- 2013 – Brett Zorzi
- 2014 – Matt Panos
- 2016 – Jack Stephens
- 2017 – Matt Panos
- 2018 – Mitch Grigg
- 2022 – Harry Boyd
- 2026 – Baynen Lowe

=== Ken Farmer Medallists ===
- 1997 – Jim West

=== All-Australians ===
Sporting Life Magazine

- 1947 – Sam Gallagher
- 1950 – John Marriott, Doug Olds
- 1951 – John Marriott
- 1952 – John Marriott
- 1954 – John Marriott
- 1955 – Jim Taylor, John Marriott

Interstate carnivals

- 1953 – John Marriott
- 1961 – Kingsley Wedding
- 1969 – Graham Molloy
- 1983 – Michael Aish
- 1986 – Michael Aish (vice-captain)

== Club records ==
=== Attendances ===
- Coopers Stadium: 20,280 v Port Adelaide, 1971 round 8
- Adelaide Oval: 58,924 v Port Adelaide, 1957 SANFL Grand Final
- AAMI Stadium: 53,283 v Glenelg, 1975 SANFL Grand Final

=== Most games ===
- 371 – Garry McIntosh (1982–1998)

=== Most goals in a season ===
- 111 – Neville Roberts (1983)

=== Most goals ===
- 669 – Bruce Schultz (1933–1941)

=== Most years as coach ===
- 12 – Jack Oatey (1945–56)

=== Most premierships as coach ===
- 3 – Jack Oatey (1946, 1948, 1950)

=== Most years as captain ===
- 9 – Alfred Waldron (1881–84, 1887–90, 1892)
- 9 – Garry McIntosh (1990–98)

=== Most premierships as captain ===
- 6 – Alfred Waldron (1881, 1882, 1883, 1887, 1888, 1889)

=== Most best and fairest awards ===
- 6 – Walter Scott (1920–21, 1923, 1926, 1928, 1930)
- 6 – Michael Taylor (1973–74, 1978–80, 1986)

=== Highest score ===
- 33.21 (219) v North Adelaide 10.9 (69) at Norwood Oval in Round 6, 1977

=== Most state games ===
- 39 – Walter Scott, 1920–32
