= Alby Green =

Australian rules footballer and cricketer

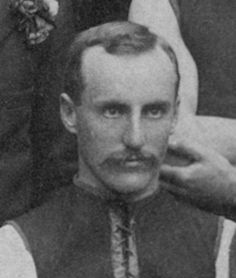

Personal information
- Full name: Albert Green
- Born: 28 January 1874; Medindee, New South Wales
- Died: c. 1913 (aged 38–39)
- Original team: Geelong Grammar School

Playing career^{1}
Years	Club	Games (Goals)
1892	Geelong (VFA)	13
1893–1898	Norwood (SAFA)	?
- ^{1} Playing statistics correct to the end of 1898.

Career highlights
- Magarey Medalist (1898)

Albert Green (28 January 1874 – c. 1913) was an Australian rules footballer who played with Norwood in the SAFA and first-class cricketer who played for South Australia.

== Early life ==
Born in Menindee, New South Wales, Green was raised in Adelaide and first became prominent in football through his schooling at Saint Peters College in Adelaide and then at Geelong Grammar School. At Geelong he captained the school's football team and cricket team, rowed in the head of the river and was a champion tennis player, athlete and marksman.

== Playing career ==
He played 13 Victorian Football Association (VFA) matches for the Geelong Football Club in 1892.

In 1893 at age 19 he arrived back in Adelaide, South Australia towards the end of the cricket season, and played for the Norwood Cricket Club. His performances created a most favorable impression. He threw in his lot with the Norwood Football Club in the SAFA and his play from the start to the end of the 1893 season was a series of brilliant successes. It was reported that he was remarkably clever, cool, and collected, and his magnificent performances in any department of the game placed him head and shoulders above any other player.

Playing mainly as a rover, Green was a member of Norwood's 1894 premiership side. In 1898 Green became the inaugural winner of the Magarey Medal which was awarded by William Magarey the SAFA Chairman for the fairest and most brilliant player of the season. When players became tied to local clubs by residence, he retired from the game in preference to changing clubs or moving house.

He also played seven first-class cricket matches for South Australia between 1894–95 and 1898–99.

== 1898 Magarey Medal ==
In 1935, Green's Magarey Medal mysteriously turned up in a pawnbroker shop and it was bought by a great Norwood benefactor, Ted Heidenreich, who gave it to the club. It still remains in the Norwood Football Club Museum.
