= Bruce Schultz (footballer) =

Australian rules footballer and cricketer

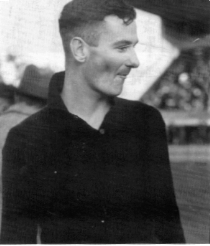

Personal information
- Full name: Bruce Schultz
- Born: 13 March 1913; Royston Park, South Australia
- Died: 11 January 1980 (aged 66); Modbury, South Australia
- Position: Full-forward

Playing career^{1}
Years	Club	Games (Goals)
1933–1941	Norwood	124 (669)

Representative team honours
Years	Team	Games (Goals)
1933-1941	South Australia	6 (23)
- ^{1} Playing statistics correct to the end of 1941.

Bruce Schultz (13 March 1913 – 11 January 1980) was an Australian rules footballer who played with Norwood in the South Australian National Football League (SANFL). He also played Sheffield Shield cricket for South Australia and grade cricket at East Torrens.

Schultz is the full-forward in Norwood's official "Team of the Century" and holds the club record for most goals kicked, at 669. His best match tally of 19 goals, which included two posters, was achieved in his penultimate game. He scored 10 or more goals in a game on 12 occasions and averaged 5.4 goals a game, which for comparison is more than prolific VFL/AFL forwards Gary Ablett, Jason Dunstall and Tony Lockett managed in their careers; only Peter Hudson (5.64) and John Coleman (5.48) have higher averages. On the six occasions he represented the South Australian interstate team, he kicked 23 goals.

Tall and thin, Schultz was a strong aerialist and started out at Norwood in 1933. He topped Norwood's goal-kicking in both 1934 and 1935 but over the next three seasons was surpassed as his club's main forward by R. J. Brown.

His father, Julius 'Ern' Schultz, had represented the state as a first-class cricketer and he followed in his footsteps in the 1936–37 Sheffield Shield season when he was called up to the state squad. An all-rounder, Schultz was a right handed middle order batsman and right arm fast-medium bowler. He made his first-class and Shield debut at the Adelaide Oval, against New South Wales. Batting at number seven, he scored 30 in the first innings and bowled first change, taking the wickets of Harold Mudge and captain Alan McGilvray for figures of 2/29. In the second innings he added another 28 runs, after being promoted one place up the order, but was only required to bowl two overs as South Australia sealed a 109 runs win. On Christmas, just a few days later, Schultz was picked for his second and final match, against Queensland at the same venue. He was used at six in both innings and scored 41 and 33. After not being required to bowl in the first innings, he bowled a couple of overs and ran out future Test wicket-keeper Don Tallon as Queensland fell 112 runs short in their chase. In both of his matches, Schultz had the honour of bowling with Shield legend Clarrie Grimmett.

In 1939, he was back to his best for Norwood and kicked 98 goals for the season, with another 90 coming in 1940 when he was club captain. On both occasions he finished the year as the leading goal-kicker at Norwood. Despite his high numbers it still wasn't enough to top the league, with North Adelaide great Ken Farmer being in his prime.

Schultz finally got the better of Farmer in 1940 when he kicked exactly 100 goals for the year and won the league's goal-kicking award. He reached the milestone in Norwood's round 13 clash but moments after kicking the two goals he required, had to be taken off the field with a severe knee injury which ended his career. Before the injury he had been on track to beat the then season record of 134 goals by Farmer. He was nonetheless the first Norwood player to kick a century of goals and it remained their highest season tally until Neville Roberts kicked 111 goals in 1983.
