= John Wynne (footballer) =

Australian rules footballer

Personal information
- Full name: John Francis Wynne
- Born: 24 September 1947 (age 79)

Playing career
| Years | Club | Games (Goals) |
| 1966–1969 | West Perth | 85 (79) |
| 1970–1982 | Norwood | 193 (110) |

Representative team honours
| Years | Team | Games (Goals) |
| | Western Australia | 4 (?) |
| | South Australia | 8 (?) |

International team honours
| 1968 | Australia | |

Coaching career
| Years | Club | Games (W–L–D) |
| 1985–1986 | West Perth | 43 (21–21–1) |

Career highlights
- WANFL Premiership - 1969; SANFL Premiership - 1975, 1978

John Francis Wynne (born 24 September 1947) is a former Australian rules footballer who played 193 games for Norwood in the SANFL as well as 84 games with WANFL club West Perth. He is on the interchange bench in Norwood’s official ‘Team of the Century’.

Wynne started his career at West Perth where he was a centre-half forward and played in their 1969 premiership team. The following season he transferred to Norwood where he would spend his next 13 years, often being used as a ruck-rover. He was a regular in the Norwood team during the 1970s and was a member of premierships in 1975 and 1978, the former as captain. In the 1978 SANFL Grand Final they had trailed Sturt by 29 points at three quarter time but came back to win, with Wynne kicking the goal which put them in front.

In 1985 and 1986, Wynne was coach of West Perth. In his first seasons with the recently christened "Falcons", a policy of developing youth saw the club play finals for only the second time since 1978, but with crippling injury problems West Perth failed in the first semi-final against the experienced Swan Districts, led by a devastating display from Garry Sidebottom. 1986 was disappointing, with the Falcons winning only nine games plus a draw, and Wynne was replaced by Bruce Monteath for the 1987 season.

He also appeared in twelve interstate matches during his career, four of them for Western Australia and the other eight for South Australia. Aside from representing Western Australia at the 1969 Adelaide Carnival and South Australia at the 1972 Perth Carnival, Wynne had earlier played for his country at International rules football in the Australian Football World Tour of 1968.
