= Kevin Hardiman =

Australian politician (1915–2002)

Personal information
- Full name: Kevin Philip Hardiman
- Born: 24 July 1915
- Died: 2 August 2002 (aged 87)
- Original team: Essendon High School Old Boys
- Height: 180 cm (5 ft 11 in)
- Weight: 83 kg (183 lb)
- Position: Centre half-forward

Playing career^{1}
| Years | Club | Games (Goals) |
| 1934–35, 1939 | Essendon | 18 (28) |
- ^{1} Playing statistics correct to the end of 1939.

Kevin Philip Hardiman (24 July 1915 – 2 August 2002) was an Australian rules footballer who played for Essendon in the Victorian Football League (VFL). He was also an athletics coach and Labor Party politician.

Kevin concluded his teaching career at Reservoir High School, where he made a lasting difference in the lives of young men from diverse socio economic and family backgrounds. He was a valued and dedicated contributor to the northern suburbs community.

== Australian football ==
An Essendon local, Hardiman made his VFL debut in the 1934 VFL season but could only manage the one appearance that year due to a hamstring injury. The following season, after playing in just three games, he moved to South Australia for family reasons and represented the state at interstate football. A centre half forward and follower, Hardiman spent one further season at Essendon in 1939. He kicked 28 goals, the fourth most by an Essendon player that year, and contributed five goals in a win over Fitzroy at Brunswick Street Oval. Hardiman then returned to South Australia in 1940 and captain-coached Norwood in the SANFL. Perce McCallum was appointed coach in 1941 but Hardiman continued as captain and steered Norwood to a premiership in the league's last season before the war.

== After the war ==
During the war, he served with the Second Australian Imperial Force and relocated to Preston after he returned in 1947. He coached Preston Bullants reserves team in 1949 and 1950 before turning his attention to athletics. Hardiman was a coach with the Australian athletics team at the 1956 Summer Olympics in Melbourne.

== Politics ==
A member of the Australian Labor Party since the 1930s, the former footballer served as the mayor of Preston from 1967 to 1968 and the President of the ALP in Victoria from 1979 to 1981.
