= Syd Ackland =

Australian rules football player

Syd Ackland was an Australian rules footballer who played in the South Australian National Football League ('SANFL') for the Norwood Football Club from 1922 to 1931.
