= 1929 SANFL Grand Final =

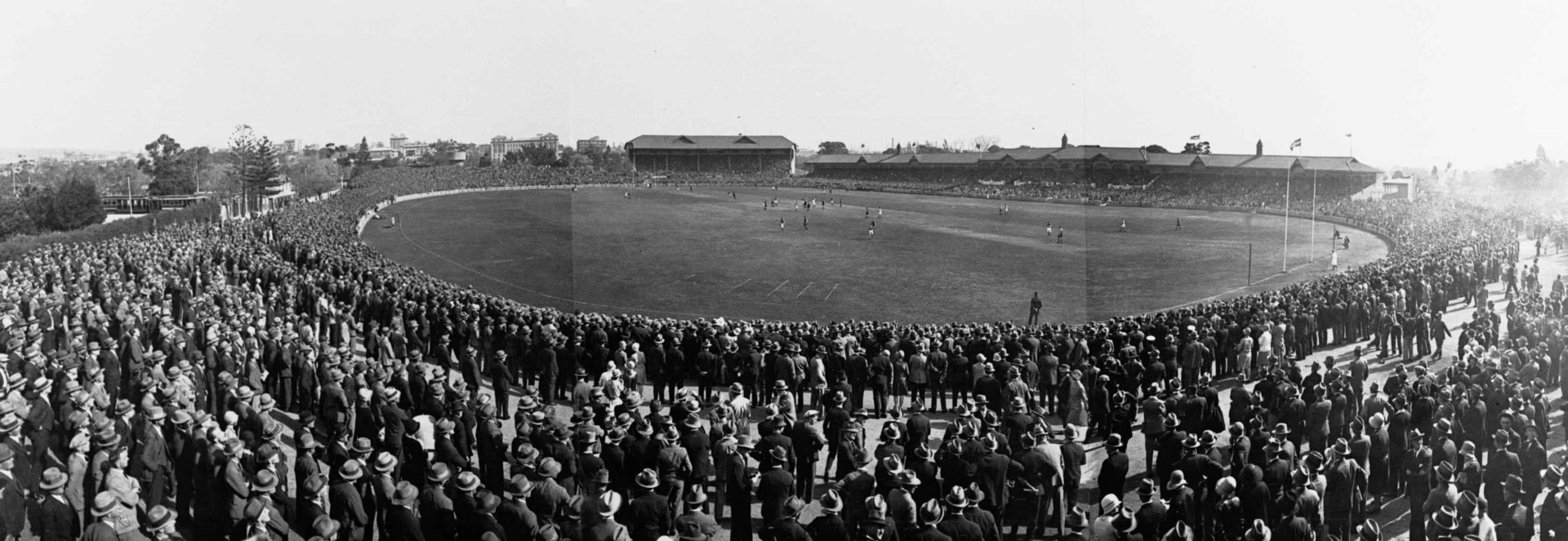

Port Adelaide	Norwood
10.9 (69)	16.14 (110)
	1	2	3	4
PTA	2.2 (14)	2.7 (19)	6.9 (45)	10.9 (69)
NOR	4.5 (29)	7.9 (51)	9.11 (65)	16.14 (110)
- Date: Saturday, 5 October (2:10 pm)
- Stadium: Adelaide Oval
- Attendance: 35,504

The 1929 SANFL Grand Final was an Australian rules football competition. Norwood beat Port Adelaide 110 to 69.
