= 1978 SANFL Grand Final =

| Sturt | Norwood |
|---|---|
| 14.26 (110) | 16.15 (111) |
| | 1 | 2 | 3 | 4 |
|---|---|---|---|---|
| STU | 5.9 (39) | 8.15 (61) | 12.21 (93) | 14.26 (110) |
| NOR | 1.5 (11) | 5.10 (40) | 9.10 (64) | 16.15 (111) |
- Date: Saturday, 2 September 30 (2:10 pm)
- Stadium: Football Park
- Attendance: 60,867

The 1978 SANFL Grand Final was an Australian rules football game contested between the Sturt Football Club and the Norwood Football Club, held at the Football Park in Adelaide on the 30 September 1978. It was the 57th annual Grand Final of the South Australian National Football League, staged to determine the premiers for the 1978 SANFL season, and attended by 60,867 ticketed spectators.

Sturt had only lost one game all season, were heavy favourites, and led by 29 points at three quarter time. However Norwood fought back and won by 1 point, marking the club's 24th premiership victory.
