= John Lill (cricketer) =

Australian cricketer

Personal information
- Full name: John Charles Lill
- Born: 7 December 1933 (age 92); Maylands, South Australia
- Batting: Right-handed
- Bowling: Right-arm medium
- Role: Batsman

Domestic team information
- Years: Team
- 1955/56–1965/66: South Australia

Career statistics
Competition	First-class
Matches	64
Runs scored	4,109
Batting average	36.36
100s/50s	8/20
Top score	176
Balls bowled	75
Wickets	1
Bowling average	47.00
5 wickets in innings	0
10 wickets in match	0
Best bowling	1/3
Catches/stumpings	55/0
- Source: CricketArchive, 8 October 2022

John Charles Lill (born 7 December 1933) is an Australian former first-class cricketer who represented South Australia. He was a member of the South Australian team which won the Sheffield Shield in 1963/64.

A right-handed top order batsman, Lill was good enough to tour New Zealand in 1959/60 with the Australian team. He played two matches against New Zealand but they weren't given Test status. This was because it was in effect a 'Second XI', with the first choice players given a rest after back to back tours of India and Pakistan. Lill fared poorly in his four innings, scoring 1, 15, 6 and 0.

Back home, Lill had his most prolific season in 1960/61 when he amassed 809 runs in all first-class fixtures, at an average of 42.57. His only first-class wicket was Victorian batsman Jack Potter, whom he dismissed for 156, caught by Barry Jarman in 1962.

Lill was also a talented footballer and played in the South Australian National Football League (SANFL) with Norwood. A centre half forward, Lill was Norwood's top goal-kicker in 1961 and 1962, with 40 and 52 goals respectively. He was Norwood's best player in the heart breaking 5 point loss to North Adelaide in the 1960 SANFL Grand Final 1960 SANFL Grand Final scoring 4 goals from Centre Half Forward. He also participated in the famous 1961 'Bloodbath' Grand Final against West Adelaide. His father Alick Lill won a Magarey Medal during his time at Norwood.

In 1983 he was appointed as Secretary of the Melbourne Cricket Club and also was CEO. He remained in this role until 2000. Lill holds a Bachelor of Chemical Engineering from the University of Adelaide.
