= John Marriott (footballer) =

Australian rules footballer

Personal information
- Full name: John E. Marriott
- Born: Unknown; South Australia

Playing career^{1}
Years	Club	Games (Goals)
1947–1956	Norwood	176 (122)
- ^{1} Playing statistics correct to the end of 1956.

John Marriott is a former Australian rules footballer who played for Norwood in the SANFL. He was chosen as a ruckman in Norwood's official 'Team of the Century'.

Marriott first played with Norwood in 1947 and in just his second season won their best and fairest award. He won it again in 1951 and 1955, also winning the Magarey Medal in 1951 for being the league's best and fairest player. Marriott represented South Australia at interstate football 23 times during his career and won All Australian selection for his performance in the 1953 Adelaide Carnival. He was a member of Norwood premiership teams in 1948 and 1950 and captained the club from 1953 until his retirement at the end of the 1956 season. His retirement was due to his desire to concentrate on his dentistry and he finished with 176 games for Norwood.
