= Ron Kneebone =

Australian rules footballer

Ron George Kneebone

Personal information
- Born: March 18, 1937 (age 89); Maitland Hospital, South Australia

Playing career^{1}
| Years | Club | Games (Goals) |
| 1957–1967 | Norwood | 201 (86) |

Representative team honours
| Years | Team | Games (Goals) |
| | South Australia | 16 |
- ^{1} Playing statistics correct to the end of 1967.

Career highlights
- Magarey Medalist: 1966; South Australian Football Hall of Fame inductee

Ron Kneebone is a former Australian rules footballer who played with Norwood in the SANFL. He was named as a half back flanker in the official Norwood 'Team of the Century'.

Kneebone debuted for Norwood in 1957 and was initially used up forward. Strong overhead, Kneebone was later pushed into defence and it was as a full back that he won the 1966 Magarey Medal. It was his second last league season and in 1967 he retired having played 201 games with Norwood and 16 interstate matches for South Australia.
