= Harold Mudge =

Australian cricketer

Harold Mudge (14 February 1914 – 30 June 2006) was an Australian cricketer who played for New South Wales in the 1935/36 and 1936/37 and was then recruited by the cricket entrepreneur Sir Julien Cahn for his private cricket team, appearing for Cahn's teams in first-class and non-first-class matches in Sri Lanka, England, Scotland, Ireland and New Zealand, and once for Leicestershire. He returned to New South Wales for the 1939/40 season. He was born and died in Sydney.

Mudge was an all-rounder: he appeared in eighteen first-class matches as a righthanded batsman who bowled leg break and googly. He scored 1,060 runs with a highest score of 118 and took 25 wickets with a best performance of six for 42.

== See also ==
- List of New South Wales representative cricketers
