= Bill McCallum =

Australian rules footballer, born 1911

Personal information
- Full name: William Bramley McCallum
- Born: 10 October 1911

Playing career^{1}
Years	Club	Games (Goals)
1931–1941	Norwood	154 (137)
- ^{1} Playing statistics correct to the end of 1941.

William Bramley McCallum (born 10 October 1911, date of death unknown) was an Australian rules footballer who played with Norwood in the SANFL.

McCallum made his debut for Norwood in 1931 and went on to play 154 games for the club. Although he usually played as a centreman, he was also used up forward and in the ruck. He was twice a Best and Fairest winner with Norwood, a Magarey Medalist in 1936 and a South Australian interstate representative on 6 occasions. He played his last league season in 1941 and his last game was Norwood's Grand Final victory over Sturt.
