= Peter Dalwood =

Australian rules footballer

Personal information
- Full name: Peter Anstey Dalwood
- Born: 17 June 1922; Toorak Gardens, South Australia
- Died: 22 May 2000 (aged 77); South Australia
- Height: 193 cm (6 ft 4 in)
- Weight: 89 kg (196 lb)

Playing career^{1}
| Years | Club | Games (Goals) |
| 1945–54 | Norwood | 147 |
| 1945 | Fitzroy | 7 (12) |
- ^{1} Playing statistics correct to the end of 1954.

Peter Anstey Dalwood (17 June 1922 – 22 May 2000) was an Australian rules footballer who played for Norwood in the South Australian National Football League (SANFL) and Fitzroy in the Victorian Football League (VFL).

== Family ==
The son of Alfred Lionel Dalwood (1897-1991), and Lillian Jane Dalwood (1897-1984), née Anstey-Harris, Peter Anstey Dalwood was born at Toorak Gardens, South Australia on 17 June 1922. He had a brother, Paul Dalwood, and a sister, Ruth Carter (nee Dalwood).

He married Iris May Bell (1924-) in Adelaide on 19 January 1946.

His son Grant Dalwood (1956–2024) also played for Norwood.

== Education ==
He was educated at Adelaide's Prince Alfred College; and, while there, he excelled as a schoolboy cricketer, hurdler and track-and-field athlete, and footballer.

He went on to study at the University of Adelaide.

== Military service ==
He served in the Australian Army from October 1941 to April 1946.

== Football ==
On leaving Prince Alfred College, he played with the Adelaide University Football Club in the South Australian Amateur Football League (SAAFL).

While serving with the Australian Army, he played with the Windsor Football Club in the Brisbane-based Queensland Australian Football League (QAFL).

Dalwood, in his fourth VFL game, kicked seven goals to help Fitzroy defeat Collingwood. It was the highlight of his brief stint in the league.

In 1946 he returned to Norwood, with whom he kicked 70 goals for the year to top the SANFL goal-kicking. A key forward and ruckman, he was the leading goal-kicker at Norwood on a further two occasions. He was a six time South Australian interstate representative, for a return of 13 goals.

Under captain-coach Jack Oatey, Dalwood appeared in Norwood's 1946, 1948 and 1950 premiership teams. He kicked five goals in the 1946 Grand Final win over Port Adelaide.

== Death ==
He died in South Australia on 22 May 2000.
