= 1923 SAFL season =

1923 season of SANFL

1923 SAFL premiership season
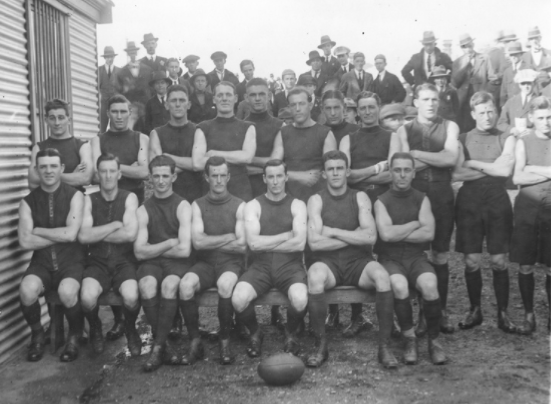
- 44th SAFL season Pictured above is the 1923 Norwood premiership team.
- Teams: 8
- Premiers: Norwood; 16th premiership
- Minor premiers: Norwood; 6th minor premiership
- Magarey Medallist: Horrie Riley; North Adelaide
- Leading goalkicker: Percy Lewis; North Adelaide (58 Goals)
- Matches played: 59
- Highest: 37,000 (Grand Final, Norwood vs. Sturt)

The 1923 South Australian Football League season was the 44th season of the top-level Australian rules football competition in South Australia. It saw Norwood repeat their 1922 premiership win, and again do so without the need for a challenge final. The Redlegs won their first eleven games before becoming stale in August, and then recovering to win their two finals despite being without suspended goalsneak Roy Bent.

North Adelaide's Percy Lewis kicked the second-highest goal aggregate in the League to this stage after "Bos" Daly's 1893 total, although 1923 ultimately proved the last season until 1953 when no player kicked ten or more goals in a match. West Adelaide, who rose in 1922 from five wins in two seasons to a Final, were affected by off-field turmoil that caused skipper Peters to not play, so that despite a remarkable debut by Bruce McGregor who played for the State after just three games, the Bloods fell out of the finals and would not return until 1927.

== Minor Round ==
=== Round 1 ===
	Round 1
Saturday, 5 May 1923	West Adelaide 7.14 (56)	def. by	West Torrens 8.10 (58)	Adelaide Oval
Saturday, 5 May 1923	Port Adelaide 10.15 (75)	def.	Glenelg 5.4 (34)	Alberton Oval
Saturday, 5 May 1923	Norwood 9.11 (65)	def.	Sturt 8.10 (58)	Norwood Oval
Saturday, 5 May 1923	North Adelaide 10.12 (72)	def.	South Adelaide 7.5 (47)	Prospect Oval

=== Round 2 ===
	Round 2
Saturday, 12 May 1923	South Adelaide 12.22 (94)	def.	Glenelg 4.10 (34)	Adelaide Oval
Saturday, 12 May 1923	Port Adelaide 7.17 (59)	def.	West Adelaide 5.8 (38)	Alberton Oval
Saturday, 12 May 1923	West Torrens 8.13 (61)	def. by	Norwood 16.9 (105)	Thebarton Oval
Saturday, 12 May 1923	Sturt 9.11 (65)	def. by	North Adelaide 11.12 (78)	Unley Oval

=== Round 3 ===
	Round 3
Saturday, 19 May 1923	West Adelaide 8.14 (62)	def. by	Sturt 15.8 (98)	Adelaide Oval
Saturday, 19 May 1923	Glenelg 6.7 (43)	def. by	North Adelaide 9.17 (71)	Glenelg Oval
Saturday, 19 May 1923	Norwood 12.16 (88)	def.	Port Adelaide 7.8 (50)	Norwood Oval
Saturday, 19 May 1923	West Torrens 8.7 (55)	def. by	South Adelaide 12.14 (86)	Thebarton Oval

=== Round 4 ===
	Round 4
Saturday, 26 May 1923	South Adelaide 8.9 (57)	def.	Sturt 8.6 (54)	Adelaide Oval
Saturday, 26 May 1923	Port Adelaide 9.9 (63)	def. by	West Torrens 9.13 (67)	Alberton Oval
Saturday, 26 May 1923	Glenelg 6.16 (52)	def. by	Norwood 14.18 (102)	Glenelg Oval
Saturday, 26 May 1923	North Adelaide 8.10 (58)	def. by	West Adelaide 9.12 (66)	Prospect Oval

=== Round 5 ===
	Round 5
Saturday, 2 June 1923	South Adelaide 14.12 (96)	def.	Port Adelaide 10.10 (70)	Adelaide Oval
Saturday, 2 June 1923	West Torrens 6.16 (52)	def. by	North Adelaide 7.15 (57)	Thebarton Oval
Saturday, 2 June 1923	Sturt 12.17 (89)	def.	Glenelg 3.14 (32)	Unley Oval
Monday, 4 June 1923	West Adelaide 4.17 (41)	def. by	Norwood 7.7 (49)	Adelaide Oval

=== Round 6 ===
	Round 6
Saturday, 16 June 1923	West Adelaide 8.19 (67)	def.	Glenelg 4.7 (31)	Adelaide Oval
Saturday, 16 June 1923	Norwood 8.12 (60)	def.	South Adelaide 6.8 (44)	Norwood Oval
Saturday, 16 June 1923	North Adelaide 14.16 (100)	def.	Port Adelaide 7.12 (54)	Prospect Oval
Saturday, 16 June 1923	West Torrens 9.9 (63)	def. by	Sturt 13.12 (90)	Thebarton Oval

=== Round 7 ===
	Round 7
Saturday, 23 June 1923	West Adelaide 10.9 (69)	def.	South Adelaide 5.7 (37)	Adelaide Oval
Saturday, 23 June 1923	North Adelaide 4.4 (28)	def. by	Norwood 6.5 (41)	Prospect Oval
Saturday, 23 June 1923	West Torrens 13.13 (91)	def.	Glenelg 7.7 (49)	Thebarton Oval
Saturday, 23 June 1923	Sturt 11.8 (74)	def.	Port Adelaide 8.7 (55)	Unley Oval

=== Round 8 ===
	Round 8
Saturday, 7 July 1923	South Adelaide 6.14 (50)	def.	North Adelaide 5.6 (36)	Adelaide Oval
Saturday, 7 July 1923	Glenelg 4.9 (33)	def. by	Port Adelaide 14.15 (99)	Glenelg Oval
Saturday, 7 July 1923	West Torrens 9.17 (71)	def.	West Adelaide 6.11 (47)	Thebarton Oval
Saturday, 7 July 1923	Sturt 6.11 (47)	def. by	Norwood 7.14 (56)	Unley Oval

=== Round 9 ===
	Round 9
Saturday, 14 July 1923	West Adelaide 8.13 (61)	def.	Port Adelaide 8.9 (57)	Adelaide Oval
Saturday, 14 July 1923	Glenelg 8.12 (60)	def. by	South Adelaide 17.13 (115)	Glenelg Oval
Saturday, 14 July 1923	Norwood 16.10 (106)	def.	West Torrens 6.14 (50)	Norwood Oval
Saturday, 14 July 1923	North Adelaide 5.9 (39)	def. by	Sturt 8.8 (56)	Prospect Oval

=== Round 10 ===
	Round 10
Saturday, 28 July 1923	Port Adelaide 7.20 (62)	def.	South Adelaide 6.10 (46)	Alberton Oval
Saturday, 28 July 1923	Glenelg 4.10 (34)	def. by	Sturt 10.12 (72)	Glenelg Oval
Saturday, 28 July 1923	Norwood 7.7 (49)	def.	West Adelaide 7.6 (48)	Norwood Oval
Saturday, 28 July 1923	North Adelaide 8.7 (55)	def. by	West Torrens 11.12 (78)	Prospect Oval

=== Round 11 ===
	Round 11
Saturday, 4 August 1923	West Adelaide 7.12 (54)	def.	North Adelaide 4.12 (36)	Adelaide Oval
Saturday, 4 August 1923	Norwood 8.23 (71)	def.	Glenelg 6.9 (45)	Norwood Oval
Saturday, 4 August 1923	West Torrens 7.10 (52)	def.	Port Adelaide 5.7 (37)	Thebarton Oval
Saturday, 4 August 1923	Sturt 12.11 (83)	def.	South Adelaide 7.11 (53)	Unley Oval

=== Round 12 ===
	Round 12
Saturday, 11 August 1923	South Adelaide 14.6 (90)	def. by	West Torrens 13.14 (92)	Adelaide Oval
Saturday, 11 August 1923	Port Adelaide 18.8 (116)	def.	Norwood 8.7 (55)	Alberton Oval
Saturday, 11 August 1923	North Adelaide 15.10 (100)	def.	Glenelg 6.10 (46)	Prospect Oval
Saturday, 11 August 1923	Sturt 11.16 (82)	def.	West Adelaide 6.8 (44)	Unley Oval
On the well-drained Alberton Oval, Port surprise a Norwood side seen as stale after their struggle against Glenelg the previous week, completely dominating after quarter-time.

=== Round 13 ===
	Round 13
Saturday, 25 August 1923	South Adelaide 14.15 (99)	def.	West Adelaide 7.14 (56)	Adelaide Oval
Saturday, 25 August 1923	Port Adelaide 9.6 (60)	def. by	Sturt 11.12 (78)	Alberton Oval
Saturday, 25 August 1923	Glenelg 6.5 (41)	def. by	West Torrens 16.21 (117)	Glenelg Oval
Saturday, 25 August 1923	Norwood 12.7 (79)	drew with	North Adelaide 10.19 (79)	Norwood Oval

=== Round 14 ===
	Round 14
Saturday, 8 September 1923	South Adelaide 12.10 (82)	def.	Norwood 10.14 (74)	Adelaide Oval
Saturday, 8 September 1923	Port Adelaide 7.12 (54)	def. by	North Adelaide 14.12 (96)	Alberton Oval
Saturday, 8 September 1923	Glenelg 9.6 (60)	def. by	West Adelaide 10.13 (73)	Glenelg Oval
Saturday, 8 September 1923	Sturt 11.19 (85)	def.	West Torrens 7.17 (59)	Norwood Oval
Norwood's leading goalkicker Bent would be suspended for six weeks for throwing the ball at boundary umpire Johnstone, but the suspension would be reduced to three weeks on protest the Monday following the First Semi-Final.

== Ladder ==
1923 SAFL Ladder
Pos	Team	Pld	W	L	D	PF	PA	PP	Pts
1	Norwood (P)	14	11	2	1	1000	801	55.52	23
2	Sturt	14	10	4	0	1031	757	57.66	20
3	South Adelaide	14	9	5	0	1002	871	53.50	18
4	North Adelaide	14	7	6	1	905	785	53.55	15
5	West Torrens	14	7	7	0	960	967	49.82	14
6	West Adelaide	14	6	8	0	782	844	48.09	12
7	Port Adelaide	14	5	9	0	911	918	49.81	10
8	Glenelg	14	0	14	0	594	1242	32.35	0

Rules for classification: 1) points; 2) percentage; 3) number of points for.
(P) Premiers

== Major Round ==
=== First Semi-Final ===
1923 SAFL First Semi-Final
Saturday, 15 September	Norwood	def.	South Adelaide	Adelaide Oval
1.3 (9); 2.7 (19); 4.10 (34); 8.10 (58)	Q1; Q2; Q3; Final	1.3 (9); 1.4 (10); 1.8 (14); 2.9 (21)	Umpires: Quinn
Wadham 2, Lee, Burns, B. A. Scott, Potts, Heinrichs, Grantley	Goals	C. Daly, Downs
Symonds, Stephens, Potts, White, W. Scott, Lill, Hepburn, Schumacher, Wadham	Best	Moriarty (best on ground), Moss, J. Handby, Downs, Caust, Waye
Despite the absence of Bent and the magnificent play of Dan Moriarty from centre half-back, Norwood completely outplay the blue and whites in what would prove South's last final for twelve years

=== Second Semi-Final ===
1923 SAFL Second Semi-Final
Saturday, 22 September	Sturt	def. by	North Adelaide	Adelaide Oval (crowd: 27,150)
1.3 (9); 4.6 (30); 5.6 (36); 6.9 (45)	Q1; Q2; Q3; Final	0.2 (2); 0.8 (8); 4.9 (33); 6.13 (49)	Umpires: Raven
Barron 2, Waters 2, Rocchi, Leak	Goals	Lewis 3, Thomas 2, Quigley
Golding, Lyne, Coloquhoun, Barron, Leak,	Best	Lewis, Thomas, Furler, Hyde, Dawe, Morris, Curnow, Sprigg
Keith Jackson (leg)	Injuries
North come back after being goalless at half-time on a ground from which water was pumped in the morning following recent flooding

=== Grand Final ===
1923 SAFL Final (Note: This is usually referred to as the "Grand Final", although the winner possessed a right to challenge if defeated)
Saturday, 29 September	Norwood	def.	North Adelaide	Adelaide Oval (crowd: 37,000)
4.3 (27); 6.8 (44); 7.9 (51); 9.12 (66)	Q1; Q2; Q3; Final	2.1 (13); 4.1 (25); 5.1 (31); 6.4 (40)	Umpires: Raven
Lee 3, Wadham 2, Burns 2, Hepburn, Mutton	Goals	Thomas, McDonald, Morris, Ween, Thompson, Davies
Schumacher, Lill, Symonds, W. Scott, Stephens, Potts, Hepburd, Wadham	Best	Burt, Thomas, Lewis, Conrad, Ween, Fuss, Davies, Sprigg
