= 1946 SANFL Grand Final =

Norwood	Port Adelaide
13.14 (92)	9.10 (64)
	1	2	3	4
NOR	4.5 (29)	6.9 (45)	9.10 (64)	13.14 (92)
PTA	0.4 (4)	2.7 (19)	4.10 (34)	9.10 (64)
- Date: Saturday, 5 October (2:10 pm)
- Stadium: Adelaide Oval
- Attendance: 53,473

The 1946 SANFL Grand Final was an Australian rules football championship game. Norwood beat Port Adelaide 92 to 64.
