= Alick Lill =

Australian rules footballer, born 1904

Personal information
- Full name: Alick Gladstone Lill
- Born: 10 May 1904; Stepney, South Australia
- Died: 31 December 1987 (aged 83)
- Original team: Marryatville

Playing career^{1}
Years	Club	Games (Goals)
1923–1931	Norwood	123 (9)

Representative team honours
Years	Team	Games (Goals)
	South Australia	20

Coaching career
Years	Club	Games (W–L–D)
1931, 1933–34	Norwood	
- ^{1} Playing statistics correct to the end of 1931.

Career highlights
- Magarey Medalist: 1925; South Australian Football Hall of Fame inductee

Alick Gladstone Lill (10 May 1904 – 31 December 1987) was an Australian rules footballer who played with Norwood in the SANFL.

== Football ==
Debuting in 1923, Lill was a tall centreman and was a member of three premiership sides at Norwood. He won the club's Best and Fairest award in 1924, 1925 and 1927. In 1925 he also won a Magarey Medal and from 1925 to 1930 he was a regular South Australian representative at interstate football, appearing in a total of 20 games. After 123 games for Norwood, Lill retired in 1931 due to constant knee injuries and later served as Norwood's coach for a brief period.

Lill's son John had a noted South Australian sporting career.

He worked at the state bank of South Australia, as a branch manager.

== See also ==
- 1927 Melbourne Carnival
