= 1978 SANFL season =

- Teams: 10
- Premiers: Norwood; 24th premiership
- Minor premiers: Sturt; 8th minor premiership
- Magarey Medallist: Kym Hodgeman; Glenelg (50 votes)
- Ken Farmer Medallist: Tim Evans; Port Adelaide (90 Goals)

Attendance
- Matches played: 116
- Total attendance: 1,048,871 (9,042 per match)
- Highest: 60,867 (Grand Final, Norwood vs. Sturt)

The 1978 South Australian National Football League season was the 99th season of the top-level Australian rules football competition in South Australia.

== Ladder ==
1978 SANFL Ladder
Pos	Team	Pld	W	L	D	PF	PA	PP	Pts
1	Sturt	22	21	1	0	2733	1734	61.18	42
2	Norwood (P)	22	15	7	0	2078	1636	55.95	30
3	Glenelg	22	14	8	0	2272	1959	53.70	28
4	Port Adelaide	22	14	8	0	2287	2055	52.67	28
5	West Torrens	22	10	12	0	2081	2123	49.50	20
6	Woodville	22	9	13	0	1981	2358	45.66	18
7	South Adelaide	22	8	13	1	1832	2057	47.11	17
8	Central District	22	8	14	0	1947	2386	44.93	16
9	West Adelaide	22	5	16	1	1839	2070	47.05	11
10	North Adelaide	22	5	17	0	2005	2677	42.82	10

Rules for classification: 1) points; 2) percentage; 3) number of points for.
(P) Premiers

== Finals Series ==
=== Grand Final ===
1978 SANFL Grand Final
Saturday 30 September (2:10 pm)	Sturt	def. by	Norwood	Football Park (crowd: 50,867)	Report
5.9 (39); 8.15 (63); 12.21 (93); 14.26 (110)	Q1; Q2; Q3; Final	1.5 (11); 5.10 (40); 9.10 (64); 16.15 (111)
Heinrich 3 Barton, Burgan, Davies, Graham, Winter 2 Bagshaw 1	Goals	5 Adamson; 3 Gallagher; 2 Turbill, Woodcock; 1 Adler, Craig, Taylor, Wynne
Burgan, Winter, Davies, Heinrich, Barton	Best	Adamson, Taylor, Craig, Button, Rosser, Nunan
