= Jace Bode =

Australian rules footballer (born 1987)

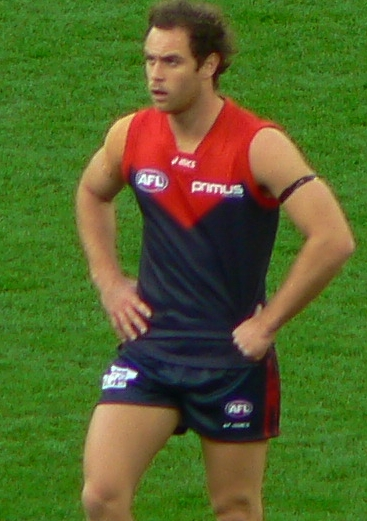

Personal information
- Born: 14 September 1987 (age 39); Adelaide, South Australia
- Original team: Sturt
- Draft: 9th overall, 2006 Rookie Draft
- Height: 186 cm (6 ft 1 in)
- Weight: 84 kg (185 lb)
- Positions: Midfielder, small forward

Playing career^{1}
Years	Club	Games (Goals)
2006–2008	Melbourne	9 (3)
- ^{1} Playing statistics correct to the end of 2008.

Career highlights
- 3x SANFL premiership player: 2012-2014

Jace Bode (born 14 September 1987) is an Australian rules footballer who played for Australian Football League (AFL) club Melbourne in 2007 and 2008. He was drafted from the Sturt Football Club, and later played for Norwood Football Club and the Port Adelaide Football Club in the South Australian National Football League (SANFL).

Bode grew up in Adelaide and attended Pulteney Grammar School, before changing to Pembroke for his final three years of high school, where he finished in 2005. He excelled at many sports at junior level as well as football, particularly cricket, athletics and basketball. As a fast bowler, he played at various representative levels until his focus turned to football. His background in athletics (particularly the 100 m, 200 m and 400 m sprints) saw him perform very well at the AFL Draft Camp. He is a natural left-footer and played senior football for Sturt in 2005 before being selected in the Under-18 All-Australian side, on the wing. He was taken at No. 9 in the 2006 AFL Rookie Draft, and made his debut in Round 19 of the 2007 season.

Bode broke into the Sandringham Zebras (Melbourne's VFL-affiliation side) first-team towards the end of 2006, playing five games. He suffered from a serious back injury in the early parts of 2007 but regained full fitness and was elevated from the rookie list before his debut in a resounding victory against the Western Bulldogs. Bode played in the last four matches of the 2007 season, kicking two goals in the final match of the season against Carlton. He was retained on the Melbourne list for 2008, and played in the Round 2 thrashing at the hands of the Bulldogs, and was dropped the following week. He did manage to break back into the starting side for the round 11, Queen's Birthday clash against Collingwood, where he played in front of a crowd of 60,000. He was delisted by Melbourne at the end of the 2008 season. Bode came back to Adelaide where he was put on the Sturt list for the 2009 season.

Bode played for Norwood in the SANFL. He is now a triple premiership player at the Redlegs after playing in the 2012, 2013 and 2014 grand finals with Norwood defeating West Adelaide, North Adelaide and Port Adelaide respectively. Named sole captain of the Norwood Football Club in 2017. Bode is the best 'short kick' in South Australia. Bode and close mate Callum 'the weapon' Bartlett are known as the basher brothers within the SANFL ranks.

Since 2020 Bode is now a senior player coach at Payneham Norwood Union Football Club a Division 1 side in the Adelaide Footy League. He joins former senior coach and Norwood legend Garry McIntosh. In 2021 he signed with Port Adelaide Football Club as a top up player in their SANFL side.

In November 2014 Bode married Natalie von Bertouch, a former Australia netball international. They have two daughters.
