= Kieran McGuinness =

Australian rules footballer (born 1983)

Personal information
- Born: 8 July 1983 (age 43)
- Original team: Wantirna South/Eastern Ranges
- Debut: 2002, Western Bulldogs vs. Essendon
- Height: 190 cm (6 ft 3 in)
- Weight: 88 kg (194 lb)

Playing career^{1}
Years	Club	Games (Goals)
2002–2006	Western Bulldogs	26 (7)
- ^{1} Playing statistics correct to the end of 2006.

Career highlights
- 2x SANFL premiership player: 2013, 2014; Norwood Football Club Best and Fairest: 2014

Kieran McGuinness (born 8 July 1983) is an Australian rules footballer who formerly played with the Western Bulldogs in the Australian Football League (AFL).

He was picked in the 2001 AFL draft at pick 42. He made a sensational debut in his first year, kicking four goals against Essendon, but had limited opportunities from then on, playing 23 senior games to the end of the 2005 season. He played in the Victorian Football League (VFL) grand final in 2005 for the Bulldogs VFL-affiliate Werribee. He was delisted at the end of 2006.

McGuinness then moved to Adelaide and played for Norwood in the South Australian National Football League (SANFL), where he wore number 13. In 2011 he won Norwood's Club Champion award with 69 votes. He was appointed captain in 2012 and missed the 2012 Grand Final due to a knee reconstruction sustained early in the season. He returned in 2013 and played in Norwood's 2013 Grand Final triumph against North Adelaide. In the 2014 SANFL season, McGuinness was part of another Norwood premiership team and won the club's best and fairest award.

McGuinness returned to Victoria in 2015, and joined the Northern Blues in the VFL. He spent two seasons with the Blues as a player and development coach, retiring at the end of 2016 after suffering cracked vertebrae in his neck in an onfield incident.
