= 1907 SAFL Grand Final =

Norwood	Port Adelaide
8.7 (55)	3.9 (27)
	1	2	3	4
NOR	1.3 (9)	2.6 (18)	7.7 (49)	8.7 (55)
PTA	2.3 (15)	3.4 (22)	3.5 (23)	3.9 (27)
- Date: Saturday, 21 September (2:10 pm)
- Stadium: Adelaide Oval
- Attendance: 25,000

The 1907 SAFL Grand Final was an Australian rules football game contested between the Norwood Football Club and the Port Adelaide Football Club, held at the Adelaide Oval in Adelaide on the 21 September 1907. It was the 12th annual Grand Final of the South Australian Football League, staged to determine the premiers for the 1907 SAFL season. The match, attended by 25,000 spectators, was won by Norwood by a margin of 28 points, marking the clubs fourteenth premiership victory.

The match was umpired by Victorian Football League umpire Arthur Norden, who notably collapsed and had to be taken from the field late in the third quarter; after a delay, boundary umpire G. Earle completed the game in Norden's place.
