= Walter Scott (Australian footballer) =

Australian rules footballer and coach

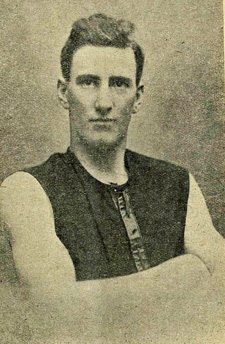

Personal information
- Born: 2 September 1899
- Died: 27 July 1989 (aged 89)
- Original team: Stirling
- Position: Centre half-back

Playing career^{1}
Years	Club	Games (Goals)
1920–1932	Norwood	174 (3)

Representative team honours
Years	Team	Games (Goals)
	South Australia	38

Coaching career
Years	Club	Games (W–L–D)
1926–1930, 1932	Norwood	109 (65–42–2)
1933–1935	West Adelaide	51 (13–37–1)
1936–1937	Glenelg	34 (7–26–1)
1938–1939	Sturt	34 (11–23–0)
- ^{1} Playing statistics correct to the end of 1932.

Career highlights
- Norwood premiership player 1922, 1923, 1925, 1930; Norwood best and fairest 1920, 1921, 1923, 1926, 1928, 1930; Norwood captain-coach 1926–1930; Magarey Medal 1921, 1924, 1930; South Australia captain 1930; Norwood Team of the Century (centre half-back); Australian Football Hall of Fame inductee 1996; South Australian Football Hall of Fame inductee 2002

Walter "Wacka" or "Wat" Scott (2 September 1899 – 27 July 1989) was an Australian rules footballer who represented Norwood in the South Australian National Football League (SANFL) during the early 20th century. Scott was a high marking defender who had a large influence during a very successful part of the Norwood Football Club's history.

== Early life ==
Scott was born in Stirling in the Adelaide Hills and played his early football with an inflated pig's bladder at school. He took his first job at the age of 13 as an apprentice electrician with the company Morrison and Gwynne. The three senior partners, J. Morrison, G. C. Gwynne and Algie Millhouse, all played for Norwood, and Millhouse had captained the club in 1914. Scott lived in the city during this time, but returned home during the weekends, during which he played for Stirling in the Hills Association until 1919.

== Football career ==
His high marking and sound defensive skills immediately drew praise and in his first season he won his new club's best and fairest award. He is considered the decisive factor raising Norwood from its bleakest era ever whereby they had won just fourteen games out of sixty between 1912 and 1919.

In his second season, he tied with Dan Moriarty of South Adelaide for the 1921 Magarey Medal. Under the rules that applied at that time, the Leagues umpires were called to deliberate and in the event chose to award the medal to Moriarty. Scott went on to win two Magarey Medals outright in 1924 and 1930. In 1998 the SANFL retrospectively awarded medals to all players who had tied for the medal but lost on a "countback" or by such adjudication. Thus some 76 years after the event (and posthumously) he acquired his third medal.

In 1922 Norwood won the premiership, the first for Scott. He played in three more premierships with Norwood, including as captain-coach of the 1929 team. He won Norwood's best and fairest award a record six times.

The pinnacle of Scott's playing career occurred in 1930 when he not only won the Magarey Medal, but also captained the South Australian side in that year's interstate carnival. Scott played 38 consecutive matches for his State, an Australian record that stands to this day. He also coached the State side four times.

He injured his knee severely in the last round match of the 1930 season against Port Adelaide, and he never reached such heights again as a player. He retired as a player in 1932.

Scott coached at four clubs altogether, his beloved Norwood, West Adelaide, Glenelg and Sturt over a total of twelve seasons.

Scott was named at centre half-back in Norwood's Team of the Century.

Scott was inducted into the Australian Football Hall of Fame in 1996 and into the SANFL Hall of Fame in its first year in 2002.

== See also ==
- 1927 Melbourne Carnival

== Bibliography ==
- Ross, John (1999). The Australian Football Hall of Fame. Australia: HarperCollinsPublishers. p. 119. ISBN 0-7322-6426-X.
