= 2014 Port Adelaide Football Club season =

Port Adelaide Football Club
2014 season
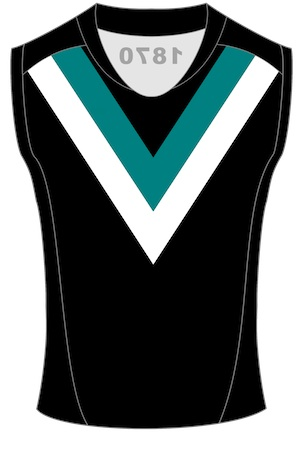
- Port Adelaide's home guernseys for the 2014 season
- President: David Koch
- Coach: Ken Hinkley (AFL); Garry Hocking (SANFL)
- Captains: T. Boak (AFL); S. Summerton (SANFL)
- Home ground: Adelaide Oval (AFL); Alberton Oval (SANFL)
- AFL season SANFL season: Preliminary Final; Grand Final
- Best and Fairest: AFL: Robbie Gray; SANFL: Steven Summerton
- Leading goalkicker: AFL: Jay Schulz (66 goals); SANFL: John Butcher (32 goals)
- Highest home attendance: 52,505 vs Carlton (22 August 2014)
- Lowest home attendance: 34,258 vs Western Bulldogs (21 June 2014)

The 2014 Port Adelaide Football Club season marked the club's 18th season in the Australian Football League (AFL) and 132nd season in the South Australian National Football League (SANFL).

The 2014 season was the first to feature the club's newly adopted unified club structure, whereby the club's AFL listed players were granted permission to play for the Port Adelaide reserves team in the SANFL, rather than be drafted to other SANFL clubs as in previous seasons.

The club's AFL team (seniors) is known as the Power, whilst its SANFL team (reserves) is known as the Magpies.

== Squad for 2014 ==
Statistics are correct as of end of 2014 season. Flags represent the state of origin, i.e. the state in which the player played his Under-18s football.

Senior List
No.	State	Player	Hgt (cm)	Wgt (kg)	Date of birth	Age (end 2014)	AFL Debut	Recruited from	Games (end 2014)	Goals (end 2014)
1	(Victoria (state))	Travis Boak (c)	183	83	1 August 1988	26	2007	Geelong (U18)	155	93
2	(South Australia)	Cameron Hitchcock	176	73	3 July 1990	24	2010	Glenelg	35	31
3	(Victoria (state))	Campbell Heath	187	75	1 April 1991	23	2010	Gippsland (U18)	193	52
5	(South Australia)	Matthew Broadbent	189	87	1 August 1990	24	2009	Woodville-West Torrens	104	40
6	(South Australia)	Angus Monfries	185	78	19 January 1987	27	2005	Sturt, Essendon	191	225
7	(South Australia)	Brad Ebert (vc)	189	88	2 April 1990	24	2008	Port Adelaide Magpies, West Coast	147	76
8	(South Australia)	Hamish Hartlett	178	76	29 December 1993	24	2013	West Adelaide	18	1
9	(Victoria (state))	Robbie Gray	183	84	30 March 1988	26	2007	Oakleigh (U18)	115	161
11	(Victoria (state))	John Butcher	197	94	3 July 1991	23	2011	Gippsland (U18)	23	33
12	(Victoria (state))	Jackson Trengove	197	94	2 November 1990	24	2010	Calder (U18)	98	8
13	(Victoria (state))	Cam O'Shea	193	91	13 March 1992	22	2011	Eastern (U18)	58	7
14	(South Australia)	Paul Stewart	191	90	10 July 1987	27	2008	Woodville-West Torrens	81	31
15	(Western Australia)	Lewis Stevenson	189	88	30 July 1989	25	2010	Claremont (WA), West Coast	182	64
16	(Victoria (state))	Ollie Wines	187	94	7 October 1994	20	2013	Bendigo (U18)	49	22
17	(Victoria (state))	Tom Clurey	193	89	23 March 1994	20	2014	Murray (U18)	1	0
18	(South Australia)	Kane Cornes	183	78	5 January 1983	31	2001	Glenelg	293	92
19	(Victoria (state))	Matthew White	180	82	15 April 1987	27	2006	Calder (U18), Richmond	127	79
20	(South Australia)	Chad Wingard	181	82	29 July 1993	21	2012	Sturt	67	95
21	(South Australia)	Jared Polec	188	81	12 October 1992	22	2011	Woodville-West Torrens, Brisbane Lions	40	26
22	(Western Australia)	Mason Shaw	197	92	15 January 1994	20	-	South Fremantle (WA)	0	0
23	(Victoria (state))	Matthew Lobbe	200	97	12 February 1989	22	2010	Eastern (U18)	67	16
24	(Victoria (state))	Jarman Impey	178	78	9 July 1995	19	2014	Murray (U18)	18	3
25	(Western Australia)	Domenic Cassisi	184	85	22 September 1982	32		East Fremantle (WA)	228	74
26	(Victoria (state))	Andrew Moore	189	87	30 May 1991	23	2010	Eastern (U18)	50	16
27	(Victoria (state))	Alipate Carlile	192	98	30 April 1987	27	2008	Murray (U18)	153	5
28	(South Australia)	Jay Schulz	193	94	18 April 1985	29	2003	Woodville-West Torrens, Richmond	167	279
29	(Victoria (state))	Jasper Pittard	186	83	1 April 1991	23	2011	Geelong (U18)	56	8
30	(South Australia)	Sam Colquhoun	179	75	20 December 1994	20	2013	Central District	10	2
31	(South Australia)	Mitch Harvey	196	100	17 August 1995	19	-	North Adelaide	0	0
32	(Northern Territory)	Jake Neade	170	67	29 May 1994	20	2013	Elliot (NT), North Ballarat U18	24	21
33	(Victoria (state))	Darcy Byrne-Jones	181	70	20 September 1995	19	-	Oakleigh (U18)	0	0
34	(South Australia)	Jarrad Redden	205	107	27 December 1990	24	2012	Woodville-West Torrens	15	3
36	(South Australia)	Jack Hombsch	193	89	7 March 1993	21	2012	Sturt, GWS Giants	39	0
38	(Western Australia)	Ben Newton	183	84	8 August 1992	22	2014	South Fremantle (WA)	4	0
39	(South Australia)	Justin Westhoff	199	94	1 October 1986	28	2007	Central District	159	204
40	(Victoria (state))	Aaron Young	188	81	6 December 1992	23	2012	Eastern (U18)	31	12
41	(Western Australia)	Brendon Ah Chee	188	84	21 December 1993	21	-	South Fremantle (WA)	0	0
42	(South Australia)	Tom Jonas	188	89	9 January 1991	23	2011	Norwood	56	1
43	(Victoria (state))	Karl Amon	181	71	19 August 1995	19	-	Sandringham (U18)	0	0
44	(Northern Territory)	Tom Logan	183	80	2 July 1985	29	2005	Waratah (NT), Brisbane Lions	117	27

Rookie List
No.	State	Player	Hgt (cm)	Wgt (kg)	Date of birth	Age (end 2014)	AFL Debut	Recruited from	Games (end 2014)	Goals (end 2014)
4	(Queensland)	Brent Renouf	200	102	3 May 1988	26	2008	Southport (QLD), Hawthorn	68	13
37	(Western Australia)	Kane Mitchell	174	74	1 December 1989	25	2013	Claremont (WA)	23	14
45	(Republic of Ireland)	Daniel Flynn	190	93	24 September 1994	20	-	Kildare, GAA	0	0
46	(South Australia)	Sam Gray	176	76	1 February 1992	22	2014	Port Adelaide Magpies	7	6
47	(Victoria (state))	Sam Russell	180	77	21 December 1995	19	-	Geelong (U18)	0	0

SANFL List:
Steven Summerton (Captain), Jake Johansen, Louis Sharrad, Angus Bruggemann
Ben Haren, Danny Butcher, Matt Venter, Nathan Krakouer, Ben Sawford, Henry Slattery
Sam Gordon, Anthony Biemans, Zac Hawkins, Robbie Young, Aseri Raikiwasa
* These players are only eligible to play for the SANFL reserves team and not for the AFL senior team

Coaching Staff:

- Ken Hinkley (Head Coach)
- Josh Carr (Midfield)
- Tyson Edwards (Forwards)
- Shaun Hart (Senior Assistant)
- Garry Hocking (SANFL coach)
- Matthew Nicks (Defence)
- Phil Walsh (Midfield Management)
- Stuart Cochrane (Player Development)
- Aaron Greaves (Development/Ruck Coach)

=== Squad changes ===
Ins

Player	Previous club	League	Via
Matthew White	Richmond	AFL	Free agent
Jared Polec	Brisbane Lions	AFL	Trade
Jarman Impey	Murray Bushrangers	TAC Cup	National Draft; Pick #21
Mitchell Harvey	North Adelaide	SANFL	National Draft; Pick #45
Darcy Byrne-Jones	Oakleigh Chargers	TAC Cup	National Draft; Pick #52
Karl Amon	Sandringham Dragons	TAC Cup	National Draft; Pick #68
Sam Russell	Geelong Falcons	TAC Cup	Rookie Draft; Pick #13
Sam Gray	Port Adelaide	SANFL	Rookie Draft; Pick #29
Brent Renouf	Port Adelaide Football Club (Re-draft)	AFL	Rookie Draft; Pick #44
Daniel Flynn	Kildare	GAA	Rookie Draft; Pick #54 (International rookie)

Outs

Player	New Club	League	Via
Brett Ebert			Retired
Nathan Blee	East Perth	WAFL	Delisted
Brent Renouf	Port Adelaide (Re-draft)	AFL	Delisted
Nick Salter	Ainslie	NEAFL	Delisted
Daniel Stewart	Norwood	EFL	Delisted
Matt Thomas	Richmond	AFL	Delisted
Danny Butcher	Port Adelaide	SANFL	Delisted (rookie list)
Justin Hoskin	Central Districts	SANFL	Delisted (rookie list)
Darren Pfeiffer	Redland	NEAFL	Delisted (rookie list)

== AFL season summary ==
=== Pre-season matches ===
Port Adelaide's 2014 NAB Challenge fixtures
Date and local time	Opponent	Scores^{[a]}			Venue	Attendance	Ref
Date and local time	Opponent	Home	Away	Result	Venue	Attendance	Ref
Sunday, 16 February (4:10 pm)	Adelaide	0.18.11 (119)	0.9.5 (59)	Lost by 60 points	Richmond Oval [A]	8,765	
Tuesday, 25 February (7:10 pm)	Essendon	0.9.11 (65)	1.11.15 (90)	Won by 25 points	Etihad Stadium [A]	8,022	

Port Adelaide's 2014 practice matches
Date and local time	Opponent	Scores^{[a]}			Venue	Attendance	Ref
Date and local time	Opponent	Home	Away	Result	Venue	Attendance	Ref
Saturday, 8 March (12:30 pm)	St Kilda	18.7 (115)	16.10 (106)	Won by 9 points	Alberton Oval [H]	6,000	

=== Premiership season matches ===
Port Adelaide's 2014 AFL season fixtures
Round	Date and local time	Opponent	Home	Away	Result	Venue	Attendance	Ladder position	Ref
Round	Date and local time	Opponent	Scores^{[a]}			Venue	Attendance	Ladder position	Ref
1	Sunday, 16 March (7:40 pm)	Carlton	12.15 (87)	18.12 (120)	Won by 33 points	Etihad Stadium [A]	24,460	7th	
2	Saturday, 29 March (4:40 pm)	Adelaide	19.13 (127)	11.7 (73)	Won by 54 points	Adelaide Oval [H]	50,397	3rd	
3	Sunday, 6 April (4:10 pm)	North Melbourne	14.13 (97)	13.12 (90)	Lost by 7 points	Etihad Stadium [A]	19,111	5th	
4	Saturday, 12 April (1:40 pm)	Brisbane Lions	24.15 (159)	7.4 (46)	Won by 113 points	Adelaide Oval [H]	36,231	3rd	
5	Saturday, 19 April (5:40 pm)	West Coast	7.14 (56)	10.10 (70)	Won by 14 points	Patersons Stadium [A]	35,366	2nd	
6	Sunday, 27 April (4:10 pm)	Geelong	16.11 (107)	9.13 (67)	Won by 40 points	Adelaide Oval [H]	47,007	1st	
7	Saturday, 3 May (2:10 pm)	Greater Western Sydney	15.7 (97)	20.12 (132)	Won by 35 points	StarTrack Oval [A]	6,549	2nd	
8	Saturday, 10 May (1:10 pm)	Fremantle	13.16 (94)	11.10 (76)	Won by 18 points	Adelaide Oval [H]	38,234	1st	
9	Bye							1st	
10	Saturday, 24 May (7:10 pm)	Hawthorn	15.10 (100)	13.8 (86)	Won by 14 points	Adelaide Oval [H]	52,233	1st	
11	Saturday, 31 May (1:10 pm)	Melbourne	11.9 (75)	14.11 (95)	Won by 20 points	Traeger Park [A]	5,655	1st	
12	Saturday, 7 June (4:10 pm)	St Kilda	19.15 (129)	9.5 (59)	Won by 70 points	Adelaide Oval [H]	43,374	1st	
13	Saturday, 14 June (2:10 pm)	Sydney	14.14 (98)	13.16 (94)	Lost by 4 points	SCG [A]	41,317	1st	
14	Saturday, 21 June (1:15 pm)	Western Bulldogs	19.14 (128)	8.8 (56)	Won by 72 points	Adelaide Oval [H]	34,258	1st	
15	Sunday, 29 June (3:40 pm)	Adelaide	14.15 (99)	10.16 (76)	Lost by 23 points	Adelaide Oval [A]	50,552	2nd	
16	Saturday, 5 July (7:10 pm)	Essendon	7.18 (60)	8.14 (62)	Lost by 2 points	Adelaide Oval [H]	46,786	3rd	
17	Sunday, 13 July (1:10 pm)	Richmond	19.12 (126)	16.10 (106)	Lost by 20 points	Etihad Stadium [A]	21,483	5th	
18	Sunday, 20 July (12:40 pm)	Melbourne	10.12 (72)	10.9 (69)	Won by 3 points	Adelaide Oval [H]	37,894	5th	
19	Sunday, 3 August (4:40 pm)	Collingwood	11.10 (76)	10.10 (70)	Lost by 6 points	MCG [A]	32,804	5th	
20	Saturday, 9 August (7:10 pm)	Sydney	7.16 (58)	12.12 (84)	Lost by 26 points	Adelaide Oval [H]	50,087	5th	
21	Saturday, 16 August (2:10 pm)	Gold Coast	7.5 (47)	7.14 (56)	Won by 9 points	Metricon Stadium [A]	10,042	5th	
22	Friday, 22 August (7:20 pm)	Carlton	20.20 (140)	5.7 (37)	Won by 103 points	Adelaide Oval [H]	52,505	5th	
23	Saturday, 30 August (1:10 pm)	Fremantle	16.9 (105)	14.13 (97)	Lost by 8 points	Patersons Stadium [A]	38,290	5th	

=== Ladder ===
2014 AFL ladder
Pos	Team	Pld	W	L	D	PF	PA	PP	Pts	
1	Sydney	22	17	5	0	2126	1488	142.9	68	Finals series
2	Hawthorn (P)	22	17	5	0	2458	1746	140.8	68	Finals series
3	Geelong	22	17	5	0	2033	1787	113.8	68	Finals series
4	Fremantle	22	16	6	0	2029	1556	130.4	64	Finals series
5	Port Adelaide	22	14	8	0	2180	1678	129.9	56	Finals series
6	North Melbourne	22	14	8	0	2026	1731	117.0	56	Finals series
7	Essendon	22	12	9	1	1828	1719	106.3	50	Finals series
8	Richmond	22	12	10	0	1887	1784	105.8	48	Finals series
9	West Coast	22	11	11	0	2045	1750	116.9	44	
10	Adelaide	22	11	11	0	2175	1907	114.1	44	
11	Collingwood	22	11	11	0	1766	1876	94.1	44	
12	Gold Coast	22	10	12	0	1917	2045	93.7	40	
13	Carlton	22	7	14	1	1891	2107	89.7	30	
14	Western Bulldogs	22	7	15	0	1784	2177	81.9	28	
15	Brisbane Lions	22	7	15	0	1532	2212	69.3	28	
16	Greater Western Sydney	22	6	16	0	1780	2320	76.7	24	
17	Melbourne	22	4	18	0	1336	1954	68.4	16	
18	St Kilda	22	4	18	0	1480	2436	60.8	16	

Source: AFL Tables
Rules for classification: 1) points; 2) percentage; 3) number of points for.
(P) Premiers

=== Finals series ===
Port Adelaide's 2014 AFL finals series fixture
Round	Date and local time	Opponent	Home	Away	Result	Venue	Attendance	Ref
Round	Date and local time	Opponent	Scores^{[a]}			Venue	Attendance	Ref
1st Elimination Final	Sunday, 7 September (2:50 pm)	Richmond	20.12 (132)	11.9 (75)	Won by 57 points	Adelaide Oval [H]	50,618	
1st Semi-final	Saturday, 13 September (5:45 pm)	Fremantle	11.17 (83)	15.15 (105)	Won by 22 points	Patersons Stadium [A]	42,388	
2nd Preliminary Final	Saturday, 20 September (4:45 pm)	Hawthorn	15.7 (97)	13.16 (94)	Lost by 3 points	MCG [A]	74,856	

== SANFL season summary ==
=== Premiership season matches ===
Port Adelaide's 2014 SANFL season fixtures
Round	Date and local time	Opponent	Home	Away	Result	Venue	Attendance	Ladder position	Ref
Round	Date and local time	Opponent	Scores^{[a]}			Venue	Attendance	Ladder position	Ref
1	Thursday, 3 April (7:10 pm)	Norwood	11.10 (76)	8.9 (57)	Lost by 19 points	Norwood Oval [A]	6,324	6th	
2	Sunday, 13 April (2:10 pm)	Glenelg	29.15 (189)	5.7 (37)	Won by 152 points	Alberton Oval [H]	2,738	4th	
3	Monday, 21 April (2:0 pm)	Woodville-West Torrens	8.3 (51)	15.19 (109)	Won by 58 points	Woodville Oval [A]	4,247	3rd	
4	Sunday, 26 April (2:10 pm)	West Adelaide	21.8 (134)	11.10 (76)	Won by 58 points	Alberton Oval [H]	2,585	2nd	
5	Sunday, 4 May (2:10 pm)	Adelaide	13.9 (87)	20.12 (132)	Won by 45 points	Clare Oval [A]	5,312	1st	
6	Sunday, 11 May (2:10 pm)	Sturt	19.12 (126)	11.10 (76)	Won by 50 points	Alberton Oval [H]	2,672	1st	
7	Saturday, 17 May (2:10 pm)	South Adelaide	18.14 (122)	10.2 (62)	Won by 60 points	Alberton Oval [H]	3,121	1st	
8	Saturday, 24 May (2:10 pm)	North Adelaide	9.9 (63)	12.17 (89)	Won by 26 points	Prospect Oval [A]	2,324	1st	
9	Sunday, 8 June (2:10 pm)	Central District	14.7 (91)	12.6 (78)	Won by 13 points	Alberton Oval [H]	3,059	1st	
10	Sunday, 15 June (1:10 pm)	Woodville-West Torrens	18.16 (124)	15.11 (101)	Won by 23 points	Alberton Oval [H]	2,393	1st	
11	Sunday, 22 June (2:10 pm)	West Adelaide	15.8 (98)	12.9 (81)	Lost by 17 points	Richmond Oval [A]	1,660	1st	
12	Saturday, 28 June (2:10 pm)	Sturt	8.15 (63)	12.11 (83)	Won by 20 points	Unley Oval [A]	2,561	1st	
13	Saturday, 12 July (2:10 pm)	North Adelaide	14.8 (92)	13.16 (94)	Lost by 2 points	Alberton Oval [H]	2,340	1st	
14	Saturday, 26 July (2:10 pm)	Adelaide	15.16 (106)	7.12 (54)	Won by 52 points	Alberton Oval [H]	6,196	1st	
15	Saturday, 2 August (2:10 pm)	South Adelaide	10.11 (71)	8.6 (54)	Lost by 17 points	Hickinbotham Oval [A]	1,692	1st	
16	Saturday, 9 August (7:10 pm)	Central District	16.8 (104)	15.11 (101)	Lost by 3 points	Elizabeth Oval [A]	2,139	1st	
17	Sunday, 16 August (2:10 pm)	Norwood	9.6 (60)	6.15 (51)	Won by 9 points	Alberton Oval [H]	4,199	1st	
18	Saturday, 23 August (2:10 pm)	Glenelg	13.14 (92)	8.12 (60)	Lost by 32 points	Glenelg Oval [A]	2,416	1st	

=== Ladder ===
2014 SANFL ladder
Pos	Team	Pld	W	L	D	PF	PA	PP	Pts
1	Port Adelaide	18	12	6	0	1810	1334	57.57	24
2	Norwood (P)	18	11	7	0	1446	1134	56.05	22
3	Sturt	18	11	7	0	1523	1276	54.41	22
4	South Adelaide	18	11	7	0	1517	1315	53.57	22
5	Woodville-West Torrens	18	10	8	0	1510	1499	50.18	20
6	North Adelaide	18	9	9	0	1581	1590	49.86	18
7	Central District	18	9	9	0	1277	1386	47.95	18
8	Adelaide	18	7	11	0	1479	1584	48.29	14
9	West Adelaide	18	6	12	0	1219	1528	44.38	12
10	Glenelg	18	4	14	0	1161	1877	38.22	8

Source: australianfootball.com
Rules for classification: 1) points; 2) percentage; 3) number of points for
(P) Premiers

=== Finals series ===
Port Adelaide's 2014 SANFL finals series fixture
Round	Date and local time	Opponent	Home	Away	Result	Venue	Attendance	Ref
Round	Date and local time	Opponent	Scores^{[a]}			Venue	Attendance	Ref
2nd Semi-final	Saturday, 6 September (5:40 pm)	Norwood	12.7 (79)	13.14 (92)	Lost by 13 points	Adelaide Oval [H]	13,431	
Preliminary Final	Sunday, 14 September (2:40 pm)	South Adelaide	13.12 (90)	10.10 (70)	Won by 20 points	Adelaide Oval [H]	8,079	
Grand Final	Sunday, 21 September (2:40 pm)	Norwood	12.10 (82)	11.12 (78)	Lost by 4 points	Adelaide Oval [A]	38,644	

== Notable events ==
- Port Adelaide wore a replica of its 2004 guernsey in Round 4 to commemorate its Grand Final victory over the Brisbane Lions from that year.
- Port Adelaide recorded the 44th SANFL minor premiership in club history, finishing the home and away season with 12 wins and 6 losses.

== Club awards ==
- To be revealed in October/November 2014

== Notes ==
Key

- H Home match.
- A Away match.

Notes

- **^{a}** Port Adelaide's scores are indicated in **bold** font.
