= 1924 SAFL season =

1924 SAFL premiership season
- Teams: 8
- Premiers: West Torrens; 1st premiership
- Minor premiers: West Torrens; 1st minor premiership
- Magarey Medallist: Wat Scott; Norwood
- Leading goalkicker: Roy Bent; Norwood (53 goals)
- Matches played: 60
- Highest: 44,345 (Grand Final, West Torrens vs Sturt)

The 1924 South Australian Football League season was the 45th season of the top-level Australian rules football competition in South Australia. The season saw West Torrens, who had not previously even played off for a premiership (Note: Up to 1930, a true grand final was only played if the minor premier lost either its semi-final or the final.) and had won only one previous final (Note: This was the semi-final against Port Adelaide in 1919. Torrens that year did tie the subsequent final with North Adelaide but lost the replay) win their first minor premiership and then first premiership in a challenge final against a Sturt side fully recovered from the internal turmoil that had affected their previous four seasons.

The 1924 SAFL grand final crowd of 44,345 was the largest football crowd in South Australia on record to that point and larger than any VFL crowd during 1924. However, the one off Dame Nellie Melba's Limbless Soldiers' Appeal match between VFL and VFA premiers Essendon and Footscray was slightly larger at 46,100.

== Minor Round ==
=== Round 1 ===
	Round 1
Saturday, 3 May 1924	South Adelaide 9.12 (66)	def.	Norwood 7.13 (55)	Adelaide Oval
Saturday, 3 May 1924	Glenelg 12.10 (82)	def. by	West Adelaide 13.12 (90)	Glenelg Oval
Saturday, 3 May 1924	North Adelaide 10.5 (65)	def.	Sturt 7.12 (54)	Prospect Oval
Saturday, 3 May 1924	West Torrens 13.16 (94)	def.	Port Adelaide 9.11 (65)	Thebarton Oval

=== Round 2 ===
	Round 2
Saturday, 10 May 1924	West Adelaide 8.17 (65)	def.	North Adelaide 7.9 (51)	Adelaide Oval
Saturday, 10 May 1924	Glenelg 7.12 (54)	def. by	Sturt 25.9 (159)	Glenelg Oval
Saturday, 10 May 1924	Norwood 7.15 (57)	def. by	Port Adelaide 9.12 (66)	Norwood Oval
Saturday, 10 May 1924	West Torrens 10.12 (72)	def.	South Adelaide 7.14 (56)	Thebarton Oval
Sturt's score was the highest and featured the greatest excess of goals over behinds since Port Adelaide kicked 29.12 (186) against West Adelaide in 1903

=== Round 3 ===
	Round 3
Saturday, 17 May 1924	South Adelaide 14.12 (96)	def.	Glenelg 4.9 (33)	Adelaide Oval
Saturday, 17 May 1924	Port Adelaide 10.8 (68)	def. by	Sturt 10.12 (72)	Alberton Oval
Saturday, 17 May 1924	Norwood 12.12 (84)	def.	West Adelaide 5.10 (40)	Norwood Oval
Saturday, 17 May 1924	North Adelaide 7.12 (54)	def. by	West Torrens 12.5 (77)	Prospect Oval

=== Round 4 ===
	Round 4
Saturday, 24 May 1924	West Adelaide 8.11 (59)	def. by	Sturt 11.12 (78)	Adelaide Oval
Saturday, 24 May 1924	Port Adelaide 14.18 (102)	def.	South Adelaide 7.9 (51)	Alberton Oval
Saturday, 24 May 1924	Glenelg 7.11 (53)	def. by	North Adelaide 8.15 (63)	Glenelg Oval
Saturday, 24 May 1924	Norwood 9.15 (69)	drew with	West Torrens 10.9 (69)	Norwood Oval

=== Round 5 ===
	Round 5
Saturday, 31 May 1924	South Adelaide 11.14 (80)	def.	West Adelaide 6.13 (49)	Adelaide Oval
Saturday, 31 May 1924	Port Adelaide 15.20 (110)	def.	Glenelg 10.8 (68)	Alberton Oval
Saturday, 31 May 1924	North Adelaide 9.16 (70)	def. by	Norwood 13.6 (84)	Prospect Oval
Saturday, 31 May 1924	West Torrens 7.7 (49)	def. by	Sturt 8.11 (59)	Thebarton Oval

=== Round 6 ===
	Round 6
Saturday, 7 June 1924	West Adelaide 10.8 (68)	def. by	Port Adelaide 10.10 (70)	Adelaide Oval
Saturday, 7 June 1924	West Torrens 13.22 (100)	def.	Glenelg 6.8 (44)	Thebarton Oval
Monday, 9 June 1924	South Adelaide 12.9 (81)	def.	North Adelaide 10.10 (70)	Adelaide Oval
Monday, 9 June 1924	Sturt 12.18 (90)	def.	Norwood 11.12 (78)	Unley Oval

=== Round 7 ===
	Round 7
Saturday, 14 June 1924	West Adelaide 11.10 (76)	def. by	West Torrens 13.16 (94)	Adelaide Oval
Saturday, 14 June 1924	Glenelg 10.11 (71)	def. by	Norwood 10.12 (72)	Glenelg Oval
Saturday, 14 June 1924	North Adelaide 4.10 (34)	def. by	Port Adelaide 13.19 (97)	Prospect Oval
Saturday, 14 June 1924	Sturt 17.8 (110)	def.	South Adelaide 7.11 (53)	Unley Oval
In its 49th League game, Glenelg narrowly fails to record its first victory, getting within the narrowest margin of reigning premiers Norwood after the wind carried a shot from Owens that looked to be going through wide.

=== Round 8 ===
	Round 8
Saturday, 21 June 1924	West Adelaide 12.14 (86)	def.	Glenelg 6.10 (46)	Adelaide Oval
Saturday, 21 June 1924	Port Adelaide 8.12 (60)	def. by	West Torrens 15.17 (107)	Alberton Oval
Saturday, 21 June 1924	Norwood 12.15 (87)	def.	South Adelaide 7.13 (55)	Norwood Oval
Saturday, 21 June 1924	Sturt 20.7 (127)	def.	North Adelaide 8.11 (59)	Unley Oval

=== Round 9 ===
	Round 9
Saturday, 28 June 1924	South Adelaide 10.12 (72)	def. by	West Torrens 14.15 (99)	Adelaide Oval
Saturday, 28 June 1924	Port Adelaide 10.18 (78)	def.	Norwood 10.10 (70)	Alberton Oval
Saturday, 28 June 1924	North Adelaide 10.14 (74)	def.	West Adelaide 7.11 (53)	Prospect Oval
Saturday, 28 June 1924	Sturt 16.20 (116)	def.	Glenelg 7.16 (58)	Unley Oval

=== Round 10 ===
	Round 10
Saturday, 5 July 1924	West Adelaide 5.11 (41)	def. by	Norwood 21.15 (141)	Adelaide Oval
Saturday, 5 July 1924	Glenelg 9.6 (60)	def. by	South Adelaide 11.17 (83)	Glenelg Oval
Saturday, 5 July 1924	West Torrens 10.11 (71)	def.	North Adelaide 7.13 (55)	Thebarton Oval
Saturday, 5 July 1924	Sturt 16.5 (101)	def.	Port Adelaide 10.12 (72)	Unley Oval
By losing to South Adelaide, Glenelg suffer their 52nd consecutive defeat since entering the SAFL, breaking the record of St Kilda (Note: The Saints lost their last three games in the 1896 VFA season and their first 48 VFL matches covering the entire 1897, 1898 and 1899 seasons.) and University (Note: University lost their last 51 matches from Round 4, 1912 to Round 18, 1914, following which they disbanded with the remaining players joining Melbourne.) for the most consecutive losses in a major Australian Rules league.

=== Round 11 ===
	Round 11
Saturday, 19 July 1924	South Adelaide 16.12 (108)	def.	West Adelaide 10.10 (70)	Adelaide Oval
Saturday, 19 July 1924	Glenelg 6.11 (47)	def. by	Port Adelaide 11.22 (88)	Glenelg Oval
Saturday, 19 July 1924	Norwood 14.13 (97)	def.	North Adelaide 8.12 (60)	Norwood Oval
Saturday, 19 July 1924	Sturt 10.13 (73)	def. by	West Torrens 15.8 (98)	Unley Oval

=== Round 12 ===
	Round 12
Saturday, 26 July 1924	Port Adelaide 13.14 (92)	def.	West Adelaide 6.7 (43)	Alberton Oval
Saturday, 26 July 1924	Glenelg 11.6 (72)	def. by	West Torrens 12.11 (83)	Glenelg Oval
Saturday, 26 July 1924	Norwood 14.11 (95)	def.	Sturt 5.14 (44)	Norwood Oval
Saturday, 26 July 1924	North Adelaide 7.11 (53)	def. by	South Adelaide 11.20 (86)	Prospect Oval

=== Round 13 ===
	Round 13
Saturday, 23 August 1924	South Adelaide 13.19 (97)	def.	Port Adelaide 13.13 (91)	Adelaide Oval
Saturday, 23 August 1924	North Adelaide 13.6 (84)	def.	Glenelg 6.16 (52)	Prospect Oval
Saturday, 23 August 1924	West Torrens 8.15 (63)	def. by	Norwood 11.12 (78)	Thebarton Oval
Saturday, 23 August 1924	Sturt 10.16 (76)	def.	West Adelaide 8.11 (59)	Unley Oval

=== Round 14 ===
	Round 14
Saturday, 30 August 1924	South Adelaide 17.6 (108)	def.	Sturt 13.12 (90)	Adelaide Oval
Saturday, 30 August 1924	Port Adelaide 14.20 (104)	def.	North Adelaide 8.8 (56)	Alberton Oval
Saturday, 30 August 1924	Norwood 19.18 (132)	def.	Glenelg 8.11 (59)	Norwood Oval
Saturday, 30 August 1924	West Torrens 16.17 (113)	def.	West Adelaide 7.8 (50)	Thebarton Oval

== Ladder ==
1924 SAFL Ladder
Pos	Team	Pld	W	L	D	PF	PA	PP	Pts
1	West Torrens (P)	14	11	2	1	1189	883	57.38	23
2	Sturt	14	10	4	0	1249	975	56.16	20
3	Norwood	14	9	4	1	1199	872	57.89	19
4	Port Adelaide	14	9	5	0	1163	965	54.65	18
5	South Adelaide	14	9	5	0	1092	1041	51.20	18
6	North Adelaide	14	4	10	0	848	1101	43.51	8
7	West Adelaide	14	3	11	0	849	1189	41.66	6
8	Glenelg	14	0	14	0	799	1362	36.97	0

Rules for classification: 1) points; 2) percentage; 3) number of points for.
(P) Premiers

== Finals series ==
=== First Semi-Final ===
	1924 SAFL First Semi-Final
Saturday 6 September	Norwood 15.13 (103)	def.	West Torrens 12.16 (88)	Adelaide Oval (crowd: 33,000)
Norwood's Roy Bent, with ten goals, sets a record for a SAFL Final. He remains one of only four players (Note: The others are: 1. Rick Davies, with 10 goals for Sturt against Norwood in the 1983 Preliminary Final; 2. Scott Hodges, with 13 goals for Port Adelaide against North Adelaide in the 1990 Preliminary Final; 3. John Fidge, with 11 goals for Glenelg against Woodville-West Torrens in the 1992 Preliminary Final) to kick ten or more goals in a SA(N)FL final.

=== Second Semi-Final ===
	1924 SAFL Second Semi-Final
Saturday, 13 September	Sturt 14.9 (93)	def.	Port Adelaide 9.5 (59)	Adelaide Oval (crowd: 27,000)
Stuart stage a remarkable comeback after the Magpies start the game with five unanswered goals in steady rain.

=== Preliminary Final ===
	1924 SAFL Final
Saturday, 20 September	Sturt 10.3 (63)	def.	Norwood 6.13 (49)	Adelaide Oval (crowd: 42,360)
This game set a record for attendance at a SAFL game – which would be broken the very next weekend – who paid £2,115.; Sturt's superb kicking for goal allowed it to win after trailing throughout the first half and end Norwood's hope of a hat-trick of premierships.

=== Grand Final ===
1924 SAFL Grand Final
Sunday 27 September	West Torrens	def.	Sturt	Adelaide Oval (crowd: 44,345)
3.3 (21); 5.7 (37); 7.11 (53); 9.12 (66)	Q1; Q2; Q3; Final	1.1 (7); 5.3 (30); 7.5 (47); 8.10 (58)	Umpires: Quinn
Hollis 3 Karney, Adams 2 Minear, Mills 1	Goals	3 Rily; 1 Barron, Scrutton, Donnelly, Lyne and Weller
