= 2021 SANFL season =

- Teams: 10
- Premiers: Woodville-West Torrens; 5th premiership
- Minor premiers: Glenelg; 7th minor premiership
- Magarey Medallist: James Tsitas; Eagles (21 votes), Bryce Gibbs; South (21 votes)
- Ken Farmer Medallist: Liam McBean; Glenelg (51 goals)
- Highest: 23,000 Grand Final - Eagles vs Glenelg at Adelaide Oval

The 2021 South Australian National Football League season (officially the SANFL Statewide Super League) was the 142nd season of the South Australian National Football League (SANFL), the highest-level Australian rules football competition in South Australia. The season commenced on 1 April and concluded with the Grand Final on 3 October. It was contested by 10 clubs, an increase of two on the previous season, due to the return of the Adelaide and Port Adelaide reserves teams.

== Fixtures ==
Four matches were played on Good Friday for the first time in a blockbuster start to the 2021 SANFL Statewide Super League.

Arch-rivals Norwood and Port Adelaide kicked the season off under lights in front of the Redlegs’ new Wolf Blass Community Centre at The Parade on Easter Thursday.

It loomed as a fascinating encounter before the remaining eight clubs collided on Friday 2 April in an historic occasion for the competition.

Reigning premier Woodville-West Torrens unfurled its 2020 premiership flag in front of its faithful against Sturt at Maughan Thiem Kia Oval while Glenelg hosted West Adelaide at ACH Group Stadium in the twilight timeslot of 4.10pm.

Central District defended its home turf against regular Good Friday combatant North Adelaide at X Convenience Oval while South Adelaide's star recruit Bryce Gibbs faced his former teammates against Adelaide at Flinders University Stadium.

== Premiership Season ==
=== Round 1 ===
	Round 1
Thursday 1 April (7:40 pm)	Norwood 14.13 (97)	def.	Port Adelaide 7.10 (52)	Coopers Stadium (crowd: 4,946)
Friday 2 April (1:10 pm)	South Adelaide 14.18 (102)	def.	Adelaide 6.5 (41)	Flinders University Stadium (crowd: 2,170)
Friday 2 April (2:10 pm)	Central District 15.9 (99)	def.	North Adelaide 14.6 (90)	X Convenience Oval
Friday 2 April (2:35 pm)	Woodville-West Torrens 13.16 (94)	def.	Sturt 7.6 (48)	Maughan Thiem Kia Oval (crowd: 2,959)
Friday 2 April (4:10 pm)	Glenelg 13.11 (89)	def.	West Adelaide 11.12 (78)	ACH Group Stadium (crowd: 3,606)

=== Round 2 ===
	Round 2
Saturday 10 April (2:10 pm)	North Adelaide 9.12 (66)	def. by	South Adelaide 11.11 (77)	Prospect Oval (crowd: 1,839)
Saturday 10 April (2:10 pm)	Port Adelaide 8.16 (64)	def.	Central District 7.5 (47)	Alberton Oval (crowd: 1,568)
Saturday 10 April (3:05 pm)	Sturt 6.9 (45)	def. by	Norwood 10.6 (66)	Unley Oval (crowd: 2,902)
Saturday 10 April (4:10 pm)	Glenelg 13.13 (91)	def.	Woodville-West Torrens 9.8 (62)	ACH Group Stadium (crowd: 2,056)
Saturday 10 April (4:10 pm)	West Adelaide 11.10 (76)	def. by	Adelaide 12.10 (82)	Hisense Stadium (crowd: 1,085)

=== Round 3 ===
	Round 3
Friday 16 April (7:40 pm)	Norwood 2.7 (19)	def. by	North Adelaide 16.15 (111)	Coopers Stadium (crowd: 3,479)
Saturday 17 April (2:40 pm)	South Adelaide 12.9 (81)	def.	Port Adelaide 10.12 (72)	Flinders University Stadium (crowd: 1,471)
Saturday 17 April (2:40 pm)	Sturt 12.21 (93)	def.	West Adelaide 6.7 (43)	Unley Oval (crowd: 2,629)
Saturday 17 April (2:40 pm)	Woodville-West Torrens 24.11 (155)	def.	Adelaide 11.6 (72)	Maughan Thiem Kia Oval (crowd: 1,673)
Saturday 17 April (2:40 pm)	Central District 5.12 (42)	def. by	Glenelg 10.16 (76)	X Convenience Oval (crowd: 1,545)

=== Round 4 ===
	Round 4
Friday 23 April (7:40 pm)	West Adelaide 9.8 (62)	def.	Norwood 6.8 (44)	Hisense Stadium
Saturday 24 April (2:10 pm)	Central District 12.8 (80)	def. by	Adelaide 16.7 (103)	X Convenience Oval
Saturday 24 April (3:05 pm)	South Adelaide 11.15 (81)	def.	Sturt 6.6 (42)	Flinders University Stadium
Saturday 24 April (6:30 pm)	Glenelg 12.11 (83)	def.	Port Adelaide 10.13 (73)	ACH Group Stadium
Sunday 25 April (2:10 pm)	Woodville-West Torrens 9.7 (61)	def.	North Adelaide 9.4 (58)	Maughan Thiem Kia Oval

=== Round 5 ===
	Round 5
Friday 30 April (7:40 pm)	Norwood 7.9 (51)	def.	South Adelaide 6.6 (42)	Coopers Stadium
Saturday 1 May (1:10 pm)	North Adelaide 10.9 (69)	def. by	Glenelg 15.10 (100)	Prospect Oval
Saturday 1 May (2:10 pm)	West Adelaide 13.7 (85)	def.	Central District 8.13 (61)	Hisense Stadium
Sunday 2 May (12:10 pm)	Sturt 12.12 (84)	def.	Adelaide 13.5 (83)	Unley Oval (crowd: 2,339)
Sunday 2 May (2:10 pm)	Port Adelaide 16.11 (107)	def.	Woodville-West Torrens 7.5 (47)	Alberton Oval (crowd: 1,927)

=== Round 6 ===
	Round 6
Saturday 8 May (2:10 pm)	Central District 7.10 (52)	def. by	Norwood 13.6 (84)	X Convenience Oval (crowd: 1,411)
Saturday 8 May (2:10 pm)	Woodville-West Torrens 13.13 (91)	def. by	South Adelaide 15.9 (99)	Maughan Thiem Kia Oval
Saturday 8 May (4:05 pm)	Port Adelaide 13.9 (87)	def.	Adelaide 10.13 (73)	Adelaide Oval (crowd: 1,582)
Sunday 9 May (2:10 pm)	North Adelaide 19.7 (121)	def.	West Adelaide 8.5 (53)	Prospect Oval (crowd: 1,352)
Sunday 9 May (2:10 pm)	Glenelg 11.8 (74)	def.	Sturt 10.10 (70)	ACH Group Stadium (crowd: 2,415)

=== State Game ===
	2021 State Game
Saturday 15 May (3:35 pm)	SANFL 20.10 (130)	def.	WAFL 11.11 (77)	Adelaide Oval
Simpson Medal (WAFL): Jye Bolton (Claremont); Fos Williams Medal (SANFL): Matthew Broadbent (South Adelaide)

=== Round 7 ===
	Round 7
Saturday 22 May (2:30 pm)	Port Adelaide 13.8 (86)	def.	North Adelaide 11.12 (78)	Alberton Oval (crowd: 1,885)
Saturday 22 May (1:10 pm)	Sturt 11.9 (75)	def. by	Central District 12.13 (85)	Unley Oval (crowd: 2,468)
Saturday 22 May (1:10 pm)	West Adelaide 5.4 (34)	def. by	Woodville-West Torrens 21.8 (134)	Hisense Stadium (crowd: 1,267)
Saturday 22 May (1:35 pm)	Norwood 12.20 (92)	def.	Adelaide 6.8 (44)	Coopers Stadium (crowd: 1,929)
Sunday 23 May (2:10 pm)	South Adelaide 9.8 (62)	def. by	Glenelg 15.12 (102)	Flinders University Stadium (crowd: 2,473)

=== Round 8 ===
	Round 8
Saturday 29 May (2:10 pm)	Woodville-West Torrens 12.16 (88)	def.	Norwood 5.11 (41)	Maughan Thiem Kia Oval (crowd: 2,016)
Saturday 29 May (2:10 pm)	South Adelaide 17.10 (112)	def.	Central District 12.13 (85)	Flinders University Stadium (crowd: 1,215)
Saturday 29 May (2:35 pm)	Port Adelaide 12.9 (81)	def.	West Adelaide 8.4 (52)	Alberton Oval (crowd: 1,410)
Saturday 29 May (2:10 pm)	Glenelg 20.14 (134)	def.	Adelaide 6.9 (45)	ACH Group Stadium (crowd: 2,706)
Sunday 30 May (2:10 pm)	North Adelaide 7.10 (52)	def.	Sturt 7.7 (49)	Prospect Oval (crowd: 2,080)

=== Round 9 ===
	Round 9
Saturday 5 June (1:35 pm)	North Adelaide 13.7 (85)	def.	Adelaide 6.9 (45)	Prospect Oval
Saturday 5 June (2:10 pm)	Central District 7.15 (47)	def. by	Woodville-West Torrens 11.10 (76)	X Convenience Oval
Saturday 5 June (2:10 pm)	Norwood 9.13 (67)	def. by	Glenelg 10.8 (68)	Coopers Stadium
Saturday 5 June (2:10 pm)	West Adelaide 11.12 (78)	def. by	South Adelaide 12.9 (81)	Hisense Stadium
	Bye; Port Adelaide, Sturt

=== Round 10 ===
	Round 10
Saturday 12 June (2:35 pm)	Woodville-West Torrens 17.7 (109)	def.	Port Adelaide 6.5 (41)	Maughan Thiem Kia Oval (crowd: 2,482)
Sunday 13 June (2:35 pm)	Sturt 12.8 (80)	def. by	Adelaide 14.6 (90)	Unley Oval (crowd: 2,762)
Monday 14 June (2:10 pm)	South Adelaide 9.12 (66)	def. by	Norwood 11.9 (75)	Flinders University Stadium (crowd: 2,163)
Monday 14 June (2:10 pm)	Glenelg 16.9 (105)	def.	North Adelaide 12.10 (82)	ACH Group Stadium (crowd: 3,920)
	Bye; Central District, West Adelaide

=== Round 11 ===
	Round 11
Saturday 19 June (1:35 pm)	Central District 10.10 (70)	def.	West Adelaide 7.10 (52)	X Convenience Oval (crowd: 1,300)
Sunday 20 June (2:10 pm)	Port Adelaide 7.8 (50)	def. by	Sturt 14.7 (91)	Alberton Oval (crowd: 2,180)
	Bye; Adelaide, Glenelg, North Adelaide, Norwood, South Adelaide, Woodville-West Torrens

=== Round 12 ===
	Round 12
Saturday 26 June (1:25 pm)	North Adelaide 18.12 (120)	def.	Port Adelaide 6.8 (44)	Prospect Oval (crowd: 1,516)
Saturday 26 June (2:10 pm)	Sturt 8.7 (55)	def.	South Adelaide 5.14 (44)	Unley Oval (crowd: 1,960)
Saturday 26 June (2:10 pm)	Norwood 10.12 (72)	def.	Central District 5.12 (42)	Coopers Stadium (crowd: 1,977)
Saturday 26 June (2:10 pm)	West Adelaide 9.4 (58)	def. by	Adelaide 14.10 (94)	Hisense Stadium (crowd: 930)
Sunday 27 June (1:05 pm)	Woodville-West Torrens 8.8 (56)	def. by	Glenelg 6.7 (75)	Maughan Thiem Kia Oval

=== Round 13 ===
	Round 13
Friday 2 July (7:40 pm)	Norwood 3.7 (25)	def. by	Sturt 7.6 (48)	Coopers Stadium
Saturday 3 July (1:10 pm)	West Adelaide 7.7 (49)	def. by	North Adelaide 13.15 (93)	Hisense Stadium (crowd: 1,179)
Saturday 3 July (1:10 pm)	Glenelg 17.8 (110)	def.	Adelaide 14.11 (95)	ACH Group Stadium (crowd: 2,059)
Saturday 3 July (1:35 pm)	South Adelaide 6.9 (45)	def. by	Woodville-West Torrens 13.3 (81)	Flinders University Stadium (crowd: 1,152)
Saturday 3 July (2:10 pm)	Central District 6.12 (48)	def. by	Port Adelaide 9.3 (57)	X Convenience Oval (crowd: 1,687)

=== Round 14 ===
	Round 14
Saturday 10 July (2:10 pm)	Sturt 10.5 (65)	def. by	Glenelg 14.11 (95)	Unley Oval (crowd: 3,009)
Saturday 10 July (2:10 pm)	North Adelaide 21.5 (131)	def.	Central District 13.5 (83)	Prospect Oval (crowd: 2,012)
Saturday 10 July (2:10 pm)	Woodville-West Torrens 9.21 (75)	def.	West Adelaide 8.8 (56)	Maughan Thiem Kia Oval (crowd: 1,758)
Saturday 10 July (2:30 pm)	South Adelaide 12.15 (87)	def.	Adelaide 7.7 (70)	Victor Harbor Oval (crowd: 2,981)
Saturday 10 July (2:35 pm)	Port Adelaide 9.6 (60)	def. by	Norwood 14.12 (96)	Alberton Oval (crowd: 2,096)

=== Round 15 ===
	Round 15
Saturday 17 July (1:35 pm)	Glenelg 10.13 (73)	def.	South Adelaide 8.7 (55)	ACH Group Stadium (crowd: 1,953)
Saturday 17 July (2:10 pm)	Central District 3.5 (23)	def. by	Sturt 5.6 (36)	X Convenience Oval (crowd: 1,255)
Saturday 17 July (2:10 pm)	Norwood 7.3 (45)	def. by	Woodville-West Torrens 11.15 (81)	Coopers Stadium (crowd: 1,746)
Saturday 17 July (2:10 pm)	North Adelaide 14.11 (95)	def.	Adelaide 6.5 (41)	Prospect Oval (crowd: 1,449)
Sunday 18 July (1:10 pm)	West Adelaide 11.5 (71)	def. by	Port Adelaide 13.6 (84)	Hisense Stadium (crowd: 1,346)

=== Round 16 ===
	Round 16
Saturday 7 August (2:10 pm)	West Adelaide 0.6 (6)	def. by	Sturt 11.16 (82)	Hisense Stadium (crowd: 1,194)
Saturday 7 August (2:10 pm)	Central District 7.4 (46)	def. by	South Adelaide 14.14 (98)	X Convenience Oval (crowd: 920)
Saturday 7 August (2:10 pm)	Glenelg 11.9 (75)	def.	Norwood 8.17 (65)	ACH Group Stadium (crowd: 1,876)
Saturday 7 August (2:10 pm)	North Adelaide 10.7 (67)	def.	Woodville-West Torrens 7.7 (49)	Prospect Oval (crowd: 1,425)
Saturday 7 August (3:30 pm)	Adelaide 13.4 (82)	def.	Port Adelaide 10.9 (69)	Adelaide Oval
Round 16 was postponed following a COVID-19 outbreak in South Australia.; West Adelaide's score of 0.6 (6) was the lowest recorded by any team in an SANFL game since 1909, and the first goalless score since West Torrens kicked 0.8 (8) against South Adelaide on 17 May 1913.

=== Round 17 ===
	Round 17
Friday 13 August (7:40 pm)	Norwood 9.15 (69)	def.	West Adelaide 6.4 (40)	Coopers Stadium
Saturday 14 August (2:10 pm)	Glenelg 18.13 (121)	def.	Central District 10.7 (67)	ACH Group Stadium (crowd: 2,433)
Saturday 14 August (2:30 pm)	Sturt 14.12 (96)	def.	Port Adelaide 10.12 (72)	Unley Oval (crowd: 2,151)
Saturday 14 August (2:35 pm)	South Adelaide 8.6 (54)	def. by	North Adelaide 17.10 (112)	Flinders University Stadium (crowd: 1,265)
Sunday 15 August (2:10 pm)	Woodville-West Torrens 17.13 (115)	def.	Adelaide 8.2 (50)	Adelaide Oval (crowd: 3,899)

=== Round 18 ===
	Round 18 (Split Round)
Saturday 21 August (2:05 pm)	Port Adelaide 15.7 (97)	def.	South Adelaide 13.6 (84)	Alberton Oval
Saturday 21 August (2:10 pm)	Central District 11.9 (75)	def.	Adelaide 6.6 (42)	X Convenience Oval
Friday 27 August (7:40 pm)	West Adelaide 9.8 (62)	def. by	Glenelg 15.8 (98)	Hisense Stadium
Saturday 28 August (2:10 pm)	Sturt 9.8 (62)	def. by	Woodville-West Torrens 11.6 (72)	Unley Oval (crowd: 2,298)
Saturday 28 August (2:30 pm)	North Adelaide 10.13 (73)	def. by	Norwood 13.7 (85)	Prospect Oval (crowd: 2,675)

=== Round 19 ===
	Round 19
Saturday 4 September (1:10 pm)	Norwood 14.11 (95)	def.	Adelaide 7.10 (52)	Coopers Stadium (crowd: 2,166)
Friday 4 September (2:10 am)	Port Adelaide 11.8 (74)	def.	Glenelg 5.8 (38)	Alberton Oval (crowd: 2,370)
Saturday 4 September (2:10 pm)	South Adelaide 12.17 (89)	def.	West Adelaide 7.4 (46)	Flinders University Stadium (crowd: 1,699)
Saturday 4 September (2:10 pm)	Woodville-West Torrens 19.8 (122)	def.	Central District 2.6 (18)	Maughan Thiem Kia Oval (crowd: 1,167)
Saturday 4 September (2:35 pm)	Sturt 16.14 (110)	def.	North Adelaide 6.4 (40)	Unley Oval (crowd: 1,917)

== Ladder ==
Pos	Team	Pld	W	L	D	PF	PA	PP	Pts	Qualification
1	Glenelg	18	17	1	0	1607	1189	57.47	34	Finals series
2	Woodville-West Torrens (P)	18	13	5	0	1568	1056	59.76	26	Finals series
3	Norwood	18	11	7	0	1188	1101	51.90	22	Finals series
4	North Adelaide	18	10	8	0	1543	1209	56.07	20	Finals series
5	South Adelaide	18	10	8	0	1359	1283	51.44	20	Finals series
6	Sturt	18	9	9	0	1231	1095	52.92	18	
7	Port Adelaide	18	9	9	0	1270	1393	47.69	18	
8	Adelaide	18	5	13	0	1204	1679	41.76	10	
9	Central District	18	4	14	0	1070	1496	41.70	8	
10	West Adelaide	18	2	16	0	1001	1540	39.39	4	

Source: sanfl.com.au
Rules for classification: 1) points; 2) percentage; 3) number of points for.
(P) Premiers

== Finals series ==
=== Qualifying and Elimination Finals ===
	Elimination Final
Sunday 12 September (12:15 pm)	North Adelaide 8.10 (58)	def. by	South Adelaide 15.11 (101)	Adelaide Oval

	Qualifying Final
Sunday 12 September (3:15 pm)	Woodville-West Torrens 8.9 (57)	def.	Norwood 7.8 (50)	Adelaide Oval

=== Semi-finals ===
	First Semi-final
Saturday 18 September (3:15 pm)	Norwood 10.4 (64)	def. by	South Adelaide 12.11 (83)	Adelaide Oval (crowd: 10,104)

	Second Semi-final
Saturday 18 September (7:15 pm)	Glenelg 13.4 (82)	def. by	Woodville-West Torrens 13.8 (86)	Adelaide Oval (crowd: 10,104)

=== Preliminary final ===
	Preliminary Final
Friday 24 September (7:15 pm)	Glenelg 11.11 (77)	def.	South Adelaide 6.13 (49)	Adelaide Oval

=== Grand Final ===
	Grand Final
Sunday 3 October (3:30 pm)	Woodville-West Torrens 15.9 (99)	def.	Glenelg 4.8 (32)	Adelaide Oval (crowd: 22,956)

== Awards ==
=== Club best and fairest ===
Club	Award	Player	Ref.
Adelaide	State League Club Champion	Kieran Strachan	
Central District	Norm Russell Medal	Jarrod Schiller	
Glenelg	John H. Ellers Trophy	Matthew Snook & Luke Partington	
North Adelaide	Barrie Robran Club Champion	Campbell Combe	
Norwood	Michael Taylor Medal	Nikolaus Rokahr	
Port Adelaide	A.R. McLean Medal	Sam Hayes	
South Adelaide	Knuckey Cup	Bryce Gibbs	
Sturt	P. T. Morton Medal	Casey Voss	
West Adelaide	Neil Kerley Medal	Logan Hill & Thomas Keough	
Woodville-West Torrens	Perce Johns Medal	James Tsitas	

== See also ==
- 2021 SANFL Women's League season
