= Doug Long =

Doug Long may refer to:

- Doug Long (Australian footballer)
- Doug Long (American football)

== See also ==
- Douglas Long, American politician
