= 2021 SANFL Grand Final =

2021 Australian football match

Woodville-West Torrens	Glenelg
15.9 (99)	4.8 (32)
	1	2	3	4
WWT	5.2 (32)	6.2 (38)	10.5 (65)	15.9 (99)
GLE	2.2 (14)	2.3 (15)	3.4 (22)	4.8 (32)
- Date: 3 October, 3:30pm
- Stadium: Adelaide Oval
- Attendance: 22,956 (crowd numbers restricted due to Covid-19 Pandemic)
- Umpires: Bowen, Harris, Bryce

Accolades
- Jack Oatey Medallist: Jack Hayes

Broadcast in Australia
- Network: Seven Network

The 2021 South Australian National Football League (SANFL) grand final was an Australian rules football match that was played at Adelaide Oval on Sunday, 3 October to determine the premiers for the 2021 SANFL season.

The match was contested by Woodville-West Torrens and Glenelg. It was the first grand final meeting between the two clubs since the merger of the Woodville and West Torrens football clubs in 1991.

Woodville-West Torrens defeated Glenelg by 67 points. Whilst Glenelg kicked 2 out of the first 3 goals, Woodville-West Torrens kicked 14 out of the next 16 to run away with the premiership.

The win marked the 5th premiership for Woodville-West Torrens in their 30th year in the league, and the first time the club had ever gone back-to-back. The win also puts Woodville-West Torrens and Glenelg on the same amount of premiership victories - though Glenelg is 71 years older. With the loss, Glenelg also claims the worst Grand Final win ratio of any club with 26.32% having lost 14 out of their 19 Grand Final appearances.

Jack Hayes of Woodville-West Torrens was awarded the Jack Oatey Medal as the best player on ground.
