= 1973 SANFL Grand Final =

North Adelaide	Glenelg
19.16 (130)	21.11 (137)
	1	2	3	4
NA	7.6 (48)	8.10 (58)	14.14 (98)	19.16 (130)
GLE	4.3 (27)	9.10 (64)	16.10 (106)	21.11 (137)
- Date: Saturday, 29 September (2:10 pm)
- Stadium: Adelaide Oval
- Attendance: 56,525

The 1973 SANFL Grand Final was an Australian rules football game contested between the Glenelg Football Club and North Adelaide Football Club at Adelaide Oval on 29 September 1973. It was the 75th annual grand final of the South Australian National Football League (SANFL), staged to determine the premiers for the 1973 SANFL season. The match, attended by 56,525 spectators, was won by Glenelg by a margin of seven points, marking the club's second SANFL flag, breaking a 39-year premiership drought. It would be the last SANFL Grand Final held at Adelaide Oval until 2014.

Glenelg had been the top team all year, losing only one game all season (to North Adelaide in Round 7). In a tight grand final, Graham Cornes famously took a mark and kicked a goal to give Glenelg 1 point lead in the dying minutes, and then Glenelg kicked one more goal after the final siren.

== Teams ==
Glenelg
1. Peter Marker (C).

3. John MacFarlane

4. Bob Tregenza

5. Peter Carey

7. John Sandland

9. Greg Wickens

10. Rex Voigt

11. Greg Bennett

12. Graham Cornes

14. Brian Colbey

15. Peter Anderson

16. Steve Hywood

17. Kerry Hamilton

18. Craig Marriott

19. Fred Phillis

20. Wayne Phillis

21. Bob Tardiff

22. Neville Caldwell

26. Peter Millard

29. Jim Rawson

COACH: Neil Kerley

North Adelaide
1. John Spry

2. Terry von Bertouch

4. David Marsh

5. Charlie Payne

7. John Phillips

9. Barry Stringer

10. Barrie Robran (VC)

12. Neil Sachse

13. John Plummer

14. Barry Hearl

15. Alan Howard

16. John Robinson

18. Adrian Rebbeck

20. Rodney Robran

21. Terry Collins

26. Gary Sporn

28. David Burns

29. Bob Hammond

30. Dennis Sachse

35. Bronte Mumford

COACH: Mike Patterson

== Scorecard ==
1973 SANFL Grand Final
29 September 1973	Glenelg	def.	North Adelaide	Adelaide Oval (crowd: 56.525)
4.3 (27); 9.10 (64); 16.10 (106); 21.11 (137)	Q1; Q2; Q3; Final	7.6 (48); 8.10 (58); 14.14 (98); 19.16 (130)
Voigt 7 Carey 6 Sandland 4 Wickens, Bennett, Hamilton, Cornes 1	Goals	4 Rebbeck; 3 D.Sachse, R.Robran; 2 Marsh, Plummer, Von Bertouch, Payne; 1 B.Robran
Carey, Tregenza, Hamilton, Voigt, Bennett, W.Phillis	Best	Hammond, Marsh, Howard, Stringer, Sporn, Payne
