= 1971 SANFL season =

- Teams: 10
- Premiers: North Adelaide; 10th premiership
- Minor premiers: North Adelaide; 10th minor premiership
- Magarey Medallist: Russell Ebert; Port Adelaide
- Ken Farmer Medallist: Fred Phillis; Glenelg (99 Goals)

Attendance
- Matches played: 109
- Total attendance: 1,023,433 (9,389 per match)
- Highest: 52,228 (Grand Final, North Adelaide vs. Port Adelaide)

The 1971 South Australian National Football League season was the 92nd season of the top-level Australian rules football competition in South Australia.

== Ladder ==
1971 SANFL Ladder
Pos	Team	Pld	W	L	D	PF	PA	PP	Pts
1	North Adelaide (P)	21	17	4	0	2076	1645	55.79	34
2	Port Adelaide	21	16	5	0	2197	1594	57.95	32
3	Sturt	21	15	6	0	2080	1401	59.75	30
4	Central District	21	12	9	0	2151	1920	52.84	24
5	Norwood	21	10	11	0	2047	1962	51.06	20
6	Glenelg	21	9	12	0	2132	2030	51.23	18
7	West Torrens	21	8	13	0	1525	1767	46.32	16
8	West Adelaide	21	6	15	0	1698	2016	45.72	12
9	South Adelaide	21	6	15	0	1615	2078	43.73	12
10	Woodville	21	6	15	0	1596	2704	37.12	12

Rules for classification: 1) points; 2) percentage; 3) number of points for.
(P) Premiers

== Finals Series ==
=== Grand Final ===
1971 SANFL Grand Final
Saturday, 25 September (2:10 pm)	North Adelaide	def.	Port Adelaide	Adelaide Oval (crowd: 52,228)
4.6 (30); 6.11 (47); 9.18 (72); 10.19 (79)	Q1; Q2; Q3; Final	0.1 (1); 0.3 (3); 2.4 (16); 9.5 (59)
