= Peter Carey (Australian rules footballer) =

Australian rules footballer (born 1954)

Personal information
- Full name: Peter Gareth Carey
- Nickname: Super
- Born: 27 January 1954 (age 72)
- Height: 194 cm (6 ft 4 in)
- Weight: 95 kg (14 st 13 lb; 209 lb)
- Position: Ruckman

Playing career^{1}
Years	Club	Games (Goals)
1971–1988	Glenelg	448 (487) (Note: These tallies refer to premiership matches (home-and-away and finals matches) only.)

Representative team honours
Years	Team	Games (Goals)
	South Australia	19 (?)
- ^{1} Playing statistics correct to the end of 1988.

Career highlights
- 3×SANFL Premiership player: (1973, 1985, 1986); Glenelg captain: (1983–1988); 3×Glenelg Best & Fairest: (1975, 1979, 1981); Glenelg leading goalkicker: (1973); 2×All-Australian team: (1979, 1980); Fos Williams Medal: (1981 – SA v WA at Subiaco Oval); South Australian Football Hall of Fame, inducted 2002; Australian Football Hall of Fame, inducted 2009; Glenelg Football Club Hall of Fame member

Peter Gareth Carey OAM (born 27 January 1954) is a former Australian rules footballer who played for the Glenelg Football Club in the South Australian National Football League (SANFL) from 1971 to 1988.

Nicknamed "Super" and regarded as surprisingly agile for a player of his considerable size and a strong overhead mark, Carey began his career playing mainly as a forward, forming a memorable partnership with full-forward Fred Phillis, before moving into the ruck for the remainder of his career.

He is the current SANFL, South Australian elite football and Glenelg games record holder, and is the only SANFL or South Australian elite player to have played 400 premiership games or more.

Carey's total of 423 premiership games was the elite Australian rules football record until it was broken by Michael Tuck in the 1991 AFL Qualifying Final, and was also the record for most games played by an elite Australian rules footballer born in South Australia until it was broken by Craig Bradley in Round 2 of the 2001 AFL season. As of 2025, Carey ranks sixth behind Bradley (464), Shaun Burgoyne (433), Brent Harvey (432), Tuck (426) and Scott Pendlebury (425).

Carey also played 19 interstate football/State Of Origin matches for South Australia and 25 pre-season/night series matches for Glenelg (which are counted as senior by the SANFL but not the VFL/AFL). If these are included, Carey played a total of 467 career senior games, which was an elite Australian rules football record until broken by Bradley in either of Round 11 of 2001 (using the VFL/AFL's total) or Round 11 of 2000 (using Bradley's overall total).

As of 2025, Carey's total of 467 remains a South Australian elite football record, and depending on the viewpoint taken, Carey ranks either second in elite Australian rules football behind Bradley (who played 501 career senior games using the VFL/AFL's total), or fourth behind Bradley (528 using his overall total), Harvey (491), and Burgoyne (468).

A member of both the South Australian and Australian Football Hall of Fame, Carey was an integral part of the Glenelg team during one of its most successful (but frustrating) eras, playing in ten SANFL Grand finals for three premierships.

He is currently serving as Glenelg's club president, having taken over the role from fellow club legend Nick Chigwidden in October 2019.

== Playing career ==
Carey made his senior debut for Glenelg while still attending Seacombe High School, against Central District at Elizabeth Oval in Round 12 of the 1971 SANFL season. He played initially as a centre half forward and topped Glenelg’s goalkicking in 1973 with 70 goals, including an amazing eleven in a score of 33.20 (218) against grand final opponent North Adelaide, and six in the Grand Final win over the Roosters. He was to kick 487 goals in his career, including eight in the club’s amazing score of 49.23 (317) against Central District two years later. By this time, Carey had moved into the ruck, where he was to play the remainder of his career and help give the Tigers’ small men first use of the ball with his tremendous body strength. He won Glenelg’s Best and Fairest award in 1975, 1979 and 1981 and was club captain from 1983 until 1988, including back to back premierships in 1985 and 1986.

In 1981 he won the first ever Fos Williams Medal and for his performances with South Australia he also earned All Australian selection in both 1979 and 1980.

Carey was again among his side's best players during Glenelg's gruelling 1982 finals series, which eventually saw the Tigers fall at the last hurdle for the second consecutive season. His efforts were all the more admirable considering he had to play three of the finals under the duress of a groin injury which hampered his mobility and forced him to either kick mainly with his non-preferred left foot or handpass to nearby teammates. In the Elimination final against Central District, he was rated among Glenelg's best, taking strong marks around the ground and rucking well, as well as regularly rotating between ruck and full-forward duties with Stephen Kernahan. He suffered the groin injury during the magnificent First Semi-final victory over Sturt and struggled through the rest of the game. The extent of Carey's injury became clear the following week in the first quarter of the Preliminary final against Port Adelaide, when an awkward 35-metre set shot hit the behind post. Despite this, he still managed to exert such an influence on the rest of the game, especially when Port came back hard in the second half, to be rated best on ground in the one-point victory. Carey underwent intensive treatment during the week, but was still not fully fit when he ran out for his sixth SANFL Grand final. In the defeat to Norwood, Carey laboured manfully and was again named among Glenelg's best, even while still restricted by the groin injury. The one time he did try and kick a goal with his right foot, from a set shot late in the third quarter, the ball hit the post. At the time Glenelg trailed by 19 points, and that would be as close as they came for the rest of the match. Carey eventually did kick a goal in the last quarter, but by that time the game was over as a contest.

== Life after Retirement ==
Carey was awarded the Medal of the Order of Australia in the 1989 Australia Day Honours for "service to Australian football".

In 2001, Carey was named among the 25 inaugural members of Glenelg's club Hall of Fame. He also gained recognition as one of the 'Greats of Glenelg'.

In 2002, Carey was an inaugural member of the South Australian Football Hall of Fame.

In 2008, Carey was appointed a Commissioner on the South Australian Football Commission at the SANFL's AGM, replacing one of his former coaches John Halbert.

In 2009, Carey's feats achieved national recognition when was inducted into the Australian Football Hall of Fame.

== See also ==
- 1977 SANFL Grand Final
