= Fred Phillis =

Australian rules footballer (born 1948)

Personal information
- Full name: Dennis Keith Phillis
- Nickname: Fred
- Born: 9 September 1948 (age 78)
- Height: 187 cm (6 ft 2 in)
- Weight: 90 kg (198 lb)

Playing career^{1}
Years	Club	Games (Goals)
1966–1978, 1981	Glenelg (SANFL)	268 (836) (Note: These figures are for premiership (home-and-away and finals) matches only.)
- ^{1} Playing statistics correct to the end of 1981.

Career highlights
- SANFL Premiership player: (1973); 7x Glenelg Leading Goal Kicker 1968-72, 1975-76; 5x SANFL Leading Goal Kicker 1969-71, 1975-76; Magarey Medal: (1969); Kicked over 100 goals in four SANFL seasons 1969-70, 1975-76; 10 State Games for South Australia; Glenelg Hall of Fame, inducted 2001; South Australian Football Hall of Fame, inducted 2002; Glenelg Football Club Player Life Member; SANFL Player Life Member

Dennis Keith "Fred" Phillis (born 9 September 1948) is a former Australian rules footballer who played for the Glenelg Football Club in the South Australian National Football League (SANFL).

== Background ==
Born Dennis Keith Phillis, his schoolmates likened him to noted English Test cricket pace bowler Fred Trueman. He is almost exclusively known by his nickname.

Phillis is the brother of fellow Glenelg player and businessman Wayne Phillis.

== History ==
Phillis began his senior career with Glenelg in the SANFL in 1966 as a Centre half back under the coaching of Len Fitzgerald. He was soon moved to Centre half-forward and later Full-forward by incoming 1967 coach Neil Kerley. This lateral thinking paid off with Phillis kicking a then SANFL record of 137 goals in 1969.

He polled 18 votes in the 1969 Magarey Medal to be the first player to win the medal having played chiefly at full-forward for the season.

He played in Glenelg's 1973 Grand Final win over North Adelaide at the Adelaide Oval, and in losing Grand Finals for Glenelg against Sturt in 1969 and 1974, Norwood in 1975, and Port Adelaide in 1977 and 1981. Quirkily enough, in the 1973 grand final win by Glenelg over North Adelaide, he failed to kick a goal.

In perhaps Glenelg's most memorable non-finals game, Phillis scored 18 goals at Glenelg Oval in Round 18 of the 1975 SANFL season as part of the team's record-breaking 49.23 (317) to 11.13 (79) win over Central District, and kicked his 100th goal for the season during the match.

Phillis is the highest goal scorer in the history of the Glenelg club, having kicked 836 goals in his 268-game, 14-year career, an average of 59.8 goals per season and 3.12 goals per match. He also kicked 48 goals in twelve night series matches for Glenelg, bringing his overall total to 884 goals from 280 matches in Glenelg colours.

Impressive when considering that former league leading goal kickers Jack Owens (1927–1928, 1932) and Colin Churchett (1948–1951) are also Glenelg champions.

As of 2022, Phillis is third on the all time SANFL goal scoring list behind legendary North Adelaide full-forward Ken Farmer (1,417 from 1929–41), and Port Adelaide champion Tim Evans (992 from 1975–86): Owens sits 4th on the list with 827 goals, while Churchett is 15th with 555.

After retiring as a player, Phillis continued to pursue his chosen career as an architect.

== Bibliography ==
- Cornwall, Peter; Wood, John (2003). Pride of the Bay. Australia: Graphic Print Group. p. 379. ISBN 0-9750561-0-7.
