= 1934 SANFL Grand Final =

Port Adelaide	Glenelg
16.18 (114)	18.15 (123)
	1	2	3	4
PTA	3.4 (22)	6.13 (49)	11.17 (84)	16.18 (114)
GLE	5.4 (34)	10.8 (68)	15.10 (100)	18.15 (123)
- Date: Saturday, 5 October (2:10 pm)
- Stadium: Adelaide Oval
- Attendance: 30,045

The 1934 SANFL Grand Final was an Australian rules football competition. Glenelg beat Port Adelaide 123 to 114.
