= Jack Hayes (footballer, born 1996) =

Australian rules footballer

Personal information
- Full name: Jack Hayes
- Born: 6 March 1996 (age 30)
- Original team: Woodville-West Torrens
- Draft: 2022 Pre-Season Supplemental Selection
- Debut: Round 1, 2022, St Kilda vs. Collingwood, at Marvel Stadium
- Height: 193 cm (6 ft 4 in)
- Weight: 91 kg (201 lb)
- Positions: Ruckman, Forward

Club information
- Current club: St Kilda

Playing career
Years	Club	Games (Goals)
2022-2024	St Kilda	8 (9)

Career highlights
- SANFL Premiership Player: 2020, 2021; Jack Oatey Medal: 2021

Jack Hayes (born 6 March 1996) is a professional Australian rules footballer playing for the Woodville-West Torrens Football Club in the South Australian Football League (SANFL). He was drafted as a 26-year-old in the 2022 Pre-Season Supplemental Selection Period.

== Early life ==
Hayes is from South Australia and grew up supporting the Adelaide Crows. Hayes' brother Nick was a rookie-listed Brisbane Lions player from 2013-2014. Hayes played for South Australian side Woodville-West Torrens, winning the premiership in 2020. In 2021 Hayes captained the SA state team after being recognised as one of the most versatile and influential players in the SANFL, finished equal third in the Magarey Medal and won the Jack Oatey for best on ground in the grand final (polling 27 of a possible 27 votes) as Woodville-West Torrens claimed their second successive premiership. Hayes collected 26 disposals, nine marks, seven clearances, three tackles and a goal in the grand final win. Hayes also averaged just under 20 disposals, more than seven score involvements and a goal in the SANFL that season. Hayes also played alongside future St Kilda teammate Cooper Sharman. Hayes played over 100 games with the Eagles.

== AFL career ==
In December 2021, Hayes was invited to train with AFL side St Kilda. Hayes played the second half in a practice match against Carlton in February 2022, playing as a forward/ruck. Hayes was formally acquired by the Saints as a rookie on 2 March 2022 as part of the Pre-Season Supplemental Selection Period.

Hayes made his senior debut against Collingwood in the first round of the 2022 AFL season, being named one of the best on ground after kicking 3 goals.

== Statistics ==
Legend
G	Goals	K	Kicks	D	Disposals	T	Tackles
B	Behinds	H	Handballs	M	Marks	H/O	Hit-outs

Season	Team	No.	Games	Totals								Averages (per game)								Votes
Season	Team	No.	Games	G	B	K	H	D	M	T	H/O	G	B	K	H	D	M	T	H/O	Votes
2022	St Kilda	47	5	6	1	26	34	60	23	9	13	1.2	0.2	5.2	6.8	12.0	4.6	1.8	2.6	1
2023	St Kilda	18	1	1	0	2	6	8	4	2	3	1.0	0.0	2.0	6.0	8.0	4.0	2.0	3.0	0
2024	St Kilda	18	2	2	1	10	9	19	7	5	4	1.0	0.5	5.0	4.5	9.5	3.5	2.5	2.0	1
Career			8	9	2	38	49	87	34	16	20	1.1	0.3	4.8	6.1	10.9	4.3	2.0	2.5	2
