= Brett Backwell =

Australian rules footballer

Personal information
- Full name: Brett William Backwell
- Born: 18 May 1980 (age 46)
- Original team: Northern Eagles (QAFL)
- Debut: Round 1, 25 March 1999, Carlton vs. Essendon, at the MCG
- Height: 176 cm (5 ft 9 in)
- Weight: 74 kg (163 lb)

Playing career^{1}
Years	Club	Games (Goals)
1999–2001	Carlton (AFL)	18 (12)
2002	West Adelaide (SANFL)	
2003–2009	Glenelg (SANFL)	112 (97)
2009/10	Waratah (NTFL)	
2011–2012	North Adelaide (SANFL)	20 (10)
- ^{1} Playing statistics correct to the end of 2012.

Career highlights
- J. J. Liston Trophy: 2001; Magarey Medal: 2006; AFL Rising Star nominee: 1999

Brett William Backwell (born 18 May 1980) is a former Australian rules football player who achieved some international notoriety in 2005 when he had a finger amputated to enable him to continue his chosen sport. Backwell played for Carlton in the Australian Football League (AFL) from 1999 to 2001, and won the J. J. Liston Trophy in 2001 and the Magarey Medal in 2006.

== AFL career ==
Backwell played his junior football in Queensland. He was drafted to the elite AFL competition at number 67 selection in the 1998 AFL draft. His father Owen was a winner of the QAFL's Grogan Medal in 1971 and 1975.

Backwell debuted in the opening Round of the 1999 season. Played primarily as a small forward, he showed some opportunist play and in his 18 games managed a creditable 12 goals. He was nominated for the AFL Rising Star award.

He spent much of 2001 playing in Carlton's stand-alone reserves team in the Victorian Football League (VFL), where he won the J. J. Liston Trophy for best and fairest. He was delisted at the end of the 2001 season.

== SANFL career ==
Lured to South Australia by West Adelaide in an effort to rekindle his AFL career, Backwell quickly shone at this lower level of competition, finishing fourth in the Magarey Medal.

In 2003 Backwell moved to Glenelg, joining his former teammate from Carlton, Heath Culpitt. Selection in SANFL state teams followed 2003, 2005 and 2006, including the 2003 win over Western Australia, earning him the Fos Williams Medal for a best-on-ground performance.

In 2006 Backwell won the highest individual award in the league, the Magarey Medal, a feat heightened after he elected to have a finger amputated twelve months earlier. In post-award interviews he said he has not given up hope of again playing in the AFL, and hoped his Magarey win would spark interest from other clubs, but this did not eventuate and he continued to play with Glenelg until 2009.

Backwell spent the 2009/10 summer playing in the Northern Territory Football League for Waratah; as a result of playing for Waratah instead of participating in Glenelg's preseason, Backwell was sacked by his SANFL club. After sitting out the 2010 SANFL season, he returned in 2011 for North Adelaide, and played there until his retirement from the SANFL in June 2012. He played out the season in the Southern Football League for Morphettville Park.

Backwell served as a midfield assistant coach for South Adelaide from 2013 until 2014, before resigning.

He later became coach of Prince Alfred Old Collegians, taking them to the Division One minor premiership in the Adelaide Football League.

== Finger amputation ==
In 2005 Backwell enjoyed a brief period of international celebrity status when he elected to have his left-ring finger amputated. The finger had caused him constant pain and restricted movement since injuring it in 2002. Surgeons offered him the option of fusing the bones in his finger, but he declined this as it would not have allowed him to continue playing. After having the finger chopped off, he was flown to the United States to appear on the 22 September episode of the Late Show with David Letterman. He continued to play football without any complications from only having nine fingers.

== External sources ==
- Brett Backwell at AustralianFootball.com
- Brett Backwell's playing statistics from AFL Tables
- Brett Backwell's profile at Blueseum
- ABC Sport Australian Broadcasting Commission article about the finger amputation
- SANFL News article on transfer to Glenelg
- FootySA summary of V/AFL career
