= Douglas Long =

American politician

Member of New Hampshire House of Representatives for Merrimack 4
- In office December 3, 2014 – December 4, 2018
- Succeeded by: Tom Schamberg

Personal details
- Party: Republican

Douglas Long is an American politician. He was a member of the New Hampshire House of Representatives and represented Merrimack 4th district.
