= 2021 SANFL Women's League season =

2021 SANFL Women's season
- Teams: 8
- Premiers: Glenelg; 1st premiership
- Minor premiers: Norwood; 2nd minor premiership
- Best and fairest: Lauren Young; West Adelaide (18 votes)
- Leading goalkicker: Chantel Reynolds; Central District (14 goals)

The 2021 SANFL Women's League season was the fifth season of the SANFL Women's League (SANFLW). The season commenced on 26 February and concluded with the Grand Final on 5 June. The competition is contested by eight clubs, all of whom are affiliated with clubs from the men's South Australian National Football League (SANFL).

== Clubs ==
- Central District, Glenelg, North Adelaide, Norwood
- South Adelaide, Sturt, West Adelaide, Woodville-West Torrens

== Ladder ==
Pos	Team	Pld	W	L	D	PF	PA	PP	Pts	Qualification
1	Norwood	11	9	2	0	377	237	61.40	18	Finals series
2	Glenelg (P)	11	7	3	1	379	261	59.22	15	Finals series
3	West Adelaide	11	6	5	0	360	352	50.56	12	Finals series
4	South Adelaide	11	5	5	1	304	309	49.59	11	Finals series
5	North Adelaide	11	5	5	1	263	290	47.56	11	
6	Central District	11	4	7	0	385	337	53.32	8	
7	Sturt	11	3	7	1	311	343	47.55	7	
8	Woodville-West Torrens	11	3	8	0	205	455	31.06	6	

Source: sanfl.com.au
Rules for classification: 1) points; 2) percentage; 3) number of points for.
(P) Premiers

== Finals series ==
=== First semi-final ===
	First Semi Final
Saturday 22 May (6:35 pm)	West Adelaide 4.5 (29)	def.	South Adelaide 3.7 (25)	Coopers Stadium	Report

=== Second semi-final ===
	Second Semi Final
Saturday 22 May (4:45 pm)	Norwood 1.2 (8)	def. by	Glenelg 4.7 (31)	Coopers Stadium	Report

=== Preliminary final ===
	Preliminary Final
Saturday 29 May (11:30 am)	Norwood 2.4 (16)	def. by	West Adelaide 6.4 (30)	Coopers Stadium	Report

=== Grand Final ===
2021 SANFLW Grand Final
Saturday 5 June (12:40 pm)	Glenelg	def.	West Adelaide	Thebarton Oval
2.1 (13); 4.2 (26); 4.5 (29); 5.10 (40)	Q1; Q2; Q3; Final	0.1 (1); 2.2 (14); 2.5 (17); 2.5 (17)	Umpires: Brittain, Lodge, Hetherington; Best on ground: Ebony Marinoff Glenelg; Television broadcast: SANFL.com.au
E. Marinoff 2, J. Searle 2 J, Bates 1	Goals	C. Biddell 1, S. Dargan 1
E. Marinoff, C. Gould, E. Kellock, B. Tonon, P. Window, J. Searle, S. Howell	Best	Z. Venning, S. Whiting, N. Davis, A. Ballard, C. Biddell, S. Dargan
Glenelg won their first senior women's premiership.

== Awards ==
- SANFL Women's Best and Fairest

Lauren Young – 18 votes (West Adelaide)

- Coaches Award

Lauren Young – 52 votes (West Adelaide)

- Leading Goal Kicker Award

Chantel Reynolds – 14 goals (Central District)

- Leadership Award

Maya Rigter (Sturt)
