= Colin Churchett =

Australian rules footballer

Personal information
- Full name: Colin J. Churchett
- Born: 30 January 1926
- Died: 5 February 2012 (aged 86)
- Height: 180 cm (5 ft 11 in)
- Weight: 74 kg (163 lb)
- Position: Full-forward

Playing career^{1}
Years	Club	Games (Goals)
1943–54	Glenelg	145 (555)
1944	South Melbourne	1 (0)
- ^{1} Playing statistics correct to the end of 1954.

Colin Churchett (30 January 1926 – 5 February 2012) was an Australian rules footballer who played with Glenelg in the South Australian National Football League (SANFL). He also played a game for South Melbourne in the Victorian Football League (VFL).

A full-forward known for his accuracy in front of goals, Churchett was the league's top goal-kicker for four consecutive seasons from 1948 to 1951. In the second half of that sequence he kicked 105 goals and 102 goals respectively. He was also Glenelg's leading goal-kicker in an additional two seasons. Churchett represented the South Australian interstate team on seven occasions during his career.

While away in Melbourne on war service in 1944, Churchett played one senior VFL game with South Melbourne. It came in a win over Geelong at the Junction Oval where South Melbourne scored an unusual 8.30 (78) to 8.8 (56) — the biggest winning margin with equal goals in VFL/AFL history.

He was one of the inaugural inductees into the South Australian Football Hall of Fame when it opened in 2002.
