= 2014 SANFL season =

- 132nd season
- Teams: 10
- Premiers: Norwood; 30th premiership
- Minor premiers: Port Adelaide; 44th minor premiership
- Magarey Medallist: Zane Kirkwood; Sturt (29 votes)
- Ken Farmer Medallist: Michael Wundke; Woodville-West Torrens (60 goals)

Attendance
- Matches played: 96
- Total attendance: 325,502 (3,391 per match)
- Highest: 38,644 (Grand Final, Norwood vs. Port Adelaide)

The 2014 South Australian National Football League season (officially the SANFL IGA League) was the 135th season (Note: Although 2014 marks the 139th year since 1877 (including 1877 as a counted year and being the first year of competition in the SANFL), the 2014 season is the 132nd since 1877 due to 6 cancelled seasons in 1916-1918 and 1942-1944 due to World Wars I and II. See List of SANFL premiers for confirmation.) of the South Australian National Football League (SANFL) Australian rules football competition.

2014 introduced a number of changes to the league. The size of the league increased from 9 clubs to 10, after the South Australian Football Commission granted the Australian Football League's Adelaide Football Club a licence to field a reserves team in the competition. Adelaide Oval replaced Football Park as headquarters of the SANFL, resulting in the renovated venue hosting one SANFL minor round match (Anzac Day) and all six SANFL finals matches. The season was shortened to finish a week before the AFL Grand Final, instead of a week after, as had been the case for most years since 1980.

Norwood were the premiers for the 2014 season, after they defeated Port Adelaide by 4 points in the Grand Final in front of a crowd of 38,644, the largest such crowd since 1999. It was the third consecutive premiership for Norwood and their 30th overall.

Sturt, South Adelaide and Woodville-West Torrens also made the top (final) five teams and participated in the finals series. North Adelaide, Central District, Adelaide, West Adelaide and Glenelg all missed the top five, with Glenelg finishing bottom to record its 17th wooden spoon.

== Premiership season ==
Highlights of the season fixture include:

- A shortened 18-round home and away competition, in which each team plays each other twice
- A record 17 night matches, mostly staged in the early part of the season
- Two Showdown matches between Adelaide Football Club and Port Adelaide
- Two Anzac Day matches, including the Grand Final rematch between Norwood vs. North Adelaide at the Adelaide Oval
- First SANFL Grand Final at Adelaide Oval since 1973, to be played at an earlier than usual date on Sunday September 21
- Seven Network replaces ABC as sole television broadcaster; televises one live “match of the round” every week as well as all finals
- The official season motto was announced by the SANFL as: This is Football.

Source: SANFL Season 2014 Results and Fixtures

=== Round 1 ===
	Round 1
Thursday 3 April (7:40 pm)	Norwood 11.10 (76)	def.	Port Adelaide 8.9 (57)	Norwood Oval (crowd: 6,324)
Friday 4 April (7:20 pm)	Glenelg 6.5 (41)	def. by	Sturt 12.12 (84)	Glenelg Oval (crowd: 4,554)
Saturday 5 April (2:10 pm)	Woodville-West Torrens 12.11 (83)	def.	Central District 8.4 (52)	Woodville Oval (crowd: 2,327)
Saturday 5 April (7:10 pm)	South Adelaide 14.16 (100)	def.	West Adelaide 8.3 (51)	Hickinbotham Oval (crowd: 1,790)
Sunday 6 April (2:10 pm)	North Adelaide 20.13 (133)	def.	Adelaide 12.14 (86)	Prospect Oval (crowd: 4,015)
The Norwood-Port Adelaide season opener was shifted to Thursday night after having previously been scheduled for Friday night

=== Round 2 ===
	Round 2
Friday 11 April (7:20 pm)	West Adelaide 9.8 (62)	def. by	Woodville-West Torrens 10.12 (72)	Richmond Oval (crowd: 1,945)
Saturday 12 April (12:10 pm)	Central District 13.8 (86)	def.	Norwood 6.8 (44)	Elizabeth Oval (crowd: 1,959)
Saturday 12 April (2:10 pm)	Sturt 13.19 (97)	def.	Adelaide 9.6 (60)	Unley Oval (crowd: 3,505)
Saturday 12 April (2:10 pm)	North Adelaide 12.10 (82)	def. by	South Adelaide 18.8 (116)	Prospect Oval (crowd: 2,145)
Sunday 13 April (2:10 pm)	Port Adelaide 29.15 (189)	def.	Glenelg 5.7 (37)	Alberton Oval (crowd: 2,738)

=== Round 3 ===
	Round 3
Thursday 17 April (7:20 pm)	West Adelaide 7.13 (55)	def. by	North Adelaide 9.16 (70)	Richmond Oval (crowd: 2,251)
Thursday 17 April (7:40 pm)	Norwood 7.14 (56)	def. by	Sturt 10.14 (74)	Norwood Oval (crowd: 4,856)
Friday 18 April (5:00 pm)	South Adelaide 17.14 (116)	def.	Glenelg 10.11 (71)	Hickinbotham Oval (crowd: 3,984)
Saturday 19 April (2:10 pm)	Central District 9.7 (61)	def. by	Adelaide 16.17 (113)	Elizabeth Oval (crowd: 3,337)
Monday 21 April (2:10 pm)	Woodville-West Torrens; 8.3 (51)	def. by	Port Adelaide 15.19 (109)	Woodville Oval (crowd: 4,247)

=== Round 4 ===
	Round 4 (Anzac Round)
Friday 25 April (3:20 pm)	Norwood 9.16 (70)	def. by	North Adelaide 14.7 (91)	Adelaide Oval (crowd: 10,014)
Friday 25 April (7:10 pm)	Glenelg 17.21 (123)	def.	Adelaide 13.8 (86)	Glenelg Oval (crowd: 9,299)
Saturday 26 April (2:10 pm)	Port Adelaide 21.8 (134)	def.	West Adelaide 11.10 (76)	Alberton Oval (crowd: 2,585)
Saturday 26 April (2:10 pm)	Central District 11.10 (76)	def. by	South Adelaide 12.12 (84)	Elizabeth Oval (crowd: 1,990)
Sunday 27 April (2:10 pm)	Sturt 15.17 (107)	def. by	Woodville-West Torrens 17.11 (113)	Unley Oval (crowd: 3,898)
Norwood play North Adelaide in the traditional ANZAC Day Grand Final replay at the Adelaide Oval

=== Round 5 ===
	Round 5
Friday 2 May (7:20 pm)	Glenelg 8.5 (53)	def. by	Norwood 10.10 (70)	Glenelg Oval (crowd: 1,848)
Saturday 3 May (2:10 pm)	North Adelaide 7.6 (48)	def. by	Sturt 16.13 (109)	Prospect Oval (crowd: 2,147)
Sunday 4 May (2:10 pm)	West Adelaide 15.8 (98)	def.	Central District 4.10 (34)	Richmond Oval (crowd: 1,750)
Sunday 4 May (2:10 pm)	Adelaide 13.9 (87)	def. by	Port Adelaide 20.12 (132)	Clare Oval (crowd: 5,312)
Sunday 4 May (2:10 pm)	South Adelaide 11.9 (75)	def. by	Woodville-West Torrens 13.7 (85)	Hickinbotham Oval (crowd: 1,970)
Round 5 marked the first Showdown clash between Adelaide and Port Adelaide in any SANFL match; The match was Adelaide's only 'home' game for the season and was played in Clare, a regional town 130km north of Adelaide

=== Round 6 ===
	Round 6
Saturday 10 May (2:10 pm)	Central District 14.8 (92)	def.	North Adelaide 13.7 (85)	Elizabeth Oval (crowd: 1,744)
Saturday 10 May (6:30 pm)	West Adelaide 12.7 (79)	def.	Adelaide 6.6 (42)	Richmond Oval (crowd: 1,750)
Saturday 10 May (7:10 pm)	South Adelaide 13.13 (91)	def.	Norwood 7.9 (51)	Hickinbotham Oval (crowd: 1,934)
Sunday 11 May (2:10 pm)	Woodville-West Torrens 17.12 (114)	def.	Glenelg 9.10 (64)	Woodville Oval (crowd: 1,747)
Sunday 11 May (2:10 pm)	Port Adelaide 19.12 (126)	def.	Sturt 11.10 (76)	Alberton Oval (crowd: 2,672)

=== Round 7 ===
	Round 7
Friday 16 May (7:40 pm)	Norwood 16.9 (105)	def.	Adelaide 11.8 (74)	Norwood Oval (crowd: 3,882)
Saturday 17 May (2:10 pm)	Woodville-West Torrens 24.19 (163)	def.	North Adelaide 12.15 (87)	Woodville Oval (crowd: 2,366)
Saturday 17 May (2:10 pm)	Glenelg 13.8 (86)	def.	Central District 12.8 (80)	Glenelg Oval (crowd: 2,449)
Saturday 17 May (2:10 pm)	Port Adelaide 18.14 (122)	def.	South Adelaide 10.2 (62)	Alberton Oval (crowd: 3,121)
Sunday 18 May (2:10 pm)	Sturt 20.12 (132)	def.	West Adelaide 8.5 (53)	Unley Oval (crowd: 3,478)

=== Round 8 ===
	Round 8
Friday 23 May (7:40 pm)	Norwood 10.12 (72)	def. by	Woodville-West Torrens 11.9 (75)	Norwood Oval (crowd: 3,519)
Saturday 24 May (2:10 pm)	Central District 4.15 (39)	def. by	Sturt 14.7 (91)	Elizabeth Oval (crowd: 2,121)
Saturday 24 May (2:10 pm)	North Adelaide 9.9 (63)	def. by	Port Adelaide 12.17 (89)	Prospect Oval (crowd: 2,324)
Saturday 24 May (2:10 pm)	West Adelaide 21.23 (149)	def.	Glenelg 8.3 (51)	Richmond Oval (crowd: 2,312)
Sunday 25 May (1:10 pm)	South Adelaide 13.11 (89)	def. by	Adelaide 17.8 (110)	Hickinbotham Oval (crowd: 2,090)

=== State game ===
	2014 state game
Saturday 31 May (1:10 pm)	VFL 14.12 (96)	def. by	SANFL 18.10 (118)	North Port Oval	Report
This was the first time since 2005 that the VFL and SANFL competitions met in a state game in Victoria.; Frank Johnson Medal (VFL): Adam Marcon; Fos Williams Medallist (SANFL): Zane Kirkwood

=== Round 9 ===
	Round 9
Friday 6 June (7:20 pm)	West Adelaide 5.4 (34)	def. by	Norwood 7.13 (55)	Richmond Oval (crowd: 3,101)
Saturday 7 June (2:10 pm)	Woodville-West Torrens 9.9 (63)	def. by	Adelaide 16.15 (111)	Woodville Oval (crowd: 3,036)
Saturday 7 June (2:10 pm)	Sturt 14.8 (92)	def.	South Adelaide 12.12 (84)	Unley Oval (crowd: 3,138)
Sunday 8 June (2:10 pm)	Port Adelaide 14.7 (91)	def.	Central District 12.6 (78)	Alberton Oval (crowd: 3,059)
Monday 9 June (2:10 pm)	Glenelg 9.7 (61)	def. by	North Adelaide 17.16 (118)	Glenelg Oval (crowd: 3,898)

=== Round 10 ===
	Round 10
Saturday 14 June (2:10 pm)	Central District 10.11 (71)	def.	Adelaide 9.11 (65)	Elizabeth Oval (crowd: 1,703)
Sunday 15 June (2:10 pm)	Glenelg 7.9 (51)	def. by	South Adelaide 14.12 (96)	Glenelg Oval (crowd: 1,869)
Sunday 15 June (2:10 pm)	Port Adelaide 18.16 (124)	def.	Woodville-West Torrens 15.11 (101)	Alberton Oval (crowd: 2,393)
Sunday 15 June (2:10 pm)	Sturt 8.6 (54)	def. by	Norwood 11.9 (75)	Unley Oval (crowd: 3,829)
Sunday 15 June (2:10 pm)	North Adelaide 21.10 (136)	def.	West Adelaide 7.7 (49)	Prospect Oval (crowd: 1,911)

=== Round 11 ===
	Round 11
Saturday 21 June (2:10 pm)	South Adelaide 11.8 (74)	def. by	Central District 13.6 (84)	Hickinbotham Oval (crowd: 1,489)
Saturday 21 June (2:10 pm)	Norwood 25.16 (166)	def.	Glenelg 7.6 (48)	Norwood Oval (crowd: 2,504)
Sunday 22 June (2:10 pm)	West Adelaide 15.8 (98)	def.	Port Adelaide 12.9 (81)	Richmond Oval (crowd: 1,660)
Sunday 22 June (2:10 pm)	Woodville-West Torrens 9.8 (62)	def. by	Sturt 15.12 (102)	Woodville Oval (crowd: 2,447)
Sunday 22 June (2:10 pm)	North Adelaide 13.12 (90)	def. by	Adelaide 15.4 (94)	Prospect Oval (crowd: 2,589)

=== Round 12 ===
	Round 12 (split round)
Friday 27 June (7:40 pm)	Norwood 8.11 (59)	def.	Central District 4.7 (31)	Norwood Oval (crowd: 1,943)
Saturday 28 June (2:10 pm)	Sturt 8.15 (63)	def. by	Port Adelaide 12.11 (83)	Unley Oval (crowd: 2,561)
Friday 4 July (7:20 pm)	West Adelaide 5.11 (41)	def.	Adelaide 4.11 (35)	Richmond Oval (crowd: 1,302)
Saturday 5 July (2:10 pm)	South Adelaide 20.9 (129)	def.	North Adelaide 8.3 (51)	Hickinbotham Oval (crowd: 1,346)
Sunday 6 July (2:10 pm)	Glenelg 8.10 (58)	def. by	Woodville-West Torrens 15.11 (101)	Glenelg Oval (crowd: 2,484)

=== Round 13 ===
	Round 13
Saturday 12 July (2:10 pm)	Central District 13.11 (89)	def.	West Adelaide 8.8 (56)	Elizabeth Oval (crowd: 1,705)
Saturday 12 July (2:10 pm)	Woodville-West Torrens 11.13 (79)	def.	Norwood 8.11 (59)	Woodville Oval (crowd: 2,288)
Saturday 12 July (2:10 pm)	Port Adelaide 14.8 (92)	def. by	North Adelaide 13.16 (94)	Alberton Oval (crowd: 2,340)
Saturday 12 July (2:10 pm)	South Adelaide 7.9 (51)	def. by	Adelaide 14.12 (96)	Hickinbotham Oval (crowd: 1,853)
Saturday 12 July (2:10 pm)	Sturt 11.12 (78)	def.	Glenelg 10.4 (64)	Unley Oval (crowd: 2,916)

=== Round 14 ===
	Round 14 (split round)
Friday 18 July (7:40 pm)	Norwood 10.7 (67)	def.	South Adelaide 7.12 (54)	Norwood Oval (crowd: 2,491)
Saturday 19 July (2:10 pm)	West Adelaide 9.9 (63)	def.	Sturt 8.11 (59)	Richmond Oval (crowd: 2,422)
Saturday 19 July (2:10 pm)	Central District 10.8 (68)	def.	Woodville-West Torrens; 7.5 (47)	Elizabeth Oval (crowd: 2,130)
Saturday 26 July (2:10 pm)	Port Adelaide 15.16 (106)	def.	Adelaide 7.12 (54)	Alberton Oval (crowd: 6,196)
Saturday 26 July (2:10 pm)	North Adelaide 12.8 (80)	def.	Glenelg 5.8 (38)	Prospect Oval (crowd: 2,374)

=== Round 15 ===
	Round 15
Saturday 2 August (2:10 pm)	South Adelaide 10.11 (71)	def.	Port Adelaide 8.6 (54)	Hickinbotham Oval (crowd: 1,692)
Saturday 2 August (6:30 pm)	Glenelg 13.9 (87)	def.	West Adelaide 12.7 (79)	Glenelg Oval (crowd: 2,007)
Sunday 3 August (1:10 pm)	North Adelaide 7.8 (50)	def. by	Norwood 15.13 (103)	Prospect Oval (crowd: 3,059)
Sunday 3 August (2:10 pm)	Woodville-West Torrens 7.8 (50)	def. by	Adelaide 17.16 (118)	Woodville Oval (crowd: 3,822)
Sunday 3 August (2:10 pm)	Sturt 6.9 (45)	def. by	Central District 7.8 (50)	Unley Oval (crowd: 3,102)

=== Round 16 ===
	Round 16
Saturday 9 August (2:10 pm)	Glenelg 13.8 (86)	def. by	Adelaide 16.8 (102)	Glenelg Oval (crowd: 2,627)
Saturday 9 August (2:10 pm)	Central District 16.8 (104)	def.	Port Adelaide 15.11 (101)	Elizabeth Oval (crowd: 2,139)
Saturday 9 August (2:10 pm)	Woodville-West Torrens 8.11 (59)	def. by	South Adelaide 9.11 (65)	Woodville Oval (crowd: 1,871)
Saturday 9 August (2:10 pm)	Norwood 23.9 (147)	def.	West Adelaide 8.10 (58)	Norwood Oval (crowd: 2,801)
Saturday 9 August (2:10 pm)	Sturt 17.8 (110)	def.	North Adelaide 13.13 (91)	Unley Oval (crowd: 2,743)

=== Round 17 ===
	Round 17
Saturday 16 August (2:10 pm)	Sturt 13.9 (87)	def.	Adelaide 12.9 (81)	Unley Oval (crowd: 2,496)
Saturday 16 August (2:10 pm)	Central District 17.7 (109)	def.	Glenelg 7.8 (50)	Elizabeth Oval (crowd: 1,870)
Saturday 16 August (2:10 pm)	North Adelaide 15.9 (99)	def.	Woodville-West Torrens 9.7 (61)	Prospect Oval (crowd: 2,010)
Sunday 17 August (2:10 pm)	West Adelaide 8.2 (50)	def. by	South Adelaide 10.13 (73)	Richmond Oval (crowd: 1,740)
Sunday 17 August (2:10 pm)	Port Adelaide 9.6 (60)	def.	Norwood 6.15 (51)	Alberton Oval (crowd: 4,199)

=== Round 18 ===
	Round 18
Saturday 23 August (2:10 pm)	North Adelaide 18.6 (114)	def.	Central District 11.7 (73)	Prospect Oval (crowd: 2,565)
Saturday 23 August (2:10 pm)	Woodville-West Torrens 21.5 (131)	def.	West Adelaide 10.8 (68)	Woodville Oval (crowd: 1,684)
Saturday 23 August (2:10 pm)	Glenelg 13.14 (92)	def.	Port Adelaide 8.12 (60)	Glenelg Oval (crowd: 2,416)
Saturday 23 August (2:10 pm)	South Adelaide 14.3 (87)	def.	Sturt 9.9 (63)	Hickinbotham Oval (crowd: 2,354)
Saturday 23 August (4:40 pm)	Norwood 18.12 (120)	def.	Adelaide 8.17 (65)	Norwood Oval (crowd: 2,728)
Minor premiership: Port Adelaide (44th)

== Ladder ==
2014 SANFL ladder
Pos	Team	Pld	W	L	D	PF	PA	PP	Pts
1	Port Adelaide	18	12	6	0	1810	1334	57.57	24
2	Norwood (P)	18	11	7	0	1446	1134	56.05	22
3	Sturt	18	11	7	0	1523	1276	54.41	22
4	South Adelaide	18	11	7	0	1517	1315	53.57	22
5	Woodville-West Torrens	18	10	8	0	1510	1499	50.18	20
6	North Adelaide	18	9	9	0	1581	1590	49.86	18
7	Central District	18	9	9	0	1277	1386	47.95	18
8	Adelaide	18	7	11	0	1479	1584	48.29	14
9	West Adelaide	18	6	12	0	1219	1528	44.38	12
10	Glenelg	18	4	14	0	1161	1877	38.22	8

Source: australianfootball.com
Rules for classification: 1) points; 2) percentage; 3) number of points for
(P) Premiers

== Finals series ==
=== Qualifying and elimination finals ===
	Qualifying Final
Saturday 30 August (4:40 pm)	Norwood 10.6 (66)	def.	Sturt 8.9 (57)	Adelaide Oval (crowd: see below)	Report

	Elimination Final
Saturday 30 August (7:40 pm)	South Adelaide 13.11 (89)	def.	Woodville-West Torrens 10.9 (69)	Adelaide Oval (crowd: 12,147)	Report

=== Semi-finals ===
	First Semi-final
Saturday 6 September (2:40 pm)	Sturt 10.9 (69)	def. by	South Adelaide 21.11 (137)	Adelaide Oval (crowd: see below)	Report

	Second Semi-final
Saturday 6 September (5:40 pm)	Port Adelaide 12.7 (79)	def. by	Norwood 13.14 (92)	Adelaide Oval (crowd: 13,431)	Report

=== Preliminary final ===
	Preliminary Final
Sunday 14 September (2:40 pm)	Port Adelaide 13.12 (90)	def.	South Adelaide 10.10 (70)	Adelaide Oval (crowd: 8,079)	Report

=== Grand Final ===
2014 SANFL Grand Final
Sunday 21 September (2:40 pm)	Norwood	def.	Port Adelaide	Adelaide Oval (crowd: 38,644)	Report
5.1 (31); 7.7 (49); 11.8 (74); 12.10 (82)	Q1; Q2; Q3; Final	1.3 (9); 6.7 (43); 10.10 (70); 11.12 (78)	Umpires: C. Deboy, T. Medlin, A. Crosby; Jack Oatey Medallist: Matthew Panos (Norwood); Television broadcast: Seven Network
3: Phillips, Davis; 2: Newton; 1: Panos, Bartlett, Baulderstone, Donohue	Goals	3: Krakouer; 2: Young, Shaw; 1: Summerton, Hitchcock, Mitchell, Amon
Panos, McGuinness, Baulderstone, Smart, Phillips, Webber, Allan, Kirwan	Best	Summerton, Mitchell, Newton, Krakouer, Clurey, Stevenson, Gray
Norwood's win was their 30th premiership in the SANFL and their first premiership hat-trick since winning three in a row from 1887 to 1989.

== Club performances ==
=== SANFL Premiership ===
Club	Home ground	Home & away ladder position	Finals result	Best & Fairest	Best home attendance	Ave. home attendance
Adelaide	None	8th	—N/a	Ian Callinan	5,312 (Rd 5)†	—N/a
Central District	Elizabeth Oval	7th	—N/a	Jarrod Schiller	3,337 (Rd 3)	2,070 (10 games)
Glenelg	Glenelg Oval	10th	—N/a	Craig Pitt & Andrew Bradley	9,299 (Rd 4)	3,323 (10 games)
North Adelaide	Prospect Oval	6th	—N/a	Jay Shannon	4,015 (Rd 1)	2,513 (10 games)
Norwood	Norwood Oval	2nd	**Premiers**	Kieran McGuinness	6,324 (Rd 1)†	4,110 (10 games)
Port Adelaide	Alberton Oval	1st	Grand Final	Steven Summerton	6,196 (Rd 14)	3,256 (9 games)
South Adelaide	Hickinbotham Oval	4th	Preliminary Final	Keegan Brooksby	3,984 (Rd 3)	2,050 (10 games)
Sturt	Unley Oval	3rd	Semi-final	Zane Kirkwood	3,898 (Rd 4)	3,167 (10 games)
West Adelaide	Richmond Oval	9th	—N/a	Jonathon Beech	3,101 (Rd 9)	2,023 (10 games)
Woodville-West Torrens	Woodville Oval	5th	Elimination Final	Scott Lewis	4,247 (Rd 3)	2,584 (10 games)

† Adelaide had only one home game in 2014; at Clare Oval in the regional town of Clare. Also Norwood's "home" crowd in Round 4 was 10,014 (Rd 4) for the Anzac Day match at Adelaide Oval against North Adelaide.

=== SANFL win/loss table ===
Team	1	2	3	4	5	6	7	8	9	10	11	12	13	14	15	16	17	18	F1	F2	F3	GF	Ladder
Adelaide	North; 47	Sturt; 37	CD; 52	Gln; 37	**Port**; **45**	West; 37	Nor; 31	SA; 21	WWT; 48	CD; 6	North; 4	West; 6	SA; 45	Port; 52	WWT; 68	Gln; 16	Sturt; 6	Nor; 55	X	X	X	X	8
Central District	WWT; 31	**Nor**; **42**	**Adel**; **52**	**SA**; **8**	West; 64	**North**; **7**	Gln; 6	**Sturt**; **52**	Port; 13	**Adel**; **6**	SA; 10	Nor; 28	**West**; **33**	**WWT**; **21**	Sturt; 5	**Port**; **3**	**Gln**; **59**	North; 41	X	X	X	X	7
Glenelg	**Sturt**; **43**	Port; 152	SA; 45	**Adel**; **37**	**Nor**; **17**	WWT; 50	**CD**; **6**	West; 98	**North**; **57**	**SA**; **45**	Nor; 118	**WWT**; **43**	Sturt; 14	North; 42	**West**; **8**	**Adel**; **16**	CD; 59	**Port**; **32**	X	X	X	X	10
North Adelaide	**Adel**; **47**	**SA**; **34**	West; 15	Nor; 21	**Sturt**; **61**	CD; 7	WWT; 76	**Port**; **26**	Gln; 57	**West**; **87**	**Adel**; **4**	SA; 78	Port; 2	**Gln**; **42**	**Nor**; **53**	Sturt; 19	**WWT**; **38**	**CD**; **41**	X	X	X	X	6
Norwood	**Port**; **19**	CD; 42	**Sturt**; **18**	**North**; **21**	Gln; 17	SA; 40	**Adel**; **31**	**WWT**; **3**	West; 21	Sturt; 21	**Gln**; **118**	**CD**; **28**	WWT; 20	**SA**; **13**	North; 53	**West**; **89**	Port; 9	**Adel**; **55**	**Sturt**; **9**	Port; 13	X	**Port**; **4**	**1**
Port Adelaide	Nor; 19	**Gln**; **152**	WWT; 58	**West**; **58**	Adel; 45	**Sturt**; **50**	**SA**; **60**	North; 26	**CD**; **13**	**WWT**; **23**	West; 17	Sturt; 20	**North**; **2**	**Adel**; **52**	SA; 17	CD; 3	**Nor**; **9**	Gln; 32	X	**Nor**; **13**	**SA**; **20**	Nor; 4	2
South Adelaide	**West**; **49**	North; 34	**Gln**; **45**	CD; 8	**WWT**; **10**	**Nor**; **40**	Port; 60	**Adel**; **21**	Sturt; 8	Gln; 45	**CD**; **10**	**North**; **78**	**Adel**; **45**	Nor; 13	**Port**; **17**	WWT; 6	West; 23	**Sturt**; **24**	**WWT**; **20**	Sturt; 68	Port; 20	X	3
Sturt	Gln; 43	**Adel**; **37**	Nor; 18	**WWT**; **6**	North; 61	Port; 50	**West**; **79**	CD; 52	**SA**; **8**	**Nor**; **21**	WWT; 40	**Port**; **20**	**Gln**; **14**	West; 4	**CD**; **5**	**North**; **19**	**Adel**; **6**	SA; 24	Nor; 9	**SA**; **68**	X	X	4
West Adelaide	SA; 49	**WWT**; **10**	**North**; **15**	Port; 58	**CD**; **64**	**Adel**; **37**	Sturt; 79	**Gln**; **98**	**Nor**; **21**	North; 87	**Port**; **17**	**Adel**; **6**	CD; 33	**Sturt**; **4**	Gln; 8	Nor; 89	**SA**; **23**	WWT; 63	X	X	X	X	9
Woodville-West Torrens	**CD**; **31**	West; 10	**Port**; **58**	Sturt; 6	SA; 10	**Gln**; **50**	**North**; **76**	Nor; 3	**Adel**; **48**	Port; 23	**Sturt**; **40**	Gln; 43	**Nor**; **20**	CD; 21	**Adel**; **68**	**SA**; **6**	North; 38	**West**; **63**	SA; 20	X	X	X	5
Team	1	2	3	4	5	6	7	8	9	10	11	12	13	14	15	16	17	18	F1	F2	F3	GF	Ladder

+	Win	Qualified for finals
−	Loss	Eliminated

Bold – Home game
X – Did not play
Opponent for round listed above margin

=== Foxtel Cup ===
Club	Result
Norwood	Eliminated in Round 1
West Adelaide	Eliminated in Round 1

**Game #1** **(Rd 1)** 29 April 2014; 20:05 CST	**West Adelaide**	**57 - 61** stand alone game	**Western Storm**	Adelaide Oval match report match statistics
	2.1 (13); 4.4 (28); 7.4 (46); 8.9 (57)	match report	4.2 (26); 7.4 (46); 9.6 (60); 9.7 (61)
		**Goals**
	Hopton 2, Watchman 2, Dijksman, Schott, De Zylva.		Collis 2, McCulloch 2, Brown, Thomas, McGee, Russell, Barker.
		**Bests**
	De Zylva, Jennings, Dijksman, Nelson.		Hanson, Hills, Blackberry, Reinmuth, McCulloch.

**Game #4** **(Rd 1)** 27 May 2014; 18:35 WST	**East Perth**	**65 - 15** stand alone game	**Norwood**	Patersons Stadium match report match statistics
	2.4 (16); 6.6 (42); 8.8 (56); 9.11 (65)	match report	0.1 (1); 0.2 (2); 1.3 (9); 2.3 (15)
		**Goals**
	S.Tunbridge 2, S.Lycett, B.Lee, W.Maginness, D.Main, J. Smith, B.Colledge, J.Oakley-Nicholls		S.Phillips, M.Bower
		**Bests**
	S.Lycett, S.Tunbridge, B.Colledge, F.Clutterbuck, B.Lee, S.Payne		T.DeMatteis, K.Murphy, D.Auciello, S.Baldasso, T.Forster

== Awards and events ==
=== Awards ===
- The Magarey Medal (awarded to the best and fairest player in the home and away season) was won by Zane Kirkwood of Sturt, who polled 29 votes.
- The Ken Farmer Medal (awarded to the leading goalkicker in the home and away season) was won by Michael Wundke of Woodville-West Torrens. He kicked 60 goals in the 2014 home and away season.
- The Stanley H. Lewis Memorial Trophy (awarded to the best performing club in the League, Reserves and Under 18 competitions) was won by North Adelaide, with 2375 points, 25 points ahead of Woodville-West Torrens.
- The R.O Shearman Medal (awarded to the player adjudged best by the 10 SANFL club coaches each game) was won by Steven Summerton of Port Adelaide.
- Port Adelaide were the minor premiers, finishing top of the ladder at the end of the home and away season with 12 wins and 6 losses. It is the club's 44th minor premiership in the SANFL.

=== Events ===
- The annual City v. Country Cup Match was held in April 2014 at the Adelaide Oval. City won by 31 points, defeating Country 12.10 (82) to 7.9 (51). Dale Armstrong won the Bill Botten Medal as best afield for City whilst Jackson O'Brien won Peter Kitschke Medal as best afield for Country.
- The Under 18 State Game was contested by South Australia (SANFL) and Western Australia (WAFL). South Australia recorded a 31-point win; 14.8 (92) def. 8.13 (61).
- The Under 16 Talent Shield competition was won by Glenelg, who defeated Sturt in the Grand Final at AAMI Stadium by 25 points; 11.11 (77) def. 7.10 (52).
- Jake Parkinson, a regional director for Australasian food and beverage company Lion, replaced Leigh Wicker in the role of Chief Executive Officer (CEO) of the SANFL in October.

=== Premiers ===
- Norwood were the League premiers, defeating Port Adelaide by 4 points.
- Woodville-West Torrens were the Reserves premiers, defeating Sturt by 16 points.
- West Adelaide were the Under 18 premiers, defeating Woodville-West Torrens by 35 points.
