= Doug Long (Australian footballer) =

Australian rules footballer and coach

Personal information
- Full name: Doug Long
- Born: 28 March 1940
- Died: 9 February 2009 (aged 68); Adelaide
- Original team: South Gambier
- Height: 193 cm (6 ft 4 in)
- Weight: 94 kg (207 lb)
- Position: Ruckman

Playing career^{1}
Years	Club	Games (Goals)
1957–61	Geelong	73 (52)
1962–69	Glenelg	135
- ^{1} Playing statistics correct to the end of 1969.

Doug Long (28 March 1940 – 9 February 2009) was an Australian rules footballer who played for Geelong in the Victorian Football League (VFL) and Glenelg in the South Australian National Football League (SANFL).

A ruckman from South Gambier, Long spent five seasons with Geelong and participated in their 1961 Night Premiership win. He moved to South Australia in 1962, having been appointed captain-coach of Glenelg, despite only turning 22 at the start of the season. After steering the club to fifth position that year, Glenelg fell to seventh in 1963 and he was replaced by Len Fitzgerald. He continued to give Glenelg good service as a player and was often used at full-back when Neil Kerley was coach later in the decade. A seven time South Australian interstate representative, Long was inducted into Glenelg's 'Hall of Fame' in 2006.
