= Glenelg Football Club =

Australian rules football team

Names
- Full name: Glenelg Football Club
- Nickname(s): Tigers, Bays
- After finals: 4th

Club details
- Founded: 10 March 1920; 106 years ago
- Colours: Black Gold
- Competition: South Australian National Football League (SANFL)
- President: Peter Carey
- Coach: Matthew Clarke
- Captain: Liam McBean
- Premierships: SANFL (7): 1934; 1973; 1985; 1986; 2019; 2023; 2024; SANFLW (1): 2021
- Ground: Stratarama Stadium (capacity: 15,000)

Uniforms
Home	Alt

Other information
- Official website: www.glenelgfc.com.au

The Glenelg Football Club, nicknamed the Tigers or the Bays, is an Australian rules football team which plays in the South Australian National Football League. Their home ground is Stratarama Stadium (formerly Glenelg Oval), located in the southern coastal suburb of Glenelg East, South Australia.

== Club history ==
The inaugural meeting of the Glenelg Football Club was held at the Glenelg Town Hall on Wednesday, 10 March 1920, to form a club for players west of South Road to play in the B Grade. It was decided that the club colors would be red, yellow and black with white knickers.

The Club participated in the B Grade (Reserves) Competition in 1920 and entered the South Australian League in 1921. At the Annual meeting on Thursday 3 March 1921 the club decided its colours to be black and gold, the guernsey to be black with a gold hoop around waist and arms, black socks with gold band, and white knickers. It was not until 2 May 1925 that the club saw its first league victory, a 12.6 (78) to 10.10 (70) win over West Torrens at Glenelg Oval.

"The Bays", as they are sometimes known (due to the club's proximity to Holdfast Bay), won their first SANFL premiership in 1934 with an 18.15 (123) to 16.18 (114) victory against Port Adelaide, by now wearing a jersey which was gold with a black V; first introduced in 1927. The 1935 season saw them slump from first to last.

Until 1948, the team jersey remained gold with a black V. Following the appointment of Allan "Bull" Reval as coach in 1949, the club adopted the now familiar black with gold sash design. Since 2021, the team has revived and adopted the 1927 – 1949 jersey as an alternate strip for away games.

In total the club has won 7 premierships – 1934, 1973, back to back flags in 1985/1986, 2019 and back to back flags in 2023/2024.

Glenelg amalgamated with West Adelaide Football Club during the war years 1942 to 1944.

Glenelg was a foundation member of the SANFL Women's competition in 2017. The Tigers won their first SANFLW Premiership in 2021.

== Home grounds ==
- Glenelg Oval (Stratarama Stadium) (1921–90, 1992–present)
- Football Park (1991)

Since the club first entered the SANFL they have used Glenelg Oval as their home ground. The only year this did not occur was in 1991 when Glenelg used Football Park (along with new team Woodville-West Torrens) under the SANFL's ground rationalisation scheme. This arrangement only lasted for the 1991 season as Glenelg moved back to The Bay while the Eagles moved to Woodville Oval.

In 2012 Glenelg Oval became one of five suburban SANFL grounds to have lights installed for night games.

The ground record crowd for Glenelg Oval was set on 20 July 1968 when 17,171 saw Sturt defeat Glenelg by just one point, 13.13 (91) to 13.12 (90). The record night attendance was set on 25 April 2014 (Anzac Day) when 9,245 saw Glenelg defeat the Adelaide Crows reserves 17.21 (123) to 13.8 (86) for the Tigers first win of the 2014 SANFL season.

Glenelg Oval also saw the highest score in SANFL history in 1975 when Glenelg defeated Central District 49.23 (317) to 11.13 (79): the winning margin of 238 is the 2017 the SANFL record, and remains the club's record win. Glenelg's champion full-forward, the 1969 Magarey Medallist Fred Phillis, kicked 18 goals for the game, including his 100th for the season.

== Club song ==
The Glenelg Tigers have the same club song as that of the Richmond Tigers based on "Row, Row, Row".
Oh we're from Tigerland
A fighting fury, we're from Tigerland
In any weather you'll see us with a grin
Risking head and shin
If we're behind then never mind
We'll fight and fight and win
For we're from Tigerland.
We never weaken till the final siren's gone
Like the Tiger of old, we're strong and we're bold
For we're from Tiger (yellow and black) we're from Tigerland.

=== Current league & reserves playing list for 2025 ===
2025 Glenelg Football Club squad
Playing list			Coaching Staff
1 Archie Lovelock; 2 Jonty Scharenberg; 3 Jake Walker; 4 Cole Gerloff; 5 Liam McBean (C); 6 Hugh Stagg; 7 Luke Reynolds; 8 Corey Lyons; 9 Darcy Bailey; 10 Luke Partington; 11 James Bell; 12 Max Proud; 13 Oscar Adams; 14 Brad McCarthy; 15 Patrick Parnell; 16 Alex Martini; 17 Jarryd Lyons; 18 Karl Finlay; 19 Cameron McGree	20 Lachlan Hosie; 21 Liam Jones; 22 Matthew Allen; 23 Riley Holder; 24 Cooper Horsnell; 25 Darcy Scott; 26 Liam Wisdom; 27 Nick Stevens; 28 Isaac Hyatt; 29 Connor McLeod; 30 Ben Ridgway; 31 Cooper Beecken; 32 Matt Coulthard; 33 Ryan Pickering; 34 Will Stockman; 35 Hayden Brokensha; 36 Will Chandler; 38 Lachlan Scannell; 39 Waylon Davey-Motlop; 40 Remi Brown	41 Lucas McInnerney; 42 Chaz Baltussen; 43 Jack McAuley; 44 Latrell Pickett; 45 Darcy Porter; 46 Beau Symonds; 47 Max Guerher; 49 Max Disbury; 50 Tom Cocoran; 51 Charlie McAuliffe; 52 Oliver Betterman; 53 Ben Dehirst; 54 Kallan Bevan; 55 Harry Francis; 57 Aydan Hodgeson; 59 Tom McKay; 60 Rogan Kennedy; 63 Archer Rouvray; 64 Will Stevens	Head coach: Matthew Clarke; Assistant coaches: Brett Exelby; Shamus Schutt; Damien Raidis; Legend: (c) Captain(s); (vc) Vice-captain(s)

== Club achievements ==
Premierships
Competition	Level	Wins	Years won
South Australian National Football League	Men's Seniors	7	1934, 1973, 1985, 1986, 2019, 2023, 2024
South Australian National Football League	Women's Seniors	1	2021
South Australian National Football League	Men's Reserves (1919–2026) / Under-23s (2027-present)	9	1967, 1981, 1982, 2007, 2009, 2011, 2021, 2023, 2025
South Australian National Football League	Women's Reserves (Note: The second-tier of women's competition was officially referred to as the "Development League".) (2022–2025)	1	2025
South Australian National Football League	Under 19s (1937–2008) / Under 18s (2009–present)	11	1959, 1967, 1969, 1979, 1992, 2008, 2009, 2010, 2016, 2023, 2026
South Australian National Football League	Under 17s (1939–2008) / Under 16s (2010–present)	10	1958, 1959, 1960, 1975, 2014, 2016, 2017, 2018, 2019, 2026
Other titles and honours
Stanley H Lewis Trophy	Multiple	11	1969, 1973, 1975, 1976, 1981, 1990, 2009, 2010, 2019, 2021, 2023
SANFL Night Series	Senior	4	1959, 1982, 1990, 1992
Finishing positions
South Australian National Football League	Minor premiership (men's seniors)	8	1969, 1973, 1981, 2008, 2009, 2019, 2021, 2023
South Australian National Football League	Grand Finalists (men's seniors)	22	1934, 1950, 1969, 1970, 1973, 1974, 1975, 1977, 1981, 1982, 1985, 1986, 1987, 1988, 1990, 1992, 2008, 2019, 2021, 2023, 2024, 2025
South Australian National Football League	Wooden spoons (men's seniors)	20	1921, 1922, 1923, 1924, 1925, 1935, 1937, 1938, 1939, 1940, 1946, 1954, 1960, 1966, 1998, 2000, 2001, 2002, 2013, 2014
South Australian National Football League	Grand Finalists (women's seniors)	1	2021
South Australian National Football League	Wooden spoons (women's seniors)	2	2018, 2026

== Club records ==
- Home Ground: Glenelg Oval (Stratarama Stadium) (1921–90, 1992–Current)
- Previous Grounds: Football Park (1991)
- Record Attendance at Glenelg Oval: 17,171 v Sturt on 20 July 1968
- Record Attendance at Glenelg Oval since Adelaide Football Club formation (1991): 11,827 v Sturt, 28 June 2008
- Record Night Attendance at Glenelg Oval: 9,245 v Adelaide, 25 April 2014
- Record Attendance: 58,113 v Sturt at Football Park, 1974 SANFL Grand Final
- Record Attendance since Adelaide Crows formation (1991): 42,242 v Port Adelaide at AAMI Stadium, 1992 SANFL Grand Final
- Record Attendance since Port Adelaide AFL entry (1997): 39,105 v Port Adelaide, 2019 SANFL Grand Final
- Most Games: 423 by Peter Carey (1971–88)
- Most Goals: 842 by D.K. "Fred" Phillis (1966–78, 1981)
- Most Goals in Match: 18 by D.K. "Fred" Phillis v Central District in 1975
- Most Goals in a Season: 137 by D.K. "Fred" Phillis in 1969
- Most Years as Coach: 10 by Neil Kerley (1967–76)
- Most Years as Captain: 8 by Nick Chigwidden (1993–2000)
- Highest Score: 49.23 (317) v Central District 11.13 (79) at Glenelg Oval in Round 17, 23 August 1975
- Greatest Win: 238 points v Central District in 1975
- Longest Winning Run: 18 in 1973–1974

== Post–World War II coaches ==
- Ray Curnow (1945)
- Norm Betson (1946)
- Ray Curnow (1947–1948)
- Allan Reval (1949)
- Johnny Taylor (1950–1952)
- Pat Hall (1953–1954)
- Charlie May (1955–1957)
- Neil Davies (1958–1959)
- Marcus Boyall (1960)
- Stan Wickham (1961)
- Doug Long (1962–1963)
- Len Fitzgerald (1964–1966)
- Neil Kerley (1967–1976)
- John Nicholls (1977–1978)
- John Halbert (1979–1982)
- Graham Campbell (1983–1984)
- Graham Cornes (1985–1990)
- Kym Hodgeman (1991–1992)
- Mark Williams (1993–1994)
- Tony Symonds (1995–1996)
- Wayne Stringer (1997)
- Tony McGuinness (1998–2000)
- Brenton Honor (2001–2002)
- David Noble (2003–2004)
- Peter Simmons (2005)
- Tony Burgess (2005)
- Mark Mickan (2006–2011)
- Kris Massie (2011–2013)
- Nick Stevens (2014)
- Matthew Lokan (2015–2017)
- Mark Stone (2018–2020)
- Brett Hand (2021–2022)
- Darren Reeves (2023–2025)
- Matthew Clarke (2026– )

== Post–World War II placings ==
- 1945 – 7th
- 1946 – 8th
- 1947 – 7th
- 1948 – 6th
- 1949 – 5th
- 1950 – 2nd
- 1951 – 3rd
- 1952 – 5th
- 1953 – 3rd
- 1954 – 8th
- 1955 – 6th
- 1956 – 6th
- 1957 – 7th
- 1958 – 7th
- 1959 – 3rd
- 1960 – 8th
- 1961 – 7th
- 1962 – 5th
- 1963 – 7th
- 1964 – 4th
- 1965 – 6th
- 1966 – 10th
- 1967 – 4th
- 1968 – 5th
- 1969 – 2nd
- 1970 – 2nd
- 1971 – 6th
- 1972 – 6th
- 1973 – 1st
- 1974 – 2nd
- 1975 – 2nd
- 1976 – 3rd
- 1977 – 2nd
- 1978 – 4th
- 1979 – 7th
- 1980 – 4th
- 1981 – 2nd
- 1982 – 2nd
- 1983 – 7th
- 1984 – 3rd
- 1985 – 1st
- 1986 – 1st
- 1987 – 2nd
- 1988 – 2nd
- 1989 – 5th
- 1990 – 2nd
- 1991 – 6th
- 1992 – 2nd
- 1993 – 4th
- 1994 – 5th
- 1995 – 7th
- 1996 – 7th
- 1997 – 8th
- 1998 – 9th
- 1999 – 4th
- 2000 – 9th
- 2001 – 9th
- 2002 – 9th
- 2003 – 8th
- 2004 – 7th
- 2005 – 8th
- 2006 – 6th
- 2007 – 4th
- 2008 – 2nd
- 2009 – 3rd
- 2010 – 4th
- 2011 – 5th
- 2012 – 6th
- 2013 – 9th
- 2014 – 10th
- 2015 – 9th
- 2016 – 7th
- 2017 – 7th
- 2018 – 6th
- 2019 – 1st
- 2020 – 4th
- 2021 – 2nd
- 2022 – 4th
- 2023 – 1st
- 2024 – 1st
- 2025 – 2nd
- 2026 - 4th

== Magarey Medallists ==
The Magarey Medal is awarded to the "fairest and most brilliant" player in the League during the Home and Away season. Glenelg has ten Magarey Medalists:

- 1928 – Jim Handby
- 1934 – George "Blue" Johnston
- 1940 – Mel Brock
- 1941 – Marcus Boyall
- 1949 – Allan Crabb
- 1969 – D.K. "Fred" Phillis
- 1978 – Kym Hodgeman
- 1982 – Tony McGuinness
- 2006 – Brett Backwell
- 2019 – Luke Partington

== SANFL Leading Goalkickers (Ken Farmer Medalists) ==
The SANFL leading goalkicker award is presented to the competition's leading goalkicker at the end of the home-and-away season. Since 1981, it has been known as the Ken Farmer Medal. Glenelg players have won the award on 20 occasions:

- 1927 – Jack Owens (80 goals)
- 1928 – Jack Owens (83)
- 1932 – Jack Owens (102)
- 1948 – Colin Churchett (88)
- 1949 – Colin Churchett (72)
- 1950 – Colin Churchett (105)
- 1951 – Colin Churchett (102)
- 1969 – D.K. "Fred" Phillis (137)
- 1970 – D.K. "Fred" Phillis (107)
- 1971 – D.K. "Fred" Phillis (99)
- 1975 – D.K. "Fred" Phillis (108)
- 1976 – D.K. "Fred" Phillis (98)
- 2010 – Todd Grima (58)
- 2015 – Clint Alleway (47)
- 2019 – Liam McBean (46)
- 2020 – Liam McBean (38)
- 2021 – Liam McBean (51)
- 2023 – Lachlan Hosie (61)
- 2025 – Lachlan Hosie (79)
- 2026 – Lachlan Hosie (66)

== Fos Williams Medalists ==
The Fos Williams Medal is awarded to the best player during State of Origin games for South Australia. Glenelg has seven Fos Williams Medalists, including one dual medalist:

- 1981 – Peter Carey (v WA)
- 1982 – Stephen Copping (v Vic)
- 1982 – Paul Weston (v WA)
- 1984 – Stephen Kernahan (v Vic)
- 1987 – Chris McDermott (v Vic)
- 1988 – Stephen Kernahan (v Vic)
- 2003 – Brett Backwell (v WAFL)
- 2025 – Corey Lyons (v VFL)

== Jack Oatey Medalists ==
The Jack Oatey Medal since 1981 is awarded to the best player during Grand Final. Glenelg has five Jack Oatey Medalists:

- 1985 – Stephen Kernahan
- 1986 – Tony Hall
- 2019 – Matthew Snook
- 2023 – Lachlan Hosie
- 2024 – Liam McBean

== Glenelg Hall of Fame ==
The Glenelg Football Club Hall of Fame commenced in 2001, when 25 former champions were inducted. On an irregular basis further inductees have been added and currently there are 56 members of the Hall of Fame.

Glenelg’s Hall of Fame recognises and enshrines players who have made a significant contribution to the Glenelg Football Club since its entry into the SANFL in 1921. A candidate’s individual record, ability, integrity, sportsmanship and character are taken into account.

The Glenelg Football Club Hall of Fame divides players into five main historical eras for the club: 1) 1921–1939; 2) 1940–1960; 3) 1961–1976; 4) 1977–1990; and 5) 1991–2023.

1921–1939
Jack Hanley · Arthur Link · Mel Brock · Jim Handby · George Johnston · Jack Owens · Len Sallis

1940–1960
Ray Hunt · Allan Crabb · Colin Churchett · Neil Davies · Kevin Abley · Marcus Boyall · Don Hewett · Ted Robjent

1961–1976
Fred Phillis · Peter Marker · Wayne Phillis · Rex Voigt · Graham Cornes · Neville Caldwell · Brian Colbey · Kerry Hamilton · Neil Kerley · Harry Kernahan · Hayden Linke · Doug Long · Laurie Rosewarne · Colin Richens

1977–1990
Peter Carey · John MacFarlane · Paul Weston · Kym Hodgeman · Stephen Copping · David Holst · Jim Lihou · David Marshall · John Seebohm · Stephen Kernahan · Chris McDermott · Tony Symonds · Tony McGuinness · Chris Duthy · Tony Hall · Ross Gibbs · Keith Kuhlmann · Peter Maynard · Peter McInerney · Scott Salisbury

1991–2023
Nick Chigwidden · Ty Allen · Allan Bartlett · Simon Hele · Ben Mules · Andrew Bradley · Paul Sherwood

== Club ambassadors ==
As of 2013 the Glenelg Football Club has seven club ambassadors. They are:

- Anna Meares – Multiple World and Olympic track cycling champion.
- Brett Aitken – Olympic track cyclist. 2000 Olympic Gold Medallist – Men's Madison
- Gary Sweet – Film and television actor
- Jane Woodlands-Thompson – Head coach of the ANZ Championship's Adelaide Thunderbirds netball team
- John Hawkes – Leading Australian horse trainer
- Kate Ellis – Federal Member for Adelaide. Current Shadow Minister for Education and Early Childhood.
- Luke Schenscher – 7 ft 1 in (216 cm) tall former NBA basketball player. Formerly played for the Adelaide 36ers in the National Basketball League.

== Notes ==
Preceded by West Torrens; North Adelaide; Norwood; North Adelaide; Norwood	SANFL Premiers; 1934; 1973; 1985–1986; 2019; 2023–2024	Succeeded by South Adelaide; Sturt; North Adelaide; Woodville-West Torrens; Sturt
