= Jack Owens (footballer) =

Australian rules footballer

Personal information
- Full name: Jack Owens
- Born: 3 August 1902; Broken Hill, New South Wales
- Died: 26 September 1942 (aged 40); Adelaide, South Australia
- Original team: West Broken Hill
- Position: Full-forward

Playing career^{1}
| Years | Club | Games (Goals) |
| 1924–35 | Glenelg | 177 (827) |
- ^{1} Playing statistics correct to the end of 1935.

Career highlights
- SANFL Premiership captain 1934; SANFL Leading goalkicker 1927, 1928, 1932; Glenelg Leading goalkicker 1924, 1925, 1926, 1927, 1928, 1929, 1930, 1931, 1932, 1934

Jack Owens (3 August 1902 – 26 September 1942) was an Australian rules footballer who played for Glenelg in the South Australian National Football League (SANFL) during the 1920s and 1930s.

== Life and career ==
Originally from the West Broken Hill club, Owens was a miner in that city at eighteen, and during this work he suffered severely from dust in his lungs. The youngest of four Glenelg recruits from Broken Hill in 1923 and 1924, Jack Owens became a prolific left footed full-forward who excelled despite playing much of his career in the league’s weakest team. He favored the screw punt when he lined up for goals and it was effective as he topped Glenelg's goalkicking every year from 1924 to 1932, as well as for a tenth time in 1934. On three of those occasions he was the league's leading goal scorer, outright in 1927 and 1928 with 80 and 83 goals respectively while he tied for the mantle in 1932 with Ken Farmer on 102 goals.

Towards the end of his career, Glenelg began to improve and in 1934 he captained the club to their inaugural SANFL premiership. He was also South Australian captain for interstate matches in 1933 and 1934. In all he appeared for South Australia on nine occasions and kicked 26 goals.

At the age of 32, however, Owens showed he was on the decline so quickly in 1935 that he announced his retirement after just three games and eight goals. Only seven years later, in 1942, he died after a long illness.

In 2002 Owens was in the first group of players inducted into the South Australian Football Hall of Fame.

== See also ==
- 1927 Melbourne Carnival
