= Glenelg Oval =

Sports stadium

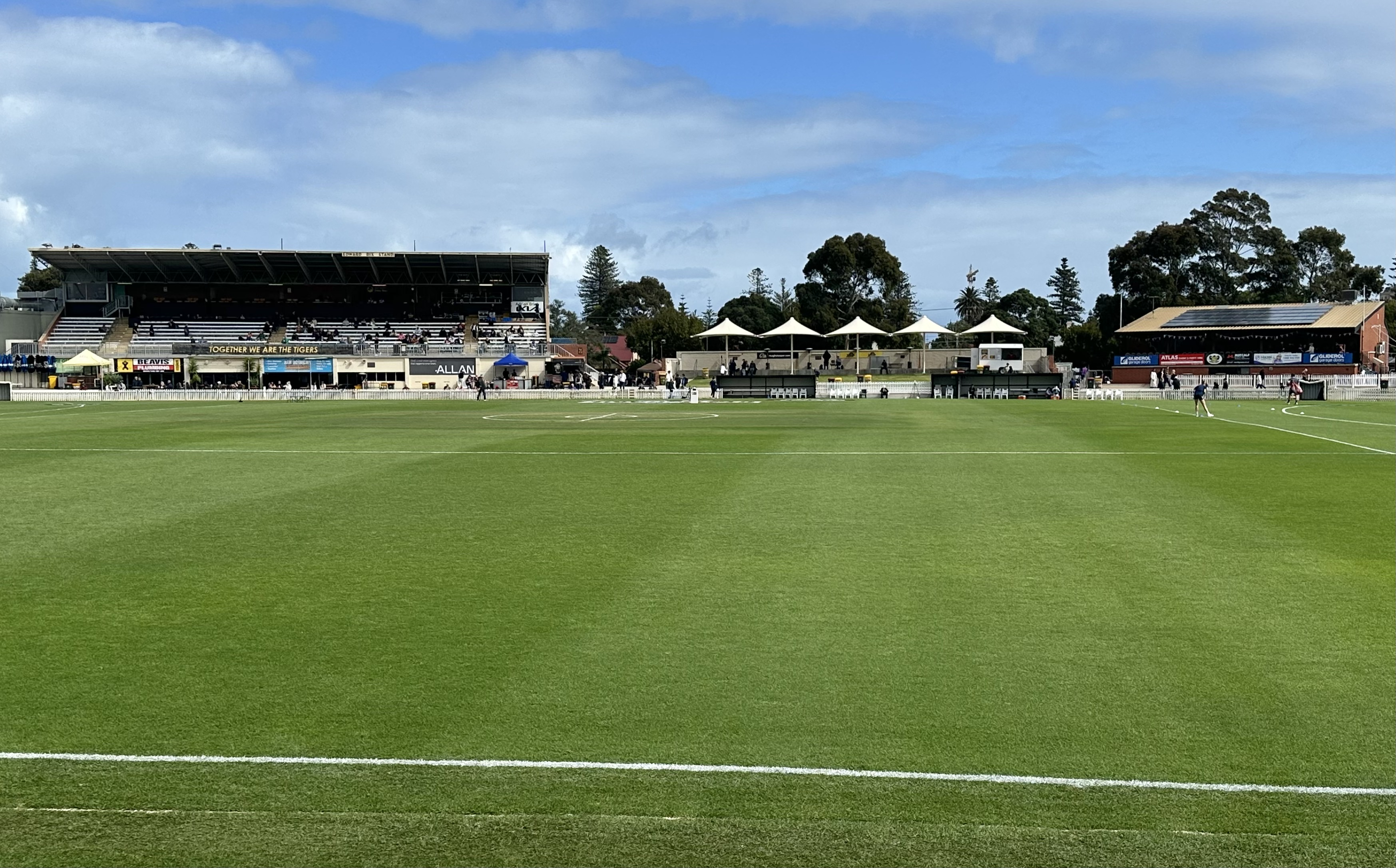
- Interactive map of Glenelg Oval
- Address: Glenelg East, South Australia
- Coordinates: 34°59′1″S 138°31′18″E
- Capacity: 15,000
- Record attendance: 17,171 – Glenelg vs Sturt, 20 July 1968
- Field size: Football: 160m x 115m

Construction
- Opened: 1920; 106 years ago

Tenants
- Glenelg Football Club (1921–); Glenelg Cricket Club

Glenelg Oval (known under naming rights as Stratarama Stadium) is an Australian rules football and cricket venue located in the Adelaide suburb of Glenelg East. It is the home of the Glenelg Football Club in the South Australian National Football League (SANFL) and the Glenelg Cricket Club in the South Australian Premier Cricket (SAPC) competition.

== History ==
The oval has a current capacity of 15,000 and the entire spectator area on the western or Brighton Road side of the ground is concrete terracing. This is also where the former 500-seat HY Sparkes Stand and the 1,000-seat Edward Rix Stand, as well as the Glenelg Cricket Club, are located. The Glenelg Football Club offices, bars and function rooms are located under the Rix Stand. The entire outer side of the ground, which extends from goal to goal, consists only of grass banking which is less than five-metres wide on the outer wing. The area in front of the southern end of the Rix Stand is also where the Glenelg cheer squad stands for games, near the female and opposition change rooms and current home-team players race. This is the former location of the Snouts Bar, now situated near the new electronic scoreboard located where the old scoreboard stood. At only 160m x 115m, Glenelg Oval is among the smallest playing surfaces in the SANFL.

The ground record attendance was set on 20 July 1968 when 17,171 saw Sturt defeat Glenelg by just one point, 13.13 (91) to 13.12 (90).

Glenelg Oval saw the highest score kicked by any team in SANFL history when Glenelg defeated Central District 49.23 (317) to 11.13 (79) in round 18 of the 1975 SANFL season. The 228-point winning margin was an SANFL record at the time. Tigers champion full-forward D.K. "Fred" Phillis, a Magarey Medal winner for the Bays in 1969, kicked a Glenelg club record 18 goals in the match. Other stars for Glenelg on that famous day included Graham Cornes, Peter Carey, Peter Marker and John McFarlane. Late in the last quarter, McFarlane, who had kicked almost 10 goals for the game, had a shot on goal that would have been the Tigers 50th. The ball hit the post though and was recorded as a point (in Australian football, if a kicked ball hits the goal posts, even if it then bounces through the goals untouched by any player or bounces back into play, the ball is dead and a point is awarded to the attacking team).

In 2009, the oval was renamed to Gliderol Stadium @ Glenelg as part of a sponsorship arrangement between the football club and its major sponsor, Gliderol Garage Doors. Previously, the ground was named Challenge Recruitment Oval under sponsorship with employment agency Challenge Recruitment.

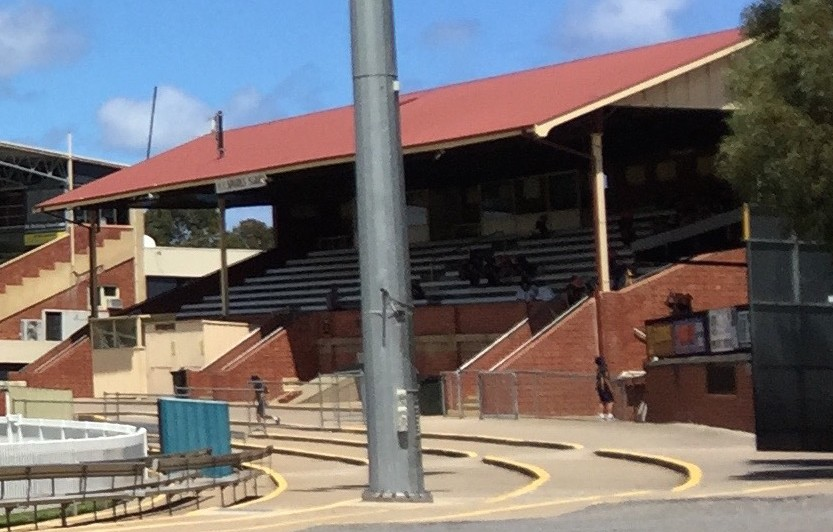
The HY Sparkes Stand pictured in 2016, prior to demolishment one year later

On 28 December 2016, Adelaide was hit by wild storms with heavy rain and high winds. The winds caused damage to Glenelg Oval with the roof of the HY Sparkes Stand blown off into the oval's car park.

On 1 November 2018, Glenelg Oval was renamed ACH Group Stadium as part of a partnership between the football club and co-tenant ACH Group. In November 2022, the oval was renamed Stratarama Stadium as part of a new sponsorship deal for the 2023 season and beyond.

Glenelg Oval hosted the highest ever partnership in Sheffield Shield cricket on 1 November 2020, with Victorian openers Will Pucovski and Marcus Harris combining for 486 runs for the first-wicket stand in a match between South Australia and Victoria.

== Lights ==
After a long legal battle with local residents which resulted in a court win for the Tigers, the Glenelg Football Club had lights installed at the oval in time for the 2012 SANFL season. On 31 March the club christened their newly lit home ground with an 11.13 (79) to 7.15 (57) win over West Adelaide in front of 6,047 fans.

The record night game attendance at Glenelg Oval was set on 25 April (Anzac Day) during Round 4 of the 2014 SANFL season when 9,299 fans saw Glenelg record its first win of the season by defeating the Adelaide Crows SANFL team 17.21 (123) to 13.8 (86).

== Interstate football ==
On Saturday 26 May 2012, Glenelg Oval hosted its first ever Interstate game when South Australia defeated Western Australia by 14 points 15.11 (101) to 13.9 (87). Scores were locked at 11.8 (74) each at three-quarter time, but the Croweaters scored 4.3 (27) to 2.1 (13) in the last quarter to win in front of a disappointing crowd of just 2,843, not helped by predicted rain. The teams were playing for the Haydn Bunton, Jr. Trophy.

== Cricket ==
The venue is used by the Glenelg Cricket Club in the South Australian Grade Cricket League. In October 2013, the venue hosted a Sheffield Shield match, due to the redevelopment of the Adelaide Oval not being completed in time for the start of the season; it was the first Shield match which South Australia has ever hosted away from Adelaide Oval.

On 26 February 2014, the South Australian Cricket Association (SACA) announced that should the Southern Redbacks win the right to host the 2013–14 Sheffield Shield final, scheduled for 21–25 March 2014, the game would be played at Glenelg Oval rather than the Redback's long-time home, the Adelaide Oval. This was due to a date clash as the oval had been pre-booked for a Rolling Stones concert on 22 March.
