= Unley Oval =

Sports venue in Unley, South Australia

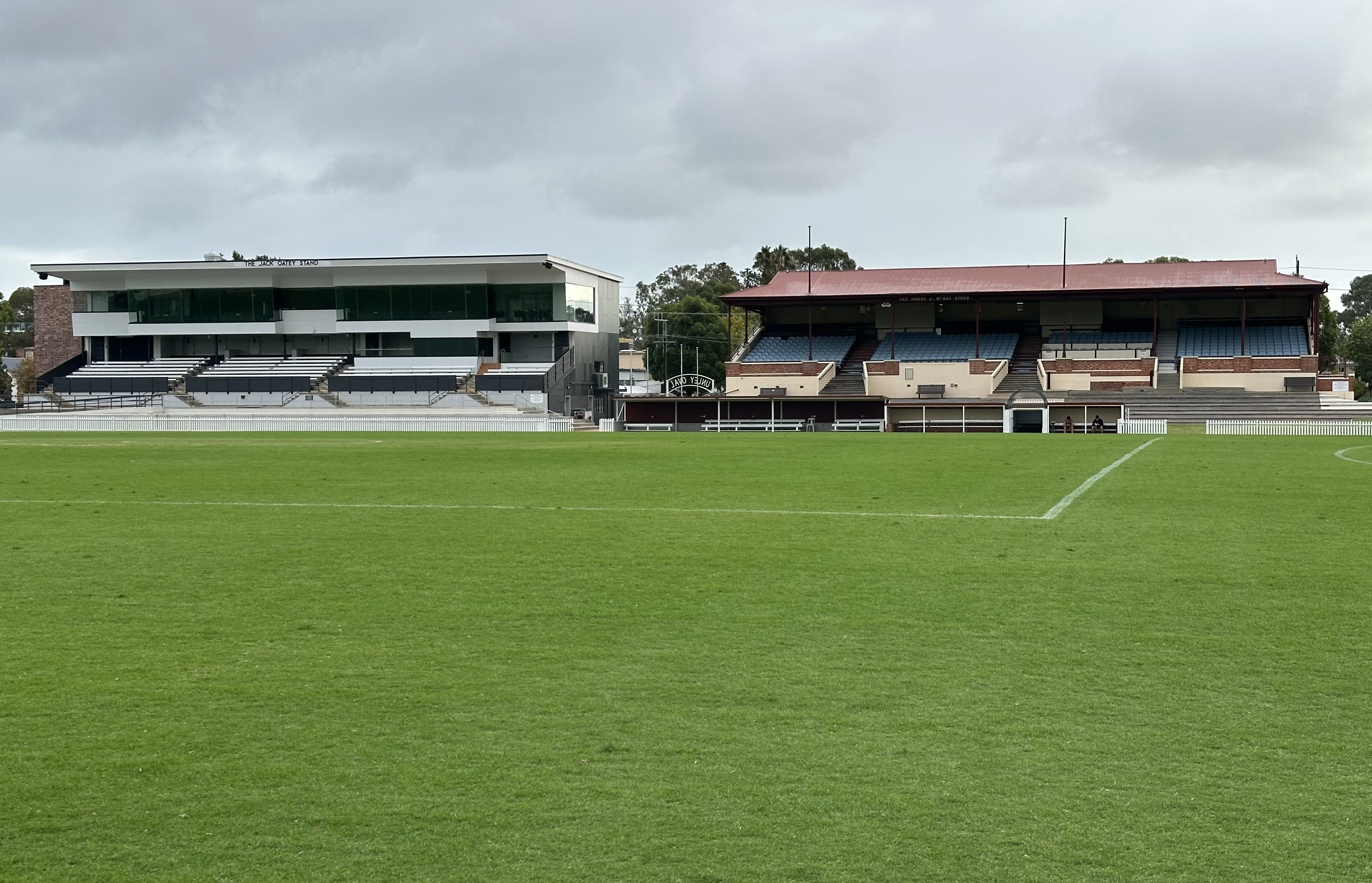
- View of the ground looking toward the Jack Oatey Stand and Harry J. McKay Stand in April 2026
- Interactive map of Unley Oval
- Address: Trimmer Terrace; Unley, South Australia
- Coordinates: 34°57′0″S 138°36′42″E
- Operator: City of Unley
- Capacity: 10,000
- Record attendance: 24,000 – Sturt vs Norwood, 9 June 1924
- Field size: Football: 160m x 115m

Tenants
- Sturt Football Club (1901–1986, 1997–); Forestville Hockey Club (1923–1964)

Ground information

International information
- Only women's Test: 19 January 1979: Australia v New Zealand

Unley Oval (known under naming rights as Thomas Farms Oval) is an Australian rules football and cricket venue in the Adelaide suburb of Unley. It is the home of the Sturt Football Club in the South Australian National Football League (SANFL), while the Sturt Cricket Club also hosts lower-grade matches at the venue.

Originally known as New Parkside Oval, the land (at the time also including the now-Sturt Bowling Club and the Sturt Lawn Tennis Club) was gifted to the community by Edmund Isaac Stephen Trimmer for "sport and public recreation" use.

== Overview ==
The stadium has a capacity of 10,000 people, with seating for up to 2,000. Its record crowd is 24,000 (estimated) attending a SANFL match between Sturt and Norwood on 9 June 1924 – at the time the highest for any suburban oval in Adelaide. The highest verified attendance was 22,015 for a league game against Port Adelaide during the 1968 season. This would stand as the record SANFL attendance at a suburban ground until 22,738 saw Port Adelaide play Norwood at Port's home ground Alberton Oval in 1977.

Unley Oval was the venue of one first-class match between South Australia and Lord Hawke's XI in 1903; until 2013, it was the only first class match that South Australia had ever hosted away from Adelaide Oval until selected Sheffield Shield games were played at Glenelg Oval from 2014. The match itself was remarkable: South Australia won by 97 runs after following on, and two different bowlers (George Thompson and Henry Hay) took nine-wicket innings hauls.

=== Dimensions ===
The dimensions of the playing surface for football are 160m × 115m. The oval is egg-shaped, such that the northern end is more narrow and has shallower pockets than the southern end. Unley Oval has two main grandstands located on the western side of the ground; the newer of the two stands, "The Jack Oatey Stand", is open to the public and seats 1,500, and the Members Stand which seats 500 people.

Unley Oval, like other SANFL club home grounds, is a community-owned facility. However, it stands out for offering greater public access compared to other venues. From 1998, when Sturt Football Club recommenced playing its home games at the Oval, to 2025 temporary fencing was installed on match days — at a cost of over $1 million cumulatively. In 2025, the City of Unley resolved to build a permanent fence around the football ground portion of Unley Oval. This new fence will include public access points and does not affect the existing permanent fencing around the adjacent Bowls Club and Tennis Club. Sturt Football Club has committed an investment of $360,000 towards the project.

=== Naming rights ===
Unley Oval has had several sponsor names during the football season including Envestra Park (2013–2014), House Brothers Oval (2008–2010) and Commander Centre Oval (2011–2012), under various sponsorship deals. In 2015 Unley Oval was renamed Peter Motley Oval in honour of former Sturt champion and club #1 ticket holder Peter Motley. In late 2021, another sponsorship deal was taken changing the name to Wigan Oval until late 2023 when it was changed to Thomas Farms Oval.
