= 1975 SANFL Grand Final =

Glenelg	Norwood
7.10 (52)	9.10 (64)
	1	2	3	4
GLE	1.3 (9)	5.4 (34)	6.7 (43)	7.10 (52)
NOR	3.5 (23)	4.6 (30)	6.9 (45)	9.10 (64)
- Date: Saturday, 27 September (2:10 pm)
- Stadium: Football Park
- Attendance: 53,283
- Umpires: Peter Mead
- Coin toss won by: Norwood
- Kicked toward: Southern End

The 1975 SANFL Grand Final was an Australian rules football game contested between the Norwood Football Club and Glenelg Football Club at Football Park on 27 September 1975. It was the 77th grand final of the South Australian National Football League, staged to determine the premiers for the 1975 SANFL season. The match, attended by 53,283 spectators, was won by Norwood by a margin of 12 points, marking the club's 23rd SANFL premiership and first since 1950.

== Background ==
Norwood finished the home-and-away season on top with 16 wins from 18 games. Glenelg finished second with 15 wins, ahead of Sturt by percentage.

During the finals series, Glenelg beat Sturt in the Qualifying Final by twenty-six points, then advanced directly to the Grand final after beating Norwood in the Second Semi-final by twenty-nine points. Norwood then defeated Port Adelaide, who had thrashed Sturt in the First Semi-Final, in the Preliminary final by thirty points.

== Teams ==
Norwood
B:	22 Michael Gregg	33 Jim Thiel	29 Michael Taylor (v/c)
HB:	35 Rod Pope	25 Stephen Kerley	23 Greg Rix
C:	21 Glen Rosser	26 Rod Seekamp	11 Phil Gallagher
HF:	10 Roger Woodcock	24 Ross Dillon	9 Graeme Dunstan
F:	7 Neil Craig	31 Jim Michalanney	2 Mike Poulter
Foll:	30 Neil Button	28 John Wynne (c)	17 Greg Turbill
Res:	12 Greg Nicholson	27 Mike Olsen	
Coach:	Bob Hammond		

Glenelg
B:	8 Colin Anderson	15 Peter Anderson	10 Rex Voigt
HB:	29 James Rawson	2 Wayne Phillis (v/c)	14 Brian Colbey
C:	3 John MacFarlane	1 Peter Marker (c)	27 Stephen Copping
HF:	28 Paul Weston	5 Peter Carey	7 Adrian Rebbeck
F:	13 Daryl Rady	19 Fred Phillis	22 Neville Caldwell
Foll:	21 Robert Tardif	12 Graham Cornes	24 Kym Hodgeman
Res:	32 Greg Croser	25 Peter McInerney	
Coach:	Neil Kerley		

Kernahan not listed as being in the Glenelg lineup

== Match Summary ==
On a windy day with the ground in good condition, Norwood captain John Wynne won the toss and chose to kick to the Southern End.

=== First quarter ===
In a typically frenetic Grand final opening with players from both sides applying great physical pressure, Norwood appeared unable to take full advantage of the strong breeze, with inaccurate kicking and determined defence from Glenelg's backline resulting in five behinds. But Glenelg were also struggling against the wind, and Fred Phillis, who came into the game on 99 goals for the season, would end up having a very forgettable day; awarded a downfield free kick set shot after Caldwell had been hit after disposing of the ball at the 15-minute mark of the quarter, his kick into the wind was blown off line for a behind. There was added concern for Norwood as several minutes prior, vice-captain and star defender Taylor had been unable to take a free kick after appearing to injure his lower left leg in a seemingly innocuous collision. The first goal of the game came finally at the 17-minute mark when Norwood's Poulter gathered the ball and split the middle with a magnificent long kick.

=== Second quarter ===
Michalanney again scored Norwood's first goal of the term. Although the scores were close, the signs for Glenelg were ominous when early in the second quarter, star forward Kernahan was awarded a free kick 20 metres out from goal almost directly in front, and missed his set shot. Then at the 13-minute mark, veteran ruckman Carey, still hampered by the thigh/groin injury suffered two weeks prior, was awarded a free kick at the top of the goal square, but being forced to kick with his non-preferred left foot, also missed his set shot. It would not be until the approach of time-on that the Bays would eventually score their first major of the term through McInerney, who goaled from a dubiously awarded free kick to register his second for the match. Norwood responded from the restart of play, with McIntosh taking the ball cleanly out of the centre bounce and handballing to the running Fosdike, whose magnificent left foot kick from just outside the centre square carried through. Adler's missed set shot on the half-time siren gave the Redlegs a 22-point lead.

=== Third quarter ===
Norwood were first on the scoreboard four minutes into the second half; after Glenelg had successfully repelled several forays forward by the Redlegs, centreman Gallagher followed up an attacking play that started on the wing when Michael Aish intercepted a handpass from Holst, and steered through his first goal for the game. Glenelg replied almost instantly when a long kick into attack by Seebohm was cleverly knocked forward by Kernahan into the path of the oncoming Lunniss, who slammed through his first goal from point-blank range to bring the margin back to 23 points. The ball then flashed back and forth for several minutes before a chain of Norwood handpasses found Neagle in the goalsquare for his third major. The Tigers again squandered several chances in front of goal before Kernahan finally converted his first set shot for the game 15 minutes into the quarter after being awarded a questionable mark. With Glenelg in need of fresh legs, Farquhar replaced Holst and was soon into the action, finding Kernahan with a nice pass. From nearly the same position he had kicked his first goal barely a minute earlier, his set shot was off target, registering his third behind. Norwood made the Bays pay for their inaccuracy, extending the margin back out to 27 points at the 19-minute mark when Andrew Aish steered through his first goal after a messy passage of play. Glenelg were desperate to stay in the contest, and after a scramble from the centre bounce led to a rushed behind, Duthy, who had been one of the Tigers' best in the quarter, gathered possession from Winter's kick-in and found Lunniss in the forward pocket. He registered his second goal for the game with an accurate set shot to reduce the margin back to 20 points. Moments later, Carey had another opportunity to further reduce Norwood's lead. This time, he attempted a set shot with his right foot, and his wobbly kick hit the post.
The 19-point margin would end up being as close as the Tigers got for the remainder of the match. As time-on began, Jenkins at full speed intercepted an attempted pass to McGuinness by Cornes and set off on a long run down the wing, bouncing the ball five times, but his centering pass was cut off by Marshall whose misdirected handpass trickled over the boundary line. From the throw-in, the ball came to Andrew Aish whose high kick into attack was well marked by Roberts contesting with MacFarlane. From a tight angle in the pocket, he kicked his second goal. Glenelg had one final foray into attack when McGuinness' long shot at goal fell just short and was rushed through. The siren sounded shortly after with Norwood leading by 24 points.

=== Fourth quarter ===
Having benefited from the week's break, the Redlegs pressed home their advantage. Two minutes in, Michael Aish kicked his first goal for the game, trapping the ball brilliantly under pressure in the goalsquare before picking it up and snapping it through. Neagle followed up with his fourth, chasing a desperate exit handpass from Farquhar and using his body smartly to bump MacFarlane out of the way before collecting the ball and finishing with a classy snap off his left boot. Moments later, Thiel's long kick into attack was crumbed by Andrew Aish who fired off a quick handpass to Neagle. He steadied and kicked truly to bring up his fifth goal and with barely five minutes having elapsed in the final term, the margin had blown out to 43 points. The Tigers finally registered their first score for the term at the nine-minute mark when Lunniss smothered Winter's clearing kick from defence after he had taken a great contested mark. Going back after the ball Lunniss' screwed his punt kick towards the goalsquare, where Symonds took a clever mark and kicked his first goal to give Glenelg a faint glimmer of hope.

That hope was soon snuffed out. Keith Thomas ran on a grubby kick forward by Neagle, picking up the ball cleanly, taking a bounce and gathering pace with Cornes in vain pursuit before steadying and kicking a magnificent running goal. After successive behinds from Glenelg, McIntosh lobbed an easy pass to Jenkins, who had drifted unmarked into the forward pocket. McInerney's light push on Jenkins after the mark was enough for the umpire to award a 15-metre penalty, and from the set shot Jenkins made no mistake. At the 20-minute mark, Norwood made it three in a row after skipper Turbill spun out of an attempted tackle and found Neagle on his own in the forward pocket. From the set shot, Neagle steered through his sixth goal to push the lead to 56 points, and the game as a contest was effectively over. Running on empty, Glenelg mustered enough fight to get back a goal through Carey, but Norwood replied almost instantly when Keith Thomas' kick into attack was read superbly by Michael Aish, who took a courageous diving mark and then steered through his second goal. As time-on neared, Andrew Aish joined his younger brother on two goals, combining with Roberts in a one-two handpass maneuver to push the margin beyond 60 points. Fittingly, it was the Norwood captain Turbill who put the icing on the cake - with his 23rd kick for the game, he brought up the Redlegs' ninth goal for the quarter. All Glenelg could do was add some late respectability to the score; Lunniss brought up his third goal, and then Carey was paid a free for kicking in danger, only to handpass to McDermott who missed from point-blank range, a passage of play which summarized Glenelg's dirty afternoon. The siren sounded shortly afterward to put the Tigers out of their misery and crown Norwood as deserving premiers of the season.

=== Aftermath ===
At the time, the win was Norwood's biggest and also their highest score. Half-back flanker Danny Jenkins was awarded the Jack Oatey Medal for his outstanding display of rebounding football. Other players to shine for the Redlegs included youngsters Garry McIntosh and Rick Neagle, acting captain Greg Turbill, who played through the pain of a broken rib and torn finger ligament.

In his match report for the Sunday Mail, chief football writer Ashley Porter praised Norwood's total team effort:

Norwood's teamwork was impeccable, its approach on the ball fierce and relentless. Every player produced discipline over four quarters. Its ability to outscore Glenelg against the wind in the first and third quarters was a reflection of the outstanding efforts by its defence.

Although victorious coach Neil Balme was credited as the second Victorian after Mike Patterson to win an SANFL premiership, he promptly corrected Bruce McAvaney on the live telecast post-match interview, reminding him that he was originally from Western Australia.

In the end, the toll of three hard-fought finals matches (and a six-day break before the Grand final) was telling on the Glenelg players. Captain Weston, who had been ill with influenza, was well below his best, along with several other key players for the Bays. To rub salt into the wound, it had been his fifth losing Grand final with Glenelg. Kevin Sheedy would use this fact to spur Weston when he played in the 1984 VFL Grand Final and finally tasted premiership success at Essendon.

== Scorecard ==
1982 SANFL Grand final
27 September (2:10 pm)	Norwood	def.	Glenelg	Football Park (crowd: 53,283)	Report
1.5 (11); 7.5 (47); 11.8 (74); 20.13 (133)	Q1; Q2; Q3; Final	0.2 (2); 3.7 (25); 6.14 (50); 9.17 (71)	Umpires: Mead; Television broadcast: Nine Network
Poulter 1	Goals	3 Lunniss; 2 McInerney; 1 Holst, Kernahan, Symonds, Carey
Button, Seekamp, Neagle, Turbill, M. Aish, K. Thomas, Winter, Stemper, Thiel	Best	Cornes, Maynard, Marshall, Carey, Frost, McInerney
G. Thomas (possible broken rib), M. Aish (cut chin), A. Aish (cut head)	Injuries	Weston (cut forehead)
Nil	Reports	Nil
This was Norwood's first premiership in 25 years
