= 1983 SANFL season =

Season of South Australian National Football League

- Teams: 10
- Premiers: West Adelaide; 8th premiership
- Minor premiers: West Adelaide; 2nd minor premiership
- Pre-season cup: West Torrens
- Magarey Medallist: Tony Antrobus; North Adelaide (35 votes)
- Ken Farmer Medallist: Rick Davies; Sturt (151 Goals)

Attendance
- Matches played: 116
- Total attendance: 976,555 (8,419 per match)
- Highest: 47,129 (Grand Final, West Adelaide vs. Sturt)

The 1983 South Australian National Football League season was the 104th, since 1877, of the South Australian National Football League (SANFL) Australian rules football competition.

The season commenced on Saturday 2 April 1983, and concluded on Saturday 1 October 1983 with the SANFL Grand Final at Football Park with West Adelaide defeating Sturt by 34 points to claim their eighth premiership and first since 1961.

== Escort Cup ==
Concurrently with the early rounds of the premiership season, the SANFL also ran the Escort Cup night competition with games usually being played mid-week. The Grand Final of the Cup, played under lights at the Thebarton Oval, saw West Torrens win their first competition since they won the 1953 SANFL Grand Final when they defeated South Adelaide 7.15 (57) to 5.7 (37).

With Football Park having lights installed before the 1984 SANFL season, this would be the final time that the night competition would be held at the suburban grounds of Thebarton and Norwood Oval's. From 1984 all night competition games would be held at the league's headquarters. Night football would not return to suburban grounds until the early 2000s when some Norwood home games were played under lights at Norwood Oval.

== Premiership season ==
Highlights of the season fixture include:

- A 22-round home and away competition
- A Grand Final rematch between Norwood and Glenelg, to be played on 25 April (Anzac Day) at Football Park
- South Adelaide also hosted Sturt on Anzac Day at the Adelaide Oval.

=== Round 1 ===
	Round 1
Saturday 2 April (2:10 pm)	Port Adelaide 19.19 (133)	def.	Glenelg 17.16 (118)	Football Park (crowd: 19,055)
Saturday 2 April (2:10 pm)	West Adelaide 23.22 (160)	def.	Central District 8.10 (58)	Richmond Oval (crowd: 7,113)
Saturday 2 April (2:10 pm)	Woodville 13.24 (102)	def. by	West Torrens 18.19 (127)	Woodville Oval (crowd: 6,019)
Saturday 2 April (2:10 pm)	North Adelaide 14.9 (93)	def.	South Adelaide 7.18 (60)	Prospect Oval (crowd: 4,844)
Monday 4 April (2:10 pm)	Sturt 12.14 (86)	def.	Norwood 11.7 (73)	Football Park (crowd: 18,309)
For the first time since 1980, football was played at Football Park on Easter Monday

=== Round 2 ===
	Round 2
Saturday 9 April (2:10 pm)	Central District 20.23 (143)	def.	North Adelaide 8.12 (60)	Football Park (crowd: 5,065)
Saturday 9 April (2:10 pm)	South Adelaide 17.12 (114)	def.	West Torrens 9.12 (66)	Adelaide Oval (crowd: 4,601)
Saturday 9 April (2:10 pm)	Port Adelaide 15.11 (101)	def. by	Norwood 17.6 (108)	Alberton Oval (crowd: 8,338)
Saturday 9 April (2:10 pm)	Sturt 22.8 (140)	def.	Glenelg 12.11 (83)	Unley Oval (crowd: 7,232)
Saturday 9 April (2:10 pm)	West Adelaide 21.22 (148)	def.	Woodville 15.7 (97)	Richmond Oval (crowd: 2,618)

=== Round 3 ===
	Round 3
Saturday 16 April (2:10 pm)	West Adelaide 29.13 (187)	def.	Glenelg 23.11 (149)	Football Park (crowd: N/A)
Saturday 16 April (2:10 pm)	Norwood 17.12 (114)	def.	Central District 14.14 (98)	Norwood Oval (crowd: N/A)
Saturday 16 April (2:10 pm)	Woodville 6.7 (43)	def. by	South Adelaide 19.21 (135)	Woodville Oval (crowd: N/A)
Saturday 16 April (2:10 pm)	North Adelaide 14.17 (101)	def. by	West Torrens 15.15 (105)	Prospect Oval (crowd: N/A)
Sunday 17 April (2:10 pm)	Port Adelaide 18.23 (131)	def.	Sturt 15.11 (101)	Football Park (crowd: N/A)

=== Round 4 ===
	Round 4
Saturday 23 April (2:10 pm)	Woodville 10.13 (73)	def. by	North Adelaide 25.15 (165)	Football Park (crowd: N/A)
Saturday 23 April (2:10 pm)	Central District 12.10 (82)	def. by	Port Adelaide 16.8 (104)	Elizabeth Oval (crowd: N/A)
Saturday 23 April (2:10 pm)	West Torrens 14.10 (94)	def. by	West Adelaide 18.17 (125)	Thebarton Oval (crowd: N/A)
Monday 25 April (2:10 pm)	Norwood 29.14 (188)	def.	Glenelg 12.12 (84)	Football Park (crowd: N/A)
Monday 25 April (2:10 pm)	South Adelaide 13.17 (95)	def. by	Sturt 15.15 (105)	Adelaide Oval (crowd: N/A)

=== Round 5 ===
	Round 5
Saturday 30 April (2:10 pm)	South Adelaide 13.13 (91)	def. by	Port Adelaide 15.11 (101)	Football Park (crowd: N/A)
Saturday 30 April (2:10 pm)	Central District 16.17 (113)	def.	Woodville 11.10 (76)	Elizabeth Oval (crowd: N/A)
Saturday 30 April (2:10 pm)	Glenelg 12.19 (91)	def. by	North Adelaide 14.17 (101)	Glenelg Oval (crowd: N/A)
Saturday 30 April (2:10 pm)	West Torrens 15.17 (107)	def. by	Sturt 20.17 (137)	Thebarton Oval (crowd: N/A)
Sunday 1 May (2:10 pm)	West Adelaide 14.16 (100)	def. by	Norwood 16.6 (102)	Richmond Oval (crowd: N/A)

=== Round 6 ===
	Round 6
Saturday 7 May (2:10 pm)	Glenelg 15.16 (106)	def. by	West Torrens 13.11 (89)	Football Park (crowd: N/A)
Saturday 7 May (2:10 pm)	South Adelaide 19.16 (130)	def.	Central District 12.6 (78)	Adelaide Oval (crowd: N/A)
Saturday 7 May (2:10 pm)	Port Adelaide 16.17 (113)	def. by	West Adelaide 22.16 (148)	Alberton Oval (crowd: N/A)
Saturday 7 May (2:10 pm)	North Adelaide 20.15 (135)	def.	Norwood 13.10 (88)	Prospect Oval (crowd: N/A)
Saturday 7 May (2:10 pm)	Sturt 24.19 (163)	def.	Woodville 16.9 (105)	Unley Oval (crowd: N/A)

=== Round 7 ===
	Round 7
Saturday 14 May (2:10 pm)	Sturt 12.10 (82)	def. by	Central District 23.11 (149)	Football Park (crowd: N/A)
Saturday 14 May (2:10 pm)	Glenelg 7.12 (54)	def. by	Woodville 16.13 (109)	Glenelg Oval (crowd: N/A)
Saturday 14 May (2:10 pm)	Norwood 13.10 (88)	def.	South Adelaide 10.5 (65)	Norwood Oval (crowd: N/A)
Saturday 14 May (2:10 pm)	Port Adelaide 15.16 (106)	def.	West Torrens 10.15 (75)	Alberton Oval (crowd: N/A)
Saturday 14 May (2:10 pm)	West Adelaide 15.16 (106)	def.	North Adelaide 12.12 (84)	Richmond Oval (crowd: N/A)
Woodville defeating Glenelg left the Tigers as the only side without a win so far in 1983

=== State of Origin Game ===
	1983 State Game
Monday 16 May (2:10 pm)	SANFL 26.16 (172)	def.	VFL 17.14 (116)	Football Park (crowd: 42,521)
Fos Williams Medal (SANFL): Michael Aish (Norwood); This was South Australia's first win over Victoria in Adelaide since 1965

=== Round 8 ===
	Round 8
Saturday 21 May (2:10 pm)	West Adelaide 17.14 (116)	def. by	Sturt 29.16 (190)	Football Park (crowd: N/A)
Saturday 21 May (2:10 pm)	South Adelaide 20.13 (133)	def.	Glenelg 7.15 (57)	Adelaide Oval (crowd: N/A)
Saturday 21 May (2:10 pm)	Central District 25.13 (163)	def.	West Torrens 16.14 (110)	Elizabeth Oval (crowd: N/A)
Saturday 21 May (2:10 pm)	Woodville 14.10 (94)	def. by	Norwood 26.6 (162)	Woodville Oval (crowd: N/A)
Saturday 21 May (2:10 pm)	North Adelaide 19.11 (125)	def. by	Port Adelaide 21.7 (133)	Prospect Oval (crowd: N/A)
Rick Davies kicked a Sturt club record 15 goals in their 74 point win over West Adelaide. This remains the last time a SANFL player has kicked 15 or more goals in a match.; On the Tuesday before Round 8 (17 May), Glenelg sacked coach Graham Campbell, but re-hired him the following day

=== Round 9 ===
	Round 9
Saturday 28 May (2:10 pm)	Glenelg 15.21 (111)	def.	Central District 7.10 (52)	Glenelg Oval (crowd: N/A)
Saturday 28 May (2:10 pm)	Sturt 23.25 (163)	def.	North Adelaide 10.14 (74)	Unley Oval (crowd: N/A)
Saturday 28 May (2:10 pm)	West Torrens 14.7 (91)	def.	Norwood 13.10 (88)	Thebarton Oval (crowd: N/A)
Saturday 28 May (2:10 pm)	West Adelaide 13.17 (95)	def.	South Adelaide 6.8 (44)	Richmond Oval (crowd: N/A)
Sunday 29 May (2:10 pm)	Port Adelaide 11.17 (83)	def. by	Woodville 15.11 (101)	Football Park (crowd: N/A)
1982 Grand Finalist Glenelg won their first game of 1983; West Adelaide failed to top 100 points for the only time in 1983

=== Round 10 ===
	Round 10
Saturday 4 June (2:10 pm)	West Torrens 22.15 (147)	def. by	Woodville 23.13 (151)	Football Park (crowd: N/A)
Saturday 4 June (2:10 pm)	South Adelaide 19.13 (127)	def.	North Adelaide 12.15 (87)	Adelaide Oval (crowd: N/A)
Saturday 4 June (2:10 pm)	Central District 13.13 (91)	def. by	West Adelaide 20.13 (133)	Elizabeth Oval (crowd: N/A)
Saturday 4 June (2:10 pm)	Norwood 20.11 (131)	def. by	Sturt 21.12 (138)	Norwood Oval (crowd: N/A)
Saturday 4 June (2:10 pm)	Port Adelaide 14.12 (96)	def. by	Glenelg 15.11 (101)	Alberton Oval (crowd: N/A)
In an incredible finish, Sturt came from 5 goals down going into time-on in the final quarter to defeat Norwood by 7 points.

=== State Game ===
	1983 State Game
Saturday 4 June (2:10 pm)	WAFL 20.14 (134)	def.	SANFL 16.14 (110)	Subiaco Oval (Perth) (crowd: N/A)
Fos Williams Medal (SANFL): Craig Williams (West Adelaide); Sandover Medal (WAFL): Stephen Michael (South Fremantle)

=== Round 11 ===
	Round 11
Saturday 11 June (2:10 pm)	Central District 16.8 (104)	def. by	North Adelaide 18.16 (124)	Elizabeth Oval (crowd: N/A)
Saturday 11 June (2:10 pm)	Woodville 13.7 (85)	def. by	West Adelaide 29.18 (192)	Woodville Oval (crowd: N/A)
Sunday 12 June (2:10 pm)	Sturt 17.12 (114)	def.	Glenelg 15.18 (108)	Football Park (crowd: N/A)
Monday 13 June (11:30 am)	South Adelaide 20.22 (142)	def.	West Torrens 11.8 (74)	Football Park (crowd: N/A)
Monday 13 June (2:10 pm)	Port Adelaide 14.11 (95)	def.	Norwood 14.9 (93)	Football Park (crowd: N/A)
Round 11 saw the first ever double header at Football Park on the Queen's Birthday holiday

=== Round 12 ===
	Round 12
Saturday 18 June (2:10 pm)	Central District 14.15 (99)	def. by	Norwood 16.7 (103)	Football Park (crowd: N/A)
Saturday 18 June (2:10 pm)	South Adelaide 26.22 (178)	def.	Woodville 17.6 (108)	Adelaide Oval (crowd: N/A)
Saturday 18 June (2:10 pm)	Glenelg 19.20 (134)	def.	West Adelaide 19.8 (122)	Glenelg Oval (crowd: N/A)
Saturday 18 June (2:10 pm)	Sturt 28.26 (194)	def.	Port Adelaide 12.8 (80)	Unley Oval (crowd: N/A)
Saturday 18 June (2:10 pm)	West Torrens 14.10 (94)	def. by	North Adelaide 28.19 (187)	Thebarton Oval (crowd: N/A)
Sturt's score was the highest conceded by Port to that point and still the second-highest on record

=== Round 13 ===
	Round 13
Saturday 25 June (2:10 pm)	Sturt 12.12 (84)	def. by	South Adelaide 7.12 (54)	Football Park (crowd: N/A)
Saturday 2 July (2:10 pm)	Glenelg 12.16 (88)	def.	Norwood 10.15 (75)	Glenelg Oval (crowd: N/A)
Saturday 25 June (2:10 pm)	Port Adelaide 13.7 (85)	def. by	Central District 16.12 (108)	Alberton Oval (crowd: N/A)
Saturday 25 June (2:10 pm)	North Adelaide 20.15 (135)	def.	Woodville 17.11 (113)	Prospect Oval (crowd: N/A)
Sunday 26 June (2:10 pm)	West Adelaide 29.16 (190)	def.	West Torrens 13.9 (87)	Football Park (crowd: N/A)

=== Round 14 ===
	Round 14
Saturday 2 July (2:10 pm)	Central District 22.11 (143)	def.	Woodville 14.13 (97)	Football Park (crowd: N/A)
Saturday 25 June (2:10 pm)	Norwood 15.8 (98)	def. by	West Adelaide 21.14 (140)	Norwood Oval (crowd: N/A)
Saturday 2 July (2:10 pm)	Sturt 30.25 (205)	def.	West Torrens 10.12 (72)	Unley Oval (crowd: N/A)
Saturday 2 July (2:10 pm)	Port Adelaide 23.7 (145)	def.	South Adelaide 10.9 (69)	Alberton Oval (crowd: N/A)
Saturday 2 July (2:10 pm)	North Adelaide 14.14 (98)	def.	Glenelg 16.14 (110)	Prospect Oval (crowd: N/A)

=== Round 15 ===
	Round 15
Saturday 9 July (2:10 pm)	Norwood 18.9 (117)	def.	North Adelaide 7.8 (50)	Norwood Oval (crowd: N/A)
Saturday 9 July (2:10 pm)	West Torrens 18.14 (122)	def.	Glenelg 16.9 (105)	Thebarton Oval (crowd: N/A)
Saturday 9 July (2:10 pm)	West Adelaide 15.15 (105)	def.	Port Adelaide 15.14 (104)	Richmond Oval (crowd: N/A)
Saturday 9 July (2:10 pm)	Woodville 11.15 (81)	def. by	Sturt 29.22 (196)	Woodville Oval (crowd: N/A)
Sunday 10 July (2:10 pm)	Central District 4.11 (35)	def. by	South Adelaide 18.14 (122)	Football Park (crowd: N/A)
Central District's score of 4.11 (35) against South Adelaide was the lowest recorded score of the 1983 season

=== Round 16 ===
	Round 16
Saturday 16 July (2:10 pm)	Central District 15.16 (106)	def. by	Sturt 19.8 (122)	Football Park (crowd: N/A)
Saturday 16 July (2:10 pm)	West Torrens 20.14 (134)	def.	Port Adelaide 16.9 (105)	Thebarton Oval (crowd: N/A)
Saturday 16 July (2:10 pm)	Woodville 15.10 (100)	def. by	Glenelg 17.18 (120)	Woodville Oval (crowd: N/A)
Saturday 16 July (2:10 pm)	North Adelaide 18.16 (124)	def. by	West Adelaide 30.11 (191)	Prospect Oval (crowd: N/A)
Sunday 17 July (2:10 pm)	South Adelaide 16.15 (111)	def.	Norwood 12.7 (79)	Football Park (crowd: N/A)

=== Round 17 ===
	Round 17
Saturday 23 July (2:10 pm)	Central District 21.17 (143)	def.	West Torrens 10.13 (73)	Football Park (crowd: N/A)
Saturday 23 July (2:10 pm)	Glenelg 12.13 (85)	def. by	South Adelaide 17.14 (116)	Glenelg Oval (crowd: N/A)
Saturday 23 July (2:10 pm)	Norwood 32.19 (211)	def.	Woodville 11.12 (78)	Norwood Oval (crowd: N/A)
Saturday 23 July (2:10 pm)	Port Adelaide 15.9 (99)	def. by	North Adelaide 22.15 (147)	Alberton Oval (crowd: N/A)
Saturday 23 July (2:10 pm)	Sturt 16.23 (119)	def. by	West Adelaide 21.17 (143)	Unley Oval (crowd: N/A)
Sturt full forward Rick Davies kicked his 100th goal for the season in Rd.17

=== Round 18 ===
	Round 18
Saturday 30 July (2:10 pm)	Sturt 19.14 (128)	def.	North Adelaide 15.12 (102)	Football Park (crowd: N/A)
Saturday 30 July (2:10 pm)	South Adelaide 16.8 (104)	def. by	West Adelaide 20.11 (131)	Adelaide Oval (crowd: N/A)
Saturday 30 July (2:10 pm)	Norwood 20.7 (127)	def.	West Torrens 11.13 (79)	Norwood Oval (crowd: N/A)
Saturday 30 July (2:10 pm)	Woodville 10.10 (70)	def. by	Port Adelaide 13.15 (93)	Woodville Oval (crowd: N/A)
Sunday 31 July (2:10 pm)	Central District 13.13 (91)	def. by	Glenelg 17.17 (119)	Elizabeth Oval (crowd: N/A)

=== Round 19 ===
	Round 19
Saturday 6 August (2:10 pm)	Central District 14.8 (92)	def. by	West Adelaide 22.16 (148)	Football Park (crowd: N/A)
Saturday 6 August (2:10 pm)	Sturt 19.19 (123)	def. by	Norwood 22.8 (140)	Unley Oval (crowd: N/A)
Saturday 13 August (2:10 pm)	South Adelaide 13.13 (91)	def. by	North Adelaide 15.16 (106)	Football Park (crowd: N/A)
Saturday 13 August (2:10 pm)	Glenelg 23.20 (158)	def.	Port Adelaide 8.15 (63)	Glenelg Oval (crowd: N/A)
Sunday 14 August (2:10 pm)	West Torrens 25.17 (167)	def.	Woodville 20.13 (133)	Thebarton Oval (crowd: N/A)
First split round of the 1983 season

=== Round 20 ===
	Round 20
Saturday 20 August (2:10 pm)	Glenelg 20.19 (139)	def.	Sturt 16.16 (112)	Glenelg Oval (crowd: N/A)
Saturday 20 August (2:10 pm)	West Torrens 12.9 (81)	def. by	South Adelaide 24.15 (159)	Thebarton Oval (crowd: N/A)
Saturday 20 August (2:10 pm)	North Adelaide 20.13 (133)	def. by	Central District 21.16 (142)	Prospect Oval (crowd: N/A)
Sunday 21 August (11:30 am)	Woodville 19.14 (128)	def. by	West Adelaide 34.17 (221)	Football Park (crowd: N/A)
Sunday 21 August (2:10 pm)	Norwood 25.15 (165)	def.	Port Adelaide 15.13 (103)	Football Park (crowd: N/A)
West Adelaide's score of 34.17 (221) against Woodville was the highest recorded score of the 1983 season

=== Round 21 ===
	Round 21
Saturday 27 August (2:10 pm)	West Torrens 13.13 (91)	def. by	North Adelaide 17.19 (121)	Football Park (crowd: N/A)
Saturday 27 August (2:10 pm)	South Adelaide 18.12 (120)	def. by	Woodville 19.16 (130)	Adelaide Oval (crowd: N/A)
Saturday 27 August (2:10 pm)	Central District 14.11 (95)	def. by	Norwood 21.10 (136)	Elizabeth Oval (crowd: N/A)
Saturday 27 August (2:10 am)	Port Adelaide 18.8 (116)	def. by	Sturt 23.15 (153)	Alberton Oval (crowd: N/A)
Saturday 27 August (2:10 pm)	West Adelaide 27.17 (179)	def.	Glenelg 16.9 (105)	Richmond Oval (crowd: N/A)
West Adelaide full-forward Roger Luders kicks 11 goals, the most by any West Adelaide player since Hubert Langton kicked 12 against North Adelaide in 1941; Norwood full forward Neville Roberts kicked his 100th goal for the season in Round 21, becoming the second Norwood player to do so after Bruce Schultz in 1941

=== Round 22 ===
	Round 22
Saturday 3 September (2:10 pm)	Port Adelaide 17.15 (117)	def.	Central District 14.16 (100)	Football Park (crowd: N/A)
Saturday 3 September (2:10 pm)	Norwood 22.10 (142)	def.	Glenelg 11.19 (85)	Norwood Oval (crowd: N/A)
Saturday 3 September (2:10 pm)	Sturt 26.11 (167)	def.	South Adelaide 12.13 (85)	Unley Oval (crowd: N/A)
Saturday 3 September (2:10 am)	West Adelaide 15.22 (112)	def. by	West Torrens 17.13 (115)	Richmond Oval (crowd: N/A)
Saturday 3 September (2:10 pm)	Woodville 12.13 (85)	def. by	North Adelaide 25.17 (167)	Woodville Oval (crowd: N/A)

== Ladder ==
1983 SANFL Ladder
Pos	Team	Pld	W	L	D	PF	PA	PP	Pts
1	West Adelaide (P)	22	18	4	0	3192	2317	57.94	36
2	Sturt	22	16	6	0	3022	2273	57.07	32
3	Norwood	22	14	8	0	2628	2138	55.14	28
4	South Adelaide	22	12	10	0	2388	2038	53.95	24
5	North Adelaide	22	11	11	0	2519	2454	50.65	22
6	Port Adelaide	22	10	12	0	2306	2546	47.53	20
7	Glenelg	22	9	13	0	2310	2622	46.84	18
8	Central District	22	8	14	0	2225	2416	47.94	16
9	West Torrens	22	8	14	0	2260	2922	43.61	16
10	Woodville	22	4	18	0	2116	3240	39.51	8

Rules for classification: 1) points; 2) percentage; 3) number of points for.
(P) Premiers

== Finals series ==
=== Elimination Final ===
	Elimination Final
Saturday 10 September (2:10 pm)	South Adelaide 14.9 (93)	def. by	North Adelaide 20.13 (133)	Football Park (crowd: N/A)

=== Qualifying Final ===
	Qualifying Final
Sunday 11 September (2:10 pm)	Sturt 12.14 (86)	def. by	Norwood 13.12 (90)	Football Park (crowd: 27,395)

=== First Semi Final ===
	First Semi Final
Saturday 17 September (2:10 pm)	Sturt 24.7 (151)	def.	North Adelaide 13.12 (90)	Football Park (crowd: 25,805)

=== Second Semi Final ===
	Second Semi Final
Saturday 18 September (2:10 pm)	West Adelaide 24.16 (160)	def.	Norwood 13.8 (86)	Football Park (crowd: 30,341)
By kicking seven goals, Roger Luders becomes the first West Adelaide player to kick 100 goals in a season

=== Preliminary Final ===
	Preliminary Final
Sunday 25 September (2:40 pm)	Sturt 23.8 (146)	def.	Norwood 15.12 (102)	Football Park (crowd: 30,128)

=== Grand Final ===
1983 SANFL Grand Final
Saturday 1 October (2:10 pm)	West Adelaide	def.	Sturt	Football Park (crowd: 47,129)
2.4 (16); 12.7 (79); 15.10 (100); 21.16 (142)	Q1; Q2; Q3; Final	3.4 (22); 7.7 (49); 12.11 (83); 16.12 (108)	Umpires: Laurie Argent, Rick Kinnear; Jack Oatey Medal: Ian Borchard (West Adelaide); Television broadcast: Seven
5: Lindner; 4: Luders, Grosser; 3: Meuret; 2: Morris; 1: Conlen, Smith, Borchard	Goals	4: Graham; 2: Davies, Motley
Borchard, Morris, Bennett, Meuret, Grosser	Best	Graham, Motley, Howard
This was West Adelaide's first premiership since 1961.

== Awards and premiers ==
=== Awards ===
- The Magarey Medal (awarded to the best and fairest player in the home and away season) was won by Tony Antrobus of North Adelaide, who polled 35 votes.
- The Ken Farmer Medal (awarded to the leading goalkicker in the home and away season) was won by Rick Davies of Sturt. He kicked 151 goals in the 1983 home and away season.
- West Adelaide were the league minor premiers, finishing top of the ladder at the end of the home and away season with 18 wins and 4 losses. It was the club's 2nd minor premiership in the SANFL.

=== Premiers ===
- West Adelaide were the League premiers, defeating Sturt by 34 points.
- Port Adelaide were the Reserves premiers, defeating Norwood

== Leading Goalkickers ==
- Rick Davies (Sturt) – 151 (Note: SANFL record)
- Neville Roberts (Norwood) – 111
- Grenville Dietrich (North Adelaide) – 109
- Roger Luders (West Adelaide) – 105 (Note: first West Adelaide player to kick 100 goals in an SANFL season)
