= 1984 SANFL Grand Final =

1984 Australian rules football final

Port Adelaide	Norwood
13.13 (91)	15.10 (100)
	1	2	3	4
PTA	1.2 (8)	8.7 (55)	11.11 (77)	13.13 (91)
NOR	4.3 (27)	9.5 (59)	11.8 (74)	15.10 (100)
- Date: Sunday, 30 September (2:10 pm)
- Stadium: Football Park
- Attendance: 50,271

The 1984 SANFL Grand Final was an Australian rules football competition. Norwood beat Port Adelaide beat by 100 to 91.

Norwood won their 26th SANFL premiership, their second under coach Neil Balme. The Redlegs are the first team that finished fifth at the end of the home-and-away season to win the SANFL premiership.

== The game ==
The match was played in front of a sell-out crowd in fine conditions.

== Norwood Premiership Team ==
Norwood
B:	22 Bruce Winter	6 Craig Balme	10 Lester Ross, Jr.
HB:	47 Andrew Jarvis	44 Tom Warhurst, Jr.	21 Justin Scanlon (dvc)
C:	11 Phil Gallagher	14 Garry McIntosh	25 Duncan Fosdike
HF:	52 David Payne	31 Jim Michalanney	41 Glen Vardenaga
F:	2 Greg Thomas	15 Peter Laughlin	9 Neville Roberts
Foll:	37 John Hall	8 Michael Aish (vc)	7 Keith Thomas
Res:	5 Neil Hein	3 Danny Jenkins (c)	
Coach:	Neil Balme		
