= Neil Hein =

Australian rules footballer

Personal information
- Full name: Neil Hein
- Born: 6 July 1963 (age 63)
- Original team: Murray Bridge Ramblers (RMFL)
- Draft: 1986 pre-draft selection
- Height: 199 cm (6 ft 6 in)
- Weight: 89 kg (196 lb)
- Position: Ruckman

Playing career^{1}
Years	Club	Games (Goals)
1981–86, 1989	Norwood	140 (49)
1987–1988	Brisbane Bears	15 (12)
Total		155 (61)
- ^{1} Playing statistics correct to the end of 1988.

Career highlights
- 1984 SANFL Premiership

Neil Hein (born 7 June 1963) is a former Australian rules footballer who played with the Brisbane Bears in the Victorian Football League (VFL).

Originally from River Murray Football League club Murray Bridge Ramblers, Hein played in a South Australian National Football League (SANFL) premiership for Norwood in 1984 and played 140 SANFL games with the club during the 1980s. It was from there that he was signed by Brisbane, who secured his services by using a pre-draft selection prior to the 1987 VFL season.

Hein had the distinction of playing in Brisbane's first ever match, against North Melbourne, which they won by 33 points. From his four disposals he kicked two goals to be one of six multiple goal-kickers for the Bears. A ruckman, Hein did not always play in his preferred position due to the presence of Mark Mickan in 1987 and spent a lot of time up forward during his eight appearances that season. He played seven further games in 1988, some of them as first ruckman.

After finishing with Brisbane, Hein returned to Norwood for the 1989 SANFL season before retiring.
