= Neil Button =

Australian rules footballer (born 1952)

Personal information
- Full name: Neil Alexander Button
- Nickname: The Bear
- Born: 28 July 1952 (age 74)
- Original team: Ramblers (RMFL)
- Debut: 29 May 1971, Norwood vs. Central District, at Elizabeth
- Positions: Ruckman (1970s), centre half-forward (1980s)
- Other occupation: Mathematics and physical education teacher

Playing career^{1}
Years	Club	Games (Goals)
1971–1985	Norwood	283 (163)

Representative team honours^{2}
Years	Team	Games (Goals)
1972–1979	South Australia	9 (5)

Coaching career
Years	Club	Games (W–L–D)
1993	VSFL Under-18 (assistant)	
- ^{1} Playing statistics correct to the end of 1985.^{2} Representative statistics correct as of 1979.

Career highlights
- 3× SANFL Premiership player: 1975, 1978, 1982; Ardath Cup: 1977; 4× Advertiser Team of the Year: 1977, 1978, 1979, 1981; 2× State Carnival Representative: 1972, 1979; Norwood vice-captain: 1978, 1979; Norwood Life Member: 1981; Norwood Hall of Fame; Norwood Team of the Century (centre half-forward); 3× Norwood Fairest & Most Brilliant runner-up: 1972, 1978, 1979; Flehr Trophy runner-up (best first-year player): 1971; Meritorious Service Award: 1973, 1981; E.A. Johnson Service Award: 1985

Neil "The Bear" Button (born 28 July 1952) is a former Australian footballer who played for the Norwood Football Club in the South Australian National Football League (SANFL) between 1971 and 1985. He played primarily as a ruckman.

== Career ==
Button was recruited from River Murray Football League club Ramblers in 1970 and debuted the following year against Central District Football Club. He played a total of 283 league games and kicked 163 goals. In addition, Button played 11 reserves matches and 19 under-19 matches and 9 games for South Australia. He retired in 1986.

== Playing style ==
Button played primarily as a ruckman. After a knee injury during the opening of the 1980 Escort Cup, he primarily played as a centre half forward.

== Honours ==
Among other honours, he was named as centre half forward in Norwood’s official ‘Team of the Twentieth Century’, and inducted in the Player Life Members Award in 1981.
