= Jarrod Lienert =

Australian rules footballer (born 1994)

Personal information
- Born: 5 August 1994 (age 32)
- Original team: Imperial Football Club/Sturt
- Draft: 42, 2017 rookie draft
- Debut: 22 July 2018, Port Adelaide vs. Greater Western Sydney, at Adelaide Oval
- Height: 195 cm (6 ft 5 in)
- Weight: 93 kg (205 lb)
- Position: Key defender

Club information
- Current club: St Kilda
- Number: 31

Playing career^{1}
Years	Club	Games (Goals)
2018–2021	Port Adelaide	23 (1)
2022	St Kilda	11 (0)
Total		34 (1)
- ^{1} Playing statistics correct to the end of 2022.

Jarrod Lienert (born 5 August 1994) is a former professional Australian rules footballer that played for the Port Adelaide Football Club and St Kilda Football Club in the Australian Football League (AFL). He made his debut in round 18 of the 2018 season against Greater Western Sydney at Adelaide Oval. Jarrod is the son of Brett Lienert who played 134 games for Sturt.

Lienert played junior football for Imperial Football Club in Murray Bridge, South Australia. He joined South Australian National Football League (SANFL) club Sturt, playing as a utility, and was part of their 2016 premiership. In the same year, he won the SANFL Star Search award as a promising talent. He was drafted by Port Adelaide with pick 42 in the 2017 rookie draft, while studying to become a teacher. In 2017, he played 21 SANFL games as a key defender, including Port Adelaide's one-point grand final loss. He was upgraded to the senior list in August.

In 2018, Lienert showed strong SANFL form before having an arthroscope on his right knee to repair his meniscus, sidelining him for two months. In the lead-up to the match against Greater Western Sydney, coach Ken Hinkley confirmed Lienert would debut, commenting "he probably would've played well before this (if not for the knee surgery) ... he's playing some really strong football".

Lienert was delisted by Port Adelaide at the conclusion of the 2021 AFL season, but was subsequently picked up by St Kilda as part of the supplemental selection period (SSP). Lienert made his St Kilda debut in Round 2, 2022 in the Saints' win against Fremantle. Lienert managed 11 games before getting delisted at the end of the 2022 season.
