= Jim Michalanney =

Australian rules footballer

Personal information
- Full name: James Michalanney
- Original team: Rostrevor College
- Position: Forward

Playing career^{1}
Years	Club	Games (Goals)
1974–1986	Norwood	211 (342)

Representative team honours
Years	Team	Games (Goals)
1977	South Australia	1 (?)
- ^{1} Playing statistics correct to the end of 1986.

Career highlights
- 4× SANFL Premiership player: (1975, 1978, 1982, 1984); Norwood leading goalkicker: (1976); Norwood Hall of Fame

James Michalanney is a former Australian rules footballer who played for the Norwood Football Club in the South Australian National Football League (SANFL).

Known as a tall and strong-marking forward with the nicknames "Big Jim" and "Piano" for his perfect set of white teeth, Michalanney was part of four Norwood premierships. He was forced to miss the whole of the 1980 SANFL season due to a mystery groin complaint which was eventually diagnosed as deep-seated pelvic bone damage. During that time, Michalanney took up croquet at the Norwood Club and won the 1980 South Australian All Grades Doubles Championship, a handicap trophy.

In 1984, he was awarded Life Membership of the Norwood Football Club.

Michalanney worked as a school teacher during his playing days, and later became principal of Murray Bridge High School. He has five children: William, Charlotte, Tom, Max and Jack. His son Max has also become a footballer, selected by the Adelaide Crows with pick 17 of the 2022 AFL Draft.
