= Neville Roberts =

Australian rules footballer

Personal information
- Full name: Neville P. Roberts
- Nickname: Rocky
- Born: 6 March 1955 (age 71)
- Height: 180 cm (5 ft 11 in)
- Weight: 79 kg (174 lb)
- Position: Half-forward

Playing career^{1}
Years	Club	Games (Goals)
1973–74, 1978–81	West Torrens	98 (198)
1975–1977	Richmond	48 (81)
1982–1987	Norwood	108 (413)
Total		254 (692)

Representative team honours
Years	Team	Games (Goals)
1976	Victoria	1 (6)
????−????	South Australia	5 (?)

Coaching career
Years	Club	Games (W–L–D)
2000–2001	Norwood	43 (22–21–0)
- ^{1} Playing statistics correct to the end of 1987.

Career highlights
- 2× SANFL Premiership player: (1982, 1984); West Torrens captain: (1980–1981); Norwood captain: (1985–1986); 4× Norwood leading goalkicker: (1982, 1983, 1984, 1985); Norwood Team of the Century; Norwood Hall of Fame, inducted 2006; South Australian Football Hall of Fame, inducted 2006

Neville P. Roberts (born 6 March 1955) is a former Australian rules footballer who played in the South Australian National Football League (SANFL) and Victorian Football League (VFL). He played with West Torrens, Richmond and Norwood. His interstate career consisted of games for both South Australia (five games) and Victoria (one game). He was South Australian state captain in 1984 and 1985.

== West Torrens (1973–1974) ==
Roberts, a half-forward, played two seasons in his first stint at West Torrens, in 1973 and 1974.

== Richmond (1975–1977) ==
He was signed by Richmond in March 1975, for a fee of $40,000 and made 17 appearances for the VFL club in his debut season, which included three finals. He won the season's Murie Cup as the leading combined votegetter in the seniors Brownlow Medal and reserves Gardiner Medal among players who polled in both.

In 1976, Roberts only managed 13 games due to injury but still managed to kick 20 goals. He also booted six majors for Victoria against Western Australia at Subiaco Oval. He appeared in a further 18 fixtures in 1977, from which he kicked 31 goals, his highest goal tally at Richmond.

== West Torrens (1978–1981) ==
In 1978 he returned to West Torrens and would play four more seasons with the club. He was captain of West Torrens in 1980 and 1981.

== Norwood (1982–1987) ==
Roberts made his way to Norwood in 1982, and moving to full forward he would prove to be a prolific goal-kicker. He topped the Redlegs goal-kicking every year from 1982 to 1985. His 111 goals in 1983 was the first time a Norwood player had kicked over 100 goals in a league season and remains a club record, though as Sturt champion Rick Davies kicked a league record 151 goals in the same year Roberts didn't win the Ken Farmer Medal. Roberts was a member of Norwood's 1982 and 1984 premiership teams, contributing six goals in the 1984 Grand Final. He captained Norwood in 1985 and 1986.

== Coaching ==
In 2000, Roberts was appointed senior coach of Norwood, a job he held for two seasons, in which they finished fourth and fifth respectively.

== Honours ==
He is a forward pocket in Norwood's official Team of the Century and in 2006 was inducted into the South Australian Football Hall of Fame.
