= Lovelock Shield =

The Lovelock Shield, officially known as the Southern Football Championships, was an annual competition held between representative teams from the four leagues in the Southern Zone of South Australian Country Football. The Lovelock Shield was established in 1953 between the Hills Football Association, Hills Central Football Association, Southern Football Association and the Great Southern Football League. The shield was presented by the inaugural president of the Southern Football Championships, Mr. C. K. (Pete) Lovelock.

In 1958, the Southern Football Association left and was replaced by the River Murray Football League. Southern re-joined in 1962 when the Hills Football Association folded. In 1967, the Hills Central Football Association merged with the Torrens Valley Football League to form the Hills Football League and a representative team from this newly formed league replaced Hills Central in the competition.

Other than in the years 1970 and 1971, the Lovelock Shield ran continuously until 1999. It has not been held since.

== Association Records ==
| League | Times Competed | Champions | Runners-up | 3rd | 4th | % Won |
|---|---|---|---|---|---|---|
| Hills Football Association | 9 | 7 | 1 | 1 | 0 | 77.8% |
| River Murray Football League | 40 | 12 | 7 | 13 | 8 | 30.0% |
| Southern Football League | 41 | 12 | 12 | 11 | 6 | 29.3% |
| Great Southern Football League | 45 | 10 | 5 | 10 | 20 | 22.2% |
| Hills Football League | 31 | 3 | 13 | 8 | 7 | 9.7% |
| Hills Central Football League | 14 | 1 | 7 | 2 | 4 | 7.1% |

== Lovelock Shield Results ==
| Year | Champions | Runner-up | 3rd | 4th |
|---|---|---|---|---|
| 1953 | Hills FA | Southern FA | Great Southern FL | Hills Central FL |
| 1954 | Hills FA | Southern FA | Great Southern FL | Hills Central FL |
| 1955 | Hills FA | Southern FA | Great Southern FL | Hills Central FL |
| 1956 | Hills FA | Hills Central FL | Great Southern FL | Southern FA |
| 1957 | Hills FA | Hills Central FL | Southern FA | Great Southern FL |
| 1958 | River Murray FL | Hills FA | Hills Central FL | Great Southern FL |
| 1959 | Hills FA | River Murray FL | Great Southern FL | Hills Central FL |
| 1960 | Hills FA | Hills Central FL | River Murray FL | Great Southern FL |
| 1961 | River Murray FL | Hills Central FL | Hills FA | Great Southern FL |
| 1962 | River Murray FL | Southern FA | Hills Central FL | Great Southern FL |
| 1963 | Southern FA | Hills Central FL | River Murray FL | Great Southern FL |
| 1964 | River Murray FL | Hills Central FL | Southern FL | Great Southern FL |
| 1965 | Hills Central FL | River Murray FL | Southern FL | Great Southern FL |
| 1966 | Southern FL | Hills Central FL | River Murray FL | Great Southern FL |
| 1967 | Southern FL | Hills FL | River Murray FL | Great Southern FL |
| 1968 | Southern FL | Great Southern FL | River Murray FL | Hills FL |
| 1969 | River Murray FL | Hills FL | Great Southern FL | Southern FL |
| 1970 | In recess | | | |
| 1971 | In recess | | | |
| 1972 | Southern FL | Hills FL | Great Southern FL | River Murray FL |
| 1973 | Hills FL | Southern FL | River Murray FL | Great Southern FL |
| 1974 | Southern FL | Hills FL | River Murray FL | Great Southern FL |
| 1975 | Southern FL | River Murray FL | Hills FL | Great Southern FL |
| 1976 | River Murray FL | Hills FL | Southern FL | Great Southern FL |
| 1977 | Southern FL | Hills FL | River Murray FL | Great Southern FL |
| 1978 | Southern FL | River Murray FL | Hills FL | Great Southern FL |
| 1979 | River Murray FL | Southern FL | Great Southern FL | Hills FL |
| 1980 | River Murray FL | Great Southern FL | Southern FL | Hills FL |
| 1981 | Southern FL | Great Southern FL | River Murray FL | Hills FL |
| 1982 | Great Southern FL | Hills FL | River Murray FL | Southern FL |
| 1983 | River Murray FL | Southern FL | Hills FL | Great Southern FL |
| 1984 | Great Southern FL | Hills FL | Southern FL | River Murray FL |
| 1985 | River Murray FL | Great Southern FL | Southern FL | Hills FL |
| 1986 | Great Southern FL | Southern FL | Hills FL | River Murray FL |
| 1987 | Hills FL | River Murray FL | Southern FL | Great Southern FL |
| 1988 | Great Southern FL | River Murray FL | Hills FL | Southern FL |
| 1989 | Great Southern FL | Hills FL | River Murray FL | Southern FL |
| 1990 | River Murray FL | Southern FL | Hills FL | Great Southern FL |
| 1991 | Hills FL | River Murray FL | Great Southern FL | Southern FL |
| 1992 | Southern FL | Great Southern FL | Hills FL | River Murray FL |
| 1993 | Great Southern FL | Hills FL | Southern FL | River Murray FL |
| 1994 | Great Southern FL | Southern FL | Hills FL | River Murray FL |
| 1995 | Great Southern FL | Southern FL | River Murray FL | Hills FL |
| 1996 | Great Southern FL | Hills FL | SouthernFL | River Murray FL |
| 1997 | River Murray FL | Hills FL | Southern FL | Great Southern FL |
| 1998 | Great Southern FL | Southern FL | River Murray FL | Hills FL |
| 1999 | Southern FL | Hills FL | Great Southern FL | River Murray FL |
