= Mervyn Keane =

Australian rules footballer, born 1953

Personal information
- Born: 29 July 1953 (age 73)
- Original team: Wycheproof
- Height: 185 cm (6 ft 1 in)
- Weight: 82.5 kg (13 st 0 lb)

Playing career^{1}
Years	Club	Games (Goals)
1972–1984	Richmond	238 (36)
1985	Sturt	20 (1)
Total		258 (37)

Coaching career^{3}
Years	Club	Games (W–L–D)
1985–88	Sturt (SANFL)	90 (40–49–1)
- ^{1} Playing statistics correct to the end of 1985.^{3} Coaching statistics correct as of 1988.

Career highlights
- Richmond — Premiership Player 1973, 1974, 1980; Richmond — Team of the Century; Richmond — Hall of Fame — inducted 2005

Mervyn Keane (pronounced: "cane") (born 29 July 1953), commonly known as Merv Keane, is a former Australian rules football player and coach who played between 1972 and 1984 for Richmond in the VFL.

Predominantly a back pocket or half-back flanker, Keane later showed his versatility by frequently playing as a ruck-rover. He was generally regarded as one of the most underrated players in the VFL, and did not poll a Brownlow Medal vote in his first ten seasons. Although Keane was in Richmond’s country zone, he mistakenly trained with Melbourne before joining the Tigers.

Despite some trouble settling in, Keane became a vital member of the Tigers’ 1973 premiership side and his solid defensive work was vital for the club as it declined in the period following the resignation of Tom Hafey at the end of the 1976 season. In 1980, Keane moved from defence to fill an on-ball position made vacant by Kevin Bartlett’s permanent move to the forward line and his drive from this position was a valuable part of perhaps the most potent attacking team in League history with over 3,000 points scored. In the Grand Final Keane had 27 possessions and kicked two fine goals, but his 1981 season was wiped out by a serious knee injury requiring a reconstruction.

== Later career ==
Back in defence, Keane was effective as ever in 1982, and he was still playing very well when he was approached by SANFL club Sturt as a playing coach to replace the controversially sacked John Halbert. Keane retired as a player after 1985 but coached the Double Blues for three further seasons. However, during the last two seasons there were constant rumours he would be sacked in favour of a famous past Double Blues player like Paul Bagshaw, Rick Davies or Robert Oatey. On 15 September 1988, the committee controversially sacked Keane after a season in which he had taken the club from ninth to fifth, feeling he had not done enough to sustain the traditions the club had developed under Jack Oatey. Most historians argue that Sturt did not recover from Keane’s sacking until under Phil Carman following an 0–22 season in 1995.

Keane then served as an assistant to his old teammate Kevin Sheedy at Essendon for a few years during the early 1990s, before taking the reins at TAC Cup side the Western Jets. At the Jets, Keane played a key role in the development of such players as Brad Johnson before being appointed to coach a Williamstown club that had finished with a winless record in the same season Sturt did in the SANFL. Keane rebuilt the club, if not to the same extent his former employers were by Carman, and coached Caulfield Grammarians in 2003 and 2004 before returning to assist Sheedy in his last days at Essendon.
