= Jim Thiel =

Australian rules footballer

Personal information
- Full name: James Brenton Thiel
- Born: 24 March 1956; Loxton, South Australia
- Died: 8 September 1986 (aged 30); Adelaide CBD
- Debut: 19th May 1975, Norwood vs. West Adelaide, at AAMI Stadium
- Position: Centre Half Forward

Playing career
Years	Club	Games (Goals)
1975-1984	Norwood	156 (71)

Career highlights
- Grand Final: 1975 & 1982

Jim Thiel was an Australian rules footballer who played in the South Australian National Football League ('SANFL') for the Norwood Football Club from 1975 to 1984. Thiel is remembered as one of the club's greats, making significant contributions to the team, including two premierships. He died at the age of 30 in a building site accident in 1986.

== Early life ==
Jim Thiel was born on 24 March 1956 in Loxton, South Australia. Raised in regional South Australia, he moved to Adelaide in the early 1970s to pursue his football career. He lived at Carmel Court, a shared accommodation provided by Norwood for country recruits, and attended Norwood High School.

== Playing career ==
In his first season, Thiel replaced the injured Ian Stasinowsky during the finals and helped Norwood win the 1975 premiership. His performances that year earned him the club's Best First-Year Player award. Over the next several years, Thiel established himself as a crucial and "highly skilled" part of Norwood's lineup.

He played a pivotal role in Norwood’s second premiership in 1982, and over his career, Thiel played 156 games and kicked 71 goals for the club.

== Injury and retirement ==
Thiel experienced a series of knee injuries, beginning with a severe injury in 1977 that required knee reconstruction. Despite his injuries, Thiel remained one of the SANFL's best centre half forwards until his early retirement in 1984 at the age of 28. His career was cut short by his injuries.

== Legacy ==
Thiel was posthumously awarded Life Membership by the Norwood Football Club in recognition of his service to the team.

== Death ==
Thiel died on 8 September 1986 at the age of 30. He died in a building site accident when a trench collapsed during plumbing work in Adelaide.

== Honors and achievements ==
• Premierships: 1975, 1982 (Norwood Football Club)

• Life membership: Norwood Football Club (Posthumously)
