= Sam Gallagher (Australian rules footballer) =

Australian rules footballer (1926–2019)

Personal information
- Full name: Kevin James Gallagher
- Nickname: Sam
- Born: 22 January 1926
- Died: 16 August 2019 (aged 93)

Playing career
| Years | Club | Games (Goals) |
| 1945–1955 | Norwood | 131 (24) |

Career highlights
- All-Australian team: (1947)

Kevin James Gallagher (22 January 1926 — 16 August 2019) was an Australian rules footballer who played for the Norwood Football Club in the South Australian National Football League (SANFL) and also represented South Australia in interstate football.

His son Philip also played for Norwood.
