= Greg Hutchison =

Australian rules footballer and coach

Personal information
- Full name: Greg Hutchison
- Born: 13 June 1957 (age 69)
- Original team: Chelsea
- Height: 182 cm (6 ft 0 in)
- Weight: 85 kg (187 lb)

Playing career^{1}
Years	Club	Games (Goals)
1975–1984	Melbourne	96 (21)

Coaching career
Years	Club	Games (W–L–D)
1997	Melbourne	13 (3–10–0)
- ^{1} Playing statistics correct to the end of 1984.

Greg Hutchison (born 13 June 1957) is a former Australian rules footballer who played with and coached Melbourne in the AFL.

== Playing career ==
=== Melbourne Football Club ===
Originally from Chelsea Football Club, Hutchinson made his senior VFL debut in 1975 for the Melbourne Football Club and appeared sporadically for the Demons until the early 1980s. Much of his football was played in the reserves but he managed 96 senior games, as a utility.

== Coaching career ==
From 1986 to 1989, Hutchison coached in the VFA with Prahran, steering them to the 1987 second division premiership.

=== Melbourne Football Club ===
In 1997, Hutchison was appointed caretaker senior coach of Melbourne Football Club after their senior coach Neil Balme was sacked mid-season. His side won three of the 13 games that he coached that year and he wasn't reappointed to the position the following season, with Neale Daniher appointed to the position of senior coach of Melbourne Football Club.

=== Other Roles ===
Hutchison then joined Richmond as an assistant coach. In 2008 he was announced as the coach of the Casey Scorpions. He held the position of Football Manager at the St Kilda Football Club under the Ross Lyon regime and was courted to join him at Fremantle Football Club before accepting his current role at the AFL Coaches Association. In 2015 he was announced as the coach of Old Brighton Football Club in the Victorian Amateur Football Association, leading them to premiership success in 2017 over Old Scotch.
