= John Seebohm =

Personal information
- Born: 6 April 1960 (age 66); Mount Burr, South Australia
- Height: 191 cm (6 ft 3 in)
- Weight: 84 kg (185 lb)

Playing career
Years	Club	Games (Goals)
1978–1992	Glenelg	319 (214)

Career highlights
- 2× SANFL Premiership player: (1985, 1986); Glenelg leading goalkicker: (1987); Glenelg Hall of Fame, inducted 2003

John Seebohm (born 6 April 1960) is a former Australian rules footballer who played for the Glenelg Football Club in the South Australian National Football League.

== Playing career ==
Regarded as a quiet achiever, Seebohm is one of only three footballers to have played over 300 senior League matches for Glenelg (the other two being Peter Carey and David Marshall). He was a versatile mid-sized player who played much of his career at centre half-back but also excelled in attack, being named at full-forward in the 1986 premiership side and kicking 89 goals in 1987.

== Personal ==
Seebohm and his wife Karen, a netballer and swimming instructor, are the parents of four children, including their only daughter, Olympic swimmer Emily Seebohm.
