= Imperial Football Club =

Names
- Full name: Imperial Football Club
- Nickname(s): Blues

Club details
- Founded: 1931; 94 years ago
- Colours: lightblue navy
- Competition: River Murray FL
- Premierships: 22 (RMFL): 1931, 1946, 1948, 1952 1953, 1957, 1958, 1967, 1969, 1976, 1977, 1978, 1983, 1988, 1993, 1998, 1999, 2002, 2009, 2011, 2018, 2022
- Ground(s): Johnstone Park

Uniforms
Home	Away

Other information
- Official website: impfc.com.au

The Imperial Football Club, nicknamed the Blues, is an Australian rules football club in Murray Bridge, South Australia. It is one of nine clubs that compete in the River Murray Football League (RMFL). Its colours consist of navy and light blues with a white IFC logo.

== History ==
The Imperial Football Club was formed in 1931 after the Murray Bridge Rovers were split into two separate clubs. The Rambler Football Club shared the same oval for 35 years and were the arch rival of the Blues. In 1966 Imperials moved to Johnstone Park after decided the club needed its own ground and clubrooms.

Imperials have grown to become one of the most successful clubs in its league, winning 22 premierships since their foundation in 1931.

Ash Temby hold the RMFL record for most senior games 500 - 1994-2025

390 Imperials

107 Mypolonga

3 RMFL

=== Notable players ===
- Martin Mattner (Adelaide Crows, Sydney Swans)
- Chad Wingard (Port Adelaide, Hawthorn)
