= 1950 SANFL Grand Final =

Norwood	Glenelg
15.16 (106)	8.11 (59)
	1	2	3	4
NOR	7.5 (47)	8.6 (54)	12.9 (81)	15.16 (106)
GLE	2.2 (14)	5.5 (35)	6.7 (43)	8.11 (59)
- Date: Saturday, 30 September
- Stadium: Adelaide Oval
- Attendance: 50,389

The 1950 SANFL Grand Final was an Australian rules football competition. Norwood beat Glenelg 106 to 59.
