= River Murray Football League =

Australian rules football competition

- Sport: Australian rules football
- Founded: 1931; 95 years ago
- No. of teams: 9
- Country: Australia
- Most recent champion: Jervois (2026)
- Most titles: Imperial Football Club (22 premierships)
- Related competitions: SANFL

The River Murray Football League is an Australian rules football competition based in the Murray Bridge region of South Australia, Australia. It is an affiliated member of the South Australian National Football League.

== History ==
The competition was founded in 1931 with the foundation clubs Imperials, Ramblers and Mypolonga.

Traditionally the 2 Murray Bridge clubs, Imperials and Ramblers, have had a rivalry, and both have had their share of success over the years. Mannum and Mypolonga both broke premiership droughts in recent decades, however both clubs have struggled in the last 15 years to convert multiple grand final appearances into premierships. Meningie broke through for their first premiership in the RMFL in 2001, however their form since has fluctuated dependent on their ability to recruit players from the Adelaide region.

In 2007 the Jervois Football Club won their fourth consecutive League Premiership when they defeated the Imperial Football Club for the second consecutive year. 2004 to 2007 was a golden era for the Jervois Football Club, but they were unable to win 5 in a row in 2008, with the Rambler Football Club winning their first premiership since 1987 after defeating Mypolonga.

Ramblers won their 2nd premiership in 3 years in 2010 with victory over Mannum.

In the clash of the Murray Bridge clubs in 2011, Imperials defeated reigning premiers Ramblers in the Grand Final at Meningie Oval. Mail Medalist Tyson Wait led the Blues to victory with a dominant performance in defence.

Very little separated the top 5 clubs in season 2012. In the Grand Final at Johnston Park, the fast finishing Ramblers side defied the odds to claim a 5-point victory in a high-scoring game against Minor premiers Mypolonga.

The Mannum Football Club broke the recent stranglehold of the 2 Murray Bridge clubs, in 2013, with victory over Imperials in the Grand Final. With retired SANFL stars Jeremy Clayton and Jade Sheedy featuring prominently, the Roos stormed home in the last quarter to collect their first flag since 2003.

A merger was announced between Meningie and Border Downs-Tintinara of the Mallee Football League at the end of the 2022 season, with the two clubs forming the Coorong Cats. Two other merged entities, Mallee Districts and the Southern Mallee Suns would also join the league following the demise of the Mallee Football League.

== Clubs ==
=== Locations ===
Locations of the River Murray FL clubs

=== Current ===
Club	Jumper	Nickname	Home Ground	Former League	Est.	Years in RMFL	RMFL Senior Premierships	
Club	Jumper	Nickname	Home Ground	Former League	Est.	Years in RMFL	Total	Years
Coorong		Cats	Meningie Oval, Meningie; Coonalpyn Oval, Coonalpyn and Tintinara Oval, Tintinara	–	2022	2023–	2	2024, 2025
Imperial		Blues	Johnstone Park, Murray Bridge	–	1931	1931–	22	1931, 1946, 1948, 1952, 1953, 1957, 1958, 1967, 1969, 1976, 1977, 1978, 1983, 1988, 1993, 1998, 1999, 2002, 2009, 2011, 2018, 2022
Jervois		Bluds	Jervois Oval, Jervois	MDFA	1926	1932–1937, 1946–	21	1932, 1934, 1935, 1936, 1937, 1959, 1961, 1963, 1964, 1966, 1968, 1984, 1986, 2004, 2005, 2006, 2007, 2020, 2021, 2023, 2026
Mallee Districts		Storm	Peake Oval, Peake and Karoonda Oval, Karoonda	–	2022	2023–	0	-
Mannum		Roos	Mannum Oval, Port Mannum	MRFA, TVFA	1927	1933–36, 1939–57, 1964–	7	1944, 1949, 1955, 1956, 2003, 2013, 2015
Mypolonga		Tigers	Mypolonga Memorial Oval, Mypolonga	MRFA	1928	1931–	8	1938, 1939, 1989, 1990, 1991, 1994, 2017, 2019
Rambler		Roosters	LeMessurier Oval, Murray Bridge	–	1931	1931–	16	1933, 1941, 1950, 1951, 1971, 1975, 1979, 1980, 1981, 1982, 1985, 1987, 2008, 2010, 2012, 2016
Southern Mallee		Suns	Lameroo Sport Grounds, Lameroo and Pinnaroo Oval, Pinnaroo	–	2022	2023–	0	-
Tailem Bend		Eagles	Jaensch Park, Tailem Bend	–	1946	1946–	14	1947, 1954, 1960, 1962, 1965, 1970, 1972, 1973, 1974, 1992, 1995, 1996, 1997, 2000

=== Former ===
Club	Jumper	Nickname	Home Ground	Former League	Est.	Years in RMFL	RMFL Senior Premierships		Fate
Club	Jumper	Nickname	Home Ground	Former League	Est.	Years in RMFL	Total	Years	Fate
Border Downs		Magpies	Coonalpyn Oval, Coonalpyn and Yumali Oval, Yumali	–	1955	1955–1991	0	-	Merged with Tintinara in 1992 to form Border Downs-Tintinara
Border Downs-Tintinara		Crows	Coonalpyn Oval, Coonalpyn and Tintinara Oval, Tintinara	–	1992	1993–2001	0	-	Moved to Mallee FL in 2002
Bremer			Callington Oval, Callington	–	1931	1940–1957	1	1955 (B Grade)	Moved to Hills Central FA in 1958
Callington			Callington Oval, Callington		1904	1937–1940	3	1937, 1938, 1939, (B Grade)	Moved to Hills Central FA in 1946
Monteith			Monteith Oval, Monteith	MDFA	1914	1938–1951	4	1948, 1949, 1950, 1951 (B Grade)	Folded after 1951 season
Murray Bridge			Murray Bridge Showgrounds, Murray Bridge	–	1944	1944–1945	1	1945	Split back into Imperials and Rambler after WWII
Murray Bridge Redlegs		Redlegs	Murray Bridge Showgrounds, Murray Bridge	–	1983	1983–2005	0	-	Folded halfway through 2005 season
Nairne Bremer		Rams	Nairne Oval, Nairne	HFL	1978	1992–1997	0	-	Returned to Hills FL in 1998
Meningie	(1955-95)(1996-2022)	Bears	Meningie Oval, Meningie	LDFA	1898	1955–2022	2	2001, 2014	Merged with Border Downs-Tintinara in 2023 to form Coorong Cats
Palmer		Eagles	Collier Park, Palmer	MRFA	1891	1940–1957	0	-	Moved to Torrens Valley FA in 1958
Tailem Bend Warriors		Warriors		MDFA	1934	1941–1945	0	-	Folded in 1946

== Inter-league ==
From 1958 to 1969 and from 1972 to 1999, the River Murray FL participated in the Lovelock Shield against the Great Southern Football League, Southern Football League and Hills Football League.

== League premiers ==
- 2026 Jervois 10.12 (72) defeated Mannum 8.8 (56)
- 2025 Coorong Cats 7.14 (56) defeated Jervois 7.8 (50)
- 2024 Coorong Cats 19.9 (123) defeated Mypolonga 5.3 (33)
- 2023 Jervois 10.13 (73) defeated Mypolonga 8.16 (64)
- 2022 Imperials 14.18 (77) defeated Jervois 7.7 (49)
- 2021 Jervois 14.5 (89) defeated Imperials 5.8 (38)
- 2020 Jervois 11.14 (80) defeated Imperials 9.8 (62)
- 2019 Mypolonga 12.7 (79) defeated Ramblers 7.11 (53)
- 2018 Imperials 9.6 (60) defeated Mannum 8.10 (58)
- 2017 Mypolonga 13.7 (85) defeated Meningie 3.9 (27)
- 2016 Ramblers 20.7 (127) defeated Mannum 11.12 (78)
- 2015 Mannum 19.5 (119) defeated Imperials 11.5 (71)
- 2014 Meningie 15.17 (107) defeated Ramblers 7.7 (49)
- 2013 Mannum 13.15 (93) defeated Imperials 10.9 (69)
- 2012 Ramblers 21.15 (141) defeated Mypolonga 21.10 (136)
- 2011 Imperials 16.15 (111) defeated Ramblers 9.9 (63)
- 2010 Ramblers 13.10 (88) defeated Mannum 9.16 (70)
- 2009 Imperials 22.15 (147) defeated Mannum 12.8 (80)
- 2008 Ramblers 15.15 (105) defeated Mypolonga 10.9 (69)
- 2007 Jervois 11.8 (74) defeated Imperials 10.10 (70)
- 2006 Jervois 19.10 (124) defeated Imperials 16.10 (106)
- 2005 Jervois 26.17 (173) defeated Tailem Bend 5.8 (38)
- 2004 Jervois 10.12 (72) defeated Imperials 8.7 (55)
- 2003 Mannum 8.8 (56) defeated Imperials 5.9 (39)
- 2002 Imperials 15.6 (96) defeated Meningie 12.10 (82)
- 2001 Meningie 14.12 (96) defeated Imperials 9.3 (57)
- 2000 Tailem Bend 15.10 (100) defeated Imperials 9.3 (57)
- 1999 Imperials 18.10 (118) defeated Mannum 10.6 (66)
- 1998 Imperials 12.12 (84) defeated Mannum 4.15 (39)
- 1997 Tailem Bend 14.9 (93) defeated Imperials 11.16 (82)
- 1996 Tailem Bend 15.13 (103) defeated Mannum 4.11 (35)
- 1995 Tailem Bend 19.19 (133) defeated Murray Bridge Redlegs 14.10 (94)
- 1994 Mypolonga 18.9 (117) defeated Imperials 14.9 (93)
- 1993 Imperials 16.10 (106) defeated Mannum 11.10 (76)
- 1992 Tailem Bend 20.9 (129) defeated Mannum 12.3 (75)
- 1991 Mypolonga 17.15 (117) defeated Tailem Bend 8.9 (57)
- 1990 Mypolonga 9.11 (65) defeated Mannum 7.16 (58)
- 1989 Mypolonga 16.8 (104) defeated Meningie 12.10 (82)
- 1988 Imperials 8.9 (57) defeated Mypolonga 7.10 (52)
- 1987 Ramblers 10.18 (78) defeated Imperials 7.17 (57)
- 1986 Jervois 8.15 (63) defeated Imperials 7.12 (54)
- 1985 Ramblers 17.17 (119) defeated Jervois 16.5 (101)
- 1984 Jervois 14.11 (95) defeated Imperials 9.11 (65)
- 1983 Imperials 11.11 (77) defeated Ramblers 11.10 (76)
- 1982 Ramblers 11.11 (77) defeated Imperials 10.1 (61)
- 1981 Ramblers 12.20 (92) defeated Jervois 7.8 (50)
- 1980 Ramblers 15.25 (115) defeated Imperials 13.9 (87)
- 1979 Ramblers 16.14 (96) defeated Imperials 13.11 (89)
- 1978 Imperials 11.11 (77) defeated Ramblers 10.12 (72)
- 1977 Imperials 15.11 (101) defeated Ramblers 9.17 (71)
- 1976 Imperials 11.11 (77) defeated Ramblers 10.12 (72)
- 1975 Ramblers 12.14 (86) defeated Imperials 6.12 (48)
- 1974 Tailem Bend 14.20 (104) defeated Ramblers 15.8 (98)
- 1973 Tailem Bend 14.18 (102) defeated Jervois 8.6 (54)
- 1972 Tailem Bend 17.7 (109) defeated Mypolonga 12.10 (82)
- 1971 Ramblers 16.13 (109) defeated Tailem Bend 11.21 (87)
- 1970 Tailem Bend 13.8 (86) defeated Meningie 10.18 (78)
- 1969 Imperials 10.14 (74) defeated Ramblers 10.12 (72)
- 1968 Jervois 18.8 (116) defeated Imperials 15.14 (104)
- 1967 Imperials 14.10 (94) defeated Jervois 11.7 (73)
- 1966 Jervois 15.10 (100) defeated Tailem Bend 13.12 (90)
- 1965 Tailem Bend 17.15 (117) defeated Ramblers 13.5 (83)
- 1964 Jervois 8.11 (59) defeated Ramblers 9.3 (57)
- 1963 Jervois 11.15 (81) defeated Tailem Bend 5.13 (43)
- 1962 Tailem Bend 12.5 (77) defeated Jervois 8.6 (54)
- 1961 Jervois 9.20 (74) defeated Tailem Bend 9.6 (60)
- 1960 Tailem Bend 11.18 (84) defeated Ramblers 8.12 (60)
- 1959 Jervois 17.13 (115) defeated Imperials 10.6 (66)
- 1958 Imperials 8.11 (59) defeated Tailem Bend 8.10 (58)
- 1957 Imperials 9.20 (74) defeated Tailem Bend 10.7 (67)
- 1956 Mannum 10.13 (73) defeated Imperials 7.14 (56)
- 1955 Mannum 11.11 (77) defeated Tailem Bend 9.14 (68)
- 1954 Tailem Bend 11.5 (71) defeated Ramblers 6.7 (43)
- 1953 Imperials 14.10 (94) defeated Mannum 6.8 (44)
- 1952 Imperials 9.14 (68) defeated Mannum 6.7 (43)
- 1951 Ramblers 9.11 (65) defeated Imperials 8.5 (53)
- 1950 Ramblers 8.5 (53) defeated Mannum 5.15 (45)
- 1949 Mannum 11.10 (76) defeated Imperials 10.11 (71)
- 1948 Imperials 15.8 (98) defeated Tailem Bend 11.8 (74)
- 1947 Tailem Bend 11.17 (83) defeated Imperials 9.11 (65)
- 1946 Imperials 7.4 (46) defeated Jervois 4.6 (30)
- 1941–1945 No Competition
- 1940 Season abandoned after 8 matches
- 1939 Mypolonga 10.8 (68) defeated Ramblers 8.6 (54)
- 1938 Mypolonga 12.13 (85) defeated Ramblers 12.8 (80)
- 1937 Jervois 9.15 (69) defeated Imperials 8.6 (54)
- 1936 Jervois 11.14 (80)defeated Ramblers 7.7 (49)
- 1935 Jervois 4.13 (37) defeated Mypolonga 4.7 (31)
- 1934 Jervois 15.17 (107) defeated Ramblers 7.7 (49)
- 1933 Jervois 14.15 (99) defeated Ramblers 9.7 (61). Ramblers protested awarded the win
- 1932 Jervois 13.9 (87) defeated Imperials 5.12 (42)
- 1931 Imperials 4.14 (38) defeated Ramblers 4.6 (30)

== Standard Medalists / Mail Medalists ==
The Mail Medal was awarded to the best and fairest player of the year. Awarded from 1938 to 1940, and then 1949-2012. In 2013 the RMFL changed the name to the Murray Valley Standard Medal. It has since been renamed The Mail Medal again.

- 2026 Ray Bald (Ramblers)
- 2025 Ray Bald (Ramblers)
- 2024 Ray Bald (Ramblers)
- 2023 Ray Bald (Ramblers)
- 2022 Harley Montgomery (Imperials)
- 2021 Blake Tabe (Mannum)
- 2020 Will McMurray (Tailem Bend)/ Adam Smyth (Mannum)
- 2019 Matt Rankine (Ramblers)
- 2018 Clint Diment (Mypolonga) Taite Silverlock (Jervois)
- 2017 Brodie Martin (Meningie)
- 2016 Brian Fenton (Meningie)
- 2015 Jacob Bowen (Mannum)
- 2014 Brian Fenton (Meningie)
- 2013 Tyson Wait (Imperials)
- 2012 Phil Smith (Imperials)
- 2011 Tyson Wait (Imperials)
- 2010 Adam Eckermann (Mypolonga)
- 2009 Tyson Wait (Imperials)
- 2008 Liam O'Neil (Ramblers)
- 2007 Ryan Morris (Ramblers)
- 2006 Zac Ewer (Jervois)
- 2005 Mervyn Kartinyeri (Tailem Bend)
- 2004 Mervyn Kartinyeri (Tailem Bend) / Duane Dumesney (Tailem Bend)
- 2003 Daniel Zadow (Mannum)
- 2002 Ben Quinn (Mannum)
- 2001 Mark Marchetti (Mannum)
- 2000 Kym White (Meningie)
- 1999 Brett Lienert (Imperials)
- 1998 Michael Smart (Ramblers)
- 1997 Mervyn Kartinyeri (Tailem Bend)
- 1996 Craig Gilbert (Border Downs Tintinara)
- 1995 Brett Lienert (Imperials)
- 1994 Dwayne Krollig (Mannum)
- 1993 Greg Stephenson (Border Downs Tintinara)
- 1992 Roger Wilson (Tailem Bend)
- 1991 Mike Hunt (Tailem Bend) / David Buckley (Mannum)
- 1990 Lee Adams (Mannum)
- 1989 Noel Hartman (Tailem Bend) / David McKechnie (Meningie)
- 1988 Des Hicks (Imperials)
- 1987 Chris Smelt (Imperials) / David Ridgway (Ramblers)
- 1986 Greg Zadow (Imperials)
- 1985 Bradley Paech (Ramblers) / Dean Hansen (Border Downs)
- 1984 Greg Zadow (Imperials)
- 1983 Bradley Paech (Ramblers)
- 1982 Bradley Paech (Ramblers)
- 1981 Jimmy Rankine (Jervois)
- 1980 Bradley Paech (Ramblers)
- 1979 Garry Wright (Mypolonga)
- 1978 Terry Williamson (Imperials) / Kevin Dinon (Mypolonga)
- 1977 John Klienig (Mypolonga)
- 1976 Terry Connolly (Tailem Bend)
- 1975 Bohdan Cybulka (Ramblers)
- 1974 Ron Liebelt (Ramblers)
- 1973 Don Llewellyn (Jervois)
- 1972 Bohdan Cybulka (Tailem Bend)
- 1971 Bohdan Cybulka (Tailem Bend)
- 1970 Bohdan Cybulka (Tailem Bend)
- 1969 Bohdan Cybulka (Tailem Bend)
- 1968 Bohdan Cybulka (Tailem Bend)
- 1967 David Haythorpe (Mannum)
- 1966 Evan Jenkins (Border Downs)
- 1965 Bohdan Cybulka (Tailem Bend)
- 1964 Geoff Lokan (Jervois)
- 1963 Geoff Lokan (Jervois)
- 1962 Geoff Lokan (Jervois)
- 1961 Colin Gibbs (Jervois)
- 1960 Wayne Sanders (Meningie)
- 1959 Bill Lokan (Jervois)
- 1958 Bill Lokan (Jervois) / Wayne Sanders (Meningie)
- 1957 Laurie Reddaway (Border Downs)
- 1956 Laurie Reddaway (Border Downs)
- 1955 Eric Walter (Border Downs)
- 1954 Colin Wakefield (Mannum)
- 1953 Les Stone (Imperials)
- 1952 Eric Smelt (Imperials) / Harry Enthoven (Tailem Bend)
- 1951 Ron Hutchinson (Imperials) / Bill Martin (Mypolonga)
- 1950 Bill Lipp (Imperials) / Alf Skuse (Tailem Bend)
- 1949 Ron Hutchinson (Imperials)
- 1941-1948 Not Awarded
- 1940 Norm Weibricht (Imperials)
- 1939 Bill Melville (Mypolonga)
- 1938 Jack Foster (Mypolonga)

== Bohdan Cybulka Medal ==
Awarded to the best on ground during the League Grand Final.

- 2025 Matthew Hartman (Coorong Cats)
- 2024 Alex Stidiford (Coorong Cats)
- 2023 Peter Zarantonello (Jervois)
- 2022 Ben Gogel (Imperials)
- 2021 Taite Silverlock (Jervois)
- 2020 Luke Kluske (Jervois)
- 2019 James Moss (MYpolonga)
- 2018 John Boras (Imperials)
- 2017 Clint Diment (Mypolonga)
- 2016 Simon Newchurch (Ramblers)
- 2015 Paul Adlington (Mannum)
- 2014 Matthew Brunoli (Meningie)
- 2013 Jake Bowen (Mannum)
- 2012 Sam Margitich (Ramblers)
- 2011 Tyson Wait (Imperials)
- 2010 Joel Kay (Ramblers)
- 2009 Zeb Kenny (Imperials)
- 2008 Daniel Zadow (Ramblers)
- 2007 Trevor Rigney (Jervois)
- 2006 Tyron Hill (Jervois)
- 2005 Ben Pyman (Jervois)
- 2004 David Scholz (Jervois)
- 2003 Justin Maloney (Mannum)
- 2002 Simon Roesler (Imperials)
- 2001 Scott Baggs (Meningie)
- 2000 Craig Kowald (Tailem Bend)
- 1999 Damian Garrett (Imperials)
- 1998 Mark Hyam (Imperials)
- 1997 Jeremy Stagg (Tailem Bend)
- 1996 Mervyn Kartinyeri (Tailem Bend)
- 1995 Malcolm Polhner (Tailem Bend)
- 1994 John Bratkovic (Mypolonga)
- 1993 Kelvin Farnham (Imperials)
- 1992 Rick Laube (Tailem Bend)
- 1991 John Bratkovic (Mypolonga)
- 1990 Lee Adams (Mannum)

== Lyall Parker Club Championship ==
Awarded to the club with the most points over all grades.

- 2026 Jervois
- 2025 Jervois
- 2024 Imperials
- 2023 Imperials
- 2022 Imperials
- 2021 Tailem Bend
- 2020 Jervois
- 2019 Ramblers
- 2018 Imperials
- 2017 Ramblers
- 2016 Mannum
- 2015 Imperials
- 2014 Meningie
- 2013 Imperials
- 2012 Mypolonga
- 2011 Imperials
- 2010 Imperials
- 2009 Imperials
- 2008 Ramblers
- 2007 Imperials
- 2006 Imoerials
- 2005 Imperials
- 2004 Imperials
- 2003 Imperials
- 2002 Imperials
- 2001 Meningie
- 2000 Meningie
- 1999 Imperials
- 1998 Imperials
- 1997 Tailem Bend
- 1996 Tailem Bend
- 1995 Tailem Bend
- 1994 Imperials
- 1993 Imperials
- 1992 Imperials
- 1991 Imperials
- 1990 Mannum
- 1989 Ramblers
- 1988 Imperials
- 1987 Ramblers
- 1986 Border Downs
- 1985 Border Downs
- 1984 Imperials
- 1978 Imperials
- 1975 Ramblers

== Notable players ==
- Imperials Martin Mattner, Chad Wingard, Jarrod Lienert, Brandon Zerk-Thatcher
- Ramblers Brad Hartman
- Meningie Brodie Martin
- Border Downs Matthew Dent

== 2010 ladder ==
River Murray	Wins	Byes	Losses	Draws	For	Against	%	Pts	Final	Team	G	B	Pts	Team	G	B	Pts
Mannum	13	0	3	0	2129	903	70.22%	26	Elimination	0	0	0	0	0	0	0	0
Ramblers	13	0	3	0	2384	1022	69.99%	26	Qualifying	0	0	0	0	0	0	0	0
Imperials	12	0	4	0	2282	1189	65.74%	24	1st Semi	Imperials	14	15	99	Meningie	8	11	59
Meningie	9	0	7	0	1755	1290	57.64%	18	2nd Semi	Ramblers	13	12	90	Mannum	5	16	46
Mypolonga	6	0	10	0	1458	2396	37.83%	12	Preliminary	Mannum	15	11	101	Imperials	13	12	90
Jervois	3	0	13	0	868	2162	28.65%	6	Grand	Ramblers	13	10	88	Mannum	9	16	70
Tailem Bend	0	0	16	0	791	2705	22.63%	0									

== 2011 ladder ==
River Murray	Wins	Byes	Losses	Draws	For	Against	%	Pts	Final	Team	G	B	Pts	Team	G	B	Pts
Ramblers	14	0	2	0	2107	1386	60.32%	28	Elimination	0	0	0	0	0	0	0	0
Imperials	10	0	5	1	1839	1378	57.17%	21	Qualifying	0	0	0	0	0	0	0	0
Mannum	9	0	6	1	1614	1456	52.57%	19	1st Semi	Jervois	16	11	107	Mannum	15	12	102
Jervois	7	0	9	0	1567	1697	48.01%	14	2nd Semi	Imperials	15	16	106	Ramblers	14	8	92
Tailem Bend	6	0	10	0	1835	1978	48.12%	12	Preliminary	Ramblers	21	16	142	Jervois	10	9	69
Mypolonga	6	0	10	0	1524	1935	44.06%	12	Grand	Imperials	16	15	111	Ramblers	9	9	63
Meningie	3	0	13	0	1351	2007	40.23%	6									

== 2012 ladder ==
River Murray	Wins	Byes	Losses	Draws	For	Against	%	Pts	Final	Team	G	B	Pts	Team	G	B	Pts
Mypolonga	13	0	3	0	1998	1275	61.04%	26	Elimination	Meningie	16	18	114	Mannum	13	11	89
Imperials	12	0	4	0	1743	1174	59.75%	24	Qualifying	Imperials	11	10	76	Ramblers	10	8	68
Ramblers	11	0	4	1	1753	1426	55.14%	23	1st Semi	Ramblers	20	18	138	Meningie	17	7	109
Meningie	9	0	7	0	1730	1667	50.93%	18	2nd Semi	Mypolonga	22	12	144	Imperials	15	11	101
Mannum	7	0	9	0	1416	1379	50.66%	14	Preliminary	Ramblers	15	9	99	Imperials	8	8	56
Jervois	2	0	13	1	1332	2334	36.33%	5	Grand	Ramblers	21	15	141	Mypolonga	21	10	136
Tailem Bend	1	0	15	0	1209	1926	38.56%	2									

== 2013 ladder ==
River Murray	Wins	Byes	Losses	Draws	For	Against	%	Pts	Final	Team	G	B	Pts	Team	G	B	Pts
Imperials	13	0	3	0	1910	1154	62.34%	26	Elimination	Meningie	31	20	206	Jervois	11	9	75
Ramblers	11	0	5	0	1591	1101	59.10%	22	Qualifying	Mannum	17	9	111	Ramblers	10	11	71
Mannum	10	0	6	0	1510	1249	54.73%	20	1st Semi	Ramblers	14	13	97	Mypolonga	12	17	89
Mypolonga	9	0	7	0	1680	1401	54.53%	18	2nd Semi	Mannum	16	12	108	Imperials	10	12	72
Jervois	8	0	8	0	1314	1613	44.89%	16	Preliminary	Imperials	20	20	140	Ramblers	7	4	46
Meningie	3	0	13	0	1254	1705	42.38%	6	Grand	Mannum	13	15	93	Imperials	10	10	70
Tailem Bend	2	0	14	0	1056	2092	33.55%	4									

== 2014 ladder ==
River Murray	Wins	Byes	Losses	Draws	For	Against	%	Pts	Final	Team	G	B	Pts	Team	G	B	Pts
Ramblers	12	0	4	0	1778	1051	62.85%	24	Elimination	Meningie	12	14	86	Imperials	11	6	72
Meningie	10	0	5	1	1765	1242	58.70%	21	Qualifying	Meningie	12	12	84	Mypolonga	10	14	74
Mypolonga	10	0	5	1	1686	1301	56.44%	21	1st Semi	Mannum	18	11	119	Mypolonga	14	8	92
Mannum	10	0	6	0	1464	1218	54.59%	20	2nd Semi	Meningie	11	12	78	Ramblers	8	11	59
Imperials	7	0	9	0	1525	1358	52.90%	14	Preliminary	Ramblers	14	13	97	Mannum	12	12	84
Jervois	3	0	13	0	1230	1888	39.45%	6	Grand	Meningie	15	17	107	Ramblers	7	7	49
Tailem Bend	3	0	13	0	1052	2442	30.11%	6									

== 2025 Ladder ==
River Murray	Wins	Byes	Losses	Draws	For	Against	%	Pts	Final	Team	G	B	Pts	Team	G	B	Pts
Coorong Cats	15	2	1	0	1856	715	72.18%	30	Elimination	Southern	18	16	124	T Bend	6	6	42
Jervois	13	2	3	0	1509	903	62.56%	26	Qualifying	Jervois	7	14	56	Imperials	7	11	53
Imperials	12	2	4	0	1387	807	63.21%	24	1st Semi	Coorong	13	6	84	Jervois	10	9	69
Southern Mallee	10	2	6	0	1326	966	57.85%	20	2nd Semi	Imperials	10	9	69	Southern	5	6	36
Tailem Bend	6	2	10	0	966	1210	44.39%	12	Preliminary	Jervois	8	10	58	Imperials	8	9	57
Mannum	6	2	10	0	996	1355	42.36%	12	Grand	Coorong	7	13	55	Jervois	7	8	50
Ramblers	6	2	10	0	995	1495	39.95%	12									
Mypolonga	4	2	12	0	867	1110	43.85%	8									
Mallee District	0	2	16	0	628	1969	24.18%	0									

== Books ==
- Encyclopedia of South Australian country football clubs / compiled by Peter Lines. ISBN 9780980447293
- South Australian country football digest / by Peter Lines ISBN 9780987159199
