= Stephen Kerley =

Australian rules footballer (1953–2026)

Personal information
- Full name: Stephen Gordon Kerley
- Born: 25 January 1953
- Died: 29 September 2026 (aged 73); Warrnambool, Victoria, Australia
- Height: 184 cm (6 ft 0 in)
- Weight: 80.5 kg (177 lb)

Playing career^{1}
| Years | Club | Games (Goals) |
| 1971–74 | Melbourne | 43 (3) |
| 1975–80 | Norwood | 132 (19) |
| 1981–82 | North Adelaide | 29 (1) |
- ^{1} Playing statistics correct to the end of 1972.

Stephen Gordon Kerley (25 January 1953 – 29 September 2026) was an Australian rules footballer who played 43 games in 4 years with Melbourne in the Victorian Football League (VFL).

== Biography ==
In 1975 he transferred to Norwood in the SANFL where he greatly increased his game time (132 league games in 6 years) and had immediate success by winning premierships in 1975 and 1978.

In 1981 he transferred to North Adelaide where he added a further 27 league games plus 2 cup games during his final 2 seasons.

Kerley died in Warrnambool, Victoria on 29 September 2026, at the age of 73.
