= Neil Balme =

Australian rules footballer, born 1952

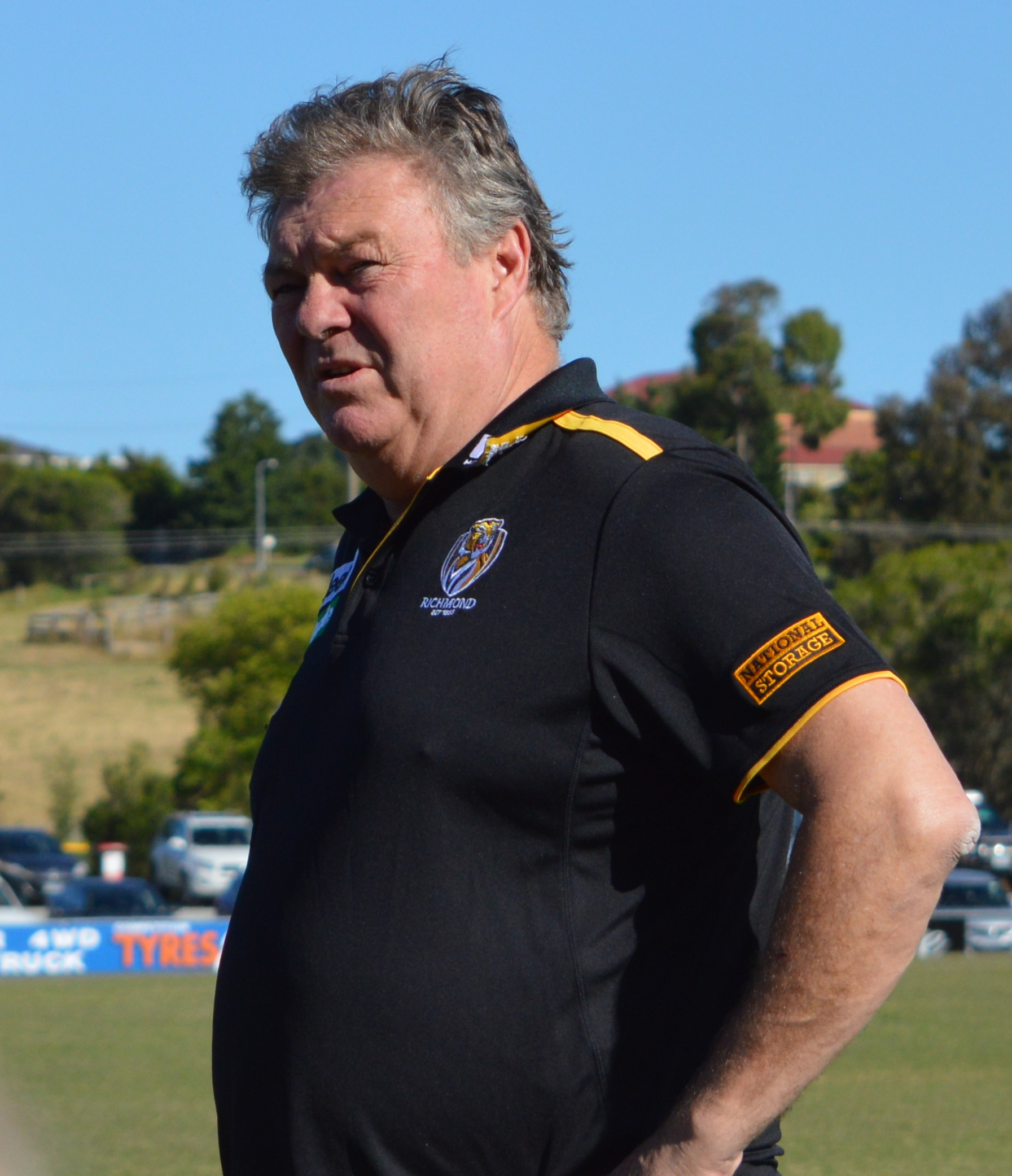
- Balme in December 2016

Personal information
- Nickname: Balmey
- Born: 15 January 1952 (age 74); Perth, Western Australia
- Height: 194 cm (6 ft 4 in)
- Weight: 104 kg (229 lb)

Playing career^{1}
Years	Club	Games (Goals)
1968	Subiaco	4 (0)
1970–1979	Richmond	159 (229)
1981–1982	Norwood	13 (22)
Total		176 (251)

Coaching career
Years	Club	Games (W–L–D)
1980–1990	Norwood	270 (162–106–2)
1991–1992	Woodville-West Torrens	49 (32–17–0)
1993–1997	Melbourne	98 (41–57–0)
- ^{1} Playing statistics correct to the end of 1997.

Career highlights
- 2× VFL Premiership player: 1973, 1974; 2× SANFL Premiership coach: 1982, 1984; All Australian Team coach: 1994; Life member Norwood and Richmond; 6× AFL Premiership football manager

Neil Allen Balme (born 15 January 1952) is a former Australian rules footballer who played for the Richmond Football Club in the Victorian Football League (VFL), as well as for the Subiaco Football Club in the Western Australian National Football League (WANFL) and the Norwood Football Club in the South Australian National Football League (SANFL).

Throughout his involvement in football, as a player, coach and administrator, Balme has experienced premiership success across a number of clubs. He is currently a board member at the Adelaide Football Club in the Australian Football League (AFL).

== Playing career ==
Balme was one of three brothers, the others being Ian and Craig, to play League football. As a player, Balme was one of football's wild men, a man mountain who often threw his weight around, resulting in many tribunal appearances. But he was also a skilled, thoughtful footballer who could take a strong, contested mark and boot the ball long distances. After retiring, he built a reputation as a football coach and later administrator that highlighted his innovative thinking about the game.

Balme played his junior football with Wembley Athletic Club, after leaving Mount Pleasant Amateurs, before transferring to Western Australian Football League (WAFL) club Subiaco in 1968. Aged just 16, Balme created a huge impression with a strong performance in the ruck against future Australian Football Hall of Famer Graham "Polly" Farmer in a game against West Perth Football Club. In January 1969, he moved to Melbourne with his family. He was quickly enticed to sign with Richmond along with his older brother Ian Balme.

It was a riches-to-rags situation after the move. The Tigers believed that the youngster needed some rounding to his still-raw game. Balme found himself playing at thirds (under-19) level with the Tigers. At season's end, he played in the team's third consecutive premiership under famous junior coach Ray Jordon. In 1970, Balme continued his development with the Tiger reserves, and he broke through for three senior games late in the year.

At this point, Richmond were in the process of generational change in the team after two premierships in the late 1960s. The club demanded strong, vigorous ruck players and identified the potential in Balme to continue the tradition. He was a team regular in 1971 as a forward/relief ruckman and performed well on the big stage during the Tigers' finals matches.

Balme stood out with his height, big physique, long, flowing hair and penchant for throwing his weight around. For 1972, the club recruited another player in a similar mould in Carlton's Ricky McLean, who played next to Balme at full-forward. The duo booted a combined total of 110 goals for the season and created terror among opposing defenders with their vigorous approach to the game. Balme was less effective in the finals, saving his best game for the Grand Final when he booted five goals in a losing performance against Carlton. He also provided several goals for teammates with intelligent tap-ons, hit outs and shepherds, an under-emphasised aspect of his game.

Twelve months later, Balme and his teammates fronted the same opposition in the 1973 VFL Grand Final, determined to avenge their shock loss. Richmond started well, and in the second quarter began to dominate the game. Balme instigated two incidents during this period that remain controversial to this day. Firstly, he threw a round arm punch into the jaw of his opponent, Carlton full back Geoff Southby. Although Southby was able to regain his feet after slumping to the ground, he had severe concussion and was replaced by a reserve at half time. Minutes later, Balme launched a flurry of punches at Carlton's Vin Waite during a scramble for the ball in the Richmond goalsquare. This sparked a small melee as the two teams converged on Balme and Waite. The umpire had a good sight of the incident and reported Balme, who was later suspended. It mattered little to the Tigers, who went on to win the game by five goals and annexe their third flag in seven years. But the club didn't escape criticism that they planned the two incidents before the game. Richmond players and officials have always defended Balme's actions, claiming that there was no way Balme premeditated his attacks on the Carlton players.

After serving his suspension early the following season, Balme returned to the side and was one of the driving forces behind the Tigers' performance in finishing on top of the ladder. He played well in the finals and aged 22 was a premiership player for the second time. Balme confirmed his status as a big-game performer in the 1975 finals, when Richmond finished third. By now, Balme was at the peak of his game and had a real presence on the field. However, at 193 cm, he was often conceding height to other ruckman; however, he was surprisingly mobile and agile, and he was never beaten in a one-on-one physical confrontation.

Richmond then lost a number of ruckman, allowing Balme to play more football on the ball and he was appointed vice captain of the club for the 1976 VFL season. Balme had his best-ever season in 1977, finishing second in Richmond's Best and Fairest award, the Jack Dyer Medal, and was chosen to play for his native Western Australia in the first state of origin match in October. Unfortunately, his finals campaign was hindered by a late season suspension, causing him to miss the first week of the finals. The following week he returned, only to be stymied by his North Melbourne opposition, who made a last-minute switch to his opponent that left Balme and his teammates off-guard. Richmond lost the match convincingly and were eliminated.

After a solid season in 1978, Balme's career suddenly curtailed the following year. He had missed just seven games in the preceding four seasons, but suffered his first major injury when he hurt his knee. Restricted to just two games for the year and usurped as first ruckman at Richmond by Mark Lee, Balme shocked the club when he accepted life membership and then retired from the game, aged only 27. Balme then shifted to South Australia, where he was snapped up by South Australian National Football League (SANFL) club Norwood as coach.

== Coaching career ==
Balme's stint at Norwood lasted eleven seasons during which his team never missed the finals. They won premierships in 1982 and 1984, earning Balme an excellent reputation and several overtures to return to Victoria and coach. Richmond were among the suitors for his talents. But Balme felt that the game was stagnating in its home state, dragged down by an emphasis on negativity and physicality. He encouraged a fast, open and skilful passing game that he believed was the future of the code.

In 1991, Balme left Norwood and became the inaugural coach of the new Woodville-West Torrens Football Club, formed from the merger of Woodville and West Torrens at the end of 1990. His success there proved that a merged entity could work at a time when AFL clubs were facing the prospect of merger to stay viable in the new, fully professional era. Eventually, he succumbed to the lure of coaching in the AFL and was appointed to lead Melbourne Football Club for the 1993 AFL season.

Balme's persistence with a strategic, high-possession, low-impact game plan earned both praise and ridicule. When the style succeeded it was attractive and hard to counter. However, when broken down by intense tackling, the players (and the coach) could look foolish and inept. Melbourne made it all way to the preliminary final in 1994, but struggled thereafter. Melbourne's poor record from 1995 on was due in part to injury to stars including Garry Lyon, David Schwarz, and Stephen Tingay. Balme's reasoned, personable style and his insistence on player self-empowerment made him very media-friendly, but some questioned whether he was suited to coaching in the AFL.

Balme and his players were caught in the turmoil surrounding the club's proposal to merge with Hawthorn Football Club in 1996. The team slumped and, after a number of embarrassing performances in 1997, Balme was sacked after Round 9 and eight successive losses by the controversial new Demons president, Joe Gutnick. He was replaced by Greg Hutchison for the rest of the season.

== Statistics ==
=== Playing statistics ===
Legend
G	Goals	K	Kicks	D	Disposals	T	Tackles
B	Behinds	H	Handballs	M	Marks	H/O	Hit-outs
#	Played in that season's premiership team

Season	Team	No.	Games	Totals								Averages (per game)								Votes
Season	Team	No.	Games	G	B	K	H	D	M	T	H/O	G	B	K	H	D	M	T	H/O	Votes
1970	Richmond	21	3	8	3	19	11	30	7	—N/a	11	2.7	1.0	6.3	3.7	10.0	2.3	—N/a	3.7	0
1971	Richmond	21	17	28	19	150	34	184	71	—N/a	34	1.6	1.1	8.8	2.0	10.8	4.2	—N/a	2.0	0
1972	Richmond	21	20	55	30	150	35	185	73	—N/a	59	2.8	1.5	7.5	1.8	9.3	3.7	—N/a	3.7	2
1973^{#}	Richmond	21	13	34	28	88	35	123	47	—N/a	25	2.6	2.2	6.8	2.7	9.5	3.6	—N/a	1.9	1
1974^{#}	Richmond	21	18	37	21	170	90	260	80	—N/a	7	2.1	1.2	9.4	5.0	14.4	4.4	—N/a	7.0	0
1975	Richmond	21	25	24	21	225	113	338	114	—N/a	133	1.0	0.8	9.4	4.7	14.1	4.8	—N/a	11.1	0
1976	Richmond	21	21	18	13	193	95	288	97	—N/a	156	0.9	0.6	9.2	4.5	13.7	4.6	—N/a	7.4	0
1977	Richmond	21	22	12	9	233	204	437	118	—N/a	352	0.5	0.4	10.6	9.3	19.9	5.4	—N/a	16.0	10
1978	Richmond	21	18	13	6	119	115	234	51	—N/a	175	0.7	0.3	6.6	6.4	13.0	2.8	—N/a	10.3	3
1979	Richmond	21	2	0	1	4	4	8	2	—N/a	1	0.0	0.5	2.0	2.0	4.0	1.0	—N/a	0.5	0
Career			159	229	151	1351	736	2087	660	—N/a	953	1.4	0.9	8.6	4.7	13.2	4.2	—N/a	7.5	16

=== Coaching statistics ===
Legend
W	Wins	L	Losses	D	Draws	W%	Winning percentage	LP	Ladder position	LT	League teams

Season	Team	Games	W	L	D	W %	LP	LT
1993	Melbourne	20	10	10	0	50.0%	10	15
1994	Melbourne	25	14	11	0	56.0%	7	15
1995	Melbourne	22	9	13	0	40.9%	9	16
1996	Melbourne	22	7	15	0	31.8%	14	16
1997*	Melbourne	9	1	8	0	11.1%	16	16
Career totals		98	41	57	0	41.8%		

* Replaced by caretaker coach Greg Hutchison.

== Football administrator ==
Balme found a position more suited to his personality when he was appointed football operations manager at the struggling Collingwood in 1998. In 2000, he was joined by former Richmond teammate Mick Malthouse (as coach) as part of an ambitious plan to lift the ailing Magpies up the ladder. Balme's calm, rational demeanour and casual style proved to be a great foil to Malthouse's more intense and temperamental character and the team made it to the 2002 and 2003 AFL Grand Finals, only to lose both matches to the Brisbane Lions.

Surprisingly, Balme was moved sideways by Collingwood at the end of the 2006 AFL season and he opted to accept an offer from Geelong Football Club to act as football operations manager in 2007, for the Cats, the year in which the club won its first Premiership in 44 years. The success at Geelong continued throughout his tenure, with two more Premierships (2009, 2011) and a Grand Final appearance (2008). After eight years at Geelong, Balme was offered and accepted the newly created director of coaching role with Collingwood at the end of 2014.

In September 2016 Balme left Collingwood to accept the position of General Manager of Football at Richmond. In his first year, Richmond went on to win 2017 premiership, breaking a 37-year drought. This drought breaking performance by the Richmond Football Club was backed up by a minor premiership in 2018, and then going on to win another two AFL premierships in the 2019 and 2020 seasons. In 2024 Balme completed his tenure at the Richmond Football Club.

In 2025, Balme was appointed to the board at the Adelaide Football Club. In his first season at the club, Adelaide finished first on the ladder and qualified for the finals series for the first time since 2017.

== Personal life ==
Balme was diagnosed with epilepsy later in life. In 2023, he became an ambassador for the Epilepsy Foundation of Australia, and has since taken part in various awareness and fundraising initiatives such as the Purple Muck Challenge as part of Make March Purple and the Treadmill Challenge as part of Walk for Epilepsy.
