= Tony Symonds =

Australian rules footballer and coach

Personal information
- Full name: Anthony George Symonds
- Born: 15 February 1962 (age 64)
- Original team: Sacred Heart College
- Draft: No. 65, 1986 national draft
- Height: 185 cm (6 ft 1 in)
- Weight: 72 kg (159 lb)
- Position: Wingman

Playing career^{1}
Years	Club	Games (Goals)
1981–86, 1988–92	Glenelg	225 (230)
1987	Hawthorn	3 (1)
Total		228 (231)

Coaching career
Years	Club	Games (W–L–D)
1995–96	Glenelg	42 (15–27–0)
- ^{1} Playing statistics correct to the end of 1987.

Career highlights
- SANFL Premiership player: (1985, 1986)

Anthony George Symonds (born 15 February 1962) is a former Australian rules footballer who played for the Hawthorn Football Club in the Victorian Football League (VFL) and the Glenelg Football Club in the South Australian National Football League (SANFL).

Symonds was a regular fixture of the Glenelg team of the 1980s, playing mostly as a wingman. He was a member of both Glenelg's 1985 and 1986 premiership teams. Using the last pick of the 1986 VFL draft, Hawthorn acquired his services for the 1987 VFL season where he played three games before returning to South Australia. He made his league debut in the opening round, with four disposals against Carlton. His next appearance came two weeks later, in a win over Collingwood, where he had 9 disposals and kicked two behinds. At the Sydney Cricket Ground in round seven, he played his third and final game, kicking a goal and managing 10 disposals.

After leaving Hawthorn, Symonds continued his career at Glenelg and in 1995 was appointed senior coach, as a replacement for Mark Williams, who had joined Essendon as an assistant. His coaching career started well with a 92-point win over Port Adelaide in the season opener but Glenelg could only finish the year in seventh. Again in 1996, the club finished in seventh position and he lost his job to former team-mate Wayne Stringer.
