= Michael Aish (footballer) =

Australian rules footballer

Personal information
- Born: 21 February 1961 (age 65); North Adelaide, South Australia

Playing career^{1}
Years	Club	Games (Goals)
1979–1993	Norwood	307 (449)
- ^{1} Playing statistics correct to the end of 1993.

Career highlights
- 2× SANFL Premiership player: (1982, 1984); Magarey Medal: (1981); 4× Norwood Club champion: (1981, 1983, 1984, 1992); Fos Williams Medal: (1983); 2× All-Australian team: (1983, 1986); Norwood Team of the Century; 15 state games for South Australia (captain 1986, 1989); South Australian Football Hall of Fame, Inductee 2002; Australian Football Hall of Fame Inductee 2023; Australian Sports Medal: (2000)

Michael C. Aish (born 21 February 1961) is a former Australian rules footballer who played for the Norwood Football Club in the South Australian National Football League (SANFL).

== Career ==
Aish and long time Norwood teammate Garry McIntosh continually resisted many big-money offers to move to Melbourne to play in the Victorian Football League (VFL) and remained loyal to Norwood and South Australian football. This was helped also by the SANFL's controversial player retention scheme where the league paid to keep as many South Australian players in the local league as possible rather than see them cross the border to play for VFL clubs.

Aish was the second son of former Norwood captain and coach Peter Aish. He had two siblings; his older brother Andrew also played league football for Norwood, and his younger sister Susan represented South Australia in both netball and softball. He won the SANFL's highest individual honor, the Magarey Medal in 1981 at the age of just 20 and was a premiership player with Norwood in 1982 when they defeated Glenelg in the Grand Final and again in 1984 when the Redlegs defeated Port Adelaide to become the first team in SANFL history to win the premiership after finishing the minor round in 5th place. His son Jesse has also played senior football for Norwood.

From 1987 to 1989, he was club captain and won Norwood's best and fairest in 1981, 1983, 1984 and 1992, emulating his father Peter who won the club's best and fairest award in 1960. Aish represented South Australia 15 times at interstate football, captaining the side in 1986 and 1989 as well as earning All-Australian selection in 1983 and 1986.

== Awards and achievements ==
Michael Aish retired after Norwood's Grand Final loss to Woodville-West Torrens in 1993. When the Norwood 'Team of the Century' was chosen, Aish was named as ruck-rover.

Aish was one of 113 inaugural inductees into the South Australian Football Hall of Fame in 2002.

On 24 October 2000, Aish was awarded the Australian Sports Medal for being a "recipient of the highest individual honour in South Australian Football".

On 27 June 2023, Aish was inducted in to the Australian Football Hall of Fame.

== Bibliography ==
- Coward, Mike (1992). Men of Norwood: The Red and Blue Blooded. Camden Park: Lane Print Group. ISBN 0-646-10456-X.
