= Craig Balme =

Australian rules footballer

Personal information
- Born: 5 March 1961 (age 65)
- Original team: Subiaco
- Height: 191 cm (6 ft 3 in)
- Weight: 88 kg (194 lb)

Playing career^{1}
Years	Club	Games (Goals)
1983	Richmond	3 (0)
1984–1995	Norwood	254 (87)
Total		257 (87)
- ^{1} Playing statistics correct to the end of 1995.

Career highlights
- Norwood premiership 1984

Craig Balme (born 5 March 1961) is a former Australian rules footballer who played with Richmond in the Victorian Football League (VFL) and Norwood in the South Australian National Football League (SANFL).

Balme, who started out at Richmond in the under 19s, made three senior appearances for Richmond, from rounds three to five in the 1983 VFL season. He then joined Norwood, coached by his brother Neil. From 1984 to 1995, Balme played 254 SANFL games for Norwood. He was a full-back in the club's 1984 premiership team and memorably clashed with opposition full-forward Tim Evans in the grand final win over Port Adelaide, before the first bounce.
