= Michael Gregg (footballer) =

Personal information
- Full name: Michael Gregg
- Nickname(s): Galloping Hat-Rack
- Position(s): Ruckman / Centre Half-Forward

Playing career
Years	Club	Games (Goals)
1971–1978	Norwood	161 (86)

Representative team honours
Years	Team	Games (Goals)
	South Australia	1 (0)

Career highlights
- SANFL Premiership player: 1975; * McCallum Medal: 1970  * Ardath Cup winner: 1977

Michael Gregg is a former Australian rules footballer who played for the Norwood Football Club in the South Australian National Football League (SANFL) during the 1970s.

== Early life and career ==
Gregg started playing football at Norwood High School. In 1970, he received the McCallum Medal, an award given to the best and fairest player in the SANFL Colts competition, which is for players under 17.

== SANFL career ==
He made his senior debut for Norwood in 1971 and played primarily as a ruckman and centre half-forward. Over eight seasons, Gregg played 161 league matches and kicked 86 goals.

Gregg was known for his distinctive running style and earned the nickname "Galloping Hat-Rack" from media commentator Mick Clingly.

== Achievements ==
Gregg was part of Norwood's 1975 premiership team, contributing as a ruckman alongside Neil Button. He also represented South Australia in one interstate match and was part of the team that won the Ardath Cup in 1977.

== Legacy ==
After retiring, Gregg remained connected to the sport and is remembered for his consistent performances and role in Norwood's success during the 1970s.
