= Rick Davies (footballer) =

Australian rules footballer (born 1952)

Personal information
- Full name: Evan Rick Davies
- Nickname: Jumbo Prince
- Born: 8 April 1952 (age 74)
- Original team: Prince Alfred College
- Height: 188 cm (6 ft 2 in)
- Weight: 90 kg (14 st 2 lb)

Playing career^{1}
Years	Club	Games (Goals)
1970–80, 1982–85	Sturt (SANFL)	317 (635)
1981	Hawthorn (VFL)	20 (37)
1985–86	South Adelaide (SANFL)	33 (146)

Coaching career
Years	Club	Games (W–L–D)
1985–87	South Adelaide (SANFL)	60 (20–39–1)
1989	Sturt (SANFL)	22 (4–18–0)
Total		82 (24–57–1)
- ^{1} Playing statistics correct to the end of 1986.

Career highlights
- Runner up, 1974 Magarey Medal; Sturt best & fairest 1973-76, 1978-80; Sturt premiership player 1974, 1976; Sturt leading goalkicker 1982-84; Sturt Team of the Century; Sturt Life Member 1977; All-Australian 1979, 1980 (captain); Ken Farmer Medal 1983 (151 goals - league record); South Adelaide leading goalkicker 1985–86; 20 state games for South Australia 1973-83; South Australian captain 1979, 1980; SANFL Player Life Member; Fifth all time SANFL leading goalkicker (781); South Australian Football Hall of Fame inaugural inductee 2002; Australian Football Hall of Fame inductee 2013

Rick Davies (born Evan Rick Davies, 8 April 1952) is a former Australian rules footballer who played with Sturt and South Adelaide in the South Australian National Football League (SANFL) and Hawthorn in the Victorian Football League (VFL). Nicknamed the "Jumbo Prince", Davies played a total of 390 games throughout his career (317 for Sturt, 33 for South Adelaide, 20 for Hawthorn, and 20 State Games for South Australia. Though not tall for a ruckman at only 188 cm (6 ft 2 in), Davies was known for his strong marking and body strength which he used to great effect against opponents who were often taller and heavier than him.

== Playing career ==
Rick Davies' senior career began with Sturt in 1970 at age 18. He went on to be named as Sturt's best and fairest player in a record seven of the eight seasons he played for the Double Blues. One of Davies' most noteworthy performances was his dominant display in the 1976 Grand Final victory against Port Adelaide. Davies was judged best on ground on the day when the all-time SANFL record attendance was set when 66,897 fans crammed into Football Park.

In 1981 Davies joined Hawthorn in the VFL. Changes to rules for rucking contests disadvantaged shorter ruckman, and Davies mostly played in the forward pocket, kicking 37 goals. He returned to Sturt in 1982 and was their leading goal kicker for the next three seasons.

In 1983 Davies kicked an SANFL record 151 goals for the season, (Note: later beaten in 1990 by Scott Hodges of Port Adelaide who kicked 153) which included 11 goals in a 114-point win over Port Adelaide at Unley Oval, and a club record 15 against West Adelaide in round eight at Football Park. (Note: this would be only one goal shy of Football Park's all-time record of 16 goals in a match by Woodville’s John Roberts in 1977) Davies would play his last Grand Final for Sturt later in the 1983 season when the Double Blues went down to West Adelaide. After averaging over 6 goals per game in 1983, Davies was restricted by Tony Burgess to only two in the Grand Final, with his first in the third quarter making him the first player to ever kick 150 goals in a SANFL season, beating Tim Evans’ record of 146 from 1980.

Davies’ form at full forward in 1983 was such that he kept Sturt's young goal kicking hotshot Ian Wilmott playing in the reserves for most of the season. Wilmott, who kicked 97 goals for the season in the SANFL Reserves, (Note: plus another two in a disappointing finals series) played only one game of league football while Davies was on state duty with the South Australian team in Perth in 1983 in Round 10 against Norwood at Norwood Oval, kicking six goals in his league debut. The next week Davies returned to the side while Wilmott was back in the reserves team.

After again leading Sturt's goal kicking in 1984, Davies lost form early in 1985, and coack Mervyn Keane dropped him at the beginning of May. Despite a protest from Sturt president Cliff Hawkins, Rick would announce his retirement the following week. However, when former Hawthorn teammate Don Scott was sacked by South Adelaide four days later, Davies was immediately suspected as a possible replacement. (Note: South had had an interest in Davies as a replacement for Graham Cornes during the preceding off-season) He would be appointed only three days after Scott's resignation. Although Sturt wanted a sum of $10,000 for him to play, Davies would be cleared to play from the final week of May, and would lead the Panthers' goalkicking for 1985 and 1986 with 72 goals in each season, although the team finished only eighth in 1985 and ninth in 1986.

Davies retired as a player at the end of the 1986 season, with a SANFL total of 350 league appearances and 781 goals over 16 seasons.

== Representative career ==
Rick Davies was a regular interstate representative, with 20 appearances for South Australia from 1973 until 1983, captaining the State in 1979 and 1980. In 1980 Davies was named as captain of the All Australian team.

== Coaching career ==
Rick Davies stayed on as non-playing coach of South Adelaide in 1987. The Panthers finished last and Davies was replaced as coach. In September 1988 he was named senior coach of Sturt after Mervyn Keane's controversial departure. Sturt had finished fifth under Keane in 1988 but finished last in 1989 under Davies, who resigned following Sturt's 132-point loss to Glenelg in their final match. The Double Blues continued to struggle after Davies resigned, not recovering until after eight consecutive wooden spoons and a winless 1995 season.

== Awards and achievements ==
Rick Davies was awarded Life Membership as a player of the Sturt Football Club in 1977. His 781 SANFL goals ranks 5th on the all-time list and his 151 goals in 1983 broke the record of 146 set in 1980 by Port Adelaide's Tim Evans, before being bettered by Port's Scott Hodges who kicked 153 in 1990. He was one of 113 inaugural inductees into the South Australian Football Hall of Fame in 2002 and his 350 SANFL games for Sturt and South Adelaide qualified him for SANFL Player Life Membership. Davies was named in Sturt's "Team of the Century" as 1st Ruck and forward.

In 2013 Davies was inducted into the Australian Football Hall of Fame at a gala dinner in Canberra.

In 2014, a bar in the new southern stand at the re-developed Adelaide Oval was named in his honour.
