= Garry McIntosh =

Australian rules footballer and coach

Personal information
- Full name: Garry McIntosh
- Nickname: Macca
- Born: 16 March 1964 (age 62); Adelaide, South Australia
- Original team: Hope Valley
- Draft: No. 21, 1982 interstate draft
- Height: 172 cm (5 ft 8 in)
- Weight: 83 kg (183 lb)
- Positions: Half-forward flank, rover

Playing career^{1}
Years	Club	Games (Goals)
1982–1998	Norwood	336 (165)

International team honours
Years	Team	Games (Goals)
1984–1986	Australia	5

Coaching career
Years	Club	Games (W–L–D)
2002–2004	Norwood	63 (31–31–1)
- ^{1} Playing statistics correct to the end of 1998.

Career highlights
- 2× SANFL Premiership player: (1982, 1984); 2× Norwood best and fairest: (1987, 1991); Norwood captain: (1990–1998); 2× Magarey Medal: (1994, 1995); 3× Fos Williams Medal: (1984, 1992, 1995); Norwood Hall of Fame, Legend status; South Australian Football Hall of Fame, inducted 2012; Norwood Team of the Century (forward flank)

Garry McIntosh (born 16 March 1964) is a former Australian rules footballer who played for the Norwood Football Club in the South Australian Football League (SANFL).

A dual Magarey Medallist, McIntosh is considered one of the greatest ever to play the game.

== Playing career ==
McIntosh primarily played as a centreman or rover and remained loyal to Norwood throughout his career, playing a record 336 games for the club before his retirement in 1998. He was a premiership player with them twice, the first came in his debut season in 1982 and the second in 1984. A third premiership was within his grasp in 1997, but McIntosh missed the Grand Final through suspension. From 1990 to 1998 he was club captain and in 2002 he returned to Norwood to serve as their senior coach for three seasons. He was drafted by North Melbourne in the 1982 VFL Draft, but chose to stay in South Australia.

Garry also represented South Australia 12 times during his career, winning three Fos Williams Medals (in 1984 v Western Australia, in 1992 v Western Australia, and in 1995 v Tasmania), while he also played 35 pre-season/night series matches and five International Rules matches in 1984 and 1986. If these are included, McIntosh played 388 career senior games.

Former North Adelaide and Norwood player Andrew Jarman cited McIntosh as his toughest SANFL opponent. Jarman won the 1987 Magarey Medal: that year, McIntosh polled the most votes, but was ineligible due to suspension. McIntosh also cleaned up Dermot McNicholl in the 1986 International Rules match in Perth, resulting in him missing the next test due to suspension.

== Coaching career ==
After retiring from playing football, McIntosh went to Tasmania in 2000 to take up the senior coaching position at Tasmanian Statewide League club North Launceston, winning the minor premiership in his debut season, but fell to Clarence in the Grand Final. The following season, North Launceston joined the North West Football League (NWFL) after the TSL folded, and again made it to the Grand Final, only to again fall at the last hurdle, this time to the Burnie Dockers. McIntosh also played 19 games whilst coaching the club (three in the TSL, and another 16 in the NTFL): if these are included, McIntosh played a career total of 355 premiership matches and 407 career senior games.

McIntosh returned to Norwood in 2002 as senior coach, but in three seasons was unable to replicate the success of his playing days.

In 2005, he became coach of Payneham Norwood Union Football Club, which at the time was in Division 4 of the South Australian Amateur Football League (SAAFL). In his first two seasons, the club won the Division 4 and Division 3 premierships to move into Division 2, and then won back-to-back flags again in 2013 and 2014 to move into Division 1. The club made the grand final in Division One in 2015, but was beaten by the Goodwood Saints. He also coached the under 15 'A' Team for Payneham Norwood Union in the SANFL Juniors, guiding it to a premiership in 2017 by defeating Kenilworth at Thebarton Oval on 17 September, but the senior PNU team lost their grand final against Rostrevor Old Collegians the following week. McIntosh finally broke through in what would be his final season as senior coach of PNU in 2019, guiding the team to the Division 1 Premiership.

He also played amateur cricket for Hope Valley Cricket Club from 1980 to 1983, and holds the club record for the most runs in a season with 856.

In 2021, McIntosh was nominated for induction into the Australian Football Hall of Fame but declined because, according to the Hall of Fame selection chair Richard Goyder, "he did not play the game for personal honours".
