= 1986 SANFL Grand Final =

1986 Australian rules football final

North Adelaide	Glenelg
12.15 (87)	21.9 (135)
	1	2	3	4
NA	3.2 (20)	6.7 (43)	9.11 (65)	12.15 (87)
GLE	7.2 (44)	12.4 (76)	17.5 (107)	21.9 (135)
- Date: Saturday, 4 October (2:10 pm)
- Stadium: Football Park
- Attendance: 50,538

Accolades
- Jack Oatey Medallist: Tony Hall (Glenelg)

The 1986 SANFL Grand Final was an Australian rules football competition. Glenelg beat North Adelaide 135 to 87.
