= Rambler Football Club =

Australian rules football club

Rambler
- Full name: Rambler Football Club
- Nickname: The Roosters
- Sport: Australian rules football
- Founded: 1931
- League: River Murray Football League
- Home ground: Le Messurier Oval, Murray Bridge

The Rambler Football Club, nicknamed the Roosters, is an Australian rules football club that plays in the River Murray Football League and is one of two teams based in Murray Bridge, South Australia, the other being the Imperial Football Club.

== History ==
=== Murray Bridge FC (1885-1919) ===
The history of football in Murray Bridge dates back to the 1880s, fifty years before the formation of both the Imperial and Rambler football clubs. The Murray Bridge Football Club was founded on 8 May 1885 and until 1919, football games in Murray Bridge and surrounding townships were played on a rather ad hoc basis as there was no regular premiership competition. But from 1885 to 1918, Murray Bridge had multiple local teams such as Centrals, Railways, Souths, St. Andrews and Town. The Murray River Football Association was founded on 11 May 1919 with only three teams in the competition which consisted of subsequent premiers Murray Bridge, Mannum and Pompoota.

=== Murray Bridge Rovers (1920-1930) ===
Another Murray Bridge club was founded in 1920, known as the Murray Bridge Rovers, increasing the number of teams to four. Murray Bridge won the 1920 premiership and Rovers won the following year. Another change came in 1922 when the footballers of Murray Bridge were split into three new teams: Rovers, Bridgeport and United. The 1924 season saw the inclusion of the Tailem Bend Football Club that increased the number of teams to five. The Bridgeport and United clubs merged to reform the Murray Bridge Football Club in March 1926 and played in the Hills Football Association along with Milang, Mount Barker, Onkaparinga and Strathalbyn, with Murray Bridge winning the same year and all six clubs continuing to participate in the following 1927 season. In 1928, Murray Bridge and Onkaparinga withdrew from the competition, thus cutting the number of teams to four and the Rovers club lost the grand final that year to Mount Barker. Rovers won the grand final and were minor premiers the following season in 1929 and still competed against Milang, Mount Barker and Strathalbyn. 1930 saw a press report say that it had killed interest in senior football in Murray Bridge.

==== Foundation of the Imperial and Rambler football clubs (1931) ====
A four-team River Murray Football Association was founded in 1930 with competing teams from Mannum, Mypolonga and Port Mannum and the former Bridgeport club was revived and competed in the competition. There were moves made to form a competition in early 1931 but failed due to a few possible teams already committing to other leagues but in May that same year, a decision was made during a meeting in the Murray Bridge Institute to reform a local association. Two of the most prominent players from the Murray Bridge Rovers divided the players of the recently reformed Murray Bridge FC into two equal groups, which became the Imperial and Rambler football clubs. Both Imperials and Ramblers, along with Mypolonga, formed the River Murray association which is currently known as the River Murray Football League what both clubs are currently affiliated with. Mannum and Ponde had teams that were unable to accept a late invitation into the association. A trial match was held on Saturday 6 June 1932, which resulted in a draw. Imperials won the inaugural RMFA minor round match on 8 June by beating Ramblers 11.10.76 to 10.13.73 i 1931. The Imperial club went on to become the inaugural RMFA premiers by beating Ramblers 4.14.38 to 4.6.30 in the Grand Final.

==== Rambler Football Club (1932-present) ====
Early games between Ramblers and Imperials were rather small margins but the club's first win was quite a large margin with 16.16.112 to 5.11.41 against Imperials being the scoreline. The following week they defeated Mypolonga 14.8.92 to 11.9.75. That season saw Ramblers sit third on the ladder behind the 1st-placed Imperials and Mypolonga having the higher percentage. The 1931 Rambler Football Club played with navy guernseys, white shorts and red socks and changed to red and white jumpers in 1937, with the B-Grade team still playing with the former guernseys. Ramblers were known as the Redlegs until the 1950s when the current Roosters nickname was adopted.

The Ramblers FC still continues to field junior and senior football and netball teams in the River Murray Football League.

== A-Grade Premiership ==
RMFL (formerly RMFA): 1941, 1950, 1951, 1971, 1975, 1979, 1980, 1981, 1982, 1985, 1987, 2008, 2010, 2012, 2016
