= Phil Gallagher (footballer) =

Australian rules footballer

Personal information
- Full name: Philip Gallagher
- Born: 29 April 1955 (age 71); Adelaide, South Australia
- Original team: Sacred Heart College

Playing career
Years	Club	Games (Goals)
1973–1986	Norwood (SANFL)	292 (216)

Representative team honours
Years	Team	Games (Goals)
- South Australia

Philip Gallagher (b. 29 April 1955) is a former Australian rules footballer who played for the Norwood Football Club in the South Australian National Football League (SANFL).

Gallagher's father Sam Gallagher also represented Norwood.

Outside of football, Gallagher worked as a chartered accountant. After retiring as a player, he served as a League director and club chairman of Norwood from 1996 to 1999.

Gallagher became a member of the South Australian Football Commission in 2000 and currently serves as the Commission's Deputy Chairman.
