= Keith Thomas (footballer, born 1961) =

Australian rules footballer and administrator

Personal information
- Full name: Keith A. Thomas
- Born: 1 September 1961 (age 65)
- Draft: No. 5, 1982 interstate draft
- Height: 179 cm (5 ft 10 in)
- Weight: 78 kg (172 lb)

Playing career^{1}
| Years | Club | Games (Goals) |
| 1979–86, 1989–93 | Norwood | 249 (275) |
| 1987–88 | Fitzroy | 28 (15) |
| Total | | 277 (290) |
- ^{1} Playing statistics correct to the end of 1993.

Keith A. Thomas (born 1 September 1961) is a former Australian rules football player and administrator who played with Norwood in the South Australian National Football League (SANFL) and Fitzroy in the Victorian Football League (VFL). Between 2011 and 2020 he was the chief executive officer of the Port Adelaide Football Club.

== Playing career ==
Thomas had a long career at Norwood, beginning in 1979, and ending in 1993 after he played his 249th league game, as well as 55 pre-season/night series matches. He played in Norwood's 1982 Grand Final victory over Glenelg, and also starred in their 1984 premiership team, being awarded the Jack Oatey Medal. At the end of the 1982 season, he was drafted by the Melbourne Demons but never played with that club in the VFL.

In 1985, he won Norwood's Best and Fairest award and was also runner up on three occasions. Thomas kicked 275 goals in premiership matches over the course of his career in the SANFL, topping his club's goalkicking in 1986.

His time with Norwood was separated by a two-year stint at Fitzroy, where he made a total of 28 VFL appearances.

He also represented South Australia five times during his career, for a career total of 337 senior games.

== Football administrator ==
Keith Thomas was appointed the CEO of the Port Adelaide Football Club in 2011, and served in the role until 31 October 2020. Under his executorship, the club gained independence from its difficult sub-licensing agreement with the SANFL and unified the playing operations in both the AFL and SANFL.

== Honours ==
An interchange bench member of Norwood's official 'Team of the Century', Thomas remained involved in the club after his playing career ended and has served on their committee and as a Director. In 2008 he was inducted into the South Australian Football Hall of Fame.
