= 2026 SANFL season =

147th season of the South Australian National Football League

- Date: 27 March – 20 September 2026
- Teams: 10
- Premiers: Norwood; 32nd premiership
- Runners-up: Sturt; 12th runners-up result
- Minor premiers: Norwood; 21st minor premiership
- Magarey Medal: Nik Rokahr (Norwood – 38 votes)
- Ken Farmer Medallist: Lachlan Hosie (Glenelg – 62 goals)

The 2026 SANFL season (officially known as the SANFL Hostplus League for sponsorship reasons) was the 147th season of the South Australian National Football League (SANFL), the highest-level men's Australian rules football competition in South Australia. The season commenced on 27 March and concluded on 20 September.

Norwood won the premiership for the 32nd time, defeating Sturt by 14 points in the Grand Final. It was the club's second premiership of the decade and brought them within four titles of the record held by Port Adelaide.

== Background ==
The 2026 season marked the 147th season of the competition and the fourth since the competition's return to a full 18-game home-and-away season following the COVID-19 pandemic. The competition continued to consist of ten clubs, including the reserves teams of Adelaide and Port Adelaide. The top five teams at the conclusion of the home-and-away season qualified for the finals series, which culminated in the grand final at Adelaide Oval.

Sturt entered the season as reigning premiers, having defeated Glenelg by 31 points in the 2025 grand final to deny the Bays the opportunity to become the first SANFL club to record three consecutive premierships since the 1950's. Four clubs entered the 2026 season with new senior coaches. West Adelaide appointed former Norwood premiership coach Nathan Bassett, while North Adelaide, Glenelg and Port Adelaide also appointed new senior coaches. Port Adelaide appointed Jacob Surjan to lead its SANFL side.

== Clubs ==
=== Venues and leadership ===
Club	Coach	Captain(s)	Home ground(s)	Capacity	Ref(s)
Adelaide (R)	Matthew Wright	Kieran Strachan	N/A (Note: Under the terms of the agreement governing Adelaide's participation in the competition, the club did not have a designated home ground this season.)	N/A	
Central District	Paul Thomas	Kyle Presbury	X Convenience Oval	18,000	
Glenelg	Matthew Clarke	Liam McBean	Stratarama Stadium	14,000	
North Adelaide	Josh Francou	Alex Spina	Revo Fitness Oval	15,000	
Norwood	Jade Sheedy	Jacob Kennerley	Coopers Stadium	9,700	
Port Adelaide (R)	Jacob Surjan	Jez McLennan	Alberton Oval	8,000	
South Adelaide	Jarrad Wright (until round 9); Jack Maher (from round 10)	Oscar Clavarino	Magain Stadium	10,000	
Sturt	Martin Mattner	Tom Lewis	Thomas Farms Oval	7,000	
West Adelaide	Nathan Bassett	Sam Frost	Richmond Oval	9,000	
Woodville-West Torrens	Sam Jacobs	Riley Knight; James Rowe (co-captains)	Maughan Thiem Kia Oval	11,000	

(R) = reserves team of an Australian Football League (AFL) club

== Home-and-away season ==
- Source: 2026 Season Results at SANFL.com.au

=== Round 1 ===
	Round 1
Friday 27 March (7:40 pm)	Norwood 9.12 (66)	def. by	Sturt 10.11 (71)	Coopers Stadium (crowd: 4,424)	Report
Saturday 28 March (2:10 pm)	South Adelaide 7.7 (49)	def. by	Woodville-West Torrens 15.11 (101)	Magain Stadium (crowd: 1,242)	Report
Saturday 28 March (2:10 pm)	West Adelaide 11.13 (79)	def.	Adelaide 11.6 (72)	Richmond Oval (crowd: 1,151)	Report
Saturday 28 March (4:10 pm)	Central District 11.7 (73)	def. by	North Adelaide 11.12 (78)	X Convenience Oval (crowd: 1,982)	Report
Saturday 28 March (4:10 pm)	Port Adelaide 8.6 (54)	def. by	Glenelg 15.11 (101)	Alberton Oval (crowd: 2,040)	Report

=== Round 2 ===
	Round 2
Thursday 2 April (7:40 pm)	Woodville-West Torrens 12.12 (84)	def.	Adelaide 10.7 (67)	Maughan Thiem Kia Oval	Report
Friday 3 April (2:10 pm)	Glenelg 7.9 (51)	def.	Norwood 6.7 (43)	Stratarama Stadium (crowd: 5,125)	Report
Friday 3 April (2:10 pm)	West Adelaide 11.5 (71)	drew with	Central District 11.5 (71)	Richmond Oval (crowd: 1,366)	Report
Friday 3 April (2:10 pm)	South Adelaide 10.10 (70)	def.	Port Adelaide 8.6 (54)	Magain Stadium (crowd: 1,742)	Report
Friday 3 April (2:30 pm)	North Adelaide 7.8 (50)	def. by	Sturt 15.19 (109)	Revo Fitness Oval (crowd: 5,244)	Report

=== Round 3 ===
	Round 3
Friday 17 April (7:40 pm)	Norwood 10.14 (74)	def.	South Adelaide 7.10 (52)	Coopers Stadium (crowd: 1,871)	Report
Saturday 18 April (2:10 pm)	Central District 11.8 (74)	def. by	Adelaide 12.11 (83)	X Convenience Oval (crowd: 1,355)	Report
Saturday 18 April (2:10 pm)	Glenelg 13.7 (85)	def.	West Adelaide 11.16 (82)	Stratarama Stadium (crowd: 2,686)	Report
Sunday 19 April (2:10 pm)	Port Adelaide 11.8 (74)	def. by	North Adelaide 14.7 (91)	Alberton Oval (crowd: 1,421)	Report
Sunday 19 April (2:10 pm)	Sturt 14.11 (95)	def. by	Woodville-West Torrens 15.7 (97)	Thomas Farms Oval (crowd: 3,251)	Report

=== Round 4 ===
	Round 4
Friday 24 April (7:40 pm)	Norwood 9.14 (68)	def.	Port Adelaide 9.7 (61)	Coopers Stadium	Report
Friday 24 April (7:40 pm)	Woodville-West Torrens 16.14 (110)	def.	West Adelaide 10.9 (69)	Maughan Thiem Kia Oval	Report
Saturday 25 April (2:10 pm)	North Adelaide 9.6 (60)	def. by	Adelaide 10.13 (73)	Revo Fitness Oval (crowd: 2,588)	Report
Saturday 25 April (2:30 pm)	Sturt 9.11 (65)	def. by	Glenelg 11.16 (82)	Thomas Farms Oval (crowd: 4,059)	Report
Sunday 26 April (1:10 pm)	South Adelaide 19.5 (119)	def.	Central District 12.13 (85)	Magain Stadium (crowd: 992)	Report

=== Round 5 ===
	Round 5
Friday 1 May (4:30 pm)	Adelaide 15.8 (98)	def. by	Port Adelaide 18.10 (118)	Adelaide Oval	Report
Saturday 2 May (2:10 pm)	Glenelg 7.12 (54)	def. by	South Adelaide 11.10 (76)	Stratarama Stadium (crowd: 1,784)	Report
Saturday 2 May (2:10 pm)	Central District 2.10 (22)	def. by	Norwood 10.11 (71)	X Convenience Oval (crowd: 1,477)	Report
Sunday 3 May (2:10 pm)	West Adelaide 9.11 (65)	def.	Sturt 8.13 (61)	Hisense Stadium (crowd: 1,582)	Report
Sunday 3 May (2:10 pm)	North Adelaide 3.10 (28)	def. by	Woodville-West Torrens 15.7 (97)	Revo Fitness Oval (crowd: 1,973)	Report

=== Round 6 ===
	Round 6
Saturday 9 May (1:30 pm)	Norwood 21.8 (134)	def.	West Adelaide 4.7 (31)	Centenary Oval (crowd: 1,467)	Report
Saturday 9 May (2:10 pm)	Port Adelaide 13.6 (84)	def.	Central District 12.7 (79)	Alberton Oval (crowd: 1,167)	Report
Saturday 9 May (2:10 pm)	South Adelaide 12.5 (77)	def. by	North Adelaide 15.9 (99)	Magain Stadium (crowd: 891)	Report
Saturday 9 May (2:10 pm)	Woodville-West Torrens 7.10 (52)	def. by	Glenelg 11.9 (75)	Maughan Thiem Kia Oval (crowd: 1,484)	Report
Saturday 9 May (2:10 pm)	Sturt 18.9 (117)	def.	Adelaide 10.9 (69)	Thomas Farms Oval (crowd: 2,438)	Report

=== Round 7 ===
	Round 7
Saturday 23 May (2:10 pm)	North Adelaide 7.6 (48)	def. by	Norwood 18.9 (117)	Revo Fitness Oval	Report
Saturday 23 May (2:10 pm)	Sturt 15.15 (105)	def.	Central District 4.7 (31)	Thomas Farms Oval	Report
Saturday 23 May (2:10 pm)	South Adelaide 14.9 (93)	def.	West Adelaide 9.14 (68)	Magain Stadium	Report
Saturday 23 May (2:10 pm)	Glenelg 10.14 (74)	def. by	Adelaide 12.9 (81)	Stratarama Stadium	Report
Saturday 23 May (2:10 pm)	Woodville-West Torrens 20.9 (129)	def.	Port Adelaide 6.7 (43)	Maughan Thiem Kia Oval	Report
Taylor Walker (Adelaide) played his first SANFL match since 2014.

=== Round 8 ===
	Round 8
Saturday 30 May (2:10 pm)	Central District 7.14 (56)	def.	West Adelaide 6.10 (46)	X Convenience Oval	Report
Sunday 31 May (2:10 pm)	South Adelaide 11.8 (74)	def. by	Sturt 15.13 (103)	Magain Stadium	Report
Sunday 31 May (2:10 pm)	Norwood 13.15 (93)	def.	Woodville-West Torrens 7.7 (49)	Coopers Stadium	Report
Sunday 31 May (2:10 pm)	North Adelaide 5.11 (41)	def. by	Glenelg 13.8 (86)	Revo Fitness Oval	Report
Byes: Adelaide, Port Adelaide

=== Round 9 ===
	Round 9
Saturday 6 June (2:10 pm)	Woodville-West Torrens 9.11 (65)	def.	Central District 8.11 (59)	Maughan Thiem Kia Oval	Report
Saturday 6 June (2:10 pm)	West Adelaide 8.8 (56)	def. by	North Adelaide 8.13 (61)	Hisense Stadium	Report
Saturday 6 June (2:10 pm)	South Adelaide 10.6 (66)	def. by	Adelaide 17.8 (110)	Magain Stadium	Report
Saturday 6 June (2:10 pm)	Glenelg 17.9 (111)	def.	Port Adelaide 9.8 (62)	Stratarama Stadium	Report
Monday 8 June (2:10 pm)	Sturt 12.7 (79)	def. by	Norwood 13.4 (82)	Thomas Farms Oval	Report

=== Round 10 ===
	Round 10
Saturday 13 June (2:10 pm)	North Adelaide 12.8 (80)	def.	Adelaide 12.7 (79)	Revo Fitness Oval	Report
Saturday 13 June (2:10 pm)	Woodville-West Torrens 8.11 (59)	def.	South Adelaide 3.4 (22)	Maughan Thiem Kia Oval	Report
Sunday 14 June (2:10 pm)	Port Adelaide 11.11 (77)	def. by	West Adelaide 12.14 (86)	Alberton Oval	Report
Byes: Central District, Glenelg, Norwood, Sturt

=== Round 11 ===
	Round 11
Saturday 20 June (2:10 pm)	Central District 9.10 (64)	def. by	Glenelg 10.11 (71)	X Convenience Oval	Report
Sunday 21 June (2:10 pm)	Sturt 17.9 (111)	def.	Port Adelaide 10.9 (69)	Thomas Farms Oval	Report
Sunday 21 June (2:10 pm)	Norwood 19.7 (121)	def.	Adelaide 7.13 (55)	Coopers Stadium	Report
Byes: North Adelaide, South Adelaide, West Adelaide, Woodville-West Torrens

=== Round 12 ===
	Round 12
Saturday 27 June (2:10 pm)	Glenelg 11.11 (77)	def.	Sturt 10.6 (66)	Stratarama Stadium	Report
Saturday 27 June (2:10 pm)	North Adelaide 8.7 (55)	def. by	Central District 10.16 (76)	Revo Fitness Oval	Report
Saturday 27 June (2:10 pm)	West Adelaide 14.7 (91)	def.	Woodville-West Torrens 7.7 (49)	Hisense Stadium	Report
Saturday 27 June (3:10 pm)	Port Adelaide 12.5 (77)	def. by	Adelaide 19.15 (129)	Adelaide Oval	Report
Sunday 28 June (2:10 pm)	South Adelaide 7.12 (54)	def. by	Norwood 20.10 (130)	Magain Stadium	Report

=== Round 13 ===
	Round 13
Saturday 4 July (1:10 pm)	Central District 8.8 (56)	def. by	Adelaide 16.10 (106	X Convenience Oval	Report
Saturday 4 July (2:10 pm)	Woodville-West Torrens 13.4 (82)	def.	North Adelaide 7.4 (46)	Maughan Thiem Kia Oval	Report
Saturday 4 July (2:10 pm)	Sturt 10.14 (74)	def.	West Adelaide 10.10 (70)	Thomas Farms Oval	Report
Saturday 4 July (2:10 pm)	Port Adelaide 6.6 (42)	def. by	South Adelaide 16.8 (104)	Alberton Oval	Report
Saturday 4 July (4:30 pm)	Norwood 8.8 (56)	def. by	Glenelg 9.10 (64)	Coopers Stadium	Report

=== Round 14 ===
	Round 14
Saturday 11 July (2:10 pm)	Woodville-West Torrens 5.4 (34)	def. by	Sturt 9.6 (60)	Maughan Thiem Kia Oval	Report
Saturday 11 July (2:10 pm)	West Adelaide 7.9 (51)	def. by	Norwood 10.8 (68)	Richmond Oval	Report
Saturday 11 July (4:10 pm)	Central District 12.14 (86)	def.	South Adelaide 2.8 (20)	Barossa Park	Report
Sunday 12 July (2:10 pm)	Glenelg 8.13 (61)	def.	Adelaide 8.10 (58)	Stratarama Stadium	Report
Sunday 12 July (2:20 pm)	North Adelaide 13.11 (89)	def.	Port Adelaide 4.8 (32)	Revo Fitness Oval	Report

=== Round 15 ===
	Round 15
Saturday 18 July (2:10 pm)	West Adelaide 12.11 (83)	def. by	Adelaide 13.16 (94)	Hisense Stadium	Report
Saturday 18 July (7:10 pm)	Port Adelaide 15.5 (95)	def.	Woodville-West Torrens 10.11 (71)	Alberton Oval	Report
Sunday 19 July (2:10 pm)	South Adelaide 7.5 (47)	def. by	Glenelg 17.6 (108)	Magain Stadium	Report
Sunday 19 July (2:10 pm)	Sturt 12.15 (87)	def.	North Adelaide 10.12 (72)	Thomas Farms Oval	Report
Sunday 19 July (2:40 pm)	Norwood 14.13 (97)	def.	Central District 13.6 (84)	Coopers Stadium	Report

=== Round 16 ===
	Round 16
Saturday 1 August (2:10 pm)	Central District 4.11 (35)	def. by	Sturt 13.7 (85)	X Convenience Oval	Report
Saturday 1 August (2:10 pm)	West Adelaide 11.9 (75)	def.	North Adelaide 6.8 (44)	Hisense Stadium	Report
Saturday 1 August (2:10 pm)	South Adelaide 16.7 (103)	def.	Adelaide 13.7 (85)	Magain Stadium	Report
Saturday 1 August (2:40 pm)	Glenelg 15.17 (107)	def.	Woodville-West Torrens 6.6 (42)	Stratarama Stadium	Report
Sunday 2 August (1:10 pm)	Port Adelaide 3.8 (26)	def. by	Norwood 14.12 (96)	Alberton Oval	Report

=== Round 17 ===
	Round 17
Saturday 8 August (12:40 pm)	Norwood 21.10 (136)	def.	North Adelaide 9.6 (60)	Coopers Stadium	Report
Saturday 8 August (2:10 pm)	Sturt 19.11 (125)	def.	South Adelaide 11.10 (76)	Thomas Farms Oval	Report
Saturday 8 August (2:30 pm)	Glenelg 11.10 (76)	def.	Central District 10.12 (72)	Stratarama Stadium	Report
Sunday 9 August (1:10 pm)	Woodville-West Torrens 11.11 (77)	def.	Adelaide 10.10 (70)	Maughan Thiem Kia Oval	Report
Sunday 9 August (2:10 pm)	West Adelaide 19.14 (128)	def.	Port Adelaide 3.5 (23)	Hisense Stadium	Report

=== Round 18 ===
	Round 18
Friday 14 August (7:40 pm)	Norwood 16.10 (106)	def.	Adelaide 7.10 (52)	Coopers Stadium	Report
Saturday 15 August (1:10 pm)	Port Adelaide 11.8 (74)	def. by	Sturt 17.11 (113)	Alberton Oval	Report
Saturday 15 August (2:10 pm)	North Adelaide 6.9 (45)	def. by	South Adelaide 14.12 (96)	Revo Fitness Oval	Report
Saturday 15 August (2:10 pm)	Central District 10.6 (66)	def.	Woodville-West Torrens 9.9 (63)	X Convenience Oval	Report
Saturday 15 August (2:10 pm)	West Adelaide 8.8 (56)	def.	Glenelg 5.7 (37)	Hisense Stadium	Report

=== Round 19 ===
	Round 19
Saturday 22 August (2:10 pm)	Glenelg 15.10 (100)	def.	North Adelaide 8.11 (59)	Stratarama Stadium	Report
Saturday 22 August (2:10 pm)	Central District 19.10 (124)	def.	Port Adelaide 9.5 (59)	X Convenience Oval	Report
Saturday 22 August (2:10 pm)	Woodville-West Torrens 9.4 (58)	def. by	Norwood 17.8 (110)	Maughan Thiem Kia Oval	Report
Saturday 22 August (2:10 pm)	West Adelaide 7.9 (51)	def. by	South Adelaide 11.6 (72)	Richmond Oval	Report
Saturday 22 August (2:10 pm)	Sturt 16.9 (105)	def.	Adelaide 11.11 (77)	Thomas Farms Oval	Report

== Ladder ==
Pos	Team	Pld	W	L	D	PF	PA	PP	Pts	Qualification
1	Norwood (P)	18	15	3	0	1668	968	63.28	30	Finals series
2	Glenelg	18	15	3	0	1420	1076	56.89	30	Finals series
3	Sturt	18	13	5	0	1631	1200	57.61	26	Finals series
4	Woodville-West Torrens	18	10	8	0	1319	1245	51.44	20	Finals series
5	West Adelaide	18	8	9	1	1263	1276	49.74	17	Finals series
6	South Adelaide	18	8	10	0	1270	1479	46.20	16	
7	Adelaide (R)	18	7	11	0	1458	1541	48.62	14	
8	Central District	18	5	12	1	1213	1354	47.25	11	
9	North Adelaide	18	5	13	0	1101	1530	41.85	10	
10	Port Adelaide (R)	18	3	15	0	1124	1798	38.47	6	

Source: sanfl.com.au
Rules for classification: 1) points; 2) percentage; 3) number of points for.
(P) Premiers

(R) = Reserves for AFL Seniors

== Finals series ==
=== Week one – Qualifying and elimination finals ===
	Elimination final
Sunday 30 August (12:15 pm)	Woodville-West Torrens 10.7 (67)	def.	West Adelaide 8.14 (62)	Adelaide Oval	Report

	Qualifying final
Sunday 30 August (3:15 pm)	Glenelg 12.12 (84)	def. by	Sturt 13.8 (86)	Adelaide Oval	Report

=== Week two – Semi-finals ===
	First Semi-final
Sunday 6 September (12:15 pm)	Glenelg 11.13 (79)	def. by	Woodville-West Torrens 13.5 (83)	Adelaide Oval	Report

	Second Semi-final
Sunday 6 September (3:15 pm)	Norwood 8.10 (58)	def.	Sturt 5.9 (39)	Adelaide Oval	Report

=== Week three – Preliminary final ===
Preliminary final
Sunday, 13 September (3:15 pm)	Sturt	def.	Woodville-West Torrens	Adelaide Oval	Report
1.5 (11); 5.10 (40); 7.14 (56); 13.16 (94)	Q1; Q2; Q3; Final	3.3 (21); 6.3 (39); 7.5 (47); 8.7 (55)	Television broadcast: Seven Network
Johnson 6 Burrows, Emmett 2 Conforti, Rawlinson, Slade 1	Goals	Herbert 3 Ballenden 2 D'Aloia, N. Hayes, Sladojevic 1

=== Week four – Grand Final ===
2026 SANFL Grand Final
Sunday 20 September (2:30 pm)	Norwood	def.	Sturt	Adelaide Oval (crowd: 38,340)
4.4 (28); 5.5 (35); 8.6 (54); 13.9 (87)	Q1; Q2; Q3; Final	3.2 (20); 5.5 (35); 11.6 (72); 11.7 (73)	Jack Oatey Medal: Baynen Lowe (Norwood); Television broadcast: Seven Network
Binder 4 Callow, Lowe 2 Hamilton, Heard, Ling, Murley, Swinnerton 1	Goals	Emmett 3 Hone, Johnson 2 Burrows, Fahey-Sparks, McEntee, Rawlinson 1
The 38,340 spectators in attendance was the biggest since 2019 and the 10th time in 14 years the Grand Final attracted over 30,000 fans.

== Awards ==
- Magarey Medal

Nik Rokahr – 38 votes (Norwood)

- Ken Farmer Medal

Lachlan Hosie – 62 goals (Glenelg)

- R.O Shearman Medal

Nik Rokahr – 111 votes (Norwood)

- Stanley H. Lewis Trophy

Norwood

- Reserves Premiers

South Adelaide

- Under 18s Premiers

Glenelg

- Under 16s Premiers

Glenelg

2026 SANFL Team of the Year
B:	Cooper Murley (Norwood)	Will Coomblas (Sturt)	Cody Raak (North Adelaide)
HB:	Harley Sparks (South Adelaide)	Aaron Francis (Norwood)	Jonty Scharenberg (Glenelg)
C:	Josh Fahey (Central District)	Tom Lewis (Sturt) (c)	Kobe Ryan (West Adelaide)
HF:	Blake Drury (Adelaide)	Finn Heard (Norwood)	Corey Lyons (Glenelg)
F:	Jack Delean (South Adelaide)	Lachie Hosie (Glenelg)	Tristan Binder (Norwood)
Foll:	Reilly O’Brien (Adelaide)	Ted Clohesy (Woodville-West Torrens)	Nik Rokahr (Norwood)
Int:	Chris Burgess (West Adelaide)	Angus Schumacher (North Adelaide)	Oliver Davis (South Adelaide)
Int:	Will Snelling (Sturt)		
Coach:	Jade Sheedy (Norwood)		

== Representative matches ==
=== SANFL vs VFL ===
For the third successive season, an interstate representative match was arranged against the Victorian Football League (VFL). As was the case with the 2025 fixture, the match was timed to coincide with the AFL's Gather Round fixtures in Adelaide. The match was held as part of a double-header with the equivalent women's interstate match.

2026 State Game
Saturday, 11 April (2:30pm ACST)	SANFL	def. by	VFL	Stratarama Stadium
5.4 (34); 7.9 (51); 12.10 (82); 14.14 (98)	Q1; Q2; Q3; Final	3.3 (21); 7.8 (50); 11.11 (77); 15.13 (103)	Fos Williams Medal (SANFL) & Frank Johnson Medal (VFL): Tom Lewis (SANFL) & Riley Bonner (VFL); Television broadcast: Seven Network & AFL.com.au
Scully 3 McBean, Allan, Doyle 2 Hosie, Emmett, Beattie, Murley, Ryan 1	Goals	Podhajski 4 Clarke, Hagan, Brew, Tarrant 2 Hately, Billings, Declase 1
Lewis, Ryan, Scharenberg, Scully, Doyle	Best	Bonner, Hately, Bell, Parks, Podhajski

==== South Australian team ====
2026 SANFL State Team vs. Victoria
B:	4. Cooper Murley; (Norwood)	19. Will Coomblas; (Sturt)	23. Oscar Clavarino; (South Adelaide)
HB:	3. Jonty Scharenberg; (Glenelg)	24. Zac Becker; (Sturt)	16. Luca Whitelum; (Central District)
C:	1. Frank Szekely; (North Adelaide)	12. Tom Lewis; (Sturt)	22. Matt Allen; (Glenelg)
HF:	5. Sam Conforti; (Sturt)	27. Tom Scully; (West Adelaide)	17. Tom Emmett; (Sturt)
F:	20. Lachlan Hosie; (Glenelg)	10. Liam McBean (c); (Glenelg)	6. Max Beattie; (Woodville-West Torrens)
Foll:	25. Amos Doyle; (Sturt)	13. Baynen Lowe; (Norwood)	14. Oliver Davis; (South Adelaide)
Int:	21. Finn Heard; (Norwood)	9. Kobe Ryan; (West Adelaide)	11. Jed McEntee; (Sturt)
Int:	18. Aaron Francis; (Norwood)	7. Martin Frederick; (Sturt)	
Coach:	Martin Mattner (Sturt)		
Emg:	8. Corey Lyons; (Glenelg)	26. Alex Van Wyk; (North Adelaide)	2. Ethan Grace; (Woodville-West Torrens)

=== WAFL vs SANFL ===
For the eighth successive season, an interstate representative match was fixtured between the SANFL and West Australian Football League (WAFL), with the two teams playing for the Haydn Bunton Junior Cup.

2026 State Game
Saturday, 16 May (3:10pm AWST)	WAFL	def.	SANFL	Sullivan Logistics Stadium (crowd: 3,671)
4.1 (25); 9.4 (58); 11.9 (75); 14.14 (98)	Q1; Q2; Q3; Final	2.2 (14); 3.3 (21); 4.6 (30); 9.8 (62)	Simpson Medal (WAFL) & Fos Williams Medal (SANFL): Callan England (WAFL) & Beau Thomas (SANFL); Television broadcast: Seven Network
Hinder 3 Hunter, Reidy 2 Bevan, Clarke, Davis, Jones, Mainwaring, Mayo, Sears 1	Goals	A. Grace, Thomas 3 Emmett, Francis, Herbert 1
England, Bevan, Turner, Mayo, Ameduri, Hinder, Reidy	Best	Thomas, Lowe, E. Grace, A. Grace, Francis

==== South Australian team ====
2026 SANFL State Team vs. Western Australia
B:	8. Joshua Hone; (Sturt)	21. Finn Heard; (Norwood)	25. Beau Thomas; (Central District)
HB:	12. Kade Herbert; (Woodville-West Torrens)	17. Tom Emmett; (Sturt)	6. Max Beattie; (Woodville-West Torrens)
C:	19. Jacob Kennerley; (Norwood)	10. Tom Lewis (c); (Sturt)	7. Martin Frederick; (Sturt)
HF:	20. Jez McLennan; (Port Adelaide)	18. Aaron Francis; (Norwood)	16. Luca Whitlum; (Central District)
F:	4. Cooper Murley; (Norwood)	23. Thomas Donnelly; (Norwood)	2. Ethan Grace; (Woodville-West Torrens)
Foll:	27. Caleb May; (West Adelaide)	13. Baynen Lowe; (Norwood)	3. Ted Clohesy; (Woodville-West Torrens)
Int:	15. Aiden Grace; (Central District)	5. Sam Conforti; (Sturt)	14. Finn Emilie-Brennan; (South Adelaide)
Int:	24. Lukas Cooke; (Woodville-West Torrens)	9. Nik Rokahr; (Norwood)	
Coach:	Martin Mattner (Sturt)		
Emg:	26. Alex Van Wyk; (North Adelaide)	11. Jack Delean; (South Adelaide)	1. Patrick Parnell; (Glenelg)

== See also ==
- 2026 SANFL Women's League season
