= Jack Oatey Medal =

Australian rules football award

- League: South Australian National Football League
- Awarded for: The best on ground in the SANFL Grand Final

History
- First award: 1981
- First winner: Russell Ebert
- Most wins: Chris Gowans (2)
- Most recent: Baynen Lowe (2026)

The Jack Oatey Medal is awarded to the best player during the SANFL Grand Final. It has been awarded since 1981. In 2018, Mitch Grigg of Norwood became the first player to win the Jack Oatey Medal on a losing team, after his team were defeated by North Adelaide in the 2018 SANFL Grand Final.

== Winners ==
Table key
^	Player was member of losing team

Table of recipients
Year	Recipient	Club	Ref
1981	Russell Ebert	Port Adelaide	
1982	Danny Jenkins	Norwood	
1983	Ian Borchard	West Adelaide	
1984	Keith Thomas	Norwood	
1985	Stephen Kernahan	Glenelg	
1986	Tony Hall	Glenelg	
1987	Michael Parsons	North Adelaide	
1988	Bruce Abernethy	Port Adelaide	
1989	Russell Johnston	Port Adelaide	
1990	George Fiacchi	Port Adelaide	
1991	Darel Hart	North Adelaide	
1992	Nathan Buckley	Port Adelaide	
1993	Steven Sziller	Woodville-West Torrens	
1994	Darryl Wakelin	Port Adelaide	
1995	Anthony Darcy	Port Adelaide	
1996	David Brown	Port Adelaide	
1997	John Cunningham	Norwood	
1998	Brett Chalmers	Port Adelaide	
1999	Darryl Poole	Port Adelaide	
2000	James Gowans	Central District	
2001	Rick Macgowan	Central District	
2002	Matthew Powell	Sturt	
2003	Chris Gowans	Central District	
2004	Nathan Steinberner	Central District	
2005	Luke McCabe	Central District	
2006	Hayden Skipworth	Woodville-West Torrens	
2007	Chris Gowans	Central District	
2008	Jason MacKenzie	Central District	
2009	Trent Goodrem	Central District	
2010	Ian Callinan	Central District	
2011	Craig Parry	Woodville-West Torrens	
2012	Dean Terlich	Norwood	
2013	Brett Zorzi	Norwood	
2014	Matthew Panos	Norwood	
2015	Chris Schmidt	West Adelaide	
2016	Jack Stephens	Sturt	
2017	Fraser Evans	Sturt	
2018	Mitch Grigg^	Norwood	
2019	Matthew Snook	Glenelg	
2020	Jordan Foote	Woodville-West Torrens	
2021	Jack Hayes	Woodville-West Torrens	
2022	Harry Boyd	Norwood	
2023	Lachlan Hosie	Glenelg	
2024	Liam McBean	Glenelg	
2025	Angus Anderson	Sturt	
2026	Baynen Lowe	Norwood	

=== Club totals ===
Table of clubs' totals
Club	Total	Years
Port Adelaide	10	1981, 1988, 1989, 1990, 1992, 1994, 1995, 1996, 1998, 1999
Central District	9	2000, 2001, 2003, 2004, 2005, 2007, 2008, 2009, 2010
Norwood	9	1982, 1984, 1997, 2012, 2013, 2014, 2018, 2022, 2026
Woodville-West Torrens	5	1993, 2006, 2011, 2020, 2021
Glenelg	5	1985, 1986, 2019, 2023, 2024
Sturt	4	2002, 2016, 2017, 2025
West Adelaide	2	1983, 2015
North Adelaide	2	1987, 1991
South Adelaide	0	—
Adelaide	0	—

== Best on ground before award ==
Before the inception of the Jack Oatey Medal there was no official award for the best on ground in SANFL Grand Finals. However the media would often arrive at a consensus as to who was the best player on the ground.

Year	Best on ground (media consensus)	Club	Ref
1951	Allen Greer (The Mail, The Advertiser)	Port Adelaide	
1951	Peter Marrett (The Mail, The Advertiser)	Port Adelaide	
1952	Doug Olds (The Advertiser, The News)	Norwood	
1953	Mick Clingly (The Mail, The News)	West Torrens	
