= 2010 SANFL Grand Final =

Central District	Norwood
10.11 (71)	9.11 (65)
	1	2	3	4
CD	4.1 (25)	4.5 (29)	9.11 (65)	10.11 (71)
NOR	1.1 (7)	7.4 (46)	7.6 (48)	9.11 (65)
- Date: Sunday 3 October 2010
- Stadium: Football Park
- Attendance: 34,355
- Umpires: Williams, Fila, Haussen

The 2010 South Australian National Football League (SANFL) Grand Final saw the Central District Bulldogs defeat Norwood by 6 points to claim the club's ninth premiership victory.

The match was played on Sunday 3 October 2010 at Football Park in front of a crowd of 34,355.

== Teams ==
Central District was captained by Paul Thomas and coached by Roy Laird.

Central District
B:	Jay Nash	Heath Lawry	Lee Spurr
HB:	Paul Thomas (C)	Yves Sibenaler	Jack Gunston
C:	Brayden O'Hara	James Gowans	Trent Goodrem
HF:	Kyle Jenner	Daniel Schell	Chris Gowans
F:	Andrew Hayes	Daniel Havelberg	James Boyd
Foll:	Jason Mackenzie (VC)	Ryan Williams	Ian Callinan
Int:	Jason F Sutherland	Scott Dutschke	Eddie Sansbury
Coach:	Roy Laird		

Norwood
B:			
HB:			
C:			
HF:			
F:			
Foll:			
Int:	TBA	TBA	TBA

The Jack Oatey Medal for the best player on the ground was won by Central's Ian Callinan.
