= 2003 SANFL Grand Final =

Central District	West Adelaide
17.9 (111)	11.11 (77)
	1	2	3	4
CD	5.1 (31)	10.4 (64)	14.7 (91)	17.9 (111)
WA	3.3 (21)	5.5 (35)	9.6 (60)	11.11 (77)
- Date: 5 October 2003
- Stadium: Football Park
- Attendance: 28,199
- Umpires: Dey, Pfeiffer, Fox
- Coin toss won by: West Adelaide

The 2003 South Australian National Football League (SANFL) Grand Final saw the Central District Bulldogs defeat West Adelaide by 34 points to claim the club's third premiership victory.

The match was played on Sunday 5 October 2003 at Football Park in front of a crowd of 28,199.

Coin Toss was performed by Mark Ricciuto, from Adelaide Football Club, joint winner of the 2003 Brownlow Medal and was won by West Adelaide.

The Jack Oatey Medal for the best player on the ground was won by Central's Chris Gowans.

== Teams ==
Central District was captained by Daniel Healy and coached by Roy Laird. West Adelaide was captained by Ed Richardson and coached by Shaun Rehn. Both coaches were past players of their respective clubs and in their first senior season of coaching.

Central District
B:	Yves Sibenaler	Quinton Graham	Tyson Hay
HB:	Paul Thomas	Brian Haraida	Brent Guerra
C:	Adam Switala	James Gowans	Simon Arnott
HF:	Chris Gowans	Luke Cowan	Eddie Sansbury
F:	Daniel Healy (C)	Daniel Schell	Matthew Slade
Foll:	Paul Scoullar	Heath Hopwood	Marco Bello
Int:	Nathan Steinberner	Richard Cochrane Jnr	Damien Arnold
Coach:	Roy Laird		

West Adelaide
B:	Ed Richardson (C)	Chris Chubb	Jason Porplyzia
HB:	Luke Donaldson	Ben Rutten	Domenic Cassisi
C:	Adam Cooney	Luke Nathan	David Piasente
HF:	Shane Tuck	Brad Dabrowski	Luke Norman
F:	Shannon Rusca	Darren Bradshaw	Sam Fisher
Foll:	Ben Marsh	Dean Howard	Salim Hassan
Int:	Paul Koulouriotis	Dion Myles	Scott Hahn
Coach:	Shaun Rehn		
