= James Bell (Australian footballer) =

Australian rules footballer

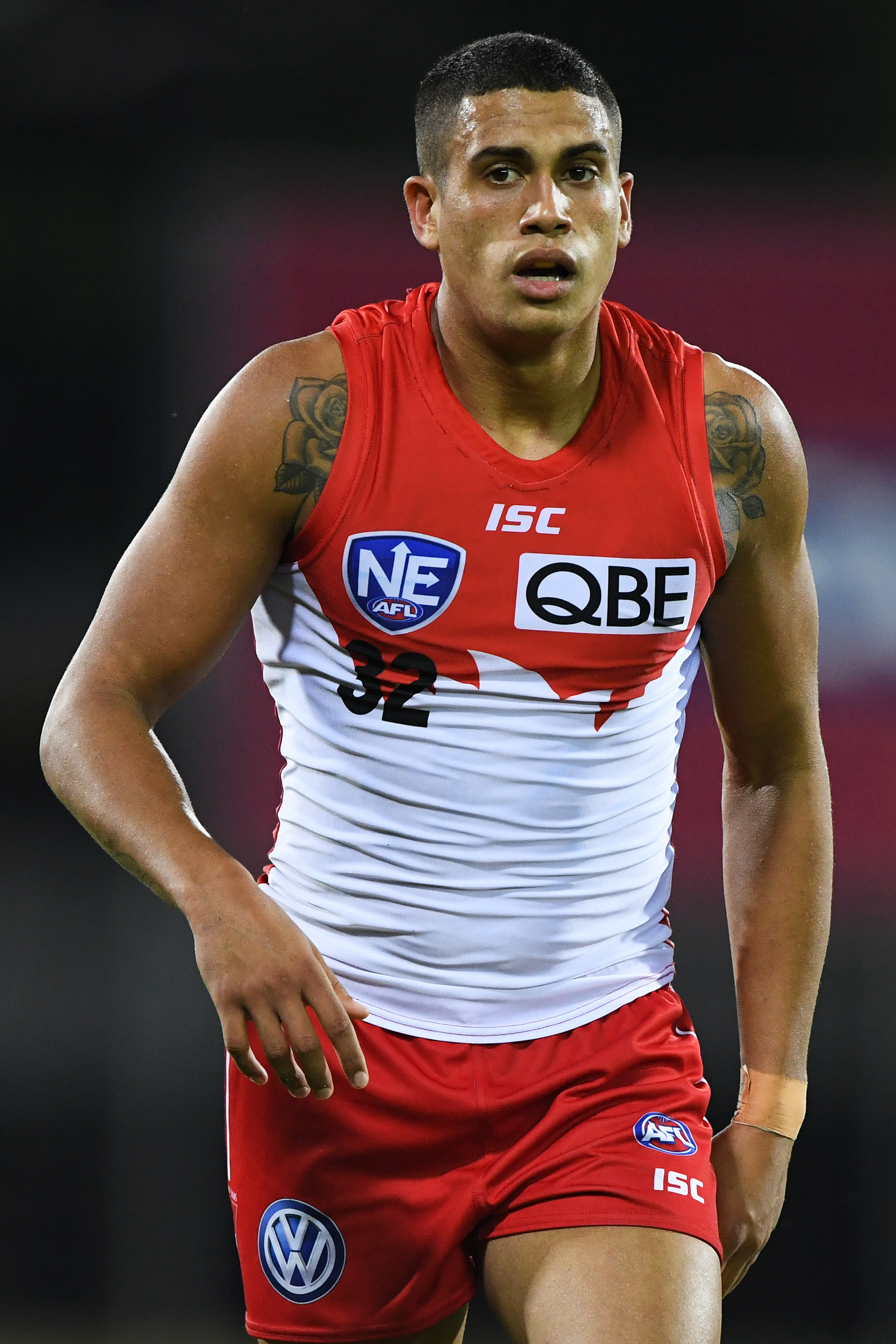
- Bell playing for Sydney in July 2019

Personal information
- Full name: James Bell
- Born: 10 February 1999 (age 27); Shellharbour, New South Wales
- Original team: Shellharbour Swans (AFL South Coast)/Sydney Swans Academy
- Draft: Category B Rookie Selection, 2017 rookie draft
- Height: 183 cm (6 ft 0 in)
- Weight: 81 kg (179 lb)
- Position: Midfielder

Club information
- Current club: Greater Western Sydney

Playing career^{1}
Years	Club	Games (Goals)
2018-2022	Sydney	28 (10)
2027-	Greater Western Sydney	0 (0)
- ^{1} Playing statistics correct to the end of the 2022 season.

Career highlights
- SANFL premiership player: 2023, 2024; Glenelg best and fairest: 2024

James Bell (born 10 February 1999) is a former professional Australian rules footballer who played for the Sydney Swans in the Australian Football League (AFL).

== Early life ==
Bell was born and raised in Shellharbour in the Illawarra region of New South Wales and is of Indigenous Australian heritage (Yuin). He grew up playing soccer and was linked to the Western Sydney Wanderers for a number of years as a teenager. He began playing Australian rules football at the age of 13 and was placed in the Sydney Swans developmental academy shortly after. When Bell was 15, he was given an ultimatum to choose between his two sporting interests and elected to pursue Australian rules football after attending a three-day training camp with his childhood idol - Sydney Swans player and two-time Brownlow Medallist Adam Goodes. Bell subsequently moved to Sydney and joined the club's academy program full-time. The decision paid off when the Swans elected to pre-select Bell as a Category B rookie during the 2017 AFL draft.

== AFL career ==
Bell made his AFL debut for Sydney in 2019 in their round 21 fixture against Port Adelaide.

== Statistics ==
Updated to the end of the 2022 season.

Legend
G	Goals	K	Kicks	D	Disposals	T	Tackles
B	Behinds	H	Handballs	M	Marks

Season	Team	No.	Games	Totals							Averages (per game)						
Season	Team	No.	Games	G	B	K	H	D	M	T	G	B	K	H	D	M	T
2017	Sydney	32	0	–	–	–	–	–	–	–	–	–	–	–	–	–	–
2018	Sydney	32	0	–	–	–	–	–	–	–	–	–	–	–	–	–	–
2019	Sydney	32	2	1	1	9	5	14	7	5	0.5	0.5	4.5	2.5	7.0	3.5	2.5
2020 (Note: The 2020 season was played with 17 home-and-away matches per team (down from 22) and 16-minute quarters with time on (down from 20-minute quarters with time on) due to the impact of the COVID-19 pandemic.)	Sydney	32	8	3	2	37	32	69	13	28	0.4	0.3	4.6	4.0	8.6	1.6	3.5
2021	Sydney	32	12	2	2	38	37	75	24	25	0.2	0.2	3.2	3.1	6.3	2.0	2.1
2022	Sydney	32	6	4	3	33	12	45	15	9	0.7	0.5	5.5	2.0	7.5	2.5	1.5
Career			28	10	8	117	86	203	59	67	0.4	0.3	4.2	3.1	7.3	2.1	2.4
