= 2025 SANFL season =

146th season of the South Australian National Football League

- Date: 28 March – 21 September 2025
- Teams: 10
- Premiers: Sturt; 16th premiership
- Runners-up: Glenelg
- Minor premiers: Sturt; 10th minor premiership
- Magarey Medallist: Tom Lewis (Sturt – 33 votes)
- Ken Farmer Medallist: Lachie Hosie (Glenelg – 65 goals)

The 2025 SANFL season (officially known as the SANFL Hostplus League for sponsorship reasons) was the 146th season of the South Australian National Football League (SANFL), the highest-level Australian rules football competition in South Australia. The season began on 28 March and concluded on 21 September.

== Background ==
=== Playing list rules for AFL clubs ===
The player acquisition and list rules for the league's AFL clubs, Adelaide and Port Adelaide, were modified by the South Australian Football Commission ahead of the 2025 season. The AFL clubs will be able to access state Under-18 Academy players for a four-week period after the AFL National Championships. Both clubs will be able to sign up to six SANFL players aged 20 years or under, via an expanded Talent Development List protocol, plus two players from interstate. The long-standing sole marquee player permit was abolished, with the clubs now able to list up to four players aged over 21 from SANFL clubs, or from interstate competitions such as the VFL, WAFL or AFL. The changes were adopted following months of speculation that Port Adelaide and Adelaide would seek to move to the VFL or expedite the formation of a national reserves competition, due to a perceived view the SANFL rules for the AFL clubs had hampered player development and prevented an even competition.

== Home-and-away season ==
=== Round 1 ===
	Round 1
Friday 28 March (7:10 pm)	Port Adelaide 4.10 (34)	def. by	Glenelg 14.14 (98)	Alberton Oval (crowd: 2,009)
Saturday 29 March (2:10 pm)	Central District 9.12 (66)	def.	Woodville-West Torrens 10.5 (65)	X Convenience Oval (crowd: 2,034)
Saturday 29 March (2:10 pm)	West Adelaide 4.7 (31)	def. by	Adelaide 18.18 (126)	Hisense Stadium (crowd: 1,362)
Saturday 29 March (2:10 pm)	South Adelaide 8.7 (55)	def. by	Sturt 12.9 (81)	Magain Stadium (crowd: 1,760)
Saturday 29 March (7:10 pm)	Norwood 5.5 (35)	def. by	North Adelaide 8.19 (67)	Coopers Stadium (crowd: 3,361)

=== Round 2 ===
	Round 2
Saturday 5 April (2:10 pm)	South Adelaide 9.12 (66)	def.	West Adelaide 9.8 (62)	Magain Stadium (crowd: 1,089)
Saturday 5 April (2:10 pm)	Sturt 16.11 (107)	def.	Port Adelaide 12.6 (78)	Thomas Farms Oval (crowd: 2,293)
Saturday 5 April (2:40 pm)	North Adelaide 13.7 (85)	def. by	Adelaide 17.12 (114)	Prospect Oval (crowd: 2,021)
Saturday 5 April (4:40 pm)	Woodville-West Torrens 14.8 (92)	def.	Norwood 12.14 (86)	Maughan Thiem Kia Oval (crowd: 2,181)
Saturday 5 April (4:40 pm)	Glenelg 11.11 (77)	def.	Central District 6.11 (47)	Stratarama Stadium (crowd: 3,155)

=== Round 3 ===
	Round 3
Thursday 17 April (7:40 pm)	Norwood 6.4 (40)	def. by	Sturt 12.9 (81)	Coopers Stadium (crowd: 3,562)
Friday 18 April (2:10 pm)	West Adelaide 9.9 (63)	def. by	Woodville-West Torrens 14.17 (101)	Hisense Stadium (crowd: 2,042)
Friday 18 April (2:30 pm)	North Adelaide 11.5 (71)	def. by	Central District 23.9 (147)	Prospect Oval (crowd: 4,047)
Friday 18 April (4:10 pm)	Glenelg 14.10 (94)	def. by	Adelaide 14.14 (98)	Stratarama Stadium (crowd: 5,231)
Friday 18 April (7:10 pm)	Port Adelaide 16.8 (104)	def.	South Adelaide 12.11 (83)	Alberton Oval

=== Round 4 ===
	Round 4
Friday 25 April (1:40 pm)	Central District 17.8 (110)	def.	Port Adelaide 10.4 (64)	X Convenience Oval (crowd: 2,565)
Friday 25 April (2:10 pm)	Glenelg 18.11 (119)	def.	Norwood 11.10 (76)	Stratarama Stadium (crowd: 6,042)
Saturday 26 April (2:10 pm)	South Adelaide 9.12 (66)	def. by	North Adelaide 10.13 (73)	Magain Stadium (crowd: 1,077)
Sunday 27 April (2:10 pm)	Sturt 17.15 (117)	def.	West Adelaide 5.11 (41)	Thomas Farms Oval (crowd: 3,070)
Sunday 27 April (2:10 pm)	Woodville-West Torrens 14.6 (90)	def.	Adelaide 9.15 (69)	Maughan Thiem Kia Oval (crowd: 1,332)

=== Round 5 ===
	Round 5
Saturday 3 May (12:10 pm)	Woodville-West Torrens 12.5 (77)	def.	Port Adelaide 7.10 (52)	Maughan Thiem Kia Oval (crowd: 960)
Saturday 3 May (2:10 pm)	Central District 13.10 (88)	def.	South Adelaide 5.4 (34)	X Convenience Oval (crowd: 1,269)
Sunday 4 May (2:10 pm)	Sturt 10.13 (73)	def.	Glenelg 9.11 (65)	Thomas Farms Oval (crowd: 3,590)
Sunday 4 May (2:10 pm)	North Adelaide 7.16 (58)	def. by	West Adelaide 10.11 (71)	Prospect Oval (crowd: 1,633)
Sunday 4 May (2:10 pm)	Norwood 8.20 (68)	def. by	Adelaide 14.5 (89)	Centenary Oval (crowd: 1,815)

=== Round 6 ===
	Round 6
Saturday 10 May (2:30 pm)	West Adelaide 9.7 (61)	def. by	Central District 18.9 (117)	Hisense Stadium (crowd: 1,422)
Saturday 10 May (3:10 pm)	Port Adelaide 5.13 (43)	def. by	Adelaide 13.10 (88)	Adelaide Oval
Sunday 11 May (2:10 pm)	South Adelaide 7.9 (51)	def. by	Norwood 12.9 (81)	Magain Stadium (crowd: 1,009)
Sunday 11 May (2:30 pm)	Glenelg 9.12 (66)	def.	Woodville-West Torrens 9.8 (62)	Stratarama Stadium (crowd: 2,910)
Sunday 11 May (2:30 pm)	North Adelaide 11.8 (74)	def. by	Sturt 14.13 (97)	Prospect Oval (crowd: 2,315)

=== Round 7 ===
	Round 7
Friday 23 May (7:40 pm)	Norwood 10.13 (73)	def. by	Central District 13.6 (84)	Coopers Stadium (crowd: 2,209)
Saturday 24 May (2:10 pm)	Port Adelaide 11.6 (72)	def.	North Adelaide 10.10 (70)	Alberton Oval (crowd: 1,227)
Saturday 24 May (2:10 pm)	Glenelg 21.16 (142)	def.	West Adelaide 7.13 (55)	Stratarama Stadium (crowd: 2,331)
Saturday 24 May (2:10 pm)	Sturt 15.8 (98)	def.	Adelaide 12.3 (75)	Thomas Farms Oval (crowd: 2,984)
Saturday 24 May (2:30 pm)	Woodville-West Torrens 14.10 (94)	def.	South Adelaide 9.5 (59)	Maughan Thiem Kia Oval (crowd: 1,421)

=== Round 8 ===
	Round 8
Saturday 31 May (1:10 pm)	West Adelaide 3.7 (25)	def. by	Norwood 19.15 (129)	Hisense Stadium (crowd: 1,167)
Saturday 31 May (2:10 pm)	Central District 4.6 (30)	def. by	Sturt 9.14 (68)	X Convenience Oval (crowd: 2,355)
Saturday 31 May (2:30 pm)	North Adelaide 16.11 (107)	def.	Woodville-West Torrens 11.7 (73)	Prospect Oval (crowd: 2,001)
Saturday 31 May (2:30 pm)	South Adelaide 7.9 (51)	def. by	Glenelg 19.5 (119)	Magain Stadium (crowd: 1,672)
	Bye; Adelaide, Port Adelaide

=== Round 9 ===
	Round 9
Saturday 7 June (2:10 pm)	Woodville-West Torrens 10.9 (69)	def.	Central District 4.7 (31)	Maughan Thiem Kia Oval (crowd: 1,064)
Saturday 7 June (2:30 pm)	South Adelaide 7.8 (50)	def. by	Adelaide 7.9 (51)	Magain Stadium (crowd: 978)
Sunday 8 June (1:10 pm)	Port Adelaide 19.6 (120)	def.	West Adelaide 9.3 (57)	Alberton Oval (crowd: 1,446)
Sunday 8 June (2:10 pm)	Glenelg 23.8 (146)	def.	North Adelaide 9.11 (65)	Stratarama Stadium (crowd: 3,022)
Monday 9 June (2:30 pm)	Sturt 11.10 (76)	def.	Norwood 10.12 (72)	Thomas Farms Oval (crowd: 4,571)

=== Round 10 ===
	Round 10
Saturday 14 June (1:10 pm)	Central District 4.9 (33)	def. by	Adelaide 11.12 (78)	X Convenience Oval (crowd: 1,192)
Saturday 14 June (2:10 pm)	Port Adelaide 10.14 (74)	def.	Woodville-West Torrens 8.11 (59)	Alberton Oval (crowd: 800)
Saturday 21 June (1:10 pm)	West Adelaide 11.8 (74)	def. by	North Adelaide 12.6 (78)	Hisense Stadium (crowd: 1,005)
Sunday 22 June (2:10 pm)	Glenelg 9.13 (67)	def. by	Sturt 13.9 (87)	Stratarama Stadium (crowd: 5,148)
Sunday 22 June (2:30 pm)	Norwood 12.12 (84)	def.	South Adelaide 4.8 (32)	Coopers Stadium (crowd: 1,466)

=== Round 11 ===
	Round 11
Saturday 28 June (1:10 pm)	South Adelaide 9.11 (65)	def.	Port Adelaide 8.10 (58)	Magain Stadium (crowd: 956)
Saturday 28 June (2:10 pm)	North Adelaide 10.4 (64)	def. by	Adelaide 23.10 (148)	Prospect Oval (crowd: 1,675)
Saturday 28 June (2:10 pm)	Norwood 9.5 (59)	def. by	Glenelg 11.9 (75)	Coopers Stadium (crowd: 1,795)
Saturday 28 June (2:30 pm)	Central District 15.11 (101)	def.	West Adelaide 8.8 (56)	X Convenience Oval (crowd: 1,425)
Saturday 28 June (2:30 pm)	Sturt 24.19 (159)	def.	Woodville-West Torrens 4.11 (35)	Thomas Farms Oval (crowd: 2,394)

=== Round 12 ===
	Round 12
Saturday 5 July (1:10 pm)	West Adelaide 8.6 (54)	def. by	Glenelg 15.14 (104)	Hisense Stadium (crowd: 1,386)
Saturday 5 July (2:10 pm)	Sturt 25.13 (163)	def.	North Adelaide 7.6 (48)	Thomas Farms Oval (crowd: 2,234)
Saturday 5 July (2:30 pm)	South Adelaide 9.11 (65)	def. by	Central District 14.9 (93)	Magain Stadium (crowd: 1,135)
Sunday 6 July (11:15 am)	Woodville-West Torrens 7.7 (49)	def. by	Adelaide 22.17 (149)	Adelaide Oval
Sunday 6 July (1:10 pm)	Port Adelaide 12.4 (76)	def. by	Norwood 15.3 (93)	Alberton Oval (crowd: 1,476)

=== Round 13 ===
	Round 13
Saturday 12 July (1:10 pm)	Glenelg 17.9 (111)	def.	Adelaide 13.5 (83)	Stratarama Stadium (crowd: 1,386)
Saturday 12 July (2:10 pm)	Central District 13.6 (84)	def.	Norwood 9.11 (65)	X Convenience Oval (crowd: 1,723)
Saturday 12 July (2:10 pm)	Woodville-West Torrens 7.14 (56)	def. by	West Adelaide 10.9 (69)	Maughan Thiem Kia Oval (crowd: 1,259)
Saturday 12 July (2:10 pm)	Port Adelaide 10.9 (69)	def. by	Sturt 22.11 (143)	Alberton Oval (crowd: 1,830)
Saturday 12 July (2:30 pm)	North Adelaide 11.11 (77)	def. by	South Adelaide 16.11 (107)	Port Pirie Memorial Oval (crowd: 2,492)

=== Round 14 ===
	Round 14
Saturday 19 July (2:10 pm)	Norwood 24.14 (158)	def.	Woodville-West Torrens 3.9 (27)	Coopers Stadium (crowd: 1,479)
Saturday 19 July (2:10 pm)	Sturt 17.14 (116)	def.	Central District 9.11 (65)	Thomas Farms Oval (crowd: 2,410)
Saturday 19 July (2:10 pm)	Glenelg 17.7 (109)	def.	South Adelaide 15.5 (95)	Stratarama Stadium (crowd: 2,291)
Saturday 19 July (2:30 pm)	West Adelaide 12.7 (79)	def. by	Adelaide 21.14 (140)	Hisense Stadium (crowd: 822)
Sunday 20 July (1:10 pm)	North Adelaide 10.8 (68)	def. by	Port Adelaide 15.10 (100)	Prospect Oval (crowd: 2,263)

=== Round 15 ===
	Round 15
Saturday 26 July (4:10 pm)	Adelaide 12.22 (94)	def.	Port Adelaide 12.7 (79)	Adelaide Oval
	Bye; Central District, Glenelg, North Adelaide, Norwood, South Adelaide, Sturt, West Adelaide, Woodville-West Torrens

=== Round 16 ===
	Round 16
Saturday 2 August (1:10 pm)	Norwood 8.15 (63)	def. by	Adelaide 12.11 (83)	Coopers Stadium (crowd: 1,362)
Saturday 2 August (2:10 pm)	Central District 13.11 (89)	def.	North Adelaide 6.8 (44)	X Convenience Oval (crowd: 1,705)
Saturday 2 August (2:10 pm)	West Adelaide 9.14 (68)	def. by	Port Adelaide 14.8 (92)	Hisense Stadium (crowd: 879)
Saturday 2 August (2:10 pm)	Sturt 14.10 (94)	def.	South Adelaide 11.9 (75)	Thomas Farms Oval (crowd: 2,597)
Sunday 3 August (2:10 pm)	Woodville-West Torrens 9.4 (58)	def. by	Glenelg 19.11 (125)	Maughan Thiem Kia Oval (crowd: 1,567)

=== Round 17 ===
	Round 17
Saturday 9 August (2:10 pm)	North Adelaide 11.8 (74)	def. by	Glenelg 11.13 (79)	Prospect Oval (crowd: 1,707)
Saturday 9 August (2:10 pm)	Norwood 12.14 (86)	def.	West Adelaide 13.7 (85)	Coopers Stadium (crowd: 1,498)
Saturday 9 August (2:10 pm)	Woodville-West Torrens 8.7 (55)	def. by	Sturt 19.22 (136)	Maughan Thiem Kia Oval (crowd: 1,530)
Saturday 9 August (2:10 pm)	South Adelaide 8.8 (56)	def. by	Adelaide 12.11 (83)	Magain Stadium (crowd: 990)
Sunday 10 August (2:10 pm)	Port Adelaide 14.10 (94)	def.	Central District 12.8 (80)	Alberton Oval (crowd: 1,635)

=== Round 18 ===
	Round 18
Saturday 16 August (2:10 pm)	North Adelaide 9.9 (63)	def. by	Norwood 11.10 (76)	Prospect Oval (crowd: 2,105)
Saturday 16 August (2:10 pm)	Glenelg 13.16 (94)	def.	Port Adelaide 12.12 (84)	Stratarama Stadium (crowd: 2,685)
Saturday 16 August (2:10 pm)	West Adelaide 8.8 (56)	def. by	Sturt 22.9 (141)	Hisense Stadium (crowd: 1,393)
Saturday 16 August (2:10 pm)	South Adelaide 14.10 (94)	def.	Woodville-West Torrens 6.12 (48)	Magain Stadium (crowd: 757)
Saturday 16 August (2:30 pm)	Central District 9.7 (61)	def.	Adelaide 9.6 (60)	X Convenience Oval (crowd: 982)

=== Round 19 ===
	Round 19
Saturday 23 August (2:10 pm)	West Adelaide 7.14 (56)	def.	South Adelaide 7.8 (50)	Hisense Stadium (crowd: 1,284)
Saturday 23 August (2:10 pm)	Central District 6.6 (42)	def. by	Glenelg 20.8 (128)	X Convenience Oval (crowd: 1,790)
Saturday 23 August (2:10 pm)	Sturt 13.9 (87)	def. by	Adelaide 14.5 (89)	Thomas Farms Oval (crowd: 5,595)
Saturday 23 August (3:40 pm)	Norwood 12.15 (87)	def.	Port Adelaide 11.11 (77)	Coopers Stadium (crowd: 3,387)
Sunday 24 August (2:10 pm)	Woodville-West Torrens 10.6 (66)	def.	North Adelaide 9.9 (63)	Maughan Thiem Kia Oval (crowd: 1,509)

== Ladder ==
Pos	Team	Pld	W	L	D	PF	PA	PP	Pts	Qualification
1	Sturt	18	17	1	0	1924	1089	63.86	34	Finals series
2	Glenelg	18	15	3	0	1818	1197	60.30	30	Finals series
3	Adelaide (R)	18	14	4	0	1717	1241	58.05	28	Finals series
4	Central District	18	11	7	0	1368	1288	51.51	22	Finals series
5	Norwood	18	8	10	0	1431	1286	52.67	16	Finals series
6	Port Adelaide (R)	18	7	11	0	1370	1541	47.06	14	
7	Woodville-West Torrens	18	7	11	0	1176	1626	41.97	14	
8	South Adelaide	18	4	14	0	1154	1455	44.23	8	
9	North Adelaide	18	4	14	0	1249	1723	42.03	8	
10	West Adelaide	18	3	15	0	1063	1824	36.82	6	

Updated to match(es) played on 3 August 2025. Source: sanfl.com.au
Rules for classification: 1) points; 2) percentage; 3) number of points for.

(R) = Reserves for AFL Seniors

== Finals series ==
=== Week one – Qualifying and elimination finals ===
	Elimination final
Sunday 31 August (12:15 pm)	Central District 8.9 (57)	def. by	Norwood 11.9 (75)	Adelaide Oval (crowd: 7,782)	Report

	Qualifying final
Sunday 31 August (3:15 pm)	Glenelg 10.14 (74)	def.	Adelaide 11.7 (73)	Adelaide Oval (crowd: 7,782)	Report

=== Week two – Semi-finals ===
	First Semi-final
Sunday 7 September (12:15 pm)	Adelaide 10.10 (70)	def. by	Norwood 15.14 (104)	Adelaide Oval (crowd: 11,072)	Report

	Second Semi-final
Sunday 7 September (3:15 pm)	Sturt 15.12 (102)	def.	Glenelg 8.12 (60)	Adelaide Oval (crowd: 11,072)	Report

=== Week three – Preliminary final ===
	Preliminary final
Sunday 14 September (3:15 pm)	Glenelg 8.9 (57)	def.	Norwood 7.13 (55)	Adelaide Oval (crowd: 10,957)	Report

=== Week four – Grand Final ===
2025 SANFL Grand Final
Sunday 21 September (2:30 pm)	Sturt	def.	Glenelg	Adelaide Oval (crowd: 34,426)
3.4 (22); 6.6 (42); 13.7 (85); 16.9 (105)	Q1; Q2; Q3; Final	1.2 (8); 2.4 (16); 6.5 (41); 11.8 (74)	Jack Oatey Medal: Angus Anderson (Sturt); Television broadcast: Seven Network
Hone 4, Conforti 2, Mathews 2, McFadyen 2, Anderson, Emmett, Fahey-Sparks, Holt, Snelling, Voss	Goals	Hosie 5, Allen, Bailey, Finlay, Gerloff, McBean, Reynolds

== Representative matches ==
Two interstate representative matches were arranged by the league. A match between the SANFL and VFL in Tanunda in the Barossa Valley region was scheduled during the AFL's Gather Round fixtures in South Australia. The SANFL and WAFL are also scheduled to compete in the state team's 100th match the following month in Adelaide.

=== SANFL vs VFL ===
2025 AAMI State Game
Saturday, 12 April (14:45 ACST)	SANFL	def. by	VFL	Tanunda Recreation Park
2.7 (19); 7.8 (50); 11.10 (76); 15.13 (103)	Q1; Q2; Q3; Final	4.0 (24); 8.2 (50); 12.6 (78); 18.6 (114)	Umpires: Sam Morgan, Mitch Scott, Joel Clamp; Fos Williams Medal (SANFL) & Frank Johnson Medal (VFL): Corey Lyons (SANFL), Louis Pinnuck (VFL); Television broadcast: Seven Network
McBean 5, Hosie 5, Hayes, Bell, Rowe, Mackinlay, Grace	Goals	McLaughlin 4, Heron 2, Woodcock 2, Lake 2, Pinnuck 2, Ellison, Tsitas, McMahon, Murphy, Harvey Hooper, Bytel
Wigg, McBean, Bell, Hosie, Lyons, Lewis	Best	Woodcock, Heron, Brew, Pinnuck, Hooper, Lake
Corey Lyons won the Fos Williams Medal as the best on ground SANFL player.; Louis Pinnuck won the Frank Johnson Medal as the best on ground VFL player.

=== SANFL vs WAFL ===
2025 Kia State Game
Saturday, 17 May (11:30 ACST)	SANFL	def. by	WAFL	Adelaide Oval
2.3 (15); 4.5 (29); 5.6 (36); 8.8 (56)	Q1; Q2; Q3; Final	2.1 (13); 5.2 (32); 10.6 (66); 13.8 (86)	Fos Williams Medal (SANFL) & Simpson Medal (WAFL): Mani Liddy (SANFL), Milan Murdock (WAFL)
Hosie 4, McBean 2, Rowe, Allen	Goals	Borchet 4, May 2, Schofield 2, Clarke, Davis, Hinder, Jones, Sears
Liddy, Hosie, Allen, Hilder, Lukac	Best	Murdock, Borchet, Sellwood, Turner, Ameduri, Eardley, Hinder, May
This was the 100th state game between the two states.; Match was played as a curtain raiser for the Port Adelaide vs Geelong Round 10 AFL match.; SANFL Fos Williams Medallist Mani Liddy was selected by Port Adelaide AFL with pick 16 of the 2025 mid-season rookie draft on 28 May 2025. He made his debut in round 14 of the 2025 AFL season.

== See also ==
- 2025 SANFL Women's League season
