= Eddie Sansbury =

Australian rules footballer (born 1983)

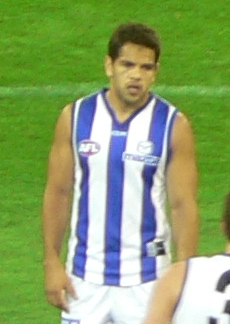

Personal information
- Born: 26 November 1983 (age 42)
- Original team: Central District (SANFL)
- Draft: No. 40, 2003 AFL draft, Kangaroos
- Debut: Round 1, 2004, Kangaroos vs. Adelaide, at MCG
- Height: 183 cm (6 ft 0 in)
- Weight: 86 kg (190 lb)
- Position: Forward

Playing career^{1}
Years	Club	Games (Goals)
2004–2008	North Melbourne	40 (21)

Representative team honours
Years	Team	Games (Goals)
2005	Indigenous All-Stars	1 (1)
- ^{1} Playing statistics correct to the end of 2008.

Career highlights
- 3× SANFL premiership player (2003, 2009, 2010); NEAFL premiership player (2014); NTFL premiership player (2014–15); Norm Russell Medal winner (2011)

Edward (Eddie) Sansbury (born 26 November 1983) is an Australian rules football player who formerly played as a midfielder for the North Melbourne Football Club in the Australian Football League.

A junior footballer at Arthurton and Stansbury on the Yorke Peninsula, Sansbury was drafted to the Kangaroos as a third round selection at pick 40 in the 2003 AFL draft from the Central District Bulldogs in the South Australian National Football League (SANFL). In the 2003 SANFL Grand Final he kicked five goals against the future Brownlow Medalist Adam Cooney.

Sansbury played mostly as a midfielder or forward during his career. In round 22 of the 2007 AFL season, Sansbury kicked five goals in the Kangaroos' 64-point win over the Western Bulldogs. He had his best season in Kangaroo colours to date.

In 2008, Sansbury was limited to just one appearance with North Melbourne and was delisted. He was a member of the North Ballarat 2008 VFL premiership team with that club being the Kangaroos' reserves affiliate at the time.

From 2009 to 2012, he returned to the SANFL to play with former club Central District, winning the club's Norm Russell Medal at their best and fairest in 2011. While with the club, Central Districts won the 2009 and 2010 premierships. He would later play in the North East Australian Football League (NEAFL) with the Aspley Football Club from 2013 through 2016, also playing in the Northern Territory Football League with Wanderers and Palmerston. He was a member of Wanderers' 2014–15 premiership team, also winning the 2014 NEAFL premiership with Aspley, kicking a goal in the Grand Final against the Sydney Swans.

In 2016, Sansbury was appointed as an indigenous liaison officer at the Gold Coast after working at AFL Queensland. He would later line up for the club's reserves team in the NEAFL for three matches during the 2018 season. Sansbury left his role at the club during the 2018 AFL season.

Sansbury is the cousin of former Sydney player Michael O'Loughlin and Kangaroos teammate Daniel Wells.

He is the biological father of current St Kilda player Nasiah Wanganeen-Milera.

== Statistics ==
Legend
G	Goals	K	Kicks	D	Disposals	T	Tackles
B	Behinds	H	Handballs	M	Marks

Season	Team	No.	Games	Totals							Averages (per game)						
Season	Team	No.	Games	G	B	K	H	D	M	T	G	B	K	H	D	M	T
2004	Kangaroos	32	10	1	2	62	31	93	22	11	0.1	0.2	6.2	3.1	9.3	2.2	1.1
2005	Kangaroos	32	10	5	5	49	38	87	24	20	0.5	0.5	4.9	3.8	8.7	2.4	2.0
2006	Kangaroos	32	7	1	1	47	52	99	30	14	0.1	0.1	6.7	7.4	14.1	4.3	2.0
2007	Kangaroos	32	12	14	8	100	81	181	38	30	1.2	0.7	8.3	6.8	15.1	3.2	2.5
2008	North Melbourne	32	1	0	0	1	3	4	1	2	0	0	1.0	3.0	4.0	1.0	2.0
Career			40	21	16	259	205	464	118	77	0.5	0.4	6.5	5.1	11.6	2.9	1.9
