= Craig Parry (disambiguation) =

Craig Parry is a golfer.

Craig Parry may also refer to:

- Craig Parry (footballer) (born 1983), Australian rules footballer
- Craig Parry, see List of World Rally Championship co-drivers
