= 2023 SANFL season =

144th season of the South Australian National Football League

- Teams: 10
- Premiers: Glenelg; 6th premiership
- Minor premiers: Glenelg; 8th minor premiership
- Magarey Medallist: Harry Grant (Central District – 27 votes)
- Ken Farmer Medallist: Lachlan Hosie (Glenelg – 52 goals)

Attendance
- Total attendance: 172,162

The 2023 South Australian National Football League season (officially the SANFL Hostplus League) was the 144th season of the South Australian National Football League (SANFL), the highest-level Australian rules football competition in South Australia. The season commenced on 31 March and concluded with the Grand Final on 24 September.

== Premiership Season ==
=== Round 1 ===
	Round 1
Friday 31 March (7:40 pm)	Norwood 6.9 (45)	def. by	Woodville-West Torrens 14.7 (91)	Coopers Stadium
Saturday 1 April (2:10 pm)	North Adelaide 10.19 (79)	def.	West Adelaide 9.9 (63)	Prospect Oval
Saturday 1 April (2:10 pm)	South Adelaide 10.12 (72)	def.	Central District 7.4 (46)	Flinders University Stadium
Saturday 1 April (2:10 pm)	Sturt 12.8 (80)	def.	Glenelg 7.7 (49)	Wigan Oval
Saturday 1 April (3:10 pm)	Port Adelaide 6.10 (46)	def. by	Adelaide 19.10 (124)	Adelaide Oval

=== Round 2 ===
	Round 2 (Easter Weekend)
Thursday 6 April (7:40 pm)	Norwood 8.5 (53)	def. by	Sturt 16.10 (106)	Coopers Stadium
Friday 7 April (2:10 pm)	South Adelaide 9.2 (56)	def.	Woodville-West Torrens 6.9 (45)	Flinders University Stadium
Friday 7 April (2:10 pm)	Central District 9.13 (67)	def.	North Adelaide 5.10 (40)	X Convenience Oval
Friday 7 April (2:10 pm)	West Adelaide 9.6 (60)	def. by	Adelaide 13.15 (93)	Hisense Stadium
Friday 7 April (4:40 pm)	Glenelg 10.10 (70)	def.	Port Adelaide 7.11 (53)	Stratarama Stadium

=== Round 3 ===
	Round 3 (ANZAC Round)
Saturday 22 April (1:10 pm)	Central District 13.7 (85)	def.	Adelaide 11.15 (81)	X Convenience Oval
Sunday 23 April (2:10 pm)	Sturt 16.12 (108)	def.	Port Adelaide 10.10 (70)	Wigan Oval
Sunday 23 April (2:10 pm)	West Adelaide 14.12 (96)	def.	South Adelaide 11.8 (74)	Hisense Stadium
Monday 24 April (7:40 pm)	Glenelg 15.10 (100)	def.	Woodville-West Torrens 7.10 (52)	Stratarama Stadium
Tuesday 25 April (2:10 pm)	Norwood 5.10 (40)	def. by	North Adelaide 14.10 (94)	Coopers Stadium

=== Round 4 ===
	Round 4
Saturday 29 April (2:30 pm)	Sturt 9.9 (63)	def.	Central District 9.6 (60)	Wigan Oval
Sunday 30 April (12:30 pm)	South Adelaide 7.8 (50)	def. by	Adelaide 19.20 (134)	Adelaide Oval
Sunday 30 April (1:10 pm)	North Adelaide 10.10 (70)	def.	Woodville-West Torrens 7.12 (54)	Prospect Oval
Sunday 30 April (2:10 pm)	Glenelg 12.10 (82)	def.	Norwood 7.10 (52)	Stratarama Stadium
Sunday 30 April (2:10 pm)	West Adelaide 10.8 (68)	def. by	Port Adelaide 12.13 (85)	Loxton Oval, Loxton

=== Round 5 ===
	Round 5
Saturday 6 May (2:10 pm)	Central District 8.12 (60)	def.	West Adelaide 7.7 (49)	X Convenience Oval
Saturday 6 May (2:10 pm)	South Adelaide 6.9 (45)	def. by	Glenelg 13.8 (86)	Flinders University Stadium
Saturday 6 May (2:10 pm)	North Adelaide 5.11 (41)	def. by	Adelaide 13.10 (88)	Prospect Oval
Saturday 6 May (2:30 pm)	Port Adelaide 8.10 (58)	def.	Norwood 7.9 (51)	Alberton Oval
Saturday 6 May (4:40 pm)	Woodville-West Torrens 10.5 (65)	def. by	Sturt 12.15 (87)	Woodville Oval

=== Round 6 ===
	Round 6
Saturday 13 May (2:10 pm)	Norwood 8.14 (62)	def. by	West Adelaide 11.8 (74)	Centenary Oval, Port Lincoln
Saturday 13 May (2:10 pm)	Woodville-West Torrens 10.7 (67)	def.	Central District 6.7 (43)	Woodville Oval
Saturday 13 May (2:10 pm)	Glenelg 16.14 (110)	def.	North Adelaide 8.5 (53)	Stratarama Stadium
Saturday 13 May (2:30 pm)	Sturt 10.6 (66)	def.	Adelaide 8.8 (56)	Wigan Oval
Sunday 14 May (2:10 pm)	Port Adelaide 15.12 (102)	def.	South Adelaide 11.8 (74)	Alberton Oval

=== Round 7 ===
	Round 7
Friday 26 May (7:40 pm)	Norwood 5.6 (36)	def. by	Adelaide 8.12 (60)	Coopers Stadium
Saturday 27 May (2:10 pm)	West Adelaide 5.8 (38)	def. by	Woodville-West Torrens 14.10 (94)	Hisense Stadium
Saturday 27 May (2:10 pm)	Central District 6.8 (44)	def. by	Glenelg 8.5 (53)	X Convenience Oval
Saturday 27 May (2:10 pm)	North Adelaide 15.10 (100)	def.	Port Adelaide 14.8 (92)	Prospect Oval
Saturday 27 May (2:10 pm)	South Adelaide 7.7 (49)	def. by	Sturt 7.9 (51)	Flinders University Stadium

=== Round 8 ===
	Round 8
Saturday 3 June (2:10 pm)	Central District 8.8 (56)	def.	Norwood 7.9 (51)	X Convenience Oval
Saturday 3 June (2:10 pm)	Glenelg 12.10 (82)	def.	Adelaide 12.10 (80)	Stratarama Stadium
Sunday 4 June (2:10 pm)	Sturt 8.15 (63)	def.	West Adelaide 9.5 (59)	Wigan Oval
Sunday 4 June (2:10 pm)	Port Adelaide 8.11 (59)	def. by	Woodville-West Torrens 9.8 (62)	Alberton Oval
Sunday 4 June (2:10 pm)	North Adelaide 7.9 (51)	def. by	South Adelaide 11.12 (78)	Prospect Oval

=== Round 9 ===
	Round 9 (King's Birthday)
Saturday 10 June (12:35 pm)	Woodville-West Torrens 11.6 (72)	def. by	Adelaide 13.17 (95)	Adelaide Oval
Saturday 10 June (1:10 pm)	Port Adelaide 13.14 (92)	def.	Central District 10.9 (69)	Alberton Oval
Saturday 10 June (1:10 pm)	West Adelaide 10.8 (68)	def.	North Adelaide 5.9 (39)	Hisense Stadium
Monday 12 June (2:10 pm)	South Adelaide 8.8 (56)	def. by	Norwood 12.7 (79)	Flinders University Stadium
Monday 12 June (2:10 pm)	Glenelg 23.12 (150)	def.	Sturt 6.9 (45)	Stratarama Stadium

=== Round 10 ===
	Round 10
Saturday 17 June (2:10 pm)	Central District 6.7 (43)	def.	Woodville-West Torrens 4.2 (26)	X Convenience Oval
Sunday 18 June (2:10 pm)	Sturt 9.13 (67)	def.	North Adelaide 7.9 (51)	Wigan Oval
Sunday 18 June (2:10 pm)	Norwood 8.12 (60)	def.	Port Adelaide 8.5 (53)	Coopers Stadium
Saturday 24 June (2:10 pm)	West Adelaide 7.7 (49)	def. by	Glenelg 12.14 (86)	Hisense Stadium
Saturday 24 June (2:10 pm)	South Adelaide 6.5 (41)	def. by	Adelaide 11.12 (78)	Flinders University Stadium

=== Round 11 ===
	Round 11
Saturday 1 July (2:10 pm)	Port Adelaide 13.14 (92)	def.	West Adelaide 12.10 (82)	Alberton Oval
Saturday 1 July (2:10 pm)	Woodville-West Torrens 8.10 (58)	def. by	South Adelaide 11.10 (76)	Maughan Thiem Kia Oval
Sunday 2 July (2:10 pm)	Glenelg 18.12 (120)	def.	Central District 8.9 (57)	Stratarama Stadium
Sunday 2 July (2:10 pm)	Sturt 3.12 (30)	def. by	Norwood 9.5 (59)	Wigan Oval
Sunday 2 July (2:10 pm)	North Adelaide 10.6 (66)	def.	Adelaide 7.15 (57)	Prospect Oval

=== Round 12 ===
	Round 12
Saturday 8 July (12:40 pm)	Woodville-West Torrens 8.4 (52)	def. by	Port Adelaide 13.10 (88)	Maughan Thiem Kia Oval
Saturday 8 July (2:10 pm)	Norwood 7.15 (57)	def. by	Glenelg 13.9 (87)	Coopers Stadium
Saturday 8 July (2:10 pm)	South Adelaide 3.12 (30)	def. by	North Adelaide 6.9 (45)	Flinders University Stadium
Saturday 8 July (2:30 pm)	West Adelaide 4.8 (32)	def. by	Sturt 5.8 (38)	Hisense Stadium
Saturday 8 July (2:30 pm)	Central District 5.6 (36)	def. by	Adelaide 15.14 (104)	Nuriootpa Oval, Nuriootpa

=== Round 13 ===
	Round 13
Saturday 15 July (1:10 pm)	West Adelaide 12.9 (81)	def. by	Central District 13.14 (92)	Hisense Stadium
Saturday 15 July (1:10 pm)	Glenelg 11.15 (81)	def. by	Adelaide 15.11 (101)	Stratarama Stadium
Saturday 15 July (2:10 pm)	Port Adelaide 14.7 (91)	def.	North Adelaide 6.17 (53)	Alberton Oval
Saturday 15 July (2:10 pm)	Woodville-West Torrens 9.9 (63)	def.	Norwood 7.10 (52)	Maughan Thiem Kia Oval
Sunday 16 July (2:10 pm)	Sturt 17.5 (107)	def.	South Adelaide 11.7 (73)	Wigan Oval

=== Round 14 ===
	Round 14
Saturday 22 July (2:10 pm)	Glenelg 6.8 (44)	def.	West Adelaide 5.4 (34)	Stratarama Stadium
Saturday 22 July (2:10 pm)	North Adelaide 6.12 (48)	def.	Norwood 5.10 (40)	Prospect Oval
Saturday 22 July (2:10 pm)	Central District 8.10 (58)	def.	South Adelaide 4.9 (33)	X Convenience Oval
Sunday 23 July (1:10 pm)	Port Adelaide 10.13 (73)	def.	Sturt 7.12 (54)	Alberton Oval
Sunday 23 July (2:10 pm)	Woodville-West Torrens 6.6 (42)	def. by	Adelaide 17.9 (111)	Maughan Thiem Kia Oval

=== Round 15 ===
	Round 15
Saturday 29 July (2:10 pm)	Sturt 10.15 (75)	def.	Woodville-West Torrens 9.6 (60)	Wigan Oval
Saturday 29 July (3:30 pm)	Adelaide 14.8 (96)	def.	Port Adelaide 2.15 (27)	Adelaide Oval
Sunday 30 July (2:10 pm)	South Adelaide 8.11 (59)	def.	West Adelaide 6.1 (37)	Flinders University Stadium
Sunday 30 July (2:10 pm)	Norwood 9.10 (64)	def.	Central District 9.5 (59)	Coopers Stadium
Sunday 30 July (2:10 pm)	North Adelaide 6.9 (45)	def. by	Glenelg 11.9 (75)	Prospect Oval

=== Round 16 ===
	Round 16
Saturday 12 August (2:10 pm)	Norwood 12.11 (83)	def.	South Adelaide 12.9 (81)	Coopers Stadium
Saturday 12 August (2:10 pm)	Central District 9.4 (58)	def. by	Sturt 8.14 (62)	X Convenience Oval
Saturday 12 August (4:40 pm)	Port Adelaide 8.9 (57)	def. by	Glenelg 9.12 (66)	Alberton Oval
Sunday 13 August (2:10 pm)	Woodville-West Torrens 9.11 (65)	def. by	North Adelaide 12.8 (80)	Maughan Thiem Kia Oval
Sunday 13 August (2:10 pm)	West Adelaide 8.10 (58)	def. by	Adelaide 15.6 (96)	Johnstone Park, Murray Bridge

=== Round 17 ===
	Round 17
Saturday 19 August (1:10 pm)	South Adelaide 15.7 (97)	drew with	Port Adelaide 14.13 (97)	Flinders University Stadium
Saturday 19 August (2:10 pm)	North Adelaide 8.10 (58)	def. by	Central District 8.12 (60)	Prospect Oval
Saturday 19 August (2:10 pm)	Woodville-West Torrens 16.8 (104)	def.	Glenelg 12.8 (80)	Maughan Thiem Kia Oval
Saturday 19 August (2:10 pm)	West Adelaide 10.16 (76)	drew with	North Adelaide 11.10 (76)	Hisense Stadium
Saturday 19 August (2:10 pm)	Sturt 13.9 (87)	def. by	Adelaide 16.7 (103)	Wigan Oval

=== Round 18 ===
	Round 18
Saturday 26 August (2:10 pm)	Woodville-West Torrens 12.8 (80)	def. by	West Adelaide 13.8 (86)	Maughan Thiem Kia Oval
Saturday 26 August (2:10 pm)	Central District 14.7 (91)	def.	Port Adelaide 11.10 (76)	X Convenience Oval
Saturday 26 August (2:10 pm)	Glenelg 14.16 (100)	def.	South Adelaide 5.10 (40)	Stratarama Stadium
Saturday 26 August (2:10 pm)	North Adelaide 11.7 (73)	def. by	Sturt 15.10 (100)	Prospect Oval
Saturday 26 August (2:10 pm)	Norwood 15.3 (93)	def.	Adelaide 10.14 (74)	Coopers Stadium

== Ladder ==
Pos	Team	Pld	W	L	D	PF	PA	PP	Pts	Qualification
1	Glenelg (P)	18	15	3	0	1523	1048	59.24	30	Finals series
2	Sturt	18	14	4	0	1289	1193	51.93	28	Finals series
3	Adelaide	18	13	5	0	1627	1069	60.35	26	Finals series
4	Central District	18	9	9	0	1084	1192	47.63	18	Finals series
5	Port Adelaide	18	8	9	1	1311	1373	48.85	17	Finals series
6	North Adelaide	18	8	10	0	1086	1245	46.59	16	
7	Norwood	18	6	11	1	1053	1248	45.76	13	
8	Woodville-West Torrens	18	6	12	0	1152	1286	47.25	12	
9	South Adelaide	18	5	12	1	1084	1353	44.48	11	
10	West Adelaide	18	4	13	1	1110	1312	45.83	9	

Source: SANFL
Rules for classification: 1) points; 2) percentage; 3) number of points for.
(P) Premiers

== Finals series ==
=== Week one – Qualifying and elimination finals ===
	Elimination final
Sunday, 3 September (12:15 pm)	Central District 12.10 (82)	def.	Port Adelaide 11.9 (75)	Adelaide Oval	Report

	Qualifying final
Sunday, 3 September (3:15 pm)	Sturt 10.8 (68)	def. by	Adelaide 11.9 (75)	Adelaide Oval	Report

=== Week two – Semi-finals ===
	First Semi-final
Sunday, 10 September (12:15 pm)	Sturt 13.11 (89)	def.	Central District 8.9 (57)	Adelaide Oval	Report

	Second Semi-final
Sunday, 10 September (3:15 pm)	Glenelg 16.8 (104)	def.	Adelaide 11.6 (72)	Adelaide Oval	Report

=== Week three – Preliminary final ===
	Preliminary final
Sunday, 17 September (3:15 pm)	Adelaide 6.7 (43)	def. by	Sturt 8.12 (60)	Adelaide Oval	Report

=== Week four – Grand Final ===
2023 SANFL Grand Final
Sunday, 24 September (2:30 pm)	Glenelg	def.	Sturt	Adelaide Oval (crowd: 33,049)	Stats; Report
4.3 (27); 7.5 (47); 12.7 (79); 13.8 (86)	Q1; Q2; Q3; Final	0.3 (3); 2.6 (18); 6.6 (42); 8.14 (62)	Jack Oatey Medal: Lachlan Hosie (Glenelg); Television broadcast: Seven Network
Hosie 6, Reynolds 3, Lyons, Gerloff, Bell, Allen	Goals	Mathews 2, Voss, Richards, Grivell, Frederick, Coomblas, Burrows

== Notable events ==
- Norwood player Nick Lowden, who played in the club's 2022 premiership, died on 3 August 2023. A minute's silence was held before the start of every SANFL League match in Round 16.

== Awards ==
=== Club best and fairest ===
Club	Award	Player	Ref.
Adelaide	State League Club Champion	Jackson Hately	
Central District	Norm Russell Medal	Harry Grant	
Glenelg	John H. Ellers Trophy	Corey Lyons	
North Adelaide	Barrie Robran Club Champion	Campbell Combe	
Norwood	Michael Taylor Medal	Nik Rokahr	
Port Adelaide	A.R. McLean Medal	Nick Moore	
South Adelaide	Knuckey Cup	Keegan Brooksby	
Sturt	P. T. Morton Medal	James Battersby	
West Adelaide	Neil Kerley Medal	Josh Ryan	
Woodville-West Torrens	Perce Johns Medal	James Rowe	

== List changes ==
=== Retirements ===
Name	Club	Announced	Ref
Matt Rose	South Adelaide	17 August 2023	
Matthew Broadbent	South Adelaide	18 August 2023	
Bryce Gibbs	South Adelaide	23 August 2023	
Cam Craig	North Adelaide	25 August 2023	
Matthew Wright	Adelaide	19 September 2023	
Max Proud	Glenelg	24 September 2023	

=== Player movement ===
Two SANFL players were drafted to the AFL in the 2023 mid-season rookie draft.

Name	Recruited from	Drafted by
Matt Coulthard	Glenelg	Richmond
Mitch Hardie	Woodville-West Torrens	Geelong

== See also ==
- 2023 SANFL Women's League season
