= 2025 SANFL Grand Final =

Australian rules football match

| Sturt | Glenelg |
|---|---|
| 16.9 (105) | 11.8 (74) |
| | 1 | 2 | 3 | 4 |
|---|---|---|---|---|
| STU | 3.4 (22) | 6.6 (42) | 13.7 (85) | 16.9 (105) |
| GLE | 1.2 (8) | 2.4 (16) | 6.5 (41) | 11.8 (74) |
- Date: 21 September 2025, 2:30pm
- Stadium: Adelaide Oval
- Attendance: 34,426
- Umpires: Hughes, Morgan, Scott

Accolades
- Jack Oatey Medallist: Angus Anderson (Sturt)

Broadcast in Australia
- Network: Seven Network

The 2025 South Australian National Football League (SANFL) Grand Final was an Australian rules football match played at Adelaide Oval on Sunday, 21 September 2025.

== Background ==
It was the 137th SANFL grand final, staged to determine the premiers for the 2025 SANFL season. The match was contested by Sturt and Glenelg. Sturt won by 31 points to win their sixteenth premiership overall, and denied Glenelg of winning three-in-a-row.

It was the fifth meeting between Sturt and Glenelg in a Grand Final, who last met in the 2023 Grand Final. Thought Glenelg won on that day in 2023, Sturt would exact their revenge against the Tigers as they defeated Glenelg by 31 points in wintery conditions. The game concluded Sturt's most dominant season of all time, having only lost one game throughout the home-and-away season and the finals series – that being to Adelaide in round 19. No premier has been more dominant for the year since Glenelg in 1973, who also only lost one game.

The Jack Oatey Medal was awarded to Angus Anderson who kicked a goal to go along with his nine marks and 24 disposals. Magarey Medallist Tom Lewis was the premiership captain following James Battersby's departure from the club earlier in the week, and coach Martin Mattner won his third premiership as coach of Sturt following his success in 2016 and 2017.
