= Gary Window =

Australian rules footballer

Personal information
- Born: 11 January 1941 (age 85)
- Positions: Centre, centre half-forward

Playing career^{1}
Years	Club	Games (Goals)
1964–66, 1969–70	Central District	84 (74)

Representative team honours
Years	Team	Games (Goals)
	South Australia	2

Coaching career
Years	Club	Games (W–L–D)
1976–1977	Central District	43 (16–26–1)
- ^{1} Playing statistics correct to the end of 1970.

Career highlights
- Magarey Medalist: 1965; Reserves Magarey Medalist: 1963; South Australian Football Hall of Fame inductee

Gary Window (born 11 January 1941) is a former Australian rules footballer who played with Central District in the South Australian National Football League (SANFL).

Window played his football in either the centre or at centre half-forward. He was one of the early stars of the Central District Football Club, winning the Magarey Medal in 1965 to become the club's first ever recipient of the award. Window was also the first ever Central District player to be chosen to represent South Australia at interstate football. Injury and loss of form in the subsequent years restricted him to a total of 84 SANFL games. He later became a football commentator and was famous for his enthusiasm. In 2005 he was inducted into the SA Football Hall of Fame.

== Personal life ==
Window comes from a four generation list of footballers — his father Clarrie Window (Glenelg) and son Peter Window both played SANFL football. His grandson Hunter also plays at senior level for Glenelg and granddaughter Piper Window for the Port Adelaide AFLW team .
