= 1997 SANFL Grand Final =

Port Adelaide	Norwood
7.11 (53)	19.12 (126)
	1	2	3	4
PTA	1.2 (8)	3.3 (21)	4.7 (31)	7.11 (53)
NOR	3.4 (22)	6.5 (41)	13.8 (86)	19.12 (126)
- Date: Sunday, 5 October (2:10 pm)
- Stadium: Football Park
- Attendance: 44,161
- Umpires: Bettridge, Chambers, Woodcock

Broadcast in Australia
- Network: ABC TV
- Commentators: Ken Sheldon; Mark Naley (special comments); Rob Popplestone (boundary rider)

The 1997 SANFL Grand Final was an Australian rules football game contested between the Norwood Football Club and Port Adelaide Football Club at Football Park on 5 October 1997. It was the 99th annual grand final of the South Australian National Football League (SANFL), staged to determine the premiers for the 1997 SANFL season. The match, attended by 44,161 spectators, was won by Norwood by a margin of 73 points, marking the club's 27th SANFL premiership.

Joint Magarey Medal winner Brodie Atkinson was given the honour of the coin toss, which was won by Norwood's acting captain Anthony Harvey who chose to kick to the Southern End.

John Cunningham, a Norwood player who had suffered a seemingly season-ending injury earlier in the year, would go on to win the Jack Oatey Medal as the player judged best afield. “Being fortunate enough to win the Jack Oatey Medal is obviously a once in a lifetime experience,” said Cunningham. “It justified the decision to try and come back before the season finished. To achieve such a wonderful individual honour, along with being lucky enough to be selected as one of the 21 players on the day, was an amazing experience. That team will go down as one of the all-time greatest.”
