= Craig Parry (footballer) =

Australian Rules footballer (born 1983)

Personal information
- Born: 6 November 1983 (age 42); Western Australia
- Height: 194 cm (6 ft 4 in)
- Weight: 99 kg (15 st 8 lb; 218 lb)
- Position: Ruckman

Playing career
Years	Club	Games (Goals)
2001–2002	Subiaco (WAFL)	19 (14)
2003–2005	Port Adelaide (SANFL)	34 (?)
2006–2009	South Adelaide (SANFL)	80 (?)
2010–2013	Woodville-West Torrens (SANFL)	73 (?)

Career highlights
- SANFL debut with Port Adelaide in 2003; Woodville-West Torrens Premiership player 2011; SANFL Jack Oatey Medallist 2011; 2 State Games for South Australia (2012, 2013)

Craig Parry (born 11 June 1983) is an Australian Rules footballer who played for Subiaco in the West Australian Football League (WAFL) and Port Adelaide Magpies, South Adelaide and Woodville-West Torrens in the South Australian National Football League (SANFL). Parry won the SANFL premiership with Woodville-West Torrens in 2011.

== Career ==
Parry, a 6-foot-4-inch (193 cm) tall Ruckman, was recruited from Western Australia by the Port Adelaide Magpies and made his SANFL debut with the famous club in 2003. He would play in 34 games for the Magpies before signing to play with the South Adelaide Panthers. After playing another 80 SANFL games while with Souths, Parry once again moved on and was signed by the WWT Eagles for the 2010 SANFL season.

With the Eagles, Parry's career started to blossom. Already regarded as one of the better big men in the SANFL, he would be a member of the Eagles team which surprised reigning premiers Central District in the 2011 SANFL Grand Final at AAMI Stadium, the Eagles winning their third premiership with a 12.9 (81) to 11.12 (78) in front of 25,234 fans. Parry was judged the best player on the ground and was awarded the Jack Oatey Medal for his efforts.

Following the Grand Final win, Parry shelved retirement plans and committed to a further season with the Eagles. He committed to play his 4th season with the club when he also re-signed for the 2013 season.

His good form continued in 2012, despite the Eagles slow start to the season, and he was rewarded be selection for South Australia for their Interstate Game against Western Australia. After helping the Croweaters to a 15.11 (101) to 13.9 (87) win, he was again selected for SA in 2013 and was the dominant ruckman on the ground in SA's 21.14 (140) to 9.4 (58) over the NEAFL North team.
