= Alex van Wyk =

Personal information
- Full name: Alex van Wyk
- Born: 1 July 2004 (age 22)
- Original teams: Norwood (SANFL); North Adelaide (SANFL)
- Draft: No. 14, 2026 mid-season rookie draft
- Debut: Round 22, 2025, Port Adelaide vs. Sydney, at the SCG
- Height: 203 cm (6 ft 8 in)
- Position: Ruck

Club information
- Current club: Port Adelaide
- Number: 47

Playing career^{1}
Years	Club	Games (Goals)
2026–	Port Adelaide	1 (0)
- ^{1} Playing statistics correct to the end of round 22, 2026.

Alex van Wyk (born 1 July 2004) is a professional Australian rules footballer who plays for the Port Adelaide Football Club in the Australian Football League (AFL).

== Junior and SANFL career ==
Van Wyk played in the SANFL Juniors for Norwood. In 2023, he was named in the South Australia Under 18 squad to compete in the Under 18 Championships. In 2024 he was named in the SANFL state Under 20 side to take on the South Australia Under 18 team.

In addition to SANFL Juniors, van Wyk played for Norwood in the SANFL Reserves, unable to break into the senior side with Harry Boyd being the first-choice ruck. He won consecutive best and fairest awards for Norwood Reserves in 2023 and 2024. Ahead of the 2025 SANFL season, van Wyk moved from Norwood to North Adelaide in search of more senior opportunities.

== AFL career ==
Ahead of the 2026 AFL season, van Wyk trained with the Port Adelaide Football Club. He was drafted by Port Adelaide with pick 14 of the 2026 mid-season rookie draft. In round 22 of the 2026 season, after Mitch Georgiades was a late withdrawal with illness, van Wyk was selected to make his AFL debut.

== Statistics ==
Updated to the end of round 22, 2026.

Legend
G	Goals	K	Kicks	D	Disposals	T	Tackles
B	Behinds	H	Handballs	M	Marks	H/O	Hit-outs

Season	Team	No.	Games	Totals								Averages (per game)								Votes
Season	Team	No.	Games	G	B	K	H	D	M	T	H/O	G	B	K	H	D	M	T	H/O	Votes
2026	Port Adelaide	47	1	0	0	4	4	8	1	1	23	0.0	0.0	4.0	4.0	8.0	1.0	1.0	23.0	0
Career			1	0	0	4	4	8	1	1	23	0.0	0.0	4.0	4.0	8.0	1.0	1.0	23.0	0
