= 2023 SANFL Grand Final =

Australian rules football match

Glenelg	Sturt
13.8 (86)	8.14 (62)
	1	2	3	4
GLE	4.3 (27)	7.5 (47)	12.7 (79)	13.8 (86)
STU	0.3 (3)	2.6 (18)	6.6 (42)	8.14 (62)
- Date: 24 September 2023, 2:30pm
- Stadium: Adelaide Oval
- Attendance: 33,049
- Umpires: Morgan, Bowen, Scott

Accolades
- Jack Oatey Medallist: Lachlan Hosie (Glenelg)

Broadcast in Australia
- Network: Seven Network

The 2023 South Australian National Football League (SANFL) Grand Final was an Australian rules football match played at Adelaide Oval on Sunday, 24 September 2023. It was the 135th SANFL grand final, staged to determine the premiers for the 2023 SANFL season. The match was contested by Glenelg and Sturt, and the Glenelg Tigers won by 24 points to win their sixth premiership.

It was the fourth meeting between the Glenelg Tigers and the Sturt Double Blues, who last met in the 1974 Grand Final at Football Park with a victory to Sturt, but it would ultimately be the Tigers' first-ever premiership over the Double Blues and their second premiership in the last five years.

The Jack Oatey Medal was awarded to Lachlan Hosie for his incredible six-goal performance, and he was additionally awarded the Ken Farmer Medal for being the leading goalkicker in the home-and-away rounds.

== Background ==
Glenelg finished the 2023 SANFL season as the minor premiers and the winners of the Stanley H. Lewis Trophy for the first time since 2021 SANFL season.

Glenelg had the first week off the finals, as they finished as the minor premiers. Central District beat Port Adelaide in an elimination final, while Adelaide beat Sturt during the last quarter of the qualifying final.

Week 2 of the finals saw Central District defeated by Sturt in an initially very close semi-final, and they saw Glenelg play against the Adelaide side after they defeated Sturt the week before, where they defeated the Adelaide side to book themselves into a third date with the Thomas Seymour Hill Cup.

The third week of the finals was the Preliminary Final, which was a rematch between Sturt and the Adelaide side which saw a 17-point win for Sturt, who would the following week play against Glenelg in their fourth Grand Final meeting.
