= 2001 SANFL Grand Final =

Central District	Woodville-West Torrens
10.11 (71)	4.8 (32)
	1	2	3	4
CD	2.2 (14)	5.2 (32)	8.3 (51)	10.11 (71)
WWT	1.0 (6)	4.3 (27)	4.3 (27)	4.8 (32)
- Date: Sunday 7 October 2001
- Stadium: Football Park
- Attendance: 26,378
- Umpires: Williams, Ryan, Rowston

The 2001 South Australian National Football League (SANFL) Grand Final saw the Central District Bulldogs defeat the Woodville-West Torrens by 39 points to claim the club's second premiership victory.

The match was played on Sunday 7 October 2001 at Football Park in front of a crowd of 26,378.

2001 Central District Premiership Team
B:	Tyson Hay (#2)	Paul Geister (#31)	Damian Hicks (#14)
HB:	Brent Guerra (#44)	Brian Haraida (#19)	Heath Hopwood (#45)
C:	Martin McKinnon (#11)	Ricky MacGowan (#23)	Nathan Steinberner (#34)
HF:	Daniel Healy (#51)(Captain)	Sam McArdle (#12)	James Gowans (#28)
F:	Michael Stevens (#10)	Kynan Ford (#18)	Matthew Slade (#59)
Foll:	Paul Scoullar (#33)	Chris Gowans (#21)	Simon Arnott (#42)
Int:	Damien Arnold (#5)	Quinton Graham (#38)	Marco Bello (#7)
Coach:	Alastair Clarkson		

The Jack Oatey Medal for the best player on the ground was won by Central's Rick MacGowan.
