= 1981 SANFL Grand Final =

- Official program cover.

Port Adelaide	Glenelg
14.11 (95)	6.8 (44)
	1	2	3	4
PA	6.5 (41)	8.6 (54)	12.11 (83)	14.11 (95)
GLE	1.0 (6)	2.4 (16)	2.5 (17)	6.8 (44)
- Date: Saturday, 3 October (2:10 pm)
- Stadium: Football Park
- Attendance: 52,659

Accolades
- Jack Oatey Medallist: Russell Ebert (Port Adelaide)

The 1981 SANFL Grand Final was an Australian rules football competition. Port Adelaide beat Glenelg by 95 to 44.
