= 2024 SANFL Grand Final =

Australian rules football match

Norwood	Glenelg
11.10 (76)	12.9 (81)
	1	2	3	4
NOR	2.4 (16)	7.5 (47)	9.7 (61)	11.10 (76)
GLE	2.2 (14)	4.5 (29)	7.6 (48)	12.9 (81)
- Date: 22 September 2024, 2:30pm
- Stadium: Adelaide Oval
- Attendance: 35,129
- Umpires: Morgan, Scott, Williams

Accolades
- Jack Oatey Medallist: Liam McBean (Glenelg)

Broadcast in Australia
- Network: Seven Network

The 2024 South Australian National Football League (SANFL) Grand Final was an Australian rules football match played at Adelaide Oval on Sunday, 22 September 2024.

== Background ==
It was the 136th SANFL grand final, staged to determine the premiers for the 2024 SANFL season. The match was contested by Norwood and Glenelg. Glenelg won by 5 points to go back-to-back and win their seventh premiership overall.

It was the fifth meeting between Norwood and Glenelg, who last met in the 1982 Grand Final at Football Park with a victory to Norwood, but it would ultimately be the Tigers' first-ever premiership over the Redlegs and their second premiership in as many years. For the first time since 1934 Glenelg wore its gold and black "V" jumper in a Grand Final.

The Jack Oatey Medal was awarded to Liam McBean for his match-winning seven-goal performance.
