= 2007 SANFL Grand Final =

Central District	North Adelaide
16.11 (107)	5.12 (42)
	1	2	3	4
CD	5.2 (32)	8.4 (52)	11.6 (72)	16.11 (107)
NA	2.3 (15)	3.6 (24)	4.9 (33)	5.12 (42)
- Date: 7 October 2007
- Stadium: Football Park
- Attendance: 30,493
- Umpires: Doddridge, Hay, Williams

The 2007 South Australian National Football League (SANFL) Grand Final saw the Central District Bulldogs defeat North Adelaide by 65 points to claim the club's sixth premiership victory.

The match was played on Sunday 7 October 2007 at Football Park in front of a crowd of 30,493.
