= 2013 SANFL Grand Final =

Norwood	North Adelaide
10.12 (72)	4.8 (32)
	1	2	3	4
NOR	2.5 (17)	6.5 (41)	6.8 (44)	10.12 (72)
NTH	1.2 (8)	3.2 (20)	4.7 (31)	4.8 (32)
- Date: Sunday 6 October 2013
- Stadium: Football Park
- Attendance: 36,685
- Umpires: Avon, Haussen, Deboy

The 2013 South Australian National Football League (SANFL) Grand Final saw Norwood defeat North Adelaide by 40 points to claim the club's 29th premiership victory.

The match was played on Sunday 6 October 2013 at Football Park in front of a crowd of 36,685. Norwood was subsequently found to have breached salary cap rules and given financial penalties and a restriction on recruitment for the following season. The SANFL withdrew these sanctions in return for Norwoods support for an Adelaide Crows Reserves team being admitted to the SANFL in 2014.
