= 2008 SANFL Grand Final =

Central District	Glenelg
17.11 (113)	10.11 (71)
	1	2	3	4
CD	3.2 (20)	5.4 (34)	12.8 (80)	17.11 (113)
GLE	3.1 (19)	4.6 (30)	6.7 (43)	10.11 (71)
- Date: 5 October 2008
- Stadium: Football Park
- Attendance: 34,128
- Umpires: Pfeiffer, Bowen, Hay

The 2008 South Australian National Football League (SANFL) Grand Final saw the Central District Bulldogs defeat Glenelg by 42 points to claim the club's seventh premiership victory.

The match was played on Sunday 5 October 2008 at Football Park in front of a crowd of 34,128.
