= 2005 SANFL Grand Final =

Central District	Woodville-West Torrens
15.14 (104)	11.10 (76)
	1	2	3	4
CD	3.3 (21)	7.6 (48)	10.9 (69)	15.14 (104)
WWT	2.1 (13)	7.3 (45)	8.8 (56)	11.10 (76)
- Date: 2 October 2005
- Stadium: Football Park
- Attendance: 28,637
- Umpires: Fila, Hay, Williams

The 2005 South Australian National Football League (SANFL) Grand Final saw the Central District Bulldogs defeat Woodville-West Torrens by 28 points to claim the club's fifth premiership victory.

The match was played on Sunday 2 October 2005 at Football Park in front of a crowd of 28,637.
