= 2012 SANFL Grand Final =

Norwood	West Adelaide
12.7 (79)	3.12 (30)
	1	2	3	4
NOR	1.1 (7)	4.4 (28)	9.5 (59)	12.7 (79)
WA	0.3 (3)	1.4 (10)	1.6 (12)	3.12 (30)
- Date: Sunday 7 October 2012
- Stadium: Football Park
- Attendance: 29,661
- Umpires: Dey, Avon, Deboy

Ceremonies
- Pre-match entertainment: Satisfaction-The Stones Show (last band to play at West Lakes)
- Halftime show: Satisfaction-The Stones Show
- Post-match entertainment: Satisfaction-The Stones Show

The 2012 South Australian National Football League (SANFL) Grand Final saw Norwood defeat the West Adelaide by 49 points to claim the club's 28th premiership victory.

The match was played on Sunday 7 October 2012 at Football Park in front of a crowd of 29,661. It was a dour affair on a perfect day, with both sides adopting the constrictive style of football that had become popular in the AFL at that time.
