= 2009 SANFL Grand Final =

| Central District | Sturt |
|---|---|
| 13.14 (92) | 7.12 (54) |
| | 1 | 2 | 3 | 4 |
|---|---|---|---|---|
| CD | 6.3 (39) | 9.8 (62) | 12.12 (84) | 13.14 (92) |
| STU | 3.3 (21) | 3.6 (24) | 6.7 (43) | 7.12 (54) |
- Date: 4 October 2009
- Stadium: Football Park
- Attendance: 35,647
- Umpires: Bowen, Pfeiffer, Dey

The 2009 South Australian National Football League (SANFL) Grand Final saw the Central District Bulldogs defeat Sturt by 38 points to claim the club's eighth premiership victory.

The match was played on Sunday 4 October 2009 at Football Park in front of a crowd of 35,647.
