= 2011 SANFL Grand Final =

Australian sporting event

Central District	Woodville-West Torrens
11.12 (78)	12.9 (81)
	1	2	3	4
CD	1.1 (7)	4.3 (27)	7.8 (50)	11.12 (78)
WWT	4.2 (26)	7.6 (48)	11.8 (74)	12.9 (81)
- Date: Sunday 9 October 2011
- Stadium: Football Park
- Attendance: 25,234
- Umpires: Rowston, Fila, Haussen

The 2011 South Australian National Football League (SANFL) Grand Final saw Woodville-West Torrens defeat the Central District Bulldogs by 3 points to claim the club's third premiership victory.

The match was played on Sunday 9 October 2011 at Football Park in front of a crowd of 25,234.
