= 2014–15 NTFL season =

94th season of the NTFL

- Teams: 8
- Premiers: Wanderers; 12th premiership
- Minor premiers: St Marys; 31st minor premiership
- Wooden spooners: Waratah; 22nd wooden spoon

The 2014–15 NTFL season was the 94th season of the Northern Territory Football League (NTFL).

The Wanderers Eagles won their 12th premiership title, defeating St Mary's by 34 points in the grand final.

== Ladder ==
2014–15 NTFL Ladder
Pos	Team	Pld	W	L	D	PF	PA	PP	Pts
1	St Marys	18	15	2	1	1980	1082	183.0	62
2	Southern Districts	18	11	7	0	1715	1426	120.3	44
3	Nightcliff	18	11	7	0	1750	1746	100.2	44
4	Tiwi Bombers	18	9	9	0	1948	1900	102.5	36
5	Wanderers (P)	18	9	9	0	1403	1722	81.5	36
6	Palmerston	18	7	9	2	1373	1569	87.5	32
7	Darwin	18	5	12	1	1429	1702	84.0	22
8	Waratah	18	3	15	0	1152	1603	71.9	12

(P) Premiers

== Grand Final ==
2014–15 NTFL Grand Final
Saturday 14 March 2015 (6:30 pm)	St Marys	def. by	Wanderers	Marrara Stadium	Report
2.1 (13); 2.4 (16); 4.5 (29); 7.7 (49)	Q1; Q2; Q3; Final	4.1 (25); 5.6 (36); 8.8 (56); 11.17 (83)
