= 2004 SANFL Grand Final =

| Central District | Woodville-West Torrens |
|---|---|
| 23.15 (153) | 4.4 (28) |
| | 1 | 2 | 3 | 4 |
|---|---|---|---|---|
| CD | 6.1 (37) | 11.5 (71) | 18.11 (119) | 23.15 (153) |
| WWT | 2.2 (14) | 3.3 (21) | 4.3 (27) | 4.4 (28) |
- Date: 3 October 2004
- Stadium: Football Park
- Attendance: 24,207
- Umpires: Doddridge, Pfeiffer, Williams

The 2004 South Australian National Football League (SANFL) Grand Final saw the Central District Bulldogs defeat Woodville-West Torrens by 125 points to claim the club's fourth premiership victory. This is the record margin of victory in an SANFL Grand Final to date.

The match was played on Sunday 3 October 2004 at Football Park in front of a crowd of 24,207.
