= Chris Gowans =

Australian rules footballer

Personal information
- Born: 13 March 1977 (age 49)
- Original team: Werribee

Playing career^{1}
Years	Club	Games (Goals)
2000–2012	Central District	246 (332)
- ^{1} Playing statistics correct to the end of 2012.

Career highlights
- Nine-time Premiership player: 2000, 2001, 2003, 2004, 2005, 2007, 2008, 2009, 2010; Jack Oatey Medallist: 2003 & 2007; Leading CDFC League Goal kicker: 2003 (41); Bob Quinn Medalist 2007

Chris Gowans (born 13 March 1977) is a former Australian rules football player who played for Central District in the South Australian National Football League.

== Career ==
Chris Gowans was recruited from Werribee Football Club to the St Kilda Football Club of the Australian Football League with the 25th selection in the 1999 Rookie Draft. He failed to play a senior game at St Kilda, so moved to Central District along with twin brother James Gowans, both players league debuting in 2000. He is the only player to win the Jack Oatey Medal twice.

Chris, along with twin brother James, has played in an unprecedented 17 consecutive Grand Finals (1995 - 97 with Anglesea, 1998 with Werribee, 1999 with St Kilda Reserves, 2000 - 11 with Central District).
