= Lachlan Hosie =

Australian rules footballer

Personal information
- Born: 25 February 1997 (age 29); Henley Beach, South Australia
- Original team: Glenelg (SANFL)
- Draft: No. 5, 2019 AFL Midseason Rookie Draft, North Melbourne
- Debut: 5 August 2020, North Melbourne vs. Geelong, at The Gabba
- Height: 189 cm (6 ft 2 in)
- Weight: 78 kg (172 lb)
- Position: Forward

Club information
- Current club: North Melbourne
- Number: 46

Playing career^{1}
Years	Club	Games (Goals)
2019–2020	North Melbourne	5 (3)
- ^{1} Playing statistics correct to the end of round 16, 2020.

Career highlights
- SANFL premiership player: 2023, 2024; Jack Oatey Medal: 2023; 2× Ken Farmer Medal: 2023, 2025

Lachlan Hosie (born 25 February 1997) is an Australian rules footballer who played for the North Melbourne Football Club in the Australian Football League (AFL). He was recruited by the North Melbourne Football Club with the 5th draft pick in the 2019 AFL Midseason Rookie Draft.

== Early football ==
Hosie played junior football for the Henley Football Club, where he kicked a total of 77 goals in his 2014 season in the Under 18s. Hosie also played for Glenelg in the South Australian National Football League (SANFL), after missing out on selection at the 2015 AFL draft. Before his selection at the mid-season draft, Hosie was leading the goalkicking count in the 2019 SANFL season.

== AFL/later SANFL career ==
Hosie kicked 20 goals in 10 games for North Melbourne's reserves team, but he struggled to break into the team. Hosie debuted in North Melbourne's 33-point loss to Geelong in the 10th round of the 2020 AFL season. On debut, he kicked two goals in the opening quarter. He also picked up 9 disposals, 2 tackles and a mark throughout the rest of the game. Hosie was delisted by North Melbourne at the end of the 2020 AFL season after a mass delisting by North Melbourne which saw 11 players cut from the team's list. Hosie then returned to Adelaide to again play for Glenelg. He was selected to represent South Australia against Western Australia in their interstate match in 2021.

Hosie won the Ken Farmer Medal in 2023 for kicking the most goals in the SANFL for the 2023 season.

== AFL statistics ==
Statistics are correct to the end of the 2020 season

Legend
G	Goals	K	Kicks	D	Disposals	T	Tackles
B	Behinds	H	Handballs	M	Marks

Season	Team	No.	Games	Totals							Averages (per game)						
Season	Team	No.	Games	G	B	K	H	D	M	T	G	B	K	H	D	M	T
2020 (Note: The 2020 season was played with 17 home-and-away matches per team (down from 22) and 16-minute quarters with time on (down from 20-minute quarters with time on) due to the impact of the COVID-19 pandemic.)	North Melbourne	46	5	3	1	24	15	39	12	34	0.6	0.2	4.8	3.0	7.8	2.4	0.8
Career			5	3	1	24	15	39	12	34	0.6	0.2	4.8	3.0	7.8	2.4	0.8
