= James Gowans (Australian footballer) =

Australian rules footballer (born 1977)

Personal information
- Full name: James Gowans
- Born: 13 March 1977 (age 49)
- Original team: Werribee
- Height: 180 cm (5 ft 11 in)
- Weight: 80 kg (176 lb)

Playing career^{1}
Years	Club	Games (Goals)
1999	St Kilda	4 (2)
2000–12	Central District	245 (270)
- ^{1} Playing statistics correct to the end of 2012.

James Gowans (born 13 March 1977) is an Australian rules footballer who played for St Kilda in the Australian Football League (AFL).

Recruited from Werribee, Gowans only made four appearances with the St Kilda senior side, mostly as a half forward flanker.

In 2000 he joined his twin brother Chris at Central District. He has participated in all of the club's nine SANFL premierships and won the Jack Oatey Medal when they claimed their first flag in 2000. He also won a Bob Quinn Medal in 2002 and the Central District 'Best and Fairest' award the following year.
