= Liam McBean =

Australian rules footballer (born 1994)

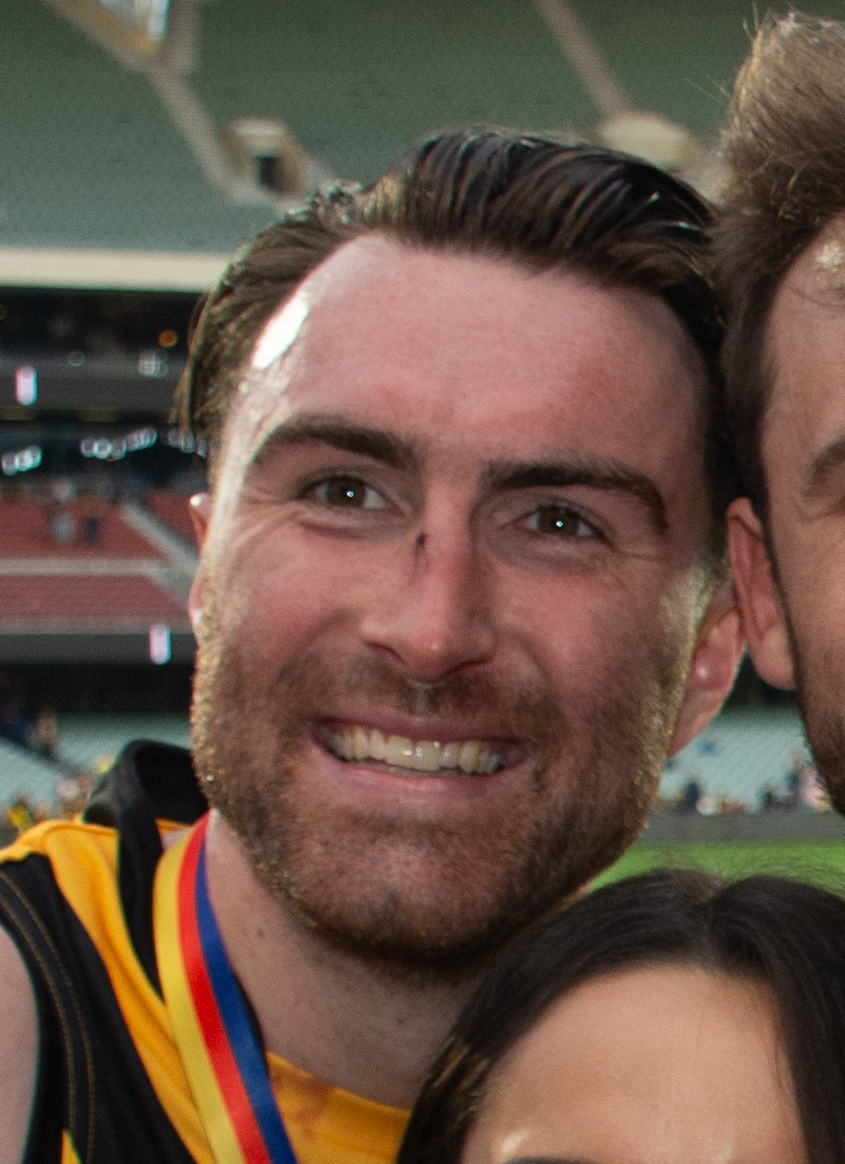
- McBean with Glenelg in September 2024

Personal information
- Full name: Liam McBean
- Born: 25 August 1994 (age 32)
- Original team: Calder Cannons (TAC Cup)
- Draft: 33rd overall 2012 AFL National Draft
- Height: 202 cm (6 ft 8 in)
- Weight: 93 kg (205 lb)
- Position: Forward/Ruck

Playing career^{1}
Years	Club	Games (Goals)
2013–2016	Richmond	5 (1)
2017–	Glenelg	150 (373)
- ^{1} Playing statistics correct to the end of round 15, 2023.

Career highlights
- VFL: Frosty Miller Medal 2015; SANFL: 3x Ken Farmer Medalist: 2019, 2020, 2021; SANFL premiership player: 2019, 2023, 2024; Jack Oatey Medal: 2024

Liam McBean (born 25 August 1994) is an Australian rules footballer who currently serves as captain of the Glenelg Football Club in the South Australian National Football League (SANFL). He previously played professionally for the Richmond Football Club in the Australian Football League (AFL).

== Footballing career ==
=== AFL career ===
McBean was drafted by Richmond with pick 33 in the 2012 National Draft from the Calder Cannons in the TAC Cup. He attended St. Bernard's College in the Melbourne suburb of Essendon. He attended the school alongside close friend and fellow 2012 draftee Joe Daniher.

After playing for Richmond's reserves team in the Victorian Football League (VFL) for the entirety of the 2013 and 2014 seasons, he made his AFL debut in round seven of the 2015 AFL season against the Collingwood Football Club.

While senior listed at Richmond in 2015, McBean was awarded the Jim 'Frosty' Miller Medal as the VFL Leading Goal Kicker in matches played for the club's reserve side. He kicked 42 goals for the season and tied with two others for the award.

At the conclusion of the 2016 season, he was delisted by Richmond.

=== SANFL career ===
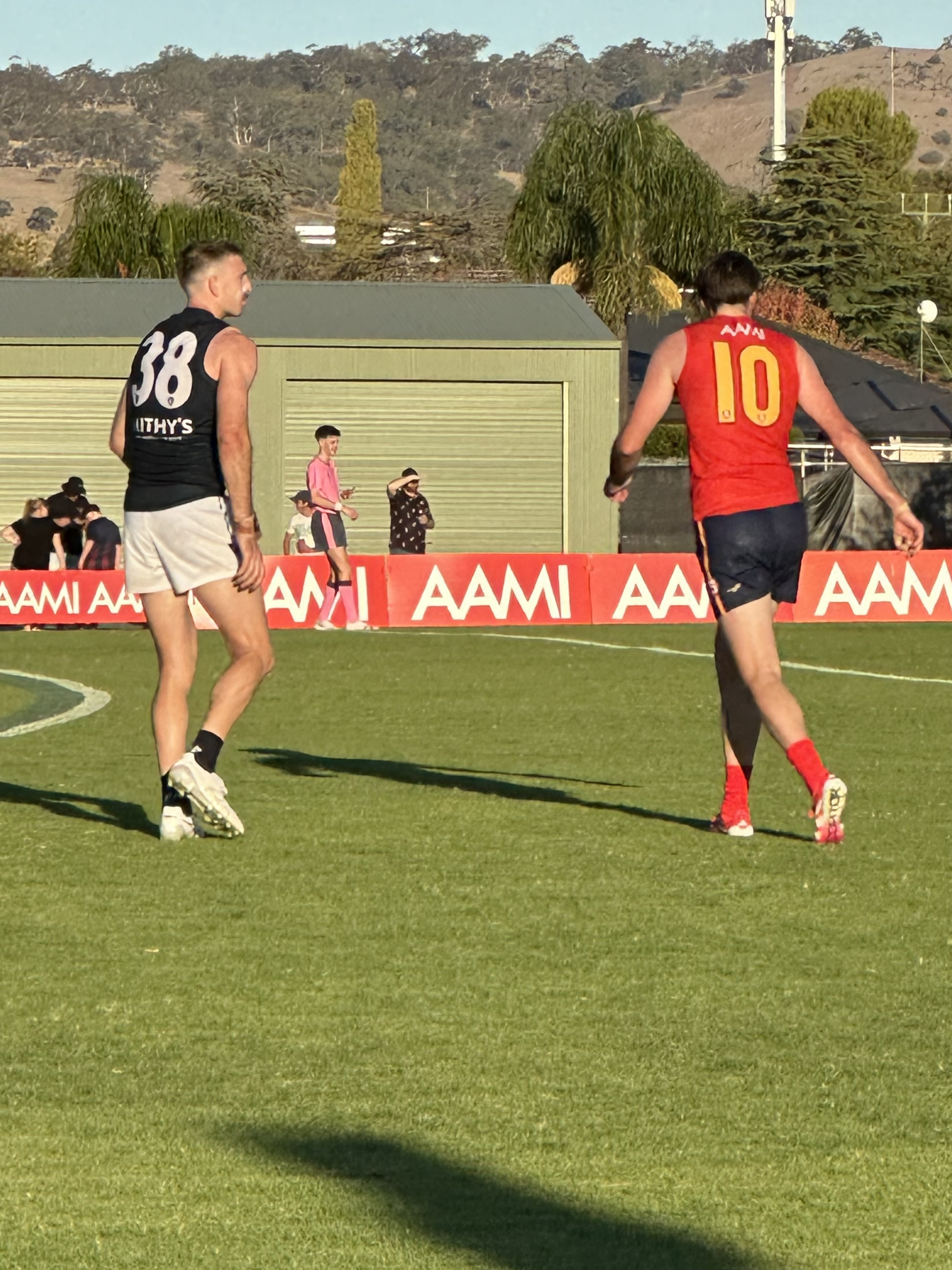
McBean and Sam Durdin in the 2025 State Game.

In 2017, McBean joined Glenelg in the SANFL. He stepped away from the club in 2018 to travel overseas. He returned to Glenelg for the 2019 season and started with a bang against the Adelaide reserves kicking a game high 9 goals.

== AFL statistics ==
Legend
G	Goals	K	Kicks	D	Disposals	T	Tackles
B	Behinds	H	Handballs	M	Marks

Season	Team	No.	Games	Totals							Averages (per game)						
Season	Team	No.	Games	G	B	K	H	D	M	T	G	B	K	H	D	M	T
2013	Richmond	34	0	—	—	—	—	—	—	—	—	—	—	—	—	—	—
2014	Richmond	34	0	—	—	—	—	—	—	—	—	—	—	—	—	—	—
2015	Richmond	34	2	0	1	9	7	16	5	2	0.0	0.5	4.5	3.5	8.0	2.5	1.0
2016	Richmond	34	3	1	3	15	10	25	12	6	0.3	1.0	5.0	3.3	8.3	4.0	2.0
Career			5	1	4	24	17	41	17	8	0.2	0.8	4.8	3.4	8.2	3.4	1.6
