= Paul Thomas (footballer) =

Australian rules footballer, born 1982

Personal information
- Born: 6 May 1982 (age 44)
- Debut: Round 4, 16 April 2005, Essendon vs. Geelong, at Telstra Dome
- Height: 179 cm (5 ft 10 in)
- Weight: 81 kg (179 lb)

Playing career^{1}
Years	Club	Games (Goals)
2001–04, 2006–2015	Central District (SANFL)	269 (67)
2002	Adelaide (AFL)	0 (0)
2005	Essendon (AFL)	8 (1)
- ^{1} Playing statistics correct to the end of 2005.

Career highlights
- SANFL debut with Central District in 2001; Central District Premiership Player 2003, 2004, 2007-10 (Captain 2007-10); SANFL Magarey Medallist 2004; Central District Best & Fairest 2004, 2009; AFL debut with Essendon on 16 April 2005 v Geelong at Telstra Dome; Central District Club Captain 2007-2015; SANFL Bob Quinn Medallist 2008; South Australian Interstate representative (SA State Captain: 2012); Central District Player Life Member 2011

Paul Thomas (born 6 May 1982) is a retired Australian rules football player who played in the South Australian National Football League (SANFL) with Central District Football Club. He has been announced as their Coach for the 2021 Season.

After spending a year on the Adelaide Crows list as a rookie in 2002, Thomas went back to the SANFL where he worked on improving his game, and he won a Magarey Medal in 2004. The Essendon Football Club picked him up in the 2004 AFL draft but was delisted at the end of the 2005 AFL season after eight games for Essendon.

Thomas returned to Central District in 2006 and was appointed club captain in 2007. He was captain of the Bulldogs winning SANFL Grand Final teams in 2007, 2008, 2009 and 2010. He won his second Norm Russell Medal as Central Districts Best & Fairest in 2009 to add to his 2004 win and in 2008 was named the Bob Quinn Medalist as for his best on ground effort in the SANFL's annual ANZAC Day match played at the Adelaide Oval between the previous season's grand finalists.

On 26 May 2012 Thomas was given the honour of captaining South Australia when they defeated Western Australia by 14 points, 15.11 (101) to 13.9 (87) at Gliderol Stadium @ Glenelg in Adelaide.

Outside league football, Thomas works at Henley High School, as a P.E. teacher and the football (AFL) Specialist Sport Program coach...

Thomas's father Jamie Thomas played 153 games for Central Districts in the 1980s.
