= Central District Football Club =

Australian rules football club in SANFL

Central District

Names
- Full name: Central District Football Club
- Nickname(s): Bulldogs, Dogs, Doggies, Centrals
- Motto: Yield to None

2025 season
- After finals: 5th
- Leading goalkicker: Aiden Grace (33 goals)
- Best and fairest: Beau Thomas

Club details
- Founded: 1959; 67 years ago (joined SANFL in 1964)
- Competition: South Australian National Football League
- President: David Cavenett
- Coach: Paul Thomas
- Captain(s): Jarrod Schiller & Kyle Presbury
- Premierships: SANFL (9); 2000, 2001, 2003, 2004, 2005, 2007, 2008, 2009, 2010 SANFLW (1); 2023
- Ground: X Convenience Oval (capacity: 16,000)

Uniforms
Home

Other information
- Official website: cdfc.com.au

Central District Football Club, nicknamed the Bulldogs, is an Australian rules football club which plays in the South Australian National Football League. Based in Elizabeth in the City of Playford, about 25 kilometres or 16 miles north of Adelaide, its home ground is X Convenience Oval, (Note: Historically called Elizabeth Oval) which is often referred to as the "Ponderosa".

Central's development zone is a single contiguous area that includes the northern Adelaide suburbs of Elizabeth, Salisbury, Smithfield, Munno Para, Golden Grove, Greenwith, the adjacent country townships of Angle Vale, Virginia, One Tree Hill, Gawler and the adjacent semi rural areas that also includes the Barossa Valley.

== Origins and background ==
Football clubs were established in the northern areas beyond metropolitan Adelaide at Salisbury (1880), Kapunda (1866) and Gawler (1868), which fielded a team for four seasons (1887–1890) in the early years of the South Australian Football Association, which became the South Austrlian Football League (SAFL) in 1907 and the South Australian National Football League (SANFL) in 1927.

After four seasons in the SAFA a senior Gawler team finished last in the 1890 SAFA season with two draws in its 14 games, and withdrew the following the season. It had formed a local junior league association in 1889 consisting of three clubs, the predecessor of the Barossa Light & Gawler Football Association. In 1899, with the introduction of compulsory electorate football districts by the SAFA the Gawler Football Association, which was assigned to the electoral district of Barossa zone, wrote to the SAFA informing them that they were interested in joining but the application was postponed due to electorate football still being newly implemented .. In December 1912, Gawler was admitted to the SAFL but withdrew before the commencement of the 1913 season.

In November 1936, a group from the Gawler Football Association met with delegates of the SANFL about a proposal to admit a team. The Barossa Light Association and the Adelaide Plains Association did not want to enter a combined team in league competition, but would not prevent the league from fixing the boundaries of the suggested football district to include them. It was suggested that Gawler substantiate its claim to be near league standard by sending a team to the association's B league for 12 months, but this was rejected by Gawler and the SANFL.

During the mid-1950s, a team from the developing City of Elizabeth (north of Adelaide, between the older townships of Salisbury and Gawler) was absent from SANFL. Fred Rogers, secretary of the Gawler Football League and involved with local junior competition, informally approached SANFL president Thomas Seymour Hill about admitting a league club from Adelaide's developing northern suburbs.

== New club ==
The Central District Football Club was formed in 1959, and served a five-year apprenticeship in the SANFL reserves competition (1959–1963) before entering the senior ranks with Woodville for the 1964 SANFL season. For the inaugural season in the reserves, Charlie Pyatt (Note: a key member of the late-1940s and early-to-mid-1950s West Torrens sides) was appointed coach. John Delo, a former West Torrens ruckman residing at Salisbury, was appointed the club's first captain.

The name "Central District" referred to a Queen's Birthday Holiday Football Carnival contested by the Gawler, Barossa, Adelaide Plains and Mid-North Football Leagues. The club name represented a district, bringing together people from the fast-growing urban northern Adelaide areas of Salisbury, Elizabeth, Gawler, Adelaide Plains, Barossa Valley and the Mid North. The new club gave the entire area a team to follow in the SANFL.

== Early years (1964–1970) ==
1961 West Adelaide premiership player and 1962 Margarey Medallist Ken Eustice was appointed Central's captain and coach for the 1964 season. Whilst waiting for his clearance from West Adelaide, Gary Window was the acting captain. Central's first season in the league ended without a victory, and they finished at the bottom of the table with an average losing margin of 64 points. (Note: Central has suffered only one wooden spoon since, in 1977) The first league victory was against Woodville, by 17 points, in the second round of the 1965 season. Central struggled for success during its early years. In their first seven seasons from 1964 to 1970, the Bulldogs failed to qualify for the finals. They played 140 matches, winning 32 (22.86 percent) and losing 108, including every match against Port Adelaide and Sturt.

== Finals disappointments (1971–1999) ==
=== First finals campaigns (1971 and 1972) ===
Under the coaching of Dennis Jones, who coached the club from 1968 to 1971, Centrals made the top four for the first time in the 1971 SANFL season. After winning three of their first 10 games, they won nine of the last 11, including a first-ever victory against Port Adelaide. The Bulldogs won their first-ever final (a semi-final) against Sturt by 27 points after trailing by five points at three-quarter time. It was Central's first-ever win against the Double Blues after 16 straight losses, ending Sturt's run of five consecutive premierships from 1966 to 1970. Before 42,909 spectators, the Bulldogs lost the preliminary final to Port Adelaide by 29 points after their scores were level at half-time. The reserves team, captain-coached by former senior player Gary Window, also had a successful season after the reserves minor premiers; (Note: 16 wins and five losses) they defeated Sturt in the second semi-final and the 1971 reserve grand final to earn the club's first trophy.

Tony Casserley was appointed captain-coach the following year for the. Centrals began the season in their best-ever form, winning 10 of their first 12 games, only losing to Port Adelaide and Sturt and finished with their best minor round to date, again making the top four with 14 wins and seven losses. The Bulldogs won the first semi-final against Norwood by 30 points, but lost the preliminary final to Port Adelaide by six points after leading by 21 at three-quarter time.

=== First minor premiership (1979) ===
After finishing with the wooden spoon in 1977, Daryl Hicks – a premiership player with Sturt from 1966 to 1969 and state player – was appointed coach in 1978 and took the Bulldogs to the minor premiership for the first time in 1979 with 15 wins, one draw and six losses. They lost the second semi final to Port Adelaide by 26 points after leading at half-time by 14 points, and lost the preliminary final against South Adelaide by 13 points after trailing by 35 points at three-quarter time. This made the 1979 Bulldogs one of a handful of teams in the SANFL to win the minor premiership and not make the grand final.

The 1980 SANFL season began with a game at home against the 1979 Premiers, Port Adelaide. In their first sixteen seasons from 1964 to 1979 Centrals had only defeated Port Adelaide five times. With the Bulldogs leading by 24 points at three-quarter time, the game ended in a draw before 15,696 spectators. (Note: a record crowd for Elizabeth Oval until 1984) The following week, Centrals trailed by 19 points at three-quarter time before defeating 1979 grand finalists South Adelaide by one point. The rest of the decade was disappointing; Centrals failed to win a finals game after qualifying for the finals series under three coaches: Hicks (1982), Kevin Neale (1984) and Neil Kerley (1988 and 1989).

In 1984, Kevin "Cowboy" Neale (Note: a 1966 St Kilda premiership player) replaced Hicks as coach. Neale coached Centrals to third place in the minor round in 1984, one win from the top with 16 wins and six losses. The Bulldogs were in first place at the end of round 17, but dropped to third after losses to Port Adelaide and Glenelg. With two rounds left, the top three teams were only separated by one win. Leading after the first quarter, the Bulldogs lost both finals (the qualifying Final to Glenelg by 48 points and the first semi-final to Norwood by 13 points) and finished fourth. Centrals failed to qualify for the finals under Neale during the next three seasons, finishing sixth in 1985 and 1986 and eighth in 1987.

In 1988, Kerley was appointed coach. The Bulldogs finished second in the minor round, with 15 wins and one draw. They lost both finals in 1988 and 1989, finishing fourth, and finished seventh in 1990. Centrals lost 12 consecutive finals games between the 1972 preliminary and the 1994 first semi-final.

=== 1994 finals and 1995-96 Minor Premierships and Grand Finals ===
Alan Stewart played two league matches for the Bulldogs and spent the rest of his playing career in the reserves, but was most valued as a coach of the youth and league teams. Succeeding Neil Kerley in 1991, Stewart took the club to the 1994 SANFL Cup grand final. In their first-ever grand final appearance, they narrowly lost to Woodville-West Torrens. After losing in extra time to Port Adelaide in the 1994 Qualifying final, Central defeated Norwood in the 1994 first semi-final by four points, breaking a string of twelve final losses for their first win in 22 years.

Centrals finished minor premiers for the second time in 1995, but lost to Port Adelaide in the second semi-final by two points after trailing by 27 at three-quarter time. They won their first-ever preliminary final the following week against Norwood by 24 points for their first league grand final, against Port Adelaide. Central captain Roger Girdham won the toss, and chose to kick into the wind. Centrals trailed by five points at half-time, but were outplayed in the second half and lost in front of 45,786 spectators. Stewart left the club immediately afterward, taking a recruitment position with Port Adelaide in time for their entry into the Australian Football League for the 1997 season.

Former Sydney Swans star Stephen Wright, brother of former player Michael Wright, became league coach in 1996. Centrals finished minor premiers for the third time, and defeated Port Adelaide for the first time in a finals match after eight consecutive losses. In their second Grand Final, they again faced Port Adelaide. Despite a 4–0 season record against Port Adelaide that made the Bulldogs the favourites for the 1996 SANFL Grand Final, they again lost to the Port Magpies before 46,120 spectators at Football Park. In 2023, this was the record crowd for an SANFL match involving Central District and was the best-attended SANFL Grand Final since the formation of the Adelaide Crows for the 1991 AFL season. (Note: The last higher SANFL attendance occurred when 50,589 saw Port Adelaide defeat Glenelg in 1990)

Wright, the 1993 and 1994 premiership coach at Clarence in Tasmania, enticed 22-year-old midfielder Danny Hulm – a member of the 1993 and 1994 Clarence premiership teams, Tasmania representative (1994–1996) and Best on Ground in the 1996 Tasmania Grand Final – to join Centrals in 1997. Hulm was Central's Best and Fairest in 1997 in his first season with the club, represented South Australia three times (1998–2000), vice-captained South Australia in 1999 and captained South Australia in 2000.

Former Centrals player and 1979 all-Australian Peter Jonas became coach in 1998; John Platten and Scott Lee were appointed co-captains. Centrals' 1998 finals campaign ended with a loss to Port Adelaide in the elimination final. Hulm was appointed captain in 1999. At the end of a 1999 season that saw the Bulldogs fall to seventh of nine teams, Central's finals record was six wins and 20 losses.

== Dynasty (2000–2011) ==
Staring with the 2000 season, Centrals built a dynasty rivalled in SANFL history only by the great Port Adelaide teams of the 1950s and 1990s and Sturt under Jack Oatey in the late 1960s. They dominated the 2000s SANFL football competition, winning nine premierships (Note: 2000–2001, 2003–2005, 2007–2010) and appearing in every grand final between 2000 and 2011, and were the wealthiest SANFL club except for Port Adelaide. Centrals played in 28 finals games between 2000 and 2011, with 25 wins – including 12 consecutive second semi-final wins – and three losses.

=== 2000 ===
For more than 100 years, Port Adelaide, Norwood, North Adelaide or Sturt appeared in every grand final. In 2000, the two newest teams (Central District and Woodville-West Torrens) played in the grand final; Centrals prevailed by 22 points (8.13 to 5.9) for their first SANFL premiership. Coach Peter Jonas joined St Kilda under Malcolm Blight, and inaugural premiership captain Daniel Hulm retired at age 25 due to a groin injury and a job in London. Hulm was killed after being hit by a train at Surbiton Station in London on 13 March 2001.

=== 2001 ===
Former North Melbourne and Melbourne Player Alastair Clarkson, age 32, was appointed senior coach and Daniel Healey was appointed captain. The Bulldogs won back-to-back flags against the Eagles, which become known as "Bark to Bark".[]

=== 2002 ===
After finishing minor premiers with an 18–2 record and winning the second semi-final by 14 points (their fourth victory of the season against Sturt), the Bulldogs lost to the Double Blues in the grand final. After losing the coin toss, having to kick into the wind in the first quarter, missing a chance for early goal, and Damian Hicks exiting with injured ribs, Centrals scored one point in the first quarter. Sturt continued to outplay the Bulldogs.

=== 2003 ===
2002 reserves premiership coach and former player Roy Laird was appointed coach after Alastair Clarkson's departure in February 2003. Scott Lee was appointed assistant and reserves coach. The Bulldogs earned their third flag in four years when they defeated West Adelaide. Centrals were the first club to win the league, reserve and under-19 titles in the same season.

=== 2004 ===
Central's fourth premiership in the 2004 grand final, against Woodville-West Torrens by 125 points, was the biggest winning margin in an SANFL finals match. Future club captain and 2021 coach Paul Thomas was the club's fifth Magarey Medallist.

=== 2005 ===
Central's fifth premiership (and third consecutive) in the 2005 grand final was their fourth against Woodville-West Torrens.

=== 2006 ===
Night matches were introduced at Elizabeth Oval. In the first league match under lights (against Sturt), a crowd of 7,329 was in attendance. Centrals played in their seventh consecutive SANFL grand final, tying the record for the most consecutive grand final appearances and setting a SANFL record of seven consecutive second-semi-final wins. After eight consecutive finals victories against Woodville-West Torrens (2000 to 2005), Centrals were defeated by the Eagles for the first time in the grand final.

=== 2007 ===
Centrals won the minor-round premiership and their sixth premiership flag in their eighth consecutive grand-final appearance, becoming the only club in SANFL history to contest eight consecutive grand finals and the only SANFL club with eight consecutive second-semifinal wins. They defeated Norwood by 158 points on 30 June 2007, the Redlegs' biggest loss on record.

=== 2008 ===
Centrals extended their run of consecutive grand-final appearances to nine, also winning their ninth consecutive second semi-final. They tied the SANFL record of seven premierships in a decade by defeating Glenelg in the SANFL Grand Final before a crowd of over 34,000 at AAMI Stadium.

=== 2009 ===
Centrals extended their records, winning their 10th consecutive second-semifinal, making their 10th consecutive grand final and winning their eighth premiership when they defeated Sturt in the grand final. The club's record of 10 grand finals and eight premierships in a decade (Note: 2000–2009) is an SANFL record.

=== 2010 ===
Central District won their fourth consecutive flag, defeating Norwood by six points before over 34,000 spectators. Ian Callinan won the Jack Oatey Medal for best on ground with four goals, and twin brothers Chris and James Gowans equalled Port Adelaide's Geof Motley's career-premiership medal record with their ninth SANFL Premiership Medal.

=== 2011 ===
Centrals won the minor premiership with 17 wins in 20 games, finishing three games ahead of Norwood; captain Paul Thomas finished third in the Magarey Medal count, three votes behind James Allan of North Adelaide. Thomas, judged by many as best on ground for the Bulldogs' round-22 win against Norwood, did not receive any Magarey votes because he was reported for a high tackle of Norwood's Darren Pfeiffer in the final quarter of the match. The match-review committee, who saw video evidence from the ABC telecast, said he was innocent but it was too late.

By finishing minor premiers, Centrals earned a week's rest before their second semi-final match on 25 September. They defeated Norwood in the second semi to move into a record 12th consecutive SANFL grand final and their 14th since 1995. Their opponent was Woodville-West Torrens, who defeated Norwood in the preliminary final by 44 points. In the grand final, Centrals came from behind to lose by three points to the Eagles.

Between 2000 and 2011, the Bulldogs qualified for the SANFL grand final every year; only 2002, 2006 and 2011 were not premiership-winning years. Although their grand-final record was 9–3, the Bulldogs had a 12–0 record in the second semi-final for the same period.

== Unsuccessful finals qualifications (2012–2017) ==
Central's run of 12 consecutive grand-final appearances ended in 2012. After finishing second in the minor round, they lost both finals: the qualifying to West Adelaide by 27 points, and the first semi-final to North Adelaide by 88 points. The Bulldogs qualified for the finals in 2013 for the 14th successive season, but lost the elimination final to North Adelaide. Centrals failed to qualify for the 2014 finals for the first time since 1999 and the second time in 21 seasons, finishing seventh after winning two games in the first 9 rounds and seven of the last eight before losing in the last round to North Adelaide and missing the finals by one win and percentage.

After being out of the 2015 top five all season, Centrals made another late dash and qualified by percentage for the finals by defeating fifth-place South Adelaide in the last round. The Bulldogs won six of their last eight games, including their last three. In the first two finals weeks, Centrals defeated both 2014 grand finalists (Norwood in the elimination final and Port Adelaide in the first semi-final) before losing the preliminary final to West Adelaide.

Qualifying for the 2016 finals in fifth place and for the 16th time in the last 17 seasons, the Bulldogs were defeated by the Adelaide Crows Reserves in the elimination final. They again qualified for the 2017 finals in fifth place on percentage after Glenelg lost in the last round; Centrals (fifth), South (sixth), and Glenelg (seventh) all finished with eight wins. The Bulldogs defeated Norwood in the elimination final for their fifth successive finals victory against the Redlegs. Centrals lost to Sturt by seven points in the first semi-final after trailing by two at three-quarter time. Their 2012–2017 finals record was three wins and six losses.

== 2018–2022: No finals qualifications ==
After qualifying for the finals 17 of the previous 18 seasons (2000–2017) and 23 of the previous 25 (1993–2017), Centrals failed to qualify for the 2018 finals. They finished eighth, their lowest position since 1992. At the end of the 2019 season, league coach Roy Laird retired after 17 seasons (including seven league flags). The Bulldogs then finished next to last from 2020 to 2022.

== 2023 finals ==
Central qualified for the 2023 finals for the first time in five years in fourth place after defeating Port Adelaide in the last minor-round game. Both teams played in the elimination final the following week, when Central defeated Port by seven points. Their finals campaign ended with a loss to Sturt in the first semi-final.

== Home ground ==
Elizabeth Oval (X Convenience Oval) is Central's home ground. The club's first league home game was against Glenelg on 11 July 1964.

== Roster ==
Central District Football Club
Senior list			Coaching staff
1 Harvey Howe; 2 Jake Gasper; 3 Kai Pudney; 4 Leyton Chisholm; 5 Jack Callinan; 7 Kyle Presbury (c); 8 Jai Larkins; 9 Kade Dittmar; 10 Harry Grant; 11 George Kendall; 12 Daniel Fairbrother; 13 Dayne Posthuma; 14 Mihail Lochowiack; 15 Billy Iles; 16 Dyson Sharp; 17 Maximus Monaghan; 18 Dale Pearce; 19 Marcus Barreau; 20 Justin Hoskin; 21 Jack Tomkinson	22 Jordan Tippins; 23 Hudson Vivian; 24 Kobe Annand; 25 Ryan Lane-Ellis; 26 Oliver Shaw; 27 Austin Kitschke; 28 Brinn Little; 29 Nick Lange; 31 Luca Whitelum; 32 Aiden Grace; 33 Zach Adams; 34 Ethan East; 36 Rhett Montgomerie; 37 Finn Reed; 38 Brodie Wills; 39 Lachlan Giles; 40 Chris Hooper; 41 Enrique Mazzeo; 42 Anzac Lochowiack; 43 Tallan Rosenwig; 44 Trent Tattoli	45 Brodie Tuck; 46 Jayden Matz; 47 James Noack; 48 Luigi Mondello; 49 Steven Clark; 50 Ethan Scholz; 51 Cooper Wilson; 52 Noah McDonald; 53 Riley McDonald; 54 Cooper Pyman; 55 Angus Vandenberg; 56 Nick Stokes; 57 Jonah Pyman; 58 Sam Sibbick; 59 Beau Thomas; 60 Ethan Schwerdt; 61 Mabil Ajak; 65 Tom Luhrs; 66 Mitch McDonald; 67 Isaiah Nettle	Head coach: Paul Thomas; Assistant coaches: Jeff Brown; Nick Russell; Matt Gallarello; Sam Milne; Legend: (c) Captain(s); (vc) Vice-captain(s); Long-term injury list; Updated: 2025 season Source(s): Senior list, Coaching staff

== Achievements ==
=== Team achievements ===
Premierships
Competition	Level	Wins	Years
South Australian National Football League	Men's Seniors	9	2000, 2001, 2003, 2004, 2005, 2007, 2008, 2009, 2010
South Australian National Football League	Women's Seniors	1	2023
South Australian National Football League	Men's Reserves	5	1971, 1989, 2002, 2003, 2012
South Australian National Football League	Under 19s (1937–2008)	4	1971, 1981, 1982, 2003
South Australian National Football League	Under 17s (1939–2008)	8	1966, 1977, 1978, 1979, 1985, 1992, 1996, 2004
South Australian National Football League	Under 16s (2010–present)	1	2023
Other titles and honours
Stanley H Lewis Trophy	Multiple	5	2001, 2002, 2003, 2004, 2007
Finishing positions
South Australian National Football League	Minor premiership (men's seniors)	11	1979, 1995, 1996, 2001, 2002, 2003, 2004, 2005, 2007, 2010, 2011
South Australian National Football League	Grand Finalists (men's seniors)	5	1995, 1996, 2002, 2006, 2011
South Australian National Football League	Wooden spoons (men's seniors)	2	1964, 1977
South Australian National Football League	Wooden spoons (women's seniors)	1	2020

=== Team records ===
- Highest score: 35.23 (233) vs West Torrens 4.11 (35) at Elizabeth Oval in round 4, 1988
- Lowest score: 1.6 (12) vs Port Adelaide, Round 17, 1967, Elizabeth Oval
- Greatest winning margin: 198 points vs West Torrens, Round 4, 1988, Elizabeth Oval
- Greatest losing margin: 238 points vs Glenelg, Round 17, 1975, Glenelg Oval
- Lowest winning score: 6.7 (43) vs Woodville-West Torrens 4.2 (26), Round 10, 2023, Elizabeth Oval
- Highest losing score: 23.13 (151) vs South Adelaide 26.11 (167), Round 14, 1976, Adelaide Oval
- SANFL Premiers: 9 (2000, 2001, 2003, 2004, 2005, 2007, 2008, 2009, 2010)
- SANFL Grand Finals: 14 (1995, 1996, 2000–2011)
- Home Ground: Elizabeth Oval (X Convenience Oval) – SANFL games 1964 to 2020 (479 games, 305 wins, 1 draw, 173 losses)
- Record attendance at Elizabeth Oval: 16,029 vs Port Adelaide in Round 18, 1984
- Record night attendance at My Money House Oval: 7,329 vs Sturt in April 2006
- Record attendance: 46,132 v Port Adelaide at Football Park, 1996 SANFL Grand Final
- Most games: 308 by Peter Vivian (1969–85)
- Most goals by a player in a match: 14 by Daniel Havelberg v Norwood, Round 13, 2007, Elizabeth Oval
- Most goals in a season: 104 by Greg Edwards in 1982
- Most goals for the club: 475 by Rudi Mandemaker (1986–92)
- First player to kick 100 goals in a SANFL season: Greg Edwards (1982 – 104 goals)
- Most years as coach: 17 (357 games) by Roy Laird (2003–2019)
- Most premierships as coach: 7 by Roy Laird (2003–05, 2007–10)
- Most years as captain: 9 by Paul Thomas (2007–2015)
- Most premierships as captain: 4, by Daniel Healy (2001, 2003–05) and Paul Thomas (2007–10)
- Most best & fairest (Norm Russell Medal): 3 by Jarrod Schiller (2014, 2019, 2021)
- Consecutive wins: 16 (Round 15, 2001 to Round 6, 2002)

=== Individual achievements ===
==== SANFL Hall of Fame ====
- Ken Eustice (2002)
- Donald Neil "Knuckles" Kerley (2002)
- John "The Rat" Platten (2002)
- Gary Window (2005)
- Chris Gowans (2014)
- James Gowans (2014)
- Peter "Milky" Vivian (2018)
- Daryl Hicks (2023)
- Sony Morey (2023)
- Roy Laird (2024)

==== Interstate football halls of fame ====
- Danny Hulm (Tasmania)
- Tom Grljusich (Western Australia)

==== Bob Quinn Medal ====
- 2002 – James Gowans
- 2003 – Paul Thomas
- 2004 – Paul Thomas
- 2007 – Chris Gowans
- 2008 – Paul Thomas
- 2009 – Chad O'Sullivan
- 2011 – Paul Thomas
- 2012 – Ryan Williams

==== Leading goalkickers ====
Player	Goals	Games	Average	Years
Rudi Mandemaker	475	141	3.37	1986–1992
David Saywell	380	150	2.53	1969–1974, 1976–1979
Daniel Schell	344	164	2.10	1998–2010
Chris Gowans	332	246	1.35	2000–2012
Wilbur Wilson	331	171	1.94	1974–1986

==== Reserves Magarey Medalists ====
Centrals players who have received the SANFL Reserves Magarey Medal for best and fairest player:

- Gary Window (1963; 1962 runner-up)
- Richard Lounder: 1989
- Damian Hicks: 1995 (tied)
- Neil McGoran: 1995 (tied)
- Justin Casserley: 2000
- Brenton Daniel: 2001
- Josh Coulter: 2002
- Nick Prokopec: 2003 (tied)

== Club song ==
(Sung to the tune of "The Yankee Doodle Boy (I'm A Yankee Doodle Dandy)":)

We're a winning team at Centrals
We're the mighty fighting 'dogs
We love our Club and we play to win
Riding the bumps with a grin, at Centrals
Come what may you'll find us striving
Teamwork is the thing that talks
One for all and all for one
Is the we play at Centrals
We are the mighty fighting 'Dogs!

== Ambassadors ==
In 2018, the club had seven ambassadors:

- Kevin Scarce – retired Royal Australian Navy officer and 34th Governor of South Australia
- John Platten – Brownlow Medal and Magarey Medal recipient, who played for Hawthorn and Central District
- Tony Pilkington – 5AA radio personality
- Kevin Norton – Professor of Exercise Science in the School of Health Sciences at the University of South Australia
- Ray Grigg – Mayor of Walkerville and former RAA president
- Rod Keane – former GM Holden executive director of manufacturing
- Darren Lehmann – former player and head coach of the Australia national cricket team

== Notes ==
Preceded by Port Adelaide	SANFL Premiers; 2000–2001	Succeeded by Sturt
Preceded by Sturt	SANFL Premiers; 2003–2005	Succeeded by Woodville-West Torrens
Preceded by Woodville-West Torrens	SANFL Premiers; 2007–2010	Succeeded by Woodville-West Torrens
