= 2022 SANFL season =

143rd season of the South Australian National Football League

- Teams: 10
- Premiers: Norwood; 31st premiership
- Minor premiers: North Adelaide; 16th minor premiership
- Magarey Medallist: Aaron Young; North Adelaide (23 votes)
- Ken Farmer Medallist: Daniel Menzel; Woodville-West Torrens (36 goals)

The 2022 South Australian National Football League season (officially the SANFL Hostplus League) was the 143rd season of the South Australian National Football League (SANFL), the highest-level Australian rules football competition in South Australia. The season commenced on 1 April and concluded with the Grand Final on 18 September.

== Premiership Season ==
=== Round 1 ===
	Round 1
Friday 1 April (4:10 pm)	Adelaide 18.15 (123)	def.	Port Adelaide 8.13 (61)	Adelaide Oval
Saturday 2 April (2:10 pm)	South Adelaide 13.7 (85)	def.	Central District 12.8 (80)	Hickinbotham Oval
Saturday 2 April (3:10 pm)	Glenelg 11.10 (76)	def.	Norwood 8.13 (61)	Glenelg Oval
Saturday 2 April (4:10 pm)	Woodville-West Torrens 9.12 (66)	def. by	North Adelaide 13.10 (88)	Woodville Oval
Saturday 2 April (7:40 pm)	West Adelaide 6.8 (44)	def. by	Sturt 12.15 (87)	Richmond Oval

=== Round 2 ===
	Round 2
Friday 8 April (7:40 pm)	Norwood 11.15 (81)	def. by	Woodville-West Torrens 12.11 (83)	Norwood Oval
Saturday 9 April (2:10 pm)	Central District 13.15 (93)	def.	West Adelaide 11.7 (73)	Elizabeth Oval
Saturday 9 April (2:10 pm)	North Adelaide 11.12 (78)	def. by	Adelaide 17.14 (116)	Prospect Oval
Saturday 9 April (2:10 pm)	Sturt 11.9 (75)	def. by	Glenelg 12.11 (83)	Unley Oval
Saturday 9 April (2:10 pm)	Port Adelaide 14.17 (101)	def. by	South Adelaide 17.9 (111)	Alberton Oval

=== Round 3 ===
	Round 3
Friday 15 April (1:10 pm)	South Adelaide 9.13 (67)	def. by	Sturt 13.7 (85)	Hickinbotham Oval
Friday 15 April (2:10 pm)	North Adelaide 16.14 (110)	def.	Central District 10.7 (67)	Prospect Oval
Friday 15 April (4:10 pm)	Glenelg 15.12 (102)	def.	Adelaide 13.9 (87)	Glenelg Oval
Friday 15 April (4:10 pm)	Woodville-West Torrens 8.15 (63)	def.	West Adelaide 7.8 (50)	Woodville Oval
Friday 15 April (7:35 pm)	Norwood 11.9 (75)	def.	Port Adelaide 8.11 (59)	Norwood Oval

=== Round 4 ===
	Round 4
Saturday 23 April (1:10 pm)	North Adelaide 8.11 (59)	def.	South Adelaide 6.12 (48)	Prospect Oval
Saturday 23 April (2:10 pm)	Central District 11.10 (76)	def. by	Adelaide 14.17 (101)	Elizabeth Oval
Sunday 24 April (2:05 pm)	Port Adelaide 7.8 (50)	def. by	Sturt 9.9 (63)	Alberton Oval
Sunday 24 April (2:10 pm)	Norwood 19.13 (127)	def.	West Adelaide 9.5 (59)	Centenary Oval
Monday 25 April (2:10 pm)	Woodville-West Torrens 12.7 (79)	def. by	Glenelg 13.6 (84)	Woodville Oval

=== Round 5 ===
	Round 5
Saturday 30 April (2:10 pm)	Central District 5.8 (38)	def. by	Woodville-West Torrens 13.10 (88)	Elizabeth Oval
Saturday 30 April (4:55 pm)	West Adelaide 5.5 (35)	def. by	North Adelaide 15.15 (105)	Richmond Oval
Sunday 1 May (1:05 pm)	South Adelaide 11.5 (71)	def. by	Adelaide 12.10 (82)	Hickinbotham Oval
Sunday 1 May (2:10 pm)	Glenelg 9.12 (66)	def. by	Port Adelaide 10.9 (69)	Glenelg Oval
Sunday 1 May (2:10 pm)	Sturt 12.9 (81)	def.	Norwood 7.11 (53)	Unley Oval

=== Round 6 ===
	Round 6
Saturday 7 May (1:10 pm)	West Adelaide 11.5 (71)	def. by	Adelaide 19.11 (125)	Richmond Oval
Saturday 7 May (2:05 pm)	Norwood 7.9 (51)	def. by	South Adelaide 8.9 (57)	Norwood Oval
Saturday 7 May (2:10 pm)	Port Adelaide 7.5 (47)	def. by	Woodville-West Torrens 11.7 (73)	Alberton Oval
Sunday 8 May (1:10 pm)	North Adelaide 15.7 (97)	def.	Glenelg 14.11 (95)	Prospect Oval
Sunday 8 May (2:10 pm)	Sturt 20.15 (135)	def.	Central District 5.7 (37)	Unley Oval

=== Round 7 ===
	Round 7
Friday 20 May (7:40 pm)	Norwood 10.14 (74)	def.	Central District 8.5 (53)	Norwood Oval
Friday 20 May (7:40 pm)	Woodville-West Torrens 11.7 (73)	def. by	Adelaide 15.16 (106)	Woodville Oval
Saturday 21 May (2:10 pm)	Glenelg 12.19 (91)	def.	South Adelaide 8.9 (57)	Glenelg Oval
Saturday 21 May (2:10 pm)	North Adelaide 17.8 (110)	def.	Sturt 10.4 (64)	Prospect Oval
Sunday 22 May (2:05 pm)	West Adelaide 12.9 (81)	def. by	Port Adelaide 15.15 (105)	Loxton Oval

=== Round 8 ===
	Round 8
Friday 27 May (7:40 pm)	Norwood 10.7 (67)	def.	Adelaide 9.8 (62)	Norwood Oval
Saturday 28 May (1:10 pm)	Port Adelaide 5.11 (41)	def. by	North Adelaide 12.16 (88)	Alberton Oval
Saturday 28 May (2:10 pm)	Central District 3.7 (25)	def. by	Glenelg 8.9 (57)	Elizabeth Oval
Saturday 28 May (2:10 pm)	South Adelaide 13.11 (89)	def.	West Adelaide 8.11 (59)	Hickinbotham Oval
Saturday 28 May (2:10 pm)	Sturt 6.10 (46)	def. by	Woodville-West Torrens 14.11 (95)	Unley Oval

=== Round 9 ===
	Round 9
Saturday 4 June (1:05 pm)	Glenelg 15.5 (95)	def.	West Adelaide 13.12 (90)	Glenelg Oval
Saturday 4 June (2:10 pm)	North Adelaide 9.9 (63)	def.	Norwood 7.10 (52)	Prospect Oval
Saturday 4 June (4:30 pm)	Sturt 11.10 (76)	def.	Adelaide 8.7 (55)	Adelaide Oval
Sunday 5 June (2:35 pm)	Woodville-West Torrens 4.4 (28)	def.	South Adelaide 3.9 (27)	Woodville Oval
Byes: Central District, Port Adelaide

=== Round 10 ===
	Round 10
Saturday 11 June (2:35 pm)	Central District 8.9 (57)	def. by	Port Adelaide 11.8 (74)	Elizabeth Oval
Monday 13 June (2:10 pm)	Glenelg 15.11 (101)	def.	Sturt 4.10 (34)	Glenelg Oval
Monday 13 June (2:10 pm)	South Adelaide 8.12 (60)	def.	North Adelaide 8.10 (58)	Hickinbotham Oval
Byes: Adelaide, Norwood, West Adelaide, Woodville-West Torrens

=== Round 11 ===
	Round 11
Saturday 18 June (1:05 pm)	Woodville-West Torrens 5.13 (43)	def. by	Central District 11.12 (78)	Woodville Oval
Saturday 18 June (1:10 pm)	West Adelaide 9.12 (66)	def. by	Adelaide 15.12 (102)	Richmond Oval
Sunday 19 June (1:10 pm)	Port Adelaide 11.10 (76)	def. by	Norwood 15.4 (94)	Alberton Oval
Byes: Glenelg, North Adelaide, South Adelaide, Sturt

=== Round 12 ===
	Round 12
Saturday 25 June (1:10 pm)	South Adelaide 7.6 (48)	def. by	Adelaide 15.17 (107)	Hickinbotham Oval
Saturday 25 June (2:10 pm)	Central District 12.7 (79)	def. by	North Adelaide 18.9 (117)	Elizabeth Oval
Saturday 25 June (2:10 pm)	Port Adelaide 4.13 (37)	def. by	Glenelg 11.10 (76)	Alberton Oval
Saturday 25 June (2:10 pm)	West Adelaide 11.10 (76)	def. by	Woodville-West Torrens 15.6 (96)	Richmond Oval
Saturday 25 June (2:35 pm)	Norwood 11.10 (76)	def.	Sturt 7.8 (50)	Norwood Oval

=== Round 13 ===
	Round 13
Saturday 2 July (1:10 pm)	Glenelg 8.4 (52)	def. by	Adelaide 19.12 (126)	Glenelg Oval
Saturday 2 July (2:10 pm)	Central District 10.6 (66)	def.	South Adelaide 10.5 (65)	Elizabeth Oval
Saturday 2 July (2:10 pm)	North Adelaide 20.16 (136)	def.	Port Adelaide 1.4 (10)	Prospect Oval
Saturday 2 July (2:10 pm)	Sturt 11.9 (75)	def.	West Adelaide 4.11 (35)	Unley Oval
Sunday 3 July (2:05 pm)	Woodville-West Torrens 10.6 (66)	def. by	Norwood 13.12 (90)	Woodville Oval

=== Round 14 ===
	Round 14
Saturday 9 July (1:10 pm)	West Adelaide 7.12 (54)	def. by	Central District 12.11 (83)	Richmond Oval
Saturday 9 July (2:05 pm)	South Adelaide 10.10 (70)	def.	Glenelg 3.7 (25)	Hickinbotham Oval
Saturday 9 July (2:10 pm)	Norwood 17.8 (110)	def.	North Adelaide 11.8 (74)	Norwood Oval
Saturday 9 July (2:10 pm)	Woodville-West Torrens 13.11 (89)	def.	Port Adelaide 4.5 (29)	Woodville Oval
Sunday 10 July (2:10 pm)	Sturt 13.4 (82)	def.	Adelaide 11.5 (71)	Unley Oval

=== Round 15 ===
	Round 15
Saturday 16 July (1:05 pm)	Glenelg 13.8 (86)	def.	Woodville-West Torrens 9.7 (61)	Glenelg Oval
Saturday 16 July (2:10 pm)	Central District 6.16 (52)	def. by	Sturt 8.8 (56)	Elizabeth Oval
Saturday 16 July (2:10 pm)	Port Adelaide 7.12 (54)	def. by	West Adelaide 12.9 (81)	Richmond Oval
Saturday 16 July (4:00 pm)	North Adelaide 6.12 (48)	def. by	Adelaide 10.15 (75)	Bennett Oval
Sunday 17 July (2:10 pm)	South Adelaide 6.8 (44)	def. by	Norwood 6.11 (47)	Hickinbotham Oval

=== Round 16 ===
	Round 16
Saturday 23 July (1:10 pm)	Norwood 8.17 (65)	def.	Adelaide 7.11 (53)	Norwood Oval
Saturday 23 July (2:10 pm)	Sturt 7.7 (49)	def. by	South Adelaide 8.7 (55)	Unley Oval
Saturday 23 July (2:10 pm)	West Adelaide 8.9 (57)	def. by	Glenelg 9.12 (66)	Richmond Oval
Saturday 23 July (7:40 pm)	Port Adelaide 11.8 (74)	def.	Central District 7.9 (51)	Woodville Oval
Sunday 24 July (2:05 pm)	North Adelaide 16.14 (110)	def.	Woodville-West Torrens 9.8 (62)	Prospect Oval

=== Round 17 ===
	Round 17
Saturday 6 August (1:35 pm)	Central District 6.11 (47)	def. by	Norwood 7.6 (48)	Elizabeth Oval
Saturday 6 August (2:10 pm)	Glenelg 7.15 (57)	def. by	North Adelaide 16.12 (108)	Glenelg Oval
Saturday 6 August (2:10 pm)	Sturt 13.7 (85)	def.	Port Adelaide 7.12 (54)	Unley Oval
Saturday 6 August (2:10 pm)	West Adelaide 10.8 (68)	def.	South Adelaide 8.15 (63)	Richmond Oval
Sunday 7 August (2:30 pm)	Woodville-West Torrens 10.16 (76)	def. by	Adelaide 17.14 (116)	Woodville Oval

=== Round 18 ===
	Round 18
Friday 12 August (7:40 pm)	Norwood 7.7 (49)	def.	Glenelg 6.6 (42)	Norwood Oval
Saturday 13 August (2:10 pm)	North Adelaide 11.7 (73)	def.	West Adelaide 10.7 (67)	Prospect Oval
Saturday 13 August (5:00 pm)	Central District 8.10 (58)	def. by	Adelaide 17.11 (113)	Adelaide Oval
Saturday 13 August (6:30 pm)	Woodville-West Torrens 6.7 (43)	def.	Sturt 4.12 (36)	Woodville Oval
Sunday 14 August (1:35 pm)	South Adelaide 10.9 (69)	def.	Port Adelaide 9.6 (60)	Hickinbotham Oval

=== Round 19 ===
	Round 19
Saturday 20 August (1:10 pm)	West Adelaide 8.9 (57)	def.	Norwood 7.14 (56)	Richmond Oval
Saturday 20 August (2:05 pm)	South Adelaide 9.18 (72)	def.	Woodville-West Torrens 7.9 (51)	Hickinbotham Oval
Saturday 20 August (2:10 pm)	Glenelg 12.8 (80)	def.	Central District 11.12 (78)	Glenelg Oval
Saturday 20 August (2:10 pm)	Sturt 11.11 (77)	def.	North Adelaide 8.7 (55)	Unley Oval
Saturday 20 August (3:20 pm)	Port Adelaide 11.9 (75)	def.	Adelaide 10.12 (72)	Adelaide Oval

== Ladder ==
Pos	Team	Pld	W	L	D	PF	PA	PP	Pts	Qualification
1	North Adelaide	18	13	5	0	1577	1181	57.18	26	Finals series
2	Adelaide	18	12	6	0	1692	1245	57.61	24	Finals series
3	Norwood (P)	18	12	6	0	1276	1102	53.66	24	Finals series
4	Glenelg	18	12	6	0	1334	1260	51.43	24	Finals series
5	Sturt	18	11	7	0	1256	1136	52.51	22	Finals series
6	South Adelaide	18	9	9	0	1158	1167	49.81	18	
7	Woodville-West Torrens	18	9	9	0	1235	1260	49.50	18	
8	Port Adelaide	18	5	13	0	1076	1490	41.93	10	
9	Central District	18	4	14	0	1118	1447	43.59	8	
10	West Adelaide	18	3	15	0	1123	1557	41.90	6	

Updated to match(es) played on 23 August 2022. Source:
Rules for classification: 1) points; 2) percentage; 3) number of points for.
(P) Premiers

== Finals series ==
Qualifying and elimination finals
2	Adelaide	18.9 (117)
3	Norwood	9.8 (62)
4	Glenelg	8.13 (61)
5	Sturt	6.9 (45)

Semi-finals
1	North Adelaide	15.8 (98)
Adelaide	13.10 (88)
Norwood	12.7 (79)
Glenelg	7.9 (51)

Preliminary final
Adelaide	10.10 (70)
Norwood	12.9 (81)

Grand final
North Adelaide	8.10 (58)
Norwood	8.11 (59)

=== Qualifying and Elimination Finals ===
	Elimination Final
Sunday August 28 (12:15 pm)	Glenelg 8.13 (61)	def.	Sturt 6.9 (45)	Adelaide Oval

	Qualifying Final
Sunday August 28 (3:15 pm)	Adelaide 18.9 (117)	def.	Norwood 9.8 (62)	Adelaide Oval

=== Semi-finals ===
	First Semi-final
Sunday September 4 (12:15 pm)	Norwood 12.7 (79)	def.	Glenelg 7.9 (51)	Adelaide Oval

	Second Semi-final
Sunday September 4 (3:15 pm)	North Adelaide 15.8 (98)	def.	Adelaide 13.10 (88)	Adelaide Oval

=== Preliminary final ===
	Preliminary Final
Sunday September 11 (2:45 pm)	Adelaide 10.10 (70)	def. by	Norwood 12.9 (81)	Adelaide Oval

=== Grand Final ===
2022 SANFL Grand Final
Sunday, 22 September (2:30 pm)	North Adelaide	def. by	Norwood	Adelaide Oval (crowd: 27,479)
4.2 (26); 4.7 (31); 6.10 (46); 8.10 (58)	Q1; Q2; Q3; Final	2.3 (15); 3.6 (24); 5.9 (39); 8.11 (59)	Umpires: Bowen, Bryce, Scott; Jack Oatey Medal: Harry Boyd; Television broadcast: Seven Network
Wilsdon 2, Young 2, Elbrow, Lockyer, Minervini, Moore	Goals	Panos 2, Carroll, Hamilton, Jarvis, Lowe, McLean, Richards

== Awards ==
=== Club best and fairest ===
Club	Award	Player	Ref.
Adelaide	State League Club Champion	Kieran Strachan	
Central District	Norm Russell Medal	Kyle Presbury & Travis Schiller	
Glenelg	John H. Ellers Trophy	Max Proud	
North Adelaide	Barrie Robran Club Champion	Campbell Combe	
Norwood	Michael Taylor Medal	Harry Boyd	
Port Adelaide	A.R. McLean Medal	Cam Sutcliffe	
South Adelaide	Knuckey Cup	Joseph Haines	
Sturt	P. T. Morton Medal	Casey Voss	
West Adelaide	Neil Kerley Medal	Hamish Hartlett	
Woodville-West Torrens	Perce Johns Medal	Riley Knight	

== See also ==
- 2022 SANFL Women's League season
