= 2024 SANFL season =

145th season of the South Australian National Football League

- Teams: 10
- Premiers: Glenelg; 7th premiership
- Minor premiers: Norwood; 20th minor premiership
- Magarey Medallist: Harry Boyd (Norwood – 34 votes) & Will Snelling (Sturt – 34 votes)
- Ken Farmer Medallist: Mitch Harvey (North Adelaide – 45 goals)

The 2024 South Australian National Football League season (officially the SANFL Hostplus League) was the 145th season of the South Australian National Football League (SANFL), the highest-level Australian rules football competition in South Australia. The season began on 28 March 2024.

Glenelg won their seventh senior premiership, defeating minor premiers Norwood in the Grand Final. Port Adelaide "won" their first wooden spoon since 1900.

== Premiership Season ==
=== Round 1 ===
	Round 1 (Easter Weekend)
Thursday 28 March (7:40 pm)	Norwood 11.11 (77)	def.	Sturt 7.8 (50)	Coopers Stadium
Friday 29 March (1:40 pm)	North Adelaide 9.12 (66)	def. by	Central District 14.9 (93)	Prospect Oval
Friday 29 March (2:10 pm)	South Adelaide 14.7 (91)	def. by	Adelaide 13.18 (96)	Flinders University Stadium
Friday 29 March (2:30 pm)	Woodville-West Torrens 20.13 (133)	def.	West Adelaide 10.9 (69)	Maughan Thiem Kia Oval
Friday 29 March (4:40 pm)	Glenelg 23.12 (150)	def.	Port Adelaide 13.6 (84)	Stratarama Stadium

=== Round 2 ===
	Round 2
Friday 12 April (7:40 pm)	Norwood 10.11 (71)	def.	Glenelg 7.5 (47)	Coopers Stadium
Saturday 13 April (2:30 pm)	Woodville-West Torrens 21.12 (138)	def.	North Adelaide 7.4 (46)	Maughan Thiem Kia Oval
Saturday 13 April (2:30 pm)	Central District 15.7 (97)	def.	Adelaide 5.12 (42)	X Convenience Oval
Sunday 14 April (2:10 pm)	West Adelaide 12.11 (83)	def.	Port Adelaide 11.13 (79)	Waikerie Oval, Waikerie
Sunday 14 April (2:10 pm)	South Adelaide 5.10 (40)	def. by	Sturt 16.9 (105)	Flinders University Stadium

=== Round 3 ===
	Round 3
Saturday 20 April (1:10 pm)	South Adelaide 10.7 (67)	def. by	Central District 14.9 (93)	Flinders University Stadium
Saturday 20 April (2:10 pm)	North Adelaide 10.3 (63)	def.	Sturt 8.9 (57)	Prospect Oval
Saturday 20 April (2:10 pm)	Glenelg 16.10 (106)	def.	Adelaide 10.8 (68)	Stratarama Stadium
Saturday 20 April (2:10 pm)	Norwood 6.14 (50)	def.	West Adelaide 5.7 (37)	Centenary Oval, Port Lincoln
Sunday 21 April (2:10 pm)	Woodville-West Torrens 12.11 (83)	def.	Port Adelaide 8.9 (57)	Maughan Thiem Kia Oval

=== Round 4 ===
	Round 4 (ANZAC Round)
Thursday 25 April (2:10 pm)	Glenelg 6.8 (44)	def. by	Sturt 11.16 (82)	Stratarama Stadium
Saturday 27 April (1:10 pm)	North Adelaide 12.12 (84)	def.	Adelaide 10.8 (68)	Prospect Oval
Saturday 27 April (2:10 pm)	West Adelaide 17.10 (112)	def.	South Adelaide 6.9 (45)	Hisense Stadium
Saturday 27 April (2:10 pm)	Central District 14.6 (90)	def.	Woodville-West Torrens 11.9 (75)	X Convenience Oval
Saturday 27 April (7:10 pm)	Port Adelaide 6.7 (43)	def. by	Norwood 8.13 (61)	Alberton Oval

=== Round 5 ===
	Round 5
Thursday 2 May (3:20 pm)	Adelaide 16.7 (103)	def.	Port Adelaide 8.13 (61)	Adelaide Oval
Saturday 4 May (2:10 pm)	North Adelaide 8.11 (59)	def. by	Norwood 10.7 (67)	Prospect Oval
Saturday 4 May (2:10 pm)	West Adelaide 6.9 (45)	def. by	Central District 9.12 (66)	Hisense Stadium
Sunday 5 May (2:10 pm)	South Adelaide 6.7 (43)	def. by	Glenelg 9.16 (70)	Flinders University Stadium
Sunday 5 May (2:10 pm)	Sturt 11.9 (75)	def. by	Woodville-West Torrens 12.11 (83)	Thomas Farms Oval
The Adelaide vs Port Adelaide match was played as a curtain-raiser to the AFL Showdown between Adelaide and Port Adelaide, hence the Thursday afternoon time slot

=== Round 6 ===
	Round 6
Friday 10 May (7:40 pm)	Norwood 10.12 (72)	def.	Adelaide 7.12 (54)	Coopers Stadium
Saturday 11 May (2:10 pm)	Central District 6.5 (41)	def. by	Sturt 11.10 (76)	X Convenience Oval
Saturday 11 May (2:10 pm)	Port Adelaide 5.5 (35)	def. by	North Adelaide 18.11 (119)	Alberton Oval
Saturday 11 May (2:10 pm)	Woodville-West Torrens 11.11 (77)	def.	South Adelaide 11.6 (72)	Maughan Thiem Kia Oval
Saturday 11 May (2:10 pm)	Glenelg 10.10 (70)	def.	West Adelaide 6.7 (43)	Stratarama Stadium

=== Round 7 ===
	Round 7
Saturday 25 May (2:10 pm)	West Adelaide 13.9 (87)	def.	North Adelaide 8.8 (56)	Hisense Stadium
Saturday 25 May (2:10 pm)	Central District 8.9 (57)	def. by	Norwood 16.11 (107)	X Convenience Oval
Saturday 25 May (2:10 pm)	South Adelaide 17.15 (117)	def.	Port Adelaide 7.2 (44)	Flinders University Stadium
Saturday 25 May (2:10 pm)	Sturt 15.12 (102)	def.	Adelaide 6.5 (41)	Thomas Farms Oval
Sunday 26 May (1:10 pm)	Woodville-West Torrens 10.7 (67)	def. by	Glenelg 11.12 (78)	Maughan Thiem Kia Oval

=== Round 8 ===
	Round 8
Friday 31 May (7:10 pm)	Port Adelaide 4.3 (27)	def. by	Sturt 6.15 (51)	Alberton Oval
Saturday 1 June (1:10 pm)	Glenelg 11.12 (78)	def.	Central District 10.11 (71)	Stratarama Stadium
Saturday 1 June (2:30 pm)	West Adelaide 11.8 (74)	def.	Adelaide 7.12 (54)	Hisense Stadium
Sunday 2 June (2:10 pm)	North Adelaide 14.10 (94)	def.	South Adelaide 8.8 (56)	Prospect Oval
Sunday 2 June (2:30 pm)	Norwood 8.12 (60)	def. by	Woodville-West Torrens 15.9 (99)	Coopers Stadium

=== Round 9 ===
	Round 9 (King's Birthday)
Saturday 8 June (1:10 pm)	South Adelaide 8.14 (62)	def.	Adelaide 8.7 (55)	Flinders University Stadium
Saturday 8 June (2:10 pm)	Woodville-West Torrens 7.12 (54)	def. by	Central District 8.12 (60)	Maughan Thiem Kia Oval
Monday 10 June (2:10 pm)	Glenelg 12.12 (84)	def.	North Adelaide 10.12 (72)	Stratarama Stadium
Monday 10 June (2:30 pm)	Sturt 9.11 (65)	def.	Norwood 5.7 (37)	Thomas Farms Oval
	Bye: Port Adelaide; West Adelaide

=== Round 10 ===
	Round 10
Saturday 15 June (1:10 pm)	Central District 14.8 (92)	def.	South Adelaide 4.5 (29)	X Convenience Oval
Saturday 15 June (2:10 pm)	Port Adelaide 15.7 (97)	def.	West Adelaide 10.17 (77)	Alberton Oval
Saturday 15 June (3:10 pm)	Woodville-West Torrens 15.12 (102)	def.	Adelaide 7.7 (49)	Maughan Thiem Kia Oval
	Bye: Glenelg; North Adelaide; Norwood; Sturt

=== Round 11 ===
	Round 11
Sunday 23 June (2:10 pm)	Norwood 18.14 (122)	def.	Port Adelaide 5.9 (39)	Coopers Stadium
Sunday 23 June (2:10 pm)	Sturt 10.15 (75)	def.	North Adelaide 9.9 (63)	Thomas Farms Oval
Sunday 23 June (2:30 pm)	West Adelaide 8.8 (56)	def. by	Glenelg 16.12 (108)	Hisense Stadium
	Bye: Adelaide; Central District; South Adelaide; Woodville-West Torrens

=== Round 12 ===
	Round 12
Saturday 29 June (2:10 pm)	Port Adelaide 7.11 (53)	def. by	Central District 12.6 (78)	Alberton Oval
Saturday 29 June (2:10 pm)	North Adelaide 8.15 (63)	def.	Woodville-West Torrens 6.4 (40)	Prospect Oval
Saturday 29 June (2:10 pm)	Sturt 10.10 (70)	def.	West Adelaide 3.7 (25)	Thomas Farms Oval
Saturday 29 June (2:10 pm)	Glenelg 7.15 (57)	def. by	Adelaide 15.6 (96)	Stratarama Stadium
Sunday 30 June (2:10 pm)	South Adelaide 4.7 (31)	def. by	Norwood 9.16 (70)	Flinders University Stadium

=== Round 13 ===
	Round 13
Sunday 7 July (1:10 pm)	Central District 5.9 (39)	def. by	Adelaide 11.9 (75)	X Convenience Oval
Sunday 7 July (2:10 pm)	Sturt 11.9 (75)	def.	South Adelaide 7.12 (54)	Thomas Farms Oval
Sunday 7 July (2:10 pm)	Glenelg 9.13 (67)	def.	Woodville-West Torrens 8.7 (55)	Stratarama Stadium
Sunday 7 July (2:10 pm)	West Adelaide 6.5 (41)	def. by	Norwood 17.13 (115)	Hisense Stadium
Sunday 7 July (2:30 pm)	North Adelaide 8.9 (57)	def. by	Port Adelaide 13.8 (86)	Prospect Oval

=== Round 14 ===
	Round 14
Saturday 13 July (1:10 pm)	Norwood 14.18 (102)	def.	Adelaide 5.9 (39)	Coopers Stadium
Saturday 13 July (2:10 pm)	Port Adelaide 9.7 (61)	def.	Glenelg 6.11 (47)	Alberton Oval
Saturday 13 July (2:10 pm)	Woodville-West Torrens 8.6 (54)	def. by	Sturt 8.14 (62)	Maughan Thiem Kia Oval
Saturday 13 July (2:10 pm)	Central District 11.5 (71)	def.	West Adelaide 10.5 (65)	X Convenience Oval
Saturday 13 July (2:10 pm)	South Adelaide 10.4 (64)	def. by	North Adelaide 9.18 (72)	Victor Harbor

=== Round 15 ===
	Round 15
Saturday 20 July (2:10 pm)	Norwood 12.14 (86)	def.	Central District 6.8 (44)	Coopers Stadium
Saturday 20 July (2:10 pm)	West Adelaide 12.6 (78)	def.	Woodville-West Torrens 5.9 (39)	Hisense Stadium
Saturday 20 July (2:10 pm)	North Adelaide 7.13 (55)	def. by	Adelaide 14.9 (93)	Prospect Oval
Sunday 21 July (2:10 pm)	Sturt 14.8 (92)	def.	Glenelg 10.12 (72)	Thomas Farms Oval
Sunday 21 July (2:10 pm)	Port Adelaide 12.8 (80)	def. by	South Adelaide 14.11 (95)	Alberton Oval

=== Round 16 ===
	Round 16
Saturday 27 July (2:10 pm)	Glenelg 11.15 (81)	def.	Norwood 6.11 (47)	Stratarama Stadium
Saturday 27 July (2:10 pm)	Central District 12.2 (74)	def.	North Adelaide 9.8 (62)	X Convenience Oval
Saturday 27 July (2:10 pm)	Sturt 9.14 (68)	def.	Port Adelaide 6.9 (45)	Thomas Farms Oval
Saturday 27 July (2:10 pm)	South Adelaide 10.11 (71)	def.	West Adelaide 7.8 (50)	Flinders University Stadium
Sunday 28 July (2:10 pm)	Woodville-West Torrens 8.12 (60)	def. by	Adelaide 11.10 (76)	Maughan Thiem Kia Oval

=== Round 17 ===
	Round 17
Saturday 10 August (2:10 pm)	Norwood 16.11 (107)	def.	South Adelaide 7.10 (52)	Coopers Stadium
Saturday 10 August (2:10 pm)	North Adelaide 16.7 (103)	def.	Glenelg 10.15 (75)	Prospect Oval
Saturday 10 August (2:10 pm)	Sturt 12.14 (86)	def.	Central District 8.4 (52)	Thomas Farms Oval
Sunday 11 August (12:10 pm)	West Adelaide 6.7 (43)	def. by	Adelaide 17.9 (111)	Adelaide Oval
Sunday 11 August (2:10 pm)	Port Adelaide 15.13 (103)	def.	Woodville-West Torrens 8.11 (59)	Alberton Oval

=== Round 18 ===
	Round 18
Friday 16 August (7:40 pm)	Norwood 18.10 (118)	def.	North Adelaide 9.9 (63)	Coopers Stadium
Saturday 17 August (2:10 pm)	Central District 6.9 (45)	def.	Glenelg 6.8 (44)	X Convenience Oval
Saturday 17 August (2:10 pm)	South Adelaide 9.7 (61)	def. by	Woodville-West Torrens 17.16 (118)	Flinders University Stadium
Saturday 17 August (2:10 pm)	West Adelaide 4.8 (32)	def. by	Sturt 13.11 (89)	Hisense Stadium
Saturday 17 August (3:20 pm)	Port Adelaide 6.11 (47)	def. by	Adelaide 19.10 (124)	Adelaide Oval

=== Round 19 ===
	Round 19
Saturday 24 August (2:10 pm)	Glenelg 21.22 (148)	def.	South Adelaide 3.12 (30)	Stratarama Stadium
Saturday 24 August (2:10 pm)	Central District 15.14 (104)	def.	Port Adelaide 5.6 (36)	X Convenience Oval
Saturday 24 August (2:10 pm)	Woodville-West Torrens 6.11 (47)	def. by	Norwood 19.8 (122)	Maughan Thiem Kia Oval
Saturday 24 August (2:10 pm)	North Adelaide 17.7 (109)	def.	West Adelaide 13.14 (92)	Prospect Oval
Saturday 24 August (2:10 pm)	Sturt 7.18 (60)	def.	Adelaide 5.16 (46)	Thomas Farms Oval

== Ladder ==
Pos	Team	Pld	W	L	D	PF	PA	PP	Pts	Qualification
1	Norwood	18	15	3	0	1491	948	61.13	30	Finals series
2	Sturt	18	15	3	0	1340	896	59.93	30	Finals series
3	Central District	18	12	6	0	1267	1146	52.51	24	Finals series
4	Glenelg (P)	18	11	7	0	1426	1186	54.59	22	Finals series
5	Woodville-West Torrens	18	8	10	0	1383	1288	51.78	16	Finals series
6	Adelaide (R)	18	8	10	0	1290	1315	49.52	16	
7	North Adelaide	18	8	10	0	1306	1402	48.23	16	
8	West Adelaide	18	5	13	0	1109	1433	43.63	10	
9	South Adelaide	18	4	14	0	1080	1558	40.94	8	
10	Port Adelaide (R)	18	4	14	0	1078	1598	40.28	8	

Updated to match(es) played on 24 August 2024. Source: sanfl.com.au
Rules for classification: 1) points; 2) percentage; 3) number of points for.
(P) Premiers

(R) = Reserves for AFL Seniors

== Finals series ==
=== Week one – Qualifying and elimination finals ===
	Elimination final
Sunday, 1 September (12:15 pm)	Glenelg 19.17 (131)	def.	Woodville-West Torrens 8.12 (60)	Adelaide Oval

	Qualifying final
Sunday, 1 September (3:15 pm)	Sturt 5.9 (39)	def. by	Central District 8.2 (50)	Adelaide Oval

=== Week two – Semi-finals ===
	First Semi-final
Sunday, 8 September (12:15 pm)	Sturt 9.4 (58)	def. by	Glenelg 14.5 (89)	Adelaide Oval

	Second Semi-final
Sunday, 8 September (3:15 pm)	Norwood 14.10 (94)	def.	Central District 5.5 (35)	Adelaide Oval

=== Week three – Preliminary final ===
	Preliminary final
Sunday, 15 September (3:15 pm)	Central District 8.12 (60)	def. by	Glenelg 15.8 (98)	Adelaide Oval

=== Week four – Grand Final ===
2024 SANFL Grand Final
Sunday, 22 September (2:30 pm)	Norwood	def. by	Glenelg	Adelaide Oval (crowd: 35,129)
2.4 (16); 7.5 (47); 9.7 (61); 11.10 (76)	Q1; Q2; Q3; Final	2.2 (14); 4.5 (29); 7.6 (48); 12.9 (81)	Umpires: Morgan, Scott, Williams; Jack Oatey Medal: Liam McBean; Television broadcast: Seven Network
Binder 2, Callow 2, Hamilton 2, Lowe 2, Murley	Goals	McBean 7, Hosie 2, Reynolds, Gerloff, Lyons
This was the fourth Grand Final between the two sides, having previously met in the 1950, 1975 and 1982 deciders, with Norwood winning all three.

== Team of the Year ==
The annual The Advertiser Team of the Year was released on the 5th of September prior to the semi-finals.

2024 The Advertiser SANFL Team of the Year
B:	Luke Edmonds (Sturt)	Tom Donnelly (Norwood)	Will Coomblas (Sturt)
HB:	Jez McLennan (Central District)	Jack Heard (Norwood)	Casey Voss (Sturt)
C:	Kobe Ryan (West Adelaide)	James Battersby (Sturt) (captain)	Matt Allen (Glenelg)
HF:	Baynen Lowe (Norwood)	Connor Ballenden (Woodville-West Torrens)	James Rowe (Woodville-West Torrens)
F:	Liam McBean (Glenelg) (vice-captain)	Mitch Harvey (Norwood)	Aiden Grace (Central District)
Foll:	Harry Boyd (Norwood)	Campbell Combe (North Adelaide)	Will Snelling (Sturt)
Int:	Harry Grant (Central District)	Kieran Strachan (Adelaide)	Tom Lewis (Sturt)
Int:	Sam Frost (West Adelaide)		
Coach:	Jade Rawlings (Norwood)		
