= 2018 SANFL season =

Australian-rules football season

- Teams: 10
- Premiers: North Adelaide; 14th premiership
- Minor premiers: Norwood; 19th minor premiership
- Magarey Medallist: Mitch Grigg; Norwood (26 votes)
- Ken Farmer Medallist: Mark Evans; Sturt (42 goals)
- Matches played: 96
- Highest: 40,355 (Grand Final, Norwood vs North Adelaide)

The 2018 South Australian National Football League season (officially the SANFL Macca’s League) was the 139th season of the South Australian National Football League (SANFL) Australian rules football competition. The season commenced on Friday, 30 March (Good Friday) and concluded with the SANFL Grand Final on Sunday, 23 September. North Adelaide, who had finished last in 2017 and fifth place at the end of the home-and-away season, defeated minor premier Norwood by 19 points to win their fourteenth premiership, their first since 1991.

== Premiership Season ==
=== Round 1 ===
	Round 1 (Easter Weekend)
Friday 30 March (1:10 pm)	South Adelaide 14.8 (92)	def.	Glenelg 7.12 (54)	Hickinbotham Oval (crowd: 3,143)
Friday 30 March (2:10 pm)	Central District 17.14 (116)	def.	North Adelaide 8.7 (55)	Elizabeth Oval (crowd: 3,782)
Friday 30 March (4:10 pm)	West Adelaide 7.10 (52)	def. by	Woodville-West Torrens 12.14 (86)	Richmond Oval (crowd: 2,547)
Saturday 31 March (2:40 pm)	Port Adelaide 19.14 (128)	def.	Adelaide 4.9 (33)	Alberton Oval (crowd: 2,451)
Monday 2 April (3:10 pm)	Norwood 7.15 (57)	def. by	Sturt 9.15 (69)	Norwood Oval (crowd: 5,286)

=== Round 2 ===
	Round 2
Friday 6 April (7:10 pm)	Glenelg 14.5 (89)	def. by	Port Adelaide 14.8 (92)	Glenelg Oval (crowd: 2,251)
Sunday 8 April (1:10 pm)	North Adelaide 25.14 (164)	def.	West Adelaide 2.14 (26)	Prospect Oval (crowd: 1,952)
Sunday 8 April (2:10 pm)	Norwood 19.13 (127)	def.	South Adelaide 11.14 (80)	Norwood Oval (crowd: 2,290)
Sunday 8 April (2:10 pm)	Woodville-West Torrens 13.12 (90)	def.	Central District 8.15 (63)	Woodville Oval (crowd: 1,729)
Sunday 8 April (2:10 pm)	Sturt 19.4 (118)	def.	Adelaide 10.9 (69)	Unley Oval (crowd: 3,143)

=== Round 3 ===
	Round 3
Saturday 14 April (2:10 pm)	Central District 8.6 (54)	def. by	West Adelaide 8.15 (63)	Elizabeth Oval (crowd: 1,348)
Saturday 14 April (2:10 pm)	Port Adelaide 4.4 (28)	drew with	Woodville-West Torrens 2.16 (28)	Alberton Oval (crowd: 1,589)
Saturday 14 April (2:10 pm)	South Adelaide 9.6 (60)	def.	Adelaide 6.4 (40)	Hickinbotham Oval (crowd: 857)
Saturday 14 April (4:10 pm)	Glenelg 15.14 (104)	def.	Norwood 10.13 (73)	Glenelg Oval (crowd: 1,798)
Sunday 15 April (2:10 pm)	Sturt 7.9 (51)	def. by	North Adelaide 8.6 (54)	Unley Oval (crowd: 2,972)

=== Round 4 ===
	Round 4 (ANZAC Round)
Saturday 21 April (2:10 pm)	Central District 21.11 (137)	def.	Adelaide 10.7 (67)	Elizabeth Oval (crowd: 1,590)
Saturday 21 April (2:40 pm)	North Adelaide 21.7 (133)	def.	Norwood 13.11 (89)	Prospect Oval (crowd: 2,469)
Sunday 22 April (2:10 pm)	Woodville-West Torrens 18.12 (120)	def.	Glenelg 8.11 (59)	Woodville Oval (crowd: 1,972)
Tuesday 24 April (7:10 pm)	West Adelaide 12.12 (84)	def.	South Adelaide 12.10 (82)	Richmond Oval (crowd: 2,103)
Wednesday 25 April (1:10 pm)	Sturt 12.11 (83)	def.	Port Adelaide 8.10 (58)	Unley Oval (crowd: 7,965)

=== Round 5 ===
	Round 5
Friday 27 April (7:20 pm)	Norwood 14.23 (107)	def.	Adelaide 13.8 (86)	Norwood Oval (crowd: 2,396)
Saturday 28 April (2:10 pm)	Glenelg 4.14 (38)	def. by	Central District 10.11 (71)	Glenelg Oval (crowd: 2,055)
Sunday 29 April (2:10 pm)	Woodville-West Torrens 13.4 (82)	def. by	North Adelaide 14.7 (91)	Woodville Oval (crowd: 2,233)
Byes: Port Adelaide, South Adelaide, Sturt, West Adelaide

=== Round 6 ===
	Round 6
Friday 4 May (7:10 pm)	West Adelaide 10.5 (65)	def. by	Glenelg 13.12 (90)	Richmond Oval (crowd: 1,444)
Friday 4 May (7:20 pm)	Norwood 17.12 (114)	def.	Port Adelaide 13.12 (90)	Norwood Oval (crowd: 2,642)
Saturday 5 May (1:10 pm)	South Adelaide 11.18 (84)	def.	Central District 11.9 (75)	Hickinbotham Oval (crowd: 1,215)
Saturday 5 May (2:10 pm)	North Adelaide 12.10 (82)	def.	Adelaide 9.6 (60)	Prospect Oval (crowd: 1,784)
Sunday 6 May (2:10 pm)	Sturt 9.7 (61)	def. by	Woodville-West Torrens 14.10 (94)	Unley Oval (crowd: 3,054)

=== State Game ===
	2018 State Game
Saturday 12 May (2:10 pm)	SANFL 11.10 (76)	def. by	WAFL 15.12 (102)	Adelaide Oval
Fos Williams Medal (SANFL): Zane Kirkwood (Sturt); Simpson Medal (WAFL): Jye Bolton (Claremont)

=== Round 7 ===
	Round 7
Saturday 19 May (2:10 pm)	Central District 10.10 (70)	def. by	Sturt 16.9 (105)	Elizabeth Oval (crowd: 1,864)
Saturday 19 May (2:10 pm)	Woodville-West Torrens 8.12 (60)	def. by	Norwood 17.15 (117)	Woodville Oval (crowd: 1,929)
Saturday 19 May (2:10 pm)	Glenelg 17.8 (110)	def.	Adelaide 11.11 (77)	Glenelg Oval (crowd: 1,721)
Saturday 19 May (2:10 pm)	North Adelaide 8.10 (58)	def. by	South Adelaide 15.5 (95)	Prospect Oval (crowd: 1,879)
Sunday 20 May (2:10 pm)	Port Adelaide 8.8 (56)	def. by	West Adelaide 13.10 (88)	Alberton Oval (crowd: 1,501)

=== Round 8 ===
	Round 8
Friday 25 May (7:20 pm)	Norwood 23.11 (149)	def.	Central District 7.11 (53)	Norwood Oval (crowd: 2,964)
Saturday 26 May (2:10 pm)	Port Adelaide 4.8 (32)	def. by	North Adelaide 17.9 (111)	Alberton Oval (crowd: 2,378)
Saturday 26 May (2:10 pm)	South Adelaide 7.8 (50)	def. by	Woodville-West Torrens 9.10 (64)	Hickinbotham Oval (crowd: 1,311)
Saturday 26 May (2:10 pm)	Sturt 15.11 (101)	def.	Glenelg 8.9 (57)	Unley Oval (crowd: 3,213)
Saturday 26 May (2:40 pm)	West Adelaide 20.12 (132)	def.	Adelaide 9.9 (63)	Richmond Oval (crowd: 1,573)

=== Round 9 ===
	Round 9
Saturday 2 June (2:10 pm)	West Adelaide 10.5 (65)	def. by	Sturt 13.6 (84)	Richmond Oval (crowd: 2,264)
Sunday 3 June (1:10 pm)	South Adelaide 16.10 (106)	def.	Port Adelaide 10.11 (71)	Hickinbotham Oval (crowd: 1,774)
Byes: Adelaide, Central District, Glenelg, North Adelaide, Norwood, Woodville-West Torrens

=== Round 10 ===
	Round 10 (Queen's Birthday)
Saturday 9 June (2:10 pm)	Central District 9.5 (59)	def. by	Port Adelaide 12.5 (77)	Elizabeth Oval (crowd: 2,238)
Saturday 9 June (2:10 pm)	West Adelaide 14.10 (94)	def. by	Norwood 13.17 (95)	Richmond Oval (crowd: 2,494)
Saturday 9 June (2:40 pm)	Woodville-West Torrens 16.18 (114)	def.	Adelaide 9.6 (60)	Woodville Oval (crowd: 1,735)
Monday 11 June (2:10 pm)	Glenelg 11.6 (72)	def. by	North Adelaide 12.10 (82)	Glenelg Oval (crowd: 2,083)
Monday 11 June (2:10 pm)	Sturt 9.12 (66)	def. by	South Adelaide 11.8 (74)	Unley Oval (crowd: 2,810)

=== Round 11 ===
	Round 11
Saturday 16 June (2:10 pm)	Woodville-West Torrens 11.11 (77)	def.	West Adelaide 8.8 (56)	Woodville Oval (crowd: 1,341)
Saturday 16 June (2:40 pm)	Norwood 12.13 (85)	def.	Glenelg 7.11 (53)	Norwood Oval (crowd: 2,008)
Sunday 17 June (2:10 pm)	North Adelaide 14.11 (95)	def.	Central District 13.8 (86)	Prospect Oval (crowd: 2,179)
Sunday 17 June (2:10 pm)	South Adelaide 22.8 (140)	def.	Adelaide 4.4 (28)	Hickinbotham Oval (crowd: 1,087)
Sunday 17 June (2:40 pm)	Port Adelaide 10.7 (67)	def.	Sturt 9.6 (60)	Alberton Oval (crowd: 1,802)

=== Round 12 ===
	Round 12 (Split Round)
Saturday 23 June (2:10 pm)	Central District 12.8 (80)	def.	South Adelaide 11.9 (75)	Elizabeth Oval (crowd: 1,715)
Saturday 23 June (2:10 pm)	West Adelaide 7.5 (47)	def. by	North Adelaide 13.17 (95)	Richmond Oval (crowd: 1,823)
Saturday 23 June (2:40 pm)	Glenelg 6.10 (46)	def. by	Woodville-West Torrens 14.9 (93)	Glenelg Oval (crowd: 1,772)
Sunday 1 July (2:10 pm)	Port Adelaide 8.12 (60)	def. by	Norwood 13.10 (88)	Alberton Oval (crowd: 2,959)
Sunday 1 July (2:10 pm)	Sturt 20.16 (136)	def.	Adelaide 9.10 (64)	Unley Oval (crowd: 3,469)

=== Round 13 ===
	Round 13
Saturday 7 July (1:10 pm)	Norwood 13.24 (102)	def.	Adelaide 7.9 (51)	Norwood Oval (crowd: 2,236)
Saturday 7 July (2:10 pm)	Central District 9.11 (65)	def.	Glenelg 9.9 (63)	Elizabeth Oval (crowd: 1,482)
Saturday 7 July (2:10 pm)	South Adelaide 6.13 (49)	def. by	West Adelaide 10.10 (70)	Hickinbotham Oval (crowd: 1,410)
Sunday 8 July (2:10 pm)	Woodville-West Torrens 11.10 (76)	def.	Port Adelaide 9.5 (59)	Woodville Oval (crowd: 2,161)
Sunday 8 July (2:10 pm)	North Adelaide 12.8 (80)	def. by	Sturt 16.11 (107)	Prospect Oval (crowd: 2,800)

=== Round 14 ===
	Round 14
Saturday 14 July (1:40 pm)	Sturt 11.12 (78)	def. by	Norwood 20.12 (132)	Unley Oval (crowd: 3,759)
Saturday 14 July (2:10 pm)	Glenelg 10.6 (66)	def.	South Adelaide 9.9 (63)	Glenelg Oval (crowd: 1,870)
Saturday 14 July (2:10 pm)	North Adelaide 8.10 (58)	def. by	Woodville-West Torrens 18.13 (121)	Prospect Oval (crowd: 2,194)
Saturday 14 July (2:10 pm)	West Adelaide 14.18 (102)	def.	Central District 11.5 (71)	Richmond Oval (crowd: 1,760)
Sunday 15 July (1:10 pm)	*Adelaide 17.14 (116)	def.	Port Adelaide 8.12 (60)	Kadina Oval
*This was Adelaide's only win for the season.

=== Round 15 ===
	Round 15
Friday 20 July (7:20 pm)	Norwood 18.17 (125)	def.	West Adelaide 6.11 (47)	Norwood Oval
Saturday 21 July (2:10 pm)	Woodville-West Torrens 9.6 (60)	def. by	Sturt 12.11 (83)	Woodville Oval (crowd: 1,876)
Saturday 21 July (2:10 pm)	Port Adelaide 9.14 (68)	def. by	Glenelg 16.7 (103)	Alberton Oval (crowd: 1,608)
Saturday 21 July (2:10 pm)	South Adelaide 15.11 (101)	def.	North Adelaide 9.6 (60)	Hickinbotham Oval (crowd: 1,267)
Saturday 21 July (2:40 pm)	Central District 7.13 (55)	def.	Adelaide 6.3 (39)	Elizabeth Oval (crowd: 2,378)

=== Round 16 ===
	Round 16
Friday 27 July (7:20 pm)	Norwood 16.16 (112)	def.	Woodville-West Torrens 12.6 (78)	Norwood Oval (crowd: 3,327)
Saturday 28 July (2:10 pm)	Port Adelaide 6.7 (43)	def. by	South Adelaide 17.15 (117)	Alberton Oval (crowd: 1,474)
Saturday 28 July (2:40 pm)	North Adelaide 22.9 (141)	def.	Adelaide 19.7 (121)	Prospect Oval (crowd: 1,726)
Sunday 29 July (2:10 pm)	Glenelg 13.12 (90)	def.	West Adelaide 8.13 (61)	Glenelg Oval (crowd: 2,077)
Sunday 29 July (2:10 pm)	Sturt 18.12 (120)	def.	Central District 10.9 (69)	Unley Oval (crowd: 2,661)

=== Round 17 ===
	Round 17 (Split Round)
Saturday 4 August (1:10 pm)	West Adelaide 12.15 (87)	def.	Port Adelaide 9.7 (61)	Richmond Oval (crowd: 1,100)
Sunday 5 August (2:10 pm)	North Adelaide 8.5 (53)	def. by	Glenelg 8.8 (56)	Prospect Oval
Saturday 11 August (1:10 pm)	Central District 6.6 (42)	def. by	Norwood 12.13 (85)	Elizabeth Oval (crowd: 1,567)
Sunday 12 August (2:10 pm)	Woodville-West Torrens 16.10 (106)	def.	Adelaide 9.7 (61)	Woodville Oval (crowd: 5,357)
Sunday 12 August (2:10 pm)	South Adelaide 8.11 (59)	def. by	Sturt 11.6 (72)	Hickinbotham Oval

=== Round 18 ===
	Round 18
Friday 17 August (7:20 pm)	Norwood 11.13 (79)	def.	North Adelaide 9.10 (64)	Norwood Oval (crowd: 3,481)
Saturday 18 August (1:10 pm)	Sturt 9.16 (70)	def.	West Adelaide 6.8 (44)	Unley Oval (crowd: 2,699)
Saturday 18 August (2:10 pm)	Woodville-West Torrens 11.7 (73)	def. by	South Adelaide 12.7 (79)	Woodville Oval (crowd: 1,422)
Saturday 18 August (2:10 pm)	Glenelg 20.6 (126)	def.	Adelaide 10.9 (69)	Glenelg Oval (crowd: 1,507)
Sunday 19 August (1:10 pm)	Port Adelaide 10.6 (66)	def. by	Central District 14.4 (88)	Alberton Oval (crowd: 1,640)

=== Round 19 ===
	Round 19
Saturday 25 August (2:10 pm)	Central District 9.9 (63)	def. by	Woodville-West Torrens 13.11 (89)	Elizabeth Oval (crowd: 1,926)
Saturday 25 August (2:10 pm)	North Adelaide 11.12 (78)	def.	Port Adelaide 11.8 (74)	Prospect Oval (crowd: 2,201)
Sunday 26 August (2:10 pm)	Glenelg 13.7 (85)	def.	Sturt 11.14 (80)	Glenelg Oval (crowd: 3,461)
Sunday 26 August (2:10 pm)	South Adelaide 16.11 (107)	def.	Norwood 12.9 (81)	Hickinbotham Oval (crowd: 1,928)
Sunday 26 August (2:10 pm)	West Adelaide 19.17 (131)	def.	Adelaide 10.7 (67)	Richmond Oval (crowd: 1,696)

== Ladder ==
2018 SANFL Ladder
Pos	Team	Pld	W	L	D	PF	PA	PP	Pts
1	Norwood	18	14	4	0	1818	1348	57.42	28
2	Woodville-West Torrens	18	12	5	1	1511	1198	55.78	25
3	Sturt	18	12	6	0	1544	1258	55.10	24
4	South Adelaide	18	11	7	0	1514	1213	55.52	22
5	North Adelaide (P)	18	11	7	0	1554	1415	52.34	22
6	Glenelg	18	9	9	0	1361	1410	49.12	18
7	West Adelaide	18	8	10	0	1314	1479	47.05	16
8	Central District	18	7	11	0	1316	1462	47.37	14
9	Port Adelaide	18	4	13	1	1190	1525	43.83	9
10	Adelaide	18	1	17	0	1171	1985	37.10	2

Rules for classification: 1) points; 2) percentage; 3) number of points for.
(P) Premiers

== Finals series ==
=== Qualifying and Elimination Finals ===
	Elimination Final
Sunday 2 September (12:15 pm)	South Adelaide 10.10 (70)	def. by	North Adelaide 14.6 (90)	Adelaide Oval (crowd: see below)

	Qualifying Final
Sunday 2 September (3:15 pm)	Woodville-West Torrens 8.13 (61)	def.	Sturt 6.4 (40)	Adelaide Oval (crowd: 8,632)

=== Semi-finals ===
	First Semi-final
Sunday 9 September (12:15 pm)	Sturt 8.5 (53)	def. by	North Adelaide 16.15 (111)	Adelaide Oval (crowd: see below)

	Second Semi-final
Sunday 9 September (3:15 pm)	Norwood 9.15 (69)	def.	Woodville-West Torrens 7.10 (52)	Adelaide Oval (crowd: 13,102)

=== Preliminary final ===
The preliminary final was highly controversial after it was discovered that North Adelaide played part of the final quarter with nineteen men on the field.

Woodville-West Torrens led North Adelaide by as much as 47 points during the third quarter, before North Adelaide staged a comeback, and by three-quarter time the lead was only twenty points, Woodville-West Torrens 10.8 (68) to North Adelaide 7.6 (48). At the start of the final quarter, North Adelaide midfielder Aiden Tropiano, who was listed as starting the quarter on the bench, instead took to the field, and North Adelaide played the first 3:39 with nineteen on the field before the club recognised its error and took the extra man off the ground. During that time, Woodville-West Torrens officials are understood to have complained to the reserve umpire and interchange steward, but no head count was staged – as this procedure requires the team captain to request one from the on-field umpire – nor was a free kick awarded. North Adelaide scored 1.2 (8) during the period of the extra man.

The rest of the quarter was high-scoring and thrilling, with Woodville-West Torrens pushing the margin back out to 21 points, before North Adelaide kicked seven straight goals in twelve minutes of play to take a 22-point lead in the 23rd minute of the game. Woodville-West Torrens responded, kicking three goals in five minutes, just falling short of completing their own comeback. At the final siren, North Adelaide 15.10 (100) defeated Woodville-West Torrens 14.11 (95) by five points. Immediately, the eight points North Adelaide had scored with the extra man on the field came under question.

On Monday 17 September, Woodville-West Torrens lodged an official protest against the result, and a SANFL tribunal hearing was held on Monday night. After the hearing, the tribunal ruled that North Adelaide's five point win would stand, owing to there being no provision in the SANFL constitution, rules or regulations allowing for the result to be changed in these circumstances; but it fined the club $10,000 and docked four premiership points from the club's 2019 result. The national Laws of the Game were amended the following season, introducing a formal provision for a league to review, identify and impose a penalty (including reversal of the match result) for an incident of too many players on the ground if that incident was identified in a post match video review, without a head count having been executed during the match.

	Preliminary Final
Sunday, 16 September (2:15 pm)	Woodville-West Torrens 14.11 (95)	def. by	North Adelaide 15.10 (100)	Adelaide Oval (crowd: 7,419)

=== Grand Final ===
2018 SANFL Grand Final
Sunday 23 September (2:40 pm)	Norwood	def. by	North Adelaide	Adelaide Oval (crowd: 40,355)
3.7 (25); 7.11 (53); 12.14 (86); 15.15 (105)	Q1; Q2; Q3; Final	5.0 (30); 9.4 (58); 14.7 (91); 19.10 (124)	Umpires: Corey Bowen, Toby Medlin, Mitch Harris; Jack Oatey Medal: Mitch Grigg (Norwood); Television broadcast: Seven Network
