= 2017 SANFL season =

- Teams: 10
- Premiers: Sturt; 15th premiership
- Minor premiers: Woodville-West Torrens; 7th minor premiership
- Magarey Medallist: Mitch Grigg; Norwood (23 votes)
- Ken Farmer Medallist: Brett Eddy; Port Adelaide (53 goals)
- Matches played: 96
- Highest: 39,813 (Grand Final, Port Adelaide vs Sturt)

The 2017 South Australian National Football League season (officially the SANFL Macca's League) was the 138th season of the South Australian National Football League (SANFL) Australian rules football competition.

The season commenced on 7 April and concluded with the Grand Final on 24 September. Sturt won their second consecutive premiership and 15th overall, defeating Port Adelaide by one point in the Grand Final.

== Premiership season ==
=== Round 1 ===
	Round 1
Friday 7 April (7:10 pm)	Glenelg 15.12 (102)	def.	Port Adelaide 13.7 (85)	Glenelg Oval (crowd: 2,915)
Friday 7 April (7:10 pm)	West Adelaide 11.4 (70)	def. by	South Adelaide 11.7 (73)	Richmond Oval (crowd: 1,701)
Friday 7 April (7:20 pm)	Norwood 12.16 (88)	def.	North Adelaide 9.12 (66)	Norwood Oval (crowd: 3,874)
Saturday 8 April (2:40 pm)	Central District 6.14 (50)	def. by	Woodville-West Torrens 14.13 (97)	Elizabeth Oval (crowd: 2,013)
Sunday 9 April (2:10 pm)	Sturt 9.10 (64)	def. by	Adelaide 10.6 (66)	Unley Oval (crowd: 3,291)

=== Round 2 ===
	Round 2
Thursday 13 April (7:20 pm)	Norwood 13.8 (86)	def. by	Port Adelaide 12.17 (89)	Norwood Oval (crowd: 6,098)
Friday 14 April (1:10 pm)	North Adelaide 17.9 (111)	def.	Central District 13.10 (88)	Prospect Oval (crowd: 2,952)
Friday 14 April (4:10 pm)	Glenelg 20.11 (131)	def.	Sturt 11.4 (70)	Glenelg Oval (crowd: 4,800)
Saturday 15 April (1:10 pm)	Woodville-West Torrens 19.9 (123)	def.	West Adelaide 9.9 (63)	Woodville Oval (crowd: 1,769)
Sunday 16 April (2:10 pm)	South Adelaide 13.6 (84)	def. by	Adelaide 13.12 (90)	Encounter Bay Oval (crowd: 2,379)

=== Round 3 ===
	Round 3
Friday 21 April (7:10 pm)	West Adelaide 5.7 (37)	def. by	Norwood 12.9 (81)	Richmond Oval (crowd: 2,076)
Saturday 22 April (2:10 pm)	Port Adelaide 16.15 (111)	def.	North Adelaide 7.6 (48)	Alberton Oval (crowd: 2,583)
Saturday 22 April (2:10 pm)	South Adelaide 12.6 (78)	def.	Glenelg 11.7 (73)	Hickinbotham Oval (crowd: 1,589)
Saturday 22 April (2:40 pm)	Central District 13.19 (97)	def.	Adelaide 6.7 (43)	Elizabeth Oval (crowd: 1,606)
Tuesday 25 April (2:10 pm)	Sturt 5.18 (48)	def. by	Woodville-West Torrens 9.8 (62)	Unley Oval (crowd: 3,892)

=== Round 4 ===
	Round 4
Friday 28 April (7:10 pm)	Norwood 13.7 (85)	def. by	South Adelaide 13.11 (89)	Norwood Oval (crowd: 2,491)
Saturday 29 April (1:10 pm)	Adelaide 8.11 (59)	def. by	Port Adelaide 14.10 (90)	Woodville Oval (crowd: 1,348)
Saturday 29 April (2:10 pm)	Glenelg 12.9 (81)	def.	Central District 11.10 (76)	Glenelg Oval (crowd: 2,542)
Saturday 29 April (2:10 pm)	North Adelaide 15.14 (104)	def.	West Adelaide 12.10 (82)	Prospect Oval (crowd: 1,756)
Byes: Sturt, Woodville-West Torrens

=== Round 5 ===
	Round 5 (Split Round)
Saturday 6 May (2:10 pm)	Central District 14.12 (92)	def. by	Norwood 19.6 (120)	Elizabeth Oval (crowd: 2,047)
Saturday 6 May (2:10 pm)	Woodville-West Torrens 14.14 (98)	def.	Adelaide 8.5 (53)	Woodville Oval (crowd: 1,391)
Sunday 7 May (2:10 pm)	South Adelaide 13.7 (85)	def.	North Adelaide 6.5 (35)	Hickinbotham Oval (crowd: 1,452)
Sunday 7 May (2:10 pm)	Port Adelaide 19.10 (124)	def.	Sturt 9.10 (64)	Alberton Oval (crowd: 2,886)
Saturday 13 May (2:10 pm)	Woodville-West Torrens 18.11 (119)	def.	Glenelg 7.7 (49)	Woodville Oval (crowd: 1,803)
Saturday 13 May (2:40 pm)	Sturt 11.15 (81)	def.	West Adelaide 8.13 (61)	Unley Oval (crowd: 2,413)

=== Round 6 ===
	Round 6
Friday 19 May (7:20 pm)	Norwood 14.9 (93)	def.	Glenelg 9.8 (62)	Norwood Oval (crowd: 3,300)
Saturday 20 May (2:10 pm)	Central District 9.12 (66)	def. by	South Adelaide 14.9 (93)	Elizabeth Oval (crowd: 1,663)
Saturday 20 May (2:10 pm)	Port Adelaide 6.7 (43)	def. by	Woodville-West Torrens 9.10 (64)	Alberton Oval (crowd: 3,199)
Saturday 20 May (2:10 pm)	West Adelaide 10.10 (70)	def. by	Adelaide 16.10 (106)	Richmond Oval (crowd: 1,405)
Saturday 20 May (2:40 pm)	North Adelaide 10.3 (63)	def. by	Sturt 12.12 (84)	Prospect Oval (crowd: 2,057)

=== Round 7 ===
	Round 7
Friday 26 May (7:20 pm)	Norwood 9.13 (67)	def.	Woodville-West Torrens 5.6 (36)	Norwood Oval (crowd: 2,941)
Saturday 27 May (2:10 pm)	Port Adelaide 17.16 (118)	def.	Central District 12.7 (79)	Adelaide Oval (crowd: 2,218)
Saturday 27 May (2:40 pm)	North Adelaide 5.5 (35)	def. by	Adelaide 17.7 (109)	Prospect Oval (crowd: 1,544)
Saturday 27 May (2:40 pm)	Glenelg 10.7 (67)	def.	West Adelaide 9.9 (63)	Glenelg Oval (crowd: 2,233)
Sunday 28 May (2:10 pm)	South Adelaide 5.11 (41)	def. by	Sturt 14.9 (93)	Hickinbotham Oval (crowd: 1,782)

=== Round 8 ===
	Round 8
Saturday 3 June (2:10 pm)	Sturt 21.9 (135)	def.	Norwood 11.11 (77)	Unley Oval (crowd: 3,851)
Saturday 3 June (2:10 pm)	West Adelaide 8.8 (56)	def. by	Central District 9.9 (63)	Richmond Oval (crowd: 1,801)
Saturday 3 June (2:40 pm)	Woodville-West Torrens 15.7 (97)	def.	North Adelaide 12.14 (86)	Woodville Oval (crowd: 1,842)
Saturday 3 June (2:40 pm)	Glenelg 14.4 (88)	def.	Adelaide 6.11 (47)	Glenelg Oval (crowd: 2,458)
Sunday 4 June (2:10 pm)	South Adelaide 12.5 (77)	def. by	Port Adelaide 19.13 (127)	Hickinbotham Oval

=== Round 9 ===
	Round 9
Saturday 10 June (2:10 pm)	Central District 10.6 (66)	def. by	Sturt 12.11 (83)	Elizabeth Oval (crowd: 2,427)
Saturday 10 June (2:40 pm)	Woodville-West Torrens 6.8 (44)	def.	South Adelaide 6.7 (43)	Woodville Oval (crowd: 1,837)
Saturday 10 June (4:10 pm)	Norwood 15.7 (97)	def. by	Adelaide 15.9 (99)	Norwood Oval (crowd: 3,323)
Sunday 11 June (2:10 pm)	Port Adelaide 28.14 (182)	def.	West Adelaide 7.12 (54)	Alberton Oval
Monday 12 June (2:10 pm)	North Adelaide 9.9 (63)	def. by	Glenelg 13.14 (92)	Prospect Oval (crowd: 2,356)

=== Round 10 ===
	Round 10 (Split Round)
Sunday 18 June (2:10 pm)	Sturt 14.8 (92)	def.	Port Adelaide 9.6 (60)	Unley Oval (crowd: 3,227)
Sunday 18 June (2:40 pm)	South Adelaide 8.12 (60)	def. by	Norwood 10.8 (68)	Hickinbotham Oval (crowd: 1,849)
Saturday 24 June (1:10 pm)	Glenelg 9.7 (61)	def. by	Woodville-West Torrens 12.9 (81)	Glenelg Oval (crowd: 2,485)
Saturday 24 June (2:10 pm)	Central District 9.11 (65)	def. by	Adelaide 16.5 (101)	Elizabeth Oval (crowd: 2,686)
Saturday 24 June (2:10 pm)	West Adelaide 15.13 (103)	def.	North Adelaide 13.5 (83)	Richmond Oval (crowd: 1,631)

=== Round 11 ===
	Round 11
Saturday 1 July (2:10 pm)	Central District 21.10 (136)	def.	Glenelg 6.3 (39)	Elizabeth Oval (crowd: 1,824)
Saturday 1 July (2:10 pm)	Woodville-West Torrens 12.13 (85)	def.	Port Adelaide 8.10 (58)	Woodville Oval (crowd: 1,786)
Saturday 1 July (2:10 pm)	North Adelaide 16.6 (102)	def.	South Adelaide 7.16 (58)	Prospect Oval (crowd: 1,486)
Saturday 1 July (2:10 pm)	Sturt 17.17 (119)	def.	Adelaide 10.7 (67)	Unley Oval (crowd: 2,290)
Saturday 1 July (2:10 pm)	Norwood 14.11 (95)	def. by	West Adelaide 14.15 (99)	Norwood Oval (crowd: 2,568)

=== Round 12 ===
	Round 12
Saturday 8 July (2:10 pm)	South Adelaide 13.5 (83)	def.	Central District 5.11 (41)	Hickinbotham Oval (crowd: 1,205)
Saturday 8 July (2:10 pm)	Sturt 13.3 (81)	def.	North Adelaide 6.9 (45)	Unley Oval (crowd: 1,967)
Saturday 8 July (2:10 pm)	West Adelaide 5.10 (40)	def. by	Woodville-West Torrens 11.19 (85)	Richmond Oval (crowd: 1,822)
Saturday 8 July (2:40 pm)	Port Adelaide 17.10 (112)	def.	Adelaide 8.6 (54)	Alberton Oval (crowd: 2,235)
Saturday 8 July (7:10 pm)	Glenelg 9.12 (66)	def. by	Norwood 17.5 (107)	Glenelg Oval (crowd: 1,898)

=== Round 13 ===
	Round 13
Saturday 15 July (1:40 pm)	North Adelaide 13.7 (85)	def. by	Norwood 15.11 (101)	Prospect Oval (crowd: 2,019)
Saturday 15 July (2:10 pm)	Central District 11.13 (79)	def.	Port Adelaide 10.3 (63)	Elizabeth Oval (crowd: 1,522)
Saturday 15 July (2:10 pm)	Glenelg 16.7 (103)	def.	South Adelaide 5.18 (48)	Glenelg Oval (crowd: 1,604)
Saturday 15 July (2:10 pm)	West Adelaide 14.13 (97)	def.	Adelaide 12.4 (76)	Richmond Oval (crowd: 1,359)
Sunday 16 July (2:10 pm)	Woodville-West Torrens 11.4 (70)	def.	Sturt 8.9 (57)	Woodville Oval (crowd: 2,171)

=== Round 14 ===
	Round 14
Saturday 22 July (1:40 pm)	Sturt 19.13 (127)	def.	Central District 14.12 (96)	Unley Oval (crowd: 2,368)
Saturday 22 July (2:10 pm)	North Adelaide 7.8 (50)	def. by	Woodville-West Torrens 11.14 (80)	Prospect Oval (crowd: 1,870)
Saturday 22 July (2:10 pm)	South Adelaide 8.6 (54)	def. by	West Adelaide 11.12 (78)	Hickinbotham Oval (crowd: 1,253)
Sunday 23 July (2:10 pm)	Norwood 13.13 (91)	def.	Adelaide 9.12 (66)	Norwood Oval (crowd: 2,679)
Sunday 23 July (2:10 pm)	Port Adelaide 16.12 (108)	def.	Glenelg 8.10 (58)	Alberton Oval (crowd: 2,109)

=== Round 15 ===
	Round 15
Saturday 29 July (2:10 pm)	Woodville-West Torrens 10.3 (63)	def. by	Norwood 13.19 (97)	Woodville Oval (crowd: 1,641)
Saturday 29 July (2:10 pm)	West Adelaide 5.6 (36)	def. by	Sturt 8.12 (60)	Richmond Oval (crowd: 1,645)
Saturday 29 July (2:10 pm)	Glenelg 13.8 (86)	def.	Adelaide 10.9 (69)	Bordertown Oval (crowd: 1,485)
Sunday 5 August (2:10 pm)	Central District 9.14 (68)	def.	North Adelaide 8.9 (57)	Elizabeth Oval (crowd: 1,514)
Sunday 5 August (2:40 pm)	Port Adelaide 12.11 (83)	def.	South Adelaide 7.9 (51)	Alberton Oval (crowd: 1,560)

=== Round 16 ===
	Round 16
Saturday 12 August (2:10 pm)	North Adelaide 12.4 (76)	def. by	Adelaide 17.13 (115)	Prospect Oval (crowd: 1,570)
Saturday 12 August (2:10 pm)	South Adelaide 21.15 (141)	def.	Woodville-West Torrens 9.4 (58)	Hickinbotham Oval (crowd: 1,438)
Saturday 12 August (2:10 pm)	Sturt 14.17 (101)	def.	Glenelg 7.10 (52)	Unley Oval (crowd: 2,092)
Saturday 12 August (2:10 pm)	West Adelaide 8.9 (57)	def. by	Port Adelaide 22.17 (149)	Richmond Oval (crowd: 1,912)
Saturday 12 August (2:40 pm)	Norwood 8.12 (60)	def. by	Central District 21.10 (136)	Norwood Oval (crowd: 2,435)

=== Round 17 ===
	Round 17
Saturday 19 August (2:10 pm)	Central District 15.16 (106)	def.	West Adelaide 7.10 (52)	Elizabeth Oval (crowd: 1,716)
Saturday 19 August (2:10 pm)	Glenelg 12.11 (83)	def. by	North Adelaide 15.9 (99)	Glenelg Oval (crowd: 2,680)
Saturday 19 August (2:10 pm)	Sturt 15.10 (100)	def.	South Adelaide 10.10 (70)	Unley Oval (crowd: 2,315)
Saturday 19 August (2:10 pm)	Woodville-West Torrens 10.8 (68)	def.	Adelaide 8.9 (57)	Woodville Oval (crowd: 4,677)
Sunday 20 August (2:10 pm)	Port Adelaide 19.8 (122)	def.	Norwood 8.3 (51)	Alberton Oval

=== Round 18 ===
	Round 18
Saturday 26 August (2:10 pm)	Woodville-West Torrens 6.13 (49)	def. by	Central District 10.9 (69)	Woodville Oval (crowd: 1,947)
Saturday 26 August (2:10 pm)	North Adelaide 10.6 (66)	def. by	Port Adelaide 15.16 (106)	Prospect Oval (crowd: 1,933)
Saturday 26 August (2:10 pm)	Norwood 11.10 (76)	drew with	Sturt 10.16 (76)	Norwood Oval (crowd: 3,382)
Saturday 26 August (2:10 pm)	South Adelaide 13.8 (86)	def.	Adelaide 12.10 (82)	Hickinbotham Oval (crowd: 1,339)
Saturday 26 August (2:10 pm)	West Adelaide 14.8 (92)	def.	Glenelg 12.7 (79)	Richmond Oval (crowd: 1,938)

== Ladder ==
Pos	Team	Pld	W	L	D	PF	PA	PP	Pts
1	Woodville-West Torrens	18	14	4	0	1379	1132	54.92	28
2	Port Adelaide	18	13	5	0	1834	1226	59.93	26
3	Sturt (P)	18	12	5	1	1535	1263	54.86	25
4	Norwood	18	10	7	1	1539	1482	50.94	21
5	Central District	18	8	10	0	1477	1433	50.76	16
6	South Adelaide	18	8	10	0	1314	1404	48.34	16
7	Glenelg	18	8	10	0	1372	1535	47.20	16
8	Adelaide	18	7	11	0	1359	1527	47.09	14
9	West Adelaide	18	5	13	0	1210	1666	42.07	10
10	North Adelaide	18	4	14	0	1280	1631	43.97	8

Source: australianfootball.com
Rules for classification: 1) points; 2) percentage; 3) number of points for.
(P) Premiers

== Finals series ==
=== Qualifying and Elimination Finals ===
	Elimination Final
Saturday 2 September (12:10 pm)	Norwood 10.7 (67)	def. by	Central District 17.13 (115)	Adelaide Oval (crowd: 10,429)

	Qualifying Final
Saturday 2 September (3:10 pm)	Port Adelaide 13.11 (89)	def.	Sturt 11.8 (74)	Adelaide Oval (crowd: 10,429)

=== Semi-finals ===
	First Semi-final
Sunday 10 September (12:10 pm)	Sturt 13.8 (86)	def.	Central District 11.13 (79)	Adelaide Oval (crowd: 9,029)

	Second Semi-final
Sunday 10 September (3:10 pm)	Woodville-West Torrens 5.10 (40)	def. by	Port Adelaide 10.13 (73)	Adelaide Oval (crowd: 9,029)

=== Preliminary final ===
	Preliminary Final
Sunday 17 September (2:10 pm)	Woodville-West Torrens 8.5 (53)	def. by	Sturt 11.7 (73)	Adelaide Oval (crowd: 7,332)

=== Grand Final ===
2017 SANFL Grand Final
Sunday 24 September (2:40 pm)	Port Adelaide	def. by	Sturt	Adelaide Oval (crowd: 39,813)
2.3 (15); 3.4 (22); 3.7 (25); 7.7 (49)	Q1; Q2; Q3; Final	4.1 (25); 5.4 (34); 6.6 (42); 7.8 (50)	Umpires: Corey Bowen, Toby Medlin, Giles Lewis; Jack Oatey Medal: Fraser Evans (Sturt); Television broadcast: Seven Network
Neade 2, T. Gray 2, Ah Chee 2, Lobbe 1	Goals	Beard 2, M. Evans, Hone, Harms, Sutcliffe, Riley 1
Ah Chee, Toumpas, Neade, Snelling, Summerton, Atley, Bonner	Best	F. Evans, Stephens, Kirkwood, Riley, Battersby, McMahon, Sumner,
The attendance of 39,813 was the highest crowd for an SANFL Grand Final since 1998, which was played by the same teams.

== Awards and premiers ==
=== Awards ===
- The Magarey Medal (awarded to the best and fairest player in the home and away season) was won by Mitch Grigg of Norwood, who polled 23 votes.
- The Ken Farmer Medal (awarded to the leading goalkicker in the home and away season) was won by Brett Eddy of Port Adelaide. He kicked 53 goals in the 2017 home and away season.
- The Stanley H. Lewis Memorial Trophy was won by Woodville-West Torrens, with 2325 points, which was 125 points ahead of second-place Sturt. It was the Eagles' 6th trophy having previously won in 1993, 2000, 2013, 2015 and 2016.
- The R.O. Shearman Medal (awarded to the player adjudged best by the 10 SANFL club coaches each game) was won by Joel Cross of South Adelaide.
- Woodville-West Torrens were the league minor premiers, finishing top of the ladder at the end of the home and away season with 14 wins and four losses. It was the club's 7th minor premiership in the SANFL and their 3rd in succession.

=== Premiers ===
- Sturt were the League premiers, defeating Port Adelaide by 1 point.
- Sturt were the Reserves premiers, defeating West Adelaide by 15 points.
- Sturt were the Under 18 premiers, defeating Woodville-West Torrens by 43 points.
