= Lachlan Gollant =

Personal information
- Nickname: Squiggy
- Born: 12 September 2001 (age 25)
- Original team: St Bernard's Football Club (Victorian Amateur Football Association) / Calder Cannons (TAC Cup)
- Draft: No. 48, 2019 national draft
- Height: 191 cm (6 ft 3 in)
- Weight: 85 kg (187 lb)
- Position: Forward/Midfield

Club information
- Current club: North Melbourne (reserves)
- Number: 55

Playing career^{1}
Years	Club	Games (Goals)
2021–2024	Adelaide	16 (13)
- ^{1} Playing statistics correct to the end of 2024.

Career highlights
- SANFL: 2x Adelaide (SANFL) leading goalkicker: 2023, 2024; Neil Kerley Trophy: 2024

Lachlan Gollant (born 12 September 2001) is an Australian rules footballer who currently plays for the Williamstown Football Club in the Victorian Football League (VFL). He previously played for Adelaide in the Australian Football League (AFL) after being selected with the 48th pick of the 2019 national draft.

== Early life ==
Gollant, a Melbourne native, attended Penleigh and Essendon Grammar School. He is a great-nephew of former North Melbourne captain Vic Lawrence and his biological played for North Melbourne at under-19s level.

A Calder Cannons recruit, Gollant was selected by Adelaide with the 48th pick of the 2019 national draft.

== AFL career ==
Gollant made his league debut in the final home and away round of the 2021 AFL season. In the first Showdown of 2022, Gollant kicked a career best four goals in Adelaide's after-the-siren win over Port Adelaide.

For the second consecutive year, Gollant was Adelaide's leading goalkicker in the SANFL in 2024. His season included an eight-goal game against West Adelaide, for which he was awarded with the Neil Kerley Trophy, given to the player best on ground in that fixture. Gollant's performance was rewarded with a promotion to the AFL squad in round 23, replacing the injured Taylor Walker.

Despite good SANFL form, an inability to produce form at senior level resulted in Gollant being delisted by Adelaide following the 2024 season. He signed for Williamstown in the Victorian Football League (VFL) following his delisting.

== Statistics ==
Legend
G	Goals	K	Kicks	D	Disposals	T	Tackles
B	Behinds	H	Handballs	M	Marks

Season	Team	No.	Games	Totals							Averages (per game)							Votes
Season	Team	No.	Games	G	B	K	H	D	M	T	G	B	K	H	D	M	T	Votes
2020 (Note: The 2020 season was played with 17 home-and-away matches per team (down from 22) and 16-minute quarters with time on (down from 20-minute quarters with time on) due to the impact of the COVID-19 pandemic.)	Adelaide	44	0	—	—	—	—	—	—	—	—	—	—	—	—	—	—	0
2021	Adelaide	44	1	1	1	7	4	11	3	1	1.0	1.0	7.0	4.0	11.0	3.0	1.0	0
2022	Adelaide	44	7	7	6	36	17	53	23	5	1.0	0.9	5.1	2.4	7.6	3.3	0.7	0
2023	Adelaide	44	4	4	6	28	10	38	16	7	1.0	1.5	7.0	2.5	9.5	4.0	1.8	0
2024	Adelaide	44	4	1	1	15	7	22	3	3	0.3	0.3	3.8	1.8	5.5	0.8	0.8	0
2025	Adelaide	44	0	—	—	—	—	—	—	—	—	—	—	—	—	—	—	0
Career			16	13	14	86	38	124	45	16	0.8	0.9	5.4	2.4	7.8	2.8	1.0	0
