= Lachlan McAndrew =

Australian rules footballer (born 2000)

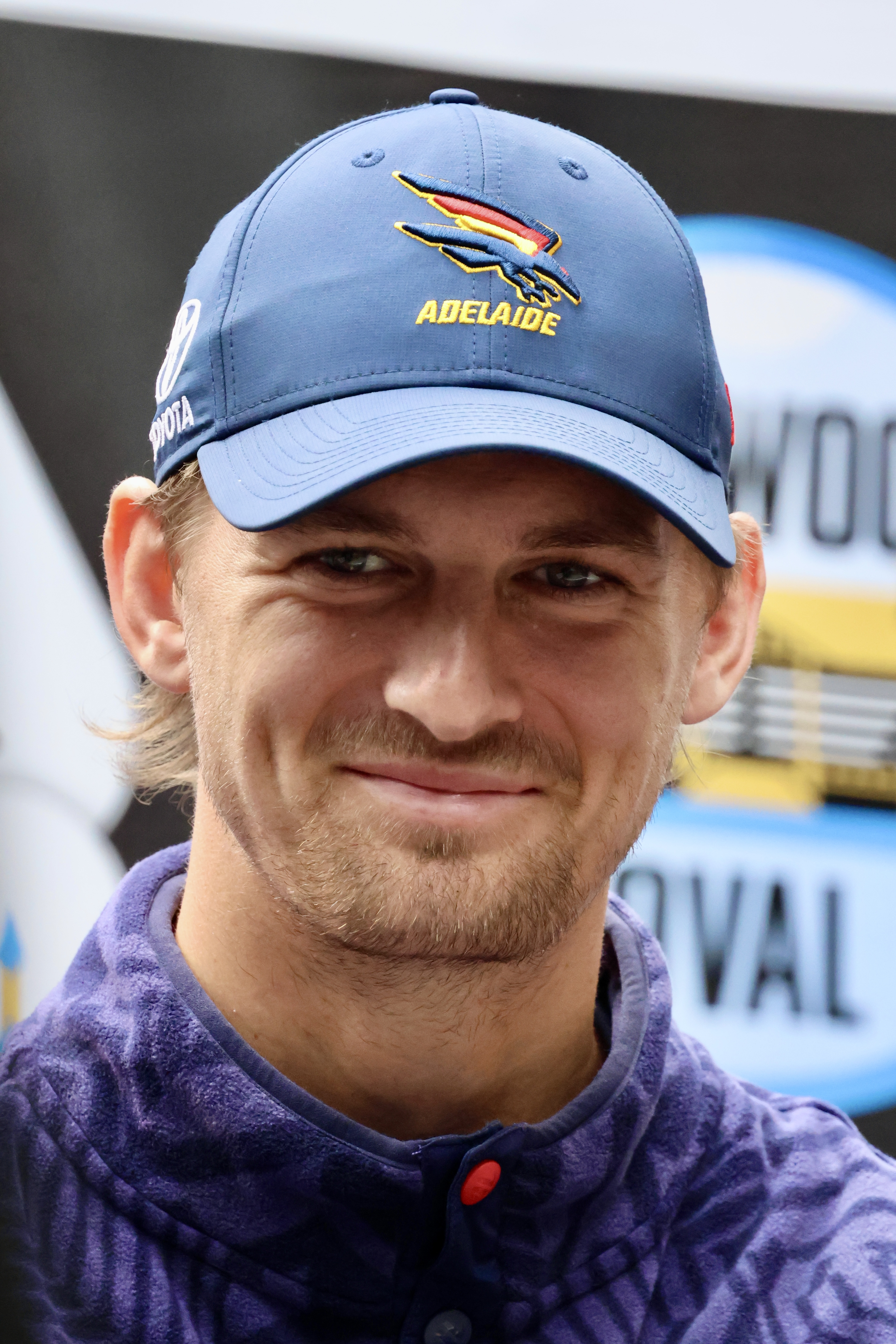
- McAndrew at the 2026 Gather Round

Personal information
- Nickname: Stretch
- Born: 26 May 2000 (age 26)
- Original teams: Sydney (VFL); Manly-Warringah (AFL Sydney)
- Draft: No. 12, 2021 mid-season rookie draft
- Debut: Round 10, 2023, Sydney vs. North Melbourne, at Docklands Stadium
- Height: 210 cm (6 ft 11 in)
- Position: Ruckman

Club information
- Current club: Adelaide
- Number: 42

Playing career^{1}
Years	Club	Games (Goals)
2021–2024	Sydney	2 (0)
2025–	Adelaide	24 (6)
Total		26 (7)
- ^{1} Playing statistics correct to the end of round 22, 2026.

Lachlan McAndrew is an Australian rules footballer who plays for the Adelaide Football Club in the Australian Football League (AFL). He previously played for the Sydney Swans.

== Early life ==
Growing up in Sydney, New South Wales, McAndrew played rugby union at a young age. He switched codes to Australian rules football and played for his school, St Augustine's College, before he played club football for Manly-Warringah in the AFL Sydney local league.

McAndrew eventually signed for the Sydney Swans Academy program, through which he earned a spot on their Victorian Football League (VFL) list only two years after his code switch. He was drafted to the AFL by the Swans in the 2021 mid-season rookie draft at age 21.

== AFL career ==
=== Sydney ===
The tall Swan didn't play AFL football in his first few years on the rookie list. Prior to the 2023 season, both Sydney ruckmen Tom Hickey and Peter Ladhams struggled with injury, making McAndrew's debut seem likely for round one. Despite performing well in practice matches against Brisbane Lions and Carlton, McAndrew ultimately had to wait until round 10 to make his debut. His first AFL game came against North Melbourne at Docklands Stadium, and held his own against veteran ruck Todd Goldstein, collecting 20 hit-outs and 9 disposals. McAndrew also played the following week against Carlton, but ultimately was out-performed as he played alongside premier Sydney ruck Hickey.

With Sydney's signing of All-Australian ruckman Brodie Grundy from Melbourne in the 2023 trade period, McAndrew once again fell out of favour at the Swans. He didn't play an AFL game in 2024 AFL season, and after four seasons with Sydney, he was delisted following the club's 2024 grand final loss.

=== Adelaide ===
McAndrew signed with Adelaide's South Australian National Football League (SANFL) squad after his departure from Sydney. When Adelaide's back-up ruck Kieran Strachan injured his foot, McAndrew was invited to train with the AFL squad over the 2024–2025 pre-season. He performed well in Adelaide's internal trial match, and when Strachan was placed on the inactive list for his long-term injury, the Adelaide Crows signed McAndrew as a rookie through the pre-season supplemental selection period.

McAndrew, despite performing very well in the SANFL, could not earn a senior club debut due to the strong form of first-choice ruck Reilly O'Brien. Despite not yet playing an AFL game for the club, in June 2025, McAndrew received a two-year contract extension from the Crows. He was selected in the South Australian National Football League (SANFL) Team of the Year as the primary ruck, and Adelaide's list manager Justin Reid confirmed that McAndrew was a part of the club's plan moving forward.

He made his club debut in the round one, 2026 win against Collingwood in which he dominated centre clearances against Darcy Cameron and provided the game-sealing goal assist to Ben Keays. After a breakout season in which he played 24 of a possible 25 games, McAndrew was the runner-up in the Malcolm Blight Medal.

== Statistics ==
Updated to the end of round 22, 2026.

Legend
G	Goals	K	Kicks	D	Disposals	T	Tackles
B	Behinds	H	Handballs	M	Marks	H/O	Hit-outs

Season	Team	No.	Games	Totals								Averages (per game)								Votes
Season	Team	No.	Games	G	B	K	H	D	M	T	H/O	G	B	K	H	D	M	T	H/O	Votes
2021	Sydney	46	0	—	—	—	—	—	—	—	—	—	—	—	—	—	—	—	—	0
2022	Sydney	46	0	—	—	—	—	—	—	—	—	—	—	—	—	—	—	—	—	0
2023	Sydney	46	2	0	1	4	8	12	2	6	27	0.0	0.5	2.0	4.0	6.0	1.0	3.0	13.5	0
2024	Sydney	46	0	—	—	—	—	—	—	—	—	—	—	—	—	—	—	—	—	0
2025	Adelaide	42	0	—	—	—	—	—	—	—	—	—	—	—	—	—	—	—	—	0
2026	Adelaide	42	20	6	3	110	122	232	47	98	633	0.3	0.2	5.5	6.1	11.6	2.4	4.9	31.7	0
Career			22	6	4	114	130	244	49	104	660	0.3	0.2	5.2	5.9	11.1	2.2	4.7	30.0	0
