= Reilly O'Brien =

Australian rules footballer (born 1995)

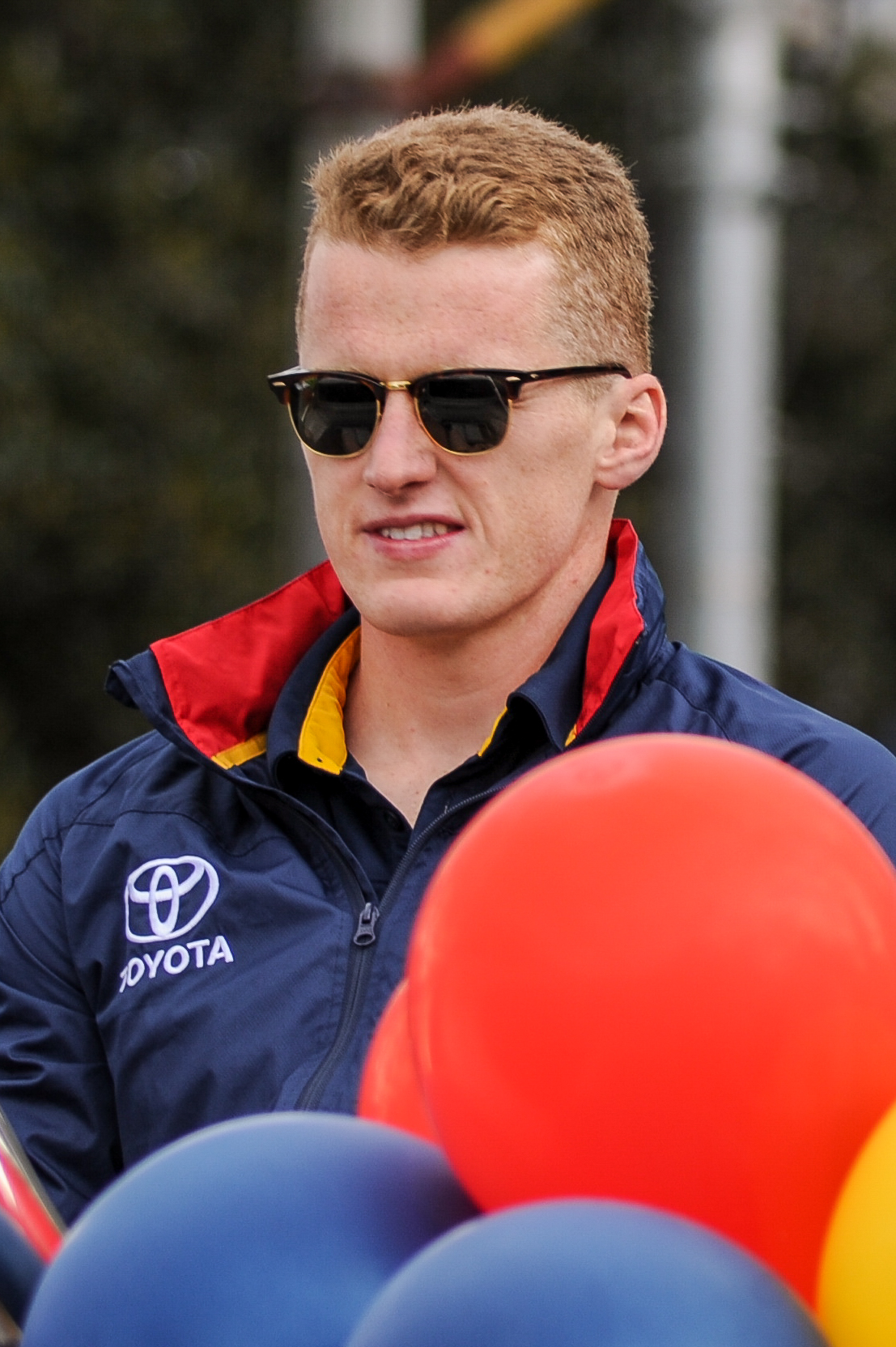
- O'Brien in September 2017

Personal information
- Full name: Reilly Mark O'Brien
- Nickname: ROB
- Born: 20 August 1995 (age 31)
- Original team: Calder Cannons (TAC Cup)
- Draft: No. 9, 2014 rookie draft
- Debut: Round 20, 2016, Adelaide vs. Brisbane Lions, at Adelaide Oval
- Height: 202 cm (6 ft 8 in)
- Weight: 102 kg (225 lb)
- Position: Ruck

Club information
- Current club: Adelaide
- Number: 43

Playing career^{1}
Years	Club	Games (Goals)
2015–	Adelaide	148 (17)
- ^{1} Playing statistics correct to the end of 2026.

Career highlights
- Malcolm Blight Medal: 2020; Jim Stynes Award: 2024

Reilly Mark O'Brien (born 20 August 1995) is an Australian rules footballer playing for the Adelaide Football Club in the Australian Football League (AFL). A Malcolm Blight Medal winner in 2020, he is currently Adelaide's second-choice ruckman.

== Early life ==
O'Brien participated in the Auskick programs at Flemington Primary School in Flemington, Victoria, and at Moonee Valley Football Club. He played his junior representative football with the Calder Cannons in the TAC Cup. He grew up in the Melbourne suburb of Ascot Vale.

O'Brien was drafted by the Adelaide Football Club with their first selection and ninth overall in the 2014 rookie draft.

== AFL career ==
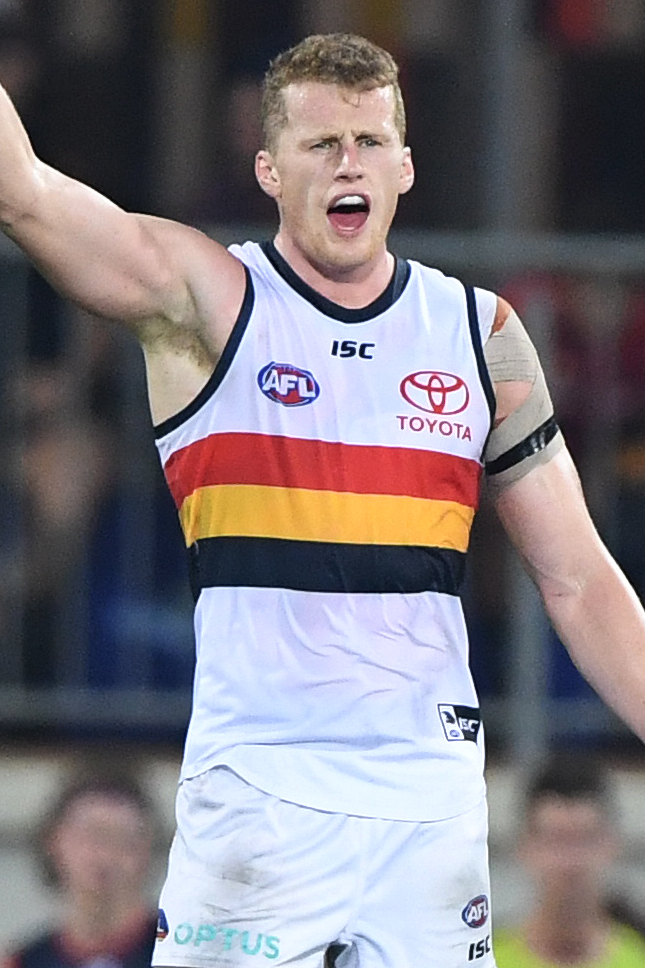
O'Brien playing for Adelaide in 2019

Reilly O'Brien made his debut in the 138-point win against the Brisbane Lions in round 20, 2016, at the Adelaide Oval. He didn't play much football between 2016 and 2019, but broke into the side after Sam Jacobs sustained an injury. Jacobs was traded to Greater Western Sydney at the end of the 2019 AFL season, leaving O'Brien as Adelaide's primary ruckman going into the 2020 AFL season.

O'Brien faced controversy when he accidentally tweeted that West Coast ruckman Nic Naitanui is "lazy and unfit", attributing the mistake to a broken smartphone. Naitanui responded by gifting O'Brien a new phone after that weekend's game between their clubs.

O'Brien won the Malcolm Blight Medal in his first season as the primary ruck. This led to a contract extension to keep him at Adelaide until 2025.

In 2023, with Riley Thilthorpe as his backup ruckman, O'Brien led the competition for hit-outs. Partway through 2024, the struggling Crows chose to drop O'Brien to the SANFL in favour of Kieran Strachan in an attempt to revive the club's season. O'Brien returned after two games on the sidelines, and he still led the competition for hit-outs and average hit-outs by the conclusion of the season.

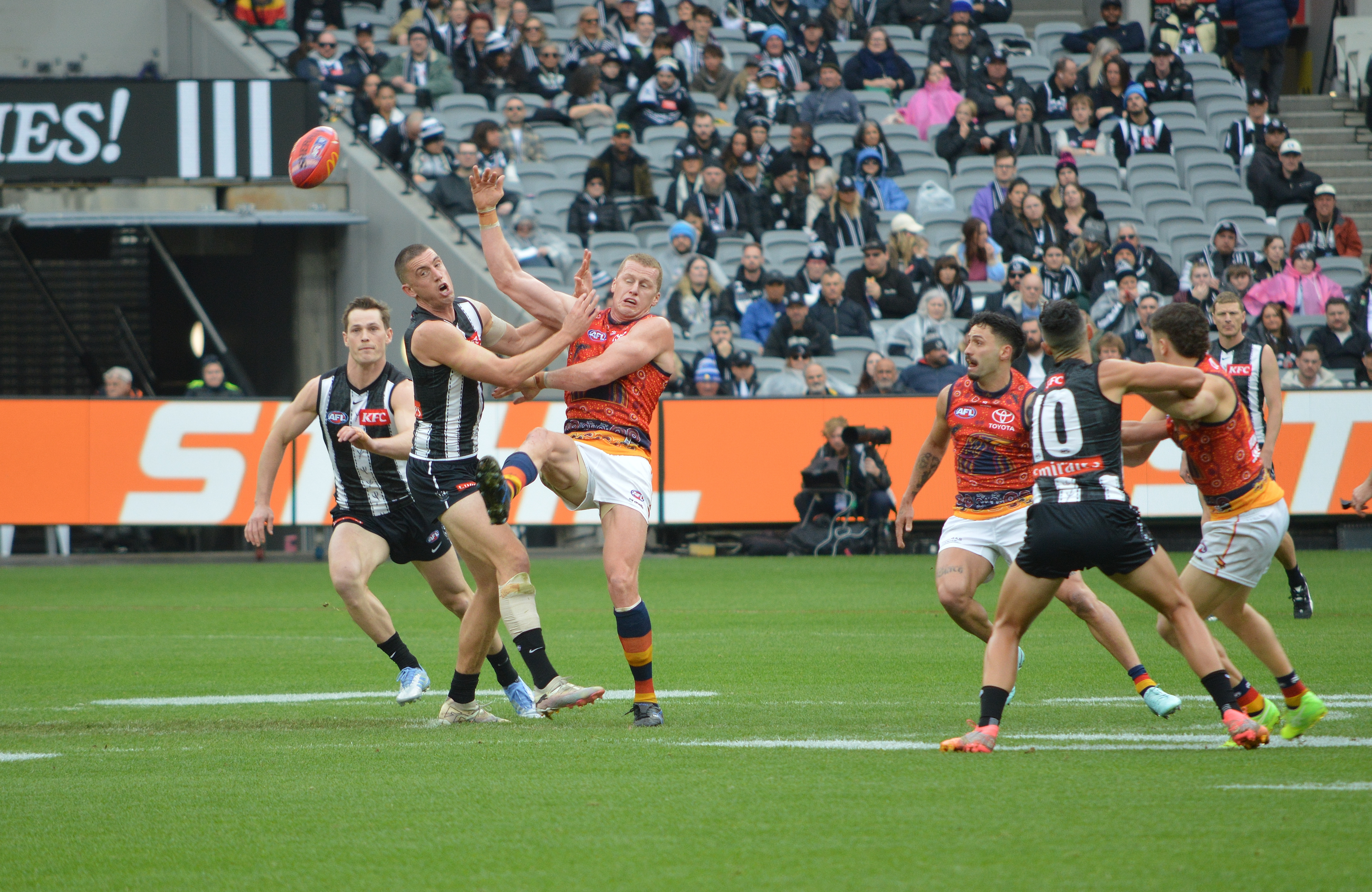
O'Brien and Darcy Cameron compete at a stoppage in a 2025 match against Collingwood

In 2025, O'Brien played every game and led his team to the minor premiership as a vice-captain, and played all 25 games for the Crows. However, O'Brien was stripped of his leadership role in 2026 as he fell out of favour, playing only one game in the first half of the season. Ruckman Lachlan McAndrew became Adelaide's first-choice ruckmen following a rule change involving the ruck contest at a center stoppage.

== Personal life ==
Outside of football, O’Brien has completed a medical science degree at Flinders University. He has since undertaken post graduate study, both in business administration and public health through Torrens University. He has also completed postgraduate study in neuroscience through King’s College. O’Brien graduated from high school with an ATAR of 99.75.

In 2024, O'Brien won the league-wide Jim Stynes Community Leadership Award for his advocacy and community work for mental health in South Australia. After achieving automatic eligibility by playing 100 games over 10 years, O'Brien was granted Life Membership with the Adelaide Football Club.

In May 2026, O'Brien and wife Chloe announced that they are expected the birth of their first child.

== Statistics ==
Updated to the end of round 22, 2026.

Legend
G	Goals	K	Kicks	D	Disposals	T	Tackles
B	Behinds	H	Handballs	M	Marks	H/O	Hit-outs

Season	Team	No.	Games	Totals								Averages (per game)								Votes
Season	Team	No.	Games	G	B	K	H	D	M	T	H/O	G	B	K	H	D	M	T	H/O	Votes
2015	Adelaide	43	0	—	—	—	—	—	—	—	—	—	—	—	—	—	—	—	—	0
2016	Adelaide	43	2	1	2	9	19	28	4	6	47	0.5	1.0	4.5	9.5	14.0	2.0	3.0	23.5	0
2017	Adelaide	43	0	—	—	—	—	—	—	—	—	—	—	—	—	—	—	—	—	0
2018	Adelaide	43	0	—	—	—	—	—	—	—	—	—	—	—	—	—	—	—	—	0
2019	Adelaide	43	18	2	4	126	150	276	60	77	597	0.1	0.2	7.0	8.3	15.3	3.3	4.3	33.2	3
2020 (Note: The 2020 season was played with 17 home-and-away matches per team (down from 22) and 16-minute quarters with time on (down from 20-minute quarters with time on) due to the impact of the COVID-19 pandemic.)	Adelaide	43	17	0	3	107	125	232	64	68	462	0.0	0.2	6.3	7.4	13.6	3.8	4.0	27.2	4
2021	Adelaide	43	20	2	0	138	156	294	71	55	585	0.1	0.0	6.9	7.8	14.7	3.6	2.8	29.3	5
2022	Adelaide	43	20	3	2	124	141	265	53	79	738	0.2	0.1	6.2	7.1	13.3	2.7	4.0	36.9	2
2023	Adelaide	43	23	4	4	117	169	286	66	72	888^{†}	0.2	0.2	5.1	7.3	12.4	2.9	3.1	38.6	3
2024	Adelaide	43	21	2	3	132	110	242	49	77	898^{†}	0.1	0.1	6.3	5.2	11.5	2.3	3.7	42.8	2
2025	Adelaide	43	25	3	3	159	141	300	75	88	972	0.1	0.1	6.4	5.6	12.0	3.0	3.5	38.9	5
2026	Adelaide	43	2	0	0	7	7	14	6	6	50	0.0	0.0	3.5	3.5	7.0	3.0	3.0	25.0	0
Career			148	17	21	919	1018	1937	448	528	5237	0.1	0.1	6.2	6.9	13.1	3.0	3.6	35.4	24

== Honours and achievements ==
Team

- AFL minor premiership (Adelaide): 2025

Individual

- Adelaide vice-captain: 2024–2025
- Malcolm Blight Medal: 2020
- Jim Stynes Award: 2024
- Member's MVP Award (Adelaide): 2020
- 3× Phil Walsh Best Team Man Award (Adelaide): 2022, 2023, 2024
- 2× Foundation Community Leadership Award (Adelaide): 2023, 2024
