= Blake Drury =

Australian rules footballer

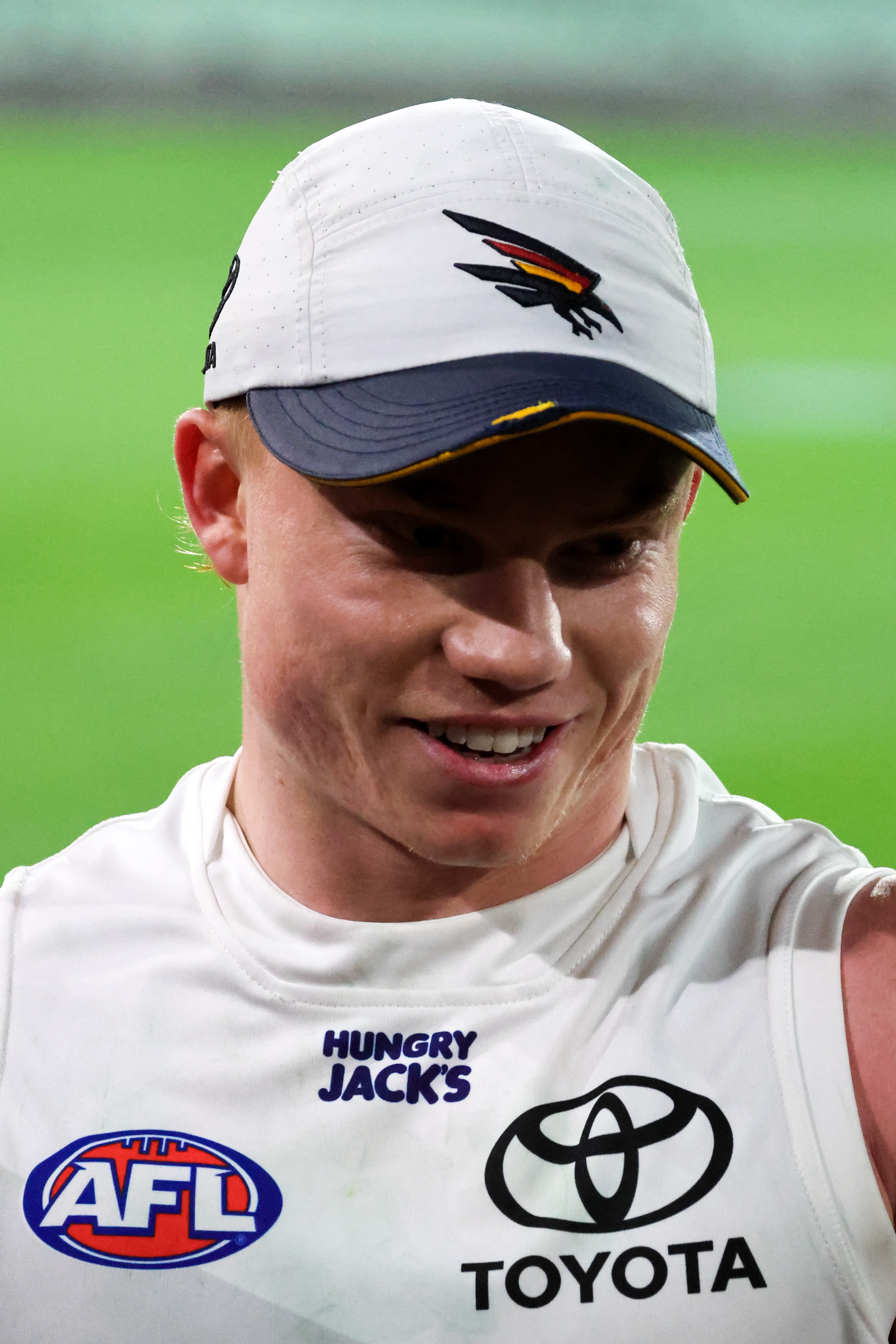
- Drury with Adelaide in 2026

Personal information
- Full name: Blake Drury
- Born: 11 January 2004 (age 22)
- Original teams: Oakleigh Chargers (Talent League); Vermont Eagles (EFNL)
- Draft: No. 1, 2023 rookie draft: North Melbourne
- Debut: Round 8, 2023, North Melbourne vs. St Kilda, at Docklands
- Height: 177 cm (5 ft 10 in)
- Weight: 74 kg (163 lb)
- Position: Forward

Club information
- Current club: Norwood

Playing career^{1}
| Years | Club | Games (Goals) |
| 2023–2024 | North Melbourne | 10 (3) |
| 2025–2026 | Adelaide (reserves) | 37 (45) |
| 2027– | Norwood | 0 (0) |
- ^{1} Playing statistics correct to the end of 2026.

Blake Drury (born 11 January 2004) is an Australian rules footballer who played for the North Melbourne Football Club in the Australian Football League (AFL). He currently plays with the Norwood Football Club in the South Australian National Football League (SANFL).

== AFL career ==
=== North Melbourne (2023–2024) ===
Drury was recruited by North Melbourne with the 1st overall selection in the 2022 rookie draft.

Drury debuted for North Melbourne in round eight of the 2023 AFL season in a 30-point loss to St Kilda. He kicked two goals along with 11 marks and 17 disposals in a career-best performance against Geelong in round six, 2024. The forward played the following four matches before being omitted until the final game of the season.

After ten winless games for the struggling Kangaroos, Drury was delisted at the end of the 2024 season.

== Post-AFL career ==
=== Adelaide reserves (2025–2026) ===
Drury was signed by the Adelaide Football Club in the SANFL ahead of the 2025 SANFL season. Rewarded with his good form early in the season, he earned a selection into the SANFL's State Squad set to take on the West Australian Football League's representative squad. In the 2026 SANFL season, Drury became Adelaide's most prolific goalscorer, kicking 31 goals from 18 matches. He was named in the SANFL Team of the Year and won Adelaide's best and fairest award, but departed the club at the conclusion of the season.

==== Scandal ====
In May 2025, in the lead-up to the South Australia versus Western Australia representative match, Drury made offensive comments to a woman alongside Central District player Aiden Grace at a promotional photoshoot. As a result, both players were suspended from featuring in the match.

=== Norwood (2027–present) ===
In October 2026, Drury signed with reigning SANFL premiers Norwood.

== Statistics ==
Updated to the end of the 2025 season.

Legend
| G | Goals | K | Kicks | D | Disposals | T | Tackles |
| B | Behinds | H | Handballs | M | Marks |

| Season | Team | No. | Games | Totals | | | | | | | Averages (per game) | | | | | | | Votes |
| Season | Team | No. | Games | G | B | K | H | D | M | T | G | B | K | H | D | M | T | Votes |
|---|---|---|---|---|---|---|---|---|---|---|---|---|---|---|---|---|---|---|
| 2023 | North Melbourne | 41 | 4 | 0 | 2 | 14 | 15 | 29 | 5 | 5 | 0.0 | 0.5 | 3.5 | 3.8 | 7.3 | 1.3 | 1.3 | 0 |
| 2024 | North Melbourne | 41 | 6 | 3 | 0 | 37 | 24 | 61 | 24 | 7 | 0.5 | 0.0 | 6.2 | 4.0 | 10.2 | 4.0 | 1.2 | 0 |
| Career | | | 10 | 3 | 2 | 51 | 39 | 90 | 29 | 12 | 0.3 | 0.2 | 5.1 | 3.9 | 9.0 | 2.9 | 1.2 | 0 |
