= Ian Callinan (footballer) =

Australian rules footballer (born 1982)

Personal information
- Full name: Ian Callinan
- Born: 20 December 1982 (age 43)
- Original team: Clarence (TSL)
- Draft: No. 64, 2010 Rookie Draft, Adelaide
- Height: 172 cm (5 ft 8 in)
- Weight: 74 kg (163 lb)
- Position: Small Forward/ Wingman

Club information
- Current club: Adelaide Football Club SANFL
- Number: 37

Playing career^{1}
Years	Club	Games (Goals)
2001–2006	Tasmanian Devils	109 (153)
2007–2013	Central District	95 (175)
2011–2013	Adelaide	32 (49)
2014–2015	Adelaide Football Club (SANFL)	34 (42)
Total		270 (419)
- ^{1} Playing statistics correct to the end of 2013.

Career highlights
- J. J. Liston Trophy (2005); Tas. Statewide League Premiership Player (Clarence: 2000); SANFL Premiership Player (Centrals: 2007, 2008, 2009, 2010); Jack Oatey Medal (2010); Central District best and fairest (2007, 2010); Tasmanian Devils best and fairest (2005); Hunter-Harrison Medal (2000); Under-18 All-Australian team (2000)

Ian Callinan (born 20 December 1982) is a former professional Australian rules footballer in the Australian Football League, playing with the Adelaide Crows. He was the league's smallest player during his career, standing at only 172 cm. He played as both a midfielder and a small forward during his career.

== Playing career ==
=== Junior ===
Callinan played his junior football in Tasmania, initially at Rokeby, before joining Lauderdale as an Under-16 and Clarence as an Under-18. He regularly represented Tasmania in junior representative football, most notably in the AFL National Under-18s championships in 2000, where he won the Hunter-Harrison Medal as the tournament's Division Two best and fairest, and was selected in the Under-18 All-Australian team as a forward pocket. Callinan nominated for 2000 AFL draft, but was not selected.

=== State level ===
Callinan first played senior football for Clarence and was a member of that club's Tasmanian State League premiership winning team in 2000. The next season, he was recruited to play for the new Tasmanian Devils Football Club in the Victorian Football League. Callinan became one of the stars of the league, and in 2005 he won the J. J. Liston Trophy (in a tie with Paul Johnson of Sandringham) as the league's best and fairest, as well as the club best and fairest. He played more than 100 games with the Devils between 2001 and 2006.

In 2007, Callinan moved to Central District in the South Australian National Football League (SANFL). In four seasons with Central Districts, Callinan won four premierships (2007, 2008, 2009 and 2010), winning the Jack Oatey Medal as best on ground in the 2010 Grand Final, and two club best and fairest awards (2007, 2010). He was also Centrals leading goalkicker in 2007 and 2010.

=== Professional career ===
In 2011, Callinan was recruited to the AFL as a rookie by the Adelaide Football Club, with a fourth round draft pick in the 2011 AFL rookie draft (No. 64 overall). He had undergone pre-season training with at least four different AFL clubs during his career, but this was the first time he was recruited. After a biceps injury in a pre-season match sidelined him for half of the season, he made his AFL debut at age 28 in Round 14, 2011, against Geelong, and played a total of three AFL matches for the season. He continued to play for Centrals when on reserve for Adelaide. Callinan played 32 senior games over three seasons for the Crows before being delisted at the end of 2013.

In 2014, Callinan became the inaugural captain of the Adelaide Crows reserves team, which was entering the SANFL that season, also taking an assistant development coaching role in the team, serving in the role until the end of 2015. He returned to Tasmania and played for Clarence in 2016.

== Personal life ==
Before playing football professionally, Callinan earned his living as an Air Conditioning Installer. Callinan is married to Lauren (née James), daughter of former All-Australian Sandy Bay footballer Des James. The couple has three children, sons Jack and Harry and daughter Gracie.
