= Adelaide Football Club (SANFL) =

Names
- Full name: Adelaide Football Club Limited, trading as Adelaide Crows
- Nickname(s): Crows, Crows Reserves, Whites, White Noise, West Lakes Boys; Indigenous rounds: Kuwarna

2026 season
- After finals: DNQ
- Home-and-away season: 7th
- Leading goalkicker: Blake Drury (31)
- Best and fairest: Blake Drury

Club details
- Founded: 1991 (AFL establishment); 2014 (SANFL entry)
- Colours: Navy blue, red, gold
- Competition: South Australian National Football League
- Coach: Michael Godden
- Captain: Kieran Strachan
- Ground: Adelaide Oval (53,500)

Uniforms
Home	Away

Other information
- Official website: afc.com.au/SANFL

The Adelaide Football Club, nicknamed the Crows, is an Australian rules football reserves team which competes in the South Australian National Football League (SANFL). Though the Adelaide Football Club was formed in 1990 for the national AFL competition, it was not until 2014 that the club was granted a license to field a dedicated reserves team in the SANFL.

== History ==
The Adelaide Football Club was created in the court room doing bid against port Adelaide football club in 1990 as part of the Australian Football League's expansion into non-Victorian areas. The club first competed in the 1991 AFL season, finishing a respectable ninth on the ladder at the end of the season before first competing in a finals series in 1993.

From 2011, Adelaide club officials began expressing genuine interest in the formation of a stand-alone reserves side in the SANFL competition, rather than continuing with the draft policy which resulted in Adelaide-listed players being released to SANFL clubs when not selected for the AFL team. Originally, considerable opposition from the SANFL clubs and the South Australia Football Commission resulted in the club being denied a SANFL licence; Chairperson John Olsen contending such a change would "compromise the SANFL competition" as well as have a negative impact on league depth, talent, competitiveness and gate takings.

In response, Adelaide made it clear that it intended to establish a stand-alone reserves team from 2014, and that it was prepared to field the team in the South Australian Amateur Football League or in another state if the SANFL continued to refuse it entry. Following improved negotiations between Adelaide executives and SANFL clubs, the Crows' bid for a SANFL stand-alone side was approved by a vote of 6-2 of club executive representatives in August 2013. The 15-year agreement results in Adelaide being required to pay an annual licence fee of $400,000 and commitments to retain the integrity of the SANFL, including an agreement not to rest players.

Adelaide's first SANFL premiership match was against North Adelaide on April 6, 2014.

Between 2021 and 2024, coach Michael Godden took the club to two preliminary finals, but without a Grand Final appearance, was replaced by Matthew Wright for the 2025 SANFL season.

== Club structure ==
As part of the formation of a stand-alone Adelaide Crows team in the SANFL, several points of agreement were made to apply to the club once it began competing from 2014:

- Adelaide SANFL team to be branded Adelaide Football Club
- All Adelaide Football Club listed players (including Rookie listed) to play with Adelaide SANFL team should they not be selected in the AFL team.
- SANFL Clubs can opt in / out of providing top up players to Adelaide.
- Should SANFL Clubs chose to opt in, they agree to always have a minimum of 2 players available for selection for Adelaide.
- These players will be: 18 – 22 years old and on a SANFL Club list.
- Should it be necessary, Adelaide may access further ‘top up’ players from community football. These players are not to have played at SANFL level for a minimum of 18 months and will receive $400 per match.
- Adelaide players are eligible to win the Magarey Medal.
- Adelaide players not eligible for State Game representation.

Ahead of the 2015 season, SANFL executives outlined additional new measures in relation to Adelaide's player list:

- To be eligible for inclusion on the AFC Supplementary ('top up' players) List, a person must be under the age of 23...a player may play as a top-up player past the age of 23 as long as he is first listed prior to the age of 23. Adelaide will be able to retain current contracted players already over the age of 23.
- AFC cannot contract 'top up' players for more than one year.
- Players included on the list of AFC cannot be recruited from outside of South Australia.
- Adelaide no longer permitted to include players from rival SANFL clubs, with all top-up players to be recruited from Community football clubs.

=== Minor round matches ===
The Crows are permitted the use of one home game from its two annual matches against the Port Adelaide reserves team (nicknamed the Port Adelaide Magpies). However, as part of the agreement allowing Adelaide to field a stand-alone team in the SANFL, the Crows are required to play all other regular season games at the home ground of their opponents. The only exception to this was the Round 15 2016 match, when it hosted Sturt at Thebarton.

==== List of home grounds ====
Years	Venue	Location	Notes
2014	Clare Oval	Clare	SANFL Showdown I
2015	Balaklava Oval	Balaklava	SANFL Showdown III
2016	Mannum Oval	Mannum	SANFL Showdown V
2016	Thebarton Oval	Thebarton	Vs. Sturt
2017	Woodville Oval	Woodville	SANFL Showdown VII
2018	Kadina Oval	Kadina	SANFL Showdown X
2019	Port Pirie Oval	Port Pirie	SANFL Showdown XI
2021	Adelaide Oval	North Adelaide	SANFL Showdown XIII

=== Guernsey ===
Since competing in the SANFL competition, Adelaide has worn a guernsey that differs from the home guernsey of their AFL side. From 2014 to 2019, the SANFL side wore a "v-shape" style guernsey, chosen by members, that featured the red, gold and navy colours of the traditional strip in the upper third of the front of the guernsey, with a white base covering the remainder of the guernsey. Ahead of the 2021 season, the Crows switched to a hooped guernsey similar to the traditional AFL strip, but with gold and blue hoops on a predominantly red base. Since 2022, Adelaide have worn the same Indigenous guernsey as their AFL and AFL Women's counterparts. In 2025, Adelaide adopted a new away guernsey featuring the club's new logo on a dark blue background, mirroring the AFL teams' red equivalent.

== Current squad ==
Adelaide Football Club · SANFL personnel
Development squad		Coaching staff
4 Joseph Haines; 12 Jay Boyle; 14 Hugh Haysman; 16 Cameron Taheny; 37 Blake Drury; 47 James Richards; 45 Kieran Strachan (c); 46 Tom Bell; 49 Harry Boyle; 50 Darcy Clifford	50 William Crane; 51 Jay O'Leary; 53 Austin McDonald; 54 Tate Coleman; 55 Stephen Tahana; 55 Jaxon Bennett; 56 Saxon Evans; 57 Reuben Hill; 59 Lachlan Thomas; 60 Andrew McPherson	Head coach: Michael Godden (head of development); Assistant coaches: Jack Hombsch (defenders); Andrew McPherson (midfield); Jarrod Lienert (forwards); Legend: (c) Captain(s); (vc) Vice-captain(s); (i) Inactive; Updated: 19 October 2026; Source(s): Players, Coaches

== Season results and honours ==
Adelaide SANFL Honour Roll
Season	Ladder	W–L–D	Finals	Coach	Captain(s)	Best and fairest	Leading goalkicker
2014	8th	7–11–0	DNQ	Heath Younie	Ian Callinan	Ian Callinan	Ian Callinan (27)
2015	7th	8–9–1	DNQ	Heath Younie	Ian Callinan	Ian Callinan ^{(2)}	James Podsiadly (46)
2016	4th	11–7–0	Preliminary Finals	Heath Younie	Luke Carey	Jonathon Beech	Harry Dear (37)
2017	8th	7–11–0	DNQ	Ryan O'Keefe	Alex Keath & Hugh Greenwood	Scott Thompson	Troy Menzel (24)
2018	10th	1–17–0	DNQ	Ryan O'Keefe	Rotating (Note: Captaincy rotated between Alex Keath, Tom Doedee, Cam Ellis-Yolmen, Reilly O'Brien and Paul Hunter.)	Patrick Wilson	Ben Davis (22)
2019	3rd	11–6–1	Preliminary Finals	Heath Younie	Matthew Wright	Patrick Wilson ^{(2)}	Tyson Stengle (30)
2020	Did not field a team due to the COVID-19 pandemic						
2021	8th	5–13–0	DNQ	Michael Godden	Matthew Wright	Kieran Strachan	Billy Frampton (24)
2022	2nd	12–6–0	Preliminary Finals	Michael Godden	Matthew Wright	Kieran Strachan ^{(2)}	Matthew Wright (35)
2023	3rd	13–5–0	Preliminary Finals	Michael Godden	Matthew Wright	Jackson Hately	Lachlan Gollant (42)
2024	6th	8–10–0	DNQ	Michael Godden	Jack Madgen	Kieran Strachan ^{(3)}	Lachlan Gollant ^{(2)} (29)
2025	3rd	14–4–0	Semi Finals	Matthew Wright	Jack Madgen	Chris Burgess	Chris Burgess (56)
2026	7th	7–11–0	DNQ	Matthew Wright	Kieran Strachan	Blake Drury	Blake Drury (31)
2027	TBD			Michael Godden	TBD		

Premierships: 0
Runners up: 0
Minor premierships: 0
Wooden spoons: 1 (2018)

Magarey Medallists: 0
Jack Oatey Medallists: 0
Ken Farmer Medallists: 0

== Records and statistics ==
Updated to the end of the 2024 season

Club records

- Highest score: 27.17 (179) v West Adelaide, 2016
- Lowest score: 4.4 (28) v South Adelaide, 2018
- Biggest winning margin: 107 points v Sturt, 2015
- Biggest losing margin: 112 points v South Adelaide, 2018
- Longest winning streak: 8 games (2019)
- Longest losing streak: 14 games (2017–2018)

Individual records

- Most games: Kieran Strachan (102)
- Most goals: Lachlan Gollant (115)
- Most goals in a game: James Podsiadly (11) v Glenelg, 2015
- Most goals in a season: Chris Burgess (53), 2025
- Most disposals in a game: Patrick Wilson (43) v Woodville-West Torrens, 2019

== See also ==
- South Australian National Football League
- Adelaide Football Club coaches
- Australian rules football in South Australia
- List of Adelaide Football Club players
- Sport in Australia
- Sport in South Australia
- Wikipedia listing of Adelaide players
