= Kieran Strachan =

Australian rules footballer (born 1995)

Personal information
- Born: 5 October 1995 (age 31); Bendigo, Victoria
- Original teams: Port Melbourne (VFL), Essendon (VFL), South Bendigo
- Draft: No. 7, 2019 rookie draft
- Debut: 1 August 2020, Adelaide vs. North Melbourne, at Carrara Stadium
- Height: 204 cm (6 ft 8 in)
- Weight: 95 kg (209 lb)
- Position: Ruckman

Club information
- Current club: Adelaide
- Number: 45

Playing career
Years	Club	Games (Goals)
2019–2025	Adelaide	7 (1)

Career highlights
- 3x Adelaide (SANFL) Best & Fairest: 2021, 2022, 2024

Kieran Strachan (born 5 October 1995) is a former Australian rules footballer who played for the Adelaide Football Club in the Australian Football League (AFL). Strachan was selected with the 7th pick in the 2018 rookie draft. He was delisted after an injury filled 2025 season. He is the current ruck coach for Adelaide Football Club women's side.

== Early football ==
Strachan played football for the South Bendigo Football Club. He also played in Essendon's VFL reserves team, before being traded to the Port Melbourne Football Club, where he played 2 games in the 2018 season.

== AFL career ==
Strachan debuted in the Crows' 69 point loss to North Melbourne in the round 9 of the 2020 AFL season. On his debut, Strachan picked up 4 disposals and 4 tackles.

In 2024, Strachan played a pre-bye match to replace Adelaide's omitted ruckman, Reilly O'Brien. He kicked his first AFL goal in a loss against Richmond. Remaining dominant at SANFL (South Australian National Football League) level for Adelaide, he won a record third best and fairest award with the Crows.

Following the end of the 2024 season, Strachan suffered a fracture in his right foot, putting his 2025 pre-season in jeopardy and ruling him out for at least the first few weeks of the 2025 season. After sustaining another foot injury in February 2025, Strachan selflessly allowed himself to be moved to the inactive list for 2025. This meant that he would not be eligible for AFL selection but would vacate a list spot for young ruck Lachlan McAndrew to be signed to the Crows. After recovering from his injury, Adelaide received an exemption from the SANFL to allow the ruck to play for Adelaide's reserves team despite being on the AFL's inactive list.

== Personal life ==
Strachan is the younger brother of Rebecca Bulley (née Strachan), a former Australia netball international.

== Statistics ==
Legend
G	Goals	K	Kicks	D	Disposals	T	Tackles
B	Behinds	H	Handballs	M	Marks	H/O	Hit-outs

Season	Team	No.	Games	Totals								Averages (per game)								Votes
Season	Team	No.	Games	G	B	K	H	D	M	T	H/O	G	B	K	H	D	M	T	H/O	Votes
2019	Adelaide	45	0	—	—	—	—	—	—	—	—	—	—	—	—	—	—	—	—	0
2020 (Note: The 2020 season was played with 17 home-and-away matches per team (down from 22) and 16-minute quarters with time on (down from 20-minute quarters with time on) due to the impact of the COVID-19 pandemic.)	Adelaide	45	1	0	0	1	3	4	0	4	10	0.0	0.0	1.0	3.0	4.0	0.0	4.0	10.0	0
2021	Adelaide	45	2	0	2	13	16	29	7	3	59	0.0	1.0	6.5	8.0	14.5	3.5	1.5	29.5	0
2022	Adelaide	45	2	0	2	15	8	23	6	6	40	0.0	1.0	7.5	4.0	11.5	3.0	3.0	20.0	0
2023	Adelaide	45	0	—	—	—	—	—	—	—	—	—	—	—	—	—	—	—	—	0
2024	Adelaide	45	2	1	0	13	9	22	7	6	29	0.5	0.0	6.5	4.5	11.0	3.5	3.0	14.5	0
2025	Adelaide	45	0	—	—	—	—	—	—	—	—	—	—	—	—	—	—	—	—	0
Career			7	1	4	42	36	78	20	19	138	0.1	0.6	6.0	5.1	11.1	2.9	2.7	19.7	0
