= Richmond Oval (South Australia) =

Australian rules football oval

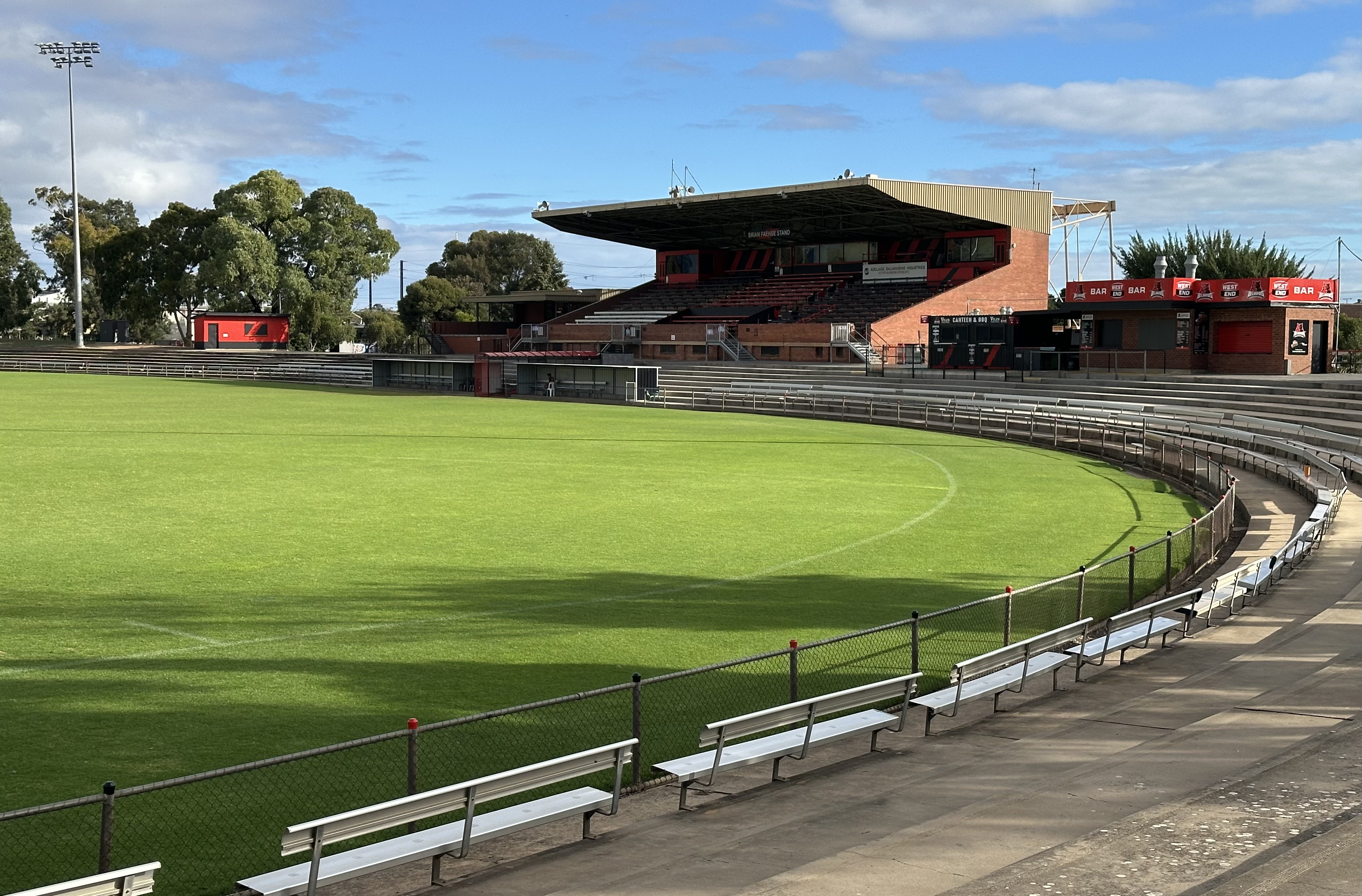
- Richmond Oval in 2026
- Interactive map of Richmond Oval
- Former names: City Mazda Stadium; BroadSpectrum Oval
- Location: Milner Road, Richmond, South Australia
- Coordinates: 34°56′14″S 138°34′6″E
- Owner: City of West Torrens
- Operator: West Adelaide Football Club
- Capacity: 9,000
- Surface: Grass
- Record attendance: 15,742 – West Adelaide vs Glenelg, 1969
- Field size: Football: 170m x 125m

Construction
- Groundbreaking: 1954
- Opened: 26 April 1958
- Cost: £20,000

Tenants
- West Adelaide Football Club (SANFL) (1958–present); Gridiron Association of South Australia (2012–present); Adelaide Football Club (AFLW) (2020–present)

Allied Waste Stadium (known as Richmond Oval ) is an Australian rules football oval in the Adelaide suburb of Richmond. It is the home of the West Adelaide Football Club in the South Australian National Football League (SANFL).

== History ==
Richmond Oval was constructed upon land formerly used for housing that fell into major disrepair during the Great Depression and possessed demand for restoration because of the movement of people from the inner city. West Adelaide had lost the Wayville Showground as their home ground after the 1939 season after it was taken over by the Australian Army due to the outbreak of World War II and had no home ground, instead playing its matches at Adelaide Oval along with South Adelaide. A major problem with this arrangement is that there was not enough room for both of these clubs to train even using the practice Adelaide Oval #1.

Although the decision to build a football oval was made in 1946, the West Adelaide Football Club did not decide on using it until 1952. After this decision was made, the ground was completely returfed and a grandstand erected, a process which took six years, during which many lower grade games were already played at the ground.

Originally West Adelaide hoped to start using the ground for SANFL league games in 1956. The Grounds Committee sought an undertaking from the council to complete the oval and have it ready for that season. Unfortunately the council was not in a financial position to meet the whole burden of this request and as a result, the club had no option but to use the venue only for training purposes that year. After many negotiations with the Council and the SANFL, including an AU£10,000, 10-year loan from the SANFL and another £10,000 loan from a local trading bank to pay for improvements, the ground was gradually developed with improvements including:

- The completion of the grandstand (roofing & seating),
- Fencing off the grandstand area,
- Erecting toilets,
- Terracing of the mound in front of the grandstand
- Erect necessary turnstiles, ticket boxes etc.
- Scoreboard erected in the north-east corner (donated by Halls Softdrinks Ltd)

The ground was officially opened by the Chief Secretary of the South Australian Government, Sir Lyell McEwin in 1958. In its first year, Richmond Oval was such a success that the SANFL decided to switch its traditional Anzac Day Grand Final rematch from the Adelaide Oval to the ground for 1959 (West Adelaide vs Port Adelaide). The first game at Richmond saw the Bloods run out 12.11 (83) to 10.13 (73) winners over neighbouring club West Torrens.

Richmond Oval has a capacity of 16,500 with seating for up to 2,000 in the B. K. Faehse Stand, named for former club captain Brian Faehse who played 224 games for The Bloods between 1944 and 1956. Faeshe was instrumental in bringing Richmond Oval to life as a volunteer who worked on building the ground and as a driving force behind the scenes as a member of the Grounds Committee to give the club its own home ground for the first time in its 50+ year history. The oval runs north–south with concrete terracing surrounding the entire ground with a grass bank above the south western concrete and also the north-eastern concrete around to the outer wing. Richmond's goal to goal, wing to wing dimensions are 170m x 130m.

The ground record crowd was set in Round 5 of the 1969 SANFL season when 15,742 saw West Adelaide go down to the Neil Kerley coached Glenelg Tigers 18.18 (126) to 8.9 (57). Kerley had previously spent 10 years playing for Westies, playing 155 games between 1952 and 1963. He also coached West Adelaide to their most recent premiership at the time in 1961 and would in fact coach their next premiership in 1983.

Originally known as Richmond Oval, it was renamed as a result of sponsorship deals to Broadspectrum Oval in 2006 and then City Mazda Stadium in 2009. Hisense took over naming rights to the venue in 2020. Lights for night games were also installed in time for the 2010 season and have so far been a success for the club with 6,133 fans showing their support for the club's first home game under lights against North Adelaide on 26 March. As of the end of The Bloods 2011 season, ten night games have been held at Richmond Oval with a total attendance of 36,961.

Richmond Oval is currently one of five suburban SANFL grounds to offer night football. The others are Norwood Oval (Norwood), Elizabeth Oval (Central District), Hickinbotham Oval (South Adelaide) and Glenelg Oval (Glenelg) (Note: Thebarton Oval, the part time home of Woodville-West Torrens, also has lights for night games.)

The oval was used as a venue in the AFL's 2014 pre-season, the NAB Challenge. On 16 February, the Adelaide Crows defeated Port Adelaide 0.18.11 (119) to 0.9.5 (59) in front of 8,765 fans, the largest attendance at the ground since the 1980s.

The Adelaide Football Club's AFL Women's team used the venue as their home ground during the 2020 AFLW season while Norwood Oval was unavailable.

On November 9, 2026, a $25 million redevelopment of Richmond Oval was announced. The existing Brian K. Faehse stand will be demolished with a new stand built in its place with new player and media facilities as well as a function room and undercover seating for spectators. This followed damage done to the changerooms and gym inside the Faehse stand in May 2026 following heavy rains which resulted in two West Adelaide home games being relocated, and temporary facilities having to be used for the remainder of the 2026 season.

== Interstate football ==
Richmond Oval hosted its first senior Interstate match on Saturday 11 May 2013, when South Australia defeated the North East Australian Football League (NEAFL North) 21.14 (140) to 9.4 (58). West Adelaide captain Ryan Ferguson was awarded the Fos Williams Medal as the Croweaters best player.

== Other uses ==
Unlike some other SANFL grounds such as Glenelg, Prospect, Unley and Woodville ovals, Richmond Oval is not regularly used for cricket during the football off-season. Since 2012 Richmond has played host to the Gridiron Association of South Australia, with the Association's Grand Final played at the venue (the GASA had previously used the nearby Thebarton Oval).
