= Prospect Oval =

Sports venue in Prospect, South Australia

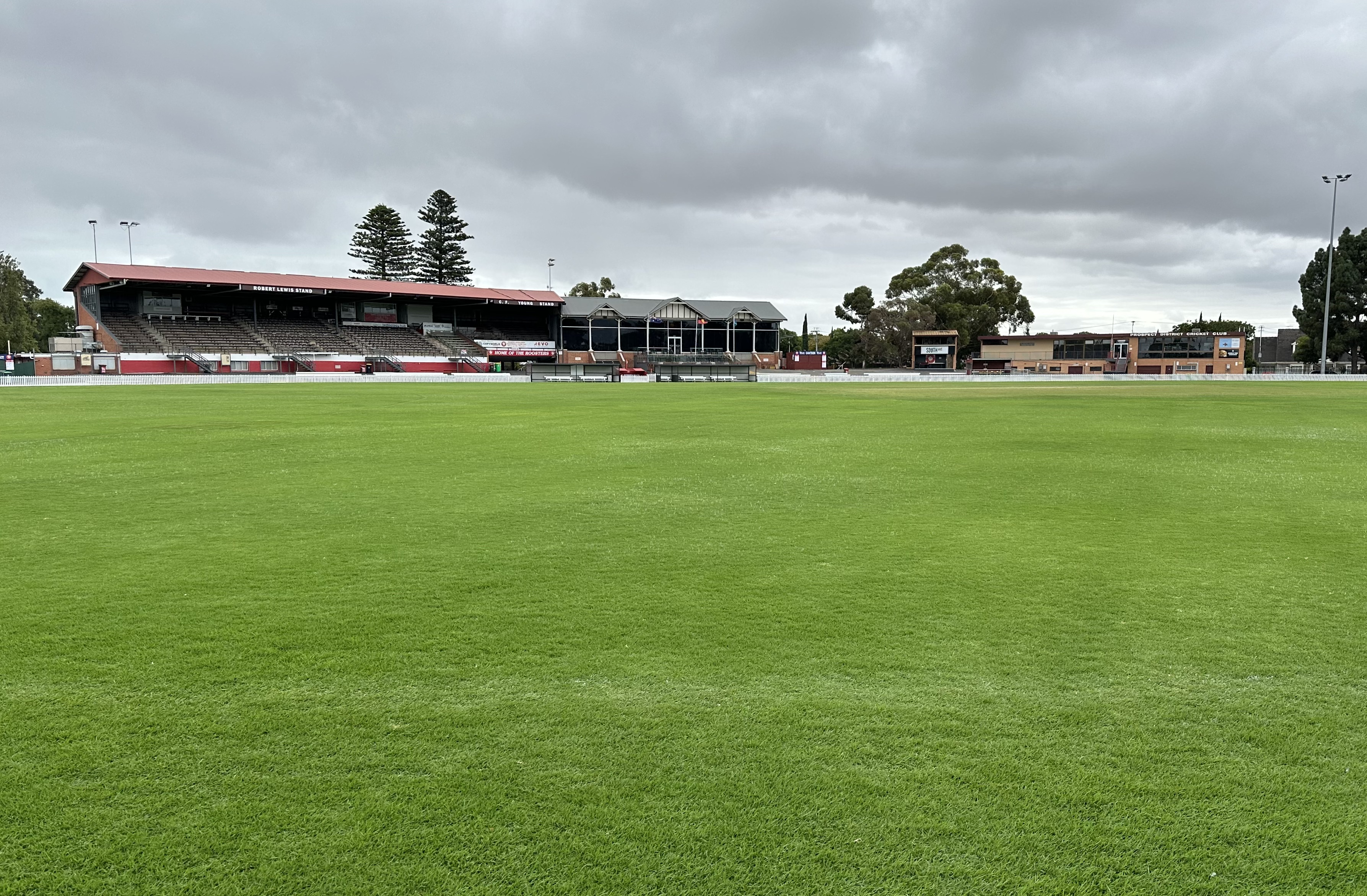
- Prospect Oval in April 2026
- Interactive map of Prospect Oval
- Address: Menzies Crescent; Prospect, South Australia
- Coordinates: 34°53′8″S 138°36′3″E
- Owner: City of Prospect
- Capacity: 20,000
- Record attendance: 19,137 – North Adelaide vs Port Adelaide, 1958
- Field size: Football: 170m x 120m

Construction
- Groundbreaking: 1897; 129 years ago
- Opened: 1898; 128 years ago

Tenants
- North Adelaide Football Club (1922–present); Prospect Cricket Club (1928–present)

Prospect Oval (known under naming rights as Revo Fitness Oval) is an Australian rules football and cricket venue in the Adelaide suburb of Prospect. It is the home of the North Adelaide Football Club in the South Australian National Football League (SANFL) and the Prospect Cricket Club in the South Australian Premier Cricket (SAPC) competition.

== History ==
The oval has a capacity of 20,000 people with seated grandstands holding approximately 2,000. An unusual feature of the oval is that it is laid out askew from the conventional orientation of Australian rules football and cricket ovals, with the goal posts located at the South-Western and the North-Eastern ends, and the cricket pitch running in the same direction. All other grounds in the SANFL run in a north–south direction.

The ground record attendance was set in Round 5 of the 1958 SANFL season when 19,137 saw defending SANFL premiers Port Adelaide defeat North Adelaide 14.14 (98) to 8.10 (58). The oval's dimensions for Australian football are 170m x 120m.

The oval was opened in 1898 by the colonial Premier at the time Sir Charles Kingston. The North Adelaide Football Club first used the Oval for home games in 1922 with the first match taking place on 8 May 1922 with North Adelaide playing Glenelg. The North Adelaide Roosters have used Prospect Oval as its home ground ever since, except for a time during World War II when, due to a lack of available players, they joined forces with Norwood. The combined team used Norwood Oval as their home ground.

The North Adelaide Football Club officially renamed both ends of Prospect Oval in 2012 after the two official Icons of the club. The northern end around the goals was named the Ken Farmer End after the club and SANFL's all-time leading goalkicker while the southern end was named the Barrie Robran End after the three time Magarey Medal winner.
