= Elizabeth Oval =

Australian rules football venue in Elizabeth, South Australia

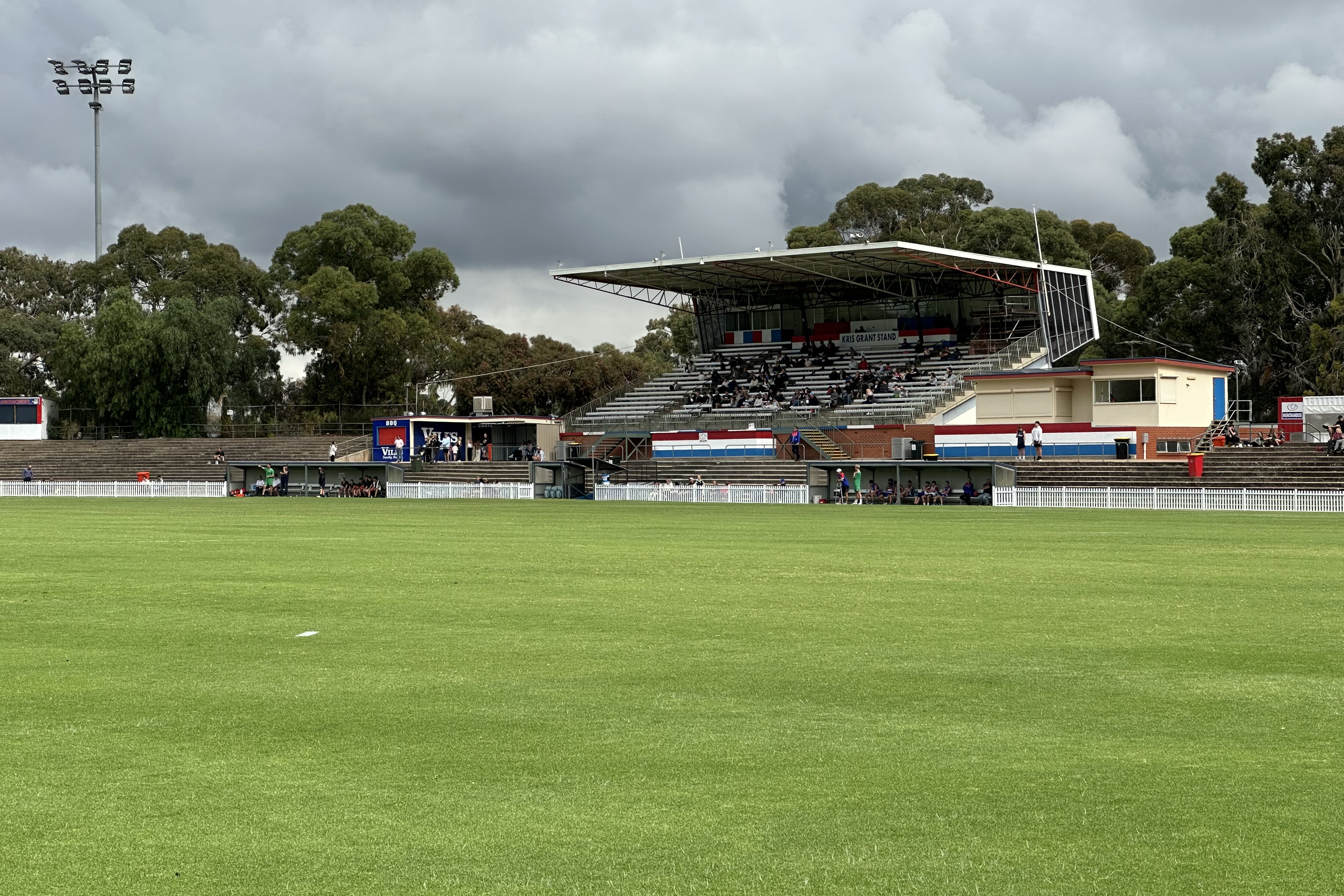
- Interactive map of Elizabeth Oval
- Former names: Elizabeth Oval (1959–2001); NAP Oval (2002–05); Hamra Homes Oval (2006–2010); Playford Alive Oval (2011–15)
- Address: Goodman Road; Elizabeth, South Australia
- Coordinates: 34°43′20″S 138°39′48″E
- Owner: City of Playford
- Operator: Central District Football Club
- Capacity: 18,000
- Surface: Grass
- Record attendance: 16,029 – Central District vs Port Adelaide, 1984
- Field size: Football: 178m x 130m

Construction
- Opened: 1959

Tenants
- Central District Football Club SANFL (1959–present)

Elizabeth Oval (known under naming rights as X Convenience Oval) is an Australian rules football venue located in the Adelaide suburb of Elizabeth. It is the home of the Central District Football Club in the South Australian National Football League (SANFL).

== History ==
The ground has a capacity of approximately 18,000 people, with a single grandstand that seats 1,500. The oval, the longest goal to goal venue in the SANFL at 178m (3m longer than Woodville Oval, though fence to fence it is 15m shorter), and is surrounded by concrete terracing on the grandstand side of the ground, plus a 5 row ring of concrete around the rest of the ground, with grass banks around the entire outer. The ground record crowd of 16,029 was set in 1984 for an SANFL match between the Centrals and the Port Adelaide Magpies.

After negotiations between Central District and the City of Playford, light towers were installed in March 2006 allowing the Bulldogs to play night SANFL games. The first official night game was held at the oval in April 2006 when 7,329 fans turned out to see the defending SANFL premiers (Centrals) defeat Sturt. The ground has not been used for many night matches since the 2000s, other than a few pre-season matches.

The ground was known as Elizabeth Oval from the time it opened until 2001. In 2002, the Club signed a naming rights deal with NAP Finance and the oval's name changed to NAP Oval. Elizabeth Oval was the first SANFL club venue to secure an oval naming rights deal. The first deal expired after 2005 and NAP was replaced by Northern Adelaide home builder Hamra Homes, who held the naming rights as Hamra Homes Oval until the end of 2010. From 2011 to 2015, the oval was known as Playford Alive Oval, and in 2016 changed its name to My Money House Oval. From 2019, South Australian service station company X Convenience held the naming rights of the Oval. In addition, the Oval is nicknamed "the Ponderosa".

Elizabeth Oval is easily accessible by either car or public transport with Adelaide's northern suburban commuter railway line, the Gawler railway line passing by the western side of the oval and Elizabeth railway station located within five minutes walking distance of the oval. The ground also has plenty of in ground (for members, players and officials) and on-street car parking, as well as ample parking at the nearby shopping mall, the Elizabeth City Centre.
