= 1917 SAPFL Grand Final =

Port Adelaide	West Torrens
10.12 (72)	8.8 (56)
	1	2	3	4
PA	0.1 (1)	4.3 (27)	7.5 (47)	10.12 (72)
WT	3.1 (19)	4.1 (25)	6.7 (43)	8.8 (56)
- Date: 1 September 1917 (3:10pm)
- Stadium: Alberton Oval
- Umpires: S. Coleman

Accolades
- Best on Ground: Jack Ashley

The 1917 SAPFL Grand Final was an Australian rules football game contested between the Port Adelaide Football Club and the West Torrens Football Club, held at Alberton Oval on Saturday 1 September 1917. It was the 2nd Grand Final of the South Australian Patriotic Football League, staged to determine the premiers of the 1917 SAPFL season. The match was won by Port Adelaide by a margin of 16 points, marking that clubs second patriotic premiership victory.

The SAFL was opposed to the formation of the Patriotic League and refused to recognise it during and after World War I.

== Teams ==
West Torrens made two late changes with Campbell and Marsh.

Port Adelaide
B:	Alex McFarlane	T. Trimble	Cuthbert Lincoln
HB:	Henry Eaton (c)	Albert Hembury	Hercules Duthie
C:	Leonard Wisdom	Sampson Hosking	Roy Drew
HF:	Alf Causby	Harold Oliver	John Middleton
F:	Loyal Lackman	Clarence Hoffman	John Hayman
Foll:	Jack Ashley	John Taylor	Angelo Congear

West Torrens
B:	Stan Patten (C)	Jack Karney (VC)	Burns
HB:	Campbell	Curnow	Edwin Daviess
C:	Hele	Hegarty	Johnson
HF:	Les Marvell	Manning	George Richmond
F:	Sim	Ernie Stone	Tonkin
Foll:	Alf Walker	Williams	Wakefield
Coach:	Positions not allocated		
