= Harry Eaton =

Harry Eaton may refer to:

- Harry B. Eaton, state legislator in North Carolina
- Harry Ronald Eaton, Australian cricketer and rugby league

== See also ==
- Henry Eaton (disambiguation)
