= 1916 SAPFL Grand Final =

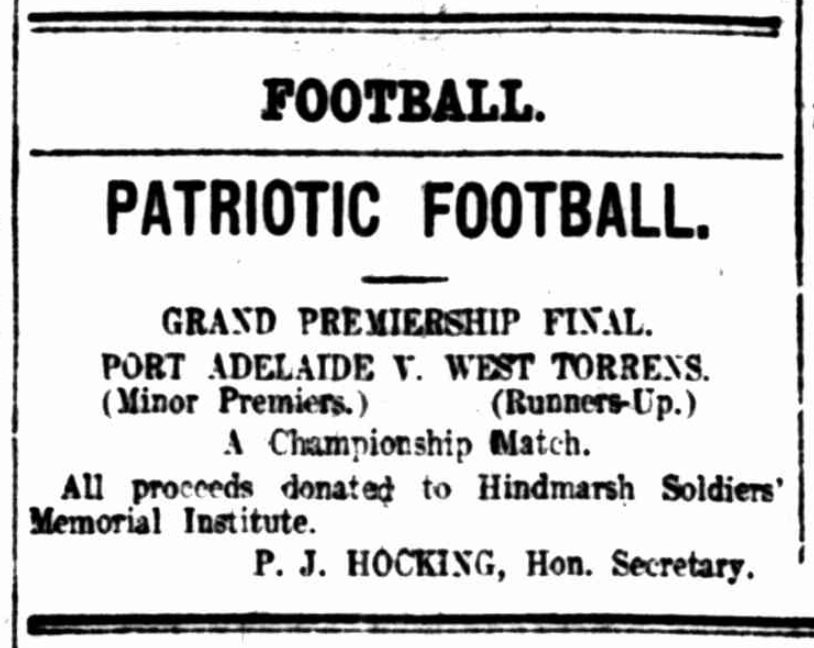

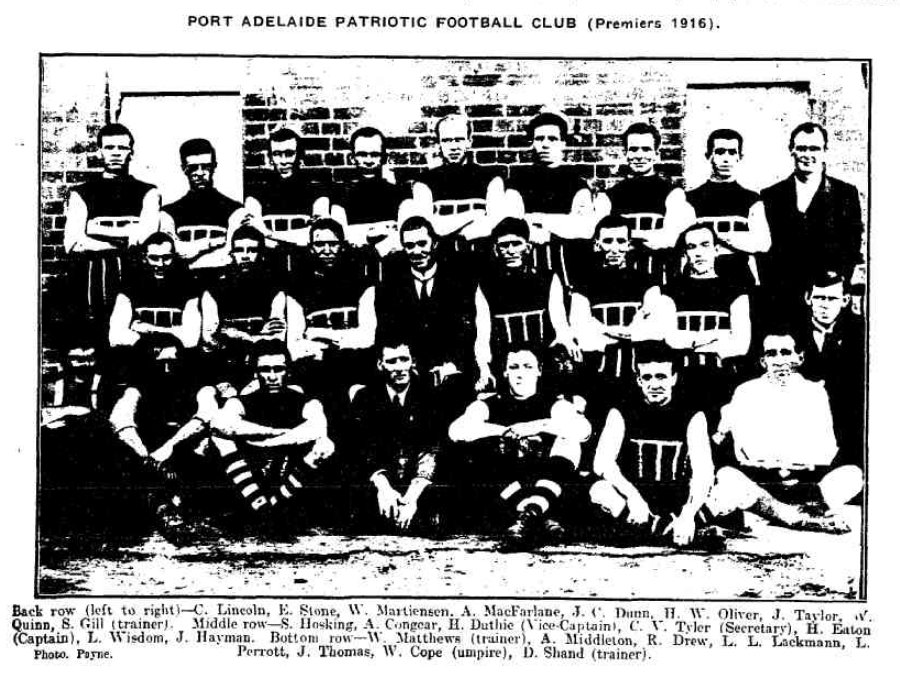
- Top: Advertisement for the 1916 SAPFL Grand Final that appeared in The Regent newspaper. Bottom: 1916 Port Adelaide SAPFL premiers.

Port Adelaide	West Torrens
7.11 (53)	1.13 (19)
	1	2	3	4
PA	3.5 (23)	5.5 (35)	7.10 (52)	7.11 (53)
WT	0.0 (0)	1.7 (13)	1.10 (16)	1.13 (19)
- Date: 19 August 1916
- Stadium: Hindmarsh Oval
- Umpires: A. Hickey

Accolades
- Best on Ground: Sampson Hosking

The 1916 SAPFL Grand Final was an Australian rules football game contested between the Port Adelaide Football Club and the West Torrens Football Club, held at Hindmarsh Oval on Saturday 19 August 1916. It was the 1st Grand Final of the South Australian Patriotic Football League, staged to determine the premiers of the 1916 SAPFL season. The match was won by Port Adelaide by a margin of 34 points, marking that clubs first patriotic premiership victory.

The SAFL was opposed to the formation of the Patriotic League and refused to recognise it during and after World War I. Hindmarsh Oval was the contingency venue for the Grand Final if an agreement with the SACA could not be reached as the Adelaide Oval was the preferred venue of the SAPFL.

== Teams ==
Port Adelaide
B:	John Middleton	Otto Martiensen	S. Gill
HB:	Hercules Duthie (vc)	Henry Eaton (c)	Albert Stone
C:	Roy Drew	Sampson Hosking	Cuthbert Lincoln
HF:	Carl Perrott	Harold Oliver	John Dunn
F:	Loyal Lackman	John Hayman	Alex McFarlane
Foll:	John Taylor	William Quinn	Thomas
Coach:	S.Gill & D.Shand		

West Torrens
B:	Patten (c)	Karney (vc)	Marsh
HB:	O'Loughlin	Miller	Johnson
C:	Campbell	Hele	Hele
HF:	Trembath	Williams	Curnow
F:	Job	Richmond	Varley
Foll:	Wakefield	Duncan	Sim
Coach:	Positions not allocated.		
