= 1918 SAPFL Grand Final =

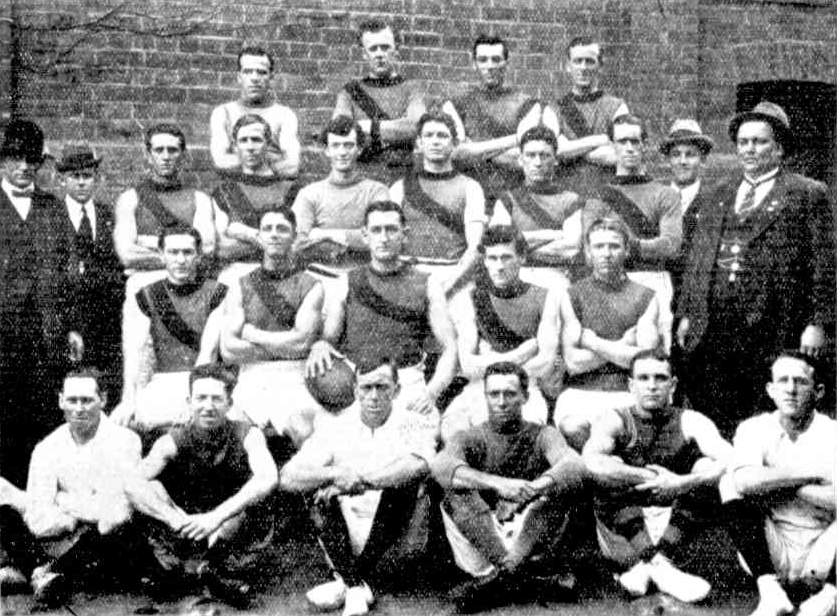
- 3rd SAPFL season Pictured above is the 1918 West Torrens SAPFL premiership team.

West Torrens	West Adelaide
5.13 (43)	3.11 (29)
	1	2	3	4
WT	2.3 (15)	4.7 (31)	4.10 (34)	5.13 (43)
WA	1.4 (10)	1.7 (13)	3.10 (28)	3.11 (29)
- Date: 9 October 1918
- Stadium: Jubilee Oval
- Attendance: 7,000

The 1918 SAPFL Grand Final was an Australian rules football game contested between the West Torrens Football Club and the West Adelaide Football Club, held at Jubilee Oval on Wednesday 9 October 1918. It was the 3rd Grand Final of the South Australian Patriotic Football League, staged to determine the premiers of the 1918 SAPFL season. The match was won by West Torrens by a margin of 14 points, marking that club's first patriotic premiership victory after losing the two previous Grand Finals both to Port Adelaide.

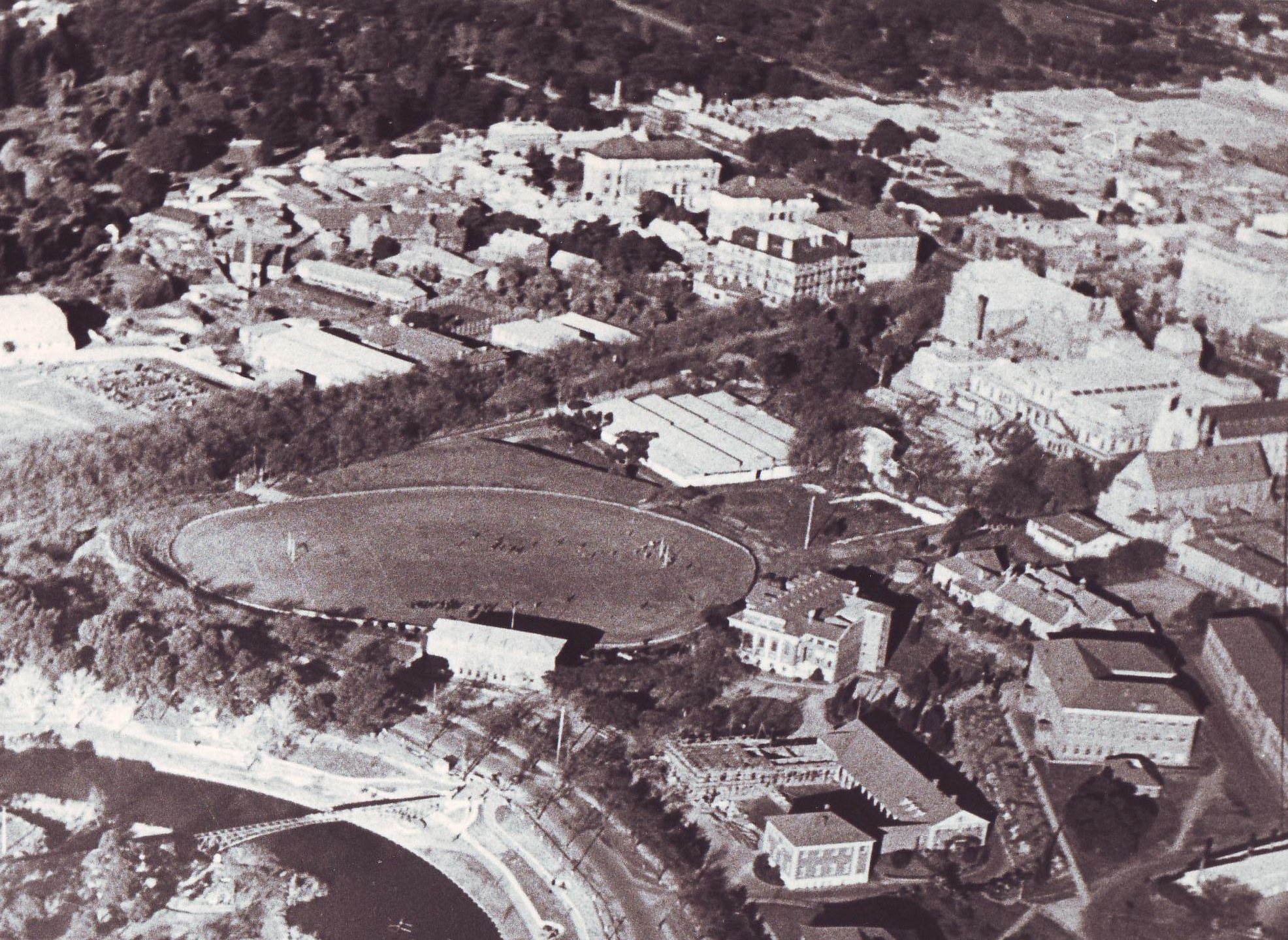
Jubilee Oval, Adelaide

The SAFL was opposed to the formation of the Patriotic League and refused to recognise it during and after World War I.
