= 2019 SANFL Grand Final =

- Official match program cover.

Port Adelaide	Glenelg
6.9 (45)	11.7 (73)
	1	2	3	4
POR	0.3 (3)	2.7 (19)	5.8 (38)	6.9 (45)
GLE	4.1 (25)	6.2 (38)	9.5 (59)	11.7 (73)
- Date: 22 September 2019, 3:00pm
- Stadium: Adelaide Oval
- Attendance: 39,105
- Umpires: Bryce, Crosby, Harris

Ceremonies
- Pre-match entertainment: Bad Dreems

Accolades
- Jack Oatey Medallist: Matthew Snook

Broadcast in Australia
- Network: Seven Network
- Commentators: Mark Soderstrom, John Casey, Tim Ginever, Rhett Biglands and Andrew Hayes

The 2019 SANFL Grand Final was a match at the Adelaide Oval on Sunday, 22 September to determine the South Australian National Football League (SANFL premiers for the 2019 season.

The match was won by Glenelg who defeated Port Adelaide by 28 points to win their first premiership since 1986 and their fifth overall.

== Background ==
Glenelg finished the 2019 SANFL season as the minor premiers for the first time since 2009 SANFL season. It was also Glenelg's first finals campaign since 2011 SANFL season. Port Adelaide were solid for most of the 2019 SANFL season, especially towards the second half where they won 10 out of 11 matches going into the finals. Glenelg was the only team to beat Port Adelaide in the last 11 matches and the only team to beat Port Adelaide twice during the season.

Glenelg had the first week off of the finals as minor premiers. Norwood beat Sturt in the Elimination Final, while Port Adelaide ran over Adelaide during the last quarter of a Showdown Qualifying Final. Week 2 of the finals saw Norwood get rolled by Adelaide in a one-sided affair during the Semi-Final, while Glenelg looked flat after the week off and it dropped its first game to Port Adelaide for the year narrowly losing in the last quarter and allowing the Magpies to book their ticket to the Grand Final.

So the stage was set for a cracking Preliminary Final between Glenelg and Adelaide. Glenelg broke the game open early leaving the Adelaide behind in the contest all match and eventually run over Adelaide 105 to 78. This set up an exciting Grand Final for the SANFL as Port Adelaide and Glenelg have shared an intense rivalry for decades. Glenelg beat Port Adelaide in its first Premiership year during the 1934 SANFL Grand Final, however Port Adelaide have had the wood over the Bays for the remainder of their future Grand Final meetings beating them in 1977 SANFL Grand Final, 1981 SANFL Grand Final, 1988 SANFL Grand Final, 1990 SANFL Grand Final, 1992 SANFL Grand Final. This was sure set to be a great contest for both clubs.

The day was cold and wet early on, creating rough conditions for a clean skilled match. Like the Preliminary Final Glenelg found voice early on and kicked the first 4 goals of the match. This set the tone early on in which Glenelg had entire control of the game and run out winners 11.7 (73) d 6.9 (45), winning their first premiership in 33 Years and first one over Port Adelaide for 85 Years. This Premiership broke a long and painful drought for Glenelg in which they lost 1987 SANFL Grand Final, 1988 SANFL Grand Final, 1990 SANFL Grand Final, 1992 SANFL Grand Final and 2008 SANFL Grand Final, but it also took the monkey off its back with Port Adelaide and its inability to beat them on the big stage.

== Teams ==
Glenelg
B:	Jonty Scharenberg	Max Proud (vc)	Will Gould
HB:	Aaron Joseph	Chris Curran (c)	Brad McCarthy
C:	Cory Gregson	Matthew Snook	Carl Nicholson
HF:	Marlon Motlop	Liam McBean	Andrew Bradley
F:	Luke Reynolds	Josh Scott	Luke Partington
Foll:	Jesse White	Bradley Close	Brad Agnew
Int:	Michael Virgin	Darcy Bailey	Matt Uebergang
Coach:	Mark Stone		
