= Will Gould (footballer) =

Personal information
- Full name: Will Gould
- Born: 14 January 2001 (age 25)
- Draft: No. 26, 2019 national draft
- Debut: Round 5, 2023, Sydney vs. Richmond, at Adelaide Oval
- Height: 191 cm (6 ft 3 in)
- Weight: 98 kg (216 lb)

Club information
- Current club: Glenelg
- Number: 1

Playing career
Years	Club	Games (Goals)
2019, 2024–	Glenelg	
2020–2023	Sydney	4 (0)

Career highlights
- Sydney VFL Player of the Year: 2022; 2x SANFL premiership player: 2019, 2024

Will Gould (born 14 February 2001) is an Australian rules footballer who currently plays for the Glenelg Football Club in the South Australian National Football League (SANFL). He previously played for the Sydney Swans in the Australian Football League (AFL).

== Career ==
Gould made his debut for Glenelg in 2019, playing in the club's grand final victory over Port Adelaide. He was recruited by Sydney with pick 26 in the 2019 AFL draft.

In his first season in 2020, Gould did not play any games for Sydney in the AFL or for the club's reserves team in the North East Australian Football League (NEAFL), which had its season cancelled. He eventually made his reserves debut in the Victorian Football League (VFL), collecting 11 disposals in round 1 of the 2021 season. At the end of the season, he signed a one-year contract extension with Sydney.

Gould continued playing for Sydney's reserves team in 2022. He played 20 out of a possible 21 games, kicking 3 goals and recording a total of 374 disposals, and was named as Sydney's VFL player of the year for the 2022 season.

1,233 days after he was drafted, Gould made his AFL debut for Sydney in round 5 of the 2023 season against Richmond at Adelaide Oval. He played a further three games, but was delisted by Sydney at the end of the season.

On 29 November 2023, Gould returned to Glenelg for the 2024 SANFL season. He won his second premiership for the club playing in the 2024 grand final against Norwood.
