= 1916 SAPFL season =

1916 Patriotic season
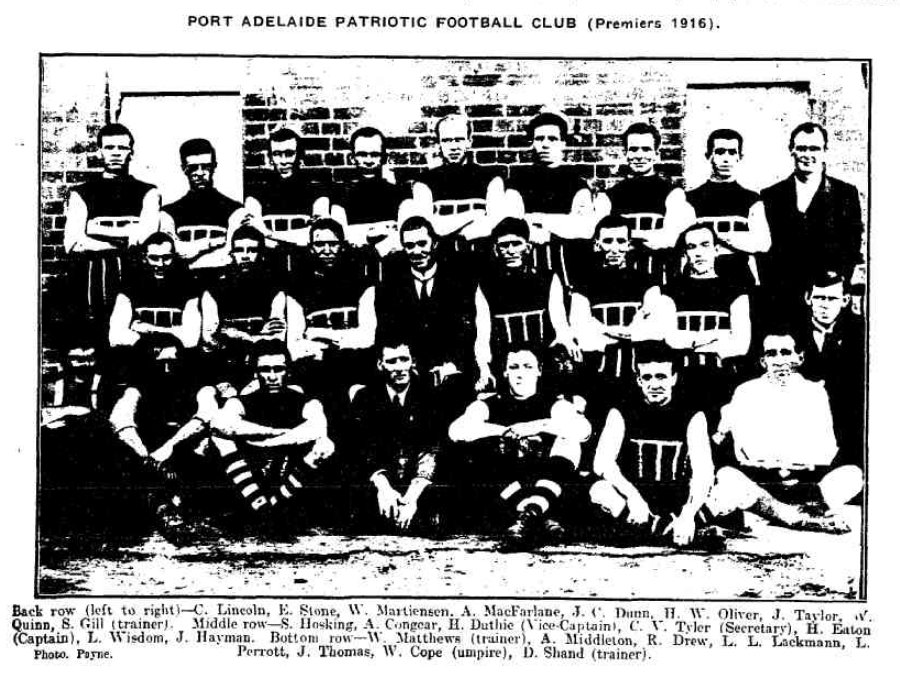
- 1st SAPFL season Pictured above is the 1916 Port Adelaide SAPFL premiership team.
- Teams: 6
- Premiers: Port Adelaide; 1st premiership
- Minor premiers: Port Adelaide; 1st minor premiership
- Leading goalkicker: John Hayman; Port Adelaide (36 goals)

The 1916 SAPFL season was the first season of the South Australian Patriotic Football League, a competition formed in the absence of the South Australian Football League during World War I. The SAFL was opposed to the formation of the Patriotic League and refused to recognise it during and after World War I.

== Clubs ==
Patriotic football clubs were formed and admitted to the Patriotic League for the Electoral District system which had been adopted by the South Australian Football Association. The exception was the South Australian Railway Football Club, which was formed in 1911, which was only permitted a maximum of three players from any Electoral District.

A Sturt delegation was granted affiliation but there was no representation from the Sturt district until 1918. The Sturt league premiership team from 1915 had 11 of its senior players enlisted in the military. The South Adelaide Football Club, which was Adelaide-based, also did not form a patriotic club until 1918. The North Adelaide Electoral District was represented by Prospect, the Adelaide and Suburban Association premiers in 1912 and 1913, and adopted the colours red and white. The other SAFA clubs also had lost many senior players to enlistment early in World War I.

Club	Home Ground	Captain	Comment
Norwood	East Park Lands, Adelaide	Clarrie Packham	Started in the juniors and seconds at Norwood before first playing in the seniors in 1910. Club Captain and Coach in 1915.
Port Adelaide	Swansea Oval, Largs Bay; Alberton Oval	Harry Eaton	Played for Port Adelaide 1911-1915
Prospect	Prospect Recreation Ground	Dan O'Brien	First played for North Adelaide Football Club in 1909.
South Australian Railways		Harold Oliver (1st Game only); Bert Johnson	Oliver played for Port Adelaide from 1910–15. He returned to his farm in Berri after the first game but rejoined Port Adelaide later in the season.
West Adelaide	South Park Lands, Adelaide	Norman Victor (Vic) Peters	Played for West Adelaide B Grade team. Became a Senior player in 1920.
West Torrens	Hindmarsh Oval	Stan Patten	First played for West Torrens in 1913.

== Premiership season ==
=== Round 1 ===
	Round 1
Saturday, 13 May	Prospect 4.4 (28)	def. by	West Torrens 4.6 (30)	Prospect Oval (crowd: 300)
Saturday, 13 May	West Adelaide 4.8 (32)	def.	Norwood 2.7 (19)	South Park
Saturday, 13 May	Port Adelaide 14.14 (98)	def.	SA Railway 3.8 (26)	Large Bay

=== Round 2 ===
	Round 2
Saturday, 20 May	West Torrens 15.8 (98)	def.	SA Railway 2.14 (26)	Hindmarsh Oval (crowd: 1000)
Saturday, 20 May	West Adelaide 6.5 (41)	def. by	Port Adelaide 9.14 (68)	South Park (crowd: 3000)
Saturday, 20 May	Prospect 14.16 (100)	def.	Norwood 7.9 (51)	Prospect Oval (crowd: 1000)

=== Round 3 ===
	Round 3
Saturday, 27 May	Norwood 1.6 (12)	def. by	West Torrens 14.15 (99)	East Park (crowd: 3000)
Saturday, 27 May	West Adelaide 7.9 (51)	def.	SA Railway 5.4 (34)	South Park
Saturday, 27 May	Port Adelaide 9.23 (77)	def.	Prospect 5.5 (35)	Hindmarsh Oval

=== Round 4 ===
	Round 4
Saturday, 3 June	Norwood 4.6 (30)	def. by	Port Adelaide 13.16 (94)	East Park
Saturday, 3 June	West Torrens 8.12 (60)	def.	West Adelaide 8.6 (54)	Hindmarsh Oval
Saturday, 3 June	Prospect 5.8 (38)	def.	SA Railway 3.6 (24)	Prospect Oval (crowd: 800)

=== Round 5 ===
	Round 5
Saturday, 10 June	Port Adelaide 5.6 (36)	def. by	West Torrens 7.10 (52)	Alberton Oval
Saturday, 10 June	West Adelaide 11.9 (75)	def.	Prospect 2.4 (16)	South Park
Saturday, 10 June	Norwood 6.9 (45)	def.	SA Railway 2.8 (20)	Hindmarsh Oval

=== Round 6 ===
	Round 6
Saturday, 17 June	SA Railway 3.4 (22)	def. by	Port Adelaide 22.19 (151)	Prospect Oval
Saturday, 17 June	Norwood 6.3 (39)	def. by	West Adelaide 11.17 (83)	East Park
Saturday, 17 June	West Torrens 11.12 (78)	def.	Prospect 3.5 (23)	Hindmarsh Oval

=== Round 7 ===
	Round 7
Saturday, 1 July	Port Adelaide 5.14 (44)	def.	West Adelaide 6.0 (36)	Alberton Oval
Saturday, 1 July	Norwood 4.8 (32)	def.	Prospect 1.7 (12)	East Park
	Bye; West Torrens
SA Railway disbanded prior to the commencement of Round 7. Due to this, their opponent for Round 7 (West Torrens) was awarded a win for this round.

=== Round 8 ===
	Round 8
Saturday, 8 July	Prospect 3.12 (39)	def. by	Port Adelaide 5.9 (39)	Prospect Oval (crowd: 2500)
Saturday, 8 July	West Torrens 11.20 (86)	def.	Norwood 2.4 (16)	Hindmarsh Oval
	Bye; West Adelaide
Due to SA Railway disbanding, West Adelaide was awarded a win for this round.

=== Round 9 ===
	Round 9
Saturday, 15 July	West Torrens 9.17 (71)	def. by	Port Adelaide 10.14 (74)	Hindmarsh Oval
Saturday, 15 July	Prospect 7.9 (51)	def.	West Adelaide 3.4 (22)	Prospect Oval (crowd: 2000+)
	Bye; Norwood
Due to SA Railway disbanding, Norwood was awarded a win for this round.

=== Round 10 ===
	Round 10
Saturday, July 22	Port Adelaide 15.19 (109)	def.	Norwood 2.9 (21)	Alberton Oval
Saturday, July 28	West Torrens 6.21 (57)	def.	West Adelaide 6.11 (47)	Adelaide Oval (crowd: 4500)
	Bye; Prospect
Due to SA Railway disbanding, Prospect was awarded a win for this round.

== Ladder ==
1916 SAPFL Ladder
Pos	Team	Pld	W	L	D	PF	PA	PP	Pts
1	Port Adelaide (P)	10	9	1	0	796	364	68.62	18
2	West Torrens	10	9	1	0	631	316	66.63	18
3	West Adelaide	10	5	5	0	441	394	52.81	10
4	Prospect	10	4	6	0	334	416	44.53	8
5	Norwood	10	3	7	0	253	636	28.46	6
6	SA Railway (Note: Railway disbanded in July after the sixth match, and wins were awarded to the opposing teams for the remaining matches.)	6	0	6	0	152	481	24.01	0

Rules for classification: 1) points; 2) percentage; 3) number of points for.
(P) Premiers

== Final Series ==
=== Semi Finals ===
1916 SAPFL First Semi Final
Saturday, 5 August	Port Adelaide	def.	West Adelaide	Hindmarsh Oval
3.3 (21); 7.5 (47); 11.10 (76); 13.12 (90)	Q1; Q2; Q3; Final	1.0 (6); 1.0 (6); 1.1 (7); 3.4 (22)	Umpires: C. R. O'Connor
Dunn (3), Oliver, Macfarlane, Hayman (2), Perrott, Congear, Lincoln, Wisdom	Goals	N/A
Eaton, Hosking, Taylor, Lincoln, Macfarlane, Oliver, Congear, Drew, Perrott, Thomas	Best	Peters, Golding, Gipp, Teisseire, Mayman, Oliver, O'Neill

1916 SAPFL Second Semi Final
Saturday, 12 August	West Torrens	def.	Prospects	Alberton Oval
1.1 (7); 1.5 (11); 1.5 (11); 5.10 (40)	Q1; Q2; Q3; Final	0.3 (3); 1.3 (9); 2.4 (16); 2.4 (16)	Umpires: A. Hickey
Campbell, Sim, Marsh, Wakefield, O'Loughlin	Goals	D.O'Brien, Bayley
Marsh, Miller, Job, Johnson, O'Loughlin, Karney, Curnow, Campbell, Patten	Best	R.Williams, D.O'Brien, Gunn, Fisher, Hamilton, Russell, Laschky, Turner, A.Williams

=== Grand Final ===
1916 SAPFL Grand Final
Saturday, 19 August	Port Adelaide	def.	West Torrens	Hindmarsh Oval
3.5 (23); 5.5 (35); 7.10 (52); 7.11 (53)	Q1; Q2; Q3; Final	0.0 (0); 1.7 (13); 1.10 (16); 1.13 (19)	Umpires: A. Hickey
Hayman (3), Dunn (2), Oliver, Perrott	Goals	Johnson
Drew, Hosking, Quinn, Oliver, Lackman, Thomas, Macfarlane, Stone, Lincoln, Taylor, Eaton	Best	Williams, O'Loughlin, G. Hele, Miller, Trembath, Johnson, Marsh
Hindmarsh Oval was the contingency venue for the 1916 SAPFL Grand Final when an agreement with the SACA could not be reached as the Adelaide Oval was the preferred venue of the SAPFL.
