= Cory Gregson =

Australian rules footballer

Personal information
- Full name: Cory Gregson
- Born: 4 September 1996 (age 30)
- Original team: Glenelg (SANFL)
- Draft: No. 47, 2014 national draft
- Height: 175 cm (5 ft 9 in)
- Weight: 79 kg (174 lb)
- Position: Forward

Playing career^{1}
Years	Club	Games (Goals)
2015–2018	Geelong	39 (20)
- ^{1} Playing statistics correct to the end of 2018.

Career highlights
- 2015 AFL Rising Star: nominee; SANFL premiership player: 2019

Cory Gregson (born 4 September 1996) is an Australian rules footballer who played for the Geelong Football Club in the Australian Football League (AFL).

Gregson was drafted with pick 47 in the 2014 AFL draft, and made his debut in the first round of the 2015 AFL season against Hawthorn.

Gregson previously came to media attention in August 2013 when his school, Sacred Heart College, controversially would not permit him to make his league debut with the Glenelg Football Club due to him being required to play in an inter-school game against Rostrevor College. He attended Sheidow Park Primary School in the southern suburbs of Adelaide. In Round 6, 2015 Gregson was nominated for the 2015 AFL Rising Star award after having 18 disposals and 3 goals against Collingwood.

Gregson was delisted at the end of the 2018 season after a long battle with his fitness and getting his injured foot back to full health.

In 2019, Gregson would rejoin Glenelg in the SANFL, where he would play in Glenelg's team that won the 2019 SANFL Grand Final.
