= Henry Eaton =

Henry Eaton may refer to:

- Henry Eaton, 1st Baron Cheylesmore (1816–1891), British businessman, politician, and art collector
- Henry L. Eaton (1834–1890), Wisconsin politician
- Henry Eaton (footballer), Australian rules footballer

== See also ==
- Henry Smith Van Eaton (1826–1898), attorney, politician and military officer
