= South Australian Patriotic Football League =

- Most recent season or competition: 1918
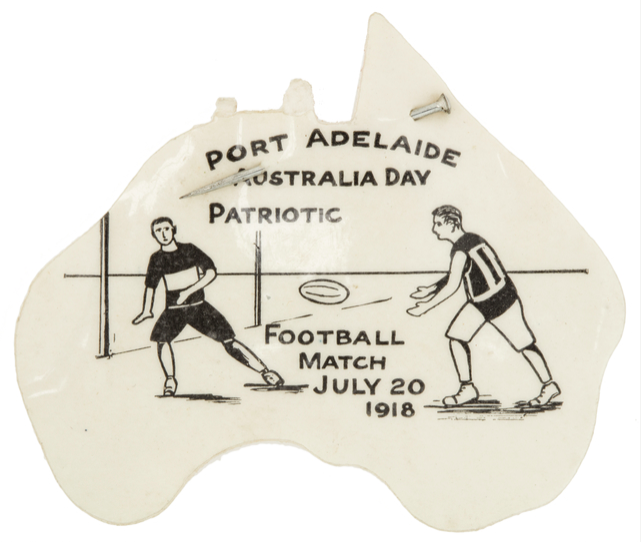
- Sport: Australian rules football
- Founded: 1916
- First season: 1916
- No. of teams: 12 (over 3 season)
- Region: South Australia
- Most recent champions: West Torrens (1918)
- Most titles: Port Adelaide (1916, 1917)

The South Australian Patriotic Football League or Patriotic League was a short lived Australian rules football wartime competition formed during World War I in South Australia to fill the void left by the South Australian Football League (SAFL) which elected to go into recess at the time. Games held were used to raise funds for the war effort. The SAFL was opposed to the formation of the Patriotic League and refused to recognise it during and after World War I.

In the first season of the Patriotic League the competition raised between £350 and £400 for the war effort and Australian soldiers. By 1918 some Patriotic League matches were raising £1,000 per game.

The Patron of the Patriotic League, Francis (Frank) Walter Lundie, and the Delegate for West Adelaide, Albert (Bert) Augustine Edwards, were Councillors for the City of Adelaide in Grey Ward, the area mainly associated with the West Adelaide Football Club (Bert Edwards was their President). Despite being anti-conscription Labor men, they were patriots and supported the war effort.

== Participating teams ==
=== Three seasons ===
- Port Adelaide
- Prospect (Representing the North Adelaide Electorate)
- West Torrens

=== Two seasons ===
- West Adelaide

=== One season ===
- Kenilworth (based at St Marys) - 1918
- Mitcham - 1918
- Norwood - 1916
- St Francis Xavier - 1917
- South Adelaide - 1918
- South Australian Police - 1918
- South Australian Railways - 1915
- Sturt - 1918

== Patriotic League premiers ==
South Australian Patriotic Football League
| Year | Premier | Runner up | Score | Crowd | Ground | Grand Final Date and Match Report |
|---|---|---|---|---|---|---|
| 1916 | Port Adelaide (1) | West Torrens (1) | 7.11 (53) def. 1.13 (19) | | Hindmarsh Oval | 19 August 1916 |
| 1917 | Port Adelaide (2) | West Torrens (2) | 10.12 (72) def. 8.8 (56) | | Alberton Oval | 1 September 1917 |
| 1918 | West Torrens (1) | West Adelaide (1) | 5.13 (43) def. 3.11 (29) | 7,000 | Jubilee Oval | 9 October 1918 |
