= 2019 SANFL season =

- Teams: 10
- Premiers: Glenelg; 5th premiership
- Minor premiers: Glenelg; 6th minor premiership
- Magarey Medallist: Luke Partingon; Glenelg (26 votes)
- Ken Farmer Medallist: Liam McBean; Glenelg (46 goals)
- Highest: 39,105 (Grand Final, Port Adelaide vs Glenelg)

The 2019 South Australian National Football League season (officially the SANFL Statewide Super League) was the 140th season of the South Australian National Football League (SANFL) Australian rules football competition. The season commenced on Friday, 29 March and concluded with the SANFL Grand Final on Sunday, 22 September. Glenelg won their fifth premiership after defeating Port Adelaide by 28 points in the Grand Final, their first flag since 1986.

== Premiership Season ==
=== Round 1 ===
| | Round 1 |
| Friday 29 March (7:20 pm) | Norwood 9.15 (69) | def. | Glenelg 9.10 (64) | Norwood Oval (crowd: 2,786) |
| Friday 29 March (7:20 pm) | West Adelaide 8.6 (54) | def. by | Port Adelaide 11.19 (85) | Richmond Oval (crowd: 1,963) |
| Saturday 30 March (1:10 pm) | South Adelaide 16.6 (102) | def. | Central District 6.7 (43) | Hickinbotham Oval (crowd: 1,770) |
| Saturday 30 March (2:10 pm) | Sturt 8.13 (61) | def. by | Adelaide 14.9 (93) | Unley Oval (crowd: 3,873) |
| Sunday 31 March (1:10 pm) | Woodville-West Torrens 13.12 (90) | def. | North Adelaide 8.17 (65) | Woodville Oval (crowd: 2,816) |

=== Round 2 ===
| | Round 2 |
| Friday 5 April (7:20 pm) | Glenelg 18.7 (115) | def. | Adelaide 9.8 (62) | Glenelg Oval |
| Saturday 6 April (1:10 pm) | North Adelaide 14.11 (95) | def. | West Adelaide 9.12 (66) | Prospect Oval (crowd: 2,437) |
| Saturday 6 April (1:10 pm) | Central District 12.14 (86) | def. by | Norwood 13.11 (89) | Elizabeth Oval (crowd: 2,455) |
| Saturday 6 April (2:10 pm) | Port Adelaide 8.10 (58) | def. by | South Adelaide 14.10 (94) | Alberton Oval (crowd: 1,509) |
| Saturday 6 April (2:40 pm) | Sturt 12.12 (84) | def. | Woodville-West Torrens 11.11 (77) | Unley Oval (crowd: 2,824) |

=== Round 3 ===
| | Round 3 |
| Friday 12 April (7:20 pm) | Norwood 8.10 (58) | def. | Sturt 6.17 (53) | Norwood Oval (crowd: 4,001) |
| Saturday 13 April (1:10 pm) | Woodville-West Torrens 10.17 (77) | def. by | Adelaide 14.16 (100) | Woodville Oval (crowd: 1,847) |
| Saturday 13 April (1:10 pm) | Glenelg 10.10 (70) | drew with | South Adelaide 9.16 (70) | Glenelg Oval (crowd: 2,615) |
| Saturday 13 April (1:10 pm) | Central District 7.12 (54) | def. | West Adelaide 5.4 (34) | Elizabeth Oval (crowd: 1,811) |
| Sunday 14 April (2:10 pm) | Port Adelaide 16.11 (107) | def. | North Adelaide 13.8 (86) | Alberton Oval (crowd: 1,812) |

=== Round 4 ===
| | Round 4 (Easter Weekend) |
| Thursday 18 April (7:20 pm) | Norwood 20.8 (128) | def. | Port Adelaide 14.10 (94) | Norwood Oval (crowd: 3,444) |
| Friday 19 April (1:10 pm) | North Adelaide 9.12 (66) | def. by | Central District 10.13 (73) | Prospect Oval (crowd: 3,012) |
| Friday 19 April (2:10 pm) | West Adelaide 18.8 (116) | def. | Woodville-West Torrens 11.13 (79) | Richmond Oval (crowd: 2,261) |
| Friday 19 April (4:10 pm) | Glenelg 11.13 (79) | def. | Sturt 10.10 (70) | Glenelg Oval (crowd: 4,248) |
| Saturday 20 April (2:40 pm) | South Adelaide 10.13 (73) | drew with | Adelaide 11.7 (73) | Hickinbotham Oval (crowd: 1,901) |

=== Round 5 ===
| | Round 5 (ANZAC Round) |
| Wednesday 24 April (7:20 pm) | West Adelaide 8.10 (58) | def. by | Glenelg 10.14 (74) | Richmond Oval (crowd: 2,217) |
| Thursday 25 April (2:40 pm) | North Adelaide 12.15 (87) | def. by | Norwood 15.11 (101) | Prospect Oval (crowd: 4,374) |
| Saturday 27 April (1:10 pm) | Central District 8.7 (55) | def. by | Adelaide 14.6 (90) | Elizabeth Oval (crowd: 2,024) |
| Saturday 27 April (2:10 pm) | Woodville-West Torrens 9.11 (65) | def. by | Port Adelaide 16.6 (102) | Woodville Oval (crowd: 1,945) |
| Sunday 28 April (2:10 pm) | Sturt 14.8 (92) | def. | South Adelaide 11.4 (70) | Unley Oval (crowd: 3,269) |

=== Round 6 ===
| | Round 6 |
| Friday 3 May (7:30 pm) | Norwood 9.14 (68) | def. by | Adelaide 12.14 (86) | Norwood Oval |
| Saturday 4 May (1:10 pm) | South Adelaide 15.11 (101) | def. | West Adelaide 10.9 (69) | Hickinbotham Oval (crowd: 1,528) |
| Saturday 4 May (2:10 pm) | Port Adelaide 18.11 (119) | def. | Central District 13.7 (85) | Alberton Oval (crowd: 1,793) |
| Saturday 4 May (2:10 pm) | Glenelg 19.9 (123) | def. | Woodville-West Torrens 10.13 (73) | Glenelg Oval (crowd: 2,789) |
| Saturday 4 May (2:40 pm) | Sturt 13.14 (92) | def. | North Adelaide 8.10 (58) | Unley Oval (crowd: 3,042) |

=== State Game ===
| | 2019 State Game |
| Sunday 12 May (2:10 pm) | WAFL 13.15 (93) | def. by | SANFL 16.4 (100) | Optus Stadium (crowd: 11,310) |
Simpson Medal (WAFL): Josh Deluca (Subiaco); Fos Williams Medal (SANFL): Michael Knoll (South Adelaide)

=== Round 7 ===
| | Round 7 |
| Friday 17 May (7:20 pm) | West Adelaide 8.5 (53) | def. by | Sturt 9.18 (72) | Richmond Oval (crowd: 2,062) |
| Saturday 18 May (1:40 pm) | Port Adelaide 16.9 (105) | def. by | Adelaide 18.13 (121) | Alberton Oval (crowd: 1,538) |
| Saturday 18 May (2:10 pm) | Central District 8.12 (60) | def. by | Glenelg 17.7 (109) | Elizabeth Oval (crowd: 1,560) |
| Saturday 18 May (2:10 pm) | Woodville-West Torrens 10.21 (81) | def. | Norwood 10.10 (70) | Woodville Oval (crowd: 1,949) |
| Saturday 18 May (2:10 pm) | North Adelaide 8.14 (62) | def. by | South Adelaide 12.12 (84) | Prospect Oval (crowd: 1,871) |

=== Round 8 ===
| | Round 8 (Split Round) |
| Sunday 26 May (1:10 pm) | Glenelg 15.17 (107) | def. | Port Adelaide 8.10 (58) | Glenelg Oval (crowd: 4,329) |
| Friday 31 May (7:20 pm) | Norwood 19.8 (122) | def. | West Adelaide 10.9 (69) | Norwood Oval (crowd: 2,419) |
| Saturday 1 June (2:10 pm) | North Adelaide 9.11 (65) | def. by | Adelaide 15.6 (96) | Prospect Oval (crowd: 2,067) |
| Saturday 1 June (2:40 pm) | Woodville-West Torrens 12.15 (87) | def. | South Adelaide 6.9 (45) | Woodville Oval (crowd: 1,575) |
| Sunday 2 June (2:10 pm) | Sturt 15.8 (98) | def. | Central District 8.11 (59) | Unley Oval (crowd: 2,604) |

=== Round 9 ===
| | Round 9 (Queen's Birthday) |
| Saturday 8 June (2:10 pm) | Central District 11.8 (74) | def. by | Woodville-West Torrens 15.13 (103) | Elizabeth Oval (crowd: 1,899) |
| Saturday 8 June (2:10 pm) | Port Adelaide 12.13 (85) | def. | Sturt 10.5 (65) | Alberton Oval (crowd: 5,270) |
| Saturday 8 June (2:40 pm) | West Adelaide 10.6 (66) | def. by | Adelaide 10.12 (72) | Richmond Oval (crowd: 1,937) |
| Monday 10 June (2:10 pm) | South Adelaide 13.13 (91) | def. by | Norwood 14.9 (93) | Noarlunga Oval (crowd: 2,191) |
| Monday 10 June (2:10 pm) | Glenelg 18.13 (121) | def. | North Adelaide 12.6 (78) | Glenelg Oval (crowd: 3,685) |

=== Round 10 ===
| | Round 10 |
| Saturday 15 June (1:10 pm) | Woodville-West Torrens 16.11 (107) | def. | West Adelaide 6.11 (47) | Woodville Oval (crowd: 1,460) |
| Saturday 15 June (2:10 pm) | Central District 6.9 (45) | def. by | Adelaide 15.10 (100) | Elizabeth Oval (crowd: 1,955) |
| Sunday 16 June (2:10 pm) | North Adelaide 7.8 (50) | def. by | Sturt 10.10 (70) | Prospect Oval (crowd: 2,518) |
| Sunday 16 June (2:10 pm) | South Adelaide 13.9 (87) | def. | Glenelg 13.5 (83) | Noarlunga Oval (crowd: 1,750) |
| Sunday 16 June (2:40 pm) | Port Adelaide 17.11 (113) | def. | Norwood 10.8 (68) | Alberton Oval (crowd: 3,261) |

=== Round 11 ===
| | Round 11 (Split Round) |
| Saturday 22 June (2:40 pm) | Norwood 13.9 (87) | def. by | Woodville-West Torrens 22.9 (141) | Norwood Oval (crowd: 2,600) |
| Sunday 23 June (2:40 pm) | Glenelg 19.9 (123) | def. | Central District 7.12 (54) | Glenelg Oval (crowd: 2,897) |
| Saturday 29 June (2:10 pm) | Sturt 3.5 (23) | def. by | Adelaide 6.8 (44) | Unley Oval (crowd: 1,227) |
| Saturday 29 June (2:40 pm) | North Adelaide 6.6 (42) | def. by | Port Adelaide 13.6 (84) | Prospect Oval (crowd: 1,249) |
| Sunday 30 June (2:10 pm) | West Adelaide 5.10 (40) | def. by | South Adelaide 9.14 (68) | Richmond Oval |

=== Round 12 ===
| | Round 12 |
| Saturday 6 July (1:10 pm) | Central District 11.13 (79) | def. by | North Adelaide 17.5 (107) | Elizabeth Oval (crowd: 1,535) |
| Sunday 7 July (2:10 pm) | Woodville-West Torrens 11.9 (75) | def. by | Glenelg 14.6 (90) | Woodville Oval (crowd: 1,975) |
| Sunday 7 July (2:10 pm) | Norwood 6.15 (51) | def. by | Adelaide 13.10 (88) | Norwood Oval (crowd: 2,502) |
| Sunday 7 July (2:10 pm) | Port Adelaide 14.15 (99) | def. | West Adelaide 3.4 (22) | Alberton Oval (crowd: 1,544) |
| Sunday 7 July (2:10 pm) | South Adelaide 9.8 (62) | def. by | Sturt 15.8 (98) | Noarlunga Oval (crowd: 1,675) |

=== Round 13 ===
| | Round 13 |
| Saturday 13 July (2:10 pm) | Central District 12.7 (79) | def. by | Sturt 12.12 (84) | Elizabeth Oval (crowd: 1,943) |
| Saturday 13 July (2:10 pm) | South Adelaide 13.11 (89) | def. by | Woodville-West Torrens 14.8 (92) | Noarlunga Oval (crowd: 1,104) |
| Saturday 13 July (2:10 pm) | West Adelaide 6.10 (46) | def. | North Adelaide 6.8 (44) | Richmond Oval (crowd: 1,565) |
| Saturday 13 July (2:40 pm) | Adelaide 10.9 (69) | def. by | Port Adelaide 15.9 (99) | Port Pirie Oval (crowd: 3,460) |
| Sunday 14 July (1:10 pm) | Glenelg 15.10 (100) | def. | Norwood 8.6 (54) | Glenelg Oval (crowd: 2,663) |

=== Round 14 ===
| | Round 14 |
| Saturday 20 July (2:10 pm) | North Adelaide 12.13 (85) | def. | Adelaide 7.17 (59) | Prospect Oval (crowd: 2,162) |
| Saturday 20 July (2:10 pm) | Norwood 15.13 (103) | def. | South Adelaide 7.16 (58) | Norwood Oval (crowd: 1,866) |
| Sunday 21 July (2:10 pm) | Woodville-West Torrens 11.9 (75) | def. by | Central District 15.8 (98) | Woodville Oval (crowd: 1,751) |
| Sunday 21 July (2:10 pm) | Port Adelaide 8.9 (57) | def. by | Glenelg 12.9 (81) | Alberton Oval (crowd: 2,496) |
| Sunday 21 July (2:10 pm) | Sturt 17.10 (112) | def. | West Adelaide 8.2 (50) | Unley Oval (crowd: 2,735) |

=== Round 15 ===
| | Round 15 |
| Saturday 27 July (1:10 pm) | West Adelaide 10.2 (62) | def. by | Central District 11.11 (77) | Richmond Oval (crowd: 1,357) |
| Saturday 27 July (1:10 pm) | Glenelg 15.6 (96) | def. | Adelaide 14.10 (94) | Glenelg Oval (crowd: 4,011) |
| Sunday 28 July (2:10 pm) | Norwood 22.11 (143) | def. | North Adelaide 10.12 (72) | Norwood Oval (crowd: 2,370) |
| Sunday 28 July (2:10 pm) | South Adelaide 10.11 (71) | def. by | Port Adelaide 15.9 (99) | Noarlunga Oval (crowd: 1,641) |
| Sunday 28 July (2:10 pm) | Woodville-West Torrens 8.13 (61) | def. by | Sturt 13.8 (86) | Woodville Oval (crowd: 2,444) |

=== Round 16 ===
| | Round 16 (Split Round) |
| Saturday 3 August (1:10 pm) | Central District 7.7 (49) | def. by | South Adelaide 11.13 (79) | Elizabeth Oval (crowd: 1,545) |
| Sunday 4 August (2:10 pm) | North Adelaide 4.15 (39) | drew with | Glenelg 4.15 (39) | Prospect Oval (crowd: 2,454) |
| Sunday 11 August (1:10 pm) | Sturt 6.14 (50) | def. by | Norwood 17.7 (109) | Unley Oval (crowd: 2,988) |
| Sunday 11 August (1:10 pm) | West Adelaide 5.10 (40) | def. by | Adelaide 15.15 (105) | Richmond Oval (crowd: 1,101) |
| Sunday 11 August (1:10 pm) | Port Adelaide 18.14 (122) | def. | Woodville-West Torrens 8.11 (59) | Alberton Oval (crowd: 1,815) |

=== Round 17 ===
| | Round 17 |
| Friday 16 August (7:20 pm) | Norwood 11.9 (75) | def. by | Central District 13.16 (94) | Norwood Oval (crowd: 2,732) |
| Saturday 17 August (1:10 pm) | Glenelg 17.17 (119) | def. | West Adelaide 6.8 (44) | Glenelg Oval (crowd: 2,580) |
| Sunday 18 August (2:10 pm) | Sturt 4.10 (34) | def. by | Port Adelaide 6.13 (49) | Unley Oval (crowd: 2,066) |
| Sunday 18 August (2:10 pm) | South Adelaide 15.9 (99) | def. | North Adelaide 2.8 (20) | Noarlunga Oval (crowd: 931) |
| Sunday 18 August (2:10 pm) | Woodville-West Torrens 5.10 (40) | def. | Adelaide 4.8 (32) | Woodville Oval (crowd: 4,584) |

=== Round 18 ===
| | Round 18 |
| Friday 23 August (7:20 pm) | West Adelaide 6.14 (50) | def. by | Norwood 10.8 (68) | Richmond Oval |
| Saturday 24 August (2:10 pm) | Central District 8.11 (59) | def. by | Port Adelaide 22.17 (149) | Elizabeth Oval (crowd: 2,625) |
| Saturday 24 August (2:10 pm) | North Adelaide 10.10 (70) | def. | Woodville-West Torrens 8.9 (57) | Prospect Oval (crowd: 1,940) |
| Saturday 24 August (2:10 pm) | South Adelaide 12.11 (83) | def. | Adelaide 12.4 (76) | Noarlunga Oval (crowd: 1,557) |
| Saturday 24 August (2:10 pm) | Sturt 11.11 (77) | def. | Glenelg 9.11 (65) | Unley Oval (crowd: 3,422) |

== Ladder ==
2019 SANFL Ladder
| Pos | Team | Pld | W | L | D | PF | PA | PP | Pts |
|---|---|---|---|---|---|---|---|---|---|
| 1 | Glenelg (P) | 18 | 13 | 3 | 2 | 1658 | 1179 | 58.44 | 28 |
| 2 | Port Adelaide | 18 | 13 | 5 | 0 | 1684 | 1310 | 56.25 | 26 |
| 3 | Adelaide | 18 | 11 | 6 | 1 | 1460 | 1247 | 53.93 | 23 |
| 4 | Sturt | 18 | 11 | 7 | 0 | 1321 | 1201 | 52.38 | 22 |
| 5 | Norwood | 18 | 11 | 7 | 0 | 1556 | 1477 | 51.30 | 22 |
| 6 | South Adelaide | 18 | 9 | 7 | 2 | 1426 | 1307 | 52.18 | 20 |
| 7 | Woodville-West Torrens | 18 | 8 | 10 | 0 | 1439 | 1500 | 48.96 | 16 |
| 8 | Central District | 18 | 5 | 13 | 0 | 1223 | 1664 | 42.36 | 10 |
| 9 | North Adelaide | 18 | 4 | 13 | 1 | 1191 | 1506 | 44.16 | 5 (Note: North Adelaide began the season on –4 premiership points as a result of the 19 man controversy in the 2018 Preliminary Final.) |
| 10 | West Adelaide | 18 | 2 | 16 | 0 | 986 | 1553 | 38.83 | 4 |

Rules for classification: 1) points; 2) percentage; 3) number of points for.
(P) Premiers

== Finals series ==
=== Qualifying and Elimination Finals ===
| | Elimination Final |
| Saturday 31 August (3:20 pm) | Sturt 15.6 (96) | def. by | Norwood 16.14 (110) | Adelaide Oval (crowd: see below) |

| | Qualifying Final |
| Saturday 31 August (7:05 pm) | Port Adelaide 12.13 (85) | def. | Adelaide 8.7 (55) | Adelaide Oval (crowd: 12,473) |

=== Semi-finals ===
| | First Semi-final |
| Sunday 8 September (12:15 pm) | Adelaide 21.13 (139) | def. | Norwood 11.11 (77) | Adelaide Oval (crowd: see below) |

| | Second Semi-final |
| Sunday 8 September (3:15 pm) | Glenelg 11.6 (72) | def. by | Port Adelaide 11.10 (76) | Adelaide Oval (crowd: 11,506) |

=== Preliminary final ===
| | Preliminary Final |
| Sunday 15 September (3:15 pm) | Glenelg 16.9 (105) | def. | Adelaide 11.12 (78) | Adelaide Oval (crowd: 8,974) |

=== Grand Final ===
2019 SANFL Grand Final
Sunday 22 September (3:00 pm) | Port Adelaide | def. by | Glenelg | Adelaide Oval (crowd: 39,105)
0.3 (3); 2.7 (19); 5.8 (38); 6.9 (45) | Q1; Q2; Q3; Final | 4.1 (25); 6.2 (38); 9.5 (59); 11.7 (73) | Umpires: Tom Bryce, Andrew Crosby, Mitch Harris; Jack Oatey Medal: Matthew Snook; Television broadcast: Seven Network
