= 1918 SAPFL season =

1918 Patriotic season
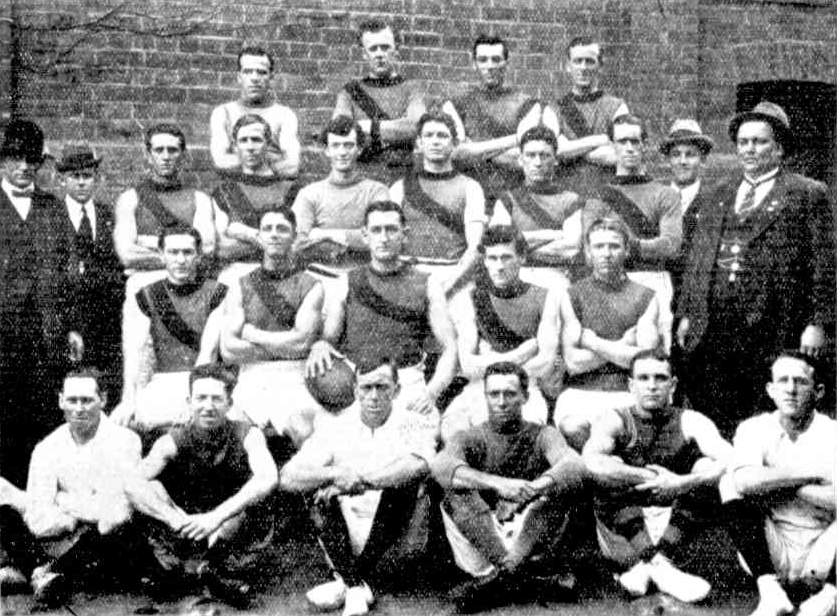
- 3rd SAPFL season Pictured above is the 1918 West Torrens SAPFL premiership team.
- Teams: 9
- Premiers: West Torrens; 1st premiership
- Leading goalkicker: Frank Golding; West Adelaide (85 goals)

The 1918 SAPFL season was the 3rd and final season of the South Australian Patriotic Football League, a competition formed in the absence of the South Australian Football League during World War I. The SAFL was opposed to the formation of the Patriotic League and refused to recognise it during and after World War I.

== Programme of Matches ==
At a meeting of the delegates of the South Australian Patriotic Football Association and outside club delegates who sought affiliation with the association was held on Thursday 28 March 1918. After a lengthy discussion it was unanimously decided that the association should again arrange matches for the upcoming season. It was argued that the fact that the Victorian League and Association were forming again, after having been in retirement for the period of the war (1916 to 1917), proved that football was no more out of place in war time than were horse racing, lawn tennis, golf, or bowls.

The First Round of Matches was published on 10 May 1918. It involved 10 rounds for the 9 teams.

== Ladder ==
1918 SAPFL Ladder
Pos	Team	Pld	W	L	D	PF	PA	PP	Pts
1	West Torrens (P)	15	13	2	0	1065	567	65.26	26
2	Port Adelaide	15	12	2	1	844	689	55.06	25
3	West Adelaide	15	10	4	1	923	644	58.90	21
4	South Adelaide	15	8	7	0	668	676	49.70	16
5	Kenilworth	15	7	7	1	645	643	50.08	15
6	Sturt	15	6	8	1	483	649	42.67	13
7	Mitcham	15	4	11	0	443	798	35.70	8
8	Police	9	2	7	0	314	606	34.13	4
9	Prospect	5	0	5	0	0	0	—	0

Rules for classification: 1) points; 2) percentage; 3) number of points for.
(P) Premiers

Note - Police and Prospect teams both withdrew before the end of the season.

== Final Series ==
=== Second Semi final (1st - Minor Premiers vs 3rd) ===
	1918 Second Semi final
Saturday 29 September	West Torrens 2.12 (24)	def. by	West Adelaide 4.13 (37)	Jubilee Oval (crowd: 3000)

=== Final (Winner of 1st Semi final vs Winner of 2nd Semi final) ===
	1915 Preliminary final
Saturday 5 October	West Adelaide 13.16 (94)	def. by	Port Adelaide 10.13 (73)	Jubilee Oval

=== Grand Final (Challenge) ===
1918 SAPFL Grand Final
Wednesday, 9 October 1918	West Torrens	def.	West Adelaide	Jubilee Oval (crowd: 7,000)
2.3 (15); 4.7 (31); 4.10 (34); 5.13 (43)	Q1; Q2; Q3; Final	1.4 (10); 1.7 (13); 3.10 (28); 3.11 (29)
