= Luke Partington =

Australian rules footballer

Personal information
- Full name: Luke Partington
- Born: 5 March 1997 (age 29)
- Original team: Norwood (SANFL)
- Draft: No. 28, 2015 national draft
- Debut: Round 19, 2017, West Coast vs. Brisbane Lions, at Domain Stadium
- Height: 181 cm (5 ft 11 in)
- Weight: 79 kg (174 lb)

Playing career^{1}
Years	Club	Games (Goals)
2016–2018	West Coast	6 (3)
- ^{1} Playing statistics correct to the end of 2018.

Career highlights
- East Perth best and fairest 2018; Magarey Medal 2019; Glenelg premiership 2019, 2023

Luke Partington (born 5 March 1997) is a former professional Australian rules footballer who played for the West Coast Eagles in the Australian Football League (AFL). He was drafted by West Coast with their first selection and twenty-eighth overall in the 2015 national draft. He made his AFL debut in the sixty-eight-point win against the Brisbane Lions at Domain Stadium in round 19 of the 2017 season.

He tied for the best and fairest in 2018 at East Perth, West Coast's West Australian Football League affiliate at the time, but was delisted by West Coast at the end of the 2018 season. For the 2019 season, Partington would move back to South Australia and join the Glenelg Tigers in the South Australian National Football League. He would cap off his 2019 season by winning the league's best and fairest award, the Magarey Medal. In 2021 he was selected to represent South Australia against Western Australia in their interstate match. Partington has returned to Glenelg for the 2025 SANFL season.
