= University Oval, Adelaide =

Sports venue in North Adelaide, South Australia

University Oval
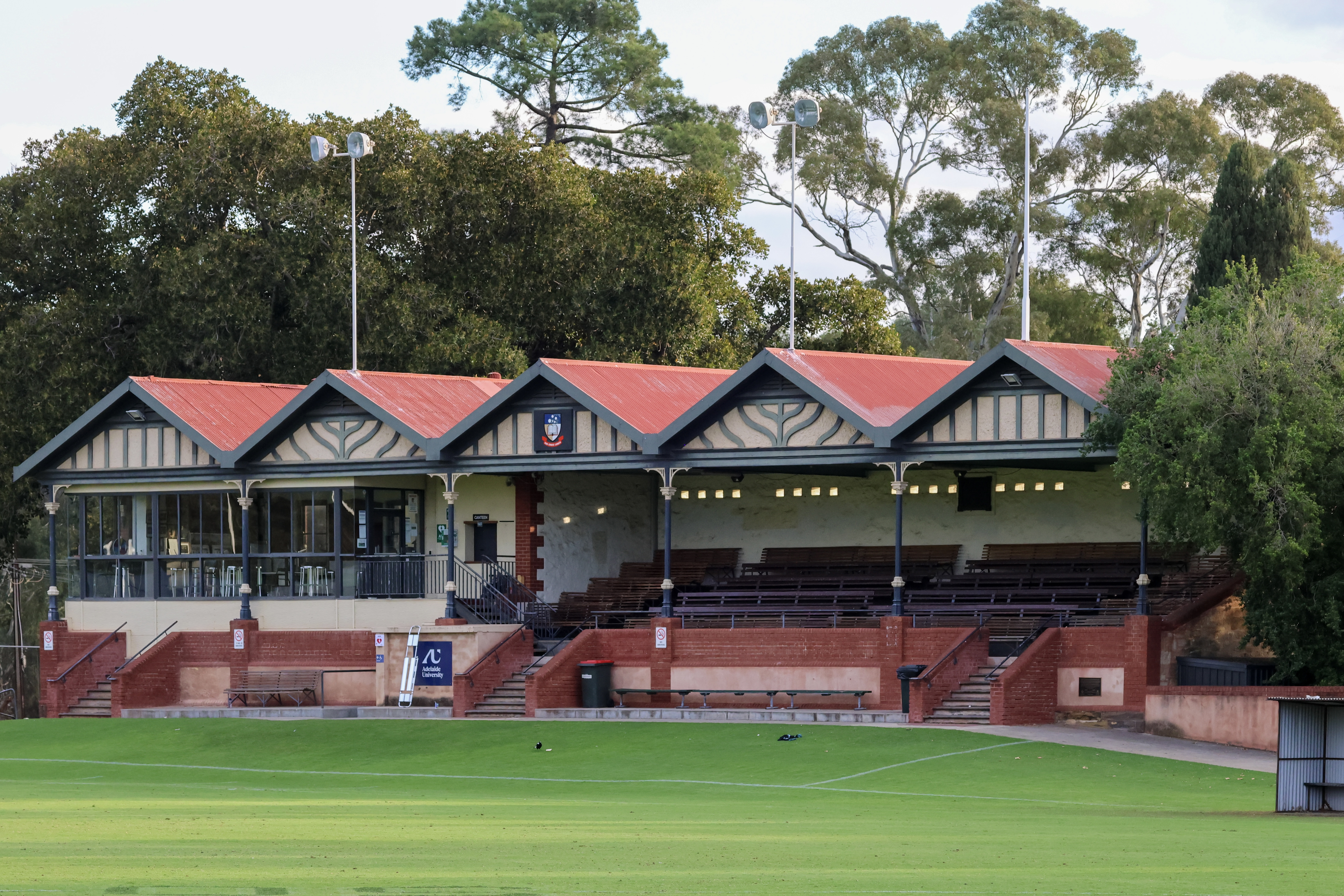
- The main stage in 2026
- Interactive map of University Oval
- Address: War Memorial Drive; North Adelaide, South Australia
- Coordinates: 34°54′51″S 138°36′06″E

University Oval is an Australian rules football and cricket venue located in North Adelaide, which is part of Park 12 in the Adelaide Park Lands. It is the home of the Adelaide University Football Club in the Adelaide Footy League (AdFL) and the Adelaide University Cricket Club in the South Australian Premier Cricket (SAPC) competition.

University Oval comprises University Oval No 1 and No 2 and a variety of soccer and general use fields. The up keep of University Oval is provided by the University of Adelaide as a lease arrangement from the Adelaide City Council. The lease is for:

- 3 x playing fields
- 6 x synthetic practice cricket pitches
- 3 x turf practice cricket pitches
- 3 x tennis courts
- Soccer/ Lacrosse
- Softball/ Tennis
- Cricket/ Touch football
- Australian rules football
