= 1917 SAPFL season =

1917 Patriotic season
- Teams: 4
- Premiers: Port Adelaide; 2nd premiership
- Minor premiers: Port Adelaide; 2nd minor premiership
- Leading goalkicker: Hayman (36 goals); Port Adelaide

The 1917 SAPFL season was the 2nd season of the South Australian Patriotic Football League, a competition formed in the absence of the South Australian Football League during World War I. The SAFL was opposed to the formation of the Patriotic League and refused to recognise it during and after World War I.

== Teams ==
St Francis Football Club - Was formed in 1911 at the Adelaide Catholic Club in connection with the Cathedral District. The club's first coach was ex captain of the South Adelaide Football Club Mr. J. Hansen. The Club competed in the South Australian Amateur Football League from 1911 and folded in 1924.

== Ladder ==
1917 SAPFL Ladder
Pos	Team	Pld	W	L	D	PF	PA	PP	Pts
1	Port Adelaide (P)	9	8	1	0	649	339	65.69	16
2	West Torrens	9	7	2	0	681	402	62.88	14
3	Prospect	9	2	7	0	331	610	35.18	4
4	St Francis Xavier	9	1	8	0	423	680	38.35	2

Rules for classification: 1) points; 2) percentage; 3) number of points for.
(P) Premiers

== Final Series ==
=== Week One – 1st Semi-final ===
West Torrens (2nd) defeated St Francis Xavier (4th)

=== Week two – 2nd Semi-final ===
Port Adelaide (Minor Premiers) defeated Prospect (3rd) at Hindmarsh

=== Grand Final ===
1917 SAPFL Grand Final
Saturday, 1 September 1917	Port Adelaide	def.	West Torrens	Alberton Oval
0.1 (1); 4.3 (27); 7.5 (47); 10.12 (72)	Q1; Q2; Q3; Final	3.1 (19); 4.1 (25); 6.7 (43); 8.8 (56)
