= Harry B. Eaton =

American politician

Harry B. Eaton was a state legislator in North Carolina. He lived in Williamsboro, North Carolina. He was African American. He served in the North Carolina House of Representatives in 1883. He was re-elected to serve a term in 1885 before losing an election for a state senate seat.

He joined the Populist Party. He represented Warren County, North Carolina and Vance County, North Carolina.

== See also ==
- African American officeholders from the end of the Civil War until before 1900
