= Henry Eaton (footballer) =

Australian rules footballer

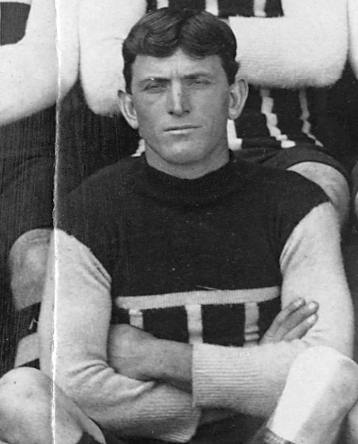

Personal information
- Full name: Henry Eaton
- Born: 24 March 1891; Wallaroo Mines, South Australia
- Died: 18 March 1962 (aged 70); Largs North, South Australia

Playing career
Years	Club	Games (Goals)
1911–1915	Port Adelaide	58 (2)

Career highlights
- 2× Port Adelaide best and fairest (1913, 1915); 2× Port Adelaide premiership player (1913, 1914)

Henry Eaton (24 March 1891 – 18 March 1962) was an Australian rules footballer for the Port Adelaide Football Club.
