= South Australian National Football League =

Australian rules football competition

SANFL
- Most recent season or competition: 2026 SANFL season
- Formerly: South Australian Football Association (1877–1888); South Australian United Football Association (1888–1889); South Australian Football Association (1889–1906); South Australian Football League (1907–1927)
- Sport: Australian rules football
- Founded: 30 April 1877; 149 years ago
- First season: 1877
- CEO: Darren Chandler
- No. of teams: 10
- Region: South Australia
- Most recent champions: Norwood (32nd premiership)
- Most titles: Port Adelaide (36 premierships)
- Broadcaster: Seven Network
- Sponsor: Hostplus
- Website: www.sanfl.com.au

The South Australian National Football League, or SANFL (/ˈsænfəl/ or S-A-N-F-L), is an Australian rules football league based in the Australian state of South Australia. It is also the state's governing body for the sport.

Originally formed as the South Australian Football Association on 30 April 1877, the SANFL is the oldest surviving football league of any code in the world. For most of its existence, the league was considered one of the traditional "big three" Australian rules football leagues, along with the Victorian Football League and West Australian Football League. Since the introduction of two South Australia-based clubs into the Australian Football League – the Adelaide Crows in 1991 and the Port Adelaide Power in 1997 – the popularity and standard of the league has decreased to the point where it is considered a feeder competition to the Australian Football League.

The SANFL has always been a single-division competition, and with the admission of the Adelaide Crows reserves in 2014, the season returned to a 10-team, 18-round home-and-away (regular) season from April to September. The top five teams play off in a final series culminating in the grand final for the Thomas Seymour Hill Premiership Trophy. The grand final had traditionally been held at Football Park in October, generally the week after the AFL Grand Final, though this was altered ahead of the 2014 season, resulting in Adelaide Oval hosting the grand final in the penultimate weekend of September.

The semi-professional league is considered the strongest competition after the fully professional Australian Football League (AFL). The league owned the sub-licences for South Australia's two AFL clubs—Adelaide Football Club and Port Adelaide Football Club—until March 2014, when South Australian Football Commission reached an agreement with the Adelaide and Port Adelaide clubs—endorsed by the AFL—which will see the two AFL licences transferred to the clubs in return for payments totalling more than $18 million.

The league is also responsible for the management of all levels of football in the state. This includes junior football, country football, amateur football and specific programs rolled out across schools, indigenous communities (including the APY Lands in the state's north) and newly arrived migrant communities.

The SANFL owned Football Park, formerly the largest stadium in South Australia. The stadium, which opened in 1974, was primarily used for Australian Football League matches up until 2013 and had a capacity of over 51,000 prior to being demolished. The stadium was the headquarters for the league from 1974 to 2013. The SANFL competition is the second highest attended Australian rules football league behind the AFL.

== History ==
=== Before 1877 ===
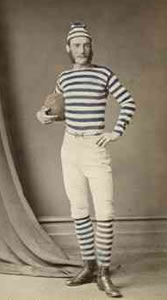
An early football player guernsey and Cap

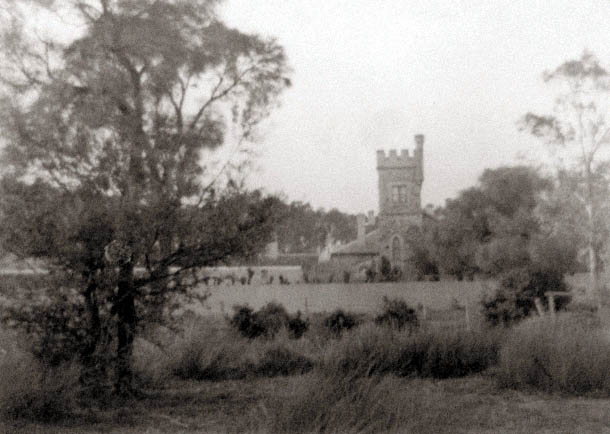
Port Adelaide played its early games at Bucks Flat, Glanville Hall Estate from 1870 to 1879

The first recorded game of any "football" in South Australia was that of 'Caid' played in Thebarton by people of the local Irish community in 1843 to celebrate St Patrick's Day. In 1844, there was debate amongst the South Australian Legislative Council whether it be allowed that "foot-ball" be played on Sundays, with arguments against preferring the quiet worship of God. In 1859, the Gawler Institute ran a rural fete which included a game of football being staged.

The earliest recorded Australian rules football club in South Australia was Adelaide Football Club (unrelated to the modern day Adelaide Football Club), formed in April 1860. An advertisement, sponsored by John Acraman, W.J. Fullarton and R. Cussen noted that group had already gathered 30 members. The club initially only played internal matches between players located North and South of the River Torrens.

By the early 1870s a number of new clubs were formed. In addition to the Old Adelaide Club, Port Suburban (founded in 1868 and renamed Woodville in 1870), Port Adelaide and Young Australians both formed in 1870 and Kensington were the principal clubs that were organising interclub matches.

The early years of interclub football began to be dogged by arguments over which set of rules to adopt. A meeting of three delegates from each of the three clubs—Adelaide, Kensington and Port Adelaide— was held on 10 March 1873, with Charles Kingston from Adelaide voted as chair in an attempted to draw up a standard code of playing rules.

However, after a match between Port Adelaide and Kensington in July 1873, it was remarked that neither side understood the rules clearly. As the years progressed, there became a growing push for uniformity and structure in South Australian football.

On Wednesday 22 March 1876, a meeting of the South Adelaide Football Club, which had formed the previous year, was held at the Arab Steed Hotel. There was a good attendance, and officers and Committee for the season were elected. Dissatisfaction was expressed relative to the rules by which matches were conducted last season, and the Secretary was instructed to communicate with the various Clubs in order to arrange for regulations. It was remarked that scarcely a game was played last season without some misunderstanding arising, some playing by the Old Adelaide Club rules, and others the Kensington Club rules. After a lengthy discussion the meeting adjourned to receive a report from the Secretary and Committee.

Country clubs had also been established at Kapunda (1866), Gawler (1868) and Willunga (1874) and the Adelaide-based clubs would sometimes be hosted by these clubs principally on Public Holidays. These 3 country clubs would also send delegates to the meetings which formed the South Australian Football Association in 1877.

=== 1876: Adoption of standard rules by clubs ===
A meeting of those interested in football was held at the Prince Alfred Hotel on Thursday evening, July 20, 1876, to consider the question of a uniform code of rules to be adopted by the various Clubs. There were 56 persons present, including representatives from the Old Adelaide, South Adelaide, Woodville, and Victorian Clubs. Mr. T. Lotchford presided. Mr. C. C. Kingston, in explaining the object of the meeting, mentioned that a circular had been issued about six weeks previously by the Kensington Football Club, calling upon the Clubs in and around Adelaide to appoint delegates to consider the question of adopting a uniform code of rules. Nothing, however, had followed the issuing of the circular, and the meeting that evening was called in consequence. He was extremely pleased to see so large an attendance, as it augured well for a revival of the manly game, which, owing to what he considered a foolish modification of what were known as the old Adelaide rules, had sadly degenerated. The regulations generally known as the Kensington roles had during the last two seasons in which they had been adopted only provoked continual disputes when matches were engaged in. He was sure they all desired to see the game prosper in the colony, and that by a suitable code of rules encouragement should be given to the exhibition of skill, strength, and pluck, while all matches might be played under a spirit of friendly rivalry, thus making the game enjoyable and interesting not only to players, but to spectators. He then moved that the rules played in Victoria should be considered. They differed but slightly from the old Adelaide rules. If such rules were adopted he felt sure that football would be carried on far more successfully than had been the case lately, and there would be a greater probability of intercolonial matches being arranged, as he hoped would be the case at no distant date. (Applause.) Mr. A. Crooks having seconded the motion, the Melbourne Football Rules were considered seriatim and adopted In their entirety, with the exception of Rules 6, 7, and 8. which were amended in a manner to assimilate somewhat to the old Adelaide rules. An addition to Rule 6 provided that no player having claimed his mark should run with the ball. Rule 7 was struck out, and the following substituted:— " The ball may be taken in hand at any time, but the player shall be liable to be held or thrown until he drops it." An addition to Rule 8 provided that pushing from behind should only be allowable when the player was running. The chief alterations in the game as hitherto played in Adelaide are the dispensing with the cross bar and top rope in favour of two upright posts of unlimited height, and the substitution of an oval football for the round one. Messrs. C. C. Kingston, A. Crooks, J. A. Osborne, T.Letchford, and C. D. Perkins were appointed a Committee to confer with the Secretaries of other Clubs with a view to securing their concurrence in the action taken by the meeting. They were also empowered to consider the question of offering a Challenge Cup for next season. The meeting then closed.

=== 1877–1887: SAFA establishment and the early years ===
In 1877, following an initial meeting called by Richard Twopeny on Thursday 19 April 1877 at Prince Alfred Hotel delegates from 13 of South Australia's football clubs met to develop a uniform set of rules and establish a governing body. The South Australian Football Association was formed at a meeting called at the Prince Alfred Hotel in King William Street, Adelaide on 30 April 1877, and adopted rules similar to those used in Victoria upon the urging of Charles Cameron Kingston. The use of an oval ball, bouncing the ball, and pushing from behind forbidden amongst the rules agreed at the meeting.

The clubs that sent 2 delegates each to the meeting were: South Park, Willunga, Port Adelaide, Adelaide, North Adelaide, Prince Alfred College, Gawler, Kapunda, Bankers, Woodville, South Adelaide, Kensington, and Victorian.

The inaugural 1877 SAFA season was contested by 8 clubs. A total of 4 games were also played by Adelaide and Woodville when they were hosted twice each by the country clubs Gawler and Kapunda on public holidays but these weren't counted in the premiership table at the end of the season. South Adelaide and Victorian were declared joint Club Champions.

In 1878, a brand new club Norwood was formed following the entire collapse of Woodville by a number of former players and it joined the Association for the season.

An end of season match on 31 August between a combined Adelaide Team from the Association against a combined team from the 3 country clubs – Gawler, Kapunda and Willunga was played on the Adelaide Ground. With the Adelaide team winning 5 goals to 1.

In 1880 it was proposed to create a Junior Football Association, similar to the Cricket Association, from Clubs such as the North Parks, St. Peter's College, Prince Alfred College, Royal Parks, West Torrens, Woodville, South Suburban, Hotham, and Middlesex.

In 1881 - Adelaide and Kensington merged at a meeting held on 11 April it was decided that the colour of the merged club be black-and scarlet guernsey, hose, and cap, and navy blue knickerbockers. The SAFA was notified in writing of the amalgamation which was read at a meeting held on 27 April 1881. The merged club played 4 games before resigning on 1 June.

In 1882 - The first general meeting of the committee of the Junior Football Association was held at the Prince Alfred Hotel on Monday evening, March 27. All the clubs - North Parks, North Adelaide Juniors, Kensington, Kent Town, Albion, Triton, and West Torrens were represented. Later some of these clubs would be admitted to the Senior Association - North Parks would merge with North Adelaide Juniors and join as Adelaide in 1885 and West Torrens as West Adelaide in 1887.

In May 1884 - A proposal to merge the senior Association (SAFA) with the Junior Association (called the Adelaide and Suburban Association) was started with 5 delegates from each Association to confer as what steps can be taken but was in the end rejected by the SAFA.

Of the original senior clubs – Bankers (1877), Woodville (1877), Adelaide and Kensington (1881 after merging), South Park (1884), Victorian (1884) - i.e. 6 of the original 8 had all left the competition by the start of the 1885 Season. Only Port Adelaide and South Adelaide hadn't folded or resigned and together with Norwood which had joined in 1878 these 3 senior clubs dominated the competition.

In 1885, a new senior Adelaide Club joined the competition and won the Premiership the following season. The club was formed from a merger of North Adelaide Juniors (which had renamed to Adelaide in 1884) and North Parks. Upon merger and admission the Club took up the Old Adelaide colours of Black and Red.

In 1887 another three Clubs were admitted Hotham and West Adelaide and the only country team ever admitted Gawler Albion but all only lasted for a few seasons.

West Adelaide folded after just one season (1887), their resignation was accepted at the Annual General Meeting held on 5 April 1888, as they were unable to get a team together. At the same meeting permission was given for Hotham to change their name to North Adelaide and for Gawler to remove the word Albion from their name.

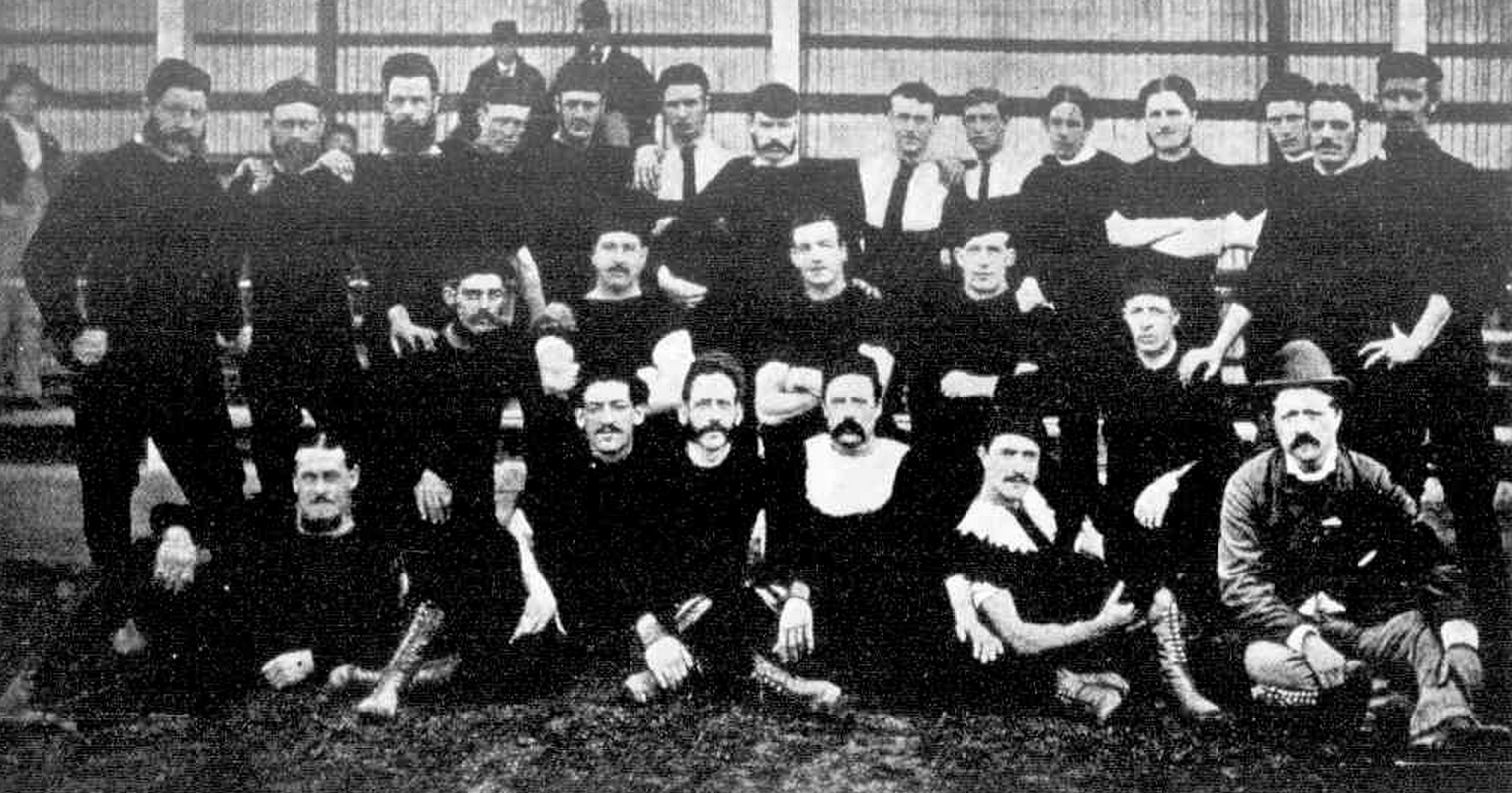
The Norwood Football Club won six premierships in a row from its establishment in 1878 to 1883 (1878 Norwood team pictured).

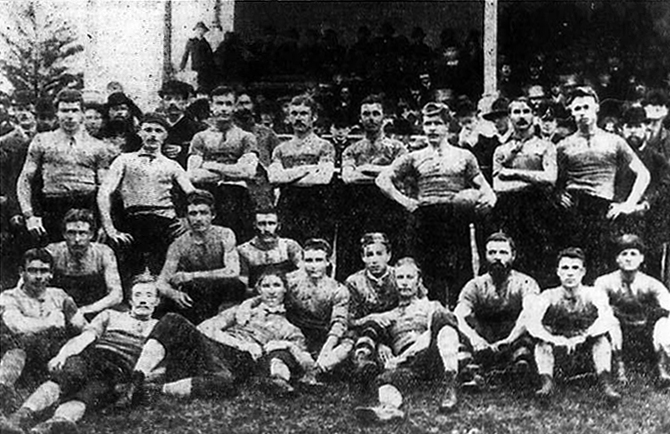
The Port Adelaide Football Club won their first premiership in 1884.(1884 Port Adelaide team pictured).

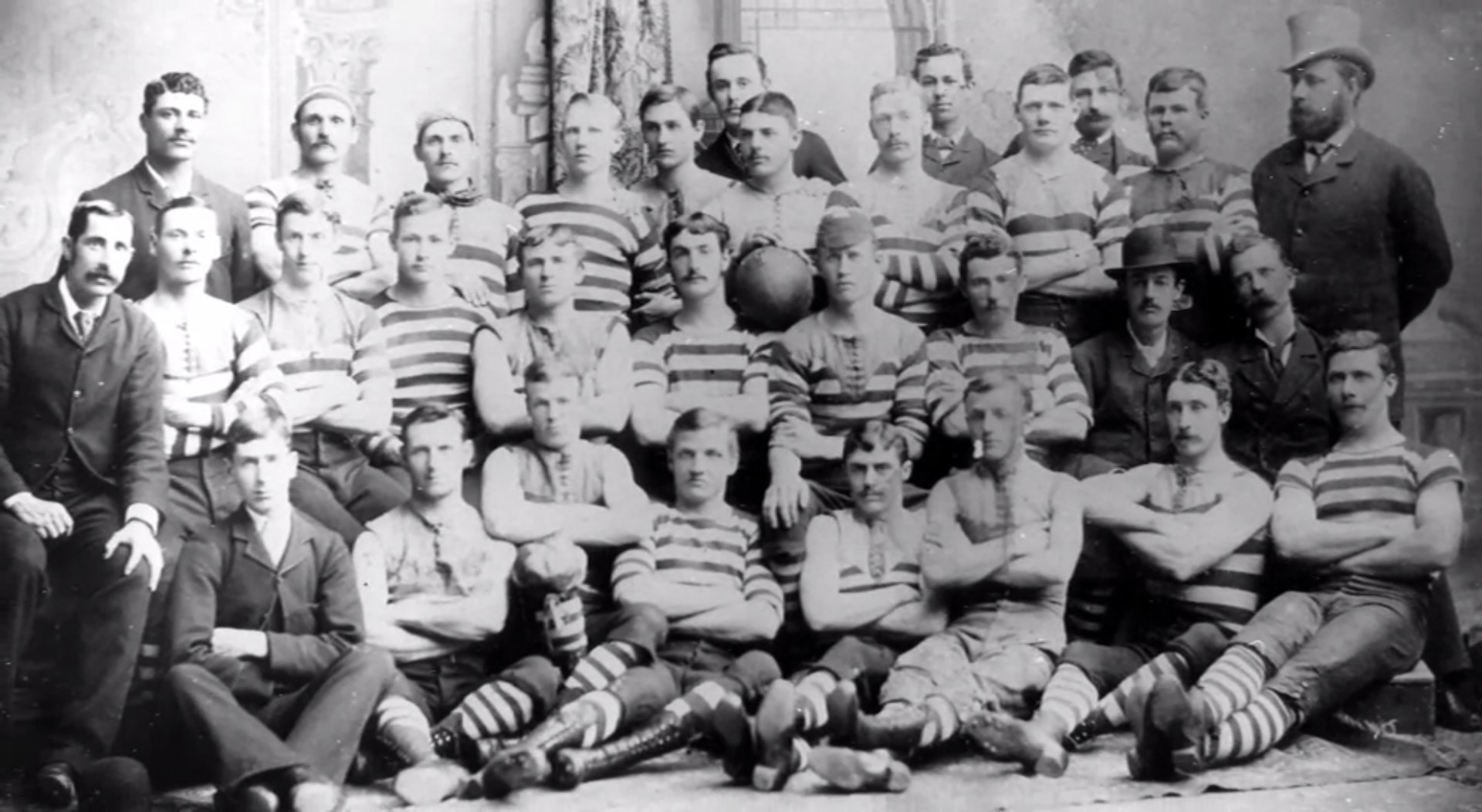
South Adelaide was a strong club in early years winning 8 premierships in the 19th century (1885 South Adelaide team pictured).

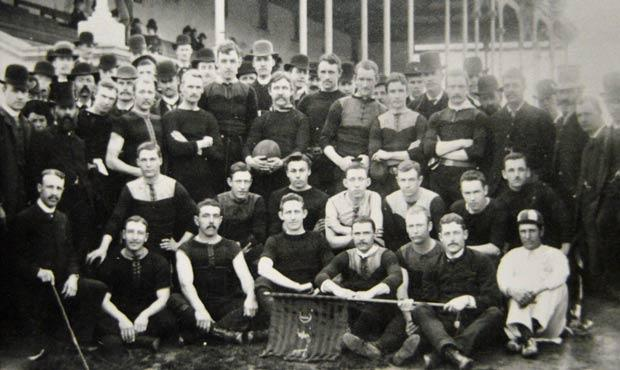
Adelaide's 1886 premiership team.
The club which players were solely South Australians was formed from a merger of two junior clubs in 1885 - North Adelaide Juniors and North Park.

=== 1888–1896 SAFA splinters and re-establishes under new Association and Rules ===
The 1888 SAFA season was started under a cloud, as a dispute arose when the old senior clubs Adelaide, Port Adelaide and South Adelaide all withdrew and resigned from the SAFA and created their own Association and had advertised for other clubs to join them. The split meant Norwood was the only senior club left in the original SAFA along with the two new clubs Gawler and Hotham (renamed North Adelaide) which had just joined the previous year. To settled the dispute the three remaining SAFA clubs were then invited to apply to join this new Association which had a number of new rules.

A junior club Medindie (which would rename itself North Adelaide Football Club in 1893) had applied to join this new United Association but were willing to withdraw their application if this helped resolve the dispute. However, they were accepted along with applications from Norwood, North Adelaide (Hotham) and Gawler and this meant a seven team competition was maintained. Medindie was a foundation member in 1885 of the South Australian Junior Football Association, before spending the 1886 and 1887 seasons competing in the Adelaide and Suburban Football Association.

The first meeting of the United Football Association was held on Wednesday evening 9th May 1888. The result was the old South Australian Football Association being wound up and a new one formed termed 'The South Australian United Football Association'.

Hotham which renamed to North Adelaide for 1888 merged with Adelaide for the 1889 season reducing the competition to six clubs.

On Friday 5 April 1889 At the Annual General Meeting held on Friday 5 April 1889 in the Trades Exchange with all the clubs present the United Football Association renamed itself to South Australian Football Association.

Gawler after its 4th season notified the Association in writing in April 1891 that it would no longer be joining (principally due to being given only 5 home games at Gawler and 10 away games in Adelaide for the 1890 season). In 1889 it had created its own Junior League consisting of 3 clubs. In May 1892, the Gawler Football Association again was affiliated with the SAFA. Subsequently, it tried to rejoin the competition a number of times but was rejected. In 1913, it was admitted but withdrew before the season started.

On 14 March 1893, at a meeting held at Temperance Hall, North Adelaide Medindie renamed itself to North Adelaide Football Club.

In March 1894, Adelaide withdrew from the Association in writing before the season commenced. This reduced the number of senior clubs to just 4 - Port Adelaide, South Adelaide, Norwood and North Adelaide (originally called Medindie).

In March 1895, a new club called Natives applied to join as the 5th Senior Club. It was formed from players from various districts and a group of former Port Adelaide players from a junior club called Port Natives. "The Natives" was adopted so as to prevent any feeling that it was confined to any given locality. Principally the members were drawn from the Port Natives, who were the premiers of the Adelaide and Suburban Association. After initially having their application refused. At a meeting on the 5th April 1895 the Natives then submitted a list of 50 players to show their strength. They were then admitted by 13 votes to 5 against. This new senior club would rename itself and be called West Torrens in 1897 with the introduction of the Electoral System.

In 1896, North Adelaide and the Natives were permitted to field 23 players (3 extra players).

At an Association committee meeting held on 10 August 1896, a proposal was tabled to introduce having no more than eight clubs in the association and that all clubs and any new players be zoned based on the state electoral districts. At an adjourned meeting on Monday 26 Oct 1896, South Adelaide agreed to be zoned to the Electoral of East Adelaide and delegates from the Port Natives Football Club stated they would rename and take the West Torrens District.

=== 1897–1900: Introduction of Electorate District Zoning and other Changes ===
1897 again saw a number of changes, District football based on the State Electoral Districts was introduced optionally with the aim of zoning players to a SAFA club (and became compulsory in 1899) and was the first season of football in South Australia where behinds contributed to the total score, not just goals. (which brought it in to line with the VFA).

On 5 April 1897, The Association approved the application of the current West Adelaide Football Club to join the SAFA from the Suburban Association and The Native Football Club (1895–1896) altered its name to West Torrens Football Club,. Despite the constitution allowing 8 clubs based on the Electoral Districts the Association comprised six clubs until the turn of the century.

The three newer clubs (North, West Adelaide and West Torrens) continued to struggle against the older three clubs (Norwood, Port and South Adelaide). In the First Round both West Adelaide (vs Norwood) and West Torrens (vs Port Adelaide) failed to score for the whole game. There were also a number of walkovers throughout the season when the newer clubs failed to field a team.

In 1898, the Magarey Medal was awarded to the fairest and most brilliant player for the first time.

In 1899, after a period of declining public interest in football due to the long term inequality between the three traditional clubs (Port Adelaide, South Adelaide and Norwood) and the three younger clubs (West Adelaide, West Torrens and North Adelaide), the SAFA introduced electorate football, meaning that players were allocated to clubs based on the district in which they resided. and the playing teams were reduced from 20 to 18.

At a meeting held on Monday 8 May 1899 with a large number of delegates present the Secretary was instructed to write to the Gawler and Port Pirie Associations to inform them that their applications to join the SAFA would not be entertained this year as purely electorate football was being tried.

In mid to late 1900 there was growing interest to form a senior club in the Sturt Electoral District based around Unley to join the SAFA.

In 1900, North Adelaide won the Grand Final against South Adelaide breaking the dominance of the 3 old traditional Clubs – Norwood (11), South Adelaide (8) and Port Adelaide (3) which together had won 22 of the first 23 premierships (1877–1899).

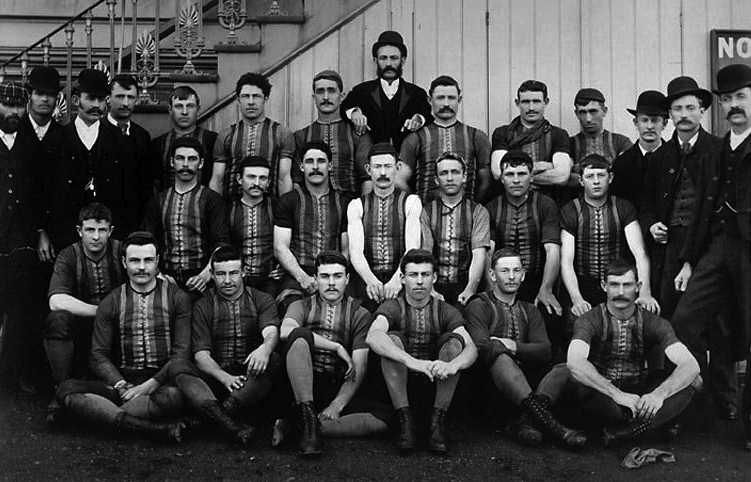
Port Adelaide
(1897 team pictured).

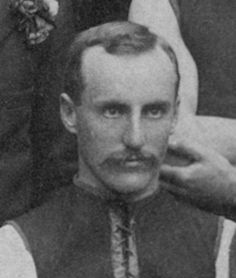
Alby Green from Norwood was the first Magarey Medal winner in 1898.

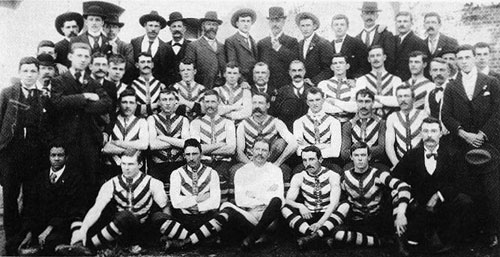
North Adelaide
(1900 team pictured).

=== 1901–1913: Pre war years ===
With the introduction of Clubs being zoned to Electoral Districts South Adelaide lost the dominance it had between 1892 and 1900 (six flags and runner up three times) and was replaced by Norwood and Port Adelaide, who were joined by West Adelaide and North Adelaide; between them, the four clubs won all premierships between 1901 and 1913. West Adelaide followed three straight wooden spoons from 1904 to 1906 with four out of the five premierships from 1908 to 1912 (including Championship of Australia in 1908 and 1913), the most successful period in West Adelaide's history.

The Constitution of the Association allowed up to eight teams based on the State's Electoral Districts and the competition expanded to seven teams when a new football club Sturt formed by the local cricket club joined the Association in 1901 to fill the zone based on the Electoral District of Sturt, but it performed poorly initially, finishing last in its first four seasons.

In 1902, Port Adelaide adopted its now famous black and white colours.

In 1907, the association changed its name to the South Australian Football League.

In 1910 Adelaide University Football Club made an application to enter the competition as the 8th team. This led to players such as Jack Londrigan leaving league clubs such as Sturt in anticipation for a university league team. However the application was ultimately rejected by the competition out of fear a university side would compromise the electorate system, also referred to as zones, introduced to equalise the state competition.

On 2 December 1912, the Gawler Football Association was granted admission to the league to fill the zone based on the vacant 8th Electoral District Barossa. On 3 March 1913 it was confirmed the team would be called Gawler and its colors were registered as follows: Black jersey with pink hoop, white knickers and black-and-pink hose. However, just before the start of the 1913 season the association notified the league in writing that it had to withdraw due to loss of prominent players from their district and the depressed condition of the sport locally.

The University Club, the 1911 and 1912 premiers of the South Australian Amateur Football League (SAAFL), applied to fill the vacancy created by Gawler's withdrawal but was turned down by a unanimous vote of the delegates.

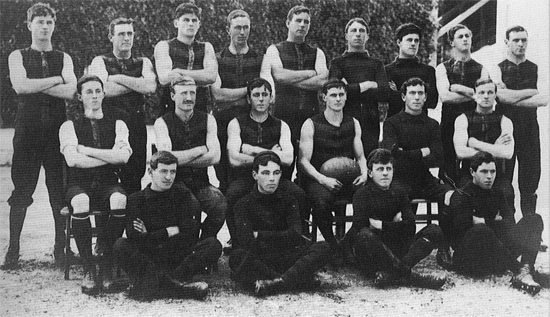
West Adelaide won four SAFL premierships and two Championships of Australia between 1908 and 1912.

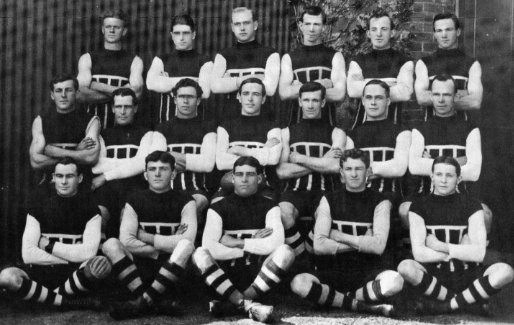
Port Adelaide went through the 1914 SAFL season undefeated.

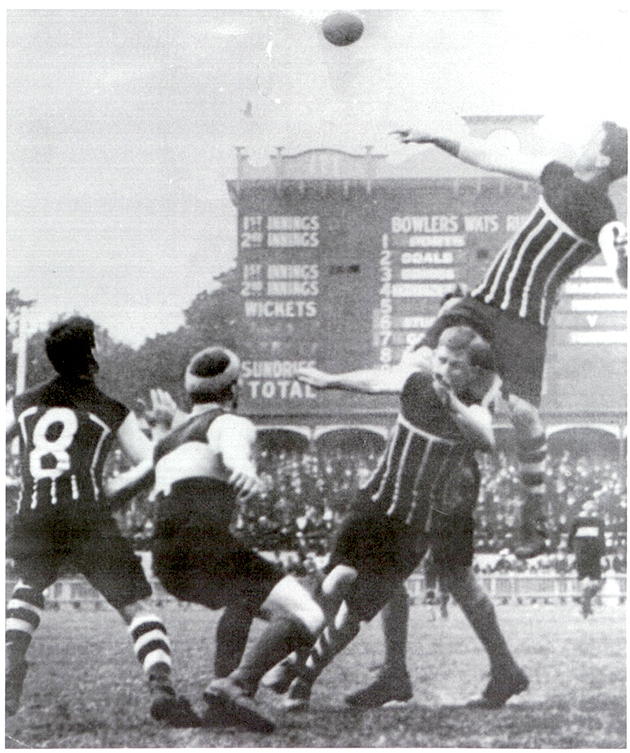
Port Adelaide was Champion of Australia 3 times between 1910 and 1914.

=== 1914–1918: World War I years ===
The SAFL maintained competition for the first two years of World War I, 1914 and 1915, with Sturt winning their first premiership in 1915, but from 1916 the competition was suspended and did not resume until 1919. However, a league competition was formed in 1916 called South Australian Patriotic Football League by the SAFL Clubs and a number of non-AFL Clubs. The league existed for 3 seasons (1916, 1917 and 1918) and Games held were used to raise funds for the war effort. The SAFL was opposed to the formation of the Patriotic League and refused to recognise it during and after World War I.

=== 1919–1941: Inter war years ===
Sturt won the first premiership of the post-World War I era, beating North Adelaide in the Challenge Final replay after a Draw occurred in the 1919 SAFL Grand Final.

At a meeting on Monday 19 April 1920 the SAFL defined that part of Sturt district west of South Road as a new district and admitted a newly formed Glenelg to the B Grade for 1920. It became 8th club in the senior league in 1921 but started poorly with five consecutive wooden spoons.

In 1927, the South Australian Football League was renamed the South Australian National Football League.

Everyone of the 8 clubs won at least one premiership during the 9 years from 1927 to 1935, including Glenelg which their first premiership in 1934 would be the only success in their first 52 years. Prior to World War 2 Port Adelaide won three premierships in the period 1934–1939, appearing in 6 successive grand finals.

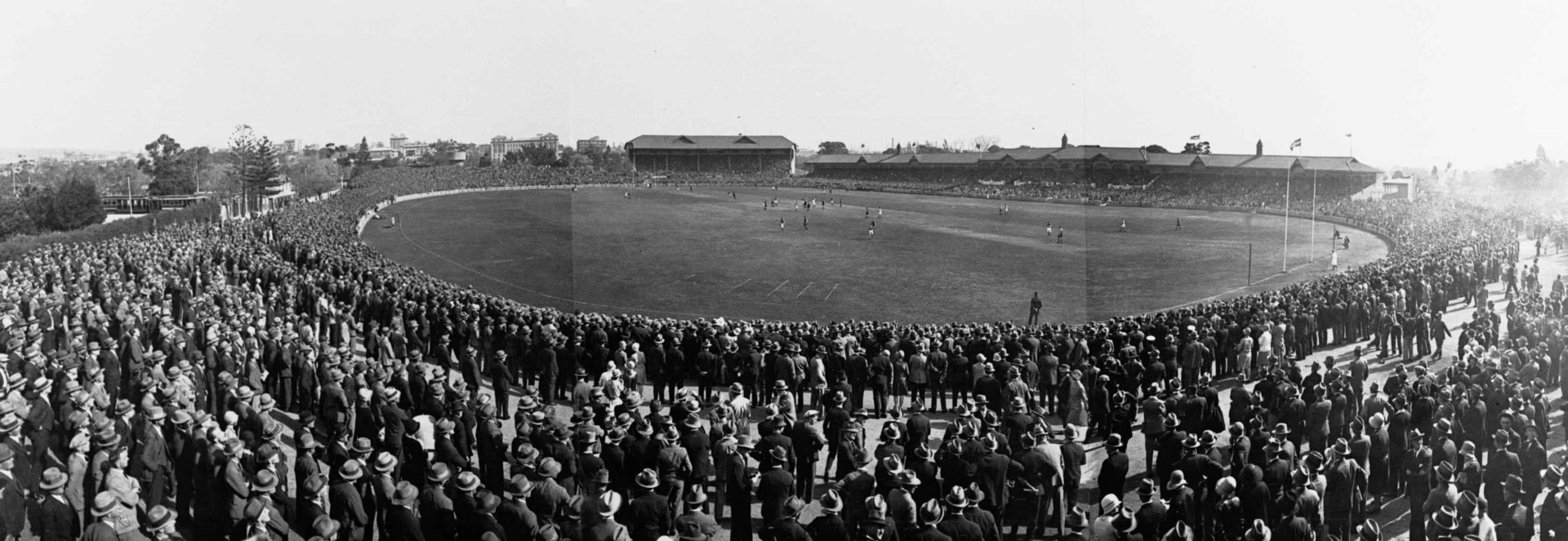
Pictured above is the 1929 SANFL Grand Final between Port Adelaide and Norwood who by this time had well and truly become the league's premier rivals.
See Port Adelaide-Norwood SANFL rivalry.

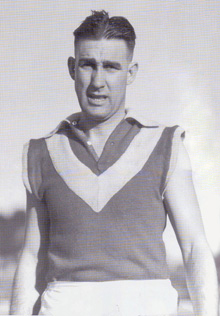
Ken Farmer kicked a record 1,417 goals.

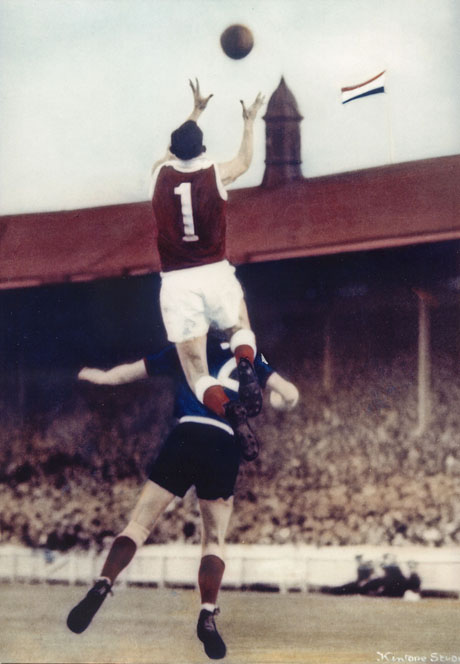
Ian McKay leaps for a spectacular mark in the 1952 SANFL Grand Final

=== 1942–1945: World War II war years ===
The SANFL continued normal competition for the first few years of World War II, but from 1942 to 1944 for 3 seasons the clubs merged on a geographical basis. The competing teams were:
Port-Torrens (Port Adelaide and West Torrens), wearing Port Adelaide colours and known as the Magpies
Norwood-North (Norwood and North Adelaide), wearing North Adelaide colours and known as the Redlegs
Sturt-South (Sturt and South Adelaide), wearing Sturt colours and known as the Blues
West-Glenelg (West Adelaide and Glenelg), wearing Glenelg colours and known as the Tigers

=== 1946–1959: Post World War 2 and Port Adelaide 50s Dominance ===
Post World War 2 was dominated by Norwood who won 3 flags in 5 years between 1946 and 1950. Port Adelaide, led by Fos Williams, dominated the 1950s winning seven premierships, including a record setting six Grand Final wins in a row from 1954 to 1959. This record also matched Norwood's six in a row in 1883, set before the advent of regular Grand Finals.

From early 1949 there was some discussion about expanding the competition to 10 teams due to the growth of metropolitan Adelaide and in particular adding teams from Woodville who had made an application and the outer northern Gawler and Barossa area which had a strong local league and was connected to Adelaide by the train. Previously a country team from Gawler had competed for 4 seasons from 1887 to 1890. South Adelaide were also requesting to consolidate their zone and to be potentially based at Kensington Oval.

On 20 March 1950 Salisbury Football Club made an application to join the SANFL. Applications by Burnside and Woodville were also rejected by the SANFL in June 1950.

In February 1953, The Mayor of Woodville again raised the issue of having a team admitted. Citing a large number of players from West Torrens and Port Adelaide actually resided in the City of Woodville.

In 1954, the tradition of painting the chimney of the West End brewery in Hindley Street, then owned by the South Australian Brewing Company, with the team colours of the SANFL premier and runner-up began, when a West Adelaide player and employee Clarrie Cannon suggested painting the chimney in the West Adelaide colours, red and black, as the brewery was located in their territory. General manager C. R. Aitken agreed, but only if West Adelaide was the winning team that year. However Port Adelaide coach and captain, Fos Williams, said that he expected his team to win, and the men agreed that if Port Adelaide won, their colours would be painted on the chimney. Port Adelaide won that year, so the chimney was painted in black and white vertical stripes, but Williams suggested that a red stripe be painted below the black to honour the runners-up.

=== 1959–1964: Expansion to 10 Teams ===
In 1959, after doubting whether the club was viable as a league team, the SANFL granted South Adelaide a substantial area of the newly developing southern Adelaide suburbs. Also the SANFL finally expanded to 10 teams by admitting a new club Central District based at Elizabeth in the outer north and Woodville an existing amateur league club based in the north west of metropolitan Adelaide. The newly admitted Clubs would play 5 years in the Reserves (B Grade) before joining the A Grade in 1964.

Both new clubs initially performed poorly, especially against the two strongest clubs at the time Sturt and Port Adelaide, and many questioned the purpose of introducing two more teams, in particular Woodville, who were closely surrounded by existing clubs, Port Adelaide and West Torrens and only qualified for the finals on 3 occasions throughout its history.

Central Districts qualified for the finals in 1971, 1972 finishing 3rd in both years losing in the preliminary to Port Adelaide. In 1979 they collected the minor premiership but lost both finals to again finished 3rd.

Woodville qualified for the finals for the first time in 1979 and finished in 5th. Their most successful season was 1986 in which they 3rd which was followed up by a 5th place in 1987.

=== 1962-1970 Port Adelaide and Sturt Domination ===
Port Adelaide continued their dominance of the competition from 1962 with three more premierships in 1962, 1963 and 1965. They would contest 7 successive Grand Finals from 1962 to 1968. Their successive premierships was broken by South Adelaide which went from wooden spooners in 1962 and 1963 to the win the Premiership in 1964 (their first since 1938) by defeating Port Adelaide. In 1965, Port Adelaide exceeded Norwood for the most premierships when they collected their 23rd Cup.

A resurgent Sturt under coach Jack Oatey won five straight premierships from 1966 to 1970, sharing a fierce rivalry with Port Adelaide whom they met in four consecutive Grand Finals from 1965 to 1968.

=== 1970–1979: Golden Era ===
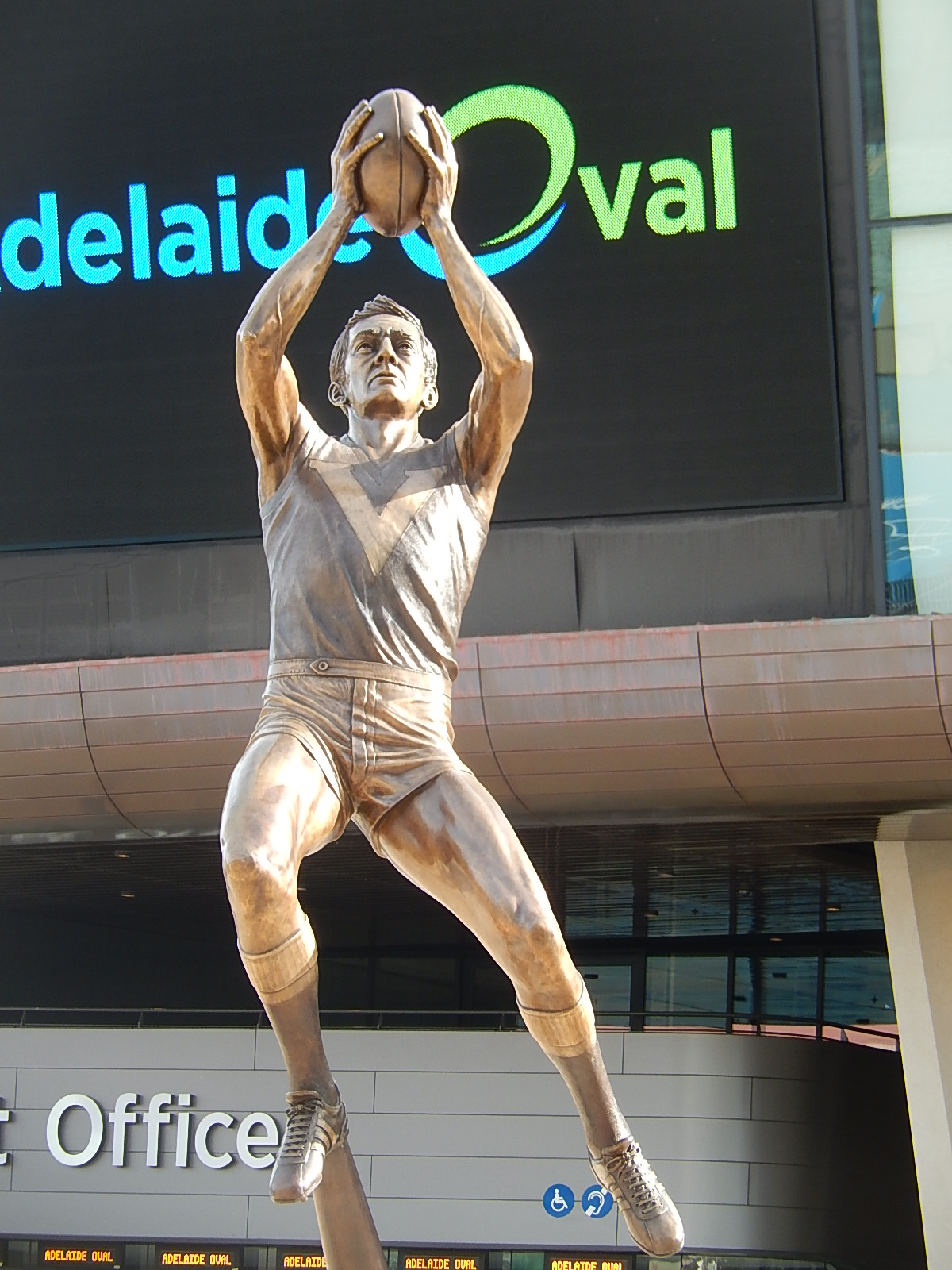
Barrie Robran helped North Adelaide become Champions of Australia in 1972

Sturt began the 1970s by defeating Glenelg in a rain-affected Grand Final by 21 points. North Adelaide secured back-to-back premiership victories over Port Adelaide in 1971 and 1972 and defeated VFL premier Carlton by one point in the end-of-season Championship of Australia match. Glenelg won their 2nd premiership, and first since 1934, defeating North Adelaide by 7 points in 1973 in the highest scoring Grand Final 21.11 (137) to 19.16 (130). Port Adelaide continued their success, winning two premierships themselves (1977, 1979), and finishing lower than 3rd only once for the decade. Other premiership winning clubs in the 1970s were Sturt (1970, 1974, 1976), Glenelg (1973), and Norwood (1975, 1978). On 4 May 1974, Central District and North Adelaide played the first game at newly opened Football Park at West Lakes. SANFL moved its administration to the new stadium, and 58,042 attended the first Grand Final at the ground later that year, with Sturt defeating Glenelg by 15 points despite kicking into a stiff breeze in the last quarter after leading by 5 points at three-quarter time. The 1975 season was highlighted by Glenelg's score of 49.23 (317) against Central District, with a winning margin of 238 points which was larger, at that time, than the previous highest score ever recorded by a side in a single game. In 1976, Sturt defeated Grand Final favourites Port Adelaide by 41 points in front of a record ticketed Football Park crowd of 66,897. Norwood won the 1978 premiership in their centenary year by beating Sturt in the Grand Final by one point after Sturt had lost just one game for the entire season. During the 1970s, an increasing number of SANFL players moved to Victoria to play in the VFL competition.

=== 1980–1989: VFL leaves ANFC and expands whilst SANFL struggles ===
Four clubs Port Adelaide (Premiers 1980,1981,1988,1989 RU 1984), Norwood (Premiers 1982,1984 RU 1980), North Adelaide (Premiers 1987, RU 1985, 1986 & 1989) and Glenelg (Premiers 1985,1986 RU 1981,1982,1987,1988) dominated the SANFL in the 1980s, accounting for nine premierships. The only year being the exception was 1983 when West Adelaide defeated Sturt in the Grand Final for their first premiership since 1961. In the decade between 1979 and 1989 only three clubs, Central District, Woodville, both admitted to the SANFL in 1964, and West Torrens were the only clubs not to reach at least one grand final. The exodus of high quality players to the VFL accelerated in the 1980s. In this same decade only Hawthorn (1983, 1986, 1988 & 1989), Carlton (1979, 1981, 1982 & 1987), Richmond (1980), and Essendon 1984 & 1985) were successful in the VFL. Only Collingwood (1979, 1980 & 1981), Melbourne (1988) and Geelong under first year expat coach and former Woodville player Malcolm Blight (1989) would reach a VFL grand final. In 1981 the VFL rejected a SANFL bid to enter a composite South Australian team to its competition. Night football was introduced in 1984 after floodlights were installed at Football Park.The SANFL introduced a player retention scheme in 1988 in an attempt to maintain the quality of the competition in the face of falling attendances.

The tradition of painting the colours of the premier and runners-up was maintained at the Hindley Street premises of SA Brewing until its closure in 1980, before transferring to the Thebarton site, which was rebadged "West End".

=== 1990–1999: Adelaide and Port Adelaide AFL entry ===
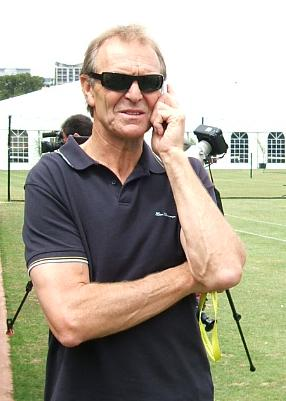
Graham Cornes was Glenelg coach in 1990 and became Adelaide's first coach in the AFL the following year

On 31 July 1990, Port Adelaide surprised the SANFL by making an independent bid to join the AFL. The SANFL was left with little option but to submit its own bid to enter the AFL. In a thirty-minute meeting the SANFL formed the Adelaide Football Club. While Port Adelaide had by far the largest supporter base in South Australia, it could not compete with the SANFL's offer of a composite club, dismantling of the SANFL player retention scheme, dropping of court action against Port Adelaide and the use of Football Park, and in November 1990, following a legal battle (dropped), the AFL announced the Adelaide Football Club had been granted a licence and would enter the competition in 1991.

The Adelaide Football Club, nicknamed the Crows, debuted in 1991 wearing the state colours of navy blue, red and yellow. While the Adelaide Crows enjoyed crowds of over 40,000 every week and dominated local media coverage, crowds at local SANFL matches suffered substantially.

In 1994 after a tender process put to all the SANFL clubs, the Port Adelaide Football Club secured a licence to enter the AFL. Port Adelaide chose the nickname of 'Power' since 'Magpies' was already used by Collingwood. Port Adelaide wished to maintain its presence (as the Magpies) in the SANFL, which was agreed to on the basis that Port Adelaide's SANFL and AFL entities operate independently. The club in the SANFL was renamed "Port Adelaide Magpies Football Club" to reflect this separation.

In 1995, South Adelaide after playing their home games in Adelaide since the formation of the club in 1876 moved to Noarlunga Downs.

Port Adelaide dominated the SANFL in this time, contesting 10 Grand Finals in 12 years between 1988 and 1999 – winning 9 premierships (1988–1990,1992,1994–1996,1998–1999) and losing just the one Grand Final in 1997 to Norwood (their 27th Flag). This Port Adelaide dominance in the period is somewhat of an aberration. It should be kept in context with the hasty formation of the Adelaide Crows in 1991. During this period many of the remaining SANFL clubs' best players were seconded to the Adelaide Crows, whereas the Port Adelaide list was largely left intact due to the conflict that ensued around the Port Adelaide rank-breaking bid to join the expanded VFL competition as a stand-alone club. The Woodville and West Torrens Clubs merged at the end of the 1990 Season and won their first premiership in 1993 against Norwood. Between 1900 and 1999 Port Adelaide contested a total of 59 Grand Finals – winning the flag 33 times to bring their total to 36.

=== 2000–2010: Central District domination ===
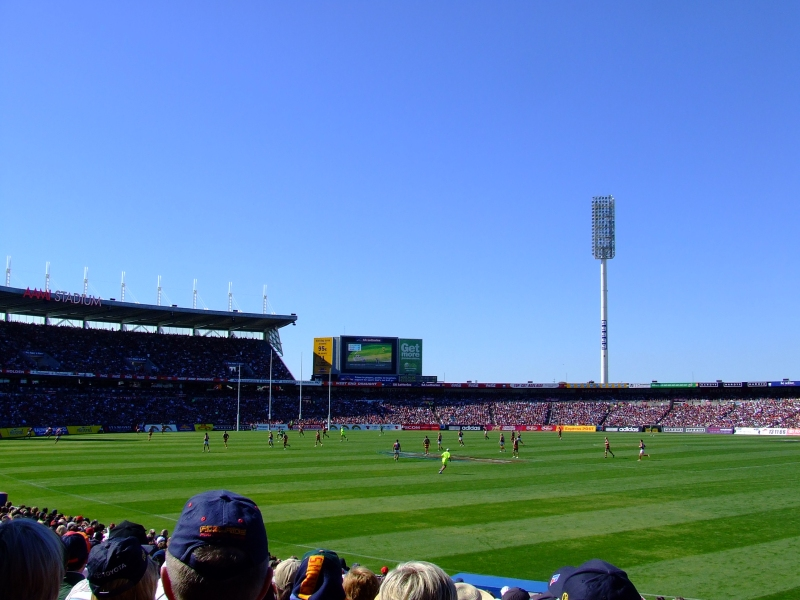
Central District's won nine Grand Finals at Football Park between 2000 and 2010

There was a changing of the guard as the new century started. For more than 100 years one of Port Adelaide, Norwood, North Adelaide or Sturt appeared in every Grand Final. The year 2000 saw the two newest teams Central District and Woodville-West Torrens played off in the Grand Final. Central District appeared in 12 Consecutive Grand Finals from 2000 to 2011, collecting nine premierships (2000–2001, 2003–2005, 2007–2010). Only Sturt (2002) and Woodville-West Torrens (2006 & 2011) interrupted Centrals' run during this period. Centrals played in 28 Finals games between 2000 and 2011 for a total of 25 wins (which included 12 consecutive 2nd Semi Final wins) and just 3 losses (2002,2006,2011 Grand Finals).

Under-age divisions were restructured, with under 17 and under 19 competitions dissolved in favour of under 16 and under 18 leagues, the latter coming into line with Victoria's TAC Cup competition and under the sponsorship of McDonald's would be known as the Macca's Cup. The former would become the Macca's Shield, the season length is around half that of the other levels of competition. Night games would become a feature at Elizabeth Oval, with Central District hosting Saturday night matches from 2006.

=== 2011–2019: Independence for AFL clubs; league returns to Adelaide Oval ===
Central District finished minors again in the 2011 SANFL season and defeated Norwood in the Second Semi-Final for their 12th Consecutive Grand Final appearance but suffered a narrow 3 point loss to Woodville-West Torrens, despite after outscoring the Eagles 4–4 to 1–1 in the last quarter, which brought an end to their dominance in the Grand Finals. The 2012 SANFL season saw Centrals exit the finals for the first time since 2000 without contesting in the Grand Final, this time after finishing 2nd at the end of the minor round with defeats by West Adelaide in the Qualifying and then North Adelaide in the 1st Semi-Final.

The 2012 and 2013 premierships were both won by Norwood, firstly defeating West Adelaide by 49 points to win their 28th flag and then subsequently defeating North Adelaide by 40 points for their 29th flag. This was the first time Norwood had won back to back flags for 90 years when coincidentally they also beat West Adelaide (1922) and North Adelaide (1923).

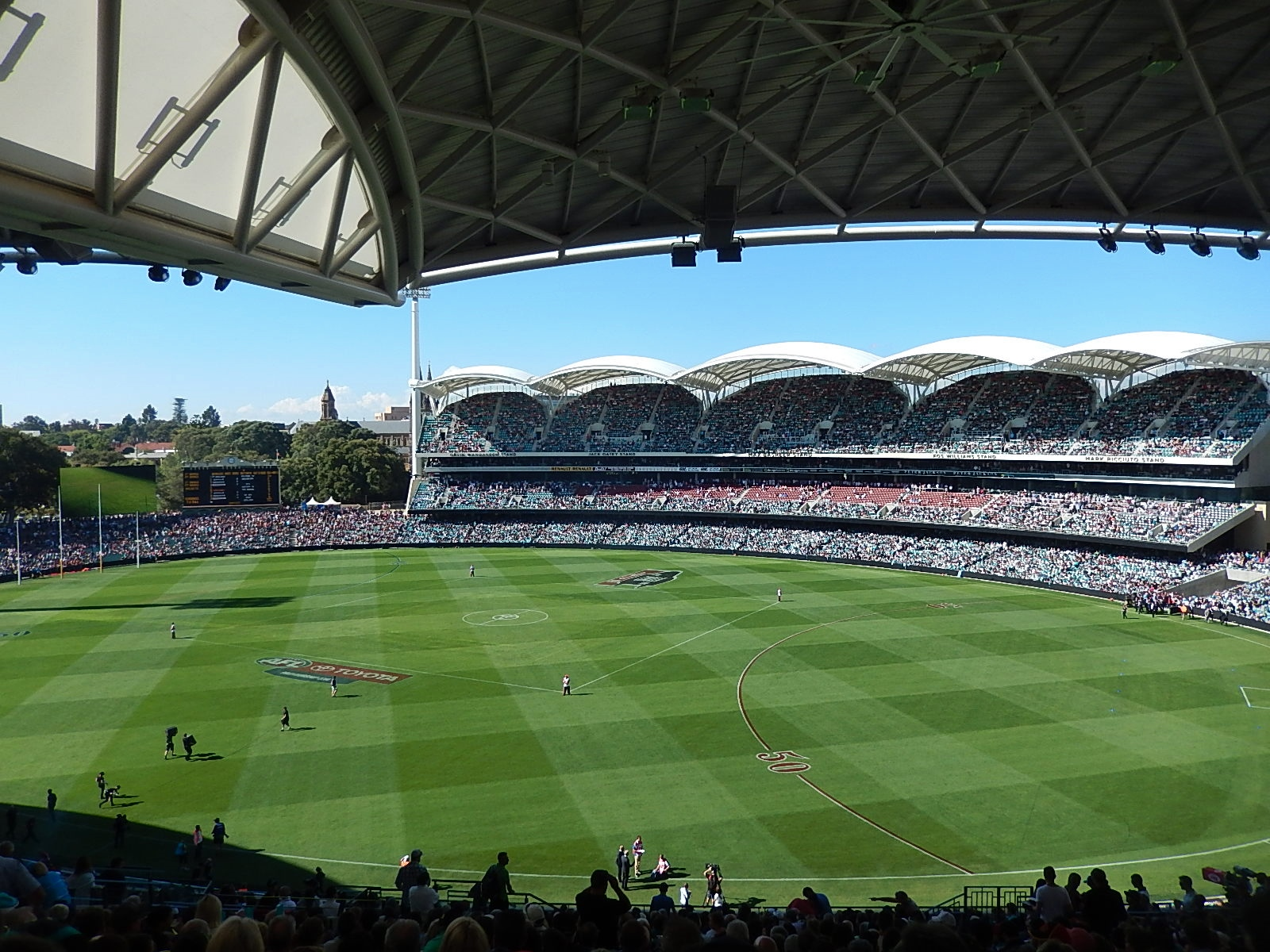
The 2014 SANFL Grand Final was the first since the 1973 SANFL Grand Final that a premiership was decided at Adelaide Oval

With Norwood and Elizabeth's night match experiment largely successful and popular, West Adelaide (2010), South Adelaide (2011) and Glenelg (2012) would follow suit by installing their own lighting systems at their respective grounds while Woodville-West Torrens had hoped to play under lights at Thebarton Oval, which to date have only done so once in 2012 during their premiership defence.

In 2011, AFL-based Port Adelaide and SANFL-based Port Adelaide Magpies merged to address losses at both clubs, however, in 2013 the club announced that the Magpies would officially become the reserves team for Port's AFL players, joining the Adelaide Football Club in fielding a reserves team in the SANFL in time for the 2014 season. These moves caused some furore in some fan circles. The 2013 Grand Final was the last SANFL match at AAMI Stadium, with SANFL league headquarters to remain at AAMI but the finals to return to the new and improved Adelaide Oval from 2014. Ahead of the 2014 season, the AFL-based Adelaide Football Club were granted a licence to field a reserve team in the competition, increasing the number of teams in the league to 10.

As a result of the Magpies becoming the Power's reserve team, and the inclusion of the Crows reserves team in the SANFL in 2014, the other SANFL clubs will lose their AFL contracted players as those contracted to the Crows or Power will move to play exclusively for those clubs in either league. Norwood defeated arch-rivals Port Adelaide Magpies by 4 points in the 2014 Grand Final to secure their 30th Flag and 3rd in a row (2012–2014) for the first time since 1887–89.

Norwood's dominance of the competition would end in the 2015 season, eliminated at the first week of the finals as West Adelaide ended a 32-year premiership drought with their five-goal defeat of Woodville-West Torrens in the Grand Final.

The 2016 and 2017 premierships were both won by Sturt their 14th and 15th Flags and first since 2002.

The 2018 premiership was won by North their 14th Flag and first since 1991. North Adelaide were fined $10,000 and docked four premiership points for next season but allowed to play in the Grand Final against Norwood after a controversial 5 point win in the Preliminary Final against Woodville-West Torrens when they had 19 players on the field during the early stages of the fourth quarter.

The 2019 premiership was won by Glenelg their 5th Flag and first since 1986 ending a 33-year premiership drought. This meant within the last 10 seasons 7 different clubs had won a premiership. Only the two original clubs of the competition South Adelaide (last flag in 1964) and Port Adelaide (last flag in 1999) had not won a premiership flag in at least the last 20 years (excluding the Adelaide Crows reserves team).

=== 2020–present ===
The 2020 SANFL season was originally scheduled to run from April until September; however its commencement was delayed to June 2020 due to the COVID-19 pandemic. The number of clubs participating in the season was reduced to eight, as Adelaide Crows AFL Reserves and Port Adelaide Magpies AFL Reserves were barred from fielding their reserves teams by the Australian Football League. This is the first time in its history that Port Adelaide did not compete in the SANFL. The season was conducted with 14 rounds and a Final Four. Woodville-West Torrens defeated North Adelaide in the Grand Final. This was the last time that the top two teams' colours were painted on the West End brewery's chimney, before that site's closure.

The Woodville West Torrens Eagles were the 2021 SANFL Premiers, after they defeated Glenelg. The tradition of painting a chimney in the two teams' colours continues at the Hoffmann Kiln at the Brickworks Marketplace in nearby Torrensville from 2021, with the cost of the painting continuing to be borne by Lion. but the colours had to be temporarily placed on a replica chimney, as due to high winds it was deemed to unsafe to climb the chimney on the day of the ceremony.

2022

== Clubs ==
=== Current clubs ===
Club	Colours	Moniker	Home venue	Former Competition	Est.	Years in SANFL	Premierships	
Club	Colours	Moniker	Home venue	Former Competition	Est.	Years in SANFL	Total	Recent
Adelaide (R)		Crows	Adelaide Oval, North Adelaide	–	2014	2014-	0	—
Central District		Bulldogs	X Convenience Oval, Elizabeth	SANFL Reserves (1959-1963)	1959	1964-	9	2010
Glenelg		Tigers	Stratarama Stadium, Glenelg East	SANFL Reserves (1920)	1920	1921-	7	2024
North Adelaide		Roosters	Revo Fitness Oval, Prospect	ASFA	1881	1888-	14	2018
Norwood		Redlegs	Coopers Stadium, Norwood	–	1878	1878-	32	2026
Port Adelaide (R)		Magpies	Alberton Oval, Alberton	–	1870	1877-	36	1999
South Adelaide		Panthers	Magain Stadium, Noarlunga Downs	–	1876	1877-	11	1964
Sturt		Double Blues	Thomas Farms Oval, Unley	–	1901	1901-	16	2025
West Adelaide		Bloods	Allied Waste Stadium, Richmond	ASFA	1892	1897-	9	2015
Woodville-West Torrens		Eagles	Maughan Thiem Kia Oval, Woodville South	–	1990	1991-	5	2021

- (R) Denotes that the club is the reserves team of a senior club of the Australian Football League.

On 10 September 2013, Port Adelaide and the SANFL agreed to a model to allow all its AFL-listed players (not selected to play for Port Adelaide Power in the AFL) to play for Port Adelaide Magpies in the SANFL.
The Adelaide AFL Club formed in 1990 created a reserves team in 2014.

- Adelaide (R) and Port Adelaide (R) have played every season except 2020 due to COVID.

=== Uniforms (current clubs) ===
Adelaide	Central District	Glenelg	North Adelaide	Norwood
Port Adelaide	South Adelaide	Sturt	West Adelaide	Woodville-West Torrens

=== Former senior clubs ===
Club	Colours	Moniker	Home venue	Former League	Est.	Years in SANFL	Premierships		Fate
Club	Colours	Moniker	Home venue	Former League	Est.	Years in SANFL	Total	Recent	Fate
Adelaide I	(1877-1880)	None	North Park Lands (now University Oval), North Adelaide	–	1860	1877-1880	0	–	The Old Adelaide Club (revived in 1875) merged with Kensington in April 1881
Adelaide II	(1885-1893)	None	Adelaide Oval	ASJFA	1885	1885-1893	1	1886	Resigned and disbanded at start of 1894
Adelaide-Kensington	Black, Scarlet and Navy Blue	None	North Park Lands (now University Oval), North Adelaide	–	1881	1881	0	–	Resigned after 4 games in 1881 and Adelaide disbanded. Kensington continued as Junior Club until 1885.
Bankers		None	Adelaide (I) Ground (now University Oval), Adelaide	–	1877	1877	0	–	Folded before end of 1877 season (forfeited 6 out of their 15 games)
Gawler		Albions (1887), Athenians, Tigers	Gawler Recreation Oval, Gawler	–	1880	1887-1890	0	–	Withdrew in 1891, attempted to rejoin on multiple occasions (including 1913 when it was admitted and then withdrew before the start of season)
Kensington		None	Kensington Oval, Kensington	–	1871	1877-1880	0	–	Merged with Adelaide (I) in 1881; Joined the Adelaide and Suburban Association in 1882 and dissolved in 1886.
Hotham (North Adelaide (II) 1888)	(1881–87) (1888)	None	Adelaide Oval, North Adelaide	ASFA	1881	1887-1888	0	–	Merged with Adelaide (II) in 1889
Royal Park	orange hoop added in 1882	Roosters	Adelaide Oval, Adelaide	–	1880	1882	0	–	Folded after 5 games in 1882
South Park		None	South Park Lands, Adelaide	–	1877	1877-1884	0	–	Resigned and disbanded at start of 1885
Victorian (North Adelaide (I) 1883-1884)		Tigers	Montefiore Hill, North Adelaide	–	1873	1877-1884	1	1877	Resigned and disbanded at start of 1885
West Adelaide (I) (1887)		Butchers	West Park Lands, Adelaide	ASFA	1878	1887	0	–	Resigned and disbanded at start of 1888
West Torrens (Natives 1895-1896)	(1895-1937) (1938-54, 1974-90) (1955-73)	Eagles	Thebarton Oval, Torrensville	–	1895	1895-1990	4	1953	Merged with Woodville in 1990 to form Woodville-West Torrens
Old Woodville		None	Recreation Ground, Woodville	–	1875	1877	0	–	Folded as senior club at end of 1877 season
Woodville	(1964-67, 1983–90) (1968–82)	Woodpeckers (1964–1982), Warriors (1983–1990)	Woodville Oval, Woodville South	SAAFA	1938	1964-1990	0	–	Merged with West Torrens in 1990 to form Woodville-West Torrens

=== Uniforms (former clubs) ===
Adelaide (1860)	Bankers	Gawler	Hotham (1887)	Kapunda
Kensington	Royal Park	Prince Alfred	South Park	Victorian
West Adelaide (1887)	West Torrens	Willunga	Woodville (1877)	Woodville (II)

=== Former affiliated Country clubs ===
Three country clubs Gawler, Kapunda and Willunga were originally affiliated with the SAFA when it formed in 1877. They did not play in the Home and Away Season but games would be organised by the metropolitan Clubs usually on Public Holidays with the Country Club hosting. Only the Gawler club would eventually compete in the home and away season when it merged with another club in the town in 1887 called Gawler Albion which was formed in 1880.

Club	Colours	Moniker	Home venue	Former League	Est.	Years Affiliated	Fate						
Club	Colours	Moniker	Home venue	Former League	Est.	Years Affiliated	Fate	Gawler	Gawler Recreation Oval, Gawler	–	1869	1877-1890	Merged with Gawler Albion Football Club in 1887 and joined as a senior SAFA Club.
Kapunda		Bombers	Dutton Park, Kapunda	–	1866	1877-1892	Moved to Barossa & Light FA in 1908						
Willunga		Demons	Willunga Recreation Reserve, Willunga South	–	1874	1877-1885	Moved to Southern Football League in 1886						

== Venues ==
Games are generally hosted at suburban grounds throughout Adelaide.

Adelaide	South Australian National Football League is located in Greater Adelaide	Norwood
Adelaide Oval	South Australian National Football League is located in Greater Adelaide	Coopers Stadium
Capacity: 53,583	South Australian National Football League is located in Greater Adelaide	Capacity: 22,000
Prospect	South Australian National Football League is located in Greater Adelaide	Elizabeth
Revo Fitness Oval	South Australian National Football League is located in Greater Adelaide	X Convenience Oval
Capacity: 20,000	South Australian National Football League is located in Greater Adelaide	Capacity: 18,000
Alberton	South Australian National Football League is located in Greater Adelaide	Richmond
Alberton Oval	South Australian National Football League is located in Greater Adelaide	Allied Waste Stadium
Capacity: 17,000	South Australian National Football League is located in Greater Adelaide	Capacity: 16,500
Unley	South Australian National Football League is located in Greater Adelaide	Woodville South
Thomas Farms Oval	South Australian National Football League is located in Greater Adelaide	Maughan Thiem Kia Oval
Capacity: 15,000	South Australian National Football League is located in Greater Adelaide	Capacity: 15,000
Glenelg	South Australian National Football League is located in Greater Adelaide	Noarlunga Downs
Stratarama Stadium	South Australian National Football League is located in Greater Adelaide	Magain Stadium
Capacity: 15,000	South Australian National Football League is located in Greater Adelaide	12,000

=== Former venues ===
- Old Adelaide Ground, North Park Lands (1860-1881) - Old Adelaide's Home Ground - Now University Oval, Adelaide
- Glanville Hall Estate, Semaphore (1870–1879) - Port Adelaide's Home Ground until moving to Alberton Oval in 1880.
- Kensington Oval (1875–1963) - Kensington's Home Ground 1877–1881. Norwood's Home Ground 1882–1897. Also used as a neutral venue by all clubs until 1963.
- South Parklands, Adelaide (1877- 1881) - South Park's Home Ground
- South Terrace (East End), Adelaide - South Adelaide's original Home Ground until moving to Adelaide Oval.
- Montefiore Hill, North Adelaide (1877- 1881) - Victorian's Home Ground.
- East Parklands (1878 to 1881) - Norwood's 1st home ground now the CBC Oval on Bartels Road.
- Gawler Oval (1887–1890) - Gawler's Home Ground (also known as Gawler Recreation Ground)
- Jubilee Oval, Adelaide (1898–1921)
- Hindmarsh Oval (1905–1921) West Torren's Home Ground before moving to Thebarton Oval.
- Thebarton Oval (1922–2012) West Torren's Home Ground until merging with Woodville in 1991.
- Wayville Showground (1927–1939) - West Adelaide's home ground until WWII.
- Football Park, West Lakes (1974–2013) - SANFL Headquarters after moving from Adelaide Oval.
- Bice Oval, Christies Beach (1992–1993)

== League administration ==
The league's revenue is derived from its paid attendance, media and payments from both the Adelaide Crows and Port Adelaide AFL clubs for use of Adelaide Oval.

The SANFL is classed as a semi-professional competition. In 2008 the league had a salary cap of $400,000 (excluding service payments). This is the second highest in Australia for an Australian rules football competition, after the AFL.

The Chief Executive Officer (CEO) of the SANFL is Darren Chandler, who replaced Jake Parkinson in the role in 2020.

The players of the SANFL are represented by the SANFL Players' Association.

== SANFL Ladder ==
South Australian leagues (including the SANFL) award two points for a win, and one for a draw. Elsewhere in Australia generally four points are awarded for a win and two for a draw. In addition percentage is calculated as "For" ÷ "Against" × "100".

== Audience ==
The SANFL match-day program is called the South Australian Football Budget/Football Budget and is sold at all SANFL matches. A special edition is produced for the grand final.

The SANFL competition's "match of the round" was broadcast weekly in South Australia on ABC Southern (ABC1 South Australia). Until early 2008, it was also broadcast nationally on ABC2 television. In 2012, nationwide SANFL match replays resumed on ABC2. Match replays are also available nationally on ABC iView. In 2007, the SANFL measured a record 1,415,000 total television viewers.

The SANFL competition is covered by local radio stations Life FM (live) and 5RPH (live). ABC Local Radio and 5AA broadcast the SANFL Finals Series.

In 2013, the SANFL signed a three-year deal with the Seven Network to broadcast weekly matches on 7mate from the start of the 2014 season. Popular Mix102.3 radio host and Seven News Adelaide sports presenter Mark Soderstrom, former Port Adelaide Magpies captain and 5AA breakfast show personality Tim Ginevar, and former Fox Sports commentator John Casey (who spent time with Seven Adelaide during the 1980s and 1990s) would be the chief callers for the 2014 SANFL season. This marked the league's return to commercial television for the first time since Channel 9 broadcast the SANFL in 1992. The Seven-SANFL partnership was most recently extended in 2026.

=== Attendance ===
Although SANFL crowds now competes heavily with the two AFL national league clubs, the SANFL still has the second highest attendance of any Australian rules football league and the highest attendance for any regional league of any football code. It continues to publish attendance figures.

The record attendance for an SANFL fixture was set at the 1976 SANFL Grand Final between Sturt and Port Adelaide at Football Park which saw 66,987 crammed into the stadium, though some estimate the crowd to have been as high as 80,000 with thousands turned away at the gates. The largest attendance for a minor round fixture was set in Round 19, 1988 for a double header at Football Park. 38,213 fans saw Sturt play Port Adelaide in the early game while reigning premiers North Adelaide faced ladder leaders Central District in the late game. The record suburban ground attendance was an estimated 24,000 who saw Sturt and Norwood at Unley Oval on 9 June 1924. A verified attendance of 22,738 saw Port play Norwood at Alberton in Round 11, 1977*.

* South Adelaide played Port Adelaide in front of 30,618 at the Adelaide Oval in Round 2, 1965. At the time the Adelaide Oval doubled as both league headquarters and South Adelaide's home ground. South Adelaide would move to Hickinbotham Oval in 1995. The Unley Oval record is for current SANFL team home grounds, though the figure was only an estimated amount. Unley Oval's confirmed record attendance of 22,015 was set in Round 9, 1968 for Sturt vs Port Adelaide.

The following are attendance figures since 1991.

Year	H&A	Finals	P	Total	Avg	GF	Ref.
2023	172,162		96			33,049	
2022						27,479	
2021						22,956 (Note: Restricted due to COVID-19 Pandemic in South Australia.)	
2020 (Note: Due to the COVID-19 Pandemic in South Australia, the 2020 season was played with eight teams rather than the usual ten; many games during the Home and Away season were played at the same venue, on the same date, complicating the attendance calculations.)	82,670	32,966	60	115,636	1,927 ▼	17,038 (Note: Restricted due to COVID-19 Pandemic in South Australia.)	
2019			96	<284,000	2,958 ▲	39,105	
2018						40,355	
2017						39,813	
2016	208,081	71,618	96	279,699	2,914 ▲	30,213	
2015	188,562	50,121	96	238,683	2,486 ▼	25,625	
2014	253,201	72,301	96	325,502	3,391 ▲	38,644	
2013	236,163	57,020	96	293,183	3,054 ▼	36,685	
2012	259,242	52,309	96	311,551	3,245 ▼	29,661	
2011	291,209	52,387	96	343,596	3,579 ▼	25,234	
2010	276,583	67,308	96	343,891	3,582 ▲	34,355	

== Awards ==
=== Overview of History of Premiers, Runners-up and Wooden Spooners 1877–2025 ===
See also List of SANFL Premiers and List of SANFL wooden spoons

=== Club ===
The Grand Final winners each season are presented the Thomas Seymour Hill Premiership Trophy, named after administrator Thomas Seymour Hill.

The Stanley H. Lewis Memorial Trophy, awarded annually since 1962, recognises the best combined record in all levels of SANFL competition. The trophy is awarded to the best performed club across six grades of the competition – Men's League, Women's League, Men's Reserves, Boys Under 18, Girls Under 18 and Boys Under 16, w100 points allocated for a Men’s and Women’s League victory, 50 points for the Reserves, Under-18s Boys and U18 Girls and 25 points for the Under-16s. In the event of a draw, half of the points allocated for a win in that grade are awarded to each club involved.

=== Individual ===
The Magarey Medal is awarded to the fairest and most brilliant player in the SANFL each season and is the oldest individual football award in Australia.

The medal was originated by and is named after William Ashley Magarey who, in 1897, was the inaugural chairman of the South Australian Football Association (as the SANFL was then known). In 1898, in an effort to stamp out rough play and improve respect of umpires, Magarey instituted the medal to be awarded to the player deemed by umpires to be the fairest and most brilliant for that season. The inaugural winner of the medal was Norwood's Alby Green. Magarey presented every medal until he died in 1929, with West Adelaide's Robert Snell the last to receive the medal during Magarey's life. The Magarey Medal is still awarded to the fairest and most brilliant SANFL player each season. The Reserves Magarey Medal recognises the standout performers in the seconds or Reserves. It is not unusual for the Reserves Magarey winner to play only half a season in the 'seconds' and the rest of the season in their club's league team.

The Ken Farmer Medal, much like the Coleman Medal in the AFL, is awarded to the league player with the most goals in a season. Named after North Adelaide and South Australia's most prolific goal-kicker Ken Farmer who ended his SANFL career with a still record 1,417 goals, the medal was introduced in 1981 after Farmer's death, with Port Adelaide's Tim Evans winning the inaugural award; Evans kicked 993 goals in premiership matches for the Magpies between 1975 and 1986.

There are also the McCallum and Tomkins Medals, which up until the 2008 season were awarded to the best and fairest players of the U-17 and U-19 divisions respectively. These awards were merged in 2009 when the two under-age competitions were replaced with an U-18's league, similar to those adopted in the West Australian Football League and the VFL's TAC Cup. The first winner of the newly created McCallum–Tomkins Medal was South Adelaide's Luke Bowd.

The Jack Oatey Medal is awarded to the player voted best on ground in the SANFL Grand Final, first awarded in the 1981 premiership decider to Russell Ebert of Port Adelaide. In the same year, the Fos Williams Medal was also commissioned to recognise the standout performer for South Australia in interstate football, the first of which was awarded to Peter Carey of Glenelg.

Despite State of Origin football being dropped from the AFL calendar after 1999, the medal continues to be awarded to the best player for the SANFL representative team in interstate football.

The R.O. Shearman Medal, since its inception in 2000, is awarded to the player voted by the League's senior coaches on a 5–4–3–2–1 basis each game of the home-and-away season.

The Bob Quinn Medal is awarded to the player voted best afield in the Anzac Day matches between the Grand Finalists of the previous year. Commissioned in 2002, the medal was first won by James Gowans of Central District.

Also in 2002, the SANFL created the South Australian Football Hall of Fame to recognise the players, coaches, umpires, administrators and journalists who had made a significant contribution in the SANFL. The inaugural class of 2002 saw 113 inductees into the Hall of Fame and included such greats as Russell Ebert, Ken Farmer, Barrie Robran, Malcolm Blight, Fos Williams, Brian Faehse, Lindsay Head, Neil Kerley, Rick Davies and Jack Oatey.

== SANFL Women's ==
In February 2017, the SANFL followed the example of VFL Women's in Victoria, and created a state-based women's Australian rules football competition replicating its men's league. The SANFLW expanded over the following two years, and is now played by eight of the SANFL clubs between February and May, with Adelaide and Port Adelaide not participating.

Due to the timing of the league, most SANFLW players are not contracted to clubs in the semi-professional AFL Women's national competition, though some AFLW-listed players do play occasional matches for their respective club.

== Other SANFL competitions ==
Aside from the senior SANFL competition, the league has operated a reserves competition since 1919 (such a competition has existed since 1906), and has also operated four underage competitions. Under-19s and Under-17s competitions were run from 1937 and 1939 respectively until 2008, when the league merged these competitions to form the Under-18s competition (initially known as the Maccas Cup) from 2009: it introduced an Under-16s competition the following year.

Neither Adelaide nor Port Adelaide field teams in these competitions. Adelaide has elected not to field teams, while Port Adelaide shut down their underage teams in 2014 and their reserves team in 2018.

For a full list of reserves and under 16–19 premiers, see List of SANFL premiers#Minor grades.

== See also ==
- List of SANFL Clubs
- List of SANFL Grand Finals
- List of SANFL Players
- List of SANFL Premiers
- List of SANFL Records
- List of SANFL Wooden Spoons
- List SANFL Hall of Fame Members
- List of SANFL Magarey Medallists
- South Australia Australian rules football team
