= List of SANFL premiers =

This page is a chronological listing of the premiership winners in the South Australian National Football League (SANFL) – the premier Australian rules football competition in the state of South Australia.

== Chronological list ==
Premiership decided by a Grand Final
Premiership decided by a Grand Final Replay, after the scheduled Grand Final was drawn
Premiership decided by a Challenge Final
Premiership decided without any form of Grand Final

| Year | Premier | Runner-up | Score | Crowd | Ground | Date | Telecaster |
South Australian Football Association (1877-1888)
| 1877 | South Adelaide; Victorian | Joint Champions were declared (with no playoff) | | | | | |
| 1878 | Norwood | Port Adelaide | | | | | |
| 1879 | Norwood (2) | Port Adelaide (2) | | | | | |
| 1880 | Norwood (3) | Victorian | | | | | |
| 1881 | Norwood (4) | South Adelaide | | | | | |
| 1882 | Norwood (5) | South Adelaide (2) | | | | | |
| 1883 | Norwood (6) | Port Adelaide (3) | | | | | |
| 1884 | Port Adelaide | Norwood | | | | | |
| 1885 | South Adelaide (2) | Norwood (2) | | | | | |
| 1886 | Adelaide | South Adelaide (3) | | | | | |
| 1887 | Norwood (7) | Port Adelaide (4) | | | | | |
United Football Association of South Australia (1888-1889)
| 1888 | Norwood (8) + COA (1) | Port Adelaide (5) | | | | | |
South Australian Football Association (1889-1907)
| 1889 | Norwood (9) | Port Adelaide (6) | 7.4 (7) d. 5.9 (5) | 7,227 | Adelaide Oval | Saturday 5 October | |
| 1890 | Port Adelaide (2) + COA (1) | Norwood (3) | | | | | |
| 1891 | Norwood (10) | Port Adelaide (7) | | | | | |
| 1892 | South Adelaide (3) | Port Adelaide (8) | | | | | |
| 1893 | South Adelaide (4) | Norwood (4) | | | | | |
| 1894 | Norwood (11) | South Adelaide (4) | 4.8 (32) drew 4.8 (32) | | Adelaide Oval | Wednesday 6 August | |
| 1894 | Norwood (11) | South Adelaide (4) | 4.7 (31) d. 3.5 (23) (Replay) | 9,000 | Adelaide Oval | Wednesday 13 August | |
| 1895 | South Adelaide (5) | Norwood (5) | | | | | |
| 1896 | South Adelaide (6) | Norwood (6) | | | | | |
| 1897 | Port Adelaide (3) | South Adelaide (5) | | | | | |
| 1898 | South Adelaide (7) | Port Adelaide (9) | 8.8 (56) d. 4.8 (32) | 6,500 | Adelaide Oval | Saturday 10 September | |
| 1899 | South Adelaide (8) | Norwood (7) | 5.12 (42) d. 2.2 (14) | | Adelaide Oval | Saturday 9 September | |
| 1900 | North Adelaide | South Adelaide (6) | 4.3 (27) d. 1.8 (14) | 7,000 | Adelaide Oval | Saturday 8 September | |
| 1901 | Norwood (12) | Port Adelaide (10) | 4.9 (33) d. 4.5 (29) | 7,000 | Adelaide Oval | Saturday 5 October | |
| 1902 | North Adelaide (2) | South Adelaide (7) | 9.14 (68) d. 4.7 (31) | | Adelaide Oval | Saturday 6 September | |
| 1903 | Port Adelaide (4) | South Adelaide (8) | 6.6 (42) d. 5.5 (35) | 14,000 | Adelaide Oval | Saturday 12 September | |
| 1904 | Norwood (13) | Port Adelaide (11) | 9.8 (62) d. 8.10 (58) | 15,000 | Jubilee Oval | Saturday 17 September | |
| 1905 | North Adelaide (3) | Port Adelaide (12) | 6.8 (44) d. 1.6 (12) | 12,000 | Adelaide Oval | Saturday 9 September | |
| 1906 | Port Adelaide (5) | North Adelaide | 8.12 (60) d. 5.9 (39) | 20,000 | Adelaide Oval | Saturday, 15 September | |
South Australian Football League
| 1907 | Norwood (14) + COA (2) | Port Adelaide (13) | 8.7 (55) d. 3.9 (27) | 25,000 | Adelaide Oval | Saturday, 21 September | |
| 1908 | West Adelaide + COA (1) | Norwood (8) | 7.10 (52) d. 6.13 (49) | 22,000 | Adelaide Oval | Saturday, 26 September | |
| 1909 | West Adelaide (2) | Port Adelaide (14) | 7.17 (59) d. 6.5 (41) | 25,000 | Adelaide Oval | Saturday, 18 September | |
| 1910 | Port Adelaide (6) + COA (2) | Sturt | 8.12 (60) d. 5.11 (41) | 20,000 | Adelaide Oval | Saturday, 1 October | |
| 1911 | West Adelaide (3) + COA (2) | Port Adelaide (15) | 7.9 (52) d. 6.10 (46) | 19,000 | Adelaide Oval | Saturday, 30 September | |
| 1912 | West Adelaide (4) | Port Adelaide (16) | 6.10 (46) d. 5.2 (32) | 28,500 | Adelaide Oval | Saturday, 28 September | |
| 1913 | Port Adelaide (7) + COA (3) | North Adelaide (2) | 7.12 (54) d. 5.10 (40) | 22,000 | Adelaide Oval | Saturday 20 September | |
| 1914 | Port Adelaide (8) + COA (4) | North Adelaide (3) | 13.15 (93) d. 1.8 (14) | 11,000 | Adelaide Oval | Saturday 19 September | |
| 1915 | Sturt | Port Adelaide (17) | 6.10 (46) d. 4.10 (34) | 13,000 | Adelaide Oval | Saturday 2 October | |
1916–1918: SANFL suspended due to WWI. Clubs organise charitable Patriotic League competition during war.
| 1919 | Sturt (2) | North Adelaide (4) | 5.9 (39) drew 5.9 (39) | 30,000 | Adelaide Oval | Saturday 27 September | |
| 1919 | Sturt (2) | North Adelaide (4) | 3.5 (23) d. 2.6 (18) (Replay) | 35,000 | Adelaide Oval | Wednesday 8 October | |
| 1920 | North Adelaide (4) | Norwood (9) | 9.15 (69) d. 3.3 (21) | 31,000 | Adelaide Oval | Saturday 18 September | |
| 1921 | Port Adelaide (9) | Norwood (10) | 4.8 (32) d. 3.6 (24) | 34,000 | Adelaide Oval | Saturday 8 October | |
| 1922 | Norwood (15) | West Adelaide | 9.7 (61) d. 2.16 (28) | 31,000 | Adelaide Oval | Saturday 30 September | |
| 1923 | Norwood (16) | North Adelaide (5) | 9.12 (66) d. 6.4 (40) | 37,000 | Adelaide Oval | Saturday 29 September | |
| 1924 | West Torrens | Sturt (2) | 9.12 (66) d. 8.10 (58) | 44,345 | Adelaide Oval | Saturday 27 September | |
| 1925 | Norwood (17) | West Torrens | 8.4 (52) d. 7.9 (51) | 37,750 | Adelaide Oval | Saturday 26 September | |
| 1926 | Sturt (3) | North Adelaide (6) | 9.10 (64) d. 7.9 (51) | 30,000 | Adelaide Oval | Saturday 2 October | |
South Australian National Football League
| 1927 | West Adelaide (5) | North Adelaide (7) | 10.10 (70) d. 8.10 (58) | 33,222 | Adelaide Oval | Saturday 1 October | |
| 1928 | Port Adelaide (10) | Norwood (11) | 15.14 (104) d. 7.14 (56) | 35,700 | Adelaide Oval | Saturday 6 October | |
| 1929 | Norwood (18) | Port Adelaide (19) | 16.14 (110) d. 10.9 (69) | 35,504 | Adelaide Oval | Saturday 5 October | |
| 1930 | North Adelaide (5) | Port Adelaide (20) | 9.13 (67) d. 9.9 (63) | 23,609 | Adelaide Oval | Saturday 4 October | |
| 1931 | North Adelaide (6) | Sturt (3) | 17.13 (115) d. 11.11 (77) | 34,202 | Adelaide Oval | Saturday 3 October | |
| 1932 | Sturt (4) | North Adelaide (8) | 16.14 (110) d. 10.9 (69) | 29,717 | Adelaide Oval | Saturday 1 October | |
| 1933 | West Torrens (2) | Norwood (12) | 13.10 (88) d. 9.11 (65) | 33,444 | Adelaide Oval | Saturday 14 October | |
| 1934 | Glenelg | Port Adelaide (21) | 18.15 (123) d. 16.18 (114) | 30,045 | Adelaide Oval | Saturday 5 October | |
| 1935 | South Adelaide (9) | Port Adelaide (22) | 15.9 (99) d. 13.13 (91) | 26,496 | Adelaide Oval | Saturday 5 October | |
| 1936 | Port Adelaide (11) | Sturt (4) | 13.19 (97) d. 14.10 (94) | 35,120 | Adelaide Oval | Saturday 3 October | |
| 1937 | Port Adelaide (12) | South Adelaide (9) | 13.16 (94) d. 9.16 (70) | 35,895 | Adelaide Oval | Saturday 2 October | |
| 1938 | South Adelaide (10) | Port Adelaide (23) | 23.14 (152) d. 15.16 (106) | 33,364 | Adelaide Oval | Saturday 1 October | |
| 1939 | Port Adelaide (13) | West Torrens (2) | 16.28 (124) d. 11.11 (77) | 44,885 | Adelaide Oval | Saturday 30 September | |
| 1940 | Sturt (5) | South Adelaide (10) | 14.16 (100) d. 11.13 (79) | 28,500 | Adelaide Oval | Saturday 28 September | |
| 1941 | Norwood (19) | Sturt (5) | 14.16 (100) d. 10.11 (71) | 30,742 | Adelaide Oval | Saturday 4 October | |
| 1942 | Port–Torrens | West–Glenelg | 18.12 (120) d. 16.13 (109) | 35,000 | Adelaide Oval | Saturday, 12 September | |
| 1943 | Norwood–North | Port–Torrens | 12.10 (82) d. 8.13 (61) | 42,000 | Adelaide Oval | Saturday 30 September | |
| 1944 | Norwood–North (2) | Port–Torrens (2) | 9.7 (61) d. 7.13 (55) | 30,000 | Adelaide Oval | Saturday 30 September | |
| 1945 | West Torrens (3) | Port Adelaide (24) | 15.25 (115) d. 15.12 (102) | 47,500 | Adelaide Oval | Saturday 29 September | |
| 1946 | Norwood (20) | Port Adelaide (25) | 13.14 (92) d. 9.10 (64) | 53,473 | Adelaide Oval | Saturday 5 October | |
| 1947 | West Adelaide (6) | Norwood (13) | 10.15 (75) d. 5.15 (45) | 32,631 | Adelaide Oval | Saturday 4 October | |
| 1948 | Norwood (21) | West Torrens (3) | 15.16 (106) d. 6.13 (49) | 48,755 | Adelaide Oval | Saturday 2 October | |
| 1949 | North Adelaide (7) | West Torrens (4) | 13.17 (95) d. 9.18 (72) | 42,490 | Adelaide Oval | Saturday 1 October | |
| 1950 | Norwood (22) | Glenelg | 15.16 (106) d. 8.11 (59) | 50,389 | Adelaide Oval | Saturday 30 September | |
| 1951 | Port Adelaide (14) | North Adelaide (9) | 10.12 (72) d. 8.13 (61) | 41,997 | Adelaide Oval | Saturday 29 September | |
| 1952 | North Adelaide (8) | Norwood (14) | 23.15 (153) d. 6.9 (45) | 50,105 | Adelaide Oval | Saturday 4 October | |
| 1953 | West Torrens (4) | Port Adelaide (26) | 9.13 (67) d. 8.12 (60) | 42,949 | Adelaide Oval | Saturday 3 October | |
| 1954 | Port Adelaide (15) | West Adelaide (2) | 11.13 (79) d. 10.16 (76) | 42,895 | Adelaide Oval | Saturday 2 October | |
| 1955 | Port Adelaide (16) | Norwood (15) | 15.11 (101) d. 5.8 (38) | 44,826 | Adelaide Oval | Saturday 1 October | |
| 1956 | Port Adelaide (17) | West Adelaide (3) | 12.9 (81) d. 9.11 (65) | 45,514 | Adelaide Oval | Saturday 29 September | |
| 1957 | Port Adelaide (18) | Norwood (16) | 15.15 (105) d. 13.6 (94) | 61,924 | Adelaide Oval | Saturday 28 September | |
| 1958 | Port Adelaide (19) | West Adelaide (4) | 14.10 (94) d. 14.8 (92) | 54,282 | Adelaide Oval | Saturday 3 October | |
| 1959 | Port Adelaide (20) | West Adelaide (5) | 13.9 (87) d. 11.11 (77) | 48,884 | Adelaide Oval | Saturday 3 October | |
| 1960 | North Adelaide (9) | Norwood (17) | 14.11 (95) d. 13.12 (90) | 54,162 | Adelaide Oval | Saturday 1 October | |
| 1961 | West Adelaide (7) | Norwood (18) | 16.13 (109) d. 11.7 (73) | 40,409 | Adelaide Oval | Saturday 30 September | |
| 1962 | Port Adelaide (21) | West Adelaide (6) | 8.10 (58) d. 7.13 (55) | 43,597 | Adelaide Oval | Saturday 29 September | |
| 1963 | Port Adelaide (22) | North Adelaide (10) | 11.14 (80) d. 6.11 (47) | 52,688 | Adelaide Oval | Friday 5 October | |
| 1964 | South Adelaide (11) | Port Adelaide (27) | 9.15 (69) d. 5.12 (42) | 56,353 | Adelaide Oval | Friday 30 October | |
| 1965 | Port Adelaide (23) | Sturt (6) | 12.8 (80) d. 12.5 (77) | 62,543 | Adelaide Oval | Saturday 2 October | |
| 1966 | Sturt (6) | Port Adelaide (28) | 16.16 (112) d. 8.8 (56) | 59,417 | Adelaide Oval | Saturday 1 October | |
| 1967 | Sturt (7) | Port Adelaide (29) | 13.10 (88) d. 10.17 (77) | 58,849 | Adelaide Oval | Saturday 30 September | |
| 1968 | Sturt (8) | Port Adelaide (30) | 12.18 (90) d. 9.9 (63) | 57,811 | Adelaide Oval | Saturday 28 September | |
| 1969 | Sturt (9) | Glenelg (2) | 24.15 (159) d. 13.16 (94) | 55,600 | Adelaide Oval | Saturday 4 October | |
| 1970 | Sturt (10) | Glenelg (3) | 12.13 (85) d. 9.10 (64) | 48,757 | Adelaide Oval | Saturday 26 September | |
| 1971 | North Adelaide (10) | Port Adelaide (31) | 10.19 (79) d. 9.5 (59) | 52,228 | Adelaide Oval | Saturday 25 September | |
| 1972 | North Adelaide (11) + COA (1) | Port Adelaide (32) | 19.14 (128) d. 10.12 (72) | 55,709 | Adelaide Oval | Saturday 30 September | |
| 1973 | Glenelg (2) | North Adelaide (11) | 21.11 (137) d. 19.16 (130) | 56,525 | Adelaide Oval | Saturday 30 September | |
| 1974 | Sturt (11) | Glenelg (4) | 9.16 (70) d. 8.7 (55) | 58,113 | Football Park | Saturday 28 September | |
| 1975 | Norwood (23) | Glenelg (5) | 9.10 (64) d. 7.10 (52) | 53,283 | Football Park | Saturday 27 September | |
| 1976 | Sturt (12) | Port Adelaide (33) | 17.14 (116) d. 10.15 (75) | 66,897 | Football Park | Saturday 25 September | Seven Network (1) |
| 1977 | Port Adelaide (24) | Glenelg (6) | 17.11 (113) d. 16.9 (105) | 56,717 | Football Park | Saturday 24 September | Seven Network |
| 1978 | Norwood (24) | Sturt (7) | 16.15 (111) d. 14.26 (110) | 60,867 | Football Park | Saturday 30 September | Seven Network (2) |
| 1979 | Port Adelaide (25) | South Adelaide (11) | 9.9 (63) d. 3.14 (32) | 50,428 | Football Park | Sunday 30 September | Nine Network (1) |
| 1980 | Port Adelaide (26) | Norwood (19) | 11.15 (81) d. 9.9 (63) | 54,536 | Football Park | Saturday 4 October | Seven Network (3) |
| 1981 | Port Adelaide (27) | Glenelg (7) | 14.11 (95) d. 6.8 (44) | 52,659 | Football Park | Saturday 3 October | Seven Network (4) |
| 1982 | Norwood (25) | Glenelg (8) | 20.13 (133) d. 9.17 (71) | 47,336 | Football Park | Saturday 2 October | Seven Network (5) |
| 1983 | West Adelaide (8) | Sturt (8) | 21.16 (142) d 16.12 (108) | 47,129 | Football Park | Saturday 1 October | Seven Network (6) |
| 1984 | Norwood (26) | Port Adelaide (34) | 15.10 (100) d. 13.13 (91) | 50,271 | Football Park | Sunday 30 September | Seven Network (7) |
| 1985 | Glenelg (3) | North Adelaide (12) | 21.15 (141) d. 12.12 (84) | 50,289 | Football Park | Saturday 5 October | Seven Network (8) |
| 1986 | Glenelg (4) | North Adelaide (13) | 21.9 (135) d. 12.15 (87) | 50,538 | Football Park | Saturday 4 October | Seven Network (9) |
| 1987 | North Adelaide (12) | Glenelg (9) | 23.7 (145) d. 9.9 (63) | 50,617 | Football Park | Saturday 3 October | Seven Network (10) |
| 1988 | Port Adelaide (28) | Glenelg (10) | 12.12 (84) d. 8.7 (55) | 50,313 | Football Park | Saturday 1 October | Nine Network (1) |
| 1989 | Port Adelaide (29) | North Adelaide (14) | 15.18 (108) d. 1.8 (14) | 50,487 | Football Park | Saturday 7 October | Nine Network (2) |
| 1990 | Port Adelaide (30) | Glenelg (11) | 16.12 (108) d. 13.15 (93) | 50,589 | Football Park | Sunday 7 October | Nine Network (3) |
Adelaide Football Club is formed and enters the AFL
| 1991 | North Adelaide (13) | West Adelaide (7) | 21.22 (148) d. 11.7 (73) | 39,276 | Football Park | Saturday 5 October | ABC Network (1) |
| 1992 | Port Adelaide (31) | Glenelg (12) | 17.3 (105) d. 7.7 (49) | 42,242 | Football Park | Saturday 3 October | Nine Network (4) |
| 1993 | Woodville-West Torrens | Norwood (20) | 17.20 (122) d. 7.7 (49) | 42,719 | Football Park | Saturday 2 October | ABC Network (2) |
| 1994 | Port Adelaide (32) | Woodville-West Torrens | 15.16 (106) d. 10.9 (69) | 40,598 | Football Park | Sunday 2 October | ABC Network (3) |
| 1995 | Port Adelaide (33) | Central District | 13.16 (94) d. 6.10 (46) | 45,786 | Football Park | Sunday 1 October | ABC Network (4) |
| 1996 | Port Adelaide (34) | Central District (2) | 11.14 (80) d. 6.8 (44) | 46,120 | Football Park | Sunday 6 October | ABC Network (5) |
Port Adelaide Football Club enters the AFL
| 1997 | Norwood (27) | Port Adelaide (35) | 19.12 (126) d. 7.11 (53) | 44,161 | Football Park | Sunday 5 October | ABC Network (6) |
| 1998 | Port Adelaide (35) | Sturt (9) | 11.9 (75) d. 9.12 (66) | 44,838 | Football Park | Sunday 4 October | ABC Network (7) |
| 1999 | Port Adelaide (36) | Norwood (21) | 14.17 (101) d. 14.9 (93) | 39,135 | Football Park | Sunday 3 October | ABC Network (8) |
| 2000 | Central District | Woodville-West Torrens (2) | 8.13 (61) d. 5.9 (39) | 34,819 | Football Park | Sunday 1 October | ABC Network (9) |
| 2001 | Central District (2) | Woodville-West Torrens (3) | 10.11 (71) d. 4.8 (32) | 26,378 | Football Park | Sunday 7 October | ABC Network (10) |
| 2002 | Sturt (13) | Central District (3) | 13.14 (92) d. 6.9 (45) | 35,187 | Football Park | Sunday 6 October | ABC Network (11) |
| 2003 | Central District (3) | West Adelaide (8) | 17.9 (111) d. 11.11 (77) | 28,199 | Football Park | Sunday 5 October | ABC Network (12) |
| 2004 | Central District (4) | Woodville-West Torrens (4) | 23.15 (153) d. 4.4 (28) | 24,207 | Football Park | Sunday 3 October | ABC Network (13) |
| 2005 | Central District (5) | Woodville-West Torrens (5) | 15.14 (104) d. 11.10 (76) | 28,637 | Football Park | Sunday 2 October | ABC Network (14) |
| 2006 | Woodville-West Torrens (2) | Central District (4) | 17.19 (121) d. 7.3 (45) | 25,130 | Football Park | Sunday 8 October | ABC Network (15) |
| 2007 | Central District (6) | North Adelaide (15) | 16.11 (107) d. 5.12 (42) | 30,478 | Football Park | Sunday 7 October | ABC Network (16) |
| 2008 | Central District (7) | Glenelg (13) | 17.11 (113) d. 10.11 (71) | 34,128 | Football Park | Sunday 5 October | ABC Network (17) |
| 2009 | Central District (8) | Sturt (10) | 13.14 (92) d. 7.12 (54) | 35,647 | Football Park | Sunday 4 October | ABC Network (18) |
| 2010 | Central District (9) | Norwood (22) | 10.11 (71) d. 9.11 (65) | 34,355 | Football Park | Sunday 3 October | ABC Network (19) |
| 2011 | Woodville-West Torrens (3) | Central District (5) | 12.9 (81) d. 11.12 (78) | 25,234 | Football Park | Sunday 9 October | ABC Network (20) |
| 2012 | Norwood (28) | West Adelaide (9) | 12.7 (79) d. 3.12 (30) | 29,661 | Football Park | Sunday 7 October | ABC Network (21) |
| 2013 | Norwood (29) | North Adelaide (16) | 10.12 (72) d. 4.8 (32) | 36,685 | Football Park | Sunday 6 October | ABC Network (22) |
| 2014 | Norwood (30) | Port Adelaide (36) | 12.10 (82) d. 11.12 (78) | 38,644 | Adelaide Oval | Sunday 21 September | Seven Network (11) |
| 2015 | West Adelaide (9) | Woodville-West Torrens (6) | 11.12 (78) d. 7.6 (48) | 25,625 | Adelaide Oval | Sunday 27 September | Seven Network (12) |
| 2016 | Sturt (14) | Woodville-West Torrens (7) | 12.4 (76) d. 7.7 (49) | 30,213 | Adelaide Oval | Sunday 25 September | Seven Network (13) |
| 2017 | Sturt (15) | Port Adelaide (37) | 7.8 (50) d. 7.7 (49) | 39,813 | Adelaide Oval | Sunday 24 September | Seven Network (14) |
| 2018 | North Adelaide (14) | Norwood (23) | 19.10 (124) d 15.15 (105) | 40,355 | Adelaide Oval | Sunday 23 September | Seven Network (15) |
| 2019 | Glenelg (5) | Port Adelaide (38) | 11.7 (73) d 6.9 (45) | 39,105 | Adelaide Oval | Sunday 22 September | Seven Network (16) |
| 2020 | Woodville-West Torrens (4) | North Adelaide (17) | 13.9 (87) d 7.6 (48) | 17,038 | Adelaide Oval | Sunday 18 October | Seven Network (17) |
| 2021 | Woodville-West Torrens (5) | Glenelg (14) | 15.9 (99) d 4.8 (32) | 22,956 | Adelaide Oval | Sunday 3 October | Seven Network (18) |
| 2022 | Norwood (31) | North Adelaide (18) | 8.11 (59) d 8.10 (58) | 27,479 | Adelaide Oval | Sunday 18 September | Seven Network (19) |
| 2023 | Glenelg (6) | Sturt (11) | 13.8 (86) d 8.14 (62) | 33,049 | Adelaide Oval | Sunday 24 September | Seven Network (20) |
| 2024 | Glenelg (7) | Norwood (24) | 12.9 (81) d 11.10 (76) | 35,129 | Adelaide Oval | Sunday 22 September | Seven Network (21) |
| 2025 | Sturt (16) | Glenelg (15) | 16.9 (105) d 11.8 (74) | 34,426 | Adelaide Oval | Sunday 21 September | Seven Network (22) |
| 2026 | Norwood (32) | Sturt (12) | 13.9 (87) d 11.7 (73) | 38,340 | Adelaide Oval | Sunday 20 September | Seven Network (23) |

== Number of SANFL premierships by club ==
| Club | Colours | Premierships | Runners-up | Top Two Finish | Seasons Competed |
|---|---|---|---|---|---|
| Port Adelaide (R) | | 36 | 38 | 74 | 1877–2019; 2021–2026 |
| Norwood | | 32 | 24 | 56 | 1878–2026 |
| Sturt | | 16 | 12 | 28 | 1901–2026 |
| North Adelaide | | 14 | 18 | 32 | 1888–1892 (Medindie), 1893–2026 |
| South Adelaide | | 11 | 11 | 22 | 1877–2026 |
| West Adelaide | | 9 | 9 | 18 | 1897–2026 |
| Central District | | 9 | 5 | 14 | 1964–2026 |
| Glenelg | | 7 | 15 | 22 | 1921–2026 |
| Woodville-West Torrens | | 5 | 7 | 12 | 1991–2026 |
| West Torrens* | | 4 | 4 | 8 | 1895-96 (Natives), 1897–1990 |
| Victorian* | | 1 | 1 | 2 | 1877–1882, 1883-1884 (North Adelaide) |
| Adelaide (SAFA)* | | 1 | 0 | 1 | 1885–1893** |
| Adelaide (R) | | 0 | 0 | 0 | 2014–2019; 2021–2026 |
| Woodville* | | 0 | 0 | 0 | 1964–1990 |

- * Defunct Clubs
- ** A new senior Adelaide joined in 1885. It was formed from the merger of two junior clubs North Adelaide Juniors (which renamed to Adelaide in 1884) and North Parks both from the Adelaide and Suburban Football Association. It won the premiership in 1886 and resigned from the SAFA before the start of the 1894 Season.
- The original old Adelaide Football Club formed in 1860 and dissolved in 1881 or the Adelaide Football Club (1885-1893) are not related to the current Adelaide Football Club formed in 1990.
- West Torrens merged with Woodville at the end of 1990 season to form Woodville-West Torrens.

== Consecutive SANFL premierships and grand final appearances ==
Only Norwood, Port Adelaide, Sturt and Central District have recorded premiership streaks of three or more in the SANFL.

| Club | Premierships | Sequence | Consecutive Top Two | Sequence of Grand Finals |
|---|---|---|---|---|
| Norwood | 6 | 1878-83 | 8 | 1878-85* |
| Port Adelaide | 6 | 1954-59 | 7 | 1953–59 |
| Sturt | 5 | 1966–70 | 6 | 1965-70 |
| Central District | 4 | 2007–10 | 12 | 2000-2011 |
| Central District | 3 | 2003-05 | 12 | 2000-2011 |
| Central District | 2 | 2000-01 | 12 | 2000-2011 |
| Port Adelaide | 3 | 1994–96 | 6 | 1994-99 |
| Port Adelaide | 2 | 1998-99 | 6 | 1994-99 |
| Norwood | 3 | 1887–89 | 5 | 1887-1891 |
| Norwood | 1 | 1891 | 5 | 1887-1891 |
| Norwood | 3 | 2012-14 | 3 | 2012-14 |
| Port Adelaide | 3 | 1979-81 | 3 | 1979-81 |
| Port Adelaide | 2 | 1913-14 | 7 | 1909-15 |
| Port Adelaide | 2 | 1962-63 | 7 | 1962–68 |
| Port Adelaide | 2 | 1936-37 | 6 | 1934-39 |
| South Adelaide | 2 | 1892-93 | 9 | 1892-1900* |
| South Adelaide | 2 | 1895-96 | 9 | 1892-1900* |
| South Adelaide | 2 | 1898-99 | 9 | 1892-1900* |
| Norwood | 2 | 1922-23 | 4 | 1920-23 |
| Glenelg | 2 | 1985-86 | 4 | 1985-88 |

- Grand Finals only commenced in 1898 (excluding playoffs in 1889 and 1894)
- Norwood won 10 premierships in their first 14 years (1878-1891) including the first 6 in succession which included three runner-ups and a third place in 1886 (in which they would have finished 2nd but a match they won was awarded to South Adelaide as a result of playing a suspended player in the last round when their treasurer forgot to pay the fine.)

=== Grand Final Match Ups ===
Grand Finals only commenced from 1898 (excluding playoffs in 1889 and 1894)

| # | Match-up | Grand Final Appearances | Team(s) Premiership Years | |
| | | | Team(s) | Premiership Years |
|---|---|---|---|---|
| 15 | Port Adelaide vs Norwood | 1889, 1901, 1904, 1907, 1921, 1928, 1929, 1946, 1955, 1957, 1980, 1984, 1997, 1999, 2014 | Port Adelaide | 1921, 1928, 1955, 1957, 1980, 1999 |
| 15 | Port Adelaide vs Norwood | 1889, 1901, 1904, 1907, 1921, 1928, 1929, 1946, 1955, 1957, 1980, 1984, 1997, 1999, 2014 | Norwood | 1889, 1901, 1904, 1907, 1929, 1946, 1984, 1997, 2014 |
| 10 | Port Adelaide vs North Adelaide | 1905, 1906, 1913, 1914, 1930, 1951, 1963, 1971, 1972, 1989 | Port Adelaide | 1906, 1913, 1914, 1951, 1963, 1989 |
| 10 | Port Adelaide vs North Adelaide | 1905, 1906, 1913, 1914, 1930, 1951, 1963, 1971, 1972, 1989 | North Adelaide | 1905, 1930, 1971, 1972 |
| 8 | Port Adelaide vs Sturt | 1910, 1915, 1936, 1965, 1966, 1967, 1968, 1976, 1998, 2017 | Sturt | 1915, 1966, 1967, 1968, 1976, 2017 |
| 8 | Port Adelaide vs Sturt | 1910, 1915, 1936, 1965, 1966, 1967, 1968, 1976, 1998, 2017 | Port Adelaide | 1910, 1936, 1965, 1998 |
| 7 | West Adelaide vs Port Adelaide | 1909, 1911, 1912, 1954, 1956, 1959, 1962 | West Adelaide | 1909, 1911, 1912 |
| 7 | West Adelaide vs Port Adelaide | 1909, 1911, 1912, 1954, 1956, 1959, 1962 | Port Adelaide | 1954, 1956, 1959, 1962 |
| 7 | South Adelaide vs Port Adelaide | 1898, 1903, 1935, 1937, 1938, 1964, 1979 | South Adelaide | 1898, 1935, 1938, 1964 |
| 7 | South Adelaide vs Port Adelaide | 1898, 1903, 1935, 1937, 1938, 1964, 1979 | Port Adelaide | 1903, 1937, 1979 |
| 7 | Port Adelaide vs Glenelg | 1934, 1977, 1981, 1988, 1990, 1992, 2019 | Port Adelaide | 1977, 1981, 1988, 1990, 1992 |
| 7 | Port Adelaide vs Glenelg | 1934, 1977, 1981, 1988, 1990, 1992, 2019 | Glenelg | 1934, 2019 |
| 7 | North Adelaide VS; Norwood | 1920, 1923, 1952, 1960, 2013, 2018, 2022 | North Adelaide | 1920, 1952, 1960, 2018 |
| 7 | North Adelaide VS; Norwood | 1920, 1923, 1952, 1960, 2013, 2018, 2022 | Norwood | 1923, 2013, 2022 |
| 6 | Central District vs Woodville-West Torrens | 2000, 2001, 2004, 2005, 2006, 2011 | Central District | 2000, 2001, 2004, 2005 |
| 6 | Central District vs Woodville-West Torrens | 2000, 2001, 2004, 2005, 2006, 2011 | Woodville-West Torrens | 2006, 2011 |
| 5 | Norwood vs West Adelaide | 1908, 1922, 1947, 1961, 2012 | Norwood | 1922, 2012 |
| 5 | Norwood vs West Adelaide | 1908, 1922, 1947, 1961, 2012 | West Adelaide | 1908, 1947, 1961 |
| 5 | Glenelg vs Sturt | 1969, 1970, 1974, 2023, 2025 | Glenelg | 2023 |
| 5 | Glenelg vs Sturt | 1969, 1970, 1974, 2023, 2025 | Sturt | 1969, 1970, 1974, 2025 |
| 4 | Sturt vs North Adelaide | 1919, 1926, 1931, 1932 | Sturt | 1919 (Replay), 1926, 1932 |
| 4 | Sturt vs North Adelaide | 1919, 1926, 1931, 1932 | North Adelaide | 1931 |
| 4 | Sturt vs North Adelaide | 1919, 1926, 1931, 1932 | Draw | 1919 |
| 4 | North Adelaide vs Glenelg | 1973, 1985, 1986, 1987 | North Adelaide | 1987 |
| 4 | North Adelaide vs Glenelg | 1973, 1985, 1986, 1987 | Glenelg | 1973, 1985, 1986 |
| 4 | Norwood vs Glenelg | 1950, 1975, 1982, 2024 | Norwood | 1950, 1975, 1982 |
| 4 | Norwood vs Glenelg | 1950, 1975, 1982, 2024 | Glenelg | 2024 |
| 3 | West Torrens vs Norwood | 1925, 1933, 1948 | West Torrens | 1933 |
| 3 | West Torrens vs Norwood | 1925, 1933, 1948 | Norwood | 1925, 1948 |
| 3 | West Torrens vs Port Adelaide | 1939, 1945, 1953 | West Torrens | 1945, 1953 |
| 3 | West Torrens vs Port Adelaide | 1939, 1945, 1953 | Port Adelaide | 1939 |
| 3 | Norwood vs Sturt | 1941, 1978, 2026 | Norwood | 1941, 1978, 2026 |
| 3 | Norwood vs Sturt | 1941, 1978, 2026 | Sturt | - |
| 2 | South Adelaide vs Norwood | 1894, 1899 | South Adelaide | 1899 |
| 2 | South Adelaide vs Norwood | 1894, 1899 | Norwood | 1894 (Replay) |
| 2 | South Adelaide vs Norwood | 1894, 1899 | Draw | 1894 |
| 2 | North Adelaide vs South Adelaide | 1900, 1902 | North Adelaide | 1900, 1902 |
| 2 | North Adelaide vs South Adelaide | 1900, 1902 | South Adelaide | - |
| 2 | Norwood-North vs Port-Torrens | 1943, 1944 | Norwood-North | 1943, 1944 |
| 2 | Norwood-North vs Port-Torrens | 1943, 1944 | Port-Torrens | - |
| 2 | West Adelaide vs North Adelaide | 1927, 1991 | West Adelaide | 1927 |
| 2 | West Adelaide vs North Adelaide | 1927, 1991 | North Adelaide | 1991 |
| 2 | Port Adelaide vs Central District | 1995, 1996 | Port Adelaide | 1995, 1996 |
| 2 | Port Adelaide vs Central District | 1995, 1996 | Central District | - |
| 2 | Central District vs Sturt | 2002, 2009 | Central District | 2009 |
| 2 | Central District vs Sturt | 2002, 2009 | Sturt | 2002 |
| 1 | West Torrens vs Sturt | 1924 | West Torrens | 1924 |
| 1 | West Torrens vs Sturt | 1924 | Sturt | - |
| 1 | South Adelaide vs Sturt | 1940 | South Adelaide | - |
| 1 | South Adelaide vs Sturt | 1940 | Sturt | 1940 |
| 1 | Port-Torrens vs West–Glenelg | 1942 | Port-Torrens | 1942 |
| 1 | Port-Torrens vs West–Glenelg | 1942 | West–Glenelg | - |
| 1 | North Adelaide vs West Torrens | 1949 | North Adelaide | 1949 |
| 1 | North Adelaide vs West Torrens | 1949 | West Torrens | - |
| 1 | Sturt vs West Adelaide | 1983 | Sturt | - |
| 1 | Sturt vs West Adelaide | 1983 | West Adelaide | 1983 |
| 1 | Woodville-West Torrens vs Norwood | 1993 | Woodville-West Torrens | 1993 |
| 1 | Woodville-West Torrens vs Norwood | 1993 | Norwood | - |
| 1 | Woodville-West Torrens vs Port Adelaide | 1994 | Woodville-West Torrens | - |
| 1 | Woodville-West Torrens vs Port Adelaide | 1994 | Port Adelaide | 1994 |
| 1 | Central District vs West Adelaide | 2003 | Central District | 2003 |
| 1 | Central District vs West Adelaide | 2003 | West Adelaide | - |
| 1 | North Adelaide vs Central District | 2007 | North Adelaide | - |
| 1 | North Adelaide vs Central District | 2007 | Central District | 2007 |
| 1 | Glenelg vs Central District | 2008 | Glenelg | - |
| 1 | Glenelg vs Central District | 2008 | Central District | 2008 |
| 1 | Norwood vs Central District | 2010 | Norwood | - |
| 1 | Norwood vs Central District | 2010 | Central District | 2010 |
| 1 | West Adelaide vs Woodville-West Torrens | 2015 | West Adelaide | 2015 |
| 1 | West Adelaide vs Woodville-West Torrens | 2015 | Woodville-West Torrens | - |
| 1 | Sturt vs Woodville-West Torrens | 2016 | Sturt | 2016 |
| 1 | Sturt vs Woodville-West Torrens | 2016 | Woodville-West Torrens | - |
| 1 | Woodville-West Torrens vs North Adelaide | 2020 | Woodville-West Torrens | 2020 |
| 1 | Woodville-West Torrens vs North Adelaide | 2020 | North Adelaide | - |
| 1 | Glenelg vs Woodville-West Torrens | 2021 | Glenelg | - |
| 1 | Glenelg vs Woodville-West Torrens | 2021 | Woodville-West Torrens | 2021 |

== Champions of Australia ==
The Championship of Australia was the name given to an Australian rules football tournament which was contested between football clubs from the Victorian, South Australian, West Australian and Tasmania football leagues. The Championship took place three times in the 19th century and then from 1907 to 1914 with the exception of 1912 and every year from 1968 to 1975.

| Club | Premierships | Runners-up |
|---|---|---|
| Port Adelaide | 4 | 0 |
| Norwood | 2 | 1 |
| West Adelaide | 2 | 1 |
| South Adelaide | 1 | 2 |
| North Adelaide | 1 | 1 |
| Sturt | 0 | 4 |

== SANFL Grand Final Records ==
Prior to 1974 all SANFL Grand Finals were held at the Adelaide Oval (bar the 1904 Grand Final at Jubilee Oval). From 1974 to 2013 they were held at Football Park. From 2014 onwards they returned to Adelaide Oval.

- Largest Attendance at Football Park: 66,897 - Sturt 17.14 (116) d Port Adelaide 10.15 (75), 1976
- Smallest Attendance at Football Park: 22,207 - Central District 23.15 (153) d Woodville-West Torrens 4.4 (28), 2004
- Largest Attendance at Adelaide Oval: 62,543 - Port Adelaide 12.8 (80) d Sturt 12.5 (77), 1965
- Highest Score: 24.15 (159) Sturt d Glenelg 13.16 (94), 1969
- Lowest Score: 1.6 (12) Port Adelaide lost to North Adelaide 6.8 (44), 1905
- Largest Winning Margin: 125 points - Central District 23.15 (153) d Woodville-West Torrens 4.4 (28), 2004
- Smallest Winning Margin: 1 point - Norwood 8.4 (52) d West Torrens 7.9 (51), 1925 & Norwood 16.15 (111) d Sturt 14.26 (110), 1978 & Sturt 7.8 (50) d Port Adelaide 7.7 (49), 2017 & Norwood 8.11 (59) d North Adelaide 8.10 (58), 2022
- Highest Losing Score: 19.16 (130) - North Adelaide lost to Glenelg 21.11 (137), 1973
- Lowest Winning Score: 3.5 (23) - Sturt d North Adelaide 2.6 (18), 1919
- Highest Match Aggregate: 267 points - Glenelg 21.11 (137) d North Adelaide 19.16 (130), 1973
- Lowest Match Aggregate: 41 points - North Adelaide 4.3 (27) d South Adelaide 1.8 (14), 1900 & Sturt 3.5 (23) d North Adelaide 2.6 (18), 1919

== Minor grades ==
=== Reserves ===
Reserve grade premierships are contested between the existing SANFL clubs, with the exception of Adelaide, who have elected not to field a team in the SANFL reserves, and Port Adelaide, who shut down its reserves team in 2018.

From 1877 SAFA teams also had second twenty teams. In some years the Association had an official programme for the second twenties. 1878 - South Adelaide (Premiers), Port Adelaide (2nd) 1879 - South Adelaide (Premiers), South Park and Port Adelaide (Equal Second)

While official SANFL records recognise premierships going back to 1919, the first Association league (that operated underneath the SAFA premiership) commenced in 1906, as can be seen in the list of premiers below.

- 1906: Norwood (1)
- 1907: Portland Imperial (1)
- 1908: Portland Imperial (2)
- 1909: Sturt (1)
- 1910: Norwood (2)
- 1911: Port Adelaide (1)
- 1912: North Adelaide (1)
- 1913: Sturt (2)
- 1914: South Adelaide (1)
- 1915: West Torrens (1)
- 1916–18: None (WW1)
- 1919: West Torrens (2)
- 1920: West Torrens (3)
- 1921: Norwood (3)
- 1922: West Torrens (4)
- 1923: Port Adelaide (2)
- 1924: West Torrens (5)
- 1925: North Adelaide (2)
- 1926: West Torrens (6)
- 1927: West Torrens (7)
- 1928: North Adelaide (3)
- 1929: West Adelaide (1)
- 1930: Norwood (4)
- 1931: West Torrens (8)
- 1932: North Adelaide (4)
- 1933: Port Adelaide (3)
- 1934: North Adelaide (5)
- 1935: West Torrens (9)
- 1936: Port Adelaide (4)
- 1937: Norwood (5)
- 1938: Norwood (6)
- 1939: Norwood (7)
- 1940: West Adelaide (2)
- 1941: West Torrens (10)
- 1942–45: None (WW2)
- 1946: West Torrens (11)
- 1947: Port Adelaide (5)
- 1948: Port Adelaide (6)
- 1949: Sturt (3)
- 1950: West Torrens (12)
- 1951: West Adelaide (3)
- 1952: Port Adelaide (7)
- 1953: West Torrens (13)
- 1954: West Torrens (14)
- 1955: Port Adelaide (8)
- 1956: Port Adelaide (9)
- 1957: Port Adelaide (10)
- 1958: Port Adelaide (11)
- 1959: Port Adelaide (12)
- 1960: Norwood (8)
- 1961: Norwood (9)
- 1962: West Torrens (15)
- 1963: Port Adelaide (13)
- 1964: North Adelaide (6)
- 1965: North Adelaide (7)
- 1966: North Adelaide (8)
- 1967: Glenelg (1)
- 1968: West Torrens (16)
- 1969: Norwood (10)
- 1970: Norwood (11)
- 1971: Central District (1)
- 1972: Norwood (12)
- 1973: Woodville (1)
- 1974: Norwood (13)
- 1975: Norwood (14)
- 1976: Norwood (15)
- 1977: Sturt (4)
- 1978: Norwood (16)
- 1979: South Adelaide (2)
- 1980: Port Adelaide (14)
- 1981: Glenelg (2)
- 1982: Glenelg (3)
- 1983: Port Adelaide (15)
- 1984: West Torrens (17)
- 1985: Norwood (17)
- 1986: Norwood (18)
- 1987: Woodville (2)
- 1988: Port Adelaide (16)
- 1989: Central District (2)
- 1990: West Torrens (18)
- 1991: South Adelaide (3)
- 1992: Woodville-West Torrens (1)
- 1993: Woodville-West Torrens (2)
- 1994: West Adelaide (4)
- 1995: Norwood (19)
- 1996: Port Adelaide (17)
- 1997: Port Adelaide (18)
- 1998: Norwood (20)
- 1999: Sturt (5)
- 2000: Woodville-West Torrens (3)
- 2001: Woodville-West Torrens (4)
- 2002: Central District (3)
- 2003: Central District (4)
- 2004: Woodville-West Torrens (5)
- 2005: North Adelaide (9)
- 2006: North Adelaide (10)
- 2007: Glenelg (4)
- 2008: Sturt (6)
- 2009: Glenelg (5)
- 2010: Port Adelaide (19)
- 2011: Glenelg (6)
- 2012: Central District (5)
- 2013: Woodville-West Torrens (6)
- 2014: Woodville-West Torrens (7)
- 2015: Woodville-West Torrens (8)
- 2016: North Adelaide (11)
- 2017: Sturt (7)
- 2018: North Adelaide (12)
- 2019: Norwood (21)
- 2020: Woodville-West Torrens (9)
- 2021: Glenelg (7)
- 2022: Sturt (8)
- 2023: Glenelg (8)
- 2024: Norwood (22)
- 2025: Glenelg (9)
- 2026: South Adelaide (4)

Source where unlisted

=== Thirds/Under 19s/17s & U18s/16s ===
Thirds-grade competitions for SANFL clubs featuring underage players seeking to enter reserves/senior-level football have been in place since the late 1930s. Under-19 and under-17 premierships were scheduled from 1937/1939 to 2008, after which they were replaced with an under 18 competition (initially known as the Maccas Cup) in 2009 and an under 16 series (initially known as the Maccas Shield) in 2010. Note that Port Adelaide's participation in these competitions ended in 2014.

==== Under 19s premiership (1937–2008) ====
- 1937: North Adelaide (1)
- 1938: West Torrens (1)
- 1939: West Torrens (2)
- 1940: Norwood (1)
- 1941: West Torrens (3)
- 1942: North Adelaide (2)
- 1943: West Adelaide (1)
- 1944: West Adelaide (2)
- 1945: Norwood (2)
- 1946: Port Adelaide (1)
- 1947: Norwood (3)
- 1948: North Adelaide (3)
- 1949: North Adelaide (4)
- 1950: Port Adelaide (2)
- 1951: Sturt (1)
- 1952: Norwood (4)
- 1953: Port Adelaide (3)
- 1954: North Adelaide (5)
- 1955: West Torrens (4)
- 1956: West Torrens (5)
- 1957: West Torrens (6)
- 1958: Sturt (2)
- 1959: Glenelg (1)
- 1960: Norwood (5)
- 1961: North Adelaide (6)
- 1962: Port Adelaide (4)
- 1963: Norwood (6)
- 1964: Sturt (3)
- 1965: Norwood (7)
- 1966: North Adelaide (7)
- 1967: Glenelg (2)
- 1968: West Adelaide (3)
- 1969: Glenelg (3)
- 1970: Central District (1)
- 1971: Norwood (8)
- 1972: Norwood (9)
- 1973: West Torrens (7)
- 1974: Port Adelaide (5)
- 1975: Port Adelaide (6)
- 1976: Port Adelaide (7)
- 1977: Port Adelaide (8)
- 1978: West Adelaide (4)
- 1979: Glenelg (4)
- 1980: Norwood (10)
- 1981: Central District (2)
- 1982: Central District (3)
- 1983: Norwood (11)
- 1984: Sturt (4)
- 1985: Norwood (12)
- 1986: Norwood (13)
- 1987: Sturt (5)
- 1988: Norwood (14)
- 1989: West Torrens (8)
- 1990: Norwood (15)
- 1991: Port Adelaide (9)
- 1992: Glenelg (5)
- 1993: South Adelaide (1)
- 1994: South Adelaide (2)
- 1995: Norwood (16)
- 1996: Woodville-West Torrens (1)
- 1997: Norwood (17)
- 1998: Woodville-West Torrens (2)
- 1999: Port Adelaide (10)
- 2000: Woodville-West Torrens (3)
- 2001: Port Adelaide (11)
- 2002: West Adelaide (5)
- 2003: Central District (4)
- 2004: West Adelaide (6)
- 2005: North Adelaide (8)
- 2006: Port Adelaide (12)
- 2007: Port Adelaide (13)
- 2008: Glenelg (6)

Source where unlisted:

==== Under 17s premiership (1939–2008) ====
- 1939: North Adelaide (1)
- 1940: North Adelaide (2)
- 1941: Sturt (1)
- 1942-46: None (WW2)
- 1947: North Adelaide (3)
- 1948: West Adelaide (1)
- 1949: Sturt (2)
- 1950: North Adelaide (4)
- 1951: Port Adelaide (1)
- 1952: North Adelaide (5)
- 1953: West Torrens (1)
- 1954: West Torrens (2)
- 1955: Port Adelaide (2)
- 1956: North Adelaide (6)
- 1957: West Torrens (3)
- 1958: Glenelg (1)
- 1959: Glenelg (2)
- 1960: Glenelg (3)
- 1961: Port Adelaide (3)
- 1962: Woodville (1)
- 1963: Sturt (3)
- 1964: Woodville (2)
- 1965: Norwood (1)
- 1966: Central District (1)
- 1967: Woodville (2)
- 1968: Woodville (3)
- 1969: North Adelaide (7)
- 1970: North Adelaide (8)
- 1971: Port Adelaide (4)
- 1972: Port Adelaide (5)
- 1973: Woodville (4)
- 1974: Sturt (4)
- 1975: Glenelg (4)
- 1976: Sturt (5)
- 1977: Central District (2)
- 1978: Central District (3)
- 1979: Central District (4)
- 1980: Sturt (6)
- 1981: Norwood (2)
- 1982: Norwood (3)
- 1983: Norwood (4)
- 1984: Norwood (5)
- 1985: Central District (5)
- 1986: Norwood (6)
- 1987: North Adelaide (9)
- 1988: Norwood (7)
- 1989: Norwood (8)
- 1990: South Adelaide (1)
- 1991: Norwood (9)
- 1992: Central District (6)
- 1993: Woodville-West Torrens (1)
- 1994: Port Adelaide (6)
- 1995: South Adelaide (2)
- 1996: Central District (7)
- 1997: North Adelaide (10)
- 1998: Woodville-West Torrens (2)
- 1999: Woodville-West Torrens (3)
- 2000: Woodville-West Torrens (4)
- 2001: West Adelaide (2)
- 2002: West Adelaide (3)
- 2003: Sturt (7)
- 2004: Central District (8)
- 2005: North Adelaide (11)
- 2006: West Adelaide (4)
- 2007: North Adelaide (12)
- 2008: Sturt (8)

Source where unlisted:

==== Under 18s premiership (2009–present) ====
- 2009: Glenelg (1)
- 2010: Glenelg (2)
- 2011: Port Adelaide (1)
- 2012: Woodville-West Torrens (1)
- 2013: Woodville-West Torrens (2)
- 2014: West Adelaide (1)
- 2015: Norwood (1)
- 2016: Glenelg (3)
- 2017: Sturt (1)
- 2018: Woodville-West Torrens (3)
- 2019: Woodville-West Torrens (4)
- 2020: Norwood (2)
- 2021: Woodville-West Torrens (5)
- 2022: Glenelg (4)
- 2023: South Adelaide (1)
- 2024: Woodville-West Torrens (6)
- 2025: Sturt (2)
- 2026: Glenelg (5)

==== Under 16s premiership (2010–present) ====
- 2010: North Adelaide (1)
- 2011: North Adelaide (2)
- 2012: Norwood (1)
- 2013: North Adelaide (3)
- 2014: Glenelg (1)
- 2015: Sturt (1)
- 2016: Glenelg (2)
- 2017: Glenelg (3)
- 2018: Glenelg (4)
- 2019: Glenelg (5)
- 2020: Cancelled due to COVID-19 pandemic
- 2021: South Adelaide (1)
- 2022: Woodville West Torrens (1)
- 2023: Central District (1)
- 2024: Sturt (2)
- 2025: West Adelaide (1)
- 2026: Glenelg (6)

== See also ==
- List of SANFL minor premiers
- List of SANFL Women's League premiers
