= 1921 SAFL Grand Final =

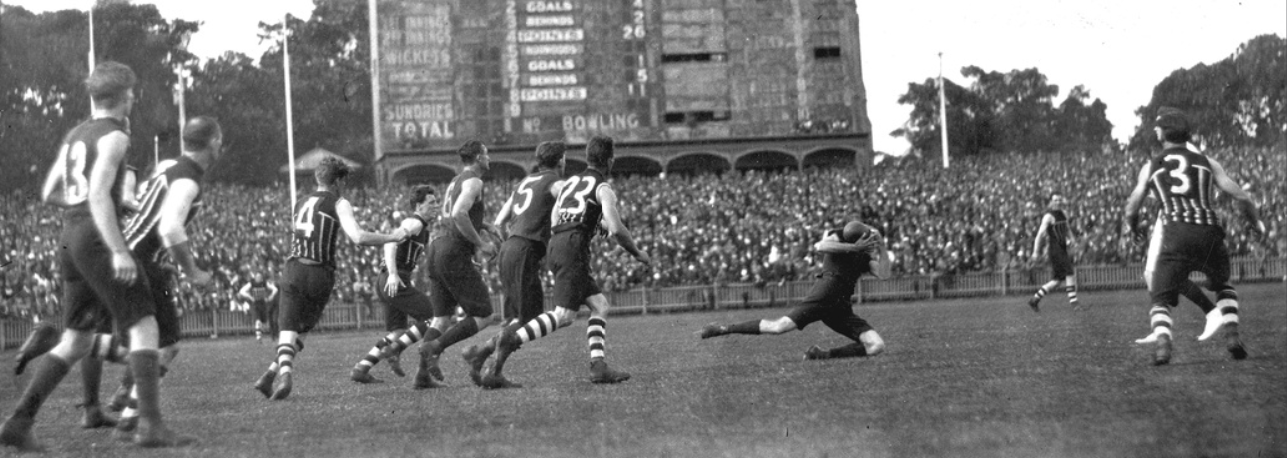

Norwood	Port Adelaide
3.6 (24)	4.8 (32)
	1	2	3	4
NOR	0.4 (4)	1.5 (11)	2.6 (18)	3.6 (24)
PTA	3.1 (19)	4.3 (27)	4.6 (30)	4.8 (32)
- Date: Saturday, 8 October (2:10 pm)
- Stadium: Adelaide Oval
- Attendance: 34,800
- Umpires: Mr Haven
- Coin toss won by: Port Adelaide
- Kicked toward: Scoreboard End

Accolades
- Best on Ground: Peter Bampton

The 1921 SAFL Grand Final was an Australian rules football game contested between the Norwood Football Club and the Port Adelaide Football Club, held at the Adelaide Oval in Adelaide on 8 October 1921. It was the 23rd annual Grand Final of the South Australian Football League, staged to determine the premiers for the 1921 SAFL season. The match, attended by 34,000 spectators, was won by Port Adelaide by a margin of 8 points, marking the club's ninth premiership victory.

== Teams ==
Port Adelaide's team was not finalised until just before the game with Taylor, Lloyd and Mayne left out of the squad of 21 and Eric Dewar replacing Maurice Allingham.

Port Adelaide
B:	Kenneth Slade	John Ford	Charlie Adams
HB:	Clarence Maywald	Peter Bampton	Bert Olds
C:	Sampson Hosking	Gordon Beck	Ernest Mucklow
HF:	Clem Dayman	14. Harold Oliver (c)	Clifford Keal
F:	Les Dayman	Eric Dewar	Lindsay Beck
Foll:	John Taylor	Sam Howie	10. Angelo Congear
Coach:	Sampson Hosking		

Norwood
B:	Basil Scott	Roy Bent	Clarence Packham
HB:	Charles Gwynne	Clyde Close	Spencer Sibley
C:	William Heinrich	Roy Townley	Claude Toovey
HF:	Guy Stephens	7. Walter Scott	Syd White (c)
F:	Murray Dobson	Harry Johns	Harold Grantley
Foll:	6. Leslie Bryant	William Potts	Bert Shumacher
Coach:	William Hutton		

== Scorecard ==
1921 SAFL Grand Final
Saturday, 8 October	Port Adelaide	def.	Norwood	Adelaide Oval (crowd: 34,000)
3.1 (19); 4.3 (27); 4.6 (30); 4.8 (32)	Q1; Q2; Q3; Final	0.4 (4); 1.5 (11); 2.6 (18); 3.6 (24)	Best on Ground: Bampton
Keal 2 Dewar, Congear 1	Goals	3 Bent
Bampton, Oliver, Beck, Congear, Dayman, Keal, Hosking, Adams, Slade	Best	Dobson, Johns, Bryant, White, Toovey, Stephens, Schumacher, Scott, Grantley
