= Les Bryant =

Australian rules footballer

Personal information
- Full name: Leslie Allan Bryant
- Born: 29 June 1896; Norwood, South Australia
- Died: 24 April 1965 (aged 68); Repatriation General Hospital, Heidelberg, Victoria
- Original team: Norwood
- Height: 182 cm (6 ft 0 in)
- Weight: 91 kg (201 lb)

Playing career^{1}
Years	Club	Games (Goals)
1919	West Adelaide	7 (5)
1920–1922	Norwood	47 (10)
1923–1924	Fitzroy	35 (23)

Representative team honours
Years	Team	Games (Goals)
1920-1922	South Australia	6 (0)
1923	Victoria	2 (1)
- ^{1} Playing statistics correct to the end of 1924.

Leslie Allan Bryant MM (29 June 1896 – 24 April 1965) was an Australian rules footballer who played with both West Adelaide and Norwood in the South Australian Football League (SAFL), with Fitzroy in the Victorian Football League (VFL), and with Dimboola in the Wimmera District Football League (WDFL).

== Family ==
The son of Charles Horace Bryant (-1922), and Margaret Melrose Bryant (-1944), née Gilchrist, Leslie Allan Bryant was born at Norwood, South Australia on 29 June 1896. He married Jane Smith (1899-1995) in 1922. They had one child.

== Military service ==
Having enlisted in the First A.I.F., aged 18, on 2 February 1915, he served overseas in France as an ambulance driver in the 3rd Australian Field Ambulance. He was awarded the Military Medal for his "gallantry and devotion to duty during the attack near Villeret on 18th September, 1918". He returned to Australia on the HT Karagola, landing in Adelaide on 9 June 1919.

== Football ==
- Photographs/Caricatures
- South Australia's Football Team (photograph), The Critic, (Wednesday, 10 August 1921), p. 27: Bryant is second from left, back row.
- New Arrival at Fitzroy (photograph), The Sporting Globe, (Saturday, 31 March 1923), p. 6.
- L. Bryant (photograph), The (Adelaide) Journal, (Friday, 27 April 1923), p. 4.
- (Two photographs of Bryant (No.23) taken at the 2 June 1923 match against Essendon), The (Melbourne) Sun News-Pictorial, (Monday, 4 June 1923), p. 1.
- "Bryant (Fitzroy)" (Wells' caricature), The (Melbourne) Herald, (Friday, 17 August 1923), p. 3.
- (Photograph of Bryant (No.23) taken at the 27 September 1924 match against South Melbourne), The (Melbourne) Sun News-Pictorial, (Monday, 29 September 1924), p. 24.
- "For Dimboola" (photograph), The Weekly Times, (Saturday, 18 April 1925), p. 70.

=== West Adelaide (SAFL) ===
A follower, Bryant joined West Adelaide immediately after his return from overseas service, and made his debut against Sturt Football Club on 14 June 1919.

=== Norwood (SAFL) ===
Bryant joined Norwood in 1920; and, alongside "Wacka" Scott, Bryant was a critical factor in the team's improvement from one win in the 1919 SAFL season to a Grand Final in 1921.

In 1921, he was best afield in both the semi-final replay and the preliminary final, and was one of the best afield in the Norwood team that lost the 1921 SAFL Grand Final to Port Adelaide 3.6 (24) to 4.8 (32). On 22 October, at the Norwood Oval, playing in the first ruck, he was one of Norwood's best players in the match between Norwood (the 1921 SAFL premiership runner-up) and Carlton (the 1921 VFL premiership runner-up): Norwood defeated Carlton 12.9 (81) to 10.14 (74).

In 1922, he was the team's vice-captain. He played as first ruck in the Norwood team that won the 1922 SAFL premiership. On 26 August 1922, at the Adelaide Oval, playing in the first ruck, he was one of the best players in the match between (significantly-weakened) Norwood (the 1922 SAFL premiership team) and East Perth (the 1922 WAFL premiership team): East Perth defeated Norwood 8.20 (68) to 7.10 (52).

==== SAFL Representative teams ====
On 29 May 1920, at the Melbourne Cricket Ground, Bryant played at centre half-forward in the SAFL team that defeated the VFL team 10.11 (71) to 9.12 (66). On 24 July 1920, at the Adelaide Oval, Bryant played at centre half-forward in the SAFL team that lost, in the return match, to the VFL team 3.6 (24) to 10.14 (74).

On 6 August 1921, whilst the SAFL team was playing the VFL in Perth, as part of the 1921 ANFC Perth Carnival, Bryant was in a second representative SAFL team that played against a second representative VFL team, at the Adelaide Oval. Playing in the first ruck, Bryant was one of the best players in the side that lost to the VFL 5.19 (49) to 10.12 (72). On 13 August 1921, playing in the first ruck, Bryant was the best player in the SAFL team that lost to the VFL 10.13 (73) to 15.8 (96).

On 8 July 1922, at the Melbourne Cricket Ground, playing in the first ruck, Bryant was on of the SAFL's best players in the teams loss to the VFL 5.15 (45) to 9.10 (64). On 12 August 1922, at the Adelaide Oval, playing in the first ruck, Bryant was part of the SAFL team that defeated the VFL in the return match, 7.14 (56) to 6.14 (50).

=== Fitzroy (VFL) ===
Cleared from Norwood to Fitzroy on 18 April 1923, he made his VFL debut (aged 26), at centre half-forward and second ruck, against Essendon, at Windy Hill, on 2 June 1923. He scored two goals, the first of which was with a place-kick. At Fitzroy, he played a total of 35 senior games: 16 in 1923, and 19 in 1924. Bryant appeared in six finals for Fitzroy, including Fitzroy's 1923 VFL Grand Final (unexpected) 6.10 (46) to 8.15 (63) loss to Essendon, when he played as the forward pocket resting ruckman, and was one of Fitzroy's best players.

==== VFL Representative teams ====
Playing at centre half-forward and the second ruck Bryant was one of the best players in the VFL representative team that defeated a combined Ballarat Football League team, 11.8 (74) to 8.12 (60), at the Eastern Oval, Ballarat on 30 June 1923. He also represented the VFL, in the return interstate match against South Australia, at the (muddy) Melbourne Cricket Ground on Saturday, 18 August 1923, which the VFL team won 9.15 (69) to 4.5 (29). Playing in the first ruck, Bryant was one of the team's best players

==== VFL Tribunal ====
Following a torrid match against Essendon, at Windy Hill, on 2 August 1924, Bryant was reported for elbowing Essendon's Greg Stockdale in the first quarter of the match. After a brief hearing on 6 September 1924 the Tribunal dismissed the charge against Bryant.

=== Dimboola (WDFL) ===
In 1925, a (mistaken) press report stated that Bryant was cleared by Fitzroy to the Benalla Football Club in the Ovens & Murray Football League; however, the player involved was Bob Merrick. Bryant, who had suffered a serious eye injury during the match against South Melbourne on 27 September 1924, and reluctant to continue playing in the VFL, was cleared by Fitzroy to play, alongside the former Port Adelaide and later St Kilda footballer Harry Kuhl, under the former Geelong champion Bert Rankin (captain/coach) at the Dimboola Football Club in the Wimmera District Football League (WDFL).

=== Fitzroy (VFL) ===
Although he had been cleared from Dimboola back to Fitzroy in April 1926, and had commenced early pre-season training with the team, his on-going problems with his eye injury were such that he decided to abandon training and retired from all football before the start of the 1926 VFL season.

== Athletics ==
An accomplished professional sprinter, he competed at several Stawell Gift meetings.

== Death ==
He died at the Repatriation General Hospital, Heidelberg on 24 April 1965.

== See also ==
- 1920 SAFL Grand Final
- 1922 SAFL Grand Final
- 1923 VFL grand final
