= Lindsay Beck =

Australian rules footballer (1900–1982)

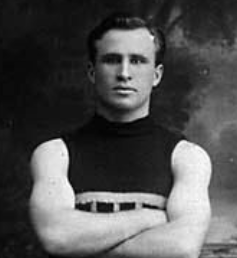

Personal information
- Full name: Lindsay George Beck
- Born: 4 April 1900; Broken Hill, New South Wales, Australia
- Died: 5 February 1982 (aged 81); Broken Hill, New South Wales, Australia
- Original team: South Broken Hill
- Height: 168 cm (5 ft 6 in)
- Weight: 68 kg (150 lb)
- Position: Rover

Playing career^{1}
Years	Club	Games (Goals)
1921–1922	Port Adelaide	29 (26)
1924	Glenelg	9 (6)
1926	Hawthorn	2 (0)
Total		40 (32)
- ^{1} Playing statistics correct to the end of 1926.

Career highlights
- SANFL premiership player: 1921

Lindsay George Beck (4 April 1900 – 5 February 1982) was an Australian rules footballer who played with Port Adelaide and Glenelg in the South Australian National Football League (SANFL) and Hawthorn in the Victorian Football League (VFL).

== Early life ==
The eighth of nine children born to Oliver George Beck (1865–1938) and Elizabeth Beck, nee Ward (1866–1936), Lindsay George Beck was born in Broken Hill on 4 April 1900.

== Football ==
After commencing his career with South Broken Hill Football Club, Beck moved to Adelaide and (along with his brother Gordon) played with Port Adelaide in 1921–1922, including being part of Port's 1921 premiership team. Beck then returned to Broken Hill for the 1923 season and before playing for Glenelg in 1924. He again returned to South Broken Hill for the 1925 season.

Beck and his South Broken Hill team-mate Tom Everuss both joined Hawthorn at the start of the 1926 VFL season. He made his debut against North Melbourne in Round 2 and played the next game and was then dropped. Beck then returned to South Broken Hill.

== Later life ==
In 1928 Lindsay George Beck married Elizabeth Jane Cashman (1904-1993) and they lived in South Broken Hill until his death in 1982.

== Honours and achievements ==
Team

- SANFL premiership player (Port Adelaide): 1921
