= Mike Patterson (footballer) =

Australian rules footballer and coach

Personal information
- Full name: Michael Forster Patterson
- Born: 7 January 1941
- Died: 16 April 2002 (aged 61)
- Original team: Mirboo North
- Height: 193 cm (6 ft 4 in)
- Weight: 96 kg (212 lb)

Playing career^{1}
Years	Club	Games (Goals)
1959–1969	Richmond	152 (73)
1970–1973	North Adelaide	52 (49)
Total		204 (122)

Coaching career
Years	Club	Games (W–L–D)
1970–1977	North Adelaide	176 (97–78–1)
1978–1980	St Kilda	46 (14–31–1)
1981–1983	Frankston (VFA)	55 (25–29–1)
1984	Richmond	22 (10–12–0)
Total		299 (146–150–3)
- ^{1} Playing statistics correct to the end of 1984.

Career highlights
- VFL premiership player: 1967; 2× Richmond reserves best and fairest: 1966, 1969; 2× SANFL premiership coach: 1971, 1972; Australian Championship coach: 1972; Interstate Games: 1

Michael Forster Patterson (7 January 1941 – 16 April 2002) was an Australian rules footballer and coach. Affectionately known as the "Swamp Fox", Patterson was a premiership ruckman with the Richmond Football Club in 1967, and also captain/coach of the 1972 Australian Champions, the North Adelaide Football Club.

== Richmond ==
Patterson played for the Richmond Football Club between 1959 and 1969. When first choice ruck Neville Crowe was suspended for the 1967 grand final, Patterson stepped up brilliantly to compete with legendary ruckman Polly Farmer and made a major contribution to Richmond's 9-point victory.

In Round 8 of the 1969 VFL season, Patterson was hit in the face with a football by Carlton trainer Ron Vincent. The event was immortalised in Mike Brady's football anthem "Up There Cazaly".

== North Adelaide ==
In 1970, Patterson joined the North Adelaide Football Club as captain/coach with great success, hardening a champion side and leading the Roosters to SANFL premierships in 1971 and 1972. In 1972, he also led North Adelaide to national triumph in the Australian Championship, sealed with a 1-point victory over the Carlton Football Club.

In 1973, he retired as a player after a career of 18 years but remained as North Adelaide's coach until 1977. However, the Roosters' fortunes would decline severely after 1973: in Patterson's four seasons as non-playing coach they won just 30 and drew one of 84 matches and did not finish higher than fifth.

== St Kilda ==
Patterson returned to the VFL as coach of St Kilda from 1978 until Round 2 of 1980. After an extremely uneven 1978 season that nonetheless saw the Saints improve from three wins and two draws to eleven wins and a draw, in 1979 St Kilda collected the wooden spoon for the second time in three years. Former player and trucking millionaire Lindsay Fox had been brought into the club, as president, in 1979. One of his actions was to facilitate the signing of high-profile Alex Jesaulenko as an on-field player only. However this placed great pressure on Patterson's position as Jesaulenko had an established record as a captain/coach, having the year previously led Carlton to premiership victory.

During the Round 2 match two St Kilda players, in an attempt to win the ball, comically bumped into each other. Fox declared this indicated a lack of discipline that could no longer be tolerated. Patterson was sacked immediately for Jesaulenko.

== Frankston ==
Patterson went on to coach Frankston in the VFA from 1981 to 1983. The Dolphins would finish fourth in his first season, but win only five of eighteen games for third-last in First Division in 1982, before rebounding in 1983 to finish sixth of twelve, one-and-a-half wins out of the top four but with a very poor percentage.

== Richmond ==
Patterson returned home to Punt Road Oval in his final position – as senior coach at Richmond for the 1984 season. When appointed to succeed Francis Bourke, who quit at the end of August after a season with only seven wins from 22 games for the Tigers' worst record since the great revival of 1965, Patterson was the board's fourth choice, but the higher preferences in Kevin Sheedy, Neil Balme and Mal Brown were all unavailable. Although the club rose from tenth to eighth with three more victories, this was not satisfactory for a Richmond hierarchy expecting success, and Patterson would resign in November after a board rebellion.

== Death ==
Patterson died from a stroke on 16 April 2002, at the age of 61.

== Honours ==
In 2001, shortly before his death, Mike Patterson, the first Victorian to steer an SANFL club to a premiership, was selected as coach of North Adelaide's official 'Team of the Twentieth Century'.

== Bibliography ==
- Hogan, P. (1996). The Tigers Of Old. Melbourne: Richmond Football Club.
