= Harry Boyd =

Personal information
- Born: 11 February 1998 (age 28)
- Original team: Shepparton/Murray Bushrangers/Werribee/Norwood
- Draft: 2025 pre-season supplemental selection period
- Debut: Round 1, 2025, St Kilda vs. Adelaide, at Adelaide Oval
- Height: 198 cm (6 ft 6 in)
- Position: Ruckman

Playing career
Years	Club	Games (Goals)
2025	St Kilda	1 (0)

Career highlights
- 2x SANFL premiership player: 2022, 2026; Jack Oatey Medal: 2022; Magarey Medal: 2024

Harry Boyd (born 11 February 1998) is a former professional Australian rules footballer who played for the St Kilda Football Club in the Australian Football League (AFL).

== Pre-AFL career ==
Boyd played for the Murray Bushrangers in the Talent League as a junior. He was not drafted to the AFL initially, instead playing for the Shepparton Football Club as well as some games for Werribee in the VFL.

Boyd was signed by Norwood in 2021. In 2022, Boyd won the Jack Oatey Medal for being best on ground in the 2022 SANFL Grand Final with a 20 disposal, 64 hitout game. In 2024, Boyd received the Magarey Medal as the best and fairest player of the SANFL, averaging 41.8 hitouts, 20.1 disposals and 10 clearances per game.

== AFL career ==
Boyd was selected by St Kilda during the 2025 pre-season supplemental selection period. He made his debut against the Adelaide Crows in round 1 of the 2025 AFL season. That was his only match at AFL level, and he was delisted by St Kilda following the conclusion of the season. He returned to Norwood after his delisting.

== Statistics ==
Legend
G	Goals	K	Kicks	D	Disposals	T	Tackles
B	Behinds	H	Handballs	M	Marks	H/O	Hit-outs

Season	Team	No.	Games	Totals								Averages (per game)								Votes
Season	Team	No.	Games	G	B	K	H	D	M	T	H/O	G	B	K	H	D	M	T	H/O	Votes
2025	St Kilda	31	1	0	0	4	8	12	1	2	27	0.0	0.0	4.0	8.0	12.0	1.0	2.0	27.0	0
Career			1	0	0	4	8	12	1	2	27	0.0	0.0	4.0	8.0	12.0	1.0	2.0	27.0	0
