= 1921 SAFL season =

1921 SAFL premiership season
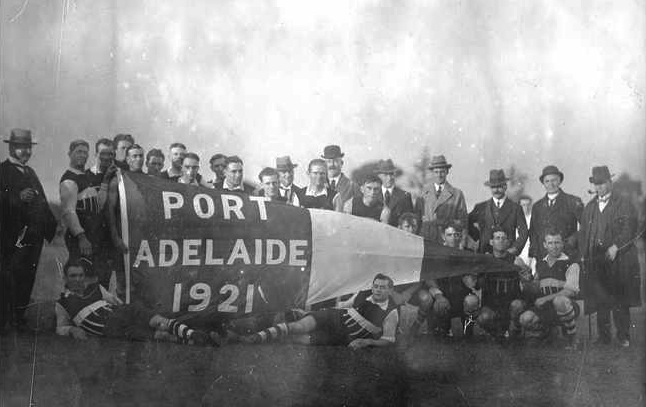
- 41st SAFL season
- Teams: 8
- Premiers: Port Adelaide; 9th premiership
- Minor premiers: Port Adelaide; 13th minor premiership
- Magarey Medallist: Dan Moriarty; South Adelaide (5 votes); John Karney (Note: Awarded retrospectively and posthumously); West Torrens (5 votes); Charlie Adams; Port Adelaide (5 votes) "Wacka" Scott; Norwood (5 votes)
- Leading goalkicker: Roy Bent; Norwood (42 goals)
- Matches played: 61
- Highest: 34,000 (Grand Final, Port Adelaide vs Norwood)

The 1921 South Australian Football League season was the 42nd season of the top-level Australian rules football competition in South Australia. The competition expanded from seven to eight teams with Glenelg being admitted to the seniors after one year in the B Grade. (Note: Now known as the "Reserves" and also known in its early days as the "Association".) Glenelg would finish winless not merely in this but also in all their next three seasons, creating an unwanted record for major Australian rules leagues of fifty-six consecutive losses.

The season opened on 7 May with the opening fixtures between West Adelaide and Glenelg and between West Torrens and South Adelaide. It concluded on 8 October with the Grand Final, in which minor premiers Port Adelaide went on to record its ninth premiership, defeating Norwood by 8 points, while South Adelaide, with Dan Moriarty achieving an unprecedented hat-trick of Magarey Medals, would achieve their best team performance during his short career and their only finals victory between 1904 and 1934.

== Minor Round ==
=== Round 1 ===
	Round 1
Saturday, 7 May 1921	West Adelaide 18.10 (118)	def.	Glenelg 6.5 (41)	Adelaide Oval
Saturday, 7 May 1921	West Torrens 11.11 (77)	def. by	South Adelaide 11.22 (88)	Hindmarsh Oval
Monday, 9 May 1921	North Adelaide 7.9 (51)	def. by	Sturt 8.6 (54)	Adelaide Oval
Monday, 9 May 1921	Norwood 9.7 (61)	def.	Port Adelaide 5.11 (41)	Norwood Oval

=== Round 2 ===
	Round 2
Saturday, 14 May 1921	West Adelaide 4.1 (25)	def. by	Sturt 6.13 (49)	Adelaide Oval
Saturday, 14 May 1921	Port Adelaide 19.21 (135)	def.	Glenelg 3.10 (28)	Alberton Oval
Saturday, 14 May 1921	West Torrens 18.12 (120)	def.	Norwood 11.11 (77)	Hindmarsh Oval
Saturday, 14 May 1921	North Adelaide 10.9 (69)	def.	South Adelaide 8.10 (58)	Jubilee Oval
Port's score is the highest in the league since the Magpies kicked a record 29.12 (186) against West Adelaide in Round 14, 1903, (Note: Port's record would be beaten by West Adelaide's 29.17 (191) against Glenelg in Round 17, 1928.) and the first win by over 100 points since Norwood best West by 119 points in Round 14, 1904.

=== Round 3 ===
	Round 3
Saturday, 21 May 1921	South Adelaide 10.6 (66)	def. by	Port Adelaide 10.11 (71)	Adelaide Oval
Saturday, 21 May 1921	Glenelg 8.12 (60)	def. by	North Adelaide 13.14 (92)	Glenelg Oval (crowd: 4,000)
Saturday, 21 May 1921	Norwood 9.11 (65)	def.	West Adelaide 8.13 (61)	Norwood Oval
Saturday, 21 May 1921	Sturt 13.8 (86)	def.	West Torrens 8.11 (59)	Unley Oval

=== Round 4 ===
	Round 4
Saturday, 28 May 1921	South Adelaide 8.8 (56)	def. by	Sturt 10.11 (71)	Adelaide Oval
Saturday, 28 May 1921	Port Adelaide 17.17 (119)	def.	West Adelaide 3.2 (20)	Alberton Oval
Saturday, 28 May 1921	Glenelg 10.5 (65)	def. by	Norwood 15.12 (102)	Glenelg Oval
Saturday, 28 May 1921	West Torrens 11.12 (78)	def.	North Adelaide 5.10 (40)	Hindmarsh Oval

=== Round 5 ===
	Round 5
Saturday, 4 June 1921	South Adelaide 13.19 (97)	def.	West Adelaide 13.7 (85)	Adelaide Oval
Saturday, 4 June 1921	Sturt 8.8 (56)	def. by	Norwood 12.13 (85)	Unley Oval
Monday, 6 June 1921	North Adelaide 7.4 (46)	def.	Port Adelaide 3.11 (29)	Adelaide Oval
Monday, 6 June 1921	Glenelg 5.6 (36)	def. by	West Torrens 6.14 (50)	Glenelg Oval

=== Round 6 ===
	Round 6
Saturday, 11 June 1921	West Adelaide 7.11 (53)	def. by	West Torrens 7.14 (56)	Adelaide Oval
Saturday, 11 June 1921	Glenelg 5.5 (35)	def. by	South Adelaide 9.17 (71)	Glenelg Oval
Saturday, 11 June 1921	Norwood 8.15 (63)	def.	North Adelaide 4.8 (32)	Norwood Oval
Saturday, 11 June 1921	Sturt 8.8 (56)	def. by	Port Adelaide 7.15 (57)	Unley Oval

=== Round 7 ===
	Round 7
Saturday, 18 June 1921	South Adelaide 11.12 (78)	def.	Norwood 7.6 (48)	Adelaide Oval
Saturday, 18 June 1921	Port Adelaide 11.19 (85)	def.	West Torrens 6.11 (47)	Alberton Oval
Saturday, 18 June 1921	West Adelaide 11.4 (70)	drew with	North Adelaide 9.16 (70)	Jubilee Oval
Saturday, 18 June 1921	Sturt 16.12 (108)	def.	Glenelg 6.10 (46)	Unley Oval

=== Round 8 ===
	Round 8
Saturday, 25 June 1921	West Adelaide 10.9 (69)	def.	Norwood 5.9 (39)	Adelaide Oval
Saturday, 25 June 1921	West Torrens 10.11 (71)	def.	Sturt 6.13 (49)	Hindmarsh Oval
Monday, 27 June 1921	South Adelaide 9.14 (68)	def. by	North Adelaide 13.8 (86)	Adelaide Oval
Monday, 27 June 1921	Glenelg 6.1 (37)	def. by	Port Adelaide 23.20 (158)	Glenelg Oval (crowd: 6,000)
Port kick the first score of 20 goals in the SAFA/SAFL since the Magpies kicked 29.12 (186) against West Adelaide in Round 14, 1903.

=== Round 9 ===
	Round 9
Saturday, 2 July 1921	South Adelaide 15.16 (106)	def.	Glenelg 4.7 (31)	Adelaide Oval
Saturday, 2 July 1921	Port Adelaide 12.14 (86)	def.	Norwood 5.16 (46)	Alberton Oval
Saturday, 2 July 1921	West Torrens 5.19 (49)	def.	West Adelaide 6.10 (46)	Hindmarsh Oval
	Bye; North Adelaide, Sturt

=== Round 10 ===
	Round 10
Saturday, 9 July 1921	North Adelaide 9.12 (66)	def.	West Adelaide 3.9 (27)	Adelaide Oval
Saturday, 9 July 1921	Glenelg 8.3 (51)	def. by	Sturt 12.10 (82)	Glenelg Oval
Saturday, 9 July 1921	Norwood 11.11 (77)	def.	West Torrens 10.12 (72)	Norwood Oval
	Bye; Port Adelaide, South Adelaide

=== Round 11 ===
	Round 11
Saturday, 16 July 1921	Port Adelaide 11.12 (78)	def.	North Adelaide 9.6 (60)	Alberton Oval
Saturday, 16 July 1921	West Torrens 20.15 (135)	def.	Glenelg 9.7 (61)	Hindmarsh Oval
Saturday, 16 July 1921	West Adelaide 11.4 (70)	def. by	South Adelaide 15.8 (98)	Jubilee Oval
Saturday, 16 July 1921	Norwood 10.18 (78)	def.	Sturt 10.10 (70)	Norwood Oval
The West versus South game would become the final League game played at Jubilee Oval, where the overhead fee of £41 was considered too high by the League. The Bloods would never obtain a permanent home ground until they obtained the Wayville Showgrounds in 1927.

=== Round 12 ===
	Round 12
Saturday, 23 July 1921	West Adelaide 7.12 (54)	def. by	Port Adelaide 16.10 (106)	Adelaide Oval
Saturday, 23 July 1921	Norwood 4.14 (38)	def. by	South Adelaide 9.9 (63)	Norwood Oval
Saturday, 23 July 1921	Sturt 11.20 (86)	def.	North Adelaide 6.14 (50)	Unley Oval
	Bye; Glenelg, West Torrens

=== Round 13 ===
	Round 13
Saturday, 30 July 1921	South Adelaide 12.8 (80)	def.	West Torrens 3.11 (29)	Adelaide Oval
Saturday, 30 July 1921	Port Adelaide 15.13 (103)	def.	Sturt 6.11 (47)	Alberton Oval
Saturday, 30 July 1921	Glenelg 3.9 (27)	def. by	West Adelaide 5.8 (38)	Glenelg Oval
	Bye; North Adelaide, Norwood

=== Round 14 ===
	Round 14
Saturday, 20 August 1921	North Adelaide 9.10 (64)	def.	West Torrens 9.7 (61)	Adelaide Oval
Saturday, 20 August 1921	Norwood 20.17 (137)	def.	Glenelg 5.7 (37)	Norwood Oval
Saturday, 20 August 1921	Sturt 8.10 (58)	def. by	South Adelaide 7.19 (61)	Unley Oval
	Bye; Port Adelaide, West Adelaide

=== Round 15 ===
	Round 15
Saturday, 27 August 1921	North Adelaide 10.15 (75)	def.	Glenelg 7.6 (48)	Adelaide Oval
Saturday, 27 August 1921	West Torrens 11.7 (73)	def. by	Port Adelaide 11.12 (78)	Hindmarsh Oval
Saturday, 27 August 1921	Sturt 7.12 (54)	def.	West Adelaide 6.9 (45)	Unley Oval
	Bye; Norwood, South Adelaide
Port's narrow win over Torrens would become the final League game at Hindmarsh Oval, as Torrens was already preparing to open Thebarton Oval for the following season.

=== Round 16 ===
	Round 16
Saturday, 3 September 1921	Norwood 8.12 (60)	def.	North Adelaide 7.6 (48)	Adelaide Oval
Saturday, 3 September 1921	Port Adelaide 16.15 (111)	def.	South Adelaide 7.8 (50)	Alberton Oval
	Bye; Glenelg, Sturt, West Adelaide, West Torrens

== Ladder ==
1921 SAFL Ladder
Pos	Team	Pld	W	L	D	PF	PA	PP	Pts
1	Port Adelaide (P)	14	12	2	0	1257	691	64.53	24
2	South Adelaide	14	9	5	0	1040	879	54.19	18
3	Norwood	14	9	5	0	976	898	52.08	18
4	Sturt	14	8	6	0	926	838	52.49	16
5	North Adelaide	14	7	6	1	849	840	50.27	15
6	West Torrens	14	7	7	0	977	920	51.50	14
7	West Adelaide	14	3	10	1	781	936	45.49	7
8	Glenelg	14	0	14	0	603	1407	30.00	0

Rules for classification: 1) points; 2) percentage; 3) number of points for.
(P) Premiers

== Major Round ==
=== First Semi-Final ===
1921 SAFL First Semi-Final
Saturday, 10 September 1921	Port Adelaide	drew with	Norwood	Adelaide Oval (crowd: 30,000)
1.0 (6); 4.3 (27); 7.5 (47); 10.6 (66)	Q1; Q2; Q3; Final	2.2 (14); 5.3 (33); 9.5 (59); 10.6 (66)	Umpires: Raven
L. C. Dayman 3, Congear 2, Olds 2, Keal, P. Taylor, Slade	Goals	Close 3, Sibley 3, Bent 3, Schumacher
Congear, Howie, Hosking, Olds, L. G. Beck, Mucklow, Adams, Bampton, P. Taylor	Best	W. Scott, Bryant, White, Townley, Schumacher, B. A. Scott, Johns, Stephens, Potts

=== Second Semi-Final ===
1921 SAFL Second Semi-Final
Saturday, 17 September 1921	South Adelaide	def.	Sturt	Adelaide Oval (crowd: 19,406)
4.2 (26); 8.4 (52); 12.4 (76); 13.5 (83) (Note: South Adelaide's final score was originally listed as 12.5 (77) but all modern sources have it as 13.5 (83). This is why the thirteenth goalkicker is not shown.)	Q1; Q2; Q3; Final	3.5 (23); 4.10 (34); 6.11 (47); 7.13 (55)	Umpires: Raven
J. W. Daly 3, McKee 3, J. Tredrea 2, Kay 2, Canst, Way,	Goals	Golding 2, Nicolle, Baker, Odgers, O. B. Beatty, Barron
Caust, D. Moriarty, McKee, Easton, Waye, C. Tredrea, Williams, Kay, J. Tredrea	Best	Mayman, Barron, Golding, E. Beatty, Odgers, Sharp, O. B. Beatty, Osborne, Lyne
This would prove South Adelaide's solitary major round win between 1904 and 1934 inclusive.

=== First Semi-Final Replay ===
1921 SAFL First Semi-Final Replay
Saturday, 24 September 1921	Port Adelaide	def. by	Norwood	Adelaide Oval (crowd: 31,000)
2.1 (13); 5.4 (34); 5.4 (34); 5.7 (37)	Q1; Q2; Q3; Final	3.5 (23); 4.7 (31); 8.12 (60); 12.16 (88)	Umpires: Raven
Keal 2, Allingham, Congear, L. C. Dayman	Goals	Bent 6, Bryant, B. A. Scott, Close, Packham, Gwynne, Potts
C. H. Beck, Adams, L. B. Beck, Bampton, Keal, Slade, Congear, Howie	Best	Bryant (best on ground), Toovey, Bent, Stephens, Dobson, W. Scott, Close, Schumacher, Heinrich, White
Allingham (broken collarbone)	Injuries
The minor premiers collapse completely after half-time as their five-man forward line score just three behinds after Allingham is seriously injured.

=== Final ===
1921 SAFL Second Semi-Final
Saturday, 1 October 1921	South Adelaide	def. by	Norwood	Adelaide Oval (crowd: 32,600)
0.8 (8); 2.8 (20); 3.10 (28); 4.13 (37)	Q1; Q2; Q3; Final	0.4 (4); 2.7 (19); 3.8 (26); 5.12 (42)	Umpires: Raven
Barnes, Waye, McKee, J. W. Daly	Goals	Bent 2, Sibley 2, Close
D. Moriarty, Williams, McKee, J. W. Daly, Oliver, J. V. Moriarty, Kay, Hansen	Best	Bryant (best on ground), Stephens, Dobson, White,
South miss a late shot that could have seen them in their first Grand Final for eighteen seasons after the shot looked to be going through until the very end. (Note: Had the shot gone through, it would have been the fourth finals draw in three seasons, yet, since 1922, only three senior SANFL finals have been tied at full time. (The first two were replayed as was the custom at this time, whilst extra time was played in the last one).)

=== Grand Final ===
1921 SAFL Grand Final
Saturday, 8 October 1921	Port Adelaide	def.	Norwood	Adelaide Oval (crowd: 34,000)
3.1 (19); 4.3 (27); 4.6 (30); 4.8 (32)	Q1; Q2; Q3; Final	0.4 (4); 1.5 (11); 2.6 (18); 3.6 (24)	Umpires: Raven; Best on Ground: Bampton
Keal 2, Dewar, Congear	Goals	Bent 3
Bampton, Oliver, Beck, Congear, Dayman, Keal, Hosking, Adams, Slade	Best	Dobson, Johns, Bryant, White, Toovey, Stephens, Schumacher, Scott, Grantley
