= Aaron Francis =

Australian rules footballer

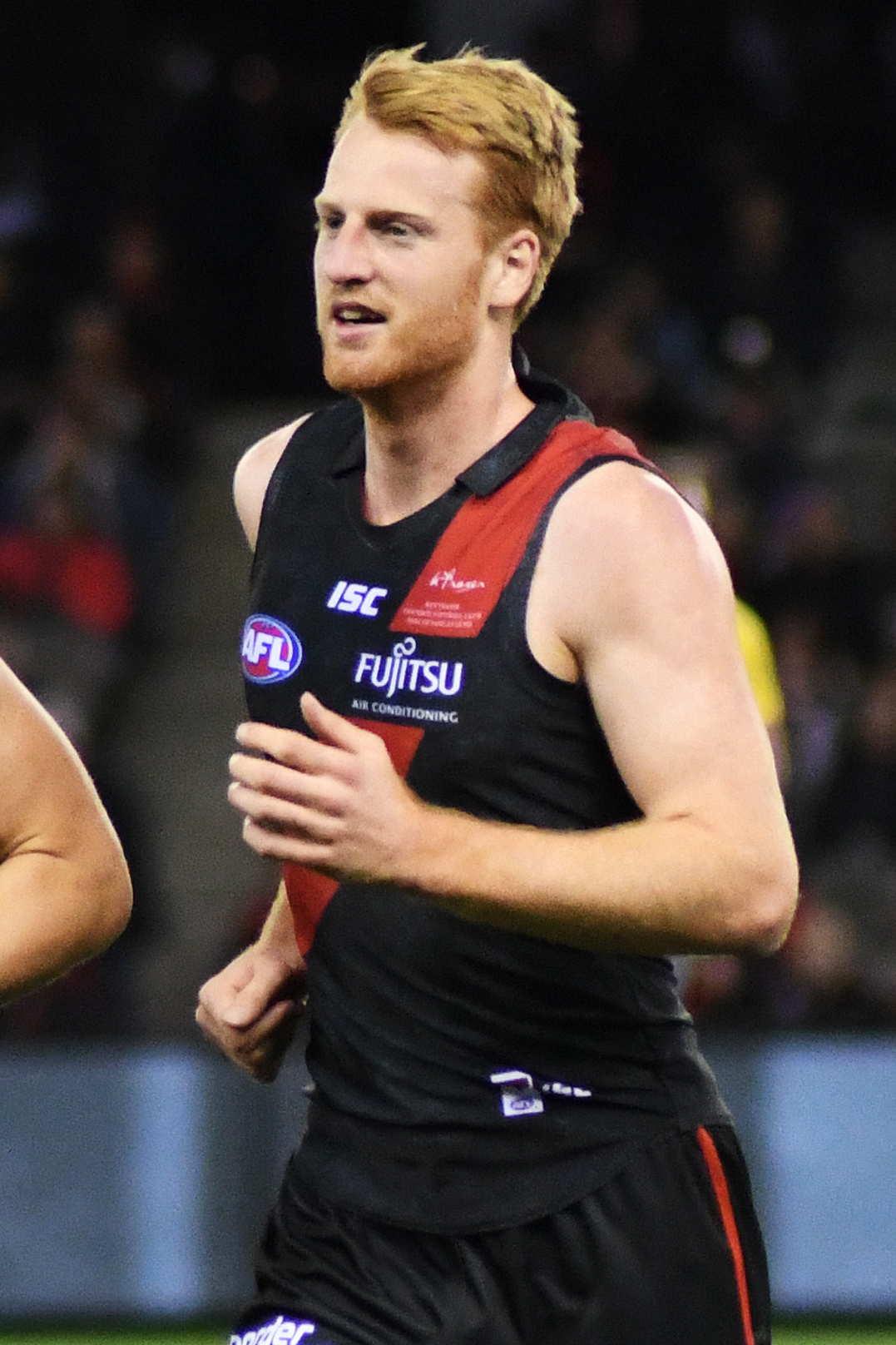
- Francis in August 2018

Personal information
- Full name: Aaron Russell Francis
- Born: 10 August 1997 (age 29)
- Original team: West Adelaide (SANFL)
- Draft: No. 6, 2015 national draft
- Height: 193 cm (6 ft 4 in)
- Weight: 92 kg (203 lb)
- Position: Key Defender

Playing career
| Years | Club | Games (Goals) |
| 2016–2022 | Essendon | 54 (12) |
| 2023–2025 | Sydney | 30 (6) |
| Total | | 84 (18) |

Career highlights
- AFL Rising Star nominee: 2018; SANFL premiership player: 2026

Aaron Russell Francis (born 10 August 1997) is a former professional Australian rules footballer who played for Essendon and the Sydney Swans in the Australian Football League (AFL).

== Early life ==
Francis was considered to be the best utility in his draft group, showing talent for South Australia, dominating games from both ends of the ground. He was named at centre half-forward in the All-Australian team during the 2015 AFL Under 18 Championships, often compared to AFL players Luke Hodge and Brendon Goddard in his junior year.

== Playing career ==
=== Essendon ===
Francis was drafted by the Essendon Football Club, the team he supported growing up, with their second selection and sixth overall in the 2015 national draft.

Francis made his debut in the thirty-seven point loss against the Brisbane Lions in round 18, 2016 at Etihad Stadium. Francis is the third of four boys, his older brother Hayden, who was a Brisbane supporter, died from cancer in 2014. After the match he said "It was a big day for the family, the way everything came together and they were very proud of me.’’

Due to personal struggles, coupled with failing to find opportunity in Essendon's best 22, during the 2017 AFL Trade Period, the difficult start to his AFL career culminated in Aaron requesting a trade away from the club he supported as a child, Essendon, to move back to South Australia. However, as little interest was shown by both the recent Grand Final Runners Up, Adelaide Football Club, or the Port Adelaide Football Club, Essendon chose not to release Aaron from his contract, which was due to expire at the conclusion of the 2019 AFL season because they still saw the untapped potential which swayed them to draft Aaron with pick 6 in the 2015 national draft and fully backed him to improve.

Before the commencement of the 2018 AFL season, Aaron, notified his teammates and Essendon of his decision to take some time away from Football due to his struggle with mental health - not doubt relating to his decision to request a trade a few months earlier. Surprisingly, Aaron spent this time mainly in Melbourne - including a stint coaching a local junior Basketball team - all while the club and his teammates stayed in contact. Fortunately for Essendon, Aaron returned to the club shortly after to resume training, but the club chose to take a cautious approach, giving him all the time to get back to full fitness before pushing for senior selection again.

After some strong performances in the VFL and toward the end of the AFL season, Aaron was selected to return to the senior team against Sydney in Round 19, with 5 games until the end of the 2018 Home and Away season and as Essendon's finals hopes faded. Aaron took this opportunity with both hands and delivered some moments of brilliance in the last 5 games of the season; including an eight mark effort against reigning premiers, Richmond Football Club, being named in Essendon's best, as well as soaring for a Mark of the Year contender against Port Adelaide in Round 23 over former Essendon player, Paddy Ryder. which to the AFL communities surprise, did not even receive a nomination in the lead up to the 2018 Brownlow Medal night, when Swan Isaac Heeney took out the award.

At the conclusion of the 2022 AFL season, Francis was traded to Sydney for a fresh opportunity after struggling to cement himself in Essendon's best 22.

=== Sydney ===
After 20 matches across his first two seasons at the Swans, Francis was delisted at the end of the 2024 season with the promise of being re-selected in the rookie draft. Having been re-drafted by the club onto the rookie list, Francis played a further 10 games in the 2025 season, before again being delisted at the end of the season.

== Statistics ==
Legend
| G | Goals | K | Kicks | D | Disposals | T | Tackles |
| B | Behinds | H | Handballs | M | Marks |

| Season | Team | No. | Games | Totals | | | | | | | Averages (per game) | | | | | | | Votes |
| Season | Team | No. | Games | G | B | K | H | D | M | T | G | B | K | H | D | M | T | Votes |
|---|---|---|---|---|---|---|---|---|---|---|---|---|---|---|---|---|---|---|
| 2016 | Essendon | 10 | 3 | 1 | 2 | 20 | 11 | 31 | 12 | 5 | 0.3 | 0.7 | 6.7 | 3.7 | 10.3 | 4.0 | 1.7 | 0 |
| 2017 | Essendon | 10 | 2 | 1 | 3 | 10 | 12 | 22 | 7 | 3 | 0.5 | 1.5 | 5.0 | 6.0 | 11.0 | 3.5 | 1.5 | 0 |
| 2018 | Essendon | 10 | 5 | 1 | 0 | 51 | 15 | 66 | 32 | 11 | 0.2 | 0.0 | 10.2 | 3.0 | 13.2 | 6.4 | 2.2 | 0 |
| 2019 | Essendon | 10 | 17 | 3 | 3 | 129 | 96 | 225 | 80 | 30 | 0.2 | 0.2 | 7.6 | 5.6 | 13.2 | 4.7 | 1.8 | 0 |
| 2020 (Note: The 2020 season was played with 17 home-and-away matches per team (down from 22) and 16-minute quarters with time on (down from 20-minute quarters with time on) due to the impact of the COVID-19 pandemic.) | Essendon | 10 | 8 | 0 | 0 | 44 | 35 | 79 | 27 | 14 | 0.0 | 0.0 | 5.5 | 4.4 | 9.9 | 3.4 | 1.8 | 0 |
| 2021 | Essendon | 10 | 15 | 2 | 6 | 99 | 70 | 169 | 70 | 17 | 0.1 | 0.4 | 6.6 | 4.7 | 11.3 | 4.7 | 1.1 | 0 |
| 2022 | Essendon | 10 | 4 | 4 | 3 | 15 | 13 | 28 | 16 | 6 | 1.0 | 0.8 | 3.8 | 3.3 | 7.0 | 4.0 | 1.5 | 0 |
| 2023 | Sydney | 10 | 15 | 1 | 4 | 88 | 53 | 141 | 61 | 19 | 0.1 | 0.3 | 5.9 | 3.5 | 9.4 | 4.1 | 1.3 | 0 |
| 2024 | Sydney | 10 | 5 | 0 | 0 | 35 | 21 | 56 | 27 | 5 | 0.0 | 0.0 | 7.0 | 4.2 | 11.2 | 5.4 | 1.0 | 0 |
| 2025 | Sydney | 10 | 10 | 5 | 8 | 55 | 33 | 88 | 33 | 12 | 0.5 | 0.8 | 5.5 | 3.3 | 8.8 | 3.3 | 1.2 | 0 |
| Career | | | 84 | 18 | 29 | 546 | 359 | 905 | 365 | 122 | 0.2 | 0.3 | 6.5 | 4.3 | 10.8 | 4.3 | 1.5 | 0 |
