= Clem Dayman =

Australian rules footballer

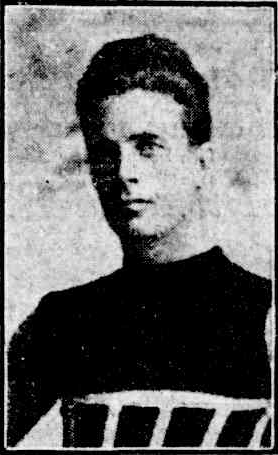

Personal information
- Full name: Clement Gordon Lyle Dayman
- Born: 30 December 1892; Salisbury, South Australia
- Died: 24 July 1967 (age 74)
- Position: Half-Forward / Follower

Playing career^{1}
Years	Club	Games (Goals)
1915–1919	North Adelaide	20 (16)
1921–1925	Port Adelaide	69 (71)
Total		89 (87)
- ^{1} Playing statistics correct to the end of 1925.

Career highlights
- Port Adelaide premiership player (1921); Port Adelaide best and fairest (1922); Port Adelaide captain-coach (1923); North Adelaide leading goal kicker (1919)

Clement Gordon Lyle Dayman (30 December 1892 – 24 July 1967) was an Australian rules footballer who played for the North Adelaide and Port Adelaide Football Clubs.

== North Adelaide (1915 – 1919) ==
Dayman first played in the opening round of 1915 for North Adelaide Football Club against Norwood at the Norwood Oval. He went on to play a further three games for the season in between playing for North Adelaide's B side. He enlisted to fight with the A.I.F. on 9 August 1915.

Suffering from shell shock he returned to Australia on 8 August 1918, and was medically discharged. He rejoined North Adelaide at the start of the 1919 season. He went on to play 16 out of a possible 20 games in 1919, and was rewarded with his efforts with the C.H Nitschke Medal for the Most Consistent and Brilliant Player of the season. He also topped the club's goal kicking for the year with 18 goals. The 1919 Challenge Final was to be Dayman's last game in red and white. He also represented the State against Victoria on 5 July on the Adelaide Oval, kicking 2 goals.

== Port Adelaide (1921 – 1925) ==
He applied for a clearance to Port Adelaide, and stood out of league football for the 1920 season waiting for the clearance. He played for Semaphore Central in the Amateurs during 1920. Dayman won a premiership in 1921. In 1923 Clem Dayman captain-coached Port Adelaide.

== Personal life ==
He was the brother of Les Dayman and was also the great-uncle of Glenelg and Adelaide Crows captain Chris McDermott.
