= Nick Lowden =

Personal information
- Full name: Nicholas Anthony Lowden
- Born: 10 February 2000
- Died: 3 August 2023 (aged 23)
- Original team: Gippsland Power
- Height: 191 cm (6 ft 3 in)
- Weight: 93 kg (205 lb)

Playing career
Years	Club	Games (Goals)
2022–2023	Norwood	22 (6)

Career highlights
- SANFL premiership player: 2022

Nicholas Anthony Lowden (10 February 2000 – 3 August 2023) was an Australian rules football player who played for the Casey Demons in the Victorian Football League (VFL) and the Norwood Football Club in the South Australian National Football League (SANFL).

== Football career ==
Lowden began playing football at age 8, for the Combined Saints Junior Football Club. He would go on to play for he Traralgon Football and Netball Club from u/16s division.

In 2015, Lowden started playing for Gippsland Power in the NAB League. In 2018 while playing for Gippsland, he suffered a severe concussion and was sidelined for six weeks. As a result of the concussion, he lost 8kg in weight, lost interest in school and his mental health suffered.

In 2019, he moved to the Casey Demons in the VFL, where he played several games from 2019 until the end of the 2021 season.

In 2022, Lowden joined the Norwood Football Club in the SANFL and played in the club's 2022 premiership. Lowden also played nine games in 2023. After suffering a calf injury in a match against South Adelaide, Lowden asked for permission to take leave to recover at home in Traralgon.

== Death ==
Lowden died by suicide on 3 August 2023, at age 23. Following his death, the SANFL paid tribute and a minute's silence was held before the start of every SANFL League match in Round 16. Norwood defeated South Adelaide 12.11 (83) to 12.9 (81) in their game that weekend.

Lowden's family donated his brain to scientific research into concussion.
