= 2026 SANFL Grand Final =

Australian rules football match

Norwood	Sturt
13.9 (87)	11.7 (73)
	1	2	3	4
NOR	4.4 (28)	5.5 (35)	8.6 (54)	13.9 (87)
STU	3.2 (20)	5.5 (35)	11.6 (72)	11.7 (73)
- Date: 20 September 2026, 2:30pm
- Stadium: Adelaide Oval
- Attendance: 38,340
- Umpires: Scott, Williams, Kelly, Rogers
- Coin toss won by: Norwood
- Kicked toward: Northern end

Ceremonies
- Pre-match entertainment: The Superjesus

Accolades
- Jack Oatey Medallist: Baynen Lowe (Norwood)

Broadcast in Australia
- Network: Seven Network

The 2026 SANFL Grand Final was an Australian rules football match that was contested between the Norwood Football Club and Sturt Football Club on Sunday, 20 September 2026. It was the 138th annual grand final of the South Australian National Football League (SANFL), staged to determine the premiers of the 2026 SANFL season. Norwood won by a margin of 14 points, overcoming an 18-point deficit at three quarter time, with key forward Tristan Binder kicking four goals in the final term, to win the game and claim its 32nd senior-grade premiership.

== Background ==
=== The two teams ===
Norwood entered the season following a two-point loss to Glenelg in the preliminary final, a result which only came about after the side narrowly qualified for the finals series off the back of an 8-10 win-loss record in the regular season. The Redlegs upended their playing list in the off-season and acquired several significant recruits, including former Australian Football League (AFL) defender with Essendon Aaron Francis, 2024 Magarey Medallist Harry Boyd, and midfielder Kade Dittmar, and the Redlegs went on to claim the minor premiership with a 15-3 win-loss record. They convincingly defeated Sturt by 29 points in the second semi-final to qualify for the grand final.

Sturt claimed their 16th senior league premiership in 2025, defeating Glenelg by 31 points in the grand final. They finished in third place in the 2026 home-and-away season, with a 13-5 win-loss record. The Double Blues defeated Glenelg by two points in the qualifying final, though were defeated by Norwood in the semi-final match. They then overcame a 19-point deficit in the second quarter against Woodville-West Torrens and powered away to a 39-point victory to qualify for the decider, with former Collingwood forward Ash Johnson prominent in the contest, kicking six goals for his side.

Aside from the aforementioned semi-final contest, the teams met twice in the regular season and split the matches one apiece, with Sturt winning the round one match at Norwood Oval by five points and Norwood winning the round nine match at Unley Oval by three points.

=== The rivalry and history ===
Norwood was seeking its 32nd senior premiership, which would bring them within four titles of the record established by Port Adelaide, while Sturt are intending to claim their 17th flag, and first back-to-back sequence since their successes in 2016 and 2017. Across all contests, the two clubs had played each other 296 times, with Norwood victorious in 164, Sturt in 128, and four draws.

Going into the Grand Final, the two teams had only ever met in the decider twice, with the 1978 grand final, won by Norwood by one point, the most recent. Sturt had only lost one game all year and were strong favourites to win on the day. The game is widely remembered for being highly controversial, with Norwood champion Phil Gallagher being paid a mark in the final stages, and going back to kick the goal. Umpire Des Foster later admitted he got the call wrong, and it shouldn't have been paid a mark.

=== Entertainment ===
South Australian rockers The Superjesus were announced as pre-match entertainment on 1 September. The group is fronted by Sarah McLeod, who spoke of her fond memories of supporting Norwood.

Former Norwood player Tim Webber and Sturt player Darren Thomas were announced as the Kia Cup Ambassadors on 18 September. For the first time in history, the winning side will be presented the Thomas Seymour Hill Trophy by their respective ambassador following the Grand Final. Webber was a member of the 2012, 2013 and 2014 Norwood premiership teams, and played 124 games for the club. Thomas is Group Managing Director of Thomas Foods International and played for Sturt in the 1990s.

== Match summary ==
The match was played in mild to warm conditions with dry weather and strong north-westerly winds, with the temperature reaching a top of 24.3°C.

Norwood started the stronger of the teams, dominating the inside-50 count by 15-8 and having 34 more disposals than Sturt in the opening quarter. Jackson Callow opened the scoring for Norwood after a swinging snap fell short and landed in his hands, while Sturt remained in touch through goals from Tom Emmett and Loch Rawlinson. Alex Swinnerton's goal on the quarter-time siren gave the Redlegs an 8-point lead, 4.4 (28) to 3.2 (20). In the second term, Sturt gradually wrestled back control as Josh Hone kicked on the run in traffic before Ash Johnson produced a memorable goal by taking a difficult mark running back with the flight and converting from a tight angle. Despite Norwood accumulating a 40-disposal advantage, five more inside-50s and nine more hit-outs, the Double Blues managed to level the scores by half-time at 5.5 (35) apiece.

Quick goals to Baynen Lowe and Declan Hamilton established a 13-point Norwood lead in the third quarter, which preceded a stunning period of Sturt dominance as the Double Blues kicked six of the next seven goals in the quarter to establish an 18-point lead at the final change; 11.6 (72) to 8.6 (54). Sturt forwards Emmett and Johnson appeared particularly threatening, kicking their third and second goals during the quarter of Sturt dominance. The game flipped dramatically in the last quarter however, as Norward forward Tristan Binder, who until this point in the game had little influence, scored a goal in the opening minute. He proceeded to kick three further goals from his next three kicks, including a long bouncing shot from near the boundary to give the Redlegs the decisive advantage in the contest. His last goal, and Norwood's fifth of the quarter, was kicked after the siren, producing the final score of Norwood 13.9 (87) to Sturt 11.7 (73).

=== Jack Oatey Medal ===
Norwood onballer Baynen Lowe was awarded the Jack Oatey Medal, polling a perfect 24 votes to win it ahead of Sturt's Zac Becker, who finished with 12 votes.

Jack Oatey Medal votes
Player	Votes	Total
Baynen Lowe	3, 3, 3, 3, 3, 3, 3, 3	24
Zac Becker	1, 1, 2, 2, 1, 2, 2, 1	12
Kade Dittmar	2, 1, 2, 1, 1, 2	9
Tristan Binder	2, 1	3

The panel of media representatives to judge the medal. included Matt Duldig – SANFL Executive General Manager Football, Zac Milbank – SANFL Media Producer, Andrew Capel - The Advertiser, John Casey - Seven, Rod Jameson – ABC Sport, Sam Jacobs – Triple M, Matt Panos – FIVEAA and Jack Hannath – SEN.

The Jack Oatey Medal was presented by 1997 medallist and Norwood premiership player John Cunningham.

Judge-by-judge voting
Judge	3 votes	2 votes	1 vote
Matt Duldig (SANFL GM Football)	Baynen Lowe	Kade Dittmar	Zac Becker
Zac Milbank (SANFL Media)	Baynen Lowe	Tristan Binder	Zac Becker
Andrew Capel (The Advertiser)	Baynen Lowe	Zac Becker	Tristan Binder
John Casey (Seven)	Baynen Lowe	Zac Becker	Kade Dittmar
Rod Jameson (ABC Sport)	Baynen Lowe	Kade Dittmar	Zac Becker
Sam Jacobs (Triple M)	Baynen Lowe	Kade Dittmar	Zac Becker
Matt Panos (FIVEAA)	Baynen Lowe	Zac Becker	Kade Dittmar
Jack Hannath (SEN SA)	Baynen Lowe	Zac Becker	Kade Dittmar

=== Umpires ===
2026 Hostplus SANFL League Grand Final Umpires
Field	Mitchell Scott	Benjamin Williams	Daniel Rogers	Tom Kelly	Harrison Hughes (emerg.)
Boundary	Jake Creasey	Nathan Becker	Tobin Dolman	Dylan Speck	
Goal	Michael Button	Matthew Cummins	Thomas Oxford (emerg.)		

== Scorecard ==
2026 SANFL Grand Final
Sunday 20 September (2:30 pm)	Norwood	def.	Sturt	Adelaide Oval (crowd: 38,340)
4.4 (28); 5.5 (35); 8.6 (54); 13.9 (87)	Q1; Q2; Q3; Final	3.2 (20); 5.5 (35); 11.6 (72); 11.7 (73)	Jack Oatey Medal: Baynen Lowe (Norwood); Television broadcast: Seven Network
Binder 4 Callow, Lowe 2 Hamilton, Heard, Ling, Murley, Swinnerton 1	Goals	Emmett 3 Hone, Johnson 2 Burrows, Fahey-Sparks, McEntee, Rawlinson 1
The 38,340 spectators in attendance was the biggest since 2019 and the 10th time in 14 years the Grand Final attracted over 30,000 fans.

== Teams ==
Norwood announced an unchanged lineup from the one which defeated Sturt in the second semi-final. Sturt had been dogged by injury in the lead up to the decider, firstly to key ruckman Amos Doyle, who injured his neck in the second semi-final and missed the preliminary final. Running midfielder Jared Dakin tore his hamstring in the first minute of the game, ruling him out of the Grand Final, while another injury to key back Casey Voss had him in doubt for selection. Both Doyle and Voss were named in the team, however only Voss played. Jed McEntee was brought in as replacement for Jared Dakin.

Norwood
B:	Cooper Murley	Aaron Francis	Alec Wright
HB:	Matthew Ling	Jack Heard	Alastair Lord
C:	Declan Hamilton	Nik Rokahr	Connor Ling
HF:	Jayden Gale	Finn Heard	Alex Swinnerton
F:	Tristan Binder	Jackson Callow	Jacob Kennerley
Foll:	Harry Boyd	Baynen Lowe	Kade Dittmar
Int:	Liam Ling	Thomas Donnelly	Charlie Molan
Int:	Mitchell Nicholas		
Coach:	Jade Sheedy		

Sturt
B:	Rory Illman	Will Coomblas	Luke Edmonds
HB:	Alex Holt	Zac Becker	Casey Voss
C:	Loch Rawlinson	Tom Lewis	Luca Slade
HF:	Josh Hone	Lachlan Burrows	Sam Conforti
F:	Ash Johnson	Oliver Grivell	Tom Emmett
Foll:	Dan Fahey-Sparks	Will Snelling	Marty Frederick
Int:	Kobe McEntee	Nick Sadler	Sam Waltham
Int:	Jed McEntee		
Coach:	Marty Mattner		

== Media coverage ==
The Grand Final will be broadcast locally on Channel 7 and nationally through 7+. Four radio stations will broadcast the match too - SEN SA, FIVEAA, ABC Adelaide and Triple M.

Channel 7 had broadcast the competition all throughout the minor round, and finals, as had SEN SA. FIVEAA broadcast the finals series, while ABC and Triple M broadcast just the Grand Final.

Broadcast teams
Station	Play-by-play callers	Special comments	Boundary rider
Channel 7	John Casey Mark Soderstrom	Tim Ginever Orazio Fantasia	Andrew Hayes
SEN SA	David Wildy Paul Bonsor	Jack Hannath	n/a
FIVEAA	Sam Tugwell Patrick Goldsmith	Matt Panos	Sam Daddow
ABC Adelaide	Aaron Bryans Tom Wilson	Rod Jamieson Nathan Bassett	Braden Ingram
Triple M	Brenton Yates	Sam Jacobs Andrew Jarman	Jarryd Nerlich
