= Tom Everuss =

Australian rules footballer

Personal information
- Full name: Thomas James Everuss
- Born: 18 October 1903; Broken Hill, New South Wales
- Died: 18 May 1979 (aged 75); Umina Beach, New South Wales
- Original team: South Broken Hill
- Height: 178 cm (5 ft 10 in)
- Weight: 76 kg (168 lb)
- Position: Defender

Playing career^{1}
Years	Club	Games (Goals)
1926	Hawthorn	17 (0)
- ^{1} Playing statistics correct to the end of 1926.

Thomas James Everuss (18 October 1903 – 18 May 1979) was an Australian rules footballer who played with Hawthorn in the Victorian Football League (VFL).

== Early life ==
The son of Thomas James Everuss (1870–1933), and Margaret Priscilla Eversuss (1874–1943), née Whetter, Thomas James Everuss was born in Broken Hill on 18 October 1903.

He married Jean Isobel Glenn (1908-1967), in Broken Hill, on 29 January 1929. They had three children.

== Football ==
After commencing his career with South Broken Hill Football Club, Everuss and his team-mate Lindsay Beck both joined Hawthorn at the start of the 1926 VFL season. He made his debut against North Melbourne in Round 2; he played every game for the remainder of the season.

== Fireman ==
Everuss returned to Broken Hill in September 1926, where he resumed his work as a fireman. He lived in South Broken Hill until he transferred to the fire station at South Bankstown where he served for twenty years. Upon retirement he moved to Umina where he lived until his death in 1979.

== Death ==
He died at Umina Beach, New South Wales on 18 May 1979.
