= 2022 SANFL Grand Final =

North Adelaide	Norwood
8.10 (58)	8.11 (59)
	1	2	3	4
NTH	4.2 (26)	4.7 (31)	6.10 (46)	8.10 (58)
NOR	2.3 (15)	3.6 (24)	5.9 (39)	8.11 (59)
- Date: 18, September, 3:00pm
- Stadium: Adelaide Oval
- Attendance: 27,479
- Umpires: Bowen, Bryce, Scott

Accolades
- Jack Oatey Medallist: Harry Boyd (Norwood)

Broadcast in Australia
- Network: Seven Network

The 2022 South Australian National Football League (SANFL) grand final was an Australian rules football match played at Adelaide Oval on Sunday, 18 September to determine the premiers for the 2022 SANFL season.

The match was contested by North Adelaide and Norwood.

== Teams ==
Norwood
B:	Cameron Ball	Jack Heard	Sam Morris
HB:	Declan Hamilton	Tom Donnelly	Nick Lowden
C:	Matthew Nunn (c)	Jacob Kennerley	Josh Richards
HF:	Henry Nelligan	Ben Jarvis	Matthew Panos
F:	Baynen Lowe	Connor McLean	Luke Surman
Foll:	Harry Boyd	Nik Rokahr	Jay Rantall
Res:	Pierce Seymour	Brodie Carroll	Jai Larkins
Coach:	Jade Rawlings		

North Adelaide
B:	Cameron Craig	Reed van Huisstede	Lachlan Wilsdon
HB:	Alex Spina (c)	Karl Finlay	Harrison Magor
C:	Frank Szekely	Campbell Combe	Harrison Wigg
HF:	Sam McInerney	Dyson Hilder	Will Combe
F:	Lee Minervini	Keenan Ramsey	Nigel Lockyer
Foll:	Mitch Harvey	Andrew Moore	Aaron Young
Res:	Tom Brazel	Harrison Elbrow	Lachlan Grubb
Coach:	Jacob Surjan		

== Goal kickers ==
- Norwood: Surman 2, Jarvis, Nunn, Panos, Richards, Rokahr, Rantall
- North Adelaide: Harvey 2, Ramsey 2, Young, Lockyer, McInerney, Elbrow

== Best players ==
- Norwood: Boyd, Rokahr, Panos, Kennerley, Hamilton, Heard
- North Adelaide: Combe, Moore, Wigg, Ramsey, Lockyer

== Jack Oatey Medal ==
- Harry Boyd (Norwood)
