= Bert Olds =

Australian rules footballer

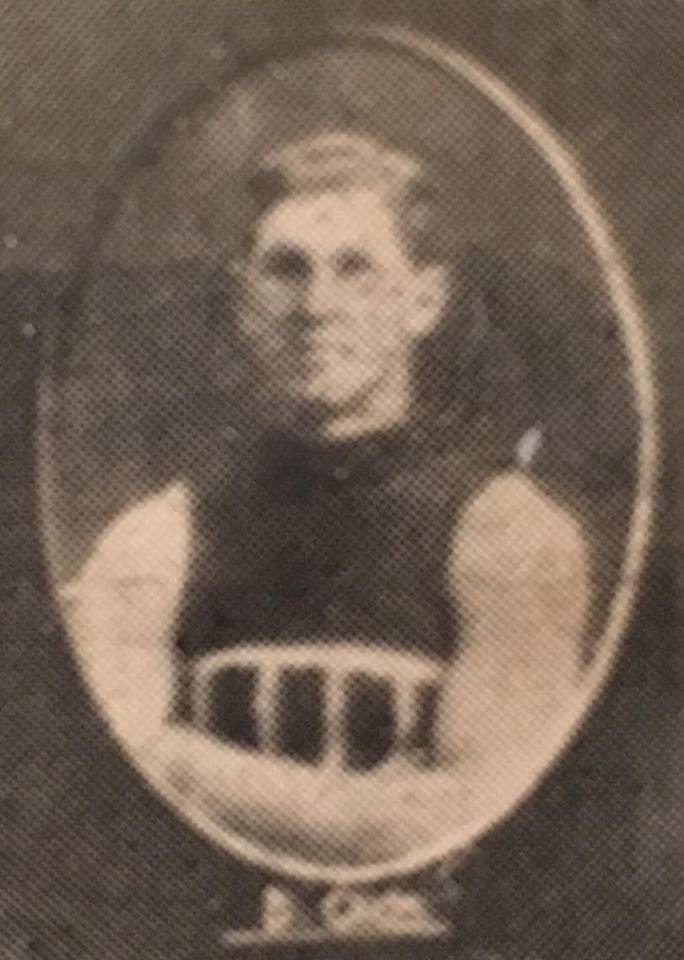
- Bert Olds from the 1921 Port Adelaide SAFL premiership poster.

Personal information
- Full name: Albert Yates Olds
- Born: 8 September 1891; Moonta, South Australia
- Died: 22 June 1953 (aged 61); Broken Hill, New South Wales
- Original team: South Broken Hill

Playing career
Years	Club	Games (Goals)
1919–1922	Port Adelaide	52

Albert Yates Olds (8 September 1891 – 22 June 1953) was an Australian rules footballer for who played for the Port Adelaide Football Club in the South Australian Football League (SAFL). He captained the club in 1920.
