= 1899 SAFA Grand Final =

South Adelaide	Norwood
5.12 (42)	2.2 (14)
	1	2	3	4
STH	1.6 (12)	1.9 (15)	2.9 (21)	5.12 (42)
NOR	0.0 (0)	1.0 (6)	1.0 (6)	2.2 (14)
- Date: Saturday, 9 September (2:10 pm)
- Stadium: Adelaide Oval

The 1899 SAFL Grand Final was an Australian rules football competition. South Adelaide beat Norwood 42 to 14.
