= 1905 SAFA Grand Final =

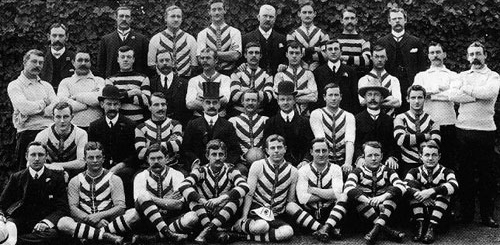

North Adelaide	Port Adelaide
6.8 (44)	1.6 (12)
	1	2	3	4
NA	1.1 (7)	2.7 (19)	4.7 (27)	6.8 (44)
PTA	1.1 (7)	1.1 (7)	1.2 (8)	1.6 (12)
- Date: Saturday, 9 September (2:10 pm)
- Stadium: Adelaide Oval
- Attendance: 12,000

The 1905 SAFA Grand Final was an Australian rules football competition. North Adelaide beat Port Adelaide by 44 to 12.

== Teams ==
1905 Premiership Team
B:	Alec Ewers	Jimmy Matthews	Charles Fotheringham
HB:	Tom MacKenzie	Fred Odlum	Herb Ward
C:	Jack Rees	Edward MacKenzie	Norman Pash
HF:	Charlie Jessop	Vern Drew	William "Peter" Fleet
F:	Ernie Johns	Anthony "Boss" Daly	Jack "Dinny" Reedman (c)
Foll:	John Earl	Frank Young	Harold "Araby" Pash
Coach:	n/a		
