= 1900 SAFA Grand Final =

North Adelaide	South Adelaide
4.3 (27)	1.8 (14)
	1	2	3	4
NTH	1.0 (6)	1.1 (7)	1.2 (8)	4.3 (27)
STH	0.2 (2)	0.3 (3)	0.5 (5)	1.8 (14)
- Date: Saturday, 8 September (2:10 pm)
- Stadium: Adelaide Oval
- Attendance: 7,000

The 1900 SAFL Grand Final was an Australian rules football competition. North Adelaide beat South Adelaide 27 to 14.

== Teams ==
1900 Premiership Team
B:	William Baker	George Carter	Sam Heseltine
HB:	Norm Clark	Ernie Jones (c)	Norman Claxton
C:	Harry Wilmshurst	Ernie Mitchell	Harold "Araby" Pash
HF:	William Dawkins	Jimmy Matthews	Thomas McNamara
F:	Bill Shaw	Norman Pash	Frederick Dickenson
Foll:	Jack "Dinny" Reedman	Harry Mumme	Charles "Joe" Coates
Coach:	n/a		
