= Peter Bampton =

Australian rules footballer

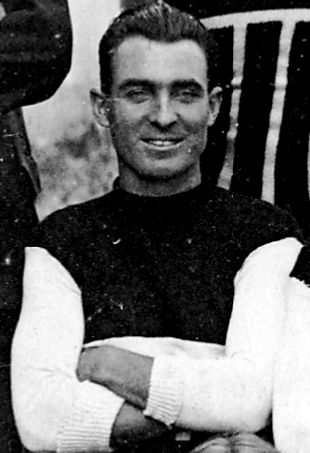

Personal information
- Full name: Peter Aloysius Bampton
- Born: 22 June 1896; Port Adelaide, South Australia
- Died: 2 January 1968 (aged 71)
- Position: Centre Half-Back

Playing career^{1}
Years	Club	Games (Goals)
1919–1928	Port Adelaide	137 (5)
- ^{1} Playing statistics correct to the end of 1928.

Career highlights
- Magarey Medal (1925); Port Adelaide best & fairest (1925); Port Adelaide premiership player (1921)

Peter Aloysius Bampton (22 June 1896 – 2 January 1968) was an Australian rules footballer who played with Port Adelaide in the SANFL during the 1920s.

== Football ==
Bampton played a total of 137 games for Port Adelaide, often at centre half back. He made his debut during the 1919 season and was a member of their 1921 premiership side.

In 1925 he had his best season, being awarded a retrospective Magarey Medal in 1998 after originally finishing runner up on a count back.

He was Port Adelaide captain in 1927 and played his last game for the club the following season.

During his career he represented South Australia at interstate football on 10 occasions.

== See also ==
- 1927 Melbourne Carnival
