= Sam Howie =

Australian rules footballer (1889–1943)

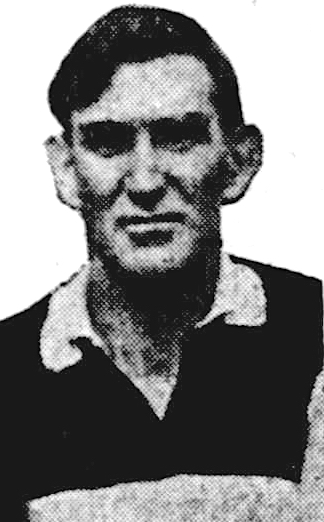

Personal information
- Full name: Samuel William Howie
- Born: 10 June 1889; Broken Hill, New South Wales
- Died: 15 August 1943 (aged 54); Woodville, South Australia
- Original team: West Broken Hill

Playing career
Years	Club	Games (Goals)
1913–1914, 1919–1923	Port Adelaide	

Career highlights
- Port Adelaide premiership player (1921)

Samuel William Howie (10 June 1889 – 15 August 1943) was an Australian rules footballer for Port Adelaide and captain of the club in 1922.

== Family ==
The son of David Howie (1852–1920), and Amanda Lavinia Howie (1854–1938), née Green, Samuel William Howie was born at Broken Hill on 10 June 1889.

He married Ethel May Dixon (1889–1975) on 5 March 1920. They had three sons: William Edward Howie (1921–1921), Allan Dixon Howie (1923–1945), and Robert John Howie (1924–1981).

== Death ==
He collapsed and died during a Volunteer Defence Corps (V.D.C.) parade at Woodville on 15 August 1943. He was buried, with full military honours at Adelaide's Centennial Park Cemetery.
