= Les Dayman =

Australian rules footballer (1901–1979)

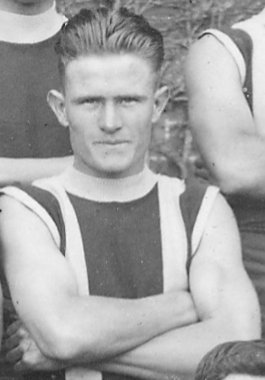

Personal information
- Full name: Leslie Clarence Dayman
- Born: 28 October 1901; Salisbury, South Australia
- Died: 11 March 1979 (aged 77); Alberton, South Australia
- Original team: Salisbury
- Height: 183 cm (6 ft 0 in)
- Weight: 82 kg (181 lb)
- Position: Key position forward/Ruckman

Playing career^{1}
Years	Club	Games (Goals)
1921–1931 & 1937	Port Adelaide	166 (401)
1932–1934	Footscray	34 (68)
1934	Coburg	12 (13)
Total		212 (482)

Representative team honours
Years	Team	Games (Goals)
1923–1931	South Australia	19 (30)
- ^{1} Playing statistics correct to the end of 1937.

Career highlights
- South Australian Football Hall of Fame (Inaugural inductee); Port Adelaide greatest team (Centre half forward); 2× Port Adelaide premiership player (1921, 1928); 3× Port Adelaide best and fairest (1923, 1924, 1928); 4× Port Adelaide leading goal kicker (1928, 1929, 1930, 1931); 1× Footscray leading goal kicker (1932); SANFL leading goalkicker (1929)

Leslie Clarence "Bro" Dayman (28 October 1901 – 11 March 1979) was an Australian Rules footballer who played for Port Adelaide in the South Australian National Football League (SANFL) and Footscray in the Victorian Football League (VFL).

== Family ==
The fifth of the seven children of Arthur Ernest Dayman, and Edith Annie Dayman, née Smitham, Leslie Clarence Dayman was born at Salisbury, South Australia on 28 October 1901.

His eldest brother, Clem Dayman, also played with Port Adelaide.

Dayman married Maria Jane "Ria" Diks on 2 January 1932. Their son, Leslie Dayman, was the notable Australian stage, screen and TV actor, and their grandson, Chris McDermott, was the inaugural captain of Adelaide Crows.

== Football ==
=== Port Adelaide ===
Les Dayman started his career at Port Adelaide in 1921, after arriving from Salisbury. During that year he was a member of the club's premiership team. He played beside his brother Clem at the club during the 1920s and was used mostly as a ruckman or in the key forward positions. On three occasions Dayman won Port Adelaide's 'Best and Fairest' award and also topped their goal-kicking four times. He was the league's top goal-kicker in 1929 with 86 goals.

A regular South Australian interstate representative, he made a total of 19 appearances and kicked 30 goals for his state.

=== Footscray ===
Footscray acquired his services in 1932 and he had a solid first season, kicking a bag of five against Fitzroy in his second game and topping the club's goal-kicking with 37 majors.

=== Victorian Football Association ===
Following three years with Footscray, Dayman was cleared to Victorian Football Association (VFA) club Coburg in late June 1934. He played in Coburg's losing 1934 VFA grand final loss against Northcote.

Dayman was announced as captain-coach of Maryborough in the Bendigo Football League in late March 1935 but was instead cleared from Coburg to fellow VFA club Yarraville in early April 1935 and later played with VFA club Sunshine.

=== Port Adelaide (1937) ===
After playing for Newells Football Club in the Footscray District Football League (FDFL) in 1936, Dayman returned to Port Adelaide in 1937, making one further appearance for the seniors, before going on to serve the club in an off field capacity.

Dayman was awarded Port Adelaide Football Club Life Membership in 1938.

== Military service ==
Dayman enlisted in the Australian army on 8 April 1942 and served as a private in 1 Battalion Volunteer Defence Corps until his discharge on 14 September 1944.

== Death ==
He died at Alberton, South Australia on 11 March 1979.

== Honours ==
In 2002 he was one of the inaugural inductees into the South Australian Football Hall of Fame.

He was selected at centre half-forward in Port Adelaide's official "Greatest Team", which took into account the period 1870 to 2000.
