= 1972 SANFL Grand Final =

Australian football match

North Adelaide	Port Adelaide
19.14 (128)	10.12 (72)
	1	2	3	4
NA	3.3 (18)	5.6 (36)	13.11 (89)	19.14 (128)
PTA	4.6 (30)	6.8 (44)	8.9 (57)	10.12 (72)
- Date: Saturday, 30 September (2:10 pm)
- Stadium: Adelaide Oval
- Attendance: 55,790

The 1972 SANFL Grand Final was an Australian rules football competition. North Adelaide beat Port Adelaide by 128 to 72.

== Teams ==
1972 Premiership Team
B:	Geoff Paull (6)	Bob Hammond (29)	John Spry (38)
HB:	Geoff Strang (3)	Bohdan Jaworskyj (27)	Allan Howard (15)
C:	John Phillips (7)	Barrie Robran (10)	Barry Stringer (9)
HF:	Darryl Webb (19)	Rodney Robran (20)	Adrian Rebbeck (18)
F:	Barry Hearl (14)	Dennis Sachse (30)	David Marsh (36)
Foll:	Garry Sporn (26)	John Plummer (13)	Terry von Bertouch (2)
Int:	Rick Schubert (37)	Kevin Barr (17)	
Coach:	Mike Patterson		
