= 1971 SANFL Grand Final =

| North Adelaide | Port Adelaide |
|---|---|
| 10.19 (79) | 9.5 (59) |
| | 1 | 2 | 3 | 4 |
|---|---|---|---|---|
| NA | 4.6 (30) | 6.11 (47) | 9.18 (72) | 10.19 (79) |
| PTA | 0.1 (1) | 0.3 (3) | 2.4 (16) | 9.5 (59) |
- Date: Saturday, 25 September (2:10 pm)
- Stadium: Adelaide Oval
- Attendance: 52,228

The 1971 SANFL Grand Final was an Australian rules football competition. North Adelaide beat Port Adelaide by 79 to 59.

== Teams ==
1971 Premiership Team
| B: | Geoff Paull (6) | Bob Hammond (29) | Peter Anderson (3) |
| HB: | David Burns (28) | Bohdan Jaworskyj (27) | Allan Howard (15) |
| C: | John Phillips (7) | Kym Lehmann (11) | Barry Stringer (9) |
| HF: | Terry Collins (17) | Barrie Robran (10) | Adrian Rebbeck (18) |
| F: | Mike Patterson (c) (25) | Neil Sachse (12) | Ken Francou (21) |
| Foll: | Garry Sporn (26) | Darryl Webb (19) | Terry von Bertouch (2) |
| Int: | Arch Wilkey (23) | Barry Hearl (14) | |
| Coach: | Mike Patterson | | |
