= Clifford Keal =

Australian rules footballer, born 1901

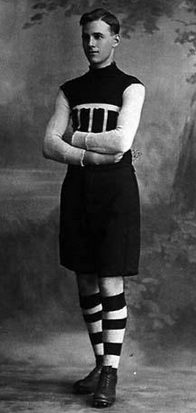

Personal information
- Full name: Clifford Hurst Keal
- Nickname: Cliff
- Born: 2 March 1901; Yatala, South Australia, Australia
- Died: 1 October 1965 (aged 64); South Australia, Australia

Playing career
Years	Club	Games (Goals)
1920–1929	Port Adelaide	147 (90)

Representative team honours
Years	Team	Games (Goals)
1926–1927	South Australia	4

Career highlights
- Port Adelaide premiership player (1921, 1928); Port Adelaide best and fairest (1927)

Clifford Hurst Keal (2 March 1901 – 3 October 1965) was an Australian rules footballer for the Port Adelaide Football Club between 1920 and 1929.

== Football ==
He served as captain from 1924 to 1925, won the clubs best and fairest in 1927 and was a premiership player for the club in 1921 and 1928. Clifford Keal began a Port Adelaide tradition when he captained the club by wearing the number 1 on his guernsey.

== See also ==
- 1927 Melbourne Carnival
