= 1920 SAFL Grand Final =

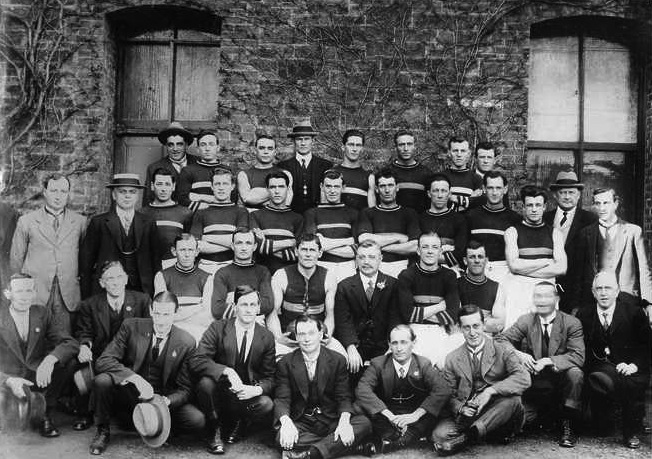

North Adelaide	Norwood
9.15 (69)	3.3 (21)
	1	2	3	4
NTH	1.3 (9)	5.8 (38)	7.12 (54)	9.15 (69)
NOR	1.1 (7)	2.1 (13)	3.1 (19)	3.3 (21)
- Date: Saturday, 28 September
- Stadium: Adelaide Oval
- Attendance: 31,000

The 1920 SAFL Grand Final was an Australian rules football competition. North Adelaide beat Norwood 69 to 21.

== Teams ==
1920 Premiership Team
B:	Ivan Davey (3)	Richard Foale (7)	Leslie Reedman (18)
HB:	Charles Penery (17)	Jack "Snowy" Hamilton (9)	David Crawford (2)
C:	Russell Fuss (6)	Percy Lewis (12)	Alby Fooks (21)
HF:	Frank Haines (10)	Percy Frost (23)	Glyn Trescowthick (13)
F:	Lloyd Davies (14)	Dan O'Brien (19)	Laurence Sprigg (16)
Foll:	Tom Leahy (c) (1)	Cecil Curnow (20)	Vernon Maloney (4)
Coach:	Albert Klose		
