= 1922 SAFL Grand Final =

Norwood	West Adelaide
9.7 (61)	2.16 (28)
	1	2	3	4
NOR	2.0 (12)	4.5 (29)	4.6 (30)	9.7 (61)
WA	0.4 (4)	0.8 (8)	2.14 (26)	2.16 (28)
- Date: Saturday, 30 September
- Stadium: Adelaide Oval
- Attendance: 31,000

The 1922 SAFL Grand Final was an Australian rules football game contested between the Norwood Football Club and the West Adelaide Football Club, held at the Adelaide Oval in Adelaide on the 30 September 1922. It was the 24th annual Grand Final of the South Australian Football League, staged to determine the premiers for the 1922 SAFL season. The match, attended by 31,000 spectators, was won by Norwood by a margin of 33 points, marking the clubs fifteenth premiership victory.
