= 2025 Port Adelaide Football Club season =

Port Adelaide Football Club
2025 season
- President: David Koch
- Coach: Ken Hinkley (AFL); Lauren Arnell (AFLW); Hamish Hartlett (SANFL)
- Captains: Connor Rozee (AFL); Justine Mules-Robinson (AFLW); Nick Moore (SANFL)
- Home grounds: Adelaide Oval (AFL); Alberton Oval (AFLW); Alberton Oval (SANFL)
- Regular season: 13th (AFL); 10th (AFLW); 6th (SANFL)
- Finals series: DNQ (AFL); DNQ (AFLW); DNQ (SANFL)
- Average home attendance: 36,565

The 2025 Port Adelaide Football Club season was the club's 29th season in the Australian Football League (AFL) and the 155th year since its inception in 1870. The club also fielded its reserves men's team in the South Australian National Football League (SANFL) and its women's team in the AFL Women's (AFLW).

Port Adelaide entered the season off the back of preliminary final defeats to Sydney and North Melbourne in the AFL and AFLW respectively, and a last-place finish in the SANFL. The season marked the 13th and final year of Ken Hinkley's tenure as senior coach of the AFL team. The club announced Hinkley would finish in the role at the end of the season, and be replaced by former Port Adelaide premiership player Josh Carr. Along with Adelaide, the club hosted 12 home AFL games during the season, including a Gather Round fixture against Hawthorn.

In the AFL, the Power suffered from multiple losses in excess of 70 points and finished with 9 wins and 14 losses, the worst result under Hinkley's tenure, and as a result failed to qualify for the finals in 13th place on the ladder. In the SANFL, the Magpies had a slow start to the season though recovered to finish in sixth position and narrowly miss out on finals. In the AFLW, the side was unable to replicate the form that saw them qualify for finals the previous season; they won six of their twelve matches to finish in 10th place and miss out on the top eight by percentage. Forward Gemma Houghton became the first player in league history to kick 100 career goals, registering the achievement with a goal after the siren in the team's final match of the season.

== Squads ==
=== AFL ===
2025 Port Adelaide Football Club AFL squad
Senior list		Rookie list	Coaching staff
1 Connor Rozee (c); 2 Sam Powell-Pepper; 3 Ryan Burton; 4 Todd Marshall; 5 Joe Berry; 6 Kane Farrell; 7 Jase Burgoyne; 8 Josh Sinn; 9 Zak Butters (vc); 10 Travis Boak; 11 Jeremy Finlayson; 12 Jack Lukosius; 13 Ivan Soldo; 14 Miles Bergman; 15 Willie Rioli; 16 Ollie Wines; 17 Jack Whitlock; 18 Jason Horne-Francis; 19 Mitch Georgiades	21 Aliir Aliir; 24 Jordon Sweet; 25 Brandon Zerk-Thatcher; 26 Lachlan Charleson; 27 Esava Ratugolea; 28 Willem Drew; 29 Thomas Anastasopoulos; 30 Ollie Lord; 31 Christian Moraes; 32 Rory Atkins; 33 Darcy Byrne-Jones; 34 Lachie Jones; 35 Joe Richards; 36 Will Lorenz; 38 Dante Visentini; 39 Hugh Jackson; 41 Jed McEntee; 44 Jackson Mead	22 Logan Evans; 23 Dylan Williams; 37 Tom Cochrane; 40 Benny Barrett (B); 42 Jacob Moss (B); 45 Xavier Walsh	Head coach: Ken Hinkley; Assistant coach: Josh Carr (midfield); Chad Cornes (forwards); Tyson Goldsack (defence); Matthew Lobbe (rucks); Hamish Hartlett (SANFL coach); Cameron Sutcliffe (development); Jason Williams (development); Legend: (c) Captain(s); (vc) Vice-captain(s); (B) Category B rookie; italics - Inactive player list; Long-term injury; (ret.) Retired; Updated: 7 January 2025; Source(s):

=== SANFL ===
2025 Port Adelaide Football Club SANFL squad
SANFL list (Note: Port Adelaide AFL-listed players (not selected to play AFL) are allowed to play for the SANFL squad.)		Coaching Staff
Nick Moore (c); Jez McLennan; Jack Watkins; Oli Francou; Rome Burgoyne; Kyle Marshall; Jake Weidemann; Dustin Launer; Bailey Chamberlain; Josh Byrne; Brayden Calvett; Kye Roberts	Shay Linke; Nic Couroupis; Hugh Ferrari; Aidan Turner; Will O’Brien; Ryan Carnelly; Miller Carter; Harry Williams; Heath Growden; Austin Harris; Mack Bowman; Cormack O’Reilly	Head coach: Hamish Hartlett; Legend: (c) Captain(s); (vc) Vice-captain(s); Updated: 6 March 2025; Source(s):

=== AFLW ===
2025 Port Adelaide Football Club AFLW squad
Senior list		Coaching staff
1 Justine Mules-Robinson (c); 2 Ebony O'Dea; 3 Jasmine Evans; 4 Piper Window; 5 Abbey Dowrick; 6 Molly Brooksby; 7 Lily Paterson; 8 Ashleigh Woodland; 9 Maria Moloney; 10 Indy Tahau; 11 Caitlyn Wendland; 12 Ella Heads; 13 Jasmin Stewart; 14 Janelle Cuthbertson; 15 Julia Teakle	16 Shineah Goody; 17 Ella Boag; 18 Jemma Charity; 20 Sachi Syme; 21 Amelie Borg; 22 Lauren Young; 23 Alissa Brook; 27 Gemma Houghton; 28 Cheyenne Hammond; 29 Matilda Scholz; 30 Teagan Germech; 31 Chloe Gaunt; 32 Jasmine Sowden; 35 Kirsty Lamb; 44 Katelyn Pope	Head coach: Lauren Arnell; Assistant coaches: Sam Virgo (assistant coach); Daniel Merrett (assistant coach); Braedon Talbot (assistant coach); Troy Wilkey (development coach); Kelly Barltrop (development coach); Legend: (c) Captain(s); (vc) Vice-captain(s); (i) Inactive player; Updated: 1 November 2026; Source(s): Port Adelaide AFLW

== AFL season ==
=== Pre-season ===
**Date and time**	**Opponent**	**Scores** (Port Adelaide's scores indicated in **bold**)			**Venue**	**Ref.**
**Date and time**	**Opponent**	Home	Away	Result	**Venue**	**Ref.**
Friday, 21 February (5:00 pm)	Adelaide	22.11 (143)	**14.15 (99)**	Lost by 44 points	Summit Sport and Recreation Park (A)	
Saturday, 1 March (3:10 pm)	St Kilda	7.7 (49)	**14.9 (93)**	Won by 44 points	RSEA Park (A)	

=== Regular season ===
**Rd**	**Date and time**	**Opponent**	**Scores** (Port Adelaide's scores indicated in **bold**)			**Venue**	**Attendance**	**Ladder**	**Ref.**
**Rd**	**Date and time**	**Opponent**	Home	Away	Result	**Venue**	**Attendance**	**Ladder**	**Ref.**
OR	Bye							–	
1	Saturday, 15 March (7:35 pm)	Collingwood	21.10 (136)	**6.9 (45)**	Lost by 91 points	Melbourne Cricket Ground (A)	63,282	18th	
2	Saturday, 22 March (3:45 pm)	Richmond	**21.14 (140)**	9.14 (68)	Won by 72 points	Adelaide Oval (H)	37,342	11th	
3	Thursday, 27 March (7:30 pm)	Essendon	9.18 (72)	**8.12 (60)**	Lost by 12 points	Marvel Stadium (A)	25,114	12th	
4	Sunday, 6 April (2:50 pm)	St Kilda	**10.12 (72)**	13.11 (89)	Lost by 17 points	Adelaide Oval (H)	34,201	12th	
5	Sunday, 13 April (7:20 pm)	Hawthorn	**18.13 (121)**	14.7 (91)	Won by 30 points	Adelaide Oval (H)	47,671	11th	
6	Sunday, 20 April (3:20 pm)	Sydney	10.17 (77)	**13.7 (85)**	Won by 8 points	Sydney Cricket Ground (A)	36,636	10th	
7	Saturday, 26 April (3:45 pm)	North Melbourne	**14.13 (97)**	13.10 (88)	Won by 9 points	Adelaide Oval (H)	35,004	10th	
8	Saturday, 3 May (1:20 pm)	Western Bulldogs	20.11 (131)	**5.11 (41)**	Lost by 90 points	Mars Stadium (A)	4,814	12th	
9	Saturday, 10 May (7:40 pm)	Adelaide	**12.12 (84)**	13.11 (89)	Lost by 5 points	Adelaide Oval (H)	53,117	13th	
10	Saturday, 17 May (3:45 pm)	Geelong	**5.9 (39)**	17.13 (115)	Lost by 76 points	Adelaide Oval (H)	35,508	15th	
11	Saturday, 24 May (6:10 pm)	Fremantle	15.10 (100)	**7.9 (51)**	Lost by 49 points	Optus Stadium (A)	40,466	15th	
12	Bye							15th	
13	Saturday, 7 June (7:35 pm)	Greater Western Sydney	7.8 (50)	**9.12 (66)**	Won by 16 points	Manuka Oval (A)	9,005	15th	
14	Sunday, 15 June (2:50 pm)	Melbourne	**14.9 (93)**	9.14 (68)	Won by 25 points	Adelaide Oval (H)	30,144	10th	
15	Saturday, 21 June (3:45 pm)	Sydney	**7.10 (52)**	9.17 (61)	Lost by 19 points	Adelaide Oval (H)	33,576	12th	
16	Thursday, 26 June (7:00 pm)	Carlton	**16.14 (110)**	8.12 (60)	Won by 50 points	Adelaide Oval (H)	30,381	10th	
17	Saturday, 5 July (7:35 pm)	Brisbane Lions	18.12 (120)	**14.8 (92)**	Lost by 28 points	The Gabba (A)	30,017	11th	
18	Sunday, 13 July (4:10 pm)	West Coast	**12.15 (87)**	9.7 (61)	Won by 26 points	Adelaide Oval (H)	30,553	11th	
19	Saturday, 19 July (1:20 pm)	Hawthorn	13.9 (87)	**7.7 (49)**	Lost by 38 points	UTAS Stadium (A)	12,772	11th	
20	Saturday, 26 July (7:40 pm)	Adelaide	20.13 (133)	**5.5 (35)**	Lost by 98 points	Adelaide Oval (A)	46,018	11th	
21	Sunday, 3 August (3:20 pm)	Geelong	23.15 (153)	**9.11 (65)**	Lost by 88 points	GMHBA Stadium (A)	28,064	11th	
22	Saturday, 9 August (7:40 pm)	Fremantle	**13.8 (86)**	13.14 (92)	Lost by 6 points	Adelaide Oval (H)	30,390	12th	
23	Saturday, 16 August (1:20 pm)	Carlton	18.10 (118)	**9.10 (64)**	Lost by 54 points	Marvel Stadium (A)	25,020	13th	
24	Friday, 22 August (7:40 pm)	Gold Coast	**10.11 (71)**	9.13 (67)	Won by 4 points	Adelaide Oval (H)	40,897	13th	

=== Ladder ===
Pos	Team	Pld	W	L	D	PF	PA	PP	Pts	Qualification
1	Adelaide	23	18	5	0	2278	1635	139.3	72	Finals series
2	Geelong	23	17	6	0	2425	1714	141.5	68	Finals series
3	Brisbane Lions (P)	23	16	6	1	2061	1804	114.2	66	Finals series
4	Collingwood	23	16	7	0	1991	1627	122.4	64	Finals series
5	Greater Western Sydney	23	16	7	0	2114	1834	115.3	64	Finals series
6	Fremantle	23	16	7	0	1978	1815	109.0	64	Finals series
7	Gold Coast	23	15	8	0	2173	1740	124.9	60	Finals series
8	Hawthorn	23	15	8	0	2045	1691	120.9	60	Finals series
9	Western Bulldogs	23	14	9	0	2493	1820	137.0	56	
10	Sydney	23	12	11	0	1845	1902	97.0	48	
11	Carlton	23	9	14	0	1799	1861	96.7	36	
12	St Kilda	23	9	14	0	1839	2077	88.5	36	
**13**	Port Adelaide	**23**	**9**	**14**	**0**	**1705**	**2136**	**79.8**	36	
14	Melbourne	23	7	16	0	1902	2038	93.3	28	
15	Essendon	23	6	17	0	1535	2209	69.5	24	
16	North Melbourne	23	5	17	1	1805	2365	76.3	22	
17	Richmond	23	5	18	0	1449	2197	66.0	20	
18	West Coast	23	1	22	0	1466	2438	60.1	4	

Source: afl.com.au
Rules for classification: 1) points; 2) percentage; 3) number of points for
(P) Premiers

== SANFL season ==
=== Pre-season ===
**Date and time**	**Opponent**	**Scores** (Port Adelaide's scores indicated in **bold**)			**Venue**	**Ref.**
**Date and time**	**Opponent**	Home	Away	Result	**Venue**	**Ref.**
Sunday, 16 March (2:20 pm)	Norwood	**6.9 (45)**	9.9 (63)	Lost by 18 points	Alberton Oval (H)	
Sunday, 23 March (11:30 am)	West Adelaide	**7.14 (56)**	8.12 (60)	Lost by 4 points	Alberton Oval (H)	

=== Regular season ===
**Rd**	**Date and time**	**Opponent**	**Scores** (Port Adelaide's scores indicated in **bold**)			**Venue**	**Attendance**	**Ladder**	**Ref.**
**Rd**	**Date and time**	**Opponent**	Home	Away	Result	**Venue**	**Attendance**	**Ladder**	**Ref.**
1	Friday, 28 March (7:10 pm)	Glenelg	**4.10 (34)**	14.14 (98)	Lost by 64 points	Alberton Oval (H)	2,009	9th	
2	Saturday, 5 April (2:10 pm)	Sturt	16.11 (107)	**12.6 (78)**	Lost by 29 points	Thomas Farms Oval (A)	2,293	9th	
3	Friday, 18 April (7:10 pm)	South Adelaide	**16.8 (104)**	12.11 (83)	Won by 21 points	Alberton Oval (H)	?	8th	
4	Friday, 25 April (1:40 pm)	Central District	17.8 (110)	**10.4 (64)**	Lost by 46 points	X Convenience Oval (A)	2,565	8th	
5	Saturday, 3 May (12:05 pm)	Woodville-West Torrens	12.5 (77)	**7.10 (53)**	Lost by 24 points	Maughan Thiem Kia Oval (A)	960	8th	
6	Saturday, 10 May (3:10 pm)	Adelaide	**5.13 (43)**	13.10 (88)	Lost by 45 points	Adelaide Oval (H)	N/A (Note: No attendance recorded as the match was a curtain raiser to the AFL game played afterwards.)	9th	
7	Saturday, 24 May (2:10 pm)	North Adelaide	**11.6 (72)**	10.10 (70)	Won by 2 points	Alberton Oval (H)	1,227	7th	
8	Bye							8th	
9	Sunday, 8 June (1:10 pm)	West Adelaide	**19.6 (120)**	9.3 (57)	Won by 63 points	Alberton Oval (H)	1,446	6th	
10	Saturday, 14 June (2:10 pm)	Woodville-West Torrens	**10.14 (74)**	8.11 (59)	Won by 15 points	Alberton Oval (H)	800	6th	
11	Saturday, 28 June (1:10 pm)	South Adelaide	9.11 (65)	**8.10 (58)**	Lost by 7 points	Magain Stadium (A)	956	6th	
12	Sunday, 6 July (1:10 pm)	Norwood	15.3 (93)	**12.4 (76)**	Lost by 17 points	Alberton Oval (H)	1,476	7th	
13	Saturday, 12 July (2:10 pm)	Sturt	**10.9 (69)**	22.11 (143)	Lost by 74 points	Alberton Oval (H)	1,830	7th	
14	Sunday, 20 July (1:10 pm)	North Adelaide	10.8 (68)	**15.10 (100)**	Won by 32 points	Prospect Oval (A)	2,263	7th	
15	Saturday, 26 July (4:10 pm)	Adelaide	12.22 (94)	**12.7 (79)**	Lost by 15 points	Adelaide Oval (A)	N/A	7th	
16	Saturday, 2 August (2:10 pm)	West Adelaide	9.14 (68)	**14.8 (92)**	Won by 24 points	Hisense Stadium (A)	879	5th	
17	Sunday, 10 August (2:10 pm)	Central District	**14.10 (94)**	12.8 (80)	Won by 14 points	Alberton Oval (H)	1,635	5th	
18	Saturday, 16 August (2:10 pm)	Glenelg	13.16 (94)	**12.12 (84)**	Lost by 6 points	Stratarama Stadium (A)	2,685	6th	
19	Saturday, 23 August (3:40 pm)	Norwood	12.15 (87)	**11.11 (77)**	Lost by 10 points	Coopers Stadium (A)	3,387	6th	

=== Ladder ===
Pos	Team	Pld	W	L	D	PF	PA	PP	Pts	Qualification
1	Sturt	18	17	1	0	1924	1089	63.86	34	Finals series
2	Glenelg	18	15	3	0	1818	1197	60.30	30	Finals series
3	Adelaide (R)	18	14	4	0	1717	1241	58.05	28	Finals series
4	Central District	18	11	7	0	1368	1288	51.51	22	Finals series
5	Norwood	18	8	10	0	1431	1286	52.67	16	Finals series
**6**	Port Adelaide (R)	**18**	**7**	**11**	**0**	**1370**	**1541**	**47.06**	14	
7	Woodville-West Torrens	18	7	11	0	1176	1626	41.97	14	
8	South Adelaide	18	4	14	0	1154	1455	44.23	8	
9	North Adelaide	18	4	14	0	1249	1723	42.03	8	
10	West Adelaide	18	3	15	0	1063	1824	36.82	6	

Updated to match(es) played on 3 August 2025. Source: sanfl.com.au
Rules for classification: 1) points; 2) percentage; 3) number of points for.

== AFLW season ==
=== Pre-season ===
**Date and time**	**Opponent**	**Scores** (Port Adelaide's scores indicated in **bold**)			**Venue**	**Ref.**
**Date and time**	**Opponent**	Home	Away	Result	**Venue**	**Ref.**
Saturday, 26 July (11:00 am)	Adelaide	**7.7 (49)**	6.11 (47)	Won by 2 points	Alberton Oval (H)	
Sunday, 3 August (1:30 pm)	Collingwood	**2.2 (14)**	3.12 (30)	Lost by 14 points	Alberton Oval (H)	

=== Regular season ===
**Rd**	**Date and time**	**Opponent**	**Scores** (Port Adelaide's scores indicated in **bold**)			**Venue**	**Attendance**	**Ladder**	**Ref.**
**Rd**	**Date and time**	**Opponent**	Home	Away	Result	**Venue**	**Attendance**	**Ladder**	**Ref.**
1	Sunday, 17 August (3:40 pm)	Fremantle	**3.6 (24)**	7.4 (46)	Lost by 22 points	Alberton Oval (H)	2,873	13th	
2	Sunday, 24 August (1:05 pm)	North Melbourne	13.9 (87)	**2.3 (15)**	Lost by 72 points	Arden Street Oval (A)	2,346	18th	
3	Saturday, 30 August (4:35 pm)	Gold Coast	**16.12 (108)**	5.10 (40)	Won by 68 points	Alberton Oval (H)	2,162	10th	
4	Sunday, 7 September (3:05 pm)	West Coast	10.4 (64)	**7.3 (45)**	Lost by 19 points	Mineral Resources Park (H)	1,597	10th	
5	Saturday, 13 September (2:35 pm)	Melbourne	**6.7 (43)**	5.11 (41)	Won by 2 points	Alberton Oval (H)	2,736	11th	
6	Saturday, 20 September (12:35 pm)	Geelong	**6.4 (40)**	6.9 (45)	Lost by 5 points	Alberton Oval (H)	2,255	13th	
7	Sunday, 28 September (1:05 pm)	St Kilda	8.5 (53)	**6.6 (42)**	Lost by 11 points	RSEA Park (A)	1,776	14th	
8	Saturday, 4 October (6:45 pm)	Western Bulldogs	**8.6 (54)**	5.5 (35)	Won by 19 points	Alberton Oval (H)	2,444	11th	
9	Saturday, 11 October (4:35 pm)	Brisbane	9.8 (62)	**4.9 (33)**	Lost by 29 points	Brighton Homes Arena (A)	2,685	13th	
10	Friday, 17 October (6:45 pm)	Hawthorn	**15.4 (94)**	8.11 (59)	Won by 35 points	Alberton Oval (H)	3,039	12th	
11	Friday, 24 October (7:05 pm)	Adelaide	6.9 (45)	**7.10 (52)**	Won by 7 points	Norwood Oval (A)	5,434	11th	
12	Saturday, 1 November (1:05 pm)	Greater Western Sydney	3.6 (24)	**11.15 (81)**	Won by 57 points	Henson Park (A)	1,172	10th	

=== Ladder ===
Pos	Team	Pld	W	L	D	PF	PA	PP	Pts	Qualification
1	North Melbourne (P)	12	12	0	0	868	270	321.5	48	Finals series
2	Melbourne	12	9	3	0	684	327	209.2	36	Finals series
3	Brisbane	12	9	3	0	652	403	161.8	36	Finals series
4	Hawthorn	12	9	3	0	451	433	104.2	36	Finals series
5	Carlton	12	8	4	0	554	474	116.9	32	Finals series
6	Adelaide	12	7	5	0	515	460	112.0	28	Finals series
7	St Kilda	12	7	5	0	392	407	96.3	28	Finals series
8	West Coast	12	6	6	0	472	423	111.6	24	Finals series
9	Sydney	12	6	6	0	542	504	107.5	24	
**10**	Port Adelaide	**12**	**6**	**6**	**0**	**631**	**601**	**105.0**	24	
11	Fremantle	12	6	6	0	414	512	80.9	24	
12	Western Bulldogs	12	5	7	0	415	358	115.9	20	
13	Geelong	12	5	7	0	500	539	92.8	20	
14	Essendon	12	4	8	0	331	552	60.0	16	
15	Collingwood	12	3	9	0	314	505	62.2	12	
16	Richmond	12	2	10	0	349	583	59.9	8	
17	Greater Western Sydney	12	2	10	0	401	681	58.9	8	
18	Gold Coast	12	2	10	0	319	772	41.3	8	

Source: afl.com.au
Rules for classification: 1) points; 2) percentage; 3) number of points for
(P) Premiers

== Awards ==
=== Power (AFL) ===
- John Cahill Medal – Zak Butters
- Runner Up – Mitch Georgiades
- Bruce Weber Memorial Award – Connor Rozee
- Fos Williams Medal – Willem Drew
- Leading goalkicker – Mitch Georgiades (58 goals)
- Gavin Wanganeen Award – Christian Moraes
- Coaches’ Award – Esava Ratugolea
- John McCarthy Award – Willie Rioli

=== Magpies (SANFL) ===
- A.R. McLean Medal – Jack Watkins
- Max Porter Memorial Trophy – Jez McLennan
- A. Williams Memorial Trophy – Jake Weidemann
- Leading goalkicker – Dylan Williams & Jeremy Finlayson (21 goals)
- Bob Clayton Award – Dianne ‘Midge’ O’Malley

=== Power (AFLW) ===
- Best and Fairest Medal – Matilda Scholz
- Runner-Up Medal – Ashleigh Woodland
- Third Place Medal – Indy Tahau
- Best First Year Player – Jasmine Sowden
- Coaches Most Improved – Sachi Syme
- Players’ Player – Ella Boag
- Leading goalkicker – Indy Tahau
