= 2024 Port Adelaide Football Club season =

Port Adelaide Football Club
2024 season
- President: David Koch
- Coach: Ken Hinkley (AFL); Lauren Arnell (AFLW); Hamish Hartlett (SANFL)
- Captains: Connor Rozee (AFL); Janelle Cuthbertson (AFLW); Nick Moore (SANFL)
- Home ground: Adelaide Oval (AFL); Alberton Oval (AFLW); Alberton Oval (SANFL)
- Regular season: 2nd (AFL); 6th (AFLW); 10th (SANFL)
- Finals series: Preliminary Final (AFL); Preliminary Final (AFLW); DNQ (SANFL)

The 2024 Port Adelaide Football Club season was the club's 28th season in the Australian Football League (AFL) and the 154th year since its inception in 1870. The club also fielded its reserves men's team in the South Australian National Football League (SANFL) and its women's team in the AFL Women's (AFLW), in which they qualified for their first finals series and reached the preliminary final.

== Squads ==
=== AFL ===
2024 Port Adelaide Football Club AFL squad
Senior list		Rookie list	Coaching staff
1 Connor Rozee (c); 2 Sam Powell-Pepper; 3 Ryan Burton; 4 Todd Marshall; 5 Dan Houston; 6 Kane Farrell; 7 Jase Burgoyne; 8 Josh Sinn; 9 Zak Butters (vc); 10 Travis Boak; 11 Jeremy Finlayson; 12 Trent McKenzie; 13 Ivan Soldo; 14 Miles Bergman; 15 Willie Rioli; 16 Ollie Wines; 17 Tom Clurey; 18 Jason Horne-Francis; 19 Mitch Georgiades	21 Aliir Aliir; 22 Charlie Dixon; 24 Jordon Sweet; 25 Brandon Zerk-Thatcher; 26 Lachlan Charleson; 27 Esava Ratugolea; 28 Willem Drew; 29 Thomas Anastasopoulos; 30 Ollie Lord; 31 Francis Evans; 32 Thomas Scully; 33 Darcy Byrne-Jones; 34 Lachie Jones; 36 Will Lorenz; 37 Tom McCallum; 38 Dante Visentini; 39 Hugh Jackson; 40 Kyle Marshall; 44 Jackson Mead	23 Dylan Williams; 41 Jed McEntee; 42 Quinton Narkle; 45 Xavier Walsh	Head coach: Ken Hinkley; Assistant coach: Josh Carr (midfield); Chad Cornes (forwards); Matthew Lobbe (rucks); Tyson Goldsack (SANFL coach); Luke Kelly (midfield development); Hamish Hartlett (defence development); Legend: (c) Captain(s); (vc) Vice-captain(s); (B) Category B rookie; italics - Inactive player list; Long-term injury; (ret.) Retired; Updated: 1 March 2026; Source(s): Port Adelaide AFL

=== SANFL ===
2024 Port Adelaide Football Club SANFL squad
SANFL list (Note: Port Adelaide AFL-listed players (not selected to play AFL) are allowed to play for the SANFL squad.)		Coaching Staff
1 Nick Moore (c); Dylan Aldridge; Beau Baldwin; Tyson Brazel; Josh Byrne; Miller Carter; Bailey Chamberlain; Oliver Cheesman; Preston Cockatoo-Collins; Nathaniel Cooper; Logan Evans; Hugh Ferrari	Will Ferrari; Cody Gilchrist; Dustin Launer; Lachlan Pascoe; Kye Roberts; Murphy Short; Reed Stevens; Cody Szust; Aidan Turner; Jake Weidemann; Harry Williams	Head coach: Hamish Hartlett; Assistant coach: Cameron Sutcliffe; Legend: (c) Captain(s); (vc) Vice-captain(s); Updated: 1 March 2024; Source(s):

=== AFLW ===
2024 Port Adelaide Football Club AFLW squad
Senior list		Coaching staff
1 Janelle Cuthbertson (c); 2 Ebony O'Dea; 3 Ange Foley (vc); 4 Piper Window; 5 Abbey Dowrick; 6 Molly Brooksby; 8 Ashleigh Saint; 9 Maria Moloney; 10 Indy Tahau; 11 Caitlyn Wendland; 12 Hannah Ewings; 13 Jasmin Stewart; 14 Justine Mules; 15 Julia Teakle; 16 Shineah Goody; 17 Ella Boag; 18 Olivia Levicki; 19 Alex Ballard	20 Sachi Syme; 21 Amelie Borg; 22 Lauren Young (i); 23 Alissa Brook; 24 Hannah Dunn (i); 26 Madeline Keryk; 27 Gemma Houghton; 28 Cheyenne Hammond; 29 Matilda Scholz; 30 Teagan Germech; 32 Jasmine Simmons; 35 Kirsty Lamb; 43 Georgie Jaques; 44 Katelyn Pope	Head coach: Lauren Arnell; Assistant coaches: Daniel Caire (assistant coach); Sam Virgo (assistant coach); Cam Sutcliffe (assistant coach); Dave Reynolds (development coach); Braedon Talbot (development coach); Legend: (c) Captain(s); (vc) Vice-captain(s); (i) Inactive player; Updated: 1 March 2026; Source(s): Port Adelaide AFLW

== AFL season ==
=== Pre-season ===
**Date and time**	**Opponent**	**Scores** (Port Adelaide's scores indicated in **bold**)			**Venue**	**Ref.**
**Date and time**	**Opponent**	Home	Away	Result	**Venue**	**Ref.**
Friday, 23 February (5:00 pm)	Adelaide	**21.12 (138)**	17.14 (116)	Won by 22 points	Alberton Oval	
Friday, 1 March (7:30 pm)	Fremantle	**13.14 (92)**	8.5 (53)	Won by 39 points	Alberton Oval	

=== Regular season ===
**Rd**	**Date and time**	**Opponent**	**Scores** (Port Adelaide's scores indicated in **bold**)			**Venue**	**Attendance**	**Ladder**	**Ref.**
**Rd**	**Date and time**	**Opponent**	Home	Away	Result	**Venue**	**Attendance**	**Ladder**	**Ref.**
1	Sunday, 17 March (3:30 pm)	West Coast	**16.24 (120)**	10.10 (70)	Won by 50 points	Adelaide Oval (H)	33,230	5th	
2	Sunday, 24 March (4:00 pm)	Richmond	13.14 (92)	**18.14 (122)**	Won by 30 points	Melbourne Cricket Ground (A)	30,254	3rd	
3	Saturday, 30 March (7:00 pm)	Melbourne	**13.11 (89)**	15.6 (96)	Lost by 7 points	Adelaide Oval (H)	38,105	8th	
4	Friday, 5 April (7:40 pm)	Essendon	**17.9 (111)**	6.6 (42)	Won by 69 points	Adelaide Oval (N)	47,641	6th	
5	Saturday, 13 April (8:00 pm)	Fremantle	**9.12 (66)**	9.9 (63)	Won by 3 points	Adelaide Oval (H)	35,658	3rd	
6	Saturday, 20 April (2:45 pm)	Collingwood	17.21 (123)	**12.9 (81)**	Lost by 42 points	Melbourne Cricket Ground (A)	65,834	5th	
7	Friday, 26 April (8:10 pm)	St Kilda	**11.16 (82)**	11.6 (72)	Won by 10 points	Adelaide Oval (H)	40,306	5th	
8	Thursday, 2 May (8:00 pm)	Adelaide	12.6 (78)	5.18 (48)	Lost by 30 points	Adelaide Oval (A)	52,106	7th	
9	Friday, 10 May (8:10 pm)	Geelong	14.11 (95)	**15.11 (101)**	Won by 6 points	GMHBA Stadium (A)	29,942	6th	
10	Sunday, 19 May (3:40 pm)	Hawthorn	**11.14 (80)**	12.7 (79)	Won by 1 point	Adelaide Oval (H)	36,190	4th	
11	Saturday, 25 May (2:45 pm)	North Melbourne	7.6 (48)	**16.11 (107)**	Won by 59 points	Blundstone Arena (A)	4,705	3rd	
12	Thursday, 30 May (8:00 pm)	Carlton	**10.11 (71)**	16.11 (107)	Lost by 36 points	Adelaide Oval (H)	40,532	4th	
13	Bye								
14	Sunday, 16 June (4:00 pm)	Greater Western Sydney	9.19 (73)	**6.15 (51)**	Lost by 22 points	Engie Stadium (A)	8,914	7th	
15	Saturday, 22 June (1:15 pm)	Brisbane Lions	**10.13 (73)**	23.14 (152)	Lost by 79 points	Adelaide Oval (H)	32,862	8th	
16	Sunday, 30 June (1:10 pm)	St Kilda	8.12 (60)	**8.14 (62)**	Won by 2 points	Marvel Stadium (A)	18,052	7th	
17	Saturday, 6 July (1:15 pm)	Western Bulldogs	**15.12 (102)**	8.6 (54)	Won by 48 points	Adelaide Oval (H)	31,590	6th	
18	Sunday, 14 July (1:10 pm)	Gold Coast	14.12 (96)	**12.10 (82)**	Lost by 14 points	People First Stadium (A)	14,526	9th	
19	Saturday, 20 July (7:00 pm)	Richmond	**16.20 (116)**	11.9 (75)	Won by 41 points	Adelaide Oval (H)	27,704	7th	
20	Friday, 26 July (7:40 pm)	Carlton	9.11 (65)	**11.13 (79)**	Won by 14 points	Marvel Stadium (A)	40,500	7th	
21	Saturday, 3 August (7:00 pm)	Sydney	**22.16 (148)**	5.6 (36)	Won by 112 points	Adelaide Oval (H)	37,501	3rd	
22	Saturday, 10 August (7:30 pm)	Melbourne	7.9 (51)	**7.11 (53)**	Won by 2 points	MCG (A)	17,867	2nd	
23	Saturday, 17 August (7:00 pm)	Adelaide	**11.14 (80)**	8.10 (58)	Won by 22 points	Adelaide Oval (H)	52,459	2nd	
24	Sunday, 25 August (4:10 pm)	Fremantle	9.13 (67)	**13.9 (87)**	Won by 20 points	Optus Stadium (A)	45,322	2nd	

=== Finals series ===
**Round**	**Date and time**	**Opponent**	**Scores** (Port Adelaide's scores indicated in **bold**)			**Venue**	**Attendance**	**Ref.**
**Round**	**Date and time**	**Opponent**	Home	Away	Result	**Venue**	**Attendance**	**Ref.**
Second Qualifying Final	Thursday, 5 September (7:10 pm)	Geelong	**7.12 (54)**	20.18 (138)	Lost by 84 points	Adelaide Oval (H)	50,342	
Second Semi Final	Friday, 13 September (7:10 pm)	Hawthorn	**11.9 (75)**	11.6 (72)	Won by 3 points	Adelaide Oval (H)	51,012	
First Preliminary Final	Friday, 20 September (7:40 pm)	Sydney	14.11 (95)	**8.11 (59)**	Lost by 36 points	Sydney Cricket Ground (A)	44,053	
Port Adelaide was eliminated from the 2024 AFL finals series

=== Ladder ===
Pos	Team	Pld	W	L	D	PF	PA	PP	Pts	Qualification
1	Sydney	23	17	6	0	2242	1769	126.7	68	Finals series
**2**	Port Adelaide	**23**	**16**	**7**	**0**	**2011**	**1752**	**114.8**	64	Finals series
3	Geelong	23	15	8	0	2164	1928	112.2	60	Finals series
4	Greater Western Sydney	23	15	8	0	2034	1864	109.1	60	Finals series
5	Brisbane Lions (P)	23	14	8	1	2130	1747	121.9	58	Finals series
6	Western Bulldogs	23	14	9	0	2171	1736	125.1	56	Finals series
7	Hawthorn	23	14	9	0	2090	1763	118.5	56	Finals series
8	Carlton	23	13	10	0	2151	1952	110.2	52	Finals series
9	Collingwood	23	12	9	2	1991	1943	102.5	52	
10	Fremantle	23	12	10	1	1964	1755	111.9	50	
11	Essendon	23	11	11	1	1892	2024	93.5	46	
12	St Kilda	23	11	12	0	1748	1758	99.4	44	
13	Gold Coast	23	11	12	0	1925	1943	99.1	44	
14	Melbourne	23	11	12	0	1785	1812	98.5	44	
15	Adelaide	23	8	14	1	1906	1923	99.1	34	
16	West Coast	23	5	18	0	1594	2339	68.1	20	
17	North Melbourne	23	3	20	0	1619	2550	63.5	12	
18	Richmond	23	2	21	0	1505	2364	63.7	8	

Source: afl.com.au
Rules for classification: 1) points; 2) percentage; 3) number of points for
(P) Premiers

== SANFL season ==
=== Pre-season ===
**Date and time**	**Opponent**	**Scores** (Port Adelaide's scores indicated in **bold**)			**Venue**	**Ref.**
**Date and time**	**Opponent**	Home	Away	Result	**Venue**	**Ref.**
Saturday, 16 March (3:20 pm)	North Adelaide	13.9 (87)	**13.8 (86)**	Lost by 1 point	Thebarton Oval (A)	
Friday, 22 March (6:15 pm)	South Adelaide	**13.20 (98)**	7.7 (49)	Won by 49 points	Alberton Oval (H)	

=== Regular season ===
**Rd**	**Date and time**	**Opponent**	**Scores** (Port Adelaide's scores indicated in **bold**)			**Venue**	**Attendance**	**Ladder**	**Ref.**
**Rd**	**Date and time**	**Opponent**	Home	Away	Result	**Venue**	**Attendance**	**Ladder**	**Ref.**
1	Friday, 29 March (4:40 pm)	Glenelg	23.12 (150)	**13.6 (84)**	Lost by 66 points	Glenelg Oval (A)	5,007	8th	
2	Sunday, 14 April (2:10 pm)	West Adelaide	12.11 (83)	**11.13 (79)**	Lost by 4 points	Waikerie Oval (A)	1,736	7th	
3	Sunday, 21 April (2:10 pm)	Woodville-West Torrens	12.11 (83)	**8.9 (57)**	Lost by 26 points	Woodville Oval (A)	?	8th	
4	Saturday, 27 April (7:10 pm)	Norwood	**6.7 (43)**	8.13 (61)	Lost by 18 points	Alberton Oval (H)	1,894	8th	
5	Thursday, 2 May (3:20 pm)	Adelaide	16.7 (103)	**8.14 (62)**	Lost by 41 points	Adelaide Oval (A)	N/A (Note: No attendance recorded as the match was a curtain raiser to the AFL game played afterwards.)	8th	
6	Saturday, 11 May (2:10 pm)	North Adelaide	**5.5 (35)**	18.11 (119)	Lost by 84 points	Alberton Oval (H)	1,535	9th	
7	Saturday, 25 May (2:10 pm)	South Adelaide	17.15 (117)	**7.2 (44)**	Lost by 73 points	Noarlunga Oval (A)	1,009	9th	
8	Friday, 31 May (7:10 pm)	Sturt	**4.3 (27)**	6.15 (51)	Lost by 24 points	Alberton Oval (H)	?	9th	
9	Bye								
10	Saturday, 15 June (2:10 pm)	West Adelaide	**15.7 (97)**	10.17 (77)	Won by 20 points	Alberton Oval (H)	1,290	9th	
11	Sunday, 23 June (2:10 pm)	Norwood	18.14 (122)	**5.9 (39)**	Lost by 83 points	Norwood Oval (A)	2,652	9th	
12	Saturday, 29 June (2:10 pm)	Central Districts	**7.11 (53)**	12.6 (78)	Lost by 25 points	Alberton Oval (H)	966	9th	
13	Sunday, 7 July (2:30 pm)	North Adelaide	8.9 (57)	**13.8 (86)**	Won by 29 points	Prospect Oval (A)	2,381	9th	
14	Saturday, 13 July (2:10 pm)	Glenelg	**9.7 (61)**	6.11 (47)	Won by 14 points	Alberton Oval (H)	1,178	9th	
15	Sunday, 21 July (2:10 pm)	South Adelaide	**12.8 (80)**	14.11 (95)	Lost by 15 points	Alberton Oval (H)	970	10th	
16	Saturday, 27 July (2:10 pm)	Sturt	9.14 (68)	**6.9 (45)**	Lost by 23 points	Thomas Farms Oval (A)	2,244	10th	
17	Sunday, 11 August (2:10 pm)	Woodville-West Torrens	**15.13 (103)**	8.11 (59)	Won by 44 points	Alberton Oval (H)	1,480	10th	
18	Saturday, 17 Aug (3:20 pm)	Adelaide	**6.11 (47)**	19.10 (124)	Lost by 77 points	Adelaide Oval (H)	N/A	10th	
19	Saturday, 24 August (2:10 pm)	Central Districts	**15.14 (104)**	5.6 (36)	Lost by 68 points	X Convenience Oval (A)	2,508	10th	

=== Ladder ===
Pos	Team	Pld	W	L	D	PF	PA	PP	Pts	Qualification
1	Norwood	18	15	3	0	1491	948	61.13	30	Finals series
2	Sturt	18	15	3	0	1340	896	59.93	30	Finals series
3	Central District	18	12	6	0	1267	1146	52.51	24	Finals series
4	Glenelg (P)	18	11	7	0	1426	1186	54.59	22	Finals series
5	Woodville-West Torrens	18	8	10	0	1383	1288	51.78	16	Finals series
6	Adelaide (R)	18	8	10	0	1290	1315	49.52	16	
7	North Adelaide	18	8	10	0	1306	1402	48.23	16	
8	West Adelaide	18	5	13	0	1109	1433	43.63	10	
9	South Adelaide	18	4	14	0	1080	1558	40.94	8	
**10**	Port Adelaide (R)	**18**	**4**	**14**	**0**	**1078**	**1598**	**40.28**	8	

Updated to match(es) played on 24 August 2024. Source: sanfl.com.au
Rules for classification: 1) points; 2) percentage; 3) number of points for.
(P) Premiers

== AFLW season ==
=== Pre-season ===
**Date and time**	**Opponent**	**Scores** (Port Adelaide's scores indicated in **bold**)			**Venue**	**Ref.**
**Date and time**	**Opponent**	Home	Away	Result	**Venue**	**Ref.**
Sunday, 11 August (12:00 pm)	Adelaide	**5.4 (34)**	8.10 (58)	Lost by 24 points	Central Oval (H)	
Sunday, 18 August (11:00 am)	Melbourne	**9.8 (62)**	8.4 (52)	Won by 10 points	Alberton Oval (H)	

=== Regular season ===
**Rd**	**Date and time**	**Opponent**	**Scores** (Port Adelaide's scores indicated in **bold**)			**Venue**	**Attendance**	**Ladder**	**Ref.**
**Rd**	**Date and time**	**Opponent**	Home	Away	Result	**Venue**	**Attendance**	**Ladder**	**Ref.**
1	Saturday, 31 August (7:15 pm)	Adelaide	**5.5 (35)**	7.7 (49)	Lost by 14 points	Alberton Oval (H)	5,194	12th	
2	Friday, 6 September (5:05 pm)	Western Bulldogs	0.6 (6)	**7.4 (46)**	Won by 40 points	Melbourne Cricket Ground (A)	23,085 (Note: This was the recorded attendance for the match, which was held as a curtain raiser to an AFL elimination final.)	6th	
3	Saturday, 14 September (4:05 pm)	Fremantle	**4.5 (29)**	5.7 (37)	Lost by 8 points	Alberton Oval (H)	2,016	11th	
4	Friday, 20 September (5:05 pm)	North Melbourne	6.6 (42)	**1.0 (6)**	Lost by 36 points	Whitten Oval (A)	943	13th	
5	Tuesday, 24 September (7:15 pm)	Richmond	6.12 (48)	**3.9 (27)**	Lost by 21 points	Ikon Park (A)	1,493	15th	
6	Sunday, 29 September (4:35 pm)	Carlton	**8.10 (58)**	3.5 (23)	Won by 25 points	Alberton Oval (H)	1,706	10th	
7	Saturday, 5 October (3:05 pm)	West Coast	5.6 (36)	**7.7 (49)**	Won by 13 points	Mineral Resources Park (A)	2,470	9th	
8	Thursday, 10 October (7:15 pm)	Collingwood	**4.9 (33)**	3.7 (25)	Won by 8 points	Alberton Oval (H)	2,526	9th	
9	Friday, 18 October (7:15 pm)	St Kilda	**7.5 (47)**	5.2 (32)	Won by 15 points	Alberton Oval (H)	2,486	7th	
10	Saturday, 26 October (4:05 pm)	Gold Coast	3.6 (24)	**8.10 (58)**	Won by 34 points	People First Stadium (A)	2,160	7th	
11	Sunday, 3 November (4:35 pm)	Greater Western Sydney	**7.1 (43)**	6.6 (42)	Won by 1 point	Alberton Oval (H)	4,148	6th	

=== Finals series ===
**Round**	**Date and time**	**Opponent**	**Scores** (Port Adelaide's scores indicated in **bold**)			**Venue**	**Attendance**	**Ref.**
**Round**	**Date and time**	**Opponent**	Home	Away	Result	**Venue**	**Attendance**	**Ref.**
Second Elimination Final	Sunday, 10 November (2:35 pm)	Richmond	**11.6 (72)**	7.6 (48)	Won by 24 points	Alberton Oval (H)	5,172	
Second Semi Final	Saturday, 16 November (7:30 pm)	Hawthorn	6.13 (49)	**7.8 (50)**	Won by 1 point	Ikon Park (A)	3,680	
First Preliminary Final	Saturday, 23 November (3:05 pm)	North Melbourne	12.6 (78)	**2.9 (21)**	Lost by 57 points	Ikon Park (A)	4,387	
Port Adelaide was eliminated from the 2024 AFLW finals series

=== Ladder ===
Pos	Team	Pld	W	L	D	PF	PA	PP	Pts	Qualification
1	North Melbourne (P)	11	10	0	1	656	208	315.4	42	Finals series
2	Hawthorn	11	10	1	0	597	309	193.2	40	Finals series
3	Brisbane	11	9	2	0	611	335	182.4	36	Finals series
4	Adelaide	11	8	3	0	494	285	173.3	32	Finals series
5	Fremantle	11	8	3	0	404	297	136.0	32	Finals series
**6**	Port Adelaide	**11**	**7**	**4**	**0**	**431**	**364**	**118.4**	28	Finals series
7	Richmond	11	6	4	1	442	337	131.2	26	Finals series
8	Essendon	11	6	4	1	376	359	104.7	26	Finals series
9	Melbourne	11	6	5	0	369	420	87.9	24	
10	Geelong	11	4	6	1	479	437	109.6	18	
11	St Kilda	11	4	7	0	379	396	95.7	16	
12	Western Bulldogs	11	4	7	0	291	461	63.1	16	
13	West Coast	11	4	7	0	320	509	62.9	16	
14	Carlton	11	4	7	0	266	532	50.0	16	
15	Sydney	11	3	8	0	395	538	73.4	12	
16	Greater Western Sydney	11	1	9	1	374	531	70.4	6	
17	Gold Coast	11	1	9	1	311	569	54.7	6	
18	Collingwood	11	1	10	0	245	553	44.3	4	

Source: afl.com.au
Rules for classification: 1) points; 2) percentage; 3) number of points for
(P) Premiers

== Awards ==
=== Power (AFL) ===
- John Cahill Medal – Zak Butters
- Runner Up – Jason Horne-Francis
- Bruce Weber Medal – Aliir Aliir
- Fos Williams Medal – Willem Drew
- Gavin Wanganeen Award – Jason Horne-Francis
- Coaches’ Award – Jase Burgoyne
- John McCarthy Award – Dante Visentini

=== Magpies (SANFL) ===
- A.R. McLean Medal – Tom Clurey
- Max Porter Memorial Trophy – Will Lorenz
- A. Williams Memorial Trophy – Jake Weidemann
- Leading goalkicker – Thomas Scully
- Bob Clayton Award – Chris Glacken

=== Power (AFLW) ===
- Best and Fairest Medal – Matilda Scholz
- Runner-Up Medal – Abbey Dowrick
- Third Place Medal – Ashleigh Woodland
- Best First Year Player – Shineah Goody
- Coaches Most Improved – Amelie Borg
- Players’ Player – Amelie Borg
