= 2022 Port Adelaide Football Club season =

Port Adelaide Football Club
2022 season
- President: David Koch
- Coach: Ken Hinkley (AFL); Lauren Arnell (AFLW); Matthew Lokan (SANFL)
- Captains: Tom Jonas (AFL); Erin Phillips (AFLW); Cameron Sutcliffe (SANFL)
- Home ground: Adelaide Oval (AFL); Alberton Oval (AFLW); Alberton Oval (SANFL)
- Regular season: 11th (AFL); 17th (AFLW); 8th (SANFL)
- Finals series: DNQ (AFL); DNQ (AFLW); DNQ (SANFL)
- Best and Fairest: Connor Rozee (AFL); Hannah Ewings (AFLW); Cameron Sutcliffe (SANFL)

The 2022 Port Adelaide Football Club season was the club's 26th season in the Australian Football League (AFL) and the 152nd year since its inception in 1870. The club also fielded its reserves men's team in the South Australian National Football League (SANFL) and its inaugural women's team in the AFL Women's (AFLW).

== Squads ==
=== AFL ===
2022 Port Adelaide Football Club AFL squad
Senior list		Rookie list	Coaching staff
1 Tom Jonas (c); 2 Sam Powell-Pepper; 3 Ryan Burton; 4 Todd Marshall; 5 Dan Houston; 6 Steven Motlop; 7 Xavier Duursma; 8 Josh Sinn; 9 Robbie Gray; 10 Travis Boak; 11 Jeremy Finlayson; 12 Trent McKenzie; 13 Orazio Fantasia; 14 Miles Bergman; 15 Karl Amon; 16 Ollie Wines (vc); 17 Tom Clurey; 18 Zak Butters; 19 Mitch Georgiades	20 Connor Rozee; 21 Aliir Aliir; 22 Charlie Dixon; 23 Dylan Williams; 24 Kane Farrell; 25 Sam Hayes; 26 Riley Bonner; 28 Willem Drew; 29 Scott Lycett; 30 Ollie Lord; 31 Sam Skinner; 33 Darcy Byrne-Jones; 34 Lachie Jones; 36 Jase Burgoyne; 38 Dante Visentini; 39 Hugh Jackson; 44 Jackson Mead; 45 Martin Frederick	32 Sam Mayes; 37 Taj Schofield; 41 Jed McEntee; 43 Trent Dumont; 48 Jake Pasini	Head coach: Ken Hinkley; Assistant coaches: Nathan Bassett (forwards); Chad Cornes (defence); Matthew Lobbe (rucks); Matthew Lokan (SANFL coach & forwards development); Luke Kelly (midfield development); Tyson Goldsack (defence development); Legend: (c) Captain(s); (vc) Vice-captain(s); (B) Category B rookie; italics - Inactive player list; Long-term injury; (ret.) Retired; Updated: 1 March 2026; Source(s):

=== SANFL ===
2022 Port Adelaide Football Club SANFL squad
SANFL list (Note: Port Adelaide AFL-listed players (not selected to play AFL) are allowed to play for the SANFL squad.)		Coaching Staff
Cameron Sutcliffe; Matthew Appleton; Dylan Aldridge; John Butcher; Miller Carter; Oliver Cheeseman; Tom Corcoran; Brayden Kirk; Jackson Lee; Ethan Moore	Nick Moore; Owen Montgomery; Mac Nield; Sean Samblich; Aryan Sareen; Callum Saunders; Jack Strange; Luke Surman; Jake Westbrook; Campbell Wildman; Jake Weidemann	Head coach: Matthew Lokan; Assistant coaches: Luke Kelly; Tyson Goldsack; Legend: (c) Captain(s); (vc) Vice-captain(s); Updated: 18 November 2021; Source(s):

=== AFLW ===
2022 Port Adelaide Football Club AFLW squad
Senior list		Rookie list	Coaching staff
Alex Ballard; Laquoiya Cockatoo-Motlap; Litonya Cockatoo-Motlap; Jade de Melo; Tessa Doumanis; Abbey Dowrick; Hannah Dunn; Ange Foley; Jade Halfpenny; Cheyenne Hammond; Gemma Houghton; Maggie MacLachlan; Liz McGrath; Maria Moloney; Justine Mules	Ebony O'Dea; Brittany Perry; Erin Phillips; Kate Surman; Indy Tahau; Julia Teakle; Jacqui Yorston; Hannah Ewings; Sarah Goodwin; Sachi Syme; Ella Boag; Yasmin Duursma; Ameile Borg; Lily Johnson	Olivia Levicki	Head coach: Lauren Arnell; Assistant coaches: Daniel Caire (assistant coach); Hamish Hartlett (assistant coach); Dave Reynolds (assistant coach); Renee Forth (development coach); Clayton Lamb (development coach); Cam Sutcliffe (development coach); Legend: (c) Captain(s); (vc) Vice-captain(s); Updated: 4 July 2022; Source(s): Port Adelaide AFLW

== AFL season ==
=== Pre-season ===
**Date and time**	**Opponent**	**Scores** (Port Adelaide's scores indicated in **bold**)			**Venue**	**Attendance**	**Ref.**
**Date and time**	**Opponent**	Home	Away	Result	**Venue**	**Attendance**	**Ref.**
Friday, 25 February (2:00 pm)	Gold Coast	11.10 (76)	**6.19 (55)**	Lost by 21 points	Metricon Stadium	0 (BCD)	
Saturday, 5 March (3:40 pm)	Adelaide	11.8 (74)	**17.9 (111)**	Won by 35 points	Richmond Oval	7,265	

=== Regular season ===
**Rd**	**Date and time**	**Opponent**	**Scores** (Port Adelaide's scores indicated in **bold**)			**Venue**	**Attendance**	**Ladder**	**Ref.**
**Rd**	**Date and time**	**Opponent**	Home	Away	Result	**Venue**	**Attendance**	**Ladder**	**Ref.**
1	Saturday, 19 March (7:40 pm)	Brisbane Lions	12.9 (80)	**10.9 (69)**	Lost by 11 points	The Gabba (A)	25,100	11th	
2	Saturday, 26 March (7:10 pm)	Hawthorn	**7.14 (56)**	19.6 (120)	Lost by 64 points	Adelaide Oval (H)	30,267	18th	
3	Friday, 1 April (7:50 pm)	Adelaide	15.6 (96)	**13.14 (92)**	Lost by 4 points	Adelaide Oval (A)	39,190	16th	
4	Thursday, 7 April (7:10 pm)	Melbourne	**4.12 (36)**	10.8 (68)	Lost by 32 points	Adelaide Oval (H)	23,058	18th	
5	Sunday, 17 April (1:40 pm)	Carlton	14.10 (94)	**13.13 (91)**	Lost by 3 points	Melbourne Cricket Ground (A)	33,433	18th	
6	Saturday, 23 April (4:05 pm)	West Coast	**18.9 (117)**	4.9 (33)	Won by 84 points	Adelaide Oval (H)	28,587	14th	
7	Saturday, 30 April (7:25 pm)	St Kilda	4.18 (32)	**5.13 (43)**	Won by 1 point	Cazalys Stadium (A)	6,645	13th	
8	Friday, 6 May (7:00 pm)	Western Bulldogs	**12.14 (86)**	10.9 (69)	Won by 17 points	Adelaide Oval (H)	29,290	11th	
9	Saturday, 14 May (2:10 pm)	North Melbourne	6.10 (46)	**17.13 (115)**	Won by 69 points	Blundstone Arena (A)	5,114	10th	
10	Saturday, 21 May (1:45 pm)	Geelong	11.16 (82)	**7.5 (47)**	Lost by 35 points	GMHBA Stadium (A)	18,721	11th	
11	Sunday, 29 May (4:10 pm)	Essendon	**9.12 (66)**	6.14 (50)	Won by 16 points	Adelaide Oval (H)	25,877	11th	
12	Bye							12th	
13	Thursday, 9 June (7:20 pm)	Richmond	11.11 (77)	**10.5 (65)**	Lost by 12 points	Melbourne Cricket Ground (A)	21,757	12th	
14	Saturday, 18 June (1:15 pm)	Sydney	**12.10 (82)**	8.11 (59)	Won by 23 points	Adelaide Oval (H)	30,455	12th	
15	Sunday, 26 June (3:40 pm)	Gold Coast	**13.15 (93)**	13.13 (91)	Won by 2 points	Adelaide Oval (H)	26,241	12th	
16	Sunday, 3 July (3:20 pm)	Fremantle	15.9 (99)	**14.7 (91)**	Lost by 8 points	Optus Stadium (A)	41,326	12th	
17	Saturday, 9 July (7:00 pm)	Greater Western Sydney	**12.12 (84)**	3.11 (29)	Won by 55 points	Adelaide Oval (H)	24,744	12th	
18	Sunday, 17 July (2:50 pm)	Melbourne	12.11 (83)	**10.9 (69)**	Lost by 14 points	Traeger Park (A)	6,312	11th	
19	Saturday, 23 July (4:05 pm)	Geelong	**14.10 (94)**	16.10 (106)	Lost by 12 points	Adelaide Oval (H)	30,937	11th	
20	Saturday, 30 July (1:45 pm)	Collingwood	13.10 (88)	**12.10 (82)**	Lost by 6 points	Melbourne Cricket Ground (A)	40,716	12th	
21	Saturday, 6 August (7:10 pm)	Richmond	**10.11 (71)**	16.13 (109)	Lost by 38 points	Adelaide Oval (H)	27,051	12th	
22	Sunday, 14 August (4:40 pm)	Essendon	9.8 (62)	**23.8 (146)**	Won by 84 points	Marvel Stadium (A)	20,568	11th	
23	Saturday, 20 August (2:10 pm)	Adelaide	**16.15 (111)**	7.13 (55)	Won by 56 points	Adelaide Oval (H)	50,090	11th	

=== Ladder ===
Pos	Team	Pld	W	L	D	PF	PA	PP	Pts	Qualification
1	Geelong (P)	22	18	4	0	2146	1488	144.2	72	Finals series
2	Melbourne	22	16	6	0	1936	1483	130.5	64	Finals series
3	Sydney	22	16	6	0	2067	1616	127.9	64	Finals series
4	Collingwood	22	16	6	0	1839	1763	104.3	64	Finals series
5	Fremantle	22	15	6	1	1739	1486	117.0	62	Finals series
6	Brisbane Lions	22	15	7	0	2147	1799	119.3	60	Finals series
7	Richmond	22	13	8	1	2165	1780	121.6	54	Finals series
8	Western Bulldogs	22	12	10	0	1973	1812	108.9	48	Finals series
9	Carlton	22	12	10	0	1857	1714	108.3	48	
10	St Kilda	22	11	11	0	1703	1715	99.3	44	
**11**	Port Adelaide	**22**	**10**	**12**	**0**	**1806**	**1638**	**110.3**	40	
12	Gold Coast	22	10	12	0	1871	1820	102.8	40	
13	Hawthorn	22	8	14	0	1787	1991	89.8	32	
14	Adelaide	22	8	14	0	1721	1986	86.7	32	
15	Essendon	22	7	15	0	1737	2087	83.2	28	
16	Greater Western Sydney	22	6	16	0	1631	1927	84.6	24	
17	West Coast	22	2	20	0	1429	2389	59.8	8	
18	North Melbourne	22	2	20	0	1337	2397	55.8	8	

Source: afl.com.au
Rules for classification: 1) points; 2) percentage; 3) number of points for.
(P) Premiers

== SANFL season ==
=== Pre-season ===
**Date and time**	**Opponent**	**Scores** (Port Adelaide's scores indicated in **bold**)			**Venue**	**Ref.**
**Date and time**	**Opponent**	Home	Away	Result	**Venue**	**Ref.**
Saturday, 5 March (10:00 am)	Woodville-West Torrens	**10.9 (69)**	11.7 (73)	Lost by 4 points	Alberton Oval (H)	
Saturday, 19 March (12:00 pm)	North Adelaide	**10.10 (70)**	11.9 (75)	Lost by 5 points	Alberton Oval (H)	

=== Regular season ===
**Rd**	**Date and time**	**Opponent**	**Scores** (Port Adelaide's scores indicated in **bold**)			**Venue**	**Attendance**	**Ladder**	**Ref.**
**Rd**	**Date and time**	**Opponent**	Home	Away	Result	**Venue**	**Attendance**	**Ladder**	**Ref.**
1	Friday, 1 April (4:10 pm)	Adelaide	18.15 (123)	**8.13 (61)**	Lost by 62 points	Adelaide Oval (A)	N/A	10th	
2	Saturday, 9 April (2:10 pm)	South Adelaide	**14.17 (101)**	17.9 (111)	Lost by 10 points	Alberton Oval (H)	1,160	9th	
3	Friday, 15 April (7:40 pm)	Norwood	11.9 (75)	**8.11 (59)**	Lost by 16 points	Norwood Oval (A)	3,225	9th	
4	Sunday, 24 April (2:10 pm)	Sturt	**7.8 (50)**	9.9 (63)	Lost by 13 points	Alberton Oval (H)	2,221	9th	
5	Sunday, 1 May (2:10 pm)	Glenelg	9.12 (66)	**10.9 (69)**	Won by 3 points	Glenelg Oval (A)	2,982	8th	
6	Saturday, 7 May (2:10 pm)	Woodville-West Torrens	**7.5 (47)**	11.7 (73)	Lost by 26 points	Alberton Oval (H)	1,895	8th	
7	Sunday, 22 May (2:10 pm)	West Adelaide	12.9 (81)	**15.15 (105)**	Won by 24 points	Loxton Oval (A)	3,756	8th	
8	Saturday, 28 May (1:10 pm)	North Adelaide	**5.11 (41)**	12.16 (88)	Lost by 47 points	Alberton Oval (H)	1,218	8th	
9	Bye							8th	
10	Saturday, 11 June (2:10 pm)	Central District	8.9 (57)	**11.8 (74)**	Won by 17 points	Elizabeth Oval (A)	1,514	8th	
11	Sunday, 19 June (1:10 pm)	Norwood	**11.10 (76)**	15.4 (94)	Lost by 18 points	Alberton Oval (H)	1,644	8th	
12	Saturday, 25 June (2:10 pm)	Glenelg	**4.13 (37)**	11.10 (76)	Lost by 39 points	Alberton Oval (H)	1,801	8th	
13	Saturday, 2 July (2:10 pm)	North Adelaide	20.16 (136)	**1.4 (10)**	Lost by 126 points	Prospect Oval (A)	2,017	9th	
14	Saturday, 9 July (2:10 pm)	Woodville-West Torrens	13.11 (89)	**4.5 (29)**	Lost by 60 points	Woodville Oval (A)	1,632	9th	
15	Saturday, 16 July (2:10 pm)	West Adelaide	**7.12 (54)**	12.9 (81)	Lost by 27 points	Richmond Oval (H) (Note: Port Adelaide's round 15 and round 16 matches were moved to Richmond Oval and Woodville Oval respectively due to redevelopment works taking place at Alberton Oval.)	1,071	9th	
16	Saturday, 23 July (2:10 pm)	Central District	**11.8 (74)**	7.9 (51)	Won by 23 points	Woodville Oval (H)	676	9th	
17	Saturday, 6 August (2:10 pm)	Sturt	13.7 (85)	**7.12 (54)**	Lost by 31 points	Unley Oval (A)	1,749	9th	
18	Sunday, 14 August (1:35 pm)	South Adelaide	10.9 (69)	**9.6 (60)**	Lost by 9 points	Noarlunga Oval (A)	1,025	9th	
19	Saturday, 20 August (2:10 pm)	Adelaide	**11.9 (75)**	10.12 (72)	Won by 3 points	Adelaide Oval (H)	N/A	8th	

=== Ladder ===
Pos	Team	Pld	W	L	D	PF	PA	PP	Pts	Qualification
1	North Adelaide	18	13	5	0	1577	1181	57.18	26	Finals series
2	Adelaide	18	12	6	0	1692	1245	57.61	24	Finals series
3	Norwood (P)	18	12	6	0	1276	1102	53.66	24	Finals series
4	Glenelg	18	12	6	0	1334	1260	51.43	24	Finals series
5	Sturt	18	11	7	0	1256	1136	52.51	22	Finals series
6	South Adelaide	18	9	9	0	1158	1167	49.81	18	
7	Woodville-West Torrens	18	9	9	0	1235	1260	49.50	18	
**8**	Port Adelaide	**18**	**5**	**13**	**0**	**1076**	**1490**	**41.93**	10	
9	Central District	18	4	14	0	1118	1447	43.59	8	
10	West Adelaide	18	3	15	0	1123	1557	41.90	6	

Updated to match(es) played on 23 August 2022. Source:
Rules for classification: 1) points; 2) percentage; 3) number of points for.
(P) Premiers

== AFLW season ==
=== Pre-season ===
**Date and time**	**Opponent**	**Scores** (Port Adelaide's scores indicated in **bold**)			**Venue**	**Ref.**
**Date and time**	**Opponent**	Home	Away	Result	**Venue**	**Ref.**
Saturday, 13 August (11:00 am)	Essendon	8.8 (56)	**5.6 (36)**	Lost by 20 points	NEC Hangar	

=== Regular season ===
**Rd**	**Date and time**	**Opponent**	**Scores** (Port Adelaide's scores indicated in **bold**)			**Venue**	**Attendance**	**Ladder**	**Ref.**
**Rd**	**Date and time**	**Opponent**	Home	Away	Result	**Venue**	**Attendance**	**Ladder**	**Ref.**
1	Saturday, 27 August (1:10 pm)	West Coast	6.4 (40)	**4.4 (28)**	Lost by 12 points	Mineral Resources Park (A)	1,846	12th	
2	Saturday, 3 September (1:10 pm)	Western Bulldogs	**1.3 (9)**	3.10 (28)	Lost by 19 points	Alberton Oval (H)	5,367	14th	
3	Sunday, 11 September (12:10 pm)	Carlton	4.3 (27)	**4.3 (27)**	Draw	Ikon Park (A)	1,664	15th	
4	Saturday, 17 September (12:40 pm)	Sydney	**10.8 (68)**	0.2 (2)	Won by 66 points	Alberton Oval (H)	2,741	14th	
5	Sunday, 25 September (1:10 pm)	Gold Coast	7.4 (46)	**5.2 (32)**	Lost by 14 points	Bond University (A)	1,419	14th	
6	Friday, 30 September (7:30 pm)	Adelaide	**0.3 (3)**	8.15 (63)	Lost by 60 points	Adelaide Oval (H)	20,652	16th	
7	Saturday, 8 October (7:10 pm)	Hawthorn	4.5 (29)	**1.10 (16)**	Lost by 13 points	SkyBus Stadium (A)	2,029	16th	
8	Saturday, 15 October (12:40 pm)	North Melbourne	**4.5 (29)**	7.12 (54)	Lost by 25 points	Alberton Oval (H)	2,818	16th	
9	Sunday, 23 October (1:10 pm)	St Kilda	4.11 (35)	**5.3 (33)**	Lost by 2 points	RSEA Park (A)	1,514	17th	
10	Sunday, 30 October (12:40 pm)	Essendon	**1.4 (10)**	5.7 (37)	Lost by 27 points	Alberton Oval (H)	2,096	17th	

=== Ladder ===
Pos	Team	Pld	W	L	D	PF	PA	PP	Pts	Qualification
1	Brisbane	10	9	1	0	545	193	282.4	36	Finals series
2	Melbourne (P)	10	9	1	0	519	184	282.1	36	Finals series
3	Adelaide	10	8	2	0	412	232	177.6	32	Finals series
4	Richmond	10	7	2	1	321	217	147.9	30	Finals series
5	Geelong	10	7	3	0	384	222	173.0	28	Finals series
6	Collingwood	10	7	3	0	289	244	118.4	28	Finals series
7	Western Bulldogs	10	7	3	0	326	297	109.8	28	Finals series
8	North Melbourne	10	6	3	1	382	229	166.8	26	Finals series
9	Gold Coast	10	5	5	0	309	351	88.0	20	
10	Essendon	10	4	6	0	349	354	98.6	16	
11	Greater Western Sydney	10	4	6	0	265	420	63.1	16	
12	Fremantle	10	3	6	1	267	400	66.8	14	
13	St Kilda	10	3	7	0	307	373	82.3	12	
14	Carlton	10	2	6	2	253	342	74.0	12	
15	Hawthorn	10	3	7	0	245	429	57.1	12	
16	West Coast	10	2	8	0	239	449	53.2	8	
**17**	Port Adelaide	**10**	**1**	**8**	**1**	**255**	**361**	**70.6**	6	
18	Sydney	10	0	10	0	207	577	35.9	0	

Source: afl.com.au
Rules for classification: 1) points; 2) percentage; 3) number of points for
(P) Premiers

== Awards ==
=== Power (AFL) ===
- John Cahill Medal – Connor Rozee
- Runner Up – Travis Boak
- Bruce Weber Medal – Dan Houston
- Fos Williams Medal – Travis Boak
- Gavin Wanganeen Award – Lachie Jones
- Coaches’ Award – Connor Rozee
- John McCarthy Award – Sam Mayes

=== Magpies (SANFL) ===
- A.R. McLean Medal – Cam Sutcliffe
- A.R McLean Medal Runner-Up – Sam Mayes
- A. Williams Memorial Trophy – Nick Moore
- Leading goalkicker – Dylan Williams (20 goals)
- Bob Clayton Award – Alf Trebilcock

=== Power (AFLW) ===
- Best and Fairest Medal – Hannah Ewings
- Runner-Up Medal – Erin Phillips
- Third Place Medal – Abbey Dowrick
- Best First Year Player – Hannah Ewings
- Most Improved – Ella Boag
- Players’ Player – Ebony O'Dea
