= Glenn Strachan =

Australian rules footballer and coach (born 1990)

- Strachan with the Northern Blues in 2018

Personal information
- Born: 6 July 1990 (age 36)
- Height: 184 cm (6 ft 0 in)
- Weight: 85 kg (187 lb)

Playing career
| Years | Club | Games (Goals) |
| 2013–2014 | Collingwood reserves | 7 |
| 2015–2021 | Northern Blues/Bullants | 62 (15) |
| Total | | 69 (15) |

Coaching career
| Years | Club | Games (W–L–D) |
| 2026– | Port Adelaide (W) | 0 (0–0–0) |

Glenn Strachan (born 6 July 1990) is an Australian rules football coach and former player who currently serves as the senior coach of the Port Adelaide Football Club in the AFL Women's (AFLW). He previously played for Collingwood's reserves team and the Preston Football Club (known as the Northern Blues and Northern Bullants at the time) in the Victorian Football League (VFL) between 2013 and 2021.

== Playing career ==
Strachan joined Collingwood's reserves team in the Victorian Football League (VFL) in 2013 as a top-up player. He played six matches for Collingwood during the 2014 season, including the elimination final loss to Sandringham.

On 6 November 2014, Strachan was announced as the Northern Blues' first recruit for the 2015 VFL season. He became the club's co-vice-captain in 2016 alongside Zach Ballard.

The 2020 VFL season was cancelled because of the COVID-19 pandemic, which also resulted in the Carlton Football Club ending its reserves affiliation with the Northern Blues. While the Northern Blues initially announced that it would fold, the club regrouped throughout the year and remained in the VFL (under its previous name of the Northern Bullants). Strachan played all ten matches for the Bullants during the curtailed 2021 season, before announcing his VFL retirement at the end of the year.

== Coaching career ==
In 2023, Strachan joined the Carlton Football Club as a senior assistant coach for the club's AFL Women's (AFLW) team. He coached Carlton's VFL Women's (VFLW) team for one season in 2024 before being replaced by Aasta O'Connor, although he remained involved with on-field and performance strategy.

On 11 March 2026, Strachan was appointed by the Port Adelaide Football Club as the club's senior coach in the AFL Women's (AFLW).
