= Jasmine Evans =

Australian rules footballer

- Evans in 2026

Personal information
- Full name: Jasmine Evans
- Born: 5 February 2006 (age 20); South Australia
- Original teams: Salisbury (junior hockey & football) / Central District (SANFLW)
- Draft: No. 33, 2024 AFLW national draft
- Debut: TBA, Port Adelaide
- Height: 166 cm (5 ft 5 in)
- Position: Forward / Wing

Playing career^{1}
Years	Club	Games (Goals)
2025–	Port Adelaide	0 (0)
- ^{1} Playing statistics correct to the end of 2024.

Jasmine Evans (born 5 February 2006) is an Australian rules footballer playing for the Port Adelaide in the AFL Women's (AFLW). She primarily plays midfielder or forward.

== Early life ==
Evans played hockey when she was young before switching to Australian rules football and joined the Salisbury Football Club.

== Career ==
She debuted in 2021 and played in both the Under 15s and Under 16s. In 2023, she got a spot in Central District Football Club as a premiership player and played with Caitlin Wendland. She helped the team score a goal against Norwood Football Club and finished the season with 13 goals from 14 games. The next uear, she was drafted by Port Adelaide. Evans received the number three guernsey from vice-captain Ange Foley for the 2025 SANFLW season.
