= Jade de Melo =

Australian rules footballer

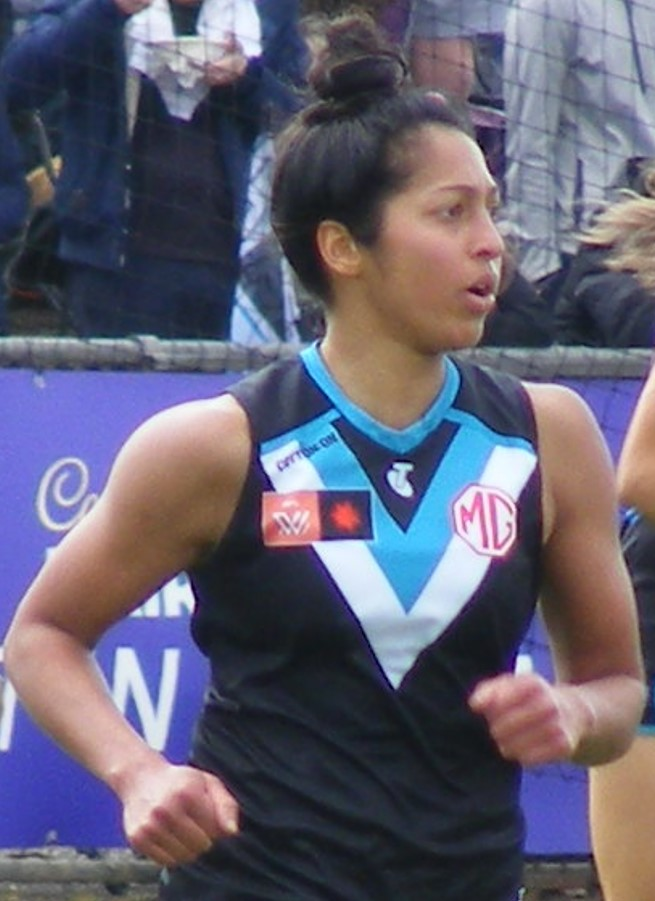
- De Melo playing for Port Adelaide in 2022

Personal information
- Born: 9 February 1993 (age 33)
- Original team: East Fremantle (WAWFL)
- Draft: No. 10, 2017 AFL Women's rookie draft
- Debut: Round 5, 2018, Fremantle vs. Greater Western Sydney, at Fremantle Oval
- Height: 169 cm (5 ft 7 in)
- Position: Forward

Club information
- Current club: Port Adelaide

Playing career^{1}
Years	Club	Games (Goals)
2018	Fremantle	2 (0)
S7 (2022-2023)	Port Adelaide	10 (4)
Total		12 (4)
- ^{1} Playing statistics correct to the end of the S7 (2022) season.

Career highlights
- SANFLW Premiership Player: 2022

Jade de Melo (born 9 February 1993) is an Australian rules footballer who last played for Port Adelaide in the AFL Women's (AFLW). After being overlooked in the national draft days earlier, de Melo was eventually drafted by Fremantle with their second selection and the 10th overall pick in the 2017 AFL Women's rookie draft. She made her debut in an 18-point loss to Greater Western Sydney at Fremantle Oval in round 5 of the 2018 season. She was delisted by Fremantle at the end of the 2018 season.

De Melo played in North Adelaide's 2022 SANFLW premiership win, kicking three goals in the Grand Final.

On 31 May 2022, De Melo signed with AFLW expansion club Port Adelaide
