= Ashleigh Woodland =

Australian rules footballer (born 1998)

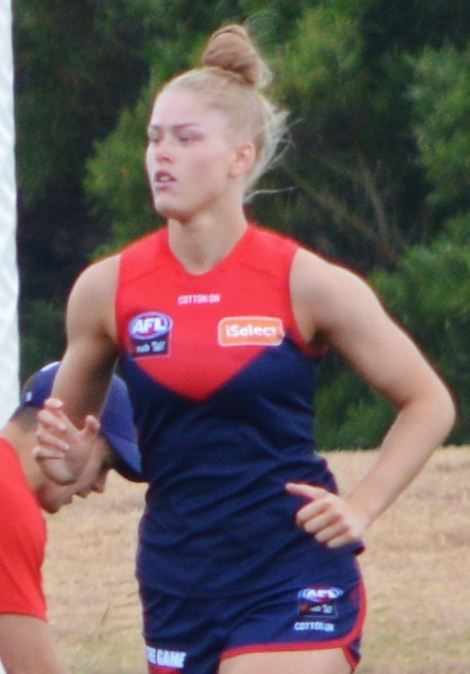
- Woodland during a pre-season practice match for Melbourne in 2019

Personal information
- Full name: Ashleigh Woodland
- Born: 9 September 1998 (age 28)
- Original team: North Adelaide (SANFLW)
- Draft: 2018 undrafted free agent
- Debut: Round 1, 2019, Melbourne vs. Fremantle, at Casey Fields
- Height: 176 cm (5 ft 9 in)
- Position: Key forward

Club information
- Current club: Port Adelaide
- Number: 8

Playing career^{1}
Years	Club	Games (Goals)
2019	Melbourne	4 (0)
2021–2022 (S7)	Adelaide	36 (44)
2023–	Port Adelaide	35 (27)
Total		75 (61)
- ^{1} Playing statistics correct to the end of the 2025 season.

Career highlights
- AFL Women's premiership player: S6; AFL Women's All-Australian team: S6; AFL Women's leading goalkicker: S6; 2× Adelaide leading goalkicker: S6, S7

Ashleigh Woodland (born 9 September 1998) is an Australian rules footballer playing for the Port Adelaide Football Club in the AFL Women's (AFLW). She previously played for the Melbourne Football Club in 2019 and the Adelaide Football Club from 2021 to season 7. Woodland won an AFL Women's premiership with Adelaide in season 6, and was selected in the 2022 AFL Women's season 6 All-Australian team and won the AFL Women's leading goalkicker award in the same season. She is a dual Adelaide leading goalkicker.

== AFL Women's career ==
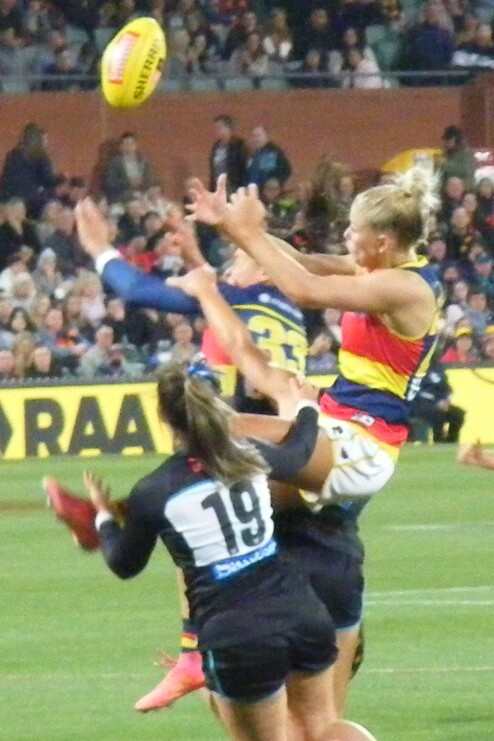
Woodland flying for a mark for Adelaide in the first AFL Women's Showdown in 2022

Woodland was signed by Melbourne as an undrafted free agent following the 2018 AFL Women's draft. She made her debut in loss to Fremantle at Casey Fields in round 1 of the 2019 season.

Woodland enjoyed a breakout season with Adelaide in 2022 (S6), starting the season with four goals in round one against Brisbane and another four in round two against North Melbourne. In the final minor round game against St Kilda, Woodland kicked two goals to win the AFLW leading goalkicker award with 19 goals, which at the time was the most ever in one season. Woodland and her team went on to win the premiership over Melbourne in the season 6 Grand Final.

In March 2023, during the new Priority signing period, Woodland joined Port Adelaide. She finished the year as runner-up in the club's leading goalkicking, two goals behind Gemma Houghton.

== Honours and achievements ==
Team

- AFL Women's premiership player (Adelaide): S6
- 2× AFL Women's minor premiership (Adelaide): 2021, S6

Individual

- AFL Women's All-Australian team: S6
- AFL Women's leading goalkicker: S6
- 2× Adelaide leading goalkicker: S6, S7
