= Chloe Gaunt =

Australian rules footballer

- Gaunt in 2026

Personal information
- Full name: Chloe Gaunt
- Born: 22 July 2006 (age 20); Queensland, Australia
- Original teams: Brisbane Lions Academy (Talent League Girls); Southport / Coorparoo (QAFLW)
- Draft: No. 48, 2024 AFL Women's draft
- Debut: Round 2, 2025
- Height: 182 cm (6 ft 0 in)
- Position: Forward / ruck

Club information
- Current club: Port Adelaide
- Number: 31

Playing career^{1}
Years	Club	Games (Goals)
2025–	Port Adelaide	7 (2)
- ^{1} Playing statistics correct to the end of Round 3, 2026.

Chloe Gaunt (born 22 July 2006) is an Australian rules footballer who plays for the Port Adelaide Football Club in the AFL Women's (AFLW). She was drafted with pick 48 in the 2024 AFL Women's draft.

== Early life ==
Gaunt was active in athletics when she was young, and placed ninth in Australia for triple jump. She began playing Australian rules football after encouragement from her father, and has played in the Talent League Girls competition. She has played for the Brisbane Lions Academy team, and previously was a member of the Gold Coast Suns Academy. She also played for Coorparoo FC.

She placed in the top ten for both standing and running vertical leap tests at the 2024 AFLW National Draft Combine.

== AFLW career ==
Gaunt was drafted as pick 48 by Port Adelaide FC for the 2024 AFL Women's draft, and played in the ruck in the 2025 AFL Women's season. She has also played as a tall forward.

== Personal life ==
Gaunt has also worked as a disability support worker.
