= Tom Anastasopoulos =

Australian rules footballer (born 2005)

Personal information
- Born: 31 May 2005 (age 21)
- Original team: Newtown & Chilwell
- Draft: No. 48, 2023 national draft
- Height: 176 cm (5 ft 9 in)
- Position: Forward

Playing career
Years	Club	Games (Goals)
2026	Port Adelaide	5 (2)

Tom Anastasopoulos (born 31 May 2005) is an Australian rules footballer who played for Port Adelaide in the Australian Football League (AFL).

Raised in Geelong, Anastasopoulos attended St Joseph's College from grades seven to ten, before moving onto Geelong College for his final two years. He is of Greek descent and his family has roots in Athens.

Anastasopoulos is a small forward and came through the juniors at Newtown & Chilwell, where he was coached by former Geelong player David Wojcinski. He played for the Geelong Falcons in the Talent League, registering an accurate 21.2 in front of goals in 2023, and the same year represented Vic Country in three games at the AFL National Championships.

Selected by Port Adelaide with pick 48 in the 2023 national draft, Anastasopoulos spent his first two seasons playing in the SANFL, before getting his AFL opportunity in the 2026 season. He played five AFL games in 2026, featuring twice mid-season, and then for the final three rounds. At the end of the 2026 season, Anastasopoulos was delisted by Port Adelaide. He played 45 SANFL games during his time with Port Adelaide.
