= Lauren Young (footballer) =

Personal information
- Full name: Lauren Young
- Born: 16 September 2005 (age 21)
- Original team: West Adelaide (SANFLW)
- Height: 178 cm (5 ft 10 in)
- Position: Forward / utility

Playing career^{1}
Years	Club	Games (Goals)
2025–	Port Adelaide	3 (1)
- ^{1} Playing statistics correct to the end of 2025.

Lauren Young (born 16 September 2005) is an Australian rules footballer who plays for Port Adelaide in the AFL Women's (AFLW). and previously for West Adelaide in the SANFL Women's League (SANFLW).

In 2021, Young won the SANFLW best and fairest award, aged 15 and was selected to play for South Australia at the 2021 AFL Women's Under-19 Championships, where she was named at centre half-back in the All-Australian team.

Young missed the 2022 and 2024 SANFLW seasons due to ACL injuries, delaying her AFLW debut until the 2025 season.
