= Will Lorenz =

Personal information
- Born: 19 February 2005 (age 21)
- Original teams: Kew Rovers (YJFL); Boroondara (YJFL); Oakleigh Chargers (Talent League)
- Draft: No. 57, 2023 AFL draft
- Debut: Round 16, 2024, Port Adelaide vs. St Kilda, at Docklands Stadium
- Height: 186 cm (6 ft 1 in)
- Position: Midfielder

Playing career^{1}
Years	Club	Games (Goals)
2024–2026	Port Adelaide	11 (2)
- ^{1} Playing statistics correct to the end of 2026.

Will Lorenz (born 19 February 2005) is a former professional Australian rules footballer who played for the Port Adelaide Football Club in the Australian Football League (AFL).

== Pre-AFL career ==
Lorenz first played junior football for the Kew Rovers in the Yarra Junior Football League (YJFL). He also played in the YJFL for the Boroondara Hawks.

Lorenz played in the Talent League for the Oakleigh Chargers. In 2023, He was named in both the Under 18 Vic Metro squad and the AFL Academy list.

== AFL career ==
Lorenz was selected by Port Adelaide with pick 57 of the 2023 AFL draft. He made his debut in round 16 of the 2024 AFL season.

At the end of the 2025 AFL season, Lorenz signed a one-year contract extension to the end of 2026. He was delisted by Port Adelaide at the end of the 2026 AFL season.

== Personal life ==
Lorenz is the grandson of 1961 Hawthorn premiership captain Graham Arthur. He attended school at Marcellin College.
