= Port Adelaide Football Club (AFL Women's) =

Port Adelaide Football club women's team

Names
- Full name: Port Adelaide Football Club Limited
- Nickname(s): Port, Power, Yartapuulti
- Motto: Herstory in the Making; We Exist To Win Premierships
- Club song: Power to Win

2025 season
- Home-and-away season: 10th
- Leading goalkicker: Indy Tahau (25 goals)
- Best and fairest: Matilda Scholz

Club details
- Colours: Black White; Teal Silver
- Competition: AFLW
- Chairperson: David Koch
- CEO: Matthew Richardson
- Coach: Glenn Strachan
- Captain: Justine Mules-Robinson
- Ground: Alberton Oval (capacity: 11,000)
- Training ground: Alberton Oval

Uniforms
Home	Away	Showdowns

Other information
- Official website: portadelaidefc.com.au

Port Adelaide Football Club, commonly referred to as Port Adelaide AFLW if distinguishing themselves from the men's team, is a professional women's Australian rules football club based in Alberton, South Australia. Formed in 2021, the team has competed in the AFL Women's (AFLW) competition as the official women's division of Port Adelaide Football Club since AFLW season 7.

The team plays their home games at Alberton Oval, and competes wearing guernseys in the colours of black, white and teal. The team has an intense rivalry with intra-city opponents Adelaide; the two compete in an annual fixture known as the 'Showdown'.

== History ==
=== Early participation in women's football ===
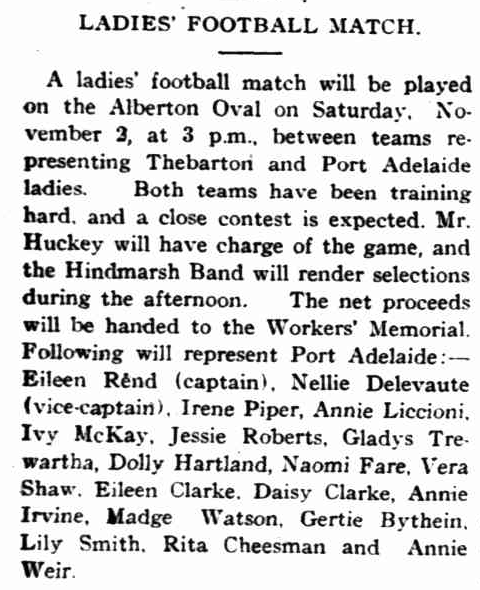
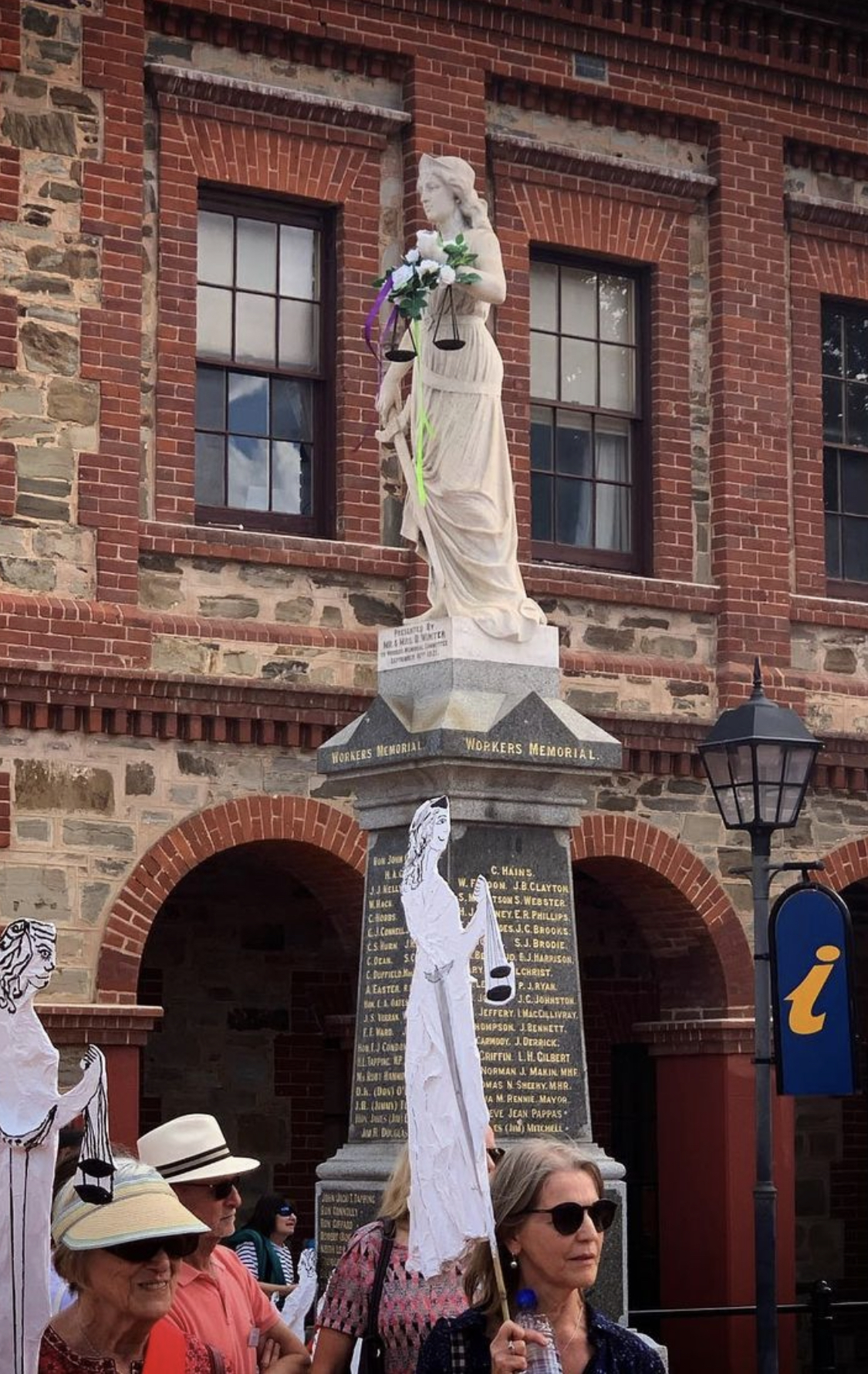
Left: 1918 Port Adelaide team from the clubs 'Ladies Football Match' against a team representing Thebarton held on Alberton Oval.
Right: This match helped raise funds to construct the Port Adelaide Workers Memorial (pictured).

Port Adelaide has a long-standing record of participation in women's football. The earliest recorded instance of the club fielding a women's side was in 1918, when a Port Adelaide team played a match against Thebarton at Alberton Oval, as part of a fundraiser for the Port Adelaide Workers Memorial. Port Adelaide was defeated 6.14 (50) to 1.0 (6), with the Daily Herald praising the Thebarton side for their strong performance. The team was captained by Eileen Reid for the match, with the team's sole goal kicked by Jessie Roberts. In 2004, Jenny Williams, daughter of nine-time Port Adelaide premiership coach Fos Williams, organised a Women's Showdown as a curtain raiser to Port Adelaide's home game at Football Park. The Port Adelaide Women's side won the match 16.5 (101) to Adelaide's 1.1 (7) with Erin Phillips, whose father Greg played in 343 games and eight premierships with the club in the South Australian National Football League (SANFL), winning the best and fairest medal for the match. Port Adelaide would also participate in two further senior women's Showdown matches in 2019, with support from the SANFL. These matches marked the first occasion the club was officially represented by a senior women's team.

Port Adelaide also recognised women's involvement in football outside of matches. Port Adelaide became the first SANFL club to award life membership to a woman in 1951, with Ruby Dewar being given the honour due to her longstanding service for the club. Club secretary Bob McLean praised her contribution, saying that she had over 29 years "organised probably more than 100 functions for us — balls, dinners, competitions — as convener of the women's social committee." Port Adelaide has since awarded 17 women life membership at the club. In 2016, Port Adelaide partnered with the Port Adelaide Women's Football Club, an independent local team competing in the South Australian Women's Football League. As part of the partnership, Port Adelaide gave the team access to training and development facilities at Alberton Oval. The club also committed to developing a women's academy the same year, with the goal of growing female participation in Australian rules football. The academy launched in 2018, with 42 girls participating in its initial year.

Following large increases in female participation in Australian rules football in 2015, discussions about the potential of a national women's AFL competition were held. On 16 December 2015, Port Adelaide announced that Erin Phillips had entered into an agreement with the club to be their first women's footballer, on the contingency the club received a licence for any prospective competition. Due to logistical demands associated with the club's China program, particularly regarding the need for additional revenue streams, the club opted not to bid for an AFLW licence for the 2017 season. The club subsequently attempted to enter a side in the SANFL Women's League (SANFLW), but this approach was rejected by the South Australian Football Commission.

=== Formation and early years (2021–present) ===
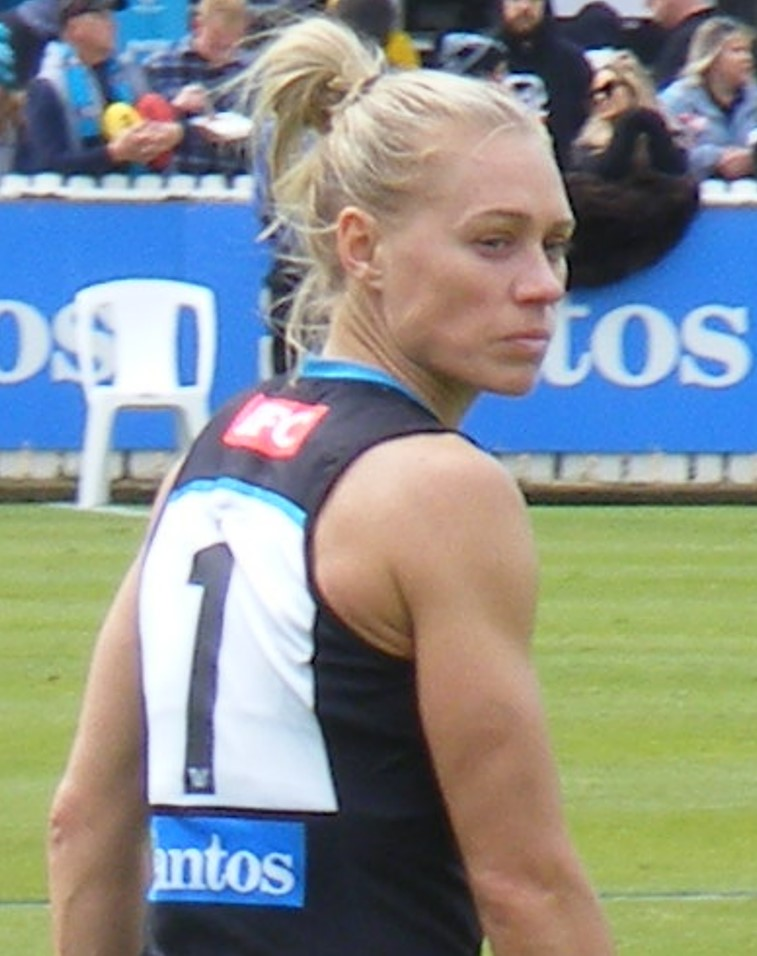
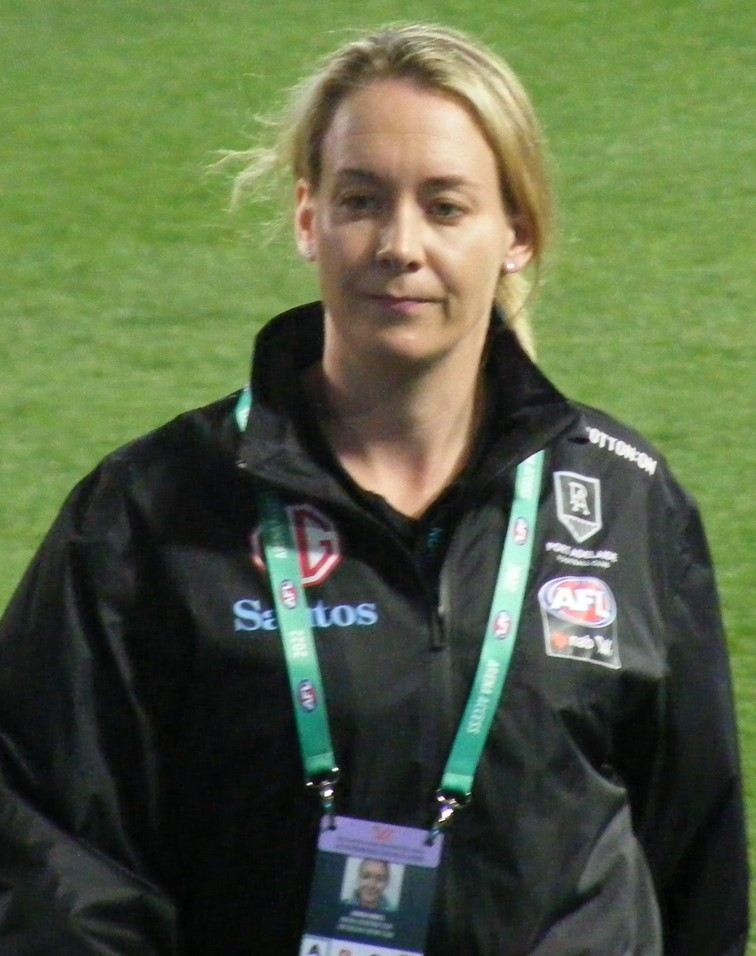
Left: Erin Phillips was Port Adelaide's inaugural captain in the AFLW.
Right: Lauren Arnell was Port Adelaide's inaugural coach in the AFLW.

In May 2021, the AFL Commission announced that the remaining four clubs without AFLW teams would be admitted to the competition by the end of 2023, with the clubs to bid for entry order. Port Adelaide's bid to enter the competition was successful, with the AFL Commission deciding all four clubs would debut in the AFLW in 2022 season 7.

During late 2021 and early 2022, Port Adelaide began selecting key members of their women's football department. Juliet Haslam was appointed the club's head of women's football, with Naomi Maidment appointed as the club's inaugural AFLW list manager and Rachael Sporn appointed as operations manager. In April 2022, former Carlton captain and Brisbane premiership player Lauren Arnell was announced as Port Adelaide's inaugural AFLW coach.

As part of their entry to the AFLW, the club was permitted to partake in the AFLW Expansion Signing Period. During the period, the club was permitted to sign 'open-age' players who had previously nominated for the NAB AFLW Draft and weren't on an AFLW list, as well as sign up to 14 players from existing AFLW clubs. Prior to the period opening, the club announced that Erin Phillips, who had since played in three premierships with Adelaide, was the club's inaugural AFLW player signing. The club would sign a further 13 players from existing AFLW teams, and 10 players via the 'open-age' signing method. In August, Phillips was named Port Adelaide's inaugural AFLW captain.

Port Adelaide finished second-last (17th) in their debut season in the competition. The club played their first match against the West Coast Eagles on 27 August 2022, and won their first match in round 4 against Sydney, winning by 66 points.

AFLW 2024 Second Semi Final	G	B	Total
Hawthorn	6	13	49
Port Adelaide	7	8	50
Venue: Ikon Park	Crowd: 3,680

The team had a breakout 2024 season, claiming a maiden finals appearance and winning eight games in a row. They reached a preliminary final, where they were defeated by eventual premiers North Melbourne. The streak included a semi-final victory over Hawthorn, which was notable for being the biggest three-quarter time comeback in AFLW history. The following season, Gemma Houghton became the first player in league history to reach 100 career goals, registering the milestone with a kick after the game in the final match of the season. Lauren Arnell resigned as coach following the conclusion of the 2025 season, and was replaced by former Carlton assistant coach Glenn Strachan.

== Club symbols ==
=== Guernseys ===
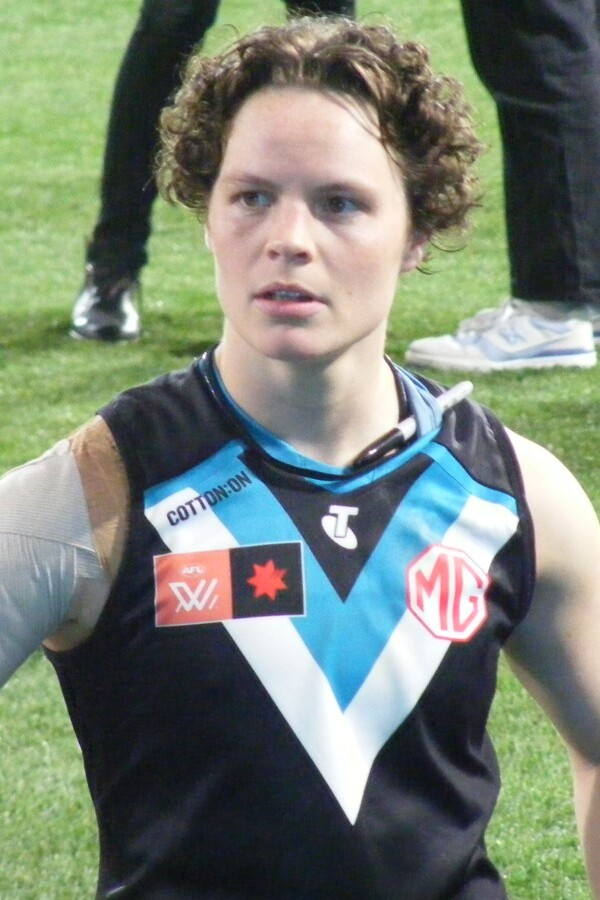
Ebony O'Dea wearing the Port Adelaide guernsey in 2022

Since formation, Port Adelaide has primarily worn the same guernsey design as the men's team - a black base, featuring a double chevron in teal and white. The women's team wears a unique away guernsey, consisting of a teal base with black and white chevrons.

The team also wears special guernseys for designated event rounds. Each year, the AFLW holds two designated event rounds: Indigenous Round, a round designed to recognise and celebrate Indigenous Australian culture and history in Australian football, and Pride Round, a round designed to celebrate queer culture in the AFLW. These rounds are celebrated by the club with guernseys that incorporate significant elements from the relevant communities to show support. The 2025 Indigenous round guernsey was the first time the men's and women's teams wore the same guernsey design for each competition's respective Indigenous round.

During 2023, Port Adelaide negotiated an agreement with Collingwood and the AFL to allow them to wear the 'Prison Bar' guernsey during all future home Showdown matches. The guernsey has a long association with the club, having been used since 1902 in the SANFL, and on various occasions in the AFL. The women's team first wore the guernsey in its home Showdown match in Round 1 of the 2024 season, and has since worn the guernsey in successive home Showdowns.

=== Song ===
As part of the entry of the men's team to the AFL, Port Adelaide chose to adopt the club song "Power to Win", written for the club by Quentin Eyers and Les Kaczmarek. The song was directly adopted by the women's team when the team entered the AFLW. The song is played prior to each match, and immediately following a match if the club is victorious. The winning team also sings the song in the centre of the field following a victory. During Indigenous Round, an alternative Pitjantjatjara language version of the song ('Nganana wanangara kanyini' – literally, 'We have the lightning bolt') is used by the club.

Since 2014, Port Adelaide has used "Never Tear Us Apart" by the Australian band INXS as the club's unofficial anthem in the AFL, being played during the lead up to the start of the game during home matches. The song was adopted by the women's team upon their entry to the AFLW, being played in the same manner during all home matches. The song is used as a reference to the various and unique difficulties the club faced when trying to enter the AFL, primarily in regard to the separation of its SANFL and AFL operations. Port Adelaide's use of the song stems from a trip the men's team took to Anfield in November 2012. The song was adopted to replicate the pre-match anthem used by Liverpool F.C, which was highly praised by the Port Adelaide playing group. The song proved to be a success among the fans, with them adopting the song as well as raising scarves above their heads as the song was being sung.

=== Motto ===
Prior to their entry to the AFLW, Port Adelaide launched a marketing campaign to promote the new team themed around the phrase "Herstory in the Making." Based off the pre-existing phrase from the club's song, the motto was used to highlight the impact and importance of Port Adelaide's entry in the national women's competition.

The campaign won a marketing excellence award from the Australian Marketing Institute in 2023 under the category of "Product or Service Launch or Relaunch", with marketing team leader Jessica Green also receiving an individual award for her work on the campaign.

== Home ground ==
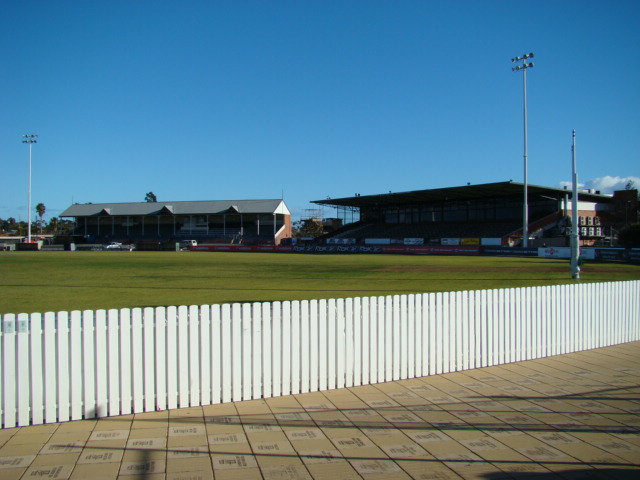
Alberton Oval

Since joining the AFLW competition, Port Adelaide has used Alberton Oval as both their home ground for matches and their training ground. The ground has been used near-continuously by the club's men's team since 1880 in the SANFL competition.

The ground has a maximum capacity of 11,000, and contains two grandstands named after individuals important in the club's history. The Fos Williams Family Stand, named after nine-time Port Adelaide premiership coach Fos Williams, was first constructed in 1903 and is the oldest remaining structure at Alberton Oval. The other grandstand, the Robert B. Quinn MM Grandstand, was first opened in 1964, and was named after former men's player Bob Quinn - he won two Magarey Medals, three premierships and four club best and fairests with Port Adelaide. Located beside the ground are the Allan Scott Power Headquarters, the club's administration building, which opened in 1999 and is named after the initial major sponsor for the men's team in the AFL.

== Rivalries ==
Port Adelaide has a fierce rivalry with fellow South Australian AFL team Adelaide, derived from a long-standing rivalry between the two clubs in the men's competition. Matches between the two teams are known as the 'Showdown'. The rivalry between Adelaide and Port Adelaide is often considered to be among the best rivalries in the Australian Football League, with Malcolm Blight, Australian Football Hall of Fame Legend, stating in 2009 of that "there is no doubt it is the greatest rivalry in football".

As of 1 June 2026, the two clubs have contested four matches in the AFLW, with Adelaide winning three, and Port Adelaide winning one. Port Adelaide won its first AFLW Showdown on 24 October 2025, defeating Adelaide by seven points with Abbey Dowrick being awarded the Showdown medal.

A Port Adelaide side has also contested three unofficial Showdown matches prior to their entry to the AFLW; one in 2004, and two in 2019. The 2004 match, organised by Jenny Williams, was played as a curtain raiser to a men's showdown, and was broadcast by Foxtel. The 2019 matches were played on 8 June and 21 July of that year, with teams composed of the best performing senior women's players from the SANFLW. Port Adelaide won all three matches, winning the 2004 match by 94 points, and the two 2019 matches by 3 and 36 points respectively.

== Players ==
=== Playing list ===
Port Adelaide Football Club · AFL Women's personnel
Senior list		Coaching staff
1 Justine Mules-Robinson (c); 2 Ebony O'Dea; 3 Jasmine Evans; 4 Piper Window; 5 Abbey Dowrick; 6 Molly Brooksby; 7 Ellie Hampson; 8 Ashleigh Woodland; 9 Maria Moloney; 10 Indy Tahau; 11 Caitlin Wendland; 12 Ella Heads; 13 Lucy Boyd; 15 Julia Teakle; 16 Shineah Goody; 17 Ella Boag	18 Jemma Charity; 19 Olivia Crane; 20 Sachi Syme (vc); 21 Amelie Borg (vc); 22 Lauren Young; 23 Sophie Eaton; 25 Grace Parsons; 26 Emily Elkington; 27 Gemma Houghton; 28 Cheyenne Hammond; 29 Matilda Scholz; 30 Teagan Germech; 31 Chloe Gaunt; 32 Jasmine Sowden; 35 Kirsty Lamb; 44 Katelyn Pope	Head coach: Glenn Strachan; Assistant coaches: Sam Virgo (back line); Aiden Yelland (midfield); Braedon Talbot (forward line); Logan Austin (development); Troy Wilkey (development); Legend: (c) Captain(s); (vc) Vice-captain(s); italics – Inactive; (ret) Retired; Pregnancy; Long-term injury; Updated: 4 October 2026; Source(s): Players, coaches, injuries

=== Player achievements ===
==== Best and fairest ====
^	Denotes current player

Season	Winner	Runner–up	Third–place	Ref.
2022 (S7)	Hannah Ewings	Erin Phillips	Abbey Dowrick^	
2023	Abbey Dowrick^	Gemma Houghton^	Matilda Scholz^	
2024	Matilda Scholz^	Abbey Dowrick^	Ashleigh Woodland^	
2025	Matilda Scholz^	Ashleigh Woodland^	Indy Tahau^	

== Corporate ==
Guernsey sponsors
Period	Front sponsor	Back sponsor
2022–25	MG Motor	Santos Limited

=== Administrative positions ===
- Chairman: David Koch
- Chief executive: Matthew Richardson
- Football operations: Ben Rutten
- Board members:
  - David Koch
  - Grantley Stevens
  - Cos Cardone
  - Holly Ransom
  - Kevin Osborn
  - Greg Columbus
  - Tara Page
  - George Fiacchi

=== Sponsors ===
Major sponsors

- Santos Limited
- KFC
- MG Motor
- Allied Waste (SANFL)
- Macron (apparel sponsor)

== Club honour roll ==
Port Adelaide Football Club (women's) honour board
Year	Position	Chairman	CEO	Coach	Captain	Best & Fairest	Leading goalkicker	
2022 (S7)	Seventeenth	David Koch	Matthew Richardson	Lauren Arnell	Erin Phillips	Hannah Ewings	Hannah Ewings; Jade de Melo; Gemma Houghton; Brittany Perry	4
2023	Fifteenth	David Koch	Matthew Richardson	Lauren Arnell	Erin Phillips	Abbey Dowrick	Gemma Houghton	16
2024	Fourth	David Koch	Matthew Richardson	Lauren Arnell	Janelle Cuthbertson	Matilda Scholz	Gemma Houghton^{2}	17
2025	Tenth	David Koch	Matthew Richardson	Lauren Arnell	Justine Mules-Robinson	Matilda Scholz^{2}	Indy Tahau^{✪}	25
⚑ = Premier ★ = League Best and Fairest ✪ = League Leading Goalkicker^{2} = Multiple Best & Fairest or Leading Goalkicker
