= Justine Mules-Robinson =

Australian rules footballer

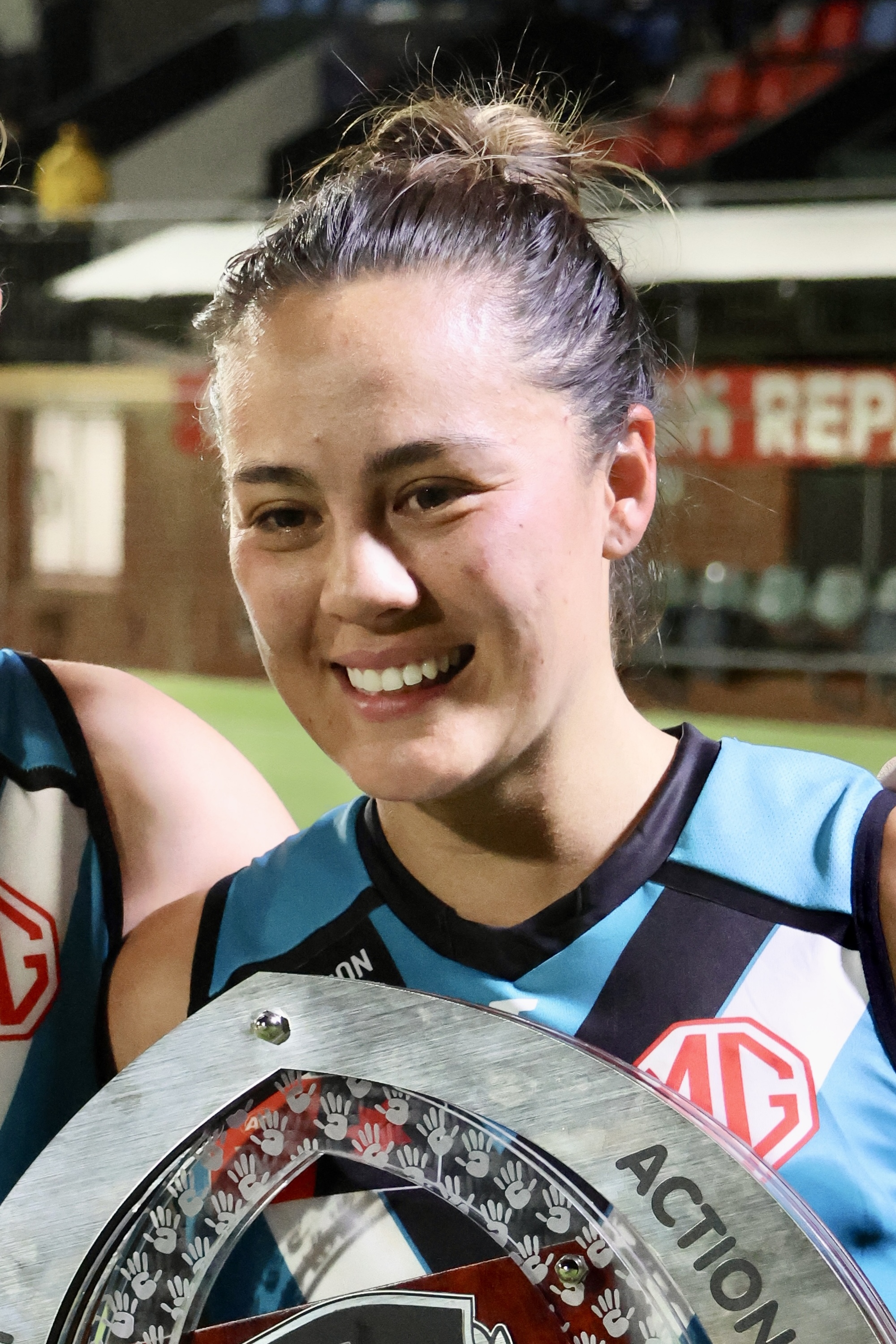
- Mules-Robinson post-match with Port Adelaide in 2025

Personal information
- Full name: Justine Mules-Robinson
- Born: 15 December 1994 (age 31)
- Original team: Morphettville Park (SAWFL)
- Draft: No. 133, 2016 AFL Women's draft
- Debut: Round 1, 2017, Adelaide vs. Greater Western Sydney, at Thebarton Oval
- Height: 162 cm (5 ft 4 in)
- Position: Midfielder

Club information
- Current club: Port Adelaide
- Number: 1

Playing career^{1}
Years	Club	Games (Goals)
2017–2022 (S6)	Adelaide	49 (4)
2022 (S7)–	Port Adelaide	45 (12)
Total		94 (16)
- ^{1} Playing statistics correct to the end of the 2025 season.

Career highlights
- 3× AFL Women's premiership player: 2017, 2019, S6; Port Adelaide captain: 2025–

Justine Mules-Robinson (born 15 December 1994) is an Australian rules footballer playing for the Port Adelaide Football Club in the AFL Women's (AFLW). She previously played for the Adelaide Football Club from 2017 to season 6. Mules-Robinson won three AFL Women's premierships with Adelaide and has served as Port Adelaide captain since 2025.

== Early life ==
Mules-Robinson was born to a Filipino mother and Australian father. She began playing football in 2013 while at Flinders University on recommendation from a friend.

== AFL Women's career ==
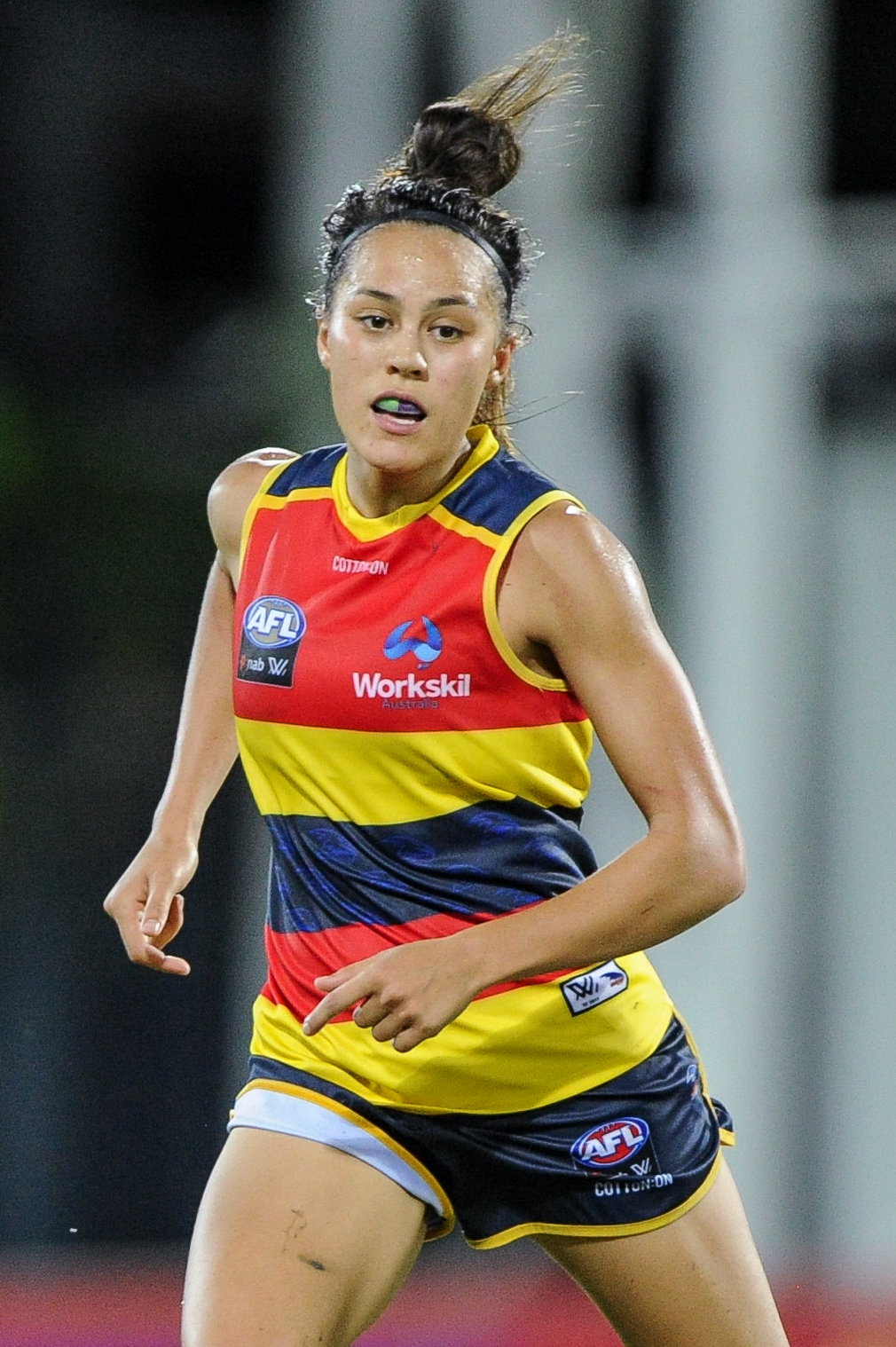
Mules-Robinson during a pre-season practice match for Adelaide in 2018

=== Adelaide (2017–2022) ===
Mules-Robinson was drafted by Adelaide with their seventeenth selection and 133rd overall in the 2016 AFL Women's draft. She made her AFLW debut in the thirty-six point win against Greater Western Sydney at Thebarton Oval in the opening round of the 2017 season. She struggled to maintain a spot in the side when she was omitted for the round two match against the Western Bulldogs at VU Whitten Oval, the round four match against Fremantle at Fremantle Oval and the round six match against Melbourne at TIO Stadium. She played her first consecutive games for the season in the round seven match against Collingwood at Olympic Park Oval and when she was a part of Adelaide's premiership side after the club defeated Brisbane by six points at Metricon Stadium in the AFL Women's Grand Final. She missed three matches in her debut season to finish with five matches.

Adelaide signed Mules-Robinson for the 2018 season during the trade period in May 2017.

=== Port Adelaide (2022–present) ===
Mules-Robinson signed for the inaugural Port Adelaide Football Club AFLW list in mid-2022.

After serving as stand-in captain in 2024 when Janelle Cuthbertson was injured, Mules-Robinson took over the Port Adelaide captaincy ahead of the 2025 season.

== Personal life ==
Mules-Robinson is queer and is married to Olivia Robinson.

== Statistics ==
Updated to the end of the 2025 season.

Legend
G	Goals	K	Kicks	D	Disposals	T	Tackles
B	Behinds	H	Handballs	M	Marks
#	Played in that season's premiership team

Season	Team	No.	Games	Totals							Averages (per game)							Votes
Season	Team	No.	Games	G	B	K	H	D	M	T	G	B	K	H	D	M	T	Votes
2017^{#}	Adelaide	23	5	0	0	17	17	34	0	26	0.0	0.0	3.4	3.4	6.8	0.0	5.2	0
2018	Adelaide	23	7	0	1	46	23	69	5	31	0.0	0.1	6.6	3.3	9.9	0.7	4.4	0
2019^{#}	Adelaide	23	9	0	1	63	32	95	14	36	0.0	0.1	7.0	3.6	10.6	1.6	4.0	0
2020	Adelaide	23	6	0	0	43	24	67	7	15	0.0	0.0	7.2	4.0	11.2	1.2	2.5	0
2021	Adelaide	23	11	2	2	54	48	102	20	45	0.2	0.2	4.9	4.4	9.3	1.8	4.1	0
2022 (S6)^{#}	Adelaide	23	11	2	0	56	35	91	21	19	0.2	0.0	5.1	3.2	8.3	1.9	1.7	0
2022 (S7)	Port Adelaide	14	9	2	1	43	13	56	10	39	0.2	0.1	4.8	1.4	6.2	1.1	4.3	0
2023	Port Adelaide	14	10	1	1	56	26	82	9	48	0.1	0.1	5.6	2.6	8.2	0.9	4.8	0
2024	Port Adelaide	14	14	4	3	77	34	111	12	56	0.3	0.2	5.5	2.4	7.9	0.9	4.0	1
2025	Port Adelaide	1	12	5	2	83	40	123	19	30	0.4	0.2	6.9	3.3	10.3	1.6	2.5	0
Career			94	16	11	538	292	830	117	345	0.2	0.1	5.7	3.1	8.8	1.2	3.7	1

== Honours and achievements ==
Team

- 3× AFL Women's premiership player (Adelaide): 2017, 2019, S6
- 2× AFL Women's minor premiership (Adelaide): 2021, S6

Individual

- Port Adelaide captain: 2025–present
