= Indy Tahau =

Australian rules footballer

Personal information
- Full name: Indy Tahau
- Born: 22 October 2002 (age 24)
- Original team: South Adelaide (SANFLW)
- Draft: No. 37, 2020 AFL Women's draft
- Debut: Round 4, 2021, Brisbane vs. Adelaide, at Hickey Park
- Height: 176 cm (5 ft 9 in)
- Position: Forward / Defender

Club information
- Current club: Port Adelaide
- Number: 10

Playing career^{1}
Years	Club	Games (Goals)
2021–2022 (S6)	Brisbane	19 (0)
2022 (S7)–	Port Adelaide	26 (30)
Total		45 (30)
- ^{1} Playing statistics correct to the end of the 2025 season.

Career highlights
- AFL Women's Premiership player: 2021; AFL Women's All-Australian team: 2025; AFL Women's leading goalkicker: 2025; Port Adelaide leading goalkicker: 2025

Indy Tahau (born 22 October 2002) is an Australian rules footballer playing for the Port Adelaide Football Club in the AFL Women's competition (AFLW). She previously played for the Brisbane Lions from 2021 to 2022 (Season 6). Tahau won an AFL Women's premiership with Brisbane in 2021, and won the AFL Women's leading goalkicker award playing for Port Adelaide in 2025. Tahau earned her first ever selection in the AFLW All-Australian team in 2025, becoming one of the first players in Port Adelaide's AFLW history to receive this honour.

== Early life ==
Tahau was raised by New Zealand parents in Cunnamulla, Queensland to the age of nine where she played junior rugby league before moving to Adelaide and taking up Australian rules.

== AFL Women's career ==
Tahau was playing for South Adelaide in the SANFL Women's League when Brisbane drafted her with the 37th pick in the 2020 AFL Women's draft.

She made her debut in the Lions' Round 4 game against Adelaide at Hickey Park on 21 February 2021, and at the end of that season played in Brisbane's premiership in just her eighth game of AFLW football.

Ahead of 2022 Season 7, after 19 games with the Lions, she joined new AFLW club Port Adelaide as an expansion signing. Tahau received a Rising Star nomination following a strong performance in Round 10 against the Bombers in Season 7, 2022.

After a breakout season in 2025, Tahau finished third overall in the Port Adelaide Football Clubs Best and Fairest Award for Season 2025. Indy was awarded the Leading Goal Kicker Award for the Port Adelaide Football Club for Season 2025 kicking 25 goals. She also claimed the title of the 2025 AFLW League Leading Goal Kicker with 25 goals and breaking the record for the most number of goals ever kicked in an AFLW season.

Tahau earned her first ever selection in the AFLW All-Australian team in 2025 named in the forward line and becoming one of the first players in Port Adelaide's AFLW history to receive this honour.

== Honours and achievements ==
Team

- AFL Women's premiership player (Brisbane): 2021

Individual

- AFL Women's All-Australian team: 2025
- AFL Women's leading goalkicker: 2025
- Port Adelaide Best and Fairest (Third Place): 2025
- Port Adelaide leading goalkicker: 2025
- Rising Star Nomination (Round 10, Season 7): 2022
