= Lauren Arnell =

Australian rules footballer (born 1987)

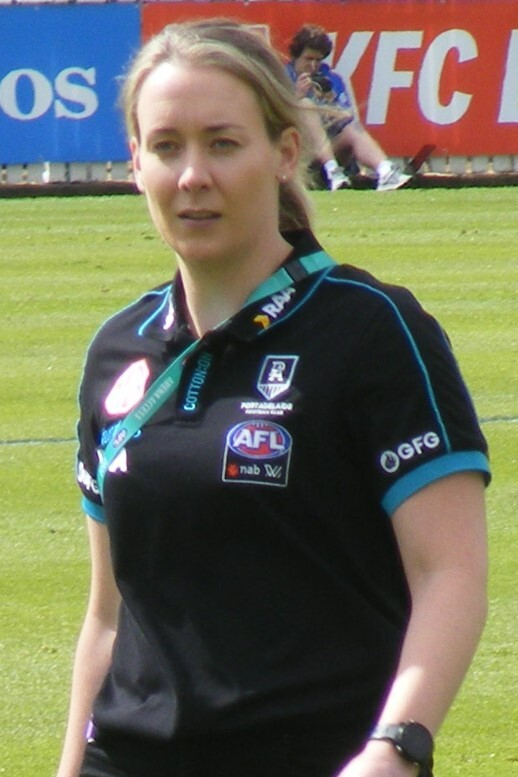
- Lauren Arnell with Port Adelaide in 2022

Personal information
- Full name: Lauren Arnell
- Born: 15 March 1987 (age 39)
- Original team: Darebin (VFLW)
- Draft: 2016 priority signing
- Debut: Round 1, 2017, Carlton vs. Collingwood, at Ikon Park
- Height: 169 cm (5 ft 7 in)
- Position: Midfielder

Playing career
Years	Club	Games (Goals)
2017–2018	Carlton	11 (4)
2019–2021	Brisbane	25 (5)
Total		36 (9)

Representative team honours
Years	Team	Games (Goals)
2017	Victoria	1 (0)

Coaching career
Years	Club	Games (W–L–D)
2022 (S7)–2025	Port Adelaide (W)	46 (18–26–2)

Career highlights
- AFL Women's premiership player: 2021; Carlton captain: 2017

Lauren Arnell (born 15 March 1987) is a former Australian rules footballer and coach. She played for the Carlton Football Club and the Brisbane Lions in the AFL Women's (AFLW) from 2017 to 2021, and was the head AFLW coach of the Port Adelaide Football Club from 2022 season 7 to 2025.

Arnell served as Carlton captain in the inaugural season of the competition in 2017 before moving to Brisbane at the end of the 2018 season, winning a premiership with the club before retiring. She became Port Adelaide's inaugural AFLW coach ahead of its first season in the competition in 2022 season 7, coaching the club to a preliminary final in 2024.

== Early life and state league football ==
Arnell played just one football match as a junior, in a school tournament in her last year of primary school. A talented state-level junior basketballer, Arnell next played football in 2005 while studying to be a teacher in Ballarat.

Arnell first played football competitively for North Ballarat before moving to the Darebin Falcons in the Victorian Women's Football League (VWFL) where she would win nine league premierships through the end of 2016.

In 2010, Arnell was selected as one of forty players to participate in the women's AFL high-performance camp. As part of the program she played in a curtain-raiser exhibition match ahead of the round 12, 2010 AFL match between Melbourne and Collingwood.

She has represented Victoria at the AFL Women's National Championship on six occasions and been selected three times as an All-Australian.

Arnell was drafted by the Western Bulldogs with the twelfth overall pick in the 2013 exhibition series draft. She played for the club in exhibition series matches through the end of 2016.

== AFL Women's playing career ==
=== Carlton ===
Arnell was signed as a priority player by Carlton in August 2016 ahead of the league's inaugural 2017 season. She had previously worked at the club in an off-field role, including in the development of Carlton's bid for a women's team licence. She was named the club's inaugural AFL Women's captain in January 2017. She made her debut in round 1, 2017, in the club and the league's inaugural match at Princes Park against Collingwood.

Carlton signed Arnell for the 2018 season during the trade period in May 2017. She was replaced as captain by Brianna Davey in 2018, instead taking on the role of co-vice captain that season.

=== Brisbane ===
On 28 May 2018, Arnell moved to Brisbane in a three-way deal in which Carlton received pick 40 and Collingwood received Nicole Hildebrand. Ahead of the 2021 AFL Women's season, Arnell made the decision to retire at the end of the season, a decision she announced in April 2021, following Brisbane's 18-point victory over Adelaide to claim the premiership.

== Playing statistics ==
Legend
G	Goals	K	Kicks	D	Disposals	T	Tackles
B	Behinds	H	Handballs	M	Marks

Season	Team	No.	Games	Totals							Averages (per game)						
Season	Team	No.	Games	G	B	K	H	D	M	T	G	B	K	H	D	M	T
2017	Carlton	13	7	2	2	60	24	84	11	26	0.3	0.3	8.6	3.4	12.0	1.6	3.7
2018	Carlton	13	4	2	1	21	6	27	7	10	0.5	0.3	5.3	1.5	6.8	1.8	2.5
2019	Brisbane	16	7	0	0	58	30	88	15	32	0.0	0.0	8.3	4.3	12.6	2.1	4.6
2020	Brisbane	16	7	2	3	49	31	80	16	17	0.3	0.4	7.0	4.4	11.4	2.3	2.4
2021	Brisbane	16	11	3	4	91	39	130	26	31	0.3	0.4	8.3	3.5	11.8	2.4	2.8
Career			36	9	10	279	130	409	75	116	0.3	0.3	7.8	3.6	11.4	2.1	3.2

== AFL Women's coaching career ==
Arnell was appointed as the inaugural coach of Port Adelaide's AFLW side in April 2022, making her the first former AFLW player to become a senior coach. Arnell coached Port Adelaide to an eight-game winning streak and preliminary final in the 2024 season and finished with a 18-26 win-loss record over her four seasons as coach. She resigned from the position in January 2026.

== Coaching statistics ==
Statistics are correct to the end of the 2025 season

Legend
W	Wins	L	Losses	D	Draws	W%	Winning percentage	LP	Ladder position	LT	League teams

Season	Team	Games	W	L	D	W %	LP	LT
2022 (S7)	Port Adelaide	10	1	8	1	10.0%	17	18
2023	Port Adelaide	10	2	7	1	20.0%	15	18
2024	Port Adelaide	14	9	5	0	64.3%	4	18
2025	Port Adelaide	12	6	6	0	50.0%	10	18
Career totals		46	18	26	2	36.0%		

== Personal life ==
Arnell grew up on a cattle farm in the Victorian town of Clarkefield, 46 kilometres northwest of Melbourne. She spent her later teenage years in Lakes Entrance in the state's east. She is one of a set of triplets.

Arnell studied physical education teaching at the University of Ballarat and has previously worked as a school teacher.

She is the niece of former Footscray player, Ray Walker.

In July 2023, Arnell and her partner Lexi announced that Arnell was pregnant.

Off-field Arnell works as AFL Victoria's education and training manager.
