= Hugh Jackson (footballer) =

Australian rules footballer (born 2003)

Personal information
- Born: 3 May 2003 (age 23)
- Original team: Crystal Brook/Rostrevor College/North Adelaide
- Draft: No. 55, 2021 AFL draft
- Debut: Round 11, 2025, Port Adelaide vs. Fremantle, at Perth Stadium
- Height: 182 cm (6 ft 0 in)
- Position: Midfielder

Playing career
Years	Club	Games (Goals)
2022–2025	Port Adelaide	9 (1)

Hugh Jackson (born 3 May 2003) is a former professional Australian rules footballer who played for the Port Adelaide Football Club in the Australian Football League (AFL).

== Junior career ==
Jackson played junior football for Crystal Brook Football Club in the Northern Areas Football Association and North Adelaide in the SANFL U18s, where he averaged 29.3 disposals in 2021.

== AFL career ==
Jackson was selected with pick 55 of the 2021 AFL draft by the Port Adelaide Football Club. He underwent hip surgery during his first pre-season following being drafted.

In September 2023, Jackson signed a contract to with Port Adelaide to the end of 2025. He made his AFL debut in round 11 of the 2025 AFL season against Fremantle.

Jackson was delisted by Port Adelaide at the end of the 2025 AFL season.

== Statistics ==
Legend
G	Goals	K	Kicks	D	Disposals	T	Tackles
B	Behinds	H	Handballs	M	Marks

Season	Team	No.	Games	Totals							Averages (per game)							Votes
Season	Team	No.	Games	G	B	K	H	D	M	T	G	B	K	H	D	M	T	Votes
2022	Port Adelaide	39	0	—	—	—	—	—	—	—	—	—	—	—	—	—	—	0
2023	Port Adelaide	39	0	—	—	—	—	—	—	—	—	—	—	—	—	—	—	0
2024	Port Adelaide	39	0	—	—	—	—	—	—	—	—	—	—	—	—	—	—	0
2025	Port Adelaide	39	9	1	1	43	41	84	12	15	0.1	0.1	4.8	4.6	9.3	1.3	1.7	0
Career			9	1	1	43	41	84	12	15	0.1	0.1	4.8	4.6	9.3	1.3	1.7	0
