= Mitch Georgiades =

Australian rules footballer (born 2001)

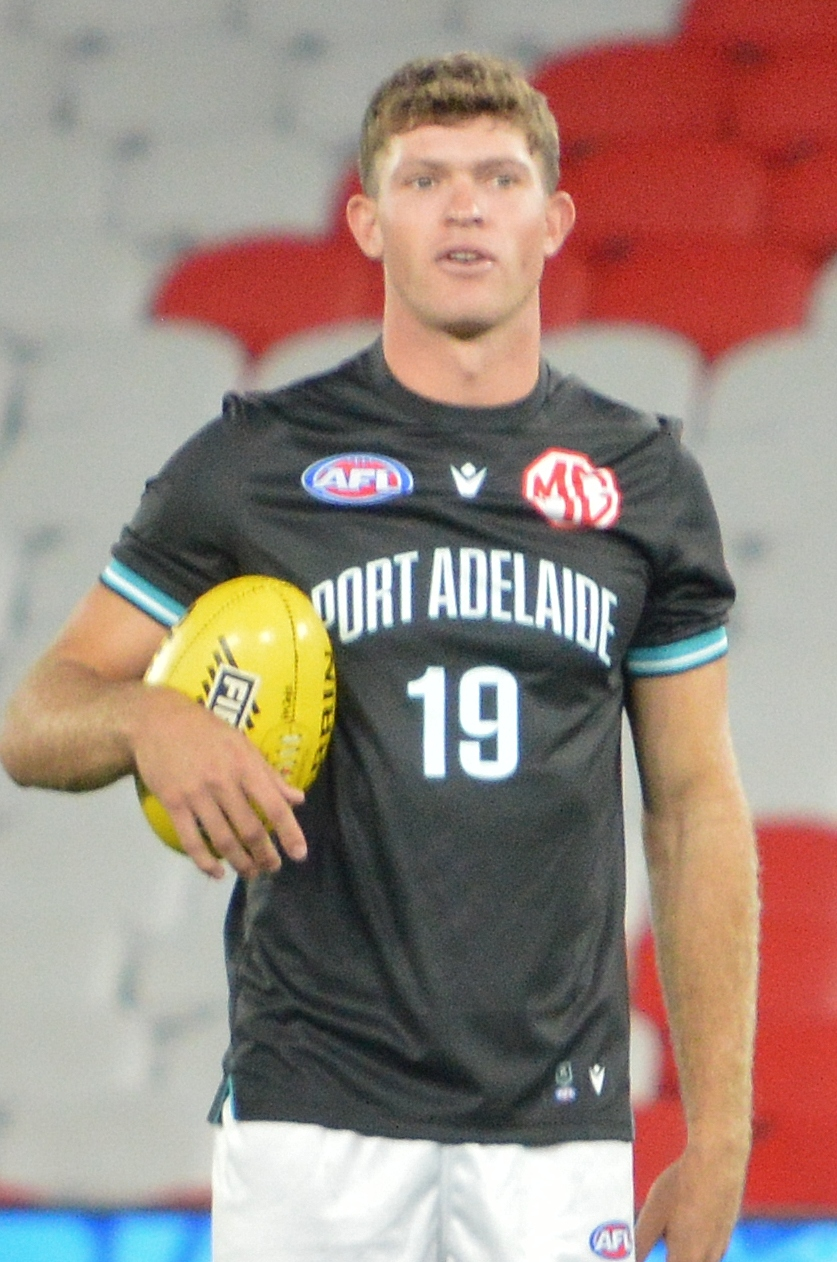
- Georgiades in March 2026

Personal information
- Full name: Mitchell John Georgiades
- Born: 28 September 2001 (age 25)
- Original team: Subiaco (WAFL)/Hale School (PSA)
- Draft: No. 18, 2019 national draft
- Height: 192 cm (6 ft 4 in)
- Weight: 88 kg (194 lb)
- Position: Key Forward

Club information
- Current club: Port Adelaide
- Number: 19

Playing career^{1}
Years	Club	Games (Goals)
2020–	Port Adelaide	113 (218)

Representative team honours
Years	Team	Games (Goals)
2026	Western Australia	1 (0)
- ^{1} Playing statistics correct to the end of the 2026 season.

Career highlights
- Mark of the Year: 2022; 3× Port Adelaide leading goalkicker: 2024, 2025, 2026; 2× AFL Rising Star nominee: 2020, 2021; Gavin Wanganeen Medal: 2021

Mitchell John Georgiades (/dʒɔːdʒiːˈɑːdəs/ jaw-jee-AH-dəs; born 28 September 2001) is an Australian rules footballer who plays for Port Adelaide in the Australian Football League (AFL).

== Early life ==
Georgiades started his junior football with the Wembley Downs Football Club in Perth before joining Subiaco in the West Australian Football League (WAFL) where he led the side in a two-point Grand Final win over Swan Districts in the 2018 WAFL Colts premiership. That year, he represented Western Australia in all four AFL Under 18 Championships matches, averaging 10 disposals and four marks.

== AFL career ==
Georgiades joined Port Adelaide for the 2019 AFL season but did not play after suffering a quad injury in the under-17 NAB All Stars game on Grand Final day the previous year.

Georgiades made his AFL debut in round 1 of the 2020 season against Gold Coast, kicking two goals. After a three-goal outing against Melbourne in round 9, he was awarded an AFL Rising Star nomination. In round 5 of the 2021 season, he received another nomination for AFL Rising Star.

In 2022, Georgiades was the AFL's Mark of the Year for his round 16 mark against Fremantle.

On 24 April 2023, Georgiades was ruled out for the rest of the season after he ruptured the anterior cruciate ligament in his right knee during a SANFL game.

In the 2024 AFL season, Georgiades played 20 games for Port Adelaide and kicked a career-high 44 goals.

== Personal life ==
Georgiades' father, John, played 103 games for WAFL club Subiaco and 15 games for Victorian Football League (VFL) club Footscray.

== Statistics ==
Updated to the end of round 22, 2026.

Legend
G	Goals	K	Kicks	D	Disposals	T	Tackles
B	Behinds	H	Handballs	M	Marks

Season	Team	No.	Games	Totals							Averages (per game)							Votes
Season	Team	No.	Games	G	B	K	H	D	M	T	G	B	K	H	D	M	T	Votes
2020 (Note: The 2020 season was played with 17 home-and-away matches per team (down from 22) and 16-minute quarters with time on (down from 20-minute quarters with time on) due to the impact of the COVID-19 pandemic.)	Port Adelaide	19	7	8	6	39	19	58	20	14	1.1	0.9	5.6	2.7	8.3	2.9	2.0	1
2021	Port Adelaide	19	21	32	17	134	76	210	93	37	1.5	0.8	6.4	3.6	10.0	4.4	1.8	1
2022	Port Adelaide	19	19	23	24	118	85	203	90	40	1.2	1.3	6.2	4.5	10.7	4.7	2.1	0
2023	Port Adelaide	19	2	2	5	18	9	27	12	2	1.0	2.5	9.0	4.5	13.5	6.0	1.0	0
2024	Port Adelaide	19	20	44	27	142	75	217	107	33	2.2	1.4	7.1	3.8	10.9	5.4	1.7	1
2025	Port Adelaide	19	23	58	42	203	75	278	126	28	2.5	1.8	8.8	3.3	12.1	5.5	1.2	5
2026	Port Adelaide	19	19	42	46	165	65	230	121	23	2.2	2.4	8.7	3.4	12.1	6.4	1.2	0
Career			111	209	167	819	404	1223	569	177	1.9	1.5	7.4	3.6	11.0	5.1	1.6	8
