= Bruce Weber (administrator) =

Bruce Weber (14 May 1951 – 13 April 2006) was an Australian rules football administrator with the Port Adelaide Football Club.

Born in Port Adelaide, South Australia, Weber played junior football with South Australian National Football League (SANFL) club Port Adelaide before becoming president of Port Adelaide Football Club from 1986 to 1992.

In this role, Weber led a charge for the club to receive a licence in the Australian Football League (AFL). In 1990 this move almost came to fruition but for the formation of a new South Australian club, the Adelaide Football Club, to receive the licence and enter the AFL in 1991.

Weber was succeeded by Greg Boulton as president/chairman in 1993, with the Port Adelaide Football Club eventually entering the AFL in 1997. It is considered that Weber's initial vision during his time as president led to this outcome.

Weber died in Jakarta, Indonesia on 13 April 2006, survived by his wife Keke, daughters Jodie, Rachel and Stacy and stepson Juahir.
