= Ebony O'Dea =

Australian rules footballer

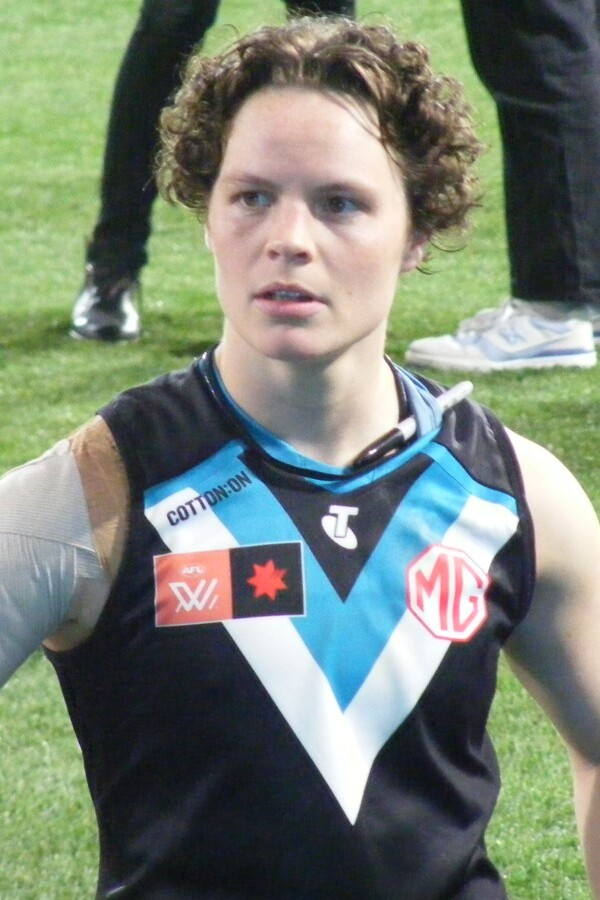
- Ebony O'Dea in 2022

Personal information
- Full name: Ebony O'Dea
- Nickname: Ebs
- Born: 15 November 1998 (age 27); Springton, South Australia
- Original team: Norwood (SANFLW)
- Draft: No. 71, 2018 national draft No. 89, 2019 national draft
- Debut: Round 2, 2020, Collingwood vs. Carlton, at Ikon Park
- Height: 167 cm (5 ft 6 in)
- Position: Defender / Midfielder

Club information
- Current club: Port Adelaide
- Number: 2

Playing career^{1}
Years	Club	Games (Goals)
2019	Greater Western Sydney	0 (0)
2020–2022 (S6)	Collingwood	21 (1)
2022 (S7)–	Port Adelaide	20 (1)
Total		41 (2)
- ^{1} Playing statistics correct to the end of the 2023 season.

Ebony O'Dea (born 15 November 1998) is an Australian rules footballer who plays for Port Adelaide in the AFL Women's (AFLW). She has previously been listed with Greater Western Sydney (GWS) and Collingwood. After being picked by GWS in the 2018 national draft, she was delisted after one season. She was re-drafted by Collingwood in the 2019 national draft and made her league debut in round 2 of the 2020 season, before moving to Port Adelaide ahead of 2022 season 7.

== Personal life ==
O'Dea grew up in Springton, South Australia. In Year 12 she studied chemistry the University of Adelaide, travelling in from her town, and started playing football there. She played a key role, helping the university reach the SAWFL Grand Final. As well as football, she is accomplished at unicycling, holding the World Record in Unicycling for "Platform Long Jump" and the Australian women's record for "Platform High Jump".

== State football ==
O'Dea played for South Australian National Football League club Norwood under coach Stephen Symonds. With Norwood she won the premiership in the 2017 season and was named amongst the best players in the 2018 Grand Final.

== AFL Women's career ==
=== Greater Western Sydney ===
O'Dea was drafted by Greater Western Sydney with pick 71. At the end of the season she was delisted after not making an appearance for the club. After her delisting she was selected for Greater Western Sydney's inaugural VFL Women's squad, together with five more recently delisted players, so as to strengthen their chances to be re-drafted. This squad played only invitational games not counted for points or ladder position during teams' bye rounds.

=== Collingwood ===
The following season O'Dea was drafted by Collingwood with pick 89, re-joining coach Symonds who was her coach when she played at Norwood. She made her debut in round 2, 2020, in a match at Ikon Park against Carlton. In May 2022, she left Collingwood to return to her home state, South Australia.

=== Port Adelaide ===
O'Dea signed for Port Adelaide as one of the team's expansion signings ahead of their inaugural season in 2022 season 7.

== Statistics ==
Statistics are correct to the end of the 2022 (S6) season.

Legend
G	Goals	K	Kicks	D	Disposals	T	Tackles
B	Behinds	H	Handballs	M	Marks

Season	Team	No.	Games	Totals							Averages (per game)						
Season	Team	No.	Games	G	B	K	H	D	M	T	G	B	K	H	D	M	T
2019	Greater Western Sydney	20	0	—	—	—	—	—	—	—	—	—	—	—	—	—	—
2020	Collingwood	50	4	0	0	7	16	23	0	24	0.0	0.0	1.8	4.0	5.8	0.0	6.0
2021	Collingwood	50	10	0	0	29	48	77	9	26	0.0	0.0	2.9	4.8	7.7	0.9	2.6
2022 (S6)	Collingwood	50	7	1	0	22	30	52	5	17	0.1	0.0	3.1	4.3	7.4	0.7	2.4
Career			21	1	0	58	94	152	14	67	0.1	0.0	2.8	4.5	7.2	0.7	3.2
