= Bob Clayton (footballer) =

Australian rules footballer

Playing career
Years	Club	Games (Goals)
1966–1975	Port Adelaide	151 (4)

Career highlights
- Port Adelaide Hall of Fame inductee (2018)

Bob Clayton was an Australian rules footballer and administrator for Port Adelaide.

Port Adelaide's entry into the Australian Football League (AFL) is partially due to the efforts of Bob Clayton during his time as General Manager when the club made its first official bid in 1990. He was also Football Manager when the clubs entry into the AFL was later confirmed.
