= Gemma Houghton =

Australian rules footballer

- Houghton playing for Port Adelaide in 2026

Personal information
- Full name: Gemma Maree Houghton
- Born: 31 December 1993 (age 32); Busselton, Western Australia
- Draft: 2016 free agent: Fremantle
- Debut: Round 1, 2017, Fremantle vs. Western Bulldogs, at VU Whitten Oval
- Height: 179 cm (5 ft 10 in)
- Position: Forward

Club information
- Current club: Port Adelaide
- Number: 27

Playing career^{1}
Years	Club	Games (Goals)
2017–2022 (S6)	Fremantle	46 (40)
2022 (S7)–	Port Adelaide	52 (68)
Total		98 (108)
- ^{1} Playing statistics correct to the end of the 2026 season.

Career highlights
- AFL Women's All-Australian team: 2019, 2020; 2× Fremantle leading goalkicker: 2019, 2021; 4× Port Adelaide leading goalkicker: 2022 (S7), 2023, 2024, 2026; Inaugural Port Adelaide player

Gemma Maree Houghton (born 31 December 1993) is an Australian rules footballer playing for the Port Adelaide Football Club in the AFL Women's competition. Houghton was recruited by Fremantle as a free agent in October 2016. She had never played Aussie Rules before, having been found through a talent search open to all athletes. She previously played high level basketball.

== AFL Women's career ==
Houghton made her debut for Fremantle in a thirty-two point loss to the Western Bulldogs at VU Whitten Oval in the opening round of the 2017 season. She played all seven matches in her debut season.

Playing for the Swan Districts Football Club in the 2018 WAFL Women's competition, Houghton won the Mandy McSherry Medal, the teams best and fairest award.

After only playing two games in 2018, Houghton played in all eight of Fremantle's games in 2019, kicking 9 goals to be the club's leading goalkicker. Her athleticism and strong marking was recognised with selection in the 2019 and 2020 AFL Women's All-Australian teams. The 2020 AFL Women's season saw Houghton obtain her second AFL Women's All-Australian team selection, named in the half forward position.

On 10 May 2022, Houghton signed with expansion club Port Adelaide for 2022 AFL Women's season 7 and scored their inaugural goal in Round 1. She has been the leading goalkicker in each of Port's first three seasons. In the final round of the 2025 AFL Women's season, Houghton became the first woman to kick 100 career goals in the AFLW when she scored her fourth goal for the game after the final siren.

== Personal life ==
Her brother Joel Houghton was drafted by Fremantle in the 2009 AFL draft, but did not play an AFL game. He played for Perth, Swan Districts and East Perth in the West Australian Football League (WAFL).

Houghton joined the AFLW Competition Committee in 2025 and is also on the AFL Players Association's Indigenous Advisory Board. She is of Indigenous Australian descent (Yindjibarndi).

She is an advocate for athletes seeking help with mental health issues, after losing a close friend to suicide in 2021.

== Statistics ==
Statistics are correct to the end of the 2021 season.

Legend
G	Goals	K	Kicks	D	Disposals	T	Tackles
B	Behinds	H	Handballs	M	Marks

Season	Team	No.	Games	Totals							Averages (per game)							Votes
Season	Team	No.	Games	G	B	K	H	D	M	T	G	B	K	H	D	M	T	Votes
2017	Fremantle	27	7	3	5	36	26	62	11	28	0.4	0.7	5.1	3.7	8.9	1.6	4.0	0
2018	Fremantle	27	2	0	0	4	0	4	3	4	0.0	0.0	2.0	0.0	2.0	1.5	2.0	0
2019	Fremantle	27	8	9	8	51	22	73	25	35	1.1	1.0	6.4	2.8	9.1	3.1	4.4	3
2020	Fremantle	27	7	4	10	54	24	78	26	20	0.6	1.4	7.7	3.4	11.1	3.7	2.9	2
2021	Fremantle	27	10	15	8	73	35	108	27	26	1.5	0.8	7.3	3.5	10.8	2.7	2.6	8
Career			34	31	31	218	107	325	92	113	0.9	0.9	6.4	3.1	9.6	2.7	3.3	13
