= 2020 Port Adelaide Football Club season =

Port Adelaide Football Club
2020 season
- President: David Koch
- Coach: Ken Hinkley
- Captain: Tom Jonas
- Home ground: Adelaide Oval
- Regular season: 1st (4th minor premiership)
- Finals Series: 3rd (Preliminary Final)

The 2020 Port Adelaide Football Club season was the club's 24th season in the Australian Football League (AFL) and the 150th year since its inception in 1870. The club would ordinarily have fielded its reserves team in the South Australian National Football League (SANFL), though was prevented from doing so as a result of the COVID-19 pandemic.

== Squad ==
=== AFL ===
Port Adelaide Football Club
Senior list		Rookie list	Coaching staff
1 Tom Jonas (c); 2 Sam Powell-Pepper; 3 Ryan Burton; 4 Todd Marshall; 5 Dan Houston; 6 Steven Motlop; 7 Brad Ebert; 8 Hamish Hartlett (vc); 9 Robbie Gray; 10 Travis Boak; 11 Tom Rockliff; 12 Trent McKenzie; 13 Wylie Buzza; 14 Miles Bergman; 15 Karl Amon; 16 Ollie Wines (vc); 17 Tom Clurey; 18 Zak Butters; 19 Mitch Georgiades	20 Connor Rozee; 21 Xavier Duursma; 22 Charlie Dixon; 23 Jack Watts; 24 Kane Farrell; 25 Sam Hayes; 26 Riley Bonner; 27 Joel Garner; 28 Willem Drew; 29 Scott Lycett; 30 Joe Atley; 32 Sam Mayes; 33 Darcy Byrne-Jones; 34 Dylan Williams; 37 Jake Patmore; 38 Peter Ladhams; 39 Justin Westhoff; 40 Jarrod Lienert; 44 Jackson Mead	31 Trent Burgoyne; 36 Boyd Woodcock; 41 Riley Grundy; 45 Martin Frederick (B); 47 Tobin Cox; 48 Jake Pasini; 50 Cameron Sutcliffe	Head coach: Ken Hinkley; Assistant coaches: Michael Voss (senior assistant); Brett Montgomery (defence); Jarrad Schofield (midfield); Nathan Bassett (forwards); Trent Hentschel (defence development); Scott Thompson (midfield development); Chad Cornes (forwards development); Dean Brogan (ruck); Matthew Lokan (SANFL coach); Paul Stewart (NGA, player welfare and development); Legend: (c) Captain(s); (vc) Vice-captain(s); (B) Category B rookie; italics - Inactive player list; Long-term injury; (ret.) Retired; Updated: Source(s): Playing list, Coaching staff

=== SANFL ===
Port Adelaide SANFL squad
SANFL list		Coaching Staff
9 Matt Appleton; 42 Tom Corcoran; 43 Jack Strange; 33 Mitchell Mead; 3 Adam Mahney; 10 Sam Davidson	49 Simon Wong; 50 Jack Elsworthy; 29 Dallas Hill; 7 Levi Proude; 4 Ben Edwards; 2 Mony Makoi; 11 Lachlan Smith; Tyson Goldsack	Head coach: Matthew Lokan; Legend: (c) Captain(s); (vc) Vice-captain(s); Updated: 28 November 2019; Source(s): Playing list

== AFL season ==
=== Pre-season ===
**Rd**	**Date and local time**	**Opponent**	**Scores** (Port Adelaide's scores indicated in **bold**)			**Venue**	**Attendance**	**Ref.**
**Rd**	**Date and local time**	**Opponent**	Home	Away	Result	**Venue**	**Attendance**	**Ref.**
1	Sunday, 23 February (3:10 pm)	Brisbane Lions	12.5 (77)	**14.14 (98)**	Won by 21 points	Moreton Bay Sports Complex (A)	2,027	
2	Saturday, 7 March (3:40 pm)	Western Bulldogs	**14.11 (95)**	13.7 (85)	Won by 10 points	Bennett Oval (H)	4,770	

=== Regular season ===
- Due to the COVID-19 pandemic, the AFL reduced the season to 17 rounds and played some matches behind closed doors.

**Rd**	**Date and time**	**Opponent**	**Scores** (Port Adelaide's scores indicated in **bold**)			**Venue**	**Attendance**	**Ladder**	**Ref.**
**Rd**	**Date and time**	**Opponent**	Home	Away	Result	**Venue**	**Attendance**	**Ladder**	**Ref.**
1	Saturday, 21 March (6:25 pm)	Gold Coast	4.5 (29)	**10.16 (76)**	Won by 57 points	Metricon Stadium (A)	0	1st	
2	Saturday, 13 June (7:10 pm)	Adelaide	**17.8 (110)**	5.5 (35)	Won by 75 points	Adelaide Oval (H)	2,240 (Note: Capped stadium capacity.)	1st	
3	Sunday, 21 June (5:35 pm)	Fremantle	6.5 (41)	**10.10 (70)**	Won by 29 points	Metricon Stadium (A)	180	1st	
4	Saturday, 27 June (1:15 pm)	West Coast	**13.11 (89)**	6.5 (41)	Won by 48 points	Metricon Stadium (H)	450	1st	
5	Saturday, 4 July (7:10 pm)	Brisbane Lions	12.13 (85)	**6.12 (48)**	Lost by 37 points	Gabba (A)	10,161	1st	
6	Sunday, 12 July (1:05 pm)	Greater Western Sydney	**9.9 (63)**	6.10 (46)	Won by 17 points	Metricon Stadium (H)	368	1st	
7	Sunday, 19 July (1:05 pm)	Carlton	9.7 (61)	**9.10 (64)**	Won by 3 points	Gabba (A)	3,510	1st	
8	Saturday, 25 July (7:40 pm)	St Kilda	**6.8 (44)**	12.1 (73)	Lost by 29 points	Adelaide Oval (H)	16,727	1st	
9	Thursday, 30 July (8:10 pm)	Melbourne	4.8 (32)	**12.11 (83)**	Won by 51 points	Gabba (A)	323	1st	
10	Monday, 3 August (6:40 pm)	Western Bulldogs	**8.7 (55)**	5.12 (42)	Won by 13 points	Adelaide Oval (H)	14,159	1st	
11	Saturday, 8 August (4:05 pm)	Richmond	**13.15 (93)**	11.6 (72)	Won by 21 points	Adelaide Oval (H)	10,256	1st	
12	Friday, 14 August (7:50 pm)	Geelong	14.7 (91)	**4.7 (31)**	Lost by 60 points	Metricon Stadium (A)	3,378	1st	
13	Saturday, 22 August (4:05 pm)	Hawthorn	**9.14 (68)**	9.4 (58)	Won by 10 points	Adelaide Oval (H)	11,740	1st	
14	Saturday, 29 August (1:15 pm)	Sydney	**11.7 (73)**	7.5 (47)	Won by 26 points	Adelaide Oval (H)	11,801	1st	
15	Bye							1st	
16	Saturday, 5 September (7:40 pm)	North Melbourne	6.6 (42)	**11.12 (78)**	Won by 36 points	Metricon Stadium (A)	592	1st	
17	Saturday 12 September (4:05 pm)	Essendon	**11.13 (79)**	4.5 (29)	Won by 50 points	Adelaide Oval (H)	17,482	1st	
18	Monday, 21 September (7:15 pm)	Collingwood	7.3 (45)	**9.7 (61)**	Won by 16 points	Gabba (A)	5,424	1st	

=== Ladder ===
Pos	Team	Pld	W	L	D	PF	PA	PP	Pts	Qualification
**1**	Port Adelaide	**17**	**14**	**3**	**0**	**1185**	**869**	**136.4**	56	Finals series
2	Brisbane Lions	17	14	3	0	1184	948	124.9	56	Finals series
3	Richmond (P)	17	12	4	1	1135	874	129.9	50	Finals series
4	Geelong	17	12	5	0	1233	901	136.8	48	Finals series
5	West Coast	17	12	5	0	1095	936	117.0	48	Finals series
6	St Kilda	17	10	7	0	1159	997	116.2	40	Finals series
7	Western Bulldogs	17	10	7	0	1103	1034	106.7	40	Finals series
8	Collingwood	17	9	7	1	965	881	109.5	38	Finals series
9	Melbourne	17	9	8	0	1063	986	107.8	36	
10	Greater Western Sydney	17	8	9	0	1007	1053	95.6	32	
11	Carlton	17	7	10	0	1017	1078	94.3	28	
12	Fremantle	17	7	10	0	866	924	93.7	28	
13	Essendon	17	6	10	1	938	1185	79.2	26	
14	Gold Coast	17	5	11	1	996	1099	90.6	22	
15	Hawthorn	17	5	12	0	1004	1194	84.1	20	
16	Sydney	17	5	12	0	890	1077	82.6	20	
17	North Melbourne	17	3	14	0	858	1205	71.2	12	
18	Adelaide	17	3	14	0	826	1283	64.4	12	

Updated to match(es) played on 21 September 2020. Source: AFL
Rules for classification: 1) points; 2) percentage; 3) number of points for.
(P) Premiers

=== Finals series ===
**Final**	**Date and time**	**Opponent**	**Scores** (Port Adelaide's scores indicated in **bold**)			**Venue**	**Attendance**	**Ref.**
**Final**	**Date and time**	**Opponent**	Home	Away	Result	**Venue**	**Attendance**	**Ref.**
Qualifying Final	Thursday, 1 October (7:10 pm)	Geelong	**9.4 (58)**	5.12 (42)	Won by 16 points	Adelaide Oval (H)	22,755	
Semi Final	Bye							
Preliminary Final	Friday, 16 October (7:20 pm)	Richmond	**6.4 (40)**	6.10 (46)	Lost by 6 points	Adelaide Oval (H)	24,292	

== SANFL season (cancelled) ==
Port Adelaide's reserves team, known as the Magpies, had been fixtured for another season in the SANFL. In May 2020 however the AFL ordered all AFL-listed players not to play in any state league, preventing Port Adelaide from fielding their SANFL team for the 2020 season.

== Awards ==
=== Power (AFL) ===
- John Cahill Medal – Darcy Byrne-Jones
- Fos Williams Medal – Travis Boak
- Gavin Wanganeen Award – Zak Butters
- Coaches’ Award – Trent McKenzie
- John McCarthy Award – Justin Westhoff
