= 2021 Port Adelaide Football Club season =

Port Adelaide Football Club
2021 season
- President: David Koch
- Coach: Ken Hinkley (AFL); Matthew Lokan (SANFL)
- Captains: Tom Jonas (AFL); Cameron Sutcliffe (SANFL)
- Home ground: Adelaide Oval (AFL); Alberton Oval (SANFL)
- Regular season: 2nd (AFL); 7th (SANFL)
- Finals series: Preliminary Final (AFL); DNQ (SANFL)
- Best and Fairest: Ollie Wines (AFL); Sam Hayes (SANFL)
- Club membership: 56,532

The 2021 Port Adelaide Football Club season was the club's 25th season in the Australian Football League (AFL) and the 151st year since its inception in 1870. The club also fielded its reserves team in the South Australian National Football League (SANFL), having rejoined the competition after missing the previous season due to the COVID-19 pandemic.

== Squad ==
=== AFL ===
Port Adelaide Football Club
Senior list		Rookie list	Coaching staff
1 Tom Jonas (c); 2 Sam Powell-Pepper; 3 Ryan Burton; 4 Todd Marshall; 5 Dan Houston; 6 Steven Motlop; 7 Xavier Duursma; 8 Hamish Hartlett (vc); 9 Robbie Gray; 10 Travis Boak; 11 Tom Rockliff; 12 Trent McKenzie; 13 Orazio Fantasia; 14 Miles Bergman; 15 Karl Amon; 16 Ollie Wines (vc); 17 Tom Clurey; 18 Zak Butters	19 Mitch Georgiades; 20 Connor Rozee; 21 Aliir Aliir; 22 Charlie Dixon; 23 Dylan Williams; 24 Kane Farrell; 25 Sam Hayes; 26 Riley Bonner; 27 Joel Garner; 28 Willem Drew; 29 Scott Lycett; 30 Ollie Lord; 32 Sam Mayes; 33 Darcy Byrne-Jones; 34 Lachie Jones; 38 Peter Ladhams; 40 Jarrod Lienert; 44 Jackson Mead	31 Trent Burgoyne; 36 Boyd Woodcock; 37 Taj Schofield; 45 Martin Frederick (B); 48 Jake Pasini; 50 Tyson Goldsack	Head coach: Ken Hinkley; Assistant coaches: Michael Voss (senior assistant); Brett Montgomery (defence); Jarrad Schofield (midfield); Nathan Bassett (forwards); Trent Hentschel (defence development); Chad Cornes (forwards development); Dean Brogan (ruck); Matthew Lokan (SANFL coach); Paul Stewart (NGA, player welfare and development); Legend: (c) Captain(s); (vc) Vice-captain(s); (B) Category B rookie; italics - Inactive player list; Long-term injury; (ret.) Retired; Updated: 1 March 2026; Source(s): Playing list, Coaching staff

=== SANFL ===
Port Adelaide SANFL squad
SANFL list (Note: Port Adelaide AFL-listed players (not selected to play AFL) are allowed to play for the SANFL squad.)		Coaching Staff
Cameron Sutcliffe; Dylan Aldridge; Matthew Appleton; Tom Corcoran; Sean Samblich; Luke Surman; Jake Weidmann; Jake Westbrook	Miller Carter; Ben Edwards; Owen Montgomery; Ethan Moore; Aryan Sareen; Jake Strange; Campbell Wildman; Simon Wong; Jace Bode	Head coach: Matthew Lokan; Assistant coaches: Chad Cornes; Trent Hentschel; Legend: (c) Captain(s); (vc) Vice-captain(s); Updated: 15 January 2021; Source(s):

== AFL season ==
=== Pre-season ===
**Date and time**	**Opponent**	**Scores** (Port Adelaide's scores indicated in **bold**)			**Venue**	**Attendance**	**Ref.**
**Date and time**	**Opponent**	Home	Away	Result	**Venue**	**Attendance**	**Ref.**
Saturday, 27 February (11:00 am)	Adelaide	**18.17 (125)**	11.7 (73)	Won by 52 points	Alberton Oval (H)	0	
Sunday, 7 March (3:40 pm)	Adelaide	6.9 (45)	**17.14 (116)**	Won by 71 points	Flinders University Stadium (A)	3,028	

=== Regular season ===
**Rd**	**Date and time**	**Opponent**	**Scores** (Port Adelaide's scores indicated in **bold**)			**Venue**	**Attendance**	**Ladder**	**Ref.**
**Rd**	**Date and time**	**Opponent**	Home	Away	Result	**Venue**	**Attendance**	**Ladder**	**Ref.**
1	Sunday, 21 March (1:10 pm)	North Melbourne	9.11 (65)	**17.15 (117)**	Won by 52 points	Marvel Stadium (A)	13,050	1st	
2	Saturday, 27 March (4:35 pm)	Essendon	**18.11 (119)**	9.11 (65)	Won by 54 points	Adelaide Oval (H)	29,978	1st	
3	Saturday, 3 April (5:10 pm)	West Coast	16.12 (108)	**11.5 (71)**	Lost by 37 points	Optus Stadium (A)	42,090	4th	
4	Friday, 9 April (7:10 pm)	Richmond	**11.13 (79)**	11.11 (77)	Won by 2 points	Adelaide Oval (H)	33,742	4th	
5	Saturday, 17 April (7:25 pm)	Carlton	9.14 (68)	**15.6 (96)**	Won by 28 points	Melbourne Cricket Ground (A)	32,893	4th	
6	Sunday, 25 April (6:10 pm)	St Kilda	**14.9 (93)**	5.9 (39)	Won by 54 points	Adelaide Oval (H)	33,125	3rd	
7	Saturday, 1 May (7:25 pm)	Brisbane Lions	5.14 (44)	**13.15 (93)**	Lost by 49 points	Gabba (A)	20,007	3rd	
8	Saturday, 8 May (7:10 pm)	Adelaide	**5.8 (38)**	12.15 (87)	Won by 49 points	Adelaide Oval (H)	43,069	3rd	
9	Saturday, 15 May (7:10 pm)	Western Bulldogs	**15.6 (96)**	12.5 (77)	Lost by 19 points	Adelaide Oval (H)	32,787	5th	
10	Sunday, 23 May (3:20 pm)	Collingwood	8.10 (58)	**8.11 (59)**	Won by 1 points	Melbourne Cricket Ground (A)	23,415	5th	
11	Saturday, 29 May (2:10 pm)	Fremantle	**18.7 (115)**	9.15 (69)	Won by 46 points	Adelaide Oval (H)	26,759	5th	
12	Bye							5th	
13	Thursday, 10 June (7:10 pm)	Geelong	**14.7 (91)**	17.10 (112)	Lost by 21 points	Adelaide Oval (H)	28,718	5th	
14	Saturday, 19 June (1:45 pm)	Gold Coast	4.7 (31)	**12.9 (81)**	Won by 50 points	Metricon Stadium (A)	7,117	5th	
15	Saturday, 26 June (7:10 pm)	Sydney	**12.9 (81)**	10.11 (71)	Won by 10 points	Adelaide Oval (H)	29,631	4th	
16	Saturday, 3 July (7:40 pm)	Hawthorn	7.11 (53)	**13.9 (87)**	Won by 34 points	Marvel Stadium (A)	18,251	4th	
17	Thursday, 8 July (7:10 pm)	Melbourne	**8.7 (55)**	12.14 (86)	Lost by 31 points	Adelaide Oval (H)	30,908	5th	
18	Saturday, 17 July (1:45 pm)	St Kilda	8.13 (61)	**10.14 (74)**	Won by 13 points	Marvel Stadium (A)	0 (BCD)	5th	
19	Friday, 23 July (7:10 pm)	Collingwood	**14.13 (97)**	10.9 (69)	Won by 28 points	Marvel Stadium (H)	0 (BCD)	4th	
20	Sunday, 1 August (6:10 pm)	Greater Western Sydney	11.7 (73)	**15.10 (100)**	Won by 27 points	Marvel Stadium (A)	0 (BCD)	4th	
21	Saturday, 7 August (7:10 pm)	Adelaide	7.9 (51)	**7.13 (55)**	Won by 4 points	Adelaide Oval (A)	14,376	4th	
22	Saturday, 14 August (4:05 pm)	Carlton	**21.14 (140)**	5.15 (45)	Won by 95 points	Adelaide Oval (H)	13,943	3rd	
23	Friday, 20 August (7:50 pm)	Western Bulldogs	10.4 (64)	**9.12 (66)**	Won by 2 points	Marvel Stadium (A)	0 (BCD)	2nd	

=== Finals series ===
**Round**	**Date and time**	**Opponent**	**Scores** (Port Adelaide's scores indicated in **bold**)			**Venue**	**Attendance**	**Ref.**
**Round**	**Date and time**	**Opponent**	Home	Away	Result	**Venue**	**Attendance**	**Ref.**
Qualifying Final	Friday, 27 August (7:20 pm)	Geelong	**12.14 (86)**	5.13 (43)	Won by 43 points	Adelaide Oval (H)	19,712	
Preliminary Final	Saturday, 11 September (7:10 pm)	Western Bulldogs	**6.9 (45)**	17.14 (116)	Lost by 71 points	Adelaide Oval (H)	26,400	

=== Ladder ===
Pos	Team	Pld	W	L	D	PF	PA	PP	Pts	Qualification
1	Melbourne (P)	22	17	4	1	1888	1443	130.8	70	Finals series
**2**	Port Adelaide	**22**	**17**	**5**	**0**	**1884**	**1492**	**126.3**	68	Finals series
3	Geelong	22	16	6	0	1845	1456	126.7	64	Finals series
4	Brisbane Lions	22	15	7	0	2131	1599	133.3	60	Finals series
5	Western Bulldogs	22	15	7	0	1994	1501	132.8	60	Finals series
6	Sydney	22	15	7	0	1986	1656	119.9	60	Finals series
7	Greater Western Sydney	22	11	10	1	1768	1773	99.7	46	Finals series
8	Essendon	22	11	11	0	1953	1790	109.1	44	Finals series
9	West Coast	22	10	12	0	1752	1880	93.2	40	
10	St Kilda	22	10	12	0	1644	1796	91.5	40	
11	Fremantle	22	10	12	0	1578	1825	86.5	40	
12	Richmond	22	9	12	1	1743	1780	97.9	38	
13	Carlton	22	8	14	0	1746	1972	88.5	32	
14	Hawthorn	22	7	13	2	1629	1912	85.2	32	
15	Adelaide	22	7	15	0	1616	1971	82.0	28	
16	Gold Coast	22	7	15	0	1430	1863	76.8	28	
17	Collingwood	22	6	16	0	1557	1818	85.6	24	
18	North Melbourne	22	4	17	1	1458	2075	70.3	18	

Updated to match(es) played on 21 August 2021. Source: AFL
Rules for classification: 1) points; 2) percentage; 3) number of points for.
(P) Premiers

== SANFL season ==
=== Pre-season ===
**Date and time**	**Opponent**	**Scores** (Port Adelaide's scores indicated in **bold**)			**Venue**	**Ref.**
**Date and time**	**Opponent**	Home	Away	Result	**Venue**	**Ref.**
Saturday, 27 February (8:30 am)	Adelaide	**6.16 (52)**	9.12 (66)	Lost by 14 points	Alberton Oval (H)	
Thursday, 4 March (6:00 pm)	South Adelaide	**8.13 (61)**	7.7 (49)	Won by 12 points	Alberton Oval (H)	
Friday, 19 March (5:00 pm)	Sturt	**8.13 (61)**	14.18 (92)	Lost by 31 points	Alberton Oval (H)	
Friday, 26 March (5:00 pm)	Adelaide	**13.11 (89)**	11.8 (74)	Won by 15 points	Alberton Oval (H)	

=== Regular season ===
**Rd**	**Date and time**	**Opponent**	**Scores** (Port Adelaide's scores indicated in **bold**)			**Venue**	**Attendance**	**Ladder**	**Ref.**
**Rd**	**Date and time**	**Opponent**	Home	Away	Result	**Venue**	**Attendance**	**Ladder**	**Ref.**
1	Friday, 1 April (7:40 pm)	Norwood	14.13 (97)	**7.10 (52)**	Lost by 45 points	Coopers Stadium (A)	4,946	8th	
2	Saturday, 10 April (2:10 pm)	Central District	**8.16 (64)**	7.5 (47)	Won by 17 points	Alberton Oval (H)	1,568	6th	
3	Saturday, 17 April (2:10 pm)	South Adelaide	12.9 (81)	**10.12 (72)**	Lost by 9 points	Flinders University Stadium (A)	1,471	7th	
4	Saturday, 24 April (6:30 pm)	Glenelg	12.11 (83)	**10.13 (73)**	Lost by 10 points	ACH Group Stadium (A)	N/A	7th	
5	Sunday, 2 May (2:10 pm)	Woodville-West Torrens	**16.11 (107)**	7.5 (47)	Won by 60 points	Alberton Oval (H)	1,927	5th	
6	Saturday, 8 May (4:05 pm)	Adelaide	**13.9 (87)**	10.13 (73)	Won by 14 points	Adelaide Oval (H)	1,582	5th	
7	Saturday, 22 May (1:10 pm)	North Adelaide	**13.8 (86)**	11.12 (78)	Won by 8 points	Alberton Oval (H)	1,885	5th	
8	Saturday, 29 May (2:10 pm)	West Adelaide	**12.9 (81)**	8.4 (52)	Won by 29 points	Alberton Oval (H)	1,410	4th	
9	Bye							4th	
10	Saturday, 12 June (2:10 pm)	Woodville-West Torrens	17.7 (109)	**6.5 (41)**	Lost by 68 points	Maughan Thiem Kia Oval (A)	2,482	5th	
11	Sunday, 20 June (2:10 pm)	Sturt	**7.8 (50)**	14.7 (91)	Lost by 41 points	Alberton Oval (H)	2,180	5th	
12	Saturday, 26 June (1:25 pm)	North Adelaide	18.12 (120)	**6.8 (44)**	Lost by 76 points	Prospect Oval (A)	1,516	6th	
13	Saturday, 3 July (2:10 pm)	Central District	6.12 (48)	**9.3 (57)**	Won by 9 points	X Convenience Oval (A)	1,687	6th	
14	Saturday, 10 July (2:35 pm))	Norwood	**9.6 (60)**	14.12 (96)	Lost by 36 points	Alberton Oval (H)	2,096	6th	
15	Sunday, 18 July (1:10 pm)	West Adelaide	11.5 (71)	**13.6 (84)**	Won by 13 points	Hisense Stadium (A)	1,346	6th	
16	Saturday, 7 August (3:30 pm)	Adelaide	13.4 (82)	**10.9 (69)**	Lost by 13 points	Adelaide Oval (A)	N/A	7th	
17	Saturday, 14 August (2:30 pm)	Sturt	14.12 (96)	**10.12 (72)**	Lost by 24 points	Peter Motley Oval (A)	2,151	7th	
18	Saturday, 21 August (2:05 pm)	South Adelaide	**15.7 (97)**	13.6 (84)	Won by 13 points	Alberton Oval (H)	N/A	7th	
19	Saturday, 4 September (2:10 pm)	Glenelg	**11.8 (74)**	5.8 (38)	Won by 36 points	Alberton Oval (H)	2,370	7th	

=== Ladder ===
Pos	Team	Pld	W	L	D	PF	PA	PP	Pts	Qualification
1	Glenelg	18	17	1	0	1607	1189	57.47	34	Finals series
2	Woodville-West Torrens (P)	18	13	5	0	1568	1056	59.76	26	Finals series
3	Norwood	18	11	7	0	1188	1101	51.90	22	Finals series
4	North Adelaide	18	10	8	0	1543	1209	56.07	20	Finals series
5	South Adelaide	18	10	8	0	1359	1283	51.44	20	Finals series
6	Sturt	18	9	9	0	1231	1095	52.92	18	
**7**	Port Adelaide	**18**	**9**	**9**	**0**	**1270**	**1393**	**47.69**	18	
8	Adelaide	18	5	13	0	1204	1679	41.76	10	
9	Central District	18	4	14	0	1070	1496	41.70	8	
10	West Adelaide	18	2	16	0	1001	1540	39.39	4	

Source: sanfl.com.au
Rules for classification: 1) points; 2) percentage; 3) number of points for.
(P) Premiers

== Awards ==
=== Power (AFL) ===
- John Cahill Medal – Ollie Wines
- Runner Up – Travis Boak
- Bruce Weber Medal – Aliir Aliir
- Fos Williams Medal – Travis Boak
- Gavin Wanganeen Award – Mitch Georgiades
- Coaches’ Award – Karl Amon
- John McCarthy Award – Travis Boak

=== Magpies (SANFL) ===
- A.R. McLean Medal – Sam Hayes
- A.R McLean Medal Runner-Up – Joel Garner
- Anthony Williams Memorial Trophy – Campbell Wildman
- Leading goalkicker – Dylan Williams (31 goals)
- Bob Clayton Award – Bob O’Malley
