= 2023 Port Adelaide Football Club season =

Port Adelaide Football Club
2023 season
- President: David Koch
- Coach: Ken Hinkley (AFL); Lauren Arnell (AFLW); Tyson Goldsack (SANFL)
- Captains: Tom Jonas (AFL); Erin Phillips (AFLW); Cameron Sutcliffe (SANFL)
- Home ground: Adelaide Oval (AFL); Alberton Oval (AFLW); Alberton Oval (SANFL)
- Regular season: 3rd (AFL); 15th (AFLW); 5th (SANFL)
- Finals series: Semi Final (AFL); DNQ (AFLW); Elimination Final (SANFL)

The 2023 Port Adelaide Football Club season was the club's 27th season in the Australian Football League (AFL) and the 153rd year since its inception in 1870. The club also fielded its reserves men's team in the South Australian National Football League (SANFL) and its women's team in the AFL Women's (AFLW).

== Squads ==
=== AFL ===
2023 Port Adelaide Football Club AFL squad
Senior list		Rookie list	Coaching staff
1 Tom Jonas (c); 2 Sam Powell-Pepper; 3 Ryan Burton; 4 Todd Marshall; 5 Dan Houston; 6 Kane Farrell; 7 Xavier Duursma; 8 Josh Sinn; 9 Zak Butters; 10 Travis Boak; 11 Jeremy Finlayson; 12 Trent McKenzie; 13 Orazio Fantasia; 14 Miles Bergman; 15 Junior Rioli; 16 Ollie Wines (vc); 17 Tom Clurey; 18 Jason Horne-Francis; 19 Mitch Georgiades	20 Connor Rozee; 21 Aliir Aliir; 22 Charlie Dixon; 25 Sam Hayes; 26 Riley Bonner; 28 Willem Drew; 29 Scott Lycett; 30 Ollie Lord; 31 Francis Evans; 32 Thomas Scully; 33 Darcy Byrne-Jones; 34 Lachie Jones; 36 Jase Burgoyne; 37 Tom McCallum; 38 Dante Visentini; 39 Hugh Jackson; 40 Kyle Marshall; 44 Jackson Mead	23 Dylan Williams; 24 Jake Pasini; 27 Brynn Teakle; 41 Jed McEntee; 43 Trent Dumont; 45 Nathan Barkla (B)	Head coach: Ken Hinkley; Assistant coaches: Nathan Bassett (forwards); Josh Carr (midfield); Chad Cornes (defence); Matthew Lobbe (rucks); Tyson Goldsack (SANFL coach); Luke Kelly (midfield development); Hamish Hartlett (defence development); Legend: (c) Captain(s); (vc) Vice-captain(s); (B) Category B rookie; italics - Inactive player list; Long-term injury; (ret.) Retired; Updated: 1 March 2026; Source(s):

=== SANFL ===
2023 Port Adelaide Football Club SANFL squad
SANFL list (Note: Port Adelaide AFL-listed players (not selected to play AFL) are allowed to play for the SANFL squad.)		Coaching Staff
Cameron Sutcliffe; Dylan Aldridge; Preston Cockatoo-Collins; Oliver Cheesman; Miller Carter; Hugh Ferrari; Will Ferrari; Jed Hagan; Brayden Kirk; Jackson Lee; Charlie McArthur	Nick Moore; Ethan Miller; Will Ferrari; Brodie Motlop; Ethan Moore; Murphy Short; Cody Szust; Aidan Turner; Jake Weidemann; Campbell Wildman; Anthony Wilson	Head coach: Tyson Goldsack; Legend: (c) Captain(s); (vc) Vice-captain(s); Updated: 30 March 2023; Source(s):

=== AFLW ===
2023 Port Adelaide Football Club AFLW squad
Senior list		Coaching staff
1 Erin Phillips (c); 2 Ebony O'Dea; 3 Ange Foley (vc); 4 Jade Halfpenny; 5 Abbey Dowrick; 6 Jacqui Yorston (i); 7 Yasmin Duursma; 8 Ashleigh Saint; 9 Maria Moloney; 10 Indy Tahau; 11 Jade de Melo; 12 Hannah Ewings; 13 Jasmin Stewart; 14 Justine Mules; 15 Julia Teakle; 16 Maggie MacLachlan; 17 Ella Boag	18 Olivia Levicki; 19 Alex Ballard; 20 Sachi Syme; 21 Amelie Borg; 23 Lily Johnson; 24 Hannah Dunn; 25 Janelle Cuthbertson; 26 Madeline Keryk; 27 Gemma Houghton; 28 Cheyenne Hammond; 29 Matilda Scholz; 30 Laquoiya Cockatoo-Motlap; 31 Litonya Cockatoo-Motlap; 32 Jasmine Simmons; 43 Georgie Jaques; 44 Katelyn Pope	Head coach: Lauren Arnell; Assistant coaches: Daniel Caire (assistant coach); Sam Virgo (assistant coach); Cam Sutcliffe (assistant coach); Dave Reynolds (development coach); Braedon Talbot (development coach); Legend: (c) Captain(s); (vc) Vice-captain(s); (i) Inactive player; Updated: 1 March 2026; Source(s):

== AFL season ==
=== Pre-season ===
**Date and time**	**Opponent**	**Scores** (Port Adelaide's scores indicated in **bold**)			**Venue**	**Ref.**
**Date and time**	**Opponent**	Home	Away	Result	**Venue**	**Ref.**
Saturday, 25 February (2:00 pm)	West Coast	13.6 (84)	**11.10 (76)**	Lost by 8 points	Mineral Resources Park	
Thursday, 2 March (4:10 pm)	Fremantle	13.14 (92)	**8.13 (61)**	Lost by 31 points	Fremantle Oval	

=== Regular season ===
**Rd**	**Date and time**	**Opponent**	**Scores** (Port Adelaide's scores indicated in **bold**)			**Venue**	**Attendance**	**Ladder**	**Ref.**
**Rd**	**Date and time**	**Opponent**	Home	Away	Result	**Venue**	**Attendance**	**Ladder**	**Ref.**
1	Saturday, 18 March (4:05 pm)	Brisbane Lions	**18.18 (126)**	11.6 (72)	Won by 54 points	Adelaide Oval (H)	34,255	4th	
2	Saturday, 25 March (1:45 pm)	Collingwood	21.9 (135)	**9.10 (64)**	Lost by 71 points	Melbourne Cricket Ground (A)	60,744	11th	
3	Saturday, 1 April (7:00 pm)	Adelaide	**13.8 (86)**	18.9 (117)	Lost by 31 points	Adelaide Oval (H)	48,962	13th	
4	Saturday, 8 April (7:30 pm)	Sydney	9.10 (64)	**9.12 (66)**	Won by 2 points	Sydney Cricket Ground (A)	31,686	10th	
5	Saturday, 15 April (7:20 pm)	Western Bulldogs	**10.10 (70)**	8.8 (56)	Won by 14 points	Adelaide Oval (H)	45,115	9th	
6	Saturday, 22 April (1:15 pm)	West Coast	**16.13 (109)**	10.9 (69)	Won by 40 points	Adelaide Oval (H)	31,638	7th	
7	Friday, 28 April (7:50 pm)	St Kilda	11.10 (76)	**12.11 (83)**	Won by 7 points	Marvel Stadium (A)	25,845	6th	
8	Sunday, 7 May (12:40 pm)	Essendon	**12.20 (92)**	13.9 (87)	Won by 5 points	Adelaide Oval (H)	36,247	5th	
9	Saturday, 13 May (2:10 pm)	North Melbourne	10.5 (65)	**20.15 (135)**	Won by 70 points	Blundstone Arena (A)	6,310	4th	
10	Friday, 19 May (7:20 pm)	Melbourne	**11.14 (80)**	11.10 (76)	Won by 4 points	Adelaide Oval (H)	37,565	3rd	
11	Sunday, 28 May (1:10 pm)	Richmond	9.13 (67)	**10.17 (77)**	Won by 10 points	Melbourne Cricket Ground (A)	30,357	2nd	
12	Saturday, 3 June (1:15 pm)	Hawthorn	**23.13 (151)**	14.12 (96)	Won by 55 points	Adelaide Oval (H)	34,234	2nd	
13	Friday, 9 June (7:50 pm)	Western Bulldogs	13.7 (85)	**16.11 (107)**	Won by 22 points	Marvel Stadium (A)	23,110	2nd	
14	Thursday, 15 June (7:10 pm)	Geelong	**16.14 (110)**	11.6 (72)	Won by 38 points	Adelaide Oval (H)	36,316	1st	
15	Bye							2nd	
16	Saturday, 1 July (7:25 pm)	Essendon	10.14 (74)	**11.12 (78)**	Won by 4 points	Melbourne Cricket Ground (A)	38,957	2nd	
17	Saturday, 8 July (7:10 pm)	Gold Coast	**16.10 (106)**	11.7 (73)	Won by 33 points	Adelaide Oval (H)	31,053	2nd	
18	Saturday, 15 July (4:35 pm)	Carlton	18.14 (122)	**10.12 (72)**	Lost by 50 points	Marvel Stadium (A)	34,306	2nd	
19	Saturday, 22 July (7:10 pm)	Collingwood	**12.11 (83)**	13.7 (85)	Lost by 2 points	Adelaide Oval (H)	47,965	2nd	
20	Saturday, 29 July (7:10 pm)	Adelaide	16.16 (112)	**9.11 (65)**	Lost by 47 points	Adelaide Oval (A)	50,023	2nd	
21	Saturday, 5 August (7:25 pm)	Geelong	14.13 (97)	**12.13 (85)**	Lost by 12 points	GMHBA Stadium (A)	21,279	4th	
22	Sunday, 13 August (4:10 pm)	Greater Western Sydney	**21.10 (136)**	13.7 (85)	Won by 51 points	Adelaide Oval (H)	32,597	3rd	
23	Sunday, 20 August (2:40 pm)	Fremantle	8.10 (58)	**11.8 (74)**	Won by 16 points	Optus Stadium (A)	38,360	3rd	
24	Sunday, 27 August (12:00 pm)	Richmond	**13.16 (94)**	8.15 (63)	Won by 31 points	Adelaide Oval (H)	39,860	3rd	

=== Finals series ===
**Round**	**Date and time**	**Opponent**	**Scores** (Port Adelaide's scores indicated in **bold**)			**Venue**	**Attendance**	**Ref.**
**Round**	**Date and time**	**Opponent**	Home	Away	Result	**Venue**	**Attendance**	**Ref.**
Second Qualifying Final	Saturday, 9 September (7:25 pm)	Brisbane Lions	19.9 (123)	**11.9 (75)**	Lost by 48 points	Gabba (A)	36,020	
Second Semi Final	Saturday, 16 September (7:10 pm)	Greater Western Sydney	**9.16 (70)**	13.15 (93)	Lost by 23 points	Adelaide Oval (H)	45,520	
Port Adelaide was eliminated from the 2023 AFL finals series

=== Ladder ===
Pos	Team	Pld	W	L	D	PF	PA	PP	Pts	Qualification
1	Collingwood (P)	23	18	5	0	2142	1687	127.0	72	Finals series
2	Brisbane Lions	23	17	6	0	2180	1771	123.1	68	Finals series
**3**	Port Adelaide	**23**	**17**	**6**	**0**	**2149**	**1906**	**112.7**	68	Finals series
4	Melbourne	23	16	7	0	2079	1660	125.2	64	Finals series
5	Carlton	23	13	9	1	1922	1697	113.3	54	Finals series
6	St Kilda	23	13	10	0	1775	1647	107.8	52	Finals series
7	Greater Western Sydney	23	13	10	0	2018	1885	107.1	52	Finals series
8	Sydney	23	12	10	1	2050	1863	110.0	50	Finals series
9	Western Bulldogs	23	12	11	0	1919	1766	108.7	48	
10	Adelaide	23	11	12	0	2193	1877	116.8	44	
11	Essendon	23	11	12	0	1838	2050	89.7	44	
12	Geelong	23	10	12	1	2088	1855	112.6	42	
13	Richmond	23	10	12	1	1856	1983	93.6	42	
14	Fremantle	23	10	13	0	1835	1898	96.7	40	
15	Gold Coast	23	9	14	0	1839	2006	91.7	36	
16	Hawthorn	23	7	16	0	1686	2101	80.2	28	
17	North Melbourne	23	3	20	0	1657	2318	71.5	12	
18	West Coast	23	3	20	0	1418	2674	53.0	12	

Source: afl.com.au
Rules for classification: 1) points; 2) percentage; 3) number of points for
(P) Premiers

== SANFL season ==
=== Pre-season ===
**Date and time**	**Opponent**	**Scores** (Port Adelaide's scores indicated in **bold**)			**Venue**	**Ref.**
**Date and time**	**Opponent**	Home	Away	Result	**Venue**	**Ref.**
Saturday, 18 March (11:00 am)	North Adelaide	17.10 (112)	**8.11 (59)**	Lost by 53 points	Thebarton Oval (A)	
Sunday, 26 March (10:00 am)	Adelaide	**6.11 (47)**	16.11 (107)	Lost by 60 points	Alberton Oval (H)	

=== Regular season ===
**Rd**	**Date and time**	**Opponent**	**Scores** (Port Adelaide's scores indicated in **bold**)			**Venue**	**Attendance**	**Ladder**	**Ref.**
**Rd**	**Date and time**	**Opponent**	Home	Away	Result	**Venue**	**Attendance**	**Ladder**	**Ref.**
1	Saturday, 1 April (3:00 pm)	Adelaide	**6.10 (46)**	19.10 (124)	Lost by 78 points	Adelaide Oval (H)	N/A (Note: No attendance recorded as the match was a curtain raiser to the AFL game played afterwards.)	10th	
2	Friday, 7 April (4:40 pm)	Glenelg	10.10 (70)	**7.11 (53)**	Lost by 17 points	Glenelg Oval (A)	3,766	9th	
(Note: Trial match played during a bye week for the SANFL.)	Saturday, 15 April (4:00 pm)	AFL National Academy	8.9 (57)	**10.10 (70)**	Won by 13 points	Summit Sports Park (A)	N/A	N/A	
3	Sunday, 23 April (2:10 pm)	Sturt	16.12 (108)	**10.10 (70)**	Lost by 38 points	Unley Oval (A)	3,212	9th	
4	Sunday, 30 April (2:10 pm)	West Adelaide	10.8 (68)	**12.13 (85)**	Won by 17 points	Loxton Oval (A)	1,387	9th	
5	Saturday, 6 May (2:30 pm)	Norwood	**8.10 (58)**	7.9 (51)	Won by 7 points	Alberton Oval (H)	1,544	6th	
6	Sunday, 14 May (2:10 pm)	South Adelaide	**15.12 (102)**	11.8 (74)	Won by 28 points	Alberton Oval (H)	1,194	6th	
7	Saturday, 27 May (2:10 pm)	North Adelaide	15.10 (100)	**14.8 (92)**	Lost by 8 points	Prospect Oval (A)	1,639	7th	
8	Sunday, 4 June (2:10 pm)	Woodville-West Torrens	**8.11 (59)**	9.8 (62)	Lost by 3 points	Alberton Oval (H)	1,690	7th	
9	Saturday, 10 June (2:10 pm)	Central District	**13.14 (92)**	10.9 (69)	Won by 23 points	Alberton Oval (H)	1,738	6th	
10	Sunday, 18 June (2:10 pm)	Norwood	8.12 (60)	**8.5 (53)**	Lost by 7 points	Norwood Oval (A)	2,382	6th	
11	Saturday, 1 July (2:10 pm)	West Adelaide	**13.14 (92)**	12.10 (82)	Won by 10 points	Alberton Oval (H)	1,314	4th	
12	Saturday, 8 July (12:40 pm)	Woodville-West Torrens	8.4 (52)	**13.10 (88)**	Won by 36 points	Woodville Oval (A)	1,411	4th	
13	Saturday, 15 July (2:10 pm)	North Adelaide	**14.7 (91)**	6.17 (53)	Won by 38 points	Alberton Oval (H)	1,195	4th	
14	Sunday, 23 July (1:10 pm)	Sturt	**10.13 (73)**	7.12 (54)	Won by 19 points	Alberton Oval (H)	1,717	4th	
15	Saturday, 29 July (3:30 pm)	Adelaide	14.8 (92)	**2.15 (27)**	Lost by 65 points	Adelaide Oval (A)	N/A	4th	
16	Saturday, 12 August (4:40 pm)	Glenelg	**8.9 (57)**	9.12 (66)	Lost by 9 points	Alberton Oval (H)	1,290	4th	
17	Saturday, 19 August (2:10 pm)	South Adelaide	15.7 (97)	**14.13 (97)**	Draw	Noarlunga Oval (A)	1,380	4th	
18	Saturday, 26 August (2:10 pm)	Central District	14.7 (91)	**11.10 (76)**	Lost by 15 points	Elizabeth Oval (A)	2,253	5th	

=== Finals series ===
**Round**	**Date and time**	**Opponent**	**Scores** (Port Adelaide's scores indicated in **bold**)			**Venue**	**Attendance**	**Ref.**
**Round**	**Date and time**	**Opponent**	Home	Away	Result	**Venue**	**Attendance**	**Ref.**
Elimination Final	Sunday, 3 September (12:15 pm)	Central District	12.10 (82)	**11.9 (75)**	Lost by 7 points	Adelaide Oval (A)	8,021 (Note: Total attendance for a double-header which featured another matched played after this one.)	
Port Adelaide was eliminated from the 2023 SANFL finals series

=== Ladder ===
Pos	Team	Pld	W	L	D	PF	PA	PP	Pts	Qualification
1	Glenelg (P)	18	15	3	0	1523	1048	59.24	30	**Finals series**
2	Sturt	18	14	4	0	1289	1193	51.93	28	**Finals series**
3	Adelaide	18	13	5	0	1627	1069	60.35	26	**Finals series**
4	Central District	18	9	9	0	1084	1192	47.63	18	**Finals series**
**5**	Port Adelaide	**18**	**8**	**9**	**1**	**1311**	**1373**	**48.85**	17	**Finals series**
6	North Adelaide	18	8	10	0	1086	1245	46.59	16	
7	Norwood	18	6	11	1	1053	1248	45.76	13	
8	Woodville-West Torrens	18	6	12	0	1152	1286	47.25	12	
9	South Adelaide	18	5	12	1	1084	1353	44.48	11	
10	West Adelaide	18	4	13	1	1110	1312	45.83	9	

Source: SANFL
Rules for classification: 1) points; 2) percentage; 3) number of points for.
(P) Premiers

== AFLW season ==
=== Pre-season ===
**Date and time**	**Opponent**	**Scores** (Port Adelaide's scores indicated in **bold**)			**Venue**	**Ref.**
**Date and time**	**Opponent**	Home	Away	Result	**Venue**	**Ref.**
Saturday, 12 August (11:00 am)	Greater Western Sydney	**8.5 (53)**	3.4 (22)	Won by 21 points	Alberton Oval (H)	
Friday, 18 August (7:10 pm)	St Kilda	**9.4 (58)**	2.10 (22)	Won by 36 points	Alberton Oval (H)	

=== Regular season ===
**Rd**	**Date and time**	**Opponent**	**Scores** (Port Adelaide's scores indicated in **bold**)			**Venue**	**Attendance**	**Ladder**	**Ref.**
**Rd**	**Date and time**	**Opponent**	Home	Away	Result	**Venue**	**Attendance**	**Ladder**	**Ref.**
1	Saturday, 2 September (2:35 pm)	Adelaide	8.10 (58)	**4.4 (28)**	Lost by 30 points	Norwood Oval (A)	8,772	15th	
2	Saturday, 9 September (12:35 pm)	Brisbane	**4.2 (26)**	11.10 (76)	Lost by 50 points	Alberton Oval (H)	1,928	17th	
3	Sunday, 17 September (1:05 pm)	St Kilda	7.6 (48)	**8.8 (56)**	Won by 8 points	RSEA Park (A)	2,016	14th	
4	Saturday, 23 September (12:35 pm)	Geelong	**5.12 (42)**	11.4 (70)	Lost by 28 points	Alberton Oval (H)	2,132	14th	
5	Friday, 29 September (7:15 pm)	West Coast	6.3 (39)	**4.9 (33)**	Lost by 6 points	Mineral Resources Park (A)	1,134	14th	
6	Saturday, 7 October (4:35 pm)	Sydney	**3.12 (30)**	6.9 (45)	Lost by 15 points	Alberton Oval (H)	2,597	14th	
7	Sunday, 15 October (1:05 pm)	North Melbourne	13.9 (87)	**2.6 (18)**	Lost by 69 points	Arden Street Oval (A)	1,912	15th	
8	Saturday, 21 October (4:35 pm)	Gold Coast	**7.3 (45)**	7.3 (45)	Draw	Alberton Oval (H)	1,853	17th	
9	Sunday, 29 October (5:05 pm)	Hawthorn	6.4 (40)	**5.2 (32)**	Lost by 8 points	Kinetic Stadium (A)	1,771	17th	
10	Saturday, 4 November (2:35 pm)	Greater Western Sydney	**13.10 (88)**	4.6 (30)	Won by 58 points	Alberton Oval (H)	3,353	15th	

=== Ladder ===
Pos	Team	Pld	W	L	D	PF	PA	PP	Pts	Qualification
1	Adelaide	10	9	1	0	599	314	190.8	36	Finals series
2	Melbourne	10	8	2	0	653	293	222.9	32	Finals series
3	North Melbourne	10	7	3	0	478	213	224.4	28	Finals series
4	Brisbane (P)	10	7	3	0	505	339	149.0	28	Finals series
5	Gold Coast	10	6	3	1	416	351	118.5	26	Finals series
6	Geelong	10	6	4	0	449	318	141.2	24	Finals series
7	Essendon	10	6	4	0	379	354	107.1	24	Finals series
8	Sydney	10	6	4	0	462	432	106.9	24	Finals series
9	St Kilda	10	6	4	0	408	399	102.3	24	
10	Richmond	10	5	5	0	382	379	100.8	20	
11	Collingwood	10	5	5	0	331	399	83.0	20	
12	Carlton	10	4	6	0	361	420	86.0	16	
13	Fremantle	10	4	6	0	289	402	71.9	16	
14	Hawthorn	10	3	7	0	307	456	67.3	12	
**15**	Port Adelaide	**10**	**2**	**7**	**1**	**404**	**538**	**75.1**	10	
16	Greater Western Sydney	10	2	8	0	316	596	53.0	8	
17	West Coast	10	2	8	0	269	530	50.8	8	
18	Western Bulldogs	10	1	9	0	320	595	53.8	4	

Source: afl.com.au
Rules for classification: 1) points; 2) percentage; 3) number of points for
(P) Premiers

== Awards ==
=== Power (AFL) ===
- John Cahill Medal – Zak Butters
- Runner Up – Connor Rozee
- Bruce Weber Medal – Dan Houston
- Fos Williams Medal – Willem Drew
- Gavin Wanganeen Award – Jason Horne-Francis
- Coaches’ Award – Miles Bergman
- John McCarthy Award – Trent Dumont

=== Magpies (SANFL) ===
- A.R. McLean Medal – Nick Moore
- A.R McLean Medal Runner-Up – Trent Dumont
- A. Williams Memorial Trophy – Nick Moore
- Leading goalkicker – Cody Szust (22 goals)
- Bob Clayton Award – Paul Rizonico

=== Power (AFLW) ===
- Best and Fairest Medal – Abbey Dowrick
- Runner-Up Medal – Gemma Houghton
- Third Place Medal – Matilda Scholz
- Best First Year Player – Matilda Scholz
- Coaches Most Improved – Julia Teakle
- Players’ Player – Maria Moloney
