= Martin Gleeson (Australian footballer) =

Australian rules footballer

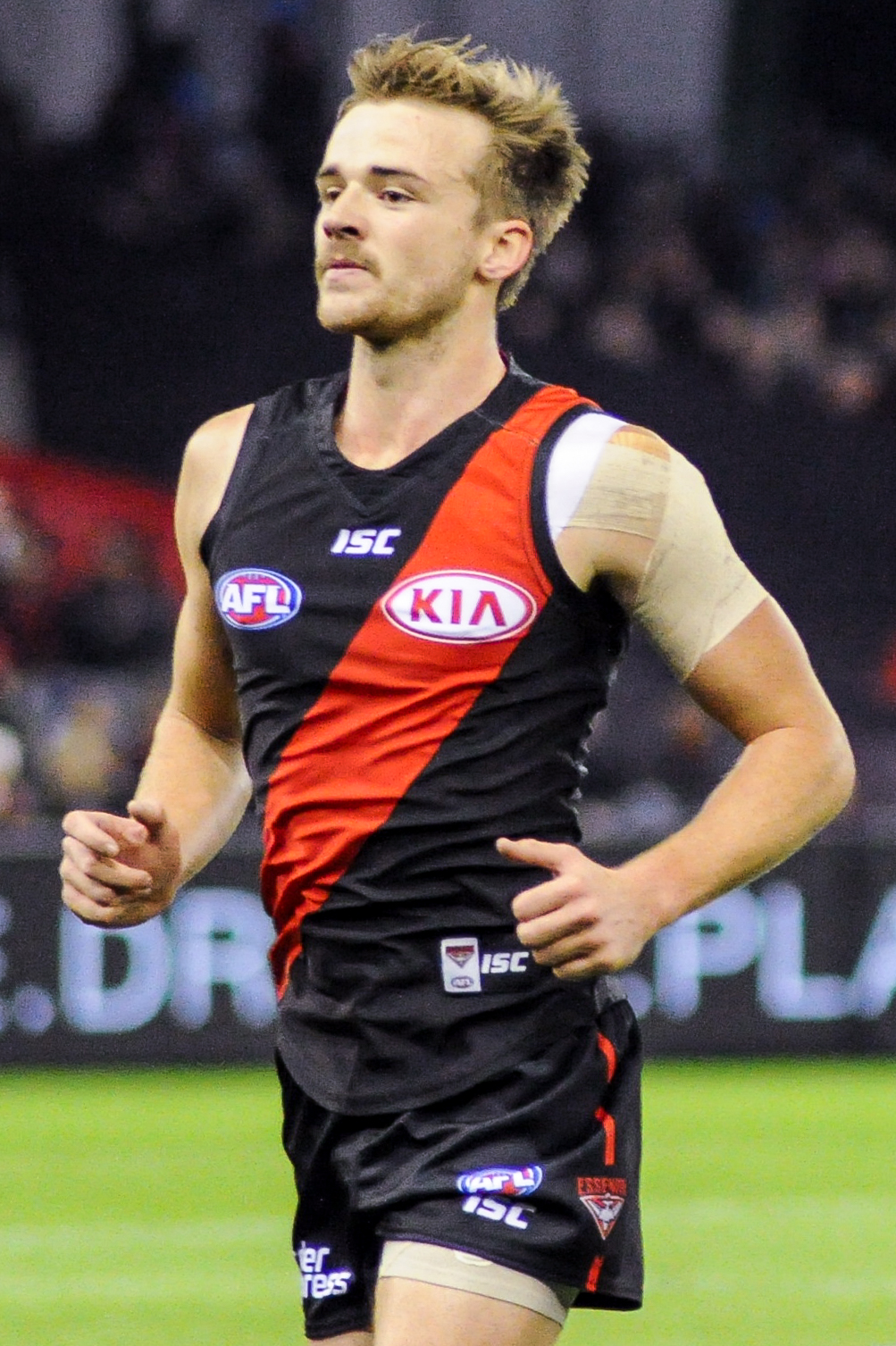
- Gleeson playing for Essendon in June 2017

Personal information
- Full name: Martin Gleeson
- Born: 25 August 1994 (age 32)
- Original team: North Ballarat Rebels (TAC Cup)/Koroit
- Draft: No. 53, 2012 national draft
- Height: 190 cm (6 ft 3 in)
- Weight: 85 kg (187 lb)
- Position: Medium Defender / Winger

Club information
- Current club: Essendon
- Number: 8

Playing career^{1}
Years	Club	Games (Goals)
2014–2021	Essendon	97 (5)
- ^{1} Playing statistics correct to the end of 2021.

Career highlights
- Essendon Trainers Award: 2020

Martin Gleeson (born 25 August 1994) is a former professional Australian rules footballer, who played for the Essendon Football Club in the Australian Football League (AFL). During his AFL career, he played primarily along the half-back flank. He is the nephew of former Carlton player Adrian Gleeson and the cousin of Port Adelaide player Willem Drew.

== Early career ==
Gleeson played for the North Ballarat Rebels in the TAC Cup. He was drafted by Essendon with pick 53 in the 2012 national draft and played 13 games in the VFL before injuring his shoulder. Like his uncle Adrian, he played for Koroit as a junior.

== AFL career ==
He made his AFL debut against North Melbourne in round 1 of the 2014 AFL season. He became a regular in the senior side until a serious ankle injury kept him out for the entire 2018 season. He returned to the seniors in 2019 but struggled to keep his spot. Known as a popular clubman he was delisted at the end of the 2021 season.

== Statistics ==
Statistics are correct to the end of 2021

Legend
G	Goals	K	Kicks	D	Disposals	T	Tackles
B	Behinds	H	Handballs	M	Marks

Season	Team	No.	Games	Totals							Averages (per game)						
Season	Team	No.	Games	G	B	K	H	D	M	T	G	B	K	H	D	M	T
2014	Essendon	35	9	2	4	71	42	113	37	15	0.2	0.4	7.9	4.7	12.6	4.1	1.7
2015	Essendon	35	22	2	3	152	154	306	84	45	0.1	0.1	6.9	7.0	13.9	3.8	2.1
2016	Essendon	8	20	0	1	181	172	353	106	35	0.0	0.1	9.1	8.6	17.7	5.3	1.8
2017	Essendon	8	18	1	0	196	100	296	106	32	0.1	0.0	10.9	5.6	16.4	5.9	1.8
2018	Essendon	8	-	-	-	-	-	-	-	-	-	-	-	-	-	-	-
2019	Essendon	8	9	0	1	92	57	149	40	10	0.0	0.1	10.2	6.3	16.6	4.4	1.1
2020	Essendon	8	13	0	0	75	65	140	40	17	0.0	0.0	5.8	5.0	10.8	3.1	1.3
2021	Essendon	8	6	0	0	33	27	60	21	11	0.0	0.0	5.5	4.5	10.0	3.5	1.8
Career			97	5	9	800	527	1327	434	165	0.1	0.1	8.4	6.5	14.9	4.5	1.7
