= Koroit Football Club =

Koroit

Names
- Full name: Koroit Football Netball Club
- Nickname: Saints

Club details
- Founded: 1886; 140 years ago
- Colours
- Competition: Hampden FNL
- Premierships: 12 (1971, 1973, 2003, 2007, 2009, 2014, 2015, 2016, 2017, 2018, 2019, 2022)
- Ground: Victoria Park

Uniforms
Home

Other information
- Official website: kfnc.com.au kit_alt1 =

The Koroit Football Netball Club, nicknamed the Saints, is an Australian rules football and netball club based in the small rural town of Koroit, Victoria. The club teams currently compete in the Hampden Football Netball League, with its football squad having played there since 1961.

== Premierships ==
- Western DFA
  - 1910
- Warrnambool DFA
  - 1919, 1923
- Warrnambool Football Association
  - 1943, 1944
- Port Fairy Football League
  - 1926, 1931, 1938, 1939, 1951, 1952, 1953
- Hampden Football Netball League
  - 1971, 1973, 2003, 2007, 2009, 2014, 2015, 2016, 2017, 2018, 2019, 2022

== Maskell Medallists ==
- Anthony Mahony 1996
- Jason Mifsud 1997
- Joe McLaren 2005
- Simon O'Keefe 2007 & 2011
- Ben Goodall 2013
- Isaac Templeton 2014 & 2015
- Brett Harrington 2018

== Notable players ==
VFL/AFL players recruited from Koroit include -

- Mark Dwyer (Fitzroy/St Kilda) 14 games
- Adrian Gleeson (Carlton) 176 games
- Chris Stacey (Fitzroy/Brisbane Bears) 4 games
- Joe McLaren (St. Kilda/North Melbourne) 69 games
- Gary Keane (Fitzroy) 55 games
- Martin Gleeson (Essendon) 97 games
- Roy Bence (South Melbourne/St Kilda) 159 games
- Willem Drew (Port Adelaide) 152 games as at 31/08/2026
- Ray Sault (Fitzroy) 41 games
- Finn O'Sullivan (North Melbourne) 41 games as at 31/08/2026
- Talor Byrne (Carlton) 18 games as at 31/08/2026
