= Mark Dwyer =

Australian rules footballer

Personal information
- Full name: Mark Dwyer
- Born: 5 August 1964 (age 62)
- Original team: Koroit
- Height: 175 cm (5 ft 9 in)
- Weight: 73 kg (161 lb)

Playing career^{1}
Years	Club	Games (Goals)
1986–1987	Fitzroy	13 (6)
1988	St Kilda	1 (0)
Total		14 (6)
- ^{1} Playing statistics correct to the end of 1988.

Mark Dwyer (born 5 August 1964) is a former Australian rules footballer who played with Fitzroy and St Kilda in the Victorian Football League (VFL) during the 1980s.

Dwyer was a wingman, best remembered for his strong debut season. He had started 1986 playing with Koroit but got a permit to join Fitzroy's reserves team during the season. In his second reserves outing he had 40 possessions and was promoted to the seniors by coach David Parkin. He made his VFL debut in round 15 and played every game for the rest of the year, including their thrilling finals wins over Essendon and Sydney as well as their preliminary final loss to Hawthorn.

He polled at least one vote in each of his first five games in the 1986 Brownlow Medal count and another three in his seventh. This gave him 10 votes and was enough to finish equal 11th, despite making just eight appearances. Everyone who had polled more votes had played 16 or more games. His success on the night likely cost teammate Paul Roos the medal, as the Fitzroy player fell one vote short.

In 1987, injury problems restricted him to just two VFL games and in the subsequent pre-season he tore his Achilles tendon during a practice match. As a result, he was traded to St Kilda midway through the year. A left footer, he played his only game for St Kilda in 1988 and spent the 1989 season in the VFA with Sandringham. He returned to Koroit in 1990 where he continued playing before moving to Warrnambool.
