= Molly Brooksby =

Australian rules footballer

Personal information
- Full name: Molly Brooksby
- Born: 18 July 2005 (age 21); Adelaide, South Australia
- Original team: Golden Grove (AdFL)/Norwood (SANFLW)
- Draft: 2024 Expansion under-18 talent pathway pre-signing
- Debut: 31 August 2024, Port Adelaide vs. Adelaide, at Alberton Oval
- Height: 172 cm (5 ft 8 in)

Club information
- Current club: Port Adelaide
- Number: 6

Playing career^{1}
Years	Club	Games (Goals)
2024–	Port Adelaide	35 (0)
- ^{1} Playing statistics correct to the end of Rd 9, 2026 season.

Career highlights
- Rising Star nomination: 2024

Molly Brooksby (born 18 July 2005) is a professional Australian rules footballer, playing for Port Adelaide in the AFL Women's (AFLW) competition.

Born in Adelaide, Brooksby initially played soccer before turning to Australian rules, playing junior football with Golden Grove Football Club in the Adelaide Footy League before moving to SANFL Women's League (SANFLW) club Norwood for the 2022 season.

Brooksby was named Norwood's best first-year player in 2022 and represented South Australia in the Under 18s National Championships, leading Port Adelaide to recruit Brooksby through the 2023 AFLW's Expansion Under 18s Talent Pathway.

Brooksby made her AFLW debut in the opening round of the 2024 AFL Women's season, against Adelaide at Alberton Oval. She was named the week 5 nominee for the 2024 AFL Women's Rising Star award.

== Personal life ==
At the age of 15, Brooksby was diagnosed with type 1 diabetes. She manages the condition with the use of an implanted continuous glucose monitor and regular blood sugar checks during matches and training.
