= Gary Keane =

Australian rules footballer

Personal information
- Full name: Gary Keane
- Born: 4 January 1964 (age 62)
- Original team: Koroit
- Height: 193 cm (6 ft 4 in)
- Weight: 92 kg (203 lb)

Playing career^{1}
Years	Club	Games (Goals)
1985–1989	Fitzroy	55 (55)
1990	Geelong	0 (0)
- ^{1} Playing statistics correct to the end of 1990.

Gary Keane (born 4 January 1964) is a former Australian rules footballer who played with Fitzroy in the Victorian Football League (VFL).

Keane, a forward, was recruited to Fitzroy from Koroit. He had his best season in 1987, when he kicked 23 goals, took 105 marks and earned 10 Brownlow Medal votes (equal most by a Fitzroy player).

At the end of the 1989 season, in which Keane didn't play a game, Fitzroy traded him to Geelong, in exchange for a second round selection in the 1989 VFL Draft. He was sacked by Geelong without playing a senior game. He later played for Frankston in the Victorian Football Association.
