= Golden Grove Football Club =

Golden Grove Kookaburras

Names
- Full name: Golden Grove Football Club
- Nickname: Kookaburras
- Club song: "We're The Mighty Kookaburras"

Club details
- Founded: 1995; 31 years ago
- Colours: Green, Gold, Blue
- Competition: Adelaide Footy League (Division M1, M1R, C1, C6, C7, W2, W2R)
- President: Kate Grandey
- Coach: Craig Smith
- Captain: Jake Pitman
- Premierships: 6 D2 (2023); D3 (2020, 2022); D4 (2014); D5 (2008); D6 (2003)
- Ground: Harper's Field, Golden Grove, South Australia (2005 - )
- Former ground: Greenwith Oval, Greenwith (1995–2004)

Uniforms
Home	Away	Alternate

Other information
- Official website: ggfc.com.au

The Golden Grove Football Club, more commonly known as the Kookaburras, is an Australian Rules Football Club based in the north-eastern suburbs of Adelaide that was formed in 1995. The club is based at Harper's Field, located on One Tree Hill Road in the northern suburbs of Adelaide. Golden Grove's five men's senior teams compete in the Adelaide Footy League Division 1, Division 1 Reserves, Division C1, C6 & C7 competitions. Its women's teams compete in the Adelaide Footy League Women's Division 2, & Division 2 Reserves competitions, whilst its junior teams compete in the SANFL Juniors competition.

== History ==
The football club lobbied for a long time to find a permanent home, with the club outgrowing its temporary home at the Greenwith Oval & Greenwith Community Centre within the first two years, after rapidly growing junior numbers. Despite this, the council, unfortunately, had nowhere else for the club to move to, and the club had to wait until 2001 before a decision to move from its temporary clubrooms could be made. Talks were held in the 2002 pre-season for the club to move its base to Golden Grove High School. However, negotiations with the school were stopped as neither party could agree on the building of a licensed clubhouse. Club officials were "disgraced" when offered a stop-gap solution by the council at the end of the 2002 season, offering to build new toilets and changerooms, but no clubrooms.

A breakthrough for a permanent home occurred in 2004 when the club was given the green light for a future permanent home at Harpers Field. However, there was still the major hurdle of funding for clubrooms. Originally approved for a $2.1m council grant to build clubrooms, this was later declined due to a change in federal government and the council not willing to pick up the extra 50% funding. A match in 2004 was one for the history books, when the Golden Grove A Grade defeated Greenacres by an enormous 297 points. This still remains the club's biggest win, highest score and the Adelaide Footy League's 27th highest ever score in a single match - 51.21 (327) d. 5.3 (33).

Late 2008 saw the final documents signed to secure a clubhouse and by the start of the 2010 season, the club was ready to operate from its new home. The club made agreements with Tea Tree Gully Council to assist with the development of the Harpers Field site and this led to the work starting on the second oval. The oval was finished and ready to use at the start of the 2013 season. This gave the club two ovals and marked the end of the use of Greenwith Oval. Since 2013, the club has developed the site to include goal netting, an electronic scoreboard, a canteen/kitchen extension and new lighting. The new floodlights were officially switched on at the trial game against Modbury on Saturday 21 March 2015. Early in 2015 the committee signed a ten-year lease of the Harpers Field site with Tea Tree Gully which gives the club primary use of all the facilities.

More recently the club was awarded a share of a national grant to upgrade women's change rooms at sporting venues around Australia. The upgraded changerooms were completed for the beginning of the 2017 season.

During the 2017 season, the 'Kookaburras' made their way through to the Division 3 Grand Final facing the Brighton Bombers who were competing in their first Adelaide Footy League season since moving from the Southern Football League, returning to the league they left 20 years ago. They were comfortably beaten by 49 points, however ensured their promotion into Division 2 for the 2018 season, being the highest division the club had ever competed in since its inception.

At an October 2019 Tea Tree Gully Council meeting, the Golden Grove Football Club had the motion passed for a feasibility study regarding expansion and a new clubhouse to be undertaken at Harpers Field. Following this feasibility study, a grant of $12 million was approved in April 2021 for a significant upgrade to the Harpers Field clubrooms and facilities. Early on-site works began in late 2022, with main building works commencing in February 2023. The project was completed and handed over in June 2024 and features four inclusive changerooms, bar, function area, grandstand with safe standing areas and viewing platform.

The 2023 season was the clubs most successful season on record, as the Kookaburras gained promotion into Division 1 for the first time in their 28-year history, with club record 95pt win over PHOS Camden in the 2023 Preliminary Final. They continued their success with their biggest Grand Final win in Golden Grove's short history two weeks later, a 56pt win over Payneham Norwood Union, the first time back-to-back A Grade premierships had been won (2022, 2023). Adding to the success, the season also featured the B Grade's continued dominance, winning their fourth premiership in a row (2020, 2021, 2022, 2023) with a record of 67–3 over the 4 years and the club's first ever Women's Premiership (Division 6).

== Senior Performance ==
		A Grade						B Grade	C Grade	D Grade	E Grade	Women	
Year	Div	Pos	Pld	W	L	D	Pts	B Grade	C Grade	D Grade	E Grade	A Grade	B Grade
1997	D7	2nd	18	13	4	0	28	D7R	-	-	-	-	-
1998	D6	6th	18	9	9	0	18	D6R	D10N	-	-	-	-
1999	D6	3rd	18	11	7	0	24	D6R	D10N	-	-	-	-
2000	D6	7th	18	7	10	0	14	D6R	D9N	-	-	-	-
2001	D6	4th	18	10	7	1	23	D6R	D10N	-	-	-	-
2002	D6	4th	18	11	7	0	24	D6R	D6R	D9N	-	-	-
2003	D6	1st	18	13	4	0	28	D6R	D9N	-	-	-	-
2004	D5	8th	18	6	11	0	12	D5R	D9N	-	-	-	-
2005	D5	6th	18	8	9	1	17	D5R	D9N	-	-	-	-
2006	D5	10th	18	4	14	0	8	D5R	D9N	-	-	-	-
2007	D6	1st	18	16	2	0	32	D5R	C5	-	-	-	-
2008	D5	1st	18	16	2	0	32	D5R	C5	-	-	-	-
2009	D4	6th	18	10	8	0	20	D4R	C4	C5	-	-	-
2010	D4	2nd	18	13	5	0	26	D4R	C4	C6	-	-	-
2011	D3	10th	18	2	15	1	5	D3R	C4	C6	-	-	-
2012	D4	4th	18	12	6	0	24	D4R	D8	D8R	-	-	-
2013	D4	2nd	18	14	4	0	28	D4R	D8	D8R	-	-	-
2014	D4	1st	18	17	1	0	34	D4R	D8	D8R	-	-	-
2015	D3	4th	16	9	7	0	18	D3R	D8	D8R	-	-	-
2016	D3	7th	18	7	11	0	14	D3R	C3	C5	-	-	-
2017	D3	3rd	18	13	5	0	26	D3R	C3	C5	-	D5	-
2018	D2	9th	18	3	15	0	6	D2R	D7	D7R	-	D4	D5
2019	D3	5th	18	11	6	1	23	D3R	C3	Club 18	C4	D3	D5
2020	D3	1st	8	7	1	0	14	D3R	C3	C7	C6	D1	D1R
2021	D3	2nd	18	15	3	0	30	D3R	C3	C8	C7	D3	D7
2022	D3	1st	18	18	0	0	36	D3R	C3	C7	C8	D3	D2R
2023	D2	1st	18	16	2	0	32	D2R	C2	C7	-	D2	D6
2024	D1	4th	18	10	8	0	20	D1R	C1	C5	C7	D1	D1R
2025	D1	2nd	18	14	4	0	28	D1R	C1	C6	C7	D1	D1R
2026	D1	3rd	18	13	5	0	26	D1R	C1	C7	C8	D2	D2R

*2020 Season was half the length, cut short due to COVID-19. The Adelaide Footy League informed all clubs that there would also be no promotion or relegation for the 2020 season.

Denotes Premiership
Denotes Promotion
Denotes Runner Up Grand Finalist
Denotes Relegation

== Club Honours ==
Total premierships: 45 (20 Senior / 25 Junior)

=== Men's Premierships ===
No.	Year	Grade	Opponent	Score	Venue
1	2002	B Grade (D6R)	North Pines	9.7 (61) def. 6.8 (44)	Hectorville Oval
2	2003	A Grade (D6)	Brahma Lodge	16.7 (103) def. 9.9 (63)	Blair Athol Reserve
3	2006	Under 17	Hectorville	15.8 (98) def. 12.8 (80)	Blair Athol Reserve
4	2007	B Grade (D5R)	Hope Valley	10.1 (61) def. 9.4 (58)	Salisbury Oval
5	2008	A Grade (D5)	Greenacres	10.10 (76) def. 10.12 (72)	Salisbury Oval
6	2008	C Grade (C5)	Modbury	9.7 (61) def. 8.6 (54)	Hope Valley Oval
7	2010	C Grade (C4)	Adelaide University	7.4 (46) def. 2.5 (17)	Thebarton Oval
8	2014	B Grade (D4R)*	Hope Valley	15.12 (102) def. 6.4 (40)	Adelaide Airport Stadium
9	2014	A Grade (D4)	Salisbury West	15.17 (107) def. 9.4 (58)	Adelaide Airport Stadium
10	2019	Under 18 (red)	Goodwood	6.7 (43) def. 3.5 (23)	Payneham Oval
11	2020	B Grade (D3R)	Flinders Park	9.11 (65) def. 9.9 (63)	Norwood Oval
12	2020	A Grade (D3)	Flinders Park	15.7 (97) def. 10.7 (67)	Norwood Oval
13	2021	C Grade (C3)	Flinders Park	10.9 (69) def. 4.6 (30)	Campbelltown Memorial Oval
14	2021	B Grade (D3R)*	Flinders Park	7.9 (51) def. 5.5 (35)	Campbelltown Memorial Oval
15	2022	B Grade (D3R)	Edwardstown	13.8 (86) def. 5.8 (38)	Elizabeth Oval
16	2022	A Grade (D3)*	Edwardstown	9.8 (62) def. 1.5 (11)	Elizabeth Oval
17	2023	B Grade (D2R)	Payneham NU	8.10 (58) def. 8.9 (57)	Hisense Stadium
18	2023	A Grade (D2)	Payneham NU	10.13 (73) def. 2.5 (17)	Hisense Stadium
19	2025	D Grade (C6)	Adelaide University	10.4 (64) def 6.12 (48)	Campbelltown Memorial Oval

=== Women's Premierships ===
No.	Year	Grade	Opponent	Score	Venue
1	2023	B Grade (D6W)	Athelstone	4.7 (31) def. 4.4 (28)	Blair Athol Oval

* Denotes undefeated premiership

- Senior
  - A Grade: 2003, 2008, 2014, 2020, 2022, 2023
  - B Grade: 2002, 2007, 2014, 2020, 2021, 2022, 2023
  - C Grade: 2008, 2010, 2021
  - D Grade: 2025
  - Under 18: 2019 (Div 1)
  - Under 17: 2006
  - Women B Grade: 2023
- Junior Boys
  - Under 16: 2005, 2006, 2007, 2024 (Div 1)
  - Under 15: 2009, 2021 (Div 4)
  - Under 14: 2017, 2023, 2025 (Div 5)
  - Under 13: 2005, 2018, 2019 (Div 1), 2019 (Div 3)
  - Under 12: 2015, 2017, 2022 (Div 1)
  - Under 11: 2009, 2011, 2016
- Junior Girls
  - Under 15: 2021
  - Under 14: 2026 (Div 2)
  - Under 13: 2010
  - Under 12: 2018, 2019, 2026 (Div 1)

== Golden Grove Juniors in the AFL ==
Year Drafted	Year Retired	Name	Club	Draft pick	Games Played
2006	2022	Shane Edwards	Richmond Tigers	26	303
2009	2019	Daniel Menzel	Geelong Cats (2010 - 2018) Sydney Swans (2018 - 2019)	17	80
2012	2017	Troy Menzel	Carlton Blues (2012 - 2015) Adelaide Crows (2015 - 2017)	11	44
2012	2016	Cameron Shenton	St. Kilda Saints	30 (rookie)	24
2012	2013	Justin Hoskin	Port Adelaide Power	20 (rookie)	0
2014	2022	Trent Dumont	North Melbourne Kangaroos (2014 - 2021) Port Adelaide Power (2022)	30	121
2020	-	Corey Durdin	Carlton Blues (2020 - 2025) Port Adelaide Power (2026 - )	37	64
2021	-	Harvey Harrison	Collingwood Magpies	52	16
2025	-	Indy Cotton	Adelaide Crows	Cat B	
2025	-	Matthew LeRay	Hawthorn Hawks	56	

== Golden Grove Juniors in the AFLW ==
Year Drafted	Year Retired	Name	Club	Draft pick	Games Played
2022	2024	Jade Halfpenny	Port Adelaide Power (2022 - 2024 )	*	8
2022	2024	Jade Halfpenny	Carlton Blues (2024) Joined as Inactive Replacement Signing	*	8
2022	-	Amelie Borg	Port Adelaide Power (2022 - )	61	45
2023	-	Molly Brooksby	Port Adelaide Power (2022 - )	*	26
2024	-	Georgia McKee	Adelaide Crows (2024 - )	44	0

* Denotes selected via the AFLW's Expansion Signing Period

== Guernseys ==
=== Senior home guernseys ===
- 1997–1999: green, gold and blue tri-panel (seniors only)
- 2000–2016: stylised gold kookaburra on a green/blue base, blue collar and cuffs, gold numbers
- 2017-current: green base, gold chevron with blue upper, blue cuffs and collar, gold numbers

=== Senior clash guernseys ===
- 2004–2020: stylised blue kookaburra on a gold base
- 2021-current: gold base, blue and green chevrons, blue cuffs and collar, blue numbers

=== Junior guernseys ===
- 1996–2000: bottle green base, yellow and blue 'V's, blue cuffs and collar, gold numbers (juniors only)
- 2000-current: stylised gold kookaburra on a green/blue base, blue collar and cuffs, gold numbers

=== One-off guernseys ===
- 2011: Breast Cancer Awareness Guernsey – pink base and pink numbers
- 2015: 20th Anniversary Guernsey – throwback guernsey based on 1996 junior guernsey
- 2016: ANZAC Day Guernsey – camouflage guernsey based on a modern take on the 1996 junior guernsey
- 2021: 1997 Inaugural Guernsey Replica - green, gold and blue tri panel (designed by Nick Gaudio)
- 2023: Indigenous Guernsey - green base, yellow and blue boomerangs (designed by Shane Edwards)
- 2024: ANZAC Day Guernsey - based on the current guernsey, featuring a smaller chevron with a silhouette of a lone soldier in front of a rising sun. The upper back of the guernsey features the names of both Harper brothers and their unit symbol - 52nd Battalion (designed by Nick Gaudio)
- 2025: 30th Anniversary Guernsey - 1:1 replica of the 1996 Junior guernsey, including stitched sponsors and collar

== Grounds ==
- 1996–2015: Greenwith Oval, The Golden Way, Greenwith (used as an overflow oval for junior games from 2005 to 2015)
- 2001–2003: Hargreaves Reserve (used as an overflow oval for junior games)
- 2005–current: Harpers Field, One Tree Hill Road, Golden Grove
