= Chris Stacey =

Australian rules footballer

Personal information
- Full name: Chris Stacey
- Born: 21 February 1966 (age 60)
- Original team: Koroit
- Height: 180 cm (5 ft 11 in)
- Weight: 76 kg (168 lb)

Playing career^{1}
Years	Club	Games (Goals)
1986	Fitzroy	1 (0)
1987	Brisbane Bears	3 (5)
Total		4 (5)
- ^{1} Playing statistics correct to the end of 1987.

Chris Stacey (born 21 February 1966) is a former Australian rules footballer who played with Fitzroy and the Brisbane Bears in the Victorian Football League (VFL).

Originally from Koroit, Stacey was called up only once by Fitzroy, for a game against the Sydney Swans at the SCG.

Stacey joined Brisbane for their maiden season in 1987 but had to wait until midway through the year to break into the seniors. When he eventually made his Bears debut, once more against the Swans, he starred with 16 disposals and four goals. He however played only two more games for Brisbane.

Back home in Victoria, Stacey played some good football with Dennington and was the leading goal-kicker in the Warrnambool District Football League for the 1996 and 1997 seasons.
