= 2024 AFL Women's Rising Star =

- Sponsored by: Telstra
- Date: 25 November 2024
- Venue: Crown Melbourne
- Hosted by: Brihony Dawson; Lauren Wood
- Winner: Matilda Scholz (Port Adelaide)

Television/radio coverage
- Network: Fox Footy

The 2024 AFL Women's Rising Star award was presented to the player adjudged the best young player during the 2024 AFL Women's season. Port Adelaide's Matilda Scholz won the award with 57 votes.

== Eligibility ==
To be eligible for nomination, players must be under 21 years of age on 31 December, have not previously been nominated for the award (unless they have played ten or fewer matches at the beginning of the season) and have not previously won the award.

== Nominations ==
Table of nominees
Week	Player	Club	Ref.
1	Shineah Goody	Port Adelaide	
2	Beth Schilling	West Coast	
3	Kaitlyn Srhoj	Greater Western Sydney	
4	Lucy Cronin	Collingwood	
5	Molly Brooksby	Port Adelaide	
6	Amy Gaylor	Essendon	
7	Matilda Scholz	Port Adelaide	
8	Elaine Grigg	Western Bulldogs	
9	Mikayla Williamson	Hawthorn	
10	J'Noemi Anderson	St Kilda	

Table of nominations by club
Number	Club	Player	Week
3	Port Adelaide	Shineah Goody	1
3	Port Adelaide	Molly Brooksby	5
3	Port Adelaide	Matilda Scholz	7
1	Collingwood	Lucy Cronin	4
1	Essendon	Amy Gaylor	6
1	Greater Western Sydney	Kaitlyn Srhoj	3
1	Hawthorn	Mikayla Williamson	9
1	St Kilda	J'Noemi Anderson	10
1	West Coast	Beth Schilling	2
1	Western Bulldogs	Elaine Grigg	8

== Final voting ==
Table of votes
Placing	Player	Club	Nom.	Votes
1	Matilda Scholz	Port Adelaide	7	57
2	Shineah Goody	Port Adelaide	1	48
3	Amy Gaylor	Essendon	6	26
4	Lucy Cronin	Collingwood	4	22
5	Beth Schilling	West Coast	2	12
6	Kaitlyn Srhoj	Greater Western Sydney	3	6
6	Elaine Grigg	Western Bulldogs	8	6
8	Molly Brooksby	Port Adelaide	5	1
8	Mikayla Williamson	Hawthorn	9	1
8	J’Noemi Anderson	St Kilda	10	1
