= Roy Bence =

Australian rules footballer, born 1900

Personal information
- Full name: Royal Robert Bence
- Born: 1 April 1900; Kirkstall, Victoria
- Died: 3 October 1979 (aged 79); Kew, Victoria
- Original team: Koroit
- Height: 163 cm (5 ft 4 in)
- Weight: 67 kg (148 lb)

Playing career^{1}
Years	Club	Games (Goals)
1922	South Melbourne	15 (6)
1925–1933	St Kilda	144 (83)
Total		159 (89)
- ^{1} Playing statistics correct to the end of 1933.

Roy "Tiger" Bence (1 April 1900 – 3 October 1979) was an Australian rules footballer who played with South Melbourne and St Kilda in the Victorian Football League (VFL).

Originally from Koroit, Bence was a rover and occasional forward pocket. He started his league career at South Melbourne but after only one season left for Brighton. His second attempt at establishing himself in the VFL was more successful. He played nine seasons for St Kilda, before retiring at the age of 33.
