= Matilda Scholz =

Australian rules footballer

- Scholz in 2026

Personal information
- Full name: Matilda Jane Scholz
- Born: 29 April 2005 (age 21); Adelaide, South Australia
- Original team: Glenelg (SANFLW)
- Draft: 2023 priority signing period
- Debut: Round 1, 2023, Port Adelaide vs. Adelaide, at Norwood Oval
- Height: 189 cm (6 ft 2 in)
- Position: Ruck

Club information
- Current club: Port Adelaide
- Number: 29

Playing career^{1}
Years	Club	Games (Goals)
2023–	Port Adelaide	35 (11)
- ^{1} Playing statistics correct to the end of 2025.

Career highlights
- 2× Port Adelaide Best & Fairest: 2024, 2025; Rising Star: 2024; Mark of the Year: 2024; All-Australian extended squad: 2024; 3× 22under22 team: 2023, 2024, 2025

Matilda Jane Scholz (born 29 April 2005) is a professional Australian rules footballer who plays for Port Adelaide Football Club in the AFL Women's (AFLW) competition.

== Early life ==
Born in Adelaide, South Australia to former Australian netball international Peta Scholz and David Scholz, Matilda was raised in Adelaide before temporarily moving with her family to Mt Maunganui, New Zealand in 2010 while her mother played for Waikato-Bay of Plenty Magic in the Trans-Tasman Netball League.

Playing her junior football with Adelaide Footy League club Mitcham, Scholz made her SANFL Women's League (SANFLW) senior debut for Glenelg Football Club in 2022, playing 11 games and finishing fifth in Glenelg's Best and Fairest.

== AFL Women's career ==
After being named in the under-18s All-Australian team in 2022, Scholz joined Port Adelaide as an underage signing in the 2023 AFLW season's priority signing period.

Making her AFLW debut in round 1, 2023, against Adelaide, Scholz played all 10 games of the AFLW home and away season, finishing third in Port Adelaide's best and fairest and awarded the club's best first year player award.

In 2024, Scholz played a key role in Port Adelaide's first AFLW final series, winning the club best and fairest as well as being included in the extended All-Australian squad. Scholz won the 2024 AFL Women's Rising Star award with 57 votes. She was also awarded with the 2024 Mark of the Year for her spectacular mark against Collingwood in week 7 of the season.

Scholz was the first women's footballer to win consecutive best-and-fairest awards for Port Adelaide, claiming the back-to-back honours in 2024 and 2025.

== Personal life ==
Scholz's sister Poppy was drafted by Carlton at the 2024 AFL Women's draft. Scholz's partner is teammate Abbey Dowrick. While she is dating a woman, Scholz doesn't identify with any particular label. Her pride in her sexuality is inspired by her mother, who entered a sapphic relationship following her divorce when Matilda was in her youth.

In March 2026, Scholz starred in the reality TV show Rivals: Sport vs. Sport representing "Team Aussie Rules".
