= Sam Hayes (footballer) =

Australian rules footballer (born 2001)

Personal information
- Born: 9 June 1999 (age 27)
- Original teams: Eastern Ranges (Talent League); Ferntree Gully (EFNL)
- Draft: No. 47, 2019 national draft
- Debut: Round 5, 2022, Port Adelaide vs. Carlton, at MCG
- Height: 203 cm (6 ft 8 in)
- Weight: 93 kg (205 lb)
- Position: Ruck

Playing career^{1}
Years	Club	Games (Goals)
2018–2023	Port Adelaide	11 (0)
- ^{1} Playing statistics correct to the end of 2023.

Sam Hayes (born 9 June 1999) is a former professional Australian rules footballer who played for the Port Adelaide Football Club in the Australian Football League (AFL).

== Early life and junior football ==
Drafted from the Eastern Ranges in the Talent League, Hayes played his junior football for Ferntree Gully in the Eastern Football Netball League (EFNL). He won the premiership in 2015 for Ferntree's under-17 side alongside teammate and future AFL Rising Star winner Jaidyn Stephenson. Hayes also kicked four goals in the under-16 Grand Final. His strong junior résumé led many to forecast that he would be taken in the top five of the 2017 national draft, but eventually slid to the third round when he was picked by the Power.

== AFL career ==
Hayes was selected by Port Adelaide with the 47th overall pick in the 2017 national draft. In 2021, Hayes was awarded with the A. R. McLean Medal as the best and fairest player for Port Adelaide's reserves team in the South Australia National Football League (SANFL) for the season. He was made to wait for more than four seasons to make his AFL debut, sitting behind ruckmen such as premiership player Scott Lycett, Paddy Ryder, and Peter Ladhams.

Following an injury to first-choice ruckman Lycett, Hayes made his AFL debut in round five of the 2022 season against Carlton at the MCG. He impressed in his first few senior appearances, challenging Lycett's position in the team once the ruck was healthy.

Following the 2023 AFL season, in which he made four appearances, Hayes was delisted by the Power. He went on to sign for the University Blues, who play in the VAFA back home in Melbourne, Victoria. He would later play for Strathmore in the Essendon District Football League.

== Statistics ==
Updated to the end of 2023.

Legend
G	Goals	K	Kicks	D	Disposals	T	Tackles
B	Behinds	H	Handballs	M	Marks	H/O	Hit-outs

Season	Team	No.	Games	Totals								Averages (per game)							
Season	Team	No.	Games	G	B	K	H	D	M	T	H/O	G	B	K	H	D	M	T	H/O
2018	Port Adelaide	25	0	–	–	–	–	–	–	–	–	–	–	–	–	–	–	–	–
2019	Port Adelaide	25	0	–	–	–	–	–	–	–	–	–	–	–	–	–	–	–	–
2020	Port Adelaide	25	0	–	–	–	–	–	–	–	–	–	–	–	–	–	–	–	–
2020	Port Adelaide	25	0	–	–	–	–	–	–	–	–	–	–	–	–	–	–	–	–
2022	Port Adelaide	25	7	0	0	25	29	54	11	9	205	0.0	0.0	3.6	4.1	7.7	1.6	1.3	29.3
2023	Port Adelaide	25	4	0	0	13	22	35	6	9	74	0.0	0.0	3.3	5.5	8.8	1.5	2.3	8.8
Career			11	0	0	38	51	89	17	18	279	0.0	0.0	3.5	4.6	8.1	1.6	1.6	25.4
