= Travis Boak =

Australian rules footballer (born 1988)

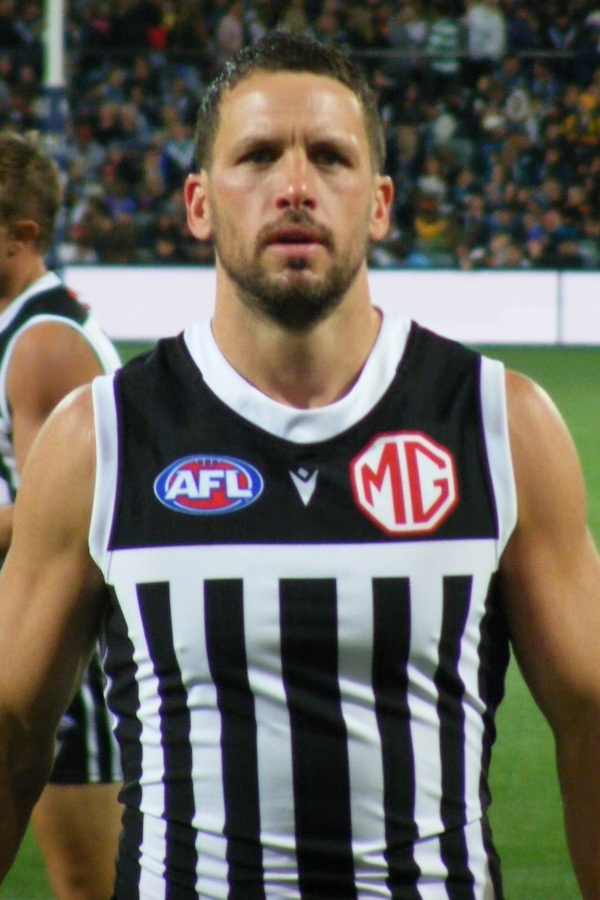
- Boak playing for Port Adelaide in 2023

Personal information
- Full name: Travis Alexander Boak
- Born: 1 August 1988 (age 38); Geelong, Victoria
- Original team: Geelong Falcons (TAC Cup)
- Draft: No. 5, 2006 national draft
- Debut: Round 12, 2007, Port Adelaide vs. Essendon, at AAMI Stadium
- Height: 184 cm (6 ft 0 in)
- Weight: 85 kg (187 lb)
- Position: Midfielder

Playing career
Years	Club	Games (Goals)
2007–2025	Port Adelaide	387 (215)

Representative team honours
Years	Team	Games (Goals)
2020	Victoria	1 (0)

International team honours
2014, 2017	Australia	3 (0)

Career highlights
- Port Adelaide captain: 2013–2018; Port Adelaide games record holder; 3× All-Australian team: 2013, 2014, 2020; 2× John Cahill Medal: 2011, 2019; 3× Showdown Medal: 2013 (game 1), 2020, 2021 (game 1); 3× Peter Badcoe VC Medal: 2014, 2015, 2019; AFL Rising Star nominee: 2007

Travis Alexander Boak (born 1 August 1988) is a former professional Australian rules footballer who played for the Port Adelaide Football Club in the Australian Football League (AFL). Boak captained the club from 2013 to 2018, and is a three-time All-Australian, dual John Cahill Medallist and three-time Showdown Medallist. He is Port Adelaide's games record holder with 387 games, as well as the holder of the record for most VFL/AFL games played without winning a premiership.

== AFL playing career ==
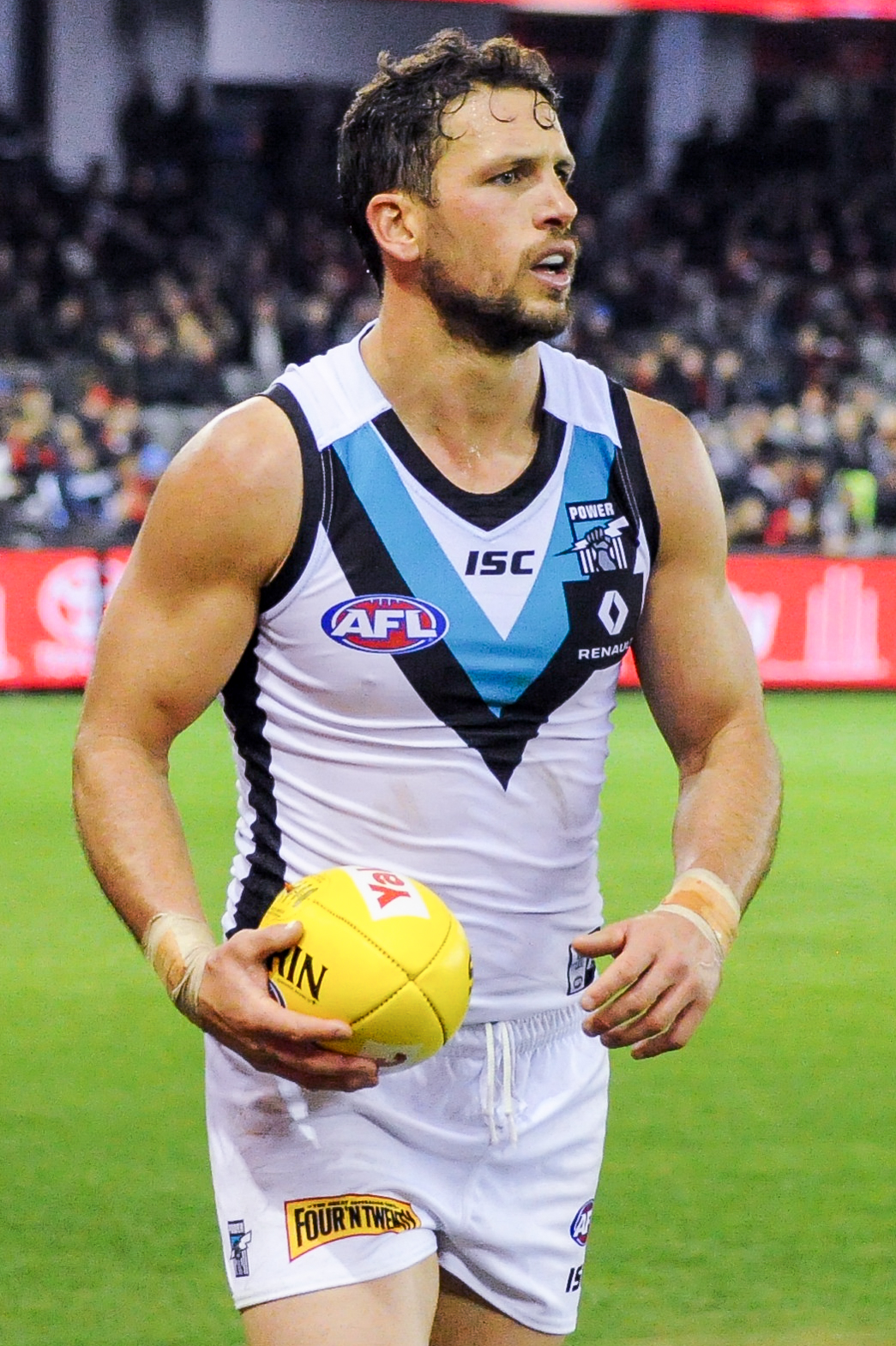
Boak playing in 2017

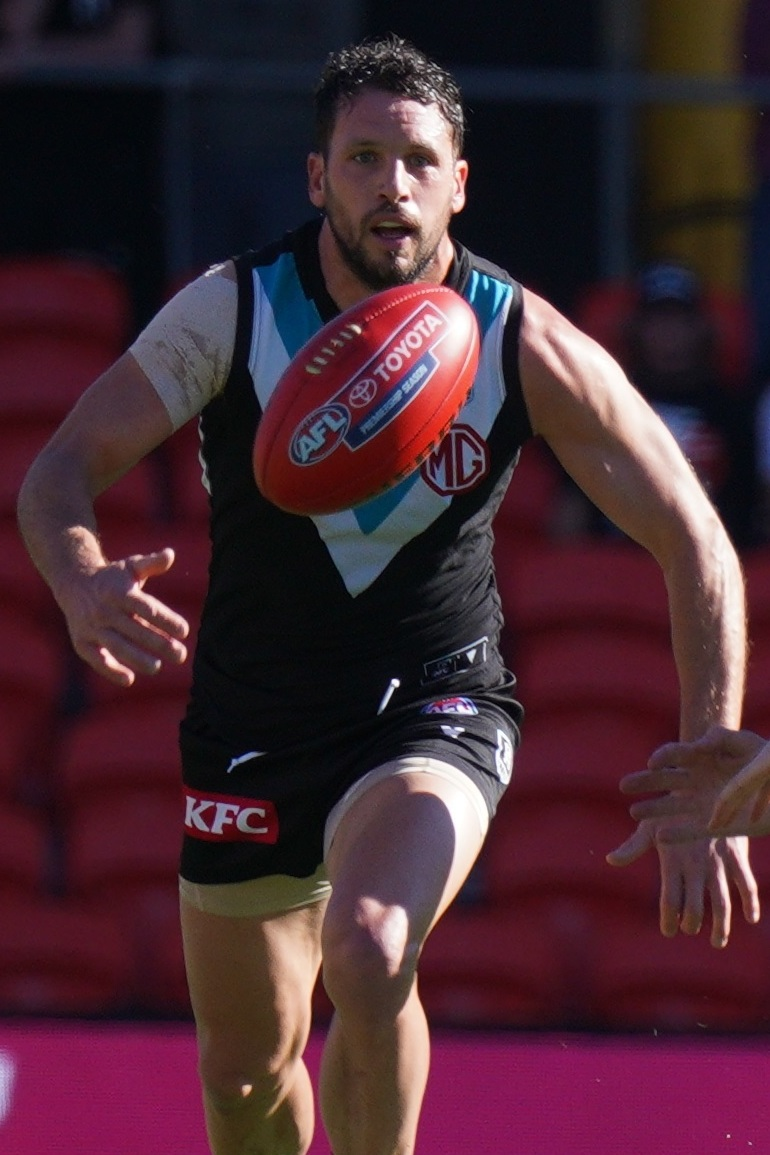
Boak playing in 2021

Boak was selected with Port Adelaide's first selection and fifth overall in the 2006 AFL draft from the Geelong Falcons in the TAC Cup. He made his AFL debut in a 31-point victory in round 12 of the 2007 season against Essendon. Boak continued to rise since his debut, accumulating 23 possessions against the Western Bulldogs in only his third match. The following week, against Richmond, Boak kicked his first ever AFL goal. In round 19 against Carlton, he earned a NAB Rising Star nomination for his 28 possessions and 2 goals. Boak went on to play in the Port Adelaide team which competed in the 2007 AFL Grand Final against Geelong, losing by a record margin. At the start of 2008, Boak picked up where he left off, playing a greater role in the Port Adelaide midfield alongside senior players such as Domenic Cassisi, Kane Cornes and Shaun Burgoyne. He played in 17 games and averaged 20.1 disposals. Boak continued to improve in 2009 winning the Gavin Wanganeen Medal and averaging 23.7 disposals for the season.

The 2010 season was Boak's best season to date with a career best average of 23 possessions per game. His season ended with a flourish when he kicked three goals in each of the final two rounds. He became the first-tagged player in the Port Adelaide midfield and finished the season with 16 Brownlow Medal votes. The 2011 season saw Boak play in 21 games and lead the club in disposals (458), clearances (79) and inside 50s (85). He along with Jackson Trengove were jointly crowned the John Cahill Medallist, the first time that there had been a tie at the club's best and fairest award since 1893.

For the 2013 season, Boak was announced as the captain of the club, therefore replacing his number 10 guernsey with number 1, in accordance with Port Adelaide tradition. 2013 was considered to be Boak's best AFL season up to that point, with an average of 25.3 disposals a game, and kicking a season best of 20 goals. He was named in the 2013 All-Australian team. In 2014, Boak continued where he left off from 2013, averaging a career best 26.6 disposals a game and tolling a season best 21 Brownlow votes to finish equal 4th. He was named in the 2014 All-Australian team, his second consecutive selection.

Boak shifted between the midfield and half-forward over the following few seasons. In 2019, after stepping down from the captaincy at the end of the previous season, Boak made a permanent shift back to the midfield, enjoying career-best numbers. He played his 250th match in the Power's loss to Collingwood in round 7, becoming the fourth player to play 250 AFL matches for the club. Boak would go on to win his second John Cahill Medal after averaging a career-best 30 disposals, before having a shoulder operation in the off-season.

Upon the resumption of the 2020 season after it was curtailed due to the COVID-19 pandemic, Boak gathered 24 disposals and a goal in Port Adelaide's record-breaking 75-point Showdown win in round 2 to win his second Showdown Medal. He went on to have a career-best season, earning selection as vice-captain in the 2020 All-Australian team and finishing second and third respectively in votes for the Leigh Matthews Trophy and AFLCA champion player of the year award. He also finished as runner-up in the 2020 Brownlow Medal with an equal-career-high 21 votes, ten votes behind winner Lachie Neale.

Boak played his 300th match, also against Collingwood, in round 19 of the 2021 season; he recorded 30 disposals as he equalled the club's AFL games record held by Kane Cornes. The next week he broke the club record in a 27-point win over GWS. Following the 2021 home-and-away season, Boak was awarded the Jim Stynes Community Leadership Award as recognition for his work with the Childhood Cancer Association. Following almost 12 years of work with the association, Boak regularly volunteers his time to visit children and teens in hospitals. He played a key role in raising more than $1m annually via their ‘Captain for a Day’ experiences, which allows a young patient to experience the inner sanctum of the Port Adelaide Football Club.

On 4 August 2025, Boak announced his retirement from the AFL at the end of the season after 19 seasons.

== Statistics ==
Legend
G	Goals	K	Kicks	D	Disposals	T	Tackles
B	Behinds	H	Handballs	M	Marks

Season	Team	No.	Games	Totals							Averages (per game)							Votes
Season	Team	No.	Games	G	B	K	H	D	M	T	G	B	K	H	D	M	T	Votes
2007	Port Adelaide	10	14	4	3	101	124	225	51	38	0.3	0.2	7.2	8.9	16.1	3.6	2.7	0
2008	Port Adelaide	10	17	9	4	175	167	342	88	64	0.5	0.2	10.3	9.8	20.1	5.2	3.8	2
2009	Port Adelaide	10	18	7	5	223	204	427	81	73	0.4	0.3	12.4	11.3	23.7	4.5	4.1	5
2010	Port Adelaide	10	20	13	12	247	207	454	70	122	0.7	0.6	12.4	10.4	22.7	3.5	6.1	16
2011	Port Adelaide	10	21	12	6	236	222	458	76	98	0.6	0.3	11.2	10.6	21.8	3.6	4.7	4
2012	Port Adelaide	10	18	9	11	239	186	425	47	66	0.5	0.6	13.3	10.3	23.6	2.6	3.7	6
2013	Port Adelaide	1	23	20	13	315	266	581	99	96	0.9	0.6	13.7	11.6	25.3	4.3	4.2	13
2014	Port Adelaide	1	24	19	6	266	378	644	88	92	0.8	0.3	11.1	15.8	26.8	3.7	3.8	21
2015	Port Adelaide	1	22	13	14	252	310	562	70	120	0.6	0.6	11.5	14.1	25.5	3.2	5.5	16
2016	Port Adelaide	1	22	17	10	252	274	526	68	103	0.8	0.5	11.5	12.5	23.9	3.1	4.7	7
2017	Port Adelaide	1	22	19	13	227	268	495	105	99	0.9	0.6	10.3	12.2	22.5	4.8	4.5	10
2018	Port Adelaide	1	22	19	13	238	243	481	86	94	0.9	0.6	10.8	11.0	21.9	3.9	4.3	2
2019	Port Adelaide	10	21	10	13	306	331	637	70	102	0.5	0.6	14.6	15.8	30.3	3.3	4.9	16
2020 (Note: The 2020 season was played with 17 home-and-away matches per team (down from 22) and 16-minute quarters with time on (down from 20-minute quarters with time on) due to the impact of the COVID-19 pandemic.)	Port Adelaide	10	19	8	8	217	218	435	51	72	0.4	0.4	11.4	11.5	22.9	2.7	3.8	21
2021	Port Adelaide	10	23	8	18	305	335	640	67	110	0.3	0.8	13.3	14.6	27.8	2.9	4.8	25
2022	Port Adelaide	10	21	10	10	250	312	562	86	85	0.5	0.5	11.9	14.9	26.8	4.1	4.0	10
2023	Port Adelaide	10	21	7	6	173	162	335	60	58	0.3	0.3	8.2	7.7	16.0	2.9	2.8	0
2024	Port Adelaide	10	23	5	17	248	171	419	115	67	0.2	0.7	10.8	7.4	18.2	5.0	2.9	0
2025	Port Adelaide	10	16	6	6	143	185	328	67	52	0.4	0.4	8.9	11.6	20.5	4.2	3.3	0
Career			387	215	188	4413	4563	8976	1445	1611	0.6	0.5	11.4	11.8	23.2	3.7	4.2	174

== Honours and achievements ==
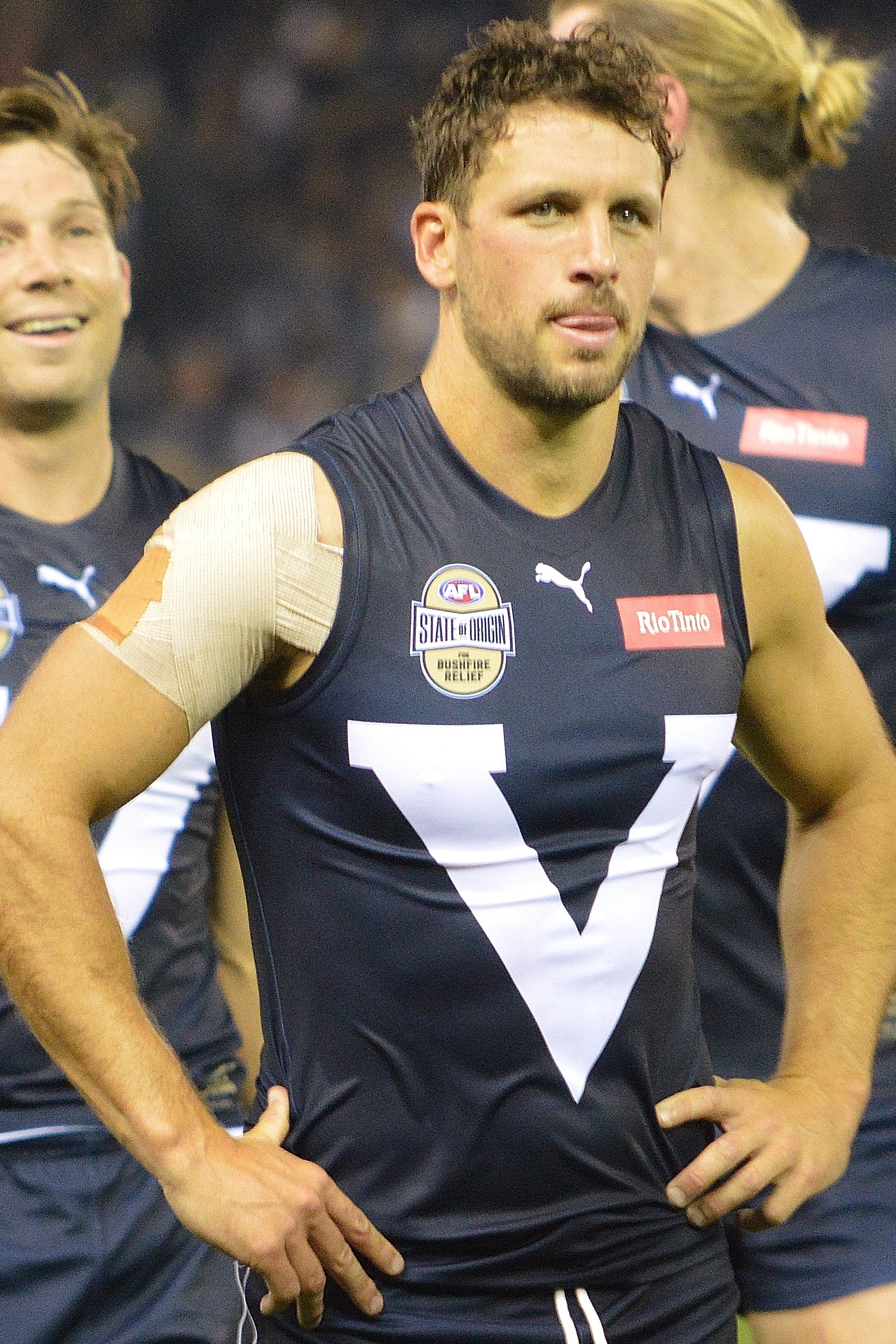
Boak representing Victoria in the State of Origin for Bushfire Relief Match in 2020

Team

- AFL minor premiership/McClelland Trophy (Port Adelaide): 2020

Individual

- Port Adelaide captain: 2013–2018
- Port Adelaide games record holder
- 3× All-Australian team: 2013, 2014, 2020
- 2× John Cahill Medal: 2011, 2019
- 2× Australia representative honours in international rules football: 2014, 2017
- Victoria representative honours in State of Origin for Bushfire Relief Match
- 3× Showdown Medal: 2013 (game 1), 2020, 2021 (game 1)
- 3× Peter Badcoe VC Medal: 2014, 2015, 2019
- AFL Rising Star nominee: 2007

== Off-field ==
In October 2025, Boak joined the Carlton Football Club in a part-time leadership and culture role.
