= Ray Sault =

Australian rules footballer

Personal information
- Full name: Ray Sault
- Born: 29 July 1952 (age 74)
- Original team: Koroit
- Height: 187 cm (6 ft 2 in)
- Weight: 85 kg (187 lb)
- Position: Defence

Playing career^{1}
Years	Club	Games (Goals)
1971–76	Fitzroy	41 (6)
- ^{1} Playing statistics correct to the end of 1976.

Ray Sault (born 29 July 1952) is a former Australian rules footballer who played with Fitzroy in the Victorian Football League (VFL).
