= Martin Frederick =

Australian rules footballer

Personal information
- Full name: Manguru Frederick
- Born: 17 May 2000 (age 26); Adelaide, South Australia
- Original teams: Woodville-West Torrens, SANFL
- Draft: Category B Rookie selection, 2018 national draft
- Height: 178 cm (5 ft 10 in)
- Weight: 80 kg (176 lb)
- Position: Defender

Club information
- Current club: Port Adelaide
- Number: 45

Playing career^{1}
| Years | Club | Games (Goals) |
| 2021–2022 | Port Adelaide | 14 (2) |
| 2023, 2025– | Sturt | 30 (8) |
| 2024 | Claremont | 19 (4) |
- ^{1} Playing statistics correct to the end of round 8, 2025.

Career highlights
- SANFL premiership player: 2025

Manguru "Martin" Frederick (born 17 May 2000) is an Australian rules footballer of Sudanese descent who played for Port Adelaide in the Australian Football League (AFL).

He made his AFL debut in Round 6 of the 2021 AFL season against St Kilda at Adelaide Oval. Delisted by Port Adelaide in 2022, played for Sturt in the South Australian National Football League in 2023. In 2024 he played for Claremont in the West Australian Football League and returned to play for Sturt in 2025.

He is the twin brother of Minairo "Michael" Frederick, who plays for Fremantle.
