= Karl Amon =

Australian rules footballer (born 1995)

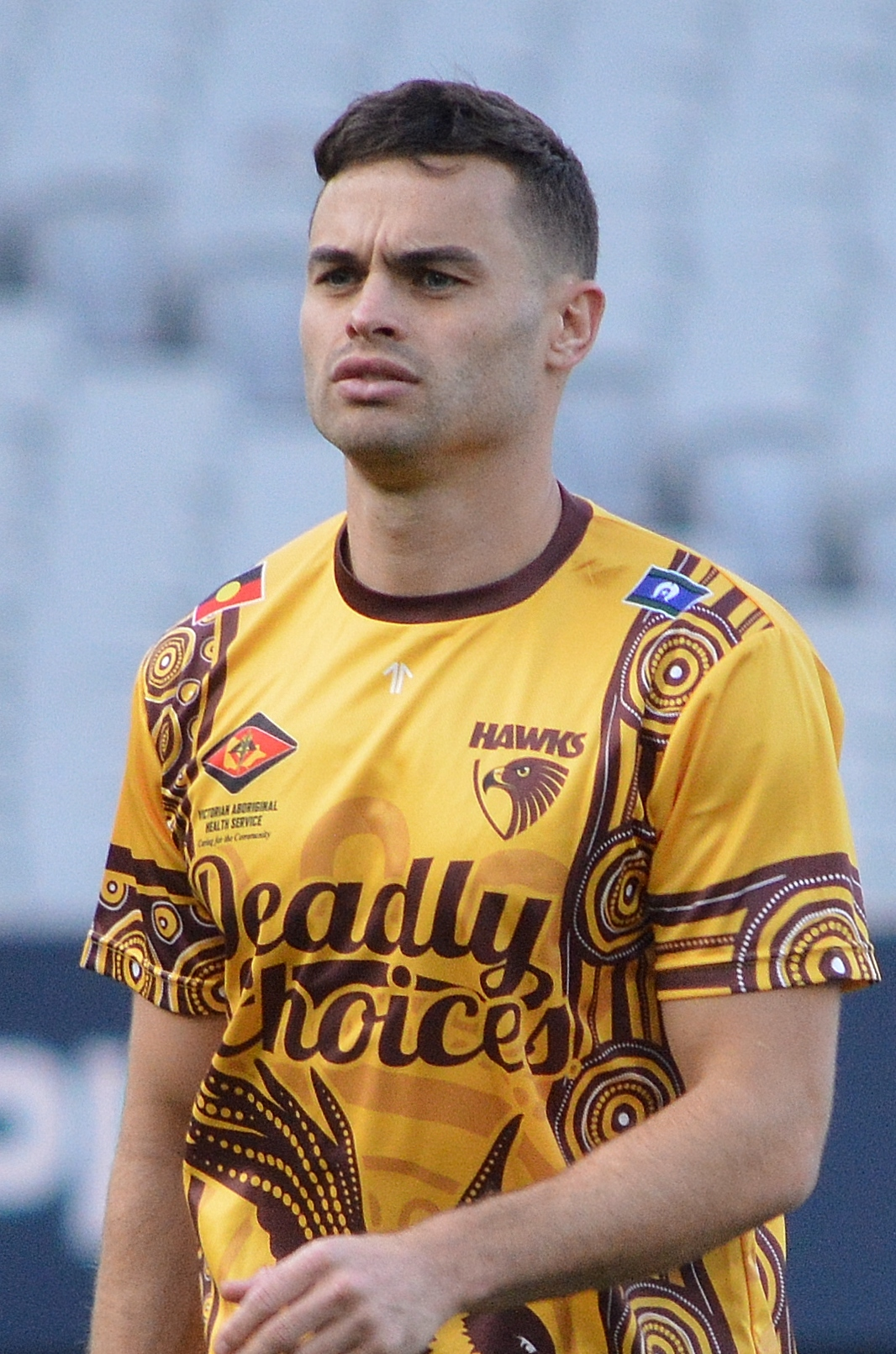
- Amon pre-match with Hawthorn in 2026

Personal information
- Full name: Karl Amon
- Born: 19 August 1995 (age 31); Melbourne, Victoria
- Original team: Sandringham Dragons (TAC Cup)
- Draft: No. 68, 2013 national draft
- Debut: Round 7, 2015, Port Adelaide vs. Brisbane Lions, at the Gabba
- Height: 181 cm (5 ft 11 in)
- Weight: 77 kg (170 lb)
- Positions: Midfielder, Defender

Club information
- Current club: Hawthorn
- Number: 10

Playing career^{1}
Years	Club	Games (Goals)
2014–2022	Port Adelaide	124 (55)
2023–	Hawthorn	91 (17)
Total		215 (72)

Representative team honours^{2}
Years	Team	Games (Goals)
2025	Indigenous All-Stars	1 (0)
- ^{1} Playing statistics correct to the end of 2026.^{2} Representative statistics correct as of 2025.

Karl Amon (born 19 August 1995) is an Australian rules footballer playing for the Hawthorn Football Club in the Australian Football League (AFL). He previously played for the Port Adelaide Football Club from 2014 to 2022.

== Early life ==
Amon was born and raised in Melbourne to mother Katrina, an Aboriginal woman from Stradbroke Island in Queensland. He grew up in the suburb of Sandringham.

At the age of five, Amon was diagnosed with Perthes disease, undergoing several operations, including five on his hip. Between the ages of 5 and 8, he was regularly in hospital and spent a year in a wheelchair followed by a year on crutches. Karl Amon played his junior football at the East Sandringham Zebras and later Hampton Rovers Football Club and also played one senior VAFA game at the football club he was participating in at that time.

Amon was a member of the Flying Boomerangs Under 15 team. He played U18 football with the Sandringham Dragons in the TAC Cup.

== AFL career ==
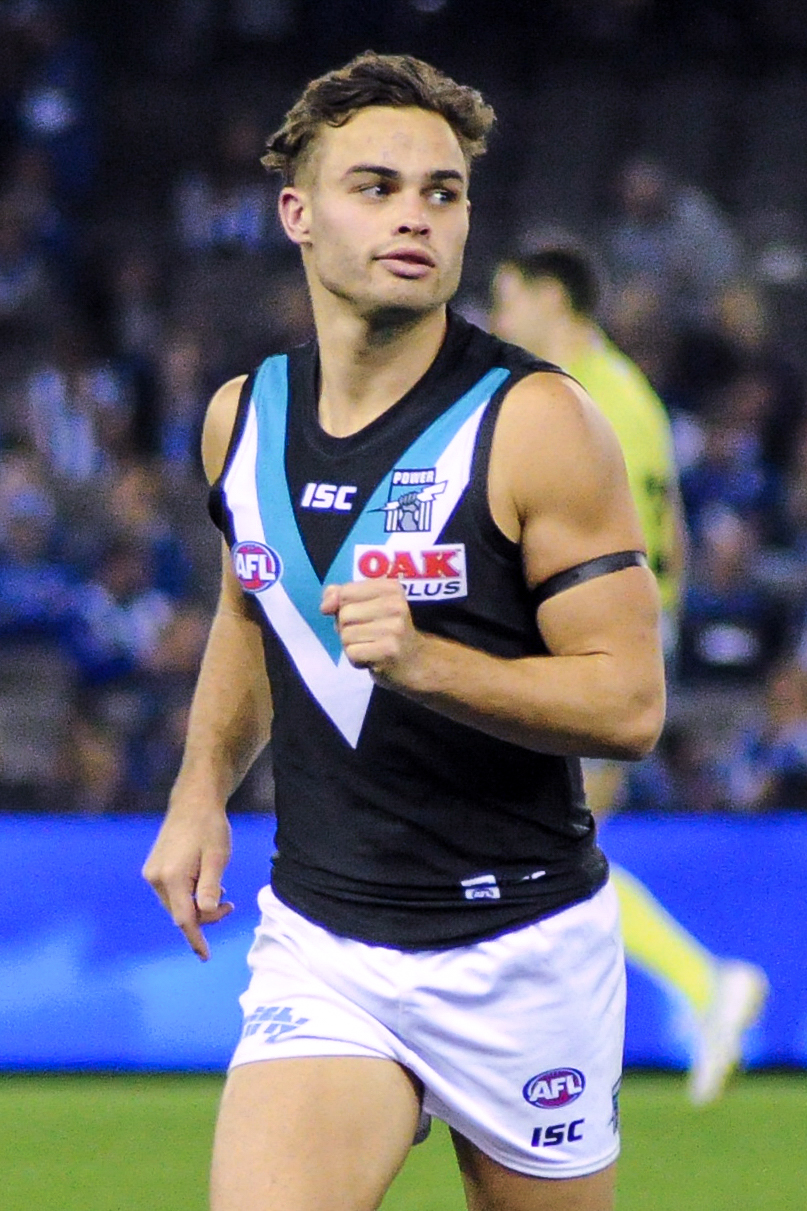
Amon playing for Port Adelaide in 2018

=== Port Adelaide (2014–2022) ===
Amon was drafted by Port Adelaide with the 68th selection in the 2013 AFL draft.

Amon built up his form at SANFL level in 2014, picking up more of the ball and improving his skill level under pressure. He made his senior debut in round 7, 2015 against the Brisbane Lions at the Gabba, where he gathered 9 disposals and kicked a goal. He played 7 matches for the season, being a substitute in 5 of them. In one of his two full games against the Gold Coast Suns, he had 16 possessions and kicked 3 goals.

After an injured-ravaged 2018 season, Amon returned in 2019 and cemented his spot in the senior side, playing 73 games in a row from mid-2019 to the end of 2022.

=== Hawthorn (2023–present) ===
At the end of the 2022 season, Amon opted to exercise his rights as a free agent and moved to Hawthorn.

== Statistics ==
Updated to the end of 2026.

Legend
G	Goals	K	Kicks	D	Disposals	T	Tackles
B	Behinds	H	Handballs	M	Marks

Season	Team	No.	Games	Totals							Averages (per game)							Votes
Season	Team	No.	Games	G	B	K	H	D	M	T	G	B	K	H	D	M	T	Votes
2015	Port Adelaide	15	7	5	3	48	25	73	17	17	0.7	0.4	6.9	3.6	10.4	2.4	2.4	0
2016	Port Adelaide	15	15	10	6	134	77	211	45	38	0.7	0.4	8.9	5.1	14.1	3.0	2.5	0
2017	Port Adelaide	15	14	5	5	153	109	262	58	34	0.4	0.4	10.9	7.8	18.7	4.1	2.4	0
2018	Port Adelaide	15	6	2	0	46	46	92	14	10	0.3	0.0	7.7	7.7	15.3	2.3	1.7	0
2019	Port Adelaide	15	17	9	11	188	146	334	63	52	0.5	0.6	11.1	8.6	19.6	3.7	3.1	1
2020 (Note: The 2020 season was played with 17 home-and-away matches per team (down from 22) and 16-minute quarters with time on (down from 20-minute quarters with time on) due to the impact of the COVID-19 pandemic.)	Port Adelaide	15	19	5	8	199	107	306	58	55	0.3	0.4	10.5	5.6	16.1	3.1	2.9	1
2021	Port Adelaide	15	24	11	17	370	196	566	141	98	0.5	0.7	15.4	8.2	23.6	5.9	4.1	11
2022	Port Adelaide	15	22	8	15	342	178	520	128	81	0.4	0.7	15.5	8.1	23.6	5.8	3.7	15
2023	Hawthorn	10	21	9	2	326	160	486	113	37	0.4	0.1	15.5	7.6	23.1	5.4	1.8	2
2024	Hawthorn	10	25	4	2	425	127	552	143	50	0.2	0.1	17.0	5.1	22.1	5.7	2.0	3
2025	Hawthorn	10	25	4	3	426	174	600	116	53	0.2	0.1	17.0	7.0	24.0	4.6	2.1	2
2026	Hawthorn	10	20	0	5	290	121	411	104	41	0.0	0.3	14.5	6.1	20.6	5.2	2.1	0
Career			215	72	77	2947	1466	4413	1000	566	0.3	0.4	13.7	6.8	20.5	4.7	2.6	35

== Honours and achievements ==
Team

- AFL minor premiership/McClelland Trophy (Port Adelaide): 2020
- McClelland Trophy (Hawthorn): 2024

Representative

- Indigenous All-Stars representative honours in All-Stars match: 2025
