= Willem Drew =

Australian rules footballer

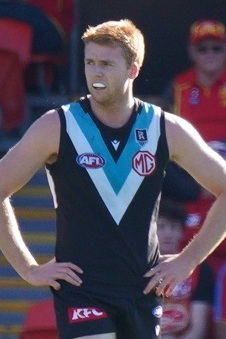
- Drew in 2021

Personal information
- Born: 1 October 1998 (age 28)
- Original team: North Ballarat Rebels (TAC Cup)/Koroit
- Draft: No. 33, 2016 AFL draft, Port Adelaide
- Debut: 23 March 2019, Port Adelaide Football Club
- Height: 188 cm (6 ft 2 in)
- Weight: 87 kg (192 lb)
- Position: Midfielder

Club information
- Current club: Port Adelaide
- Number: 28

Playing career^{1}
Years	Club	Games (Goals)
2017–	Port Adelaide	151 (23)
- ^{1} Playing statistics correct to the end of round 22, 2026.

Career highlights
- Peter Badcoe VC Medal, 2024

Willem Drew (born 1 October 1998) is a professional Australian rules footballer who plays for the Port Adelaide Football Club in the Australian Football League (AFL). He was recruited by Port Adelaide with the 33rd draft pick in the 2016 AFL draft. He is the cousin of former Essendon player Martin Gleeson, and the nephew of Adrian Gleeson.

== AFL career ==
Drew made his AFL debut in Port Adelaide's win over Melbourne in the opening round of the 2019 AFL season.

== Statistics ==
Updated to the end of round 22, 2026.

Legend
G	Goals	K	Kicks	D	Disposals	T	Tackles
B	Behinds	H	Handballs	M	Marks

Season	Team	No.	Games	Totals							Averages (per game)							Votes
Season	Team	No.	Games	G	B	K	H	D	M	T	G	B	K	H	D	M	T	Votes
2019	Port Adelaide	28	10	2	1	72	87	159	22	56	0.2	0.1	7.2	8.7	15.9	2.2	5.6	0
2021	Port Adelaide	28	24	4	4	177	247	424	52	164	0.2	0.2	7.4	10.3	17.7	2.2	6.8	0
2022	Port Adelaide	28	22	4	1	146	246	392	58	112	0.2	0.0	6.6	11.2	17.8	2.6	5.1	0
2023	Port Adelaide	28	25	5	9	203	231	434	62	166	0.2	0.4	8.1	9.2	17.4	2.5	6.6	0
2024	Port Adelaide	28	26	4	7	283	220	503	93	159	0.2	0.3	10.9	8.5	19.3	3.6	6.1	0
2025	Port Adelaide	28	23	2	7	186	232	418	50	150	0.1	0.3	8.1	10.1	18.2	2.2	6.5	0
2026	Port Adelaide	28	21	2	1	216	179	395	57	115	0.1	0.0	10.3	8.5	18.8	2.7	5.5	0
Career			151	23	30	1283	1442	2725	394	922	0.2	0.2	8.5	9.5	18.0	2.6	6.1	0
