= Joel Garner (footballer) =

Australian rules footballer (born 1999)

Personal information
- Nickname: Big Bird
- Born: 21 May 1999 (age 27)
- Original team: Eastern Ranges (TAC Cup)
- Draft: No. 60, 2017 AFL draft, Port Adelaide
- Height: 184 cm (6 ft 0 in)
- Weight: 83 kg (183 lb)
- Position: Defender

Playing career^{1}
Years	Club	Games (Goals)
2018–2021	Port Adelaide	4 (0)
- ^{1} Playing statistics correct to the end of 2019.

Joel Garner (born 21 May 1999) is an Australian rules footballer who currently plays for the Richmond Football Club in the Victorian Football League (VFL). He previously played professionally for Port Adelaide in the Australian Football League (AFL) after being recruited with the 60th draft pick in the 2017 AFL draft.

== Career ==
Garner made his AFL debut in Port Adelaide's win over Gold Coast in the round 9 of the 2019 AFL season.

In November 2023, Garner joined Richmond's reserves team in the Victorian Football League (VFL) for the 2024 season.
