= Adrian Gleeson =

Australian rules footballer

Personal information
- Nickname: Bear
- Born: 29 April 1967 (age 59)
- Original team: Koroit
- Debut: Round 7, 1986, Carlton vs. Collingwood, at Victoria Park
- Height: 178 cm (5 ft 10 in)
- Weight: 78 kg (172 lb)

Playing career^{1}
Years	Club	Games (Goals)
1986–1996	Carlton	176 (174)
- ^{1} Playing statistics correct to the end of 1996.

Career highlights
- 1987 Carlton premiership team; 3rd in 1992 Best & Fairest; 1996 Reserves Best & Fairest Award; 1997 Reserves Best & Fairest Award

Adrian Gleeson (born 30 April 1967) is a former Australian rules footballer who played for Carlton in the Victorian Football League (VFL).

== Career ==
Gleeson, who played as a rover, finished eighth in the 1988 Brownlow Medal count, in his third season of league football.

Wearing the number 12 guernsey, Gleeson debuted for the Blues in round seven of 1986 in the 40-point victory over Collingwood in what was the last game between these two fierce rivals played at Victoria Park.

He was recruited from the Koroit Football Club in the Hampden Football League and was a member of Carlton's 1987 premiership team

Gleeson played 176 games and kicked 174 goals between 1986 and 1996. He was a popular player at Carlton and coach David Parkin described the decision to delist Gleeson at the end of the 1996 season as one of the toughest of his coaching career.

== Honors ==
He was rewarded with life membership of the club and was later appointed to the Carlton Board of Directors in May 2006.
