= Jackson Mead =

Australian rules footballer (born 2001)

Personal information
- Full name: Jackson Mead
- Born: 30 November 2001 (age 24); Adelaide, South Australia
- Original teams: Woodville-West Torrens (SANFL); SMOSH West Lakes (AdFL)
- Draft: No. 25 (F/S), 2019 national draft
- Debut: Round 1, 2022, Port Adelaide vs. Brisbane Lions, at the Gabba
- Height: 184 cm (6 ft 0 in)
- Weight: 83 kg (183 lb)
- Position: Midfielder

Playing career^{1}
Years	Club	Games (Goals)
2020–2026	Port Adelaide	74 (13)
- ^{1} Playing statistics correct to the end of round 22, 2026.

Adelaide Football Club

Jackson Mead (born 30 September 2001) is a former professional Australian rules footballer who plays for the Port Adelaide Football Club in the Australian Football League (AFL).

He is the son of Port Adelaide's former SANFL and AFL footballer Darren Mead.

== AFL career ==
Mead was selected by Port Adelaide with the 25th overrall pick in the 2019 national draft, matching a bid from Sydney through's Mead's father-son eligibility. He became Port Adelaide's second father-son selection in the national draft following Brett Ebert in 2002. He made his AFL debut in round one of the 2022 season against the Brisbane Lions at the Gabba.

Mead's fifth season as a professional footballer became his breakout year, playing all 26 possible matches for Port Adelaide in 2024. He was rewarded with a two-year contract extension, keeping him at the club until at least the end of 2026.

At the end of the 2026 AFL season, Mead was delisted by Port Adelaide.

== Statistics ==
Updated to the end of round 22, 2026.

Legend
G	Goals	K	Kicks	D	Disposals	T	Tackles
B	Behinds	H	Handballs	M	Marks

Season	Team	No.	Games	Totals							Averages (per game)							Votes
Season	Team	No.	Games	G	B	K	H	D	M	T	G	B	K	H	D	M	T	Votes
2020 (Note: The 2020 season was played with 17 home-and-away matches per team (down from 22) and 16-minute quarters with time on (down from 20-minute quarters with time on) due to the impact of the COVID-19 pandemic.)	Port Adelaide	44	0	—	—	—	—	—	—	—	—	—	—	—	—	—	—	0
2021	Port Adelaide	44	0	—	—	—	—	—	—	—	—	—	—	—	—	—	—	0
2022	Port Adelaide	44	11	1	0	59	55	114	20	32	0.1	0.0	5.4	5.0	10.4	1.8	2.9	0
2023	Port Adelaide	44	7	2	1	32	20	52	12	18	0.3	0.1	4.6	2.9	7.4	1.7	2.6	0
2024	Port Adelaide	44	26	6	5	202	163	365	77	77	0.2	0.2	7.8	6.3	14.0	3.0	3.0	0
2025	Port Adelaide	44	20	3	4	133	131	264	54	57	0.2	0.2	6.7	6.6	13.2	2.7	2.9	0
2026	Port Adelaide	3	10	1	2	83	42	125	33	25	0.1	0.2	8.3	4.2	12.5	3.3	2.5	0
Career			74	13	12	509	411	920	196	209	0.2	0.2	6.9	5.6	12.4	2.6	2.8	0
