= Peter Ladhams =

Australian rules footballer (born 1998)

Personal information
- Full name: Peter Ladhams
- Nickname: The Peanut
- Born: 14 January 1998 (age 28); Papua New Guinea
- Original team: Norwood (SANFL)
- Draft: No. 9, 2017 rookie draft
- Debut: Round 10, 2019, Port Adelaide vs. Hawthorn, at York Park
- Height: 204 cm (6 ft 8 in)
- Weight: 101 kg (223 lb)
- Position: Ruck

Club information
- Current club: Sydney
- Number: 19

Playing career^{1}
| Years | Club | Games (Goals) |
| 2017–2021 | Port Adelaide | 32 (21) |
| 2022– | Sydney | 33 (14) |
| Total | | 65 (35) |
- ^{1} Playing statistics correct to the end of 2026.

Peter Ladhams (born 14 January 1998) is an Australian rules footballer who plays for the Sydney Swans in the Australian Football League (AFL).

== AFL career ==
=== Port Adelaide (2017–2021) ===
Ladhams was selected with Pick 9 in the rookie draft by Port Adelaide. After spending his first two seasons playing in the SANFL, Ladhams made his debut against Hawthorn in Round 10 of the 2019 AFL season. He kicked his first goal and behind in that game against Hawthorn.

In 2020, Ladhams was handed a three match suspension for breaching the AFL's COVID-19 protocols, after he and teammate Dan Houston had invited unauthorised visitors into their home.

=== Sydney (2022–present) ===
He was traded to Sydney at the end of the 2021 AFL season along with Pick 16 in the 2021 AFL draft for Pick 12 and a future third-round pick. Ladhams kicked his first goal for Sydney in their 63 point win against West Coast at Optus Stadium.

== Statistics ==
Updated to the end of round 22, 2026.

Legend
| G | Goals | K | Kicks | D | Disposals | T | Tackles |
| B | Behinds | H | Handballs | M | Marks | H/O | Hit-outs |

| Season | Team | No. | Games | Totals | | | | | | | | Averages (per game) | | | | | | | | Votes |
| Season | Team | No. | Games | G | B | K | H | D | M | T | H/O | G | B | K | H | D | M | T | H/O | Votes |
|---|---|---|---|---|---|---|---|---|---|---|---|---|---|---|---|---|---|---|---|---|
| 2019 | Port Adelaide | 38 | 5 | 2 | 2 | 32 | 41 | 73 | 9 | 10 | 74 | 0.4 | 0.4 | 6.4 | 8.2 | 14.6 | 1.8 | 2.0 | 14.8 | 0 |
| 2020 (Note: The 2020 season was played with 17 home-and-away matches per team (down from 22) and 16-minute quarters with time on (down from 20-minute quarters with time on) due to the impact of the COVID-19 pandemic.) | Port Adelaide | 38 | 10 | 6 | 2 | 60 | 72 | 132 | 21 | 19 | 123 | 0.6 | 0.2 | 6.0 | 7.2 | 13.2 | 2.1 | 1.9 | 12.3 | 2 |
| 2021 | Port Adelaide | 38 | 17 | 13 | 5 | 129 | 102 | 231 | 58 | 40 | 228 | 0.8 | 0.3 | 7.6 | 6.0 | 13.6 | 3.4 | 2.4 | 13.4 | 0 |
| 2022 | Sydney | 19 | 11 | 2 | 4 | 82 | 81 | 163 | 29 | 16 | 226 | 0.2 | 0.4 | 7.5 | 7.4 | 14.8 | 2.6 | 1.5 | 20.5 | 4 |
| 2023 | Sydney | 19 | 9 | 4 | 1 | 75 | 62 | 137 | 29 | 18 | 182 | 0.4 | 0.1 | 8.3 | 6.9 | 15.2 | 3.2 | 2.0 | 20.2 | 0 |
| 2024 | Sydney | 19 | 1 | 0 | 1 | 3 | 3 | 6 | 2 | 2 | 10 | 0.0 | 1.0 | 3.0 | 3.0 | 6.0 | 2.0 | 2.0 | 10.0 | 0 |
| 2025 | Sydney | 19 | 10 | 7 | 4 | 56 | 51 | 107 | 21 | 12 | 100 | 0.7 | 0.4 | 5.6 | 5.1 | 10.7 | 2.1 | 1.2 | 10.0 | 0 |
| 2026 | Sydney | 19 | 2 | 1 | 0 | 14 | 15 | 29 | 3 | 3 | 45 | 0.5 | 0.0 | 7.0 | 7.5 | 14.5 | 1.5 | 1.5 | 22.5 | 0 |
| Career | | | 65 | 35 | 19 | 451 | 427 | 878 | 172 | 120 | 988 | 0.5 | 0.3 | 6.9 | 6.6 | 13.5 | 2.6 | 1.8 | 15.2 | 6 |
