= Miles Bergman =

Australian rules footballer

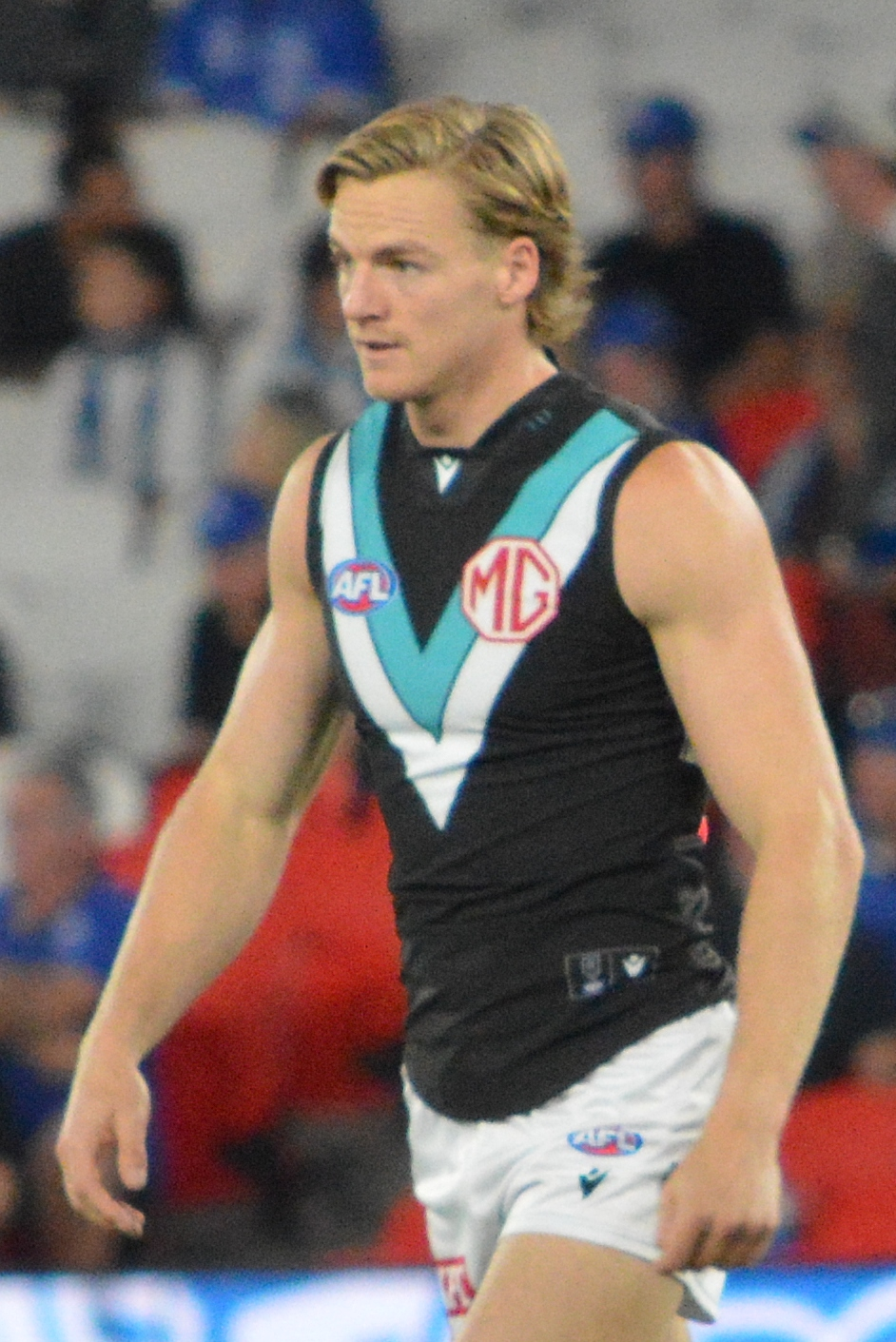
- Bergman in March 2026

Personal information
- Full name: Miles Bergman
- Born: 18 October 2001 (age 25)
- Original team: Sandringham Dragons (NAB League)
- Draft: No. 14, 2019 national draft
- Height: 189 cm (6 ft 2 in)
- Weight: 83 kg (183 lb)

Club information
- Current club: Port Adelaide
- Number: 14

Playing career^{1}
Years	Club	Games (Goals)
2021–	Port Adelaide	116 (30)
- ^{1} Playing statistics correct to the end of round 22, 2026.

Career highlights
- 22under22 team: 2023

Miles Bergman (born 18 October 2001) is an Australian rules footballer who plays for Port Adelaide in the Australian Football League (AFL). He made his AFL debut in Round 1 of the 2021 AFL season against North Melbourne at Marvel Stadium.

== Early life and junior career ==
Bergman's junior club was the Hampton Rovers Football Club in the Victorian Amateur Football Association. As a schoolboy for St Bede's College, he won the Neale Daniher Medal, being named best afield in the Herald Sun Shield. He played for the Sandringham Dragons in the NAB League U18's competition.

In Bergman's draft year, he was touted as a versatile mid-sized player and was considered "a top-10 bolter" by AFL Draft Central. At the 2019 national draft, Bergman was taken with Pick 14 for Port Adelaide.

== AFL career ==
Bergman was drafted as a mid-forward, though he has developed his game on both the wing and half-back. Bergman impressed after his Round 1 debut in 2021, and was later nominated for the Rising Star award in the Round 21 Showdown against Adelaide, collecting 23 disposals alongside 4 tackles. He played all but 1 game in the 2021 season.

== Statistics ==
Updated to the end of round 22, 2026.

Legend
G	Goals	K	Kicks	D	Disposals	T	Tackles
B	Behinds	H	Handballs	M	Marks

Season	Team	No.	Games	Totals							Averages (per game)							Votes
Season	Team	No.	Games	G	B	K	H	D	M	T	G	B	K	H	D	M	T	Votes
2021	Port Adelaide	14	23	7	7	199	126	325	101	42	0.3	0.3	8.7	5.5	14.1	4.4	1.8	0
2022	Port Adelaide	14	10	6	5	99	64	163	47	22	0.6	0.5	9.9	6.4	16.3	4.7	2.2	0
2023	Port Adelaide	14	24	3	8	225	106	331	115	57	0.1	0.3	9.4	4.4	13.8	4.8	2.4	0
2024	Port Adelaide	14	26	4	9	280	128	408	169	74	0.2	0.3	10.8	4.9	15.7	6.5	2.8	0
2025	Port Adelaide	14	19	6	3	232	106	338	97	69	0.3	0.2	12.2	5.6	17.8	5.1	3.6	2
2026	Port Adelaide	14	14	4	4	148	73	221	80	36	0.3	0.3	10.6	5.2	15.8	5.7	2.6	0
Career			116	30	36	1183	603	1786	609	300	0.3	0.3	10.2	5.2	15.4	5.3	2.6	2
