= Dylan Williams (Australian footballer) =

Australian rules footballer

Personal information
- Full name: Dylan Williams
- Born: 1 July 2001 (age 25)
- Original team: Oakleigh Chargers,
- Draft: No. 23, 2019 AFL draft
- Debut: Round 15, 2021, Port Adelaide vs. Sydney, at Adelaide Oval
- Height: 186 cm (6 ft 1 in)
- Weight: 82 kg (181 lb)
- Position: Defender

Playing career
Years	Club	Games (Goals)
2020–2025	Port Adelaide	29 (0)

Dylan Williams (born 1 July 2001) is a former professional Australian rules footballer who played for the Port Adelaide Football Club in the Australian Football League (AFL).

Williams played 29 AFL matches for Port Adelaide over six seasons, before being delisted at the end of the 2025 AFL season.

== Statistics ==
Legend
G	Goals	K	Kicks	D	Disposals	T	Tackles
B	Behinds	H	Handballs	M	Marks

Season	Team	No.	Games	Totals							Averages (per game)							Votes
Season	Team	No.	Games	G	B	K	H	D	M	T	G	B	K	H	D	M	T	Votes
2021	Port Adelaide	23	1	0	0	6	1	7	1	3	0.0	0.0	6.0	1.0	7.0	1.0	3.0	0
2023	Port Adelaide	23	21	0	1	247	65	312	101	16	0.0	0.0	11.8	3.1	14.9	4.8	0.8	0
2024	Port Adelaide	23	5	0	0	41	9	50	19	2	0.0	0.0	8.2	1.8	10.0	3.8	0.4	0
2025	Port Adelaide	23	2	0	0	8	1	9	2	2	0.0	0.0	4.0	0.5	4.5	1.0	1.0	0
Career			29	0	1	302	76	378	123	23	0.0	0.0	10.4	2.6	13.0	4.2	0.8	0
