= Scott Lycett =

Australian rules footballer

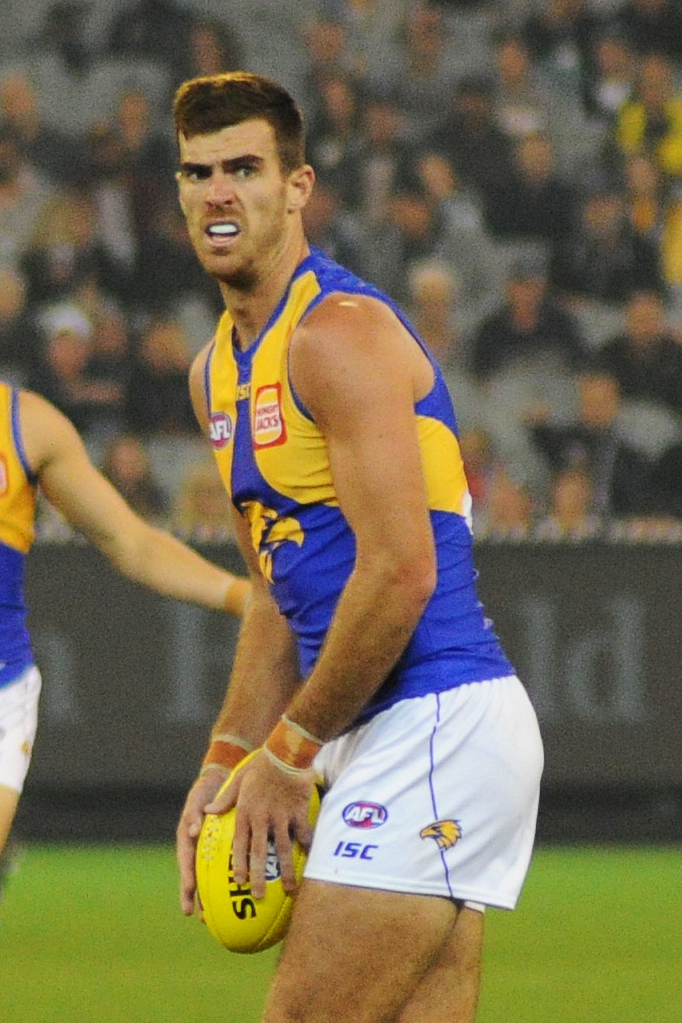
- Lycett playing for West Coast in April 2018.

Personal information
- Full name: Scott John Lycett
- Nicknames: Scooter, Ly-Chat
- Born: 26 September 1992 (age 34); Ceduna, South Australia
- Original team: Port Adelaide (SANFL)
- Draft: No. 29, 2010 national draft
- Height: 203 cm (6 ft 8 in)
- Weight: 102 kg (225 lb)
- Position: Ruckman / Forward

Playing career^{1}
Years	Club	Games (Goals)
2011–2018	West Coast	75 (45)
2019–2023	Port Adelaide	71 (16)
Total		146 (61)

Representative team honours^{2}
Years	Team	Games (Goals)
2020	All Stars	1 (0)
- ^{1} Playing statistics correct to the end of the semi finals, 2023.^{2} Representative statistics correct as of 2020.

Career highlights
- AFL premiership player: 2018

Scott John Lycett (born 26 September 1992) is a former professional Australian rules footballer who played for the West Coast Eagles and the Port Adelaide Football Club in the Australian Football League (AFL).

== Early career ==
Lycett played junior football for the Thevenard Magpies, playing one season in the team's senior side at the age of 15 before moving to Adelaide to play for Port Adelaide in the South Australian National Football League (SANFL). He played six matches in Port Adelaide's reserve side and eight games in the team's under-18 side, kicking 18 goals, before making his senior SANFL debut in round 3 of the 2010 season, against West Adelaide. Overall, he played six senior matches for Port Adelaide in 2010. Lycett played both under-16 and under-18 football for South Australia, playing five games at the AFL Under 18 Championships, recording 87 hit-outs.

== AFL career ==
Lycett was taken by the West Coast Eagles in the second round of the 2010 National Draft with pick #29. He was originally expected to be taken with pick #16 by Port Adelaide, but was overlooked by the club.

Lycett made his pre-season debut for the club in round one of the 2011 NAB Cup against Hawthorn.

He was assigned to Peel Thunder in the West Australian Football League (WAFL), making his debut in round 3 of the 2011 season against Claremont. He played 15 consecutive games from round 3 to round 18, kicking 12 goals.

Lycett made his debut for the West Coast Eagles in round 19, 2011, after both Josh Kennedy and Nic Naitanui withdrew due to injury. He kicked two goals on debut, including a goal with his first kick.

After playing in West Coast's 2018 premiership triumph, Lycett moved to Port Adelaide under the AFL's free agency rules.

During round 3 of the 2019 AFL season, Scott Lycett was charged with rough conduct. This was resulting in a $3000(AUD) fine.

== Statistics ==
Statistics are correct to the end of round 18 2019

Legend
G	Goals	K	Kicks	D	Disposals	T	Tackles
B	Behinds	H	Handballs	M	Marks	H/O	Hit-outs

Season	Team	No.	Games	Totals								Averages (per game)							
Season	Team	No.	Games	G	B	K	H	D	M	T	H/O	G	B	K	H	D	M	T	H/O
2011	West Coast	29	1	2	0	4	7	11	2	1	3	2.0	0.0	4.0	7.0	11.0	2.0	1.0	3.0
2012	West Coast	29	2	1	1	5	7	12	4	2	6	0.5	0.5	2.5	3.5	6.0	2.0	1.0	3.0
2013	West Coast	29	7	2	2	32	44	76	25	15	81	0.3	0.3	4.6	6.3	10.9	3.6	2.1	11.6
2014	West Coast	29	12	13	5	68	76	144	46	33	164	1.1	0.4	5.7	6.3	12.0	3.8	2.8	13.7
2015	West Coast	29	6	3	2	35	32	67	18	20	98	0.5	0.3	5.8	5.3	11.2	3.0	3.3	16.3
2016	West Coast	29	21	14	8	133	125	258	70	90	396	0.7	0.4	6.3	6.0	12.3	3.3	4.3	18.9
2017	West Coast	29	1	0	0	6	6	12	3	0	18	0.0	0.0	6.0	6.0	12.0	3.0	0.0	18.0
2018†	West Coast	29	25	10	10	167	145	312	69	83	502	0.4	0.4	6.7	5.8	12.5	2.8	3.3	20.1
2019	Port Adelaide	29	16	6	4	121	125	244	47	48	421	0.6	0.3	6.4	8.1	14.6	2.6	3.1	17.4
Career			91	51	32	569	567	1124	284	292	1687	0.6	0.4	6.0	6.1	12.1	3.1	3.1	17.4
