= 2026 Port Adelaide Football Club season =

Port Adelaide Football Club
2026 season
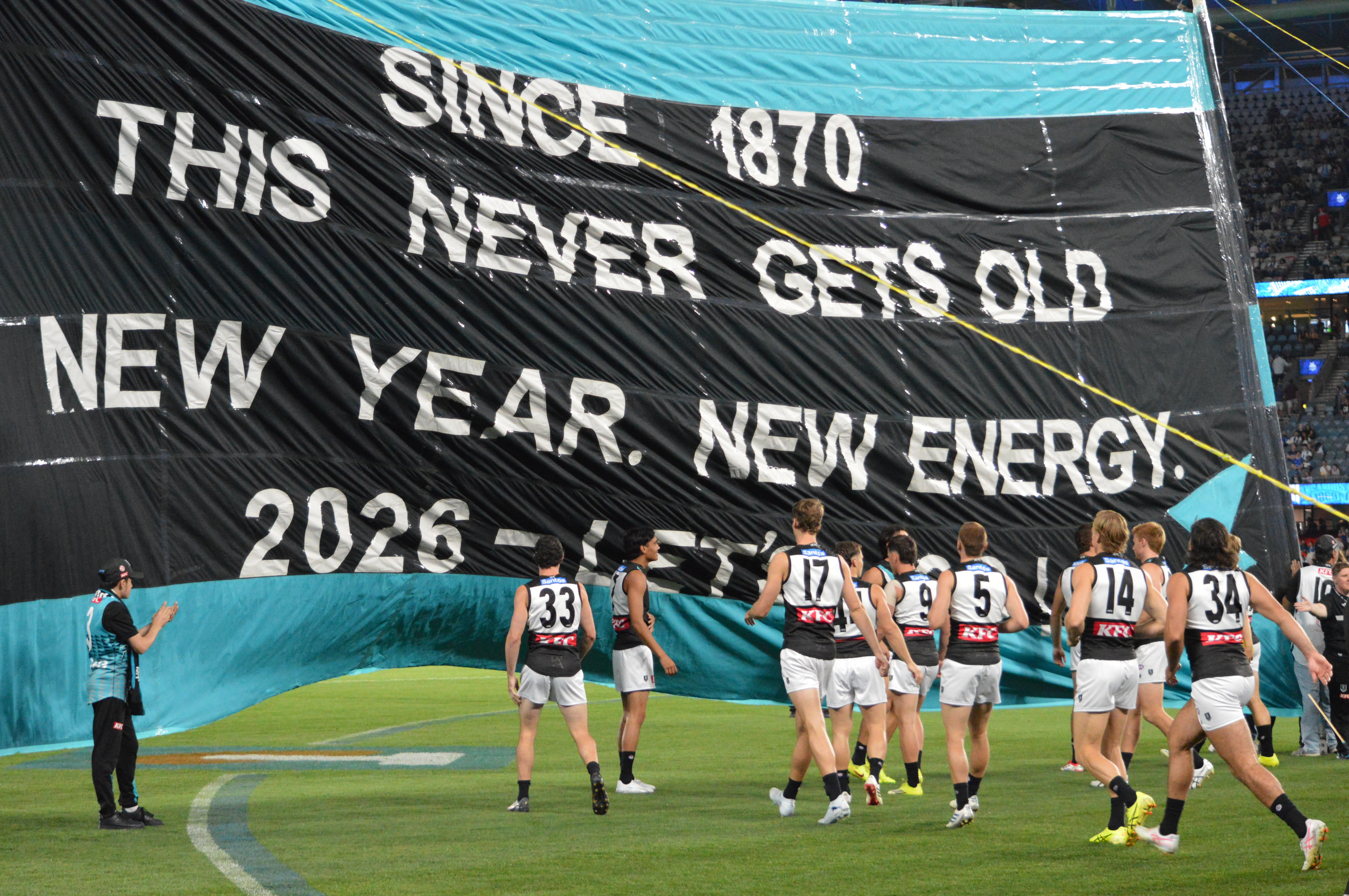
- Port Adelaide players enter the field ahead of their round 1 match against North Melbourne.

The 2026 Port Adelaide Football Club season was the club's 30th season in the Australian Football League (AFL) and the 156th year since its inception in 1870. The club also fielded its men's reserves team in the South Australian National Football League (SANFL) and its women's team in the AFL Women's (AFLW).

Port Adelaide entered the AFL season off the back of a nine-win and fourteen-loss 2025 season, in which the club finished in thirteenth position and did not qualify for the finals. It was former coach Ken Hinkley's final season as coach of the side. Former 2004 premiership player with the club Josh Carr was appointed coach of the team as part of a succession plan. The club endured a tough campaign that was significantly impacted by injuries and a lack of consistent player availability week-to-week, culminating in heavy late-season losses to Sydney and Melbourne. Nonetheless, the team was broadly competitive in most matches, ending the season with an equal-league record five losses by five-points or less and eight by no more than 14-points. Three-time John Cahill Medallist Zak Butters informed the club he would seek a trade to a Victorian-based team at the end of the season. Port Adelaide finished the year in fifteenth position, with seven wins and sixteen losses.

The club's fifth season in the AFL Women's competition was marked by middling form, with all six of their wins coming against teams ranked outside the top eight, the highlight of which being a fourteen-point victory over Showdown rivals Adelaide at Alberton Oval. Nonetheless, all six of their losses came against teams ranked above them on the ladder. Newly appointed coach Glenn Strachan, who took over from former manager Lauren Arnell, was unable to improve on the win-loss record of the previous season, as the team finished in ninth position, one win and significant percentage outside of finals qualification. Captain Justine Mules-Robinson retired from her playing career at the end of the season.

The reserves team suffered another disappointing season in the SANFL, winning only three games and losing sixteen, the worst win-loss record for a Port Adelaide Magpies team in the competition since the club moved to the AFL in 1997. Former defender with the club from 2004 to 2012 Jacob Surjan, became the SANFL side's fourth coach in five seasons. The side finished in tenth position, earning its second wooden spoon in three seasons. Club executives Matthew Richardson and David Koch both stated the club intended to leave the competition at the conclusion of the agreement governing its participation in the league in 2028.

== Overview ==
Port Adelaide's 2026 administration
Chair	CEO	Board									Ref
David Koch	Matthew Richardson	Grantley Stevens	Kevin Osborn	Cos Cardone	Holly Ransom	Greg Colombus	Tara Page	George Fiacchi	Tom Jonas	Charles Slattery	

Note: as of 1 July 2026

Port Adelaide's 2026 season overview
League	Captain	Coach	Home ground	W–L–D	Ladder	Finals	Best and fairest	Leading goalkicker	Ref
AFL	Connor Rozee	Josh Carr	Adelaide Oval	7–16–0	15th	DNQ	Jason Horne-Francis	Mitch Georgiades (51)	
AFLW	Justine Mules-Robinson	Glenn Strachan	Alberton Oval	6–6–0	9th	DNQ	TBC	Gemma Houghton (8)	
SANFL	Jez McLennan	Jacob Surjan	Alberton Oval	3–15–0	10th	DNQ	Will Lorenz	Xavier Walsh (23)	

== Squads ==
=== AFL ===
2026 Port Adelaide AFL squad
Senior list		Rookie list	Coaching staff
1 Connor Rozee (c); 2 Sam Powell-Pepper; 3 Jackson Mead; 4 Todd Marshall; 5 Joe Berry; 6 Kane Farrell; 7 Jase Burgoyne; 8 Josh Sinn; 9 Zak Butters (vc); 11 Christian Moraes; 12 Jack Lukosius; 13 Ivan Soldo; 14 Miles Bergman; 15 Jacob Wehr; 16 Ollie Wines; 17 Jack Whitlock; 18 Jason Horne-Francis	19 Mitch Georgiades; 21 Aliir Aliir; 24 Will Brodie; 24 Jordon Sweet; 25 Brandon Zerk-Thatcher; 27 Esava Ratugolea; 28 Willem Drew; 29 Thomas Anastasopoulos; 30 Ollie Lord; 33 Darcy Byrne-Jones; 34 Lachie Jones; 35 Joe Richards; 36 Will Lorenz; 38 Dante Visentini; 44 Corey Durdin; ?? Balyn O'Brien; ?? Mitch Zadow	22 Logan Evans; 26 Tom Cochrane; 31 Ewan Mackinlay; 32 Harrison Ramm; 40 Benny Barrett (B); 42 Jacob Moss (B); 43 Josh Lai; 45 Xavier Walsh; 50 Mani Liddy	Head coach: Josh Carr; Assistant coaches: Andy Collins; Mitch Clisby; Stuart Dew; Hamish Hartlett; Matthew Lobbe; Darren Reeves; Jacob Surjan; Cameron Sutcliffe; Luke Webster; Legend: (c) Captain(s); (vc) Vice-captain(s); (B) Category B rookie; italics - Inactive player list; Long-term injury; Updated: 1 November 2026; Source(s):

==== Arrivals ====
Name	Previous club	via	Ref.
Jacob Wehr	Greater Western Sydney	2025 free agency period	
Corey Durdin	Carlton	2025 trade period	
Will Brodie	Fremantle	2025 trade period	
Jack Watkins	Port Adelaide (SANFL)	2025 rookie draft	
Balyn O'Brien	Norwood (SANFL)	Pre-season supplemental selection period	
Mitch Zadow	East Fremantle (WAFL)	Pre-season supplemental selection period	

==== Departures ====
Name	Method of departure	Ref.
Rory Atkins	Retired	
Travis Boak	Retired	
Willie Rioli	Retired	
Ryan Burton	Delisted	
Jeremy Finlayson	Delisted	
Dylan Williams	Delisted	
Lachie Charleson	Delisted	
Hugh Jackson	Delisted	
Jed McEntee	Delisted	

=== AFLW ===
2026 Port Adelaide AFLW squad
Senior list		Coaching staff
1 Justine Mules-Robinson (c); 2 Ebony O'Dea; 3 Jasmine Evans; 4 Piper Window; 5 Abbey Dowrick; 6 Molly Brooksby; 8 Ashleigh Woodland; 9 Maria Moloney; 10 Indy Tahau; 11 Caitlin Wendland (i); 12 Ella Heads; 15 Julia Teakle (vc); 16 Shineah Goody; 17 Ella Boag; 18 Jemma Whittington-Charity	20 Sachi Syme; 21 Amelie Borg (vc); 22 Lauren Young; 27 Gemma Houghton; 28 Cheyenne Hammond; 29 Matilda Scholz; 30 Teagan Germech; 31 Chloe Gaunt; 32 Jasmine Sowden; 35 Kirsty Lamb; 44 Katelyn Pope; ?? Ellie Hampson; ?? Lucy Boyd; ?? Sophie Eaton; ?? Olivia Crane	Head coach: Lauren Arnell; Assistant coaches: Daniel Merrett (assistant coach); Sam Virgo (assistant coach); Sam Venning (development coach); Braedon Talbot (development coach); Legend: (c) Captain(s); (vc) Vice-captain(s); (i) Inactive player; Updated: 16 December 2025; Source(s):

==== Arrivals ====
Name	Previous club	via	Ref.
Ellie Hampson	Brisbane Lions	2025 trade period	
Lucy Boyd	West Coast	2025 trade period	
Sophie Eaton	Central District	2025 national draft	
Olivia Crane	Subiaco	2025 national draft	

==== Departures ====
Name	Method of departure	Ref.
Janelle Cuthbertson	Retired	
Alissa Brook	Delisted	
Coby Morgan	Delisted	
Jasmin Stewart	Delisted	
Lily Paterson	Traded to West Coast	

=== SANFL ===
2026 Port Adelaide Football Club SANFL squad
SANFL list (Note: Port Adelaide AFL-listed players (not selected to play AFL) are allowed to play for the SANFL squad.)		Coaching Staff
Nick Moore; Jez McLennan (c); Jake Weidemann; Rome Burgoyne; Dakota Sterzl; Douglas Cochrane; Nic Couroupis; Hugh Ferrari; Aidan Turner; Bailey Chamberlain; Kye Roberts; Heath Growden; Mac Bowman; Josh Byrne; Ryan Carnelly	Brad Thompson; Terrel Rigney; Dylan Whimpress; Kye Dean; Rory O'Driscoll; Tyran Hill; Michael Cavallaro; Harrison Elbrow; Keanu Miller; Kyan Smith; Cody Gilchrist; Thomas Griffiths; Fergus Kempe; Frazer Driscoll	Head coach: Jacob Surjan; Legend: (c) Captain(s); (vc) Vice-captain(s); Updated: 1 November 2026; Source(s):

== AFL season ==
=== Pre-season ===
**Date and time**	**Opponent**	**Scores** (Port Adelaide's scores indicated in **bold**)			**Venue**	**Ref.**
**Date and time**	**Opponent**	Home	Away	Result	**Venue**	**Ref.**
Friday, 20 February (5:30 pm)	Adelaide	**10.15 (75)**	14.10 (94)	Lost by 19 points	Alberton Oval (H)	
Sunday, 1 March (3:10 pm)	West Coast	9.13 (67)	**22.8 (140)**	Won by 73 points	Mineral Resources Park (A)	

=== Home-and-away season ===
**Rd**	**Date and time**	**Opponent**	**Scores** (Port Adelaide's scores indicated in **bold**)			**Venue**	**Attendance**	**Ladder**	**Ref.**
**Rd**	**Date and time**	**Opponent**	Home	Away	Result	**Venue**	**Attendance**	**Ladder**	**Ref.**
OR	Bye							–	
1	Sunday, 15 March (1:10 pm)	North Melbourne	17.11 (113)	**9.13 (67)**	Lost by 46 points	Marvel Stadium (A)	23,318	16th	
2	Sunday, 22 March (2:45 pm)	Essendon	**20.13 (133)**	10.10 (70)	Won by 63 points	Adelaide Oval (H)	36,049	7th	
3	Sunday, 29 March (12:00 pm)	West Coast	**13.12 (90)**	13.14 (92)	Lost by 2 points	Adelaide Oval (H)	33,754	11th	
4	Saturday, 4 April (4:15 pm)	Richmond	6.12 (48)	**13.12 (90)**	Won by 42 points	Melbourne Cricket Ground (A)	34,471	8th	
5	Sunday, 12 April (6:45 pm)	St Kilda	**9.13 (67)**	12.9 (81)	Lost by 14 points	Adelaide Oval (H)	47,319	10th	
6	Saturday, 18 April (4:15 pm)	Hawthorn	13.11 (89)	**13.8 (86)**	Lost by 3 points	Marvel Stadium (A)	37,070	12th	
7	Saturday, 25 April (6:05 pm)	Geelong	**13.17 (95)**	10.5 (65)	Won by 30 points	Adelaide Oval (H)	41,164	11th	
8	Friday, 1 May (7:40 pm)	Adelaide	11.10 (76)	**11.9 (75)**	Lost by 1 point	Adelaide Oval (A)	53,045	13th	
9	Friday, 8 May (7:40 pm)	Western Bulldogs	**10.12 (72)**	10.14 (74)	Lost by 2 points	Adelaide Oval (H)	33,883	14th	
10	Friday, 15 May (7:40 pm)	Gold Coast	15.8 (98)	**10.13 (73)**	Lost by 25 points	TIO Stadium (A)	11,974	14th	
11	Saturday, 23 May (7:05 pm)	Carlton	**8.10 (58)**	13.14 (92)	Lost by 34 points	Adelaide Oval (H)	40,597	14th	
12	Bye							16th	
13	Saturday, 6 June (6:15 pm)	West Coast	10.11 (71)	**11.11 (77)**	Won by 6 points	Optus Stadium (A)	47,479	15th	
14	Saturday, 13 June (7:05 pm)	Sydney	**13.12 (90)**	14.9 (93)	Lost by 3 points	Adelaide Oval (H)	31,350	15th	
15	Saturday, 20 June (7:35 pm)	Collingwood	11.12 (72)	**6.16 (52)**	Lost by 26 points	Melbourne Cricket Ground (A)	40,860	15th	
16	Saturday, 27 June (7:05 pm)	Adelaide	**13.19 (97)**	11.5 (71)	Won by 26 points	Adelaide Oval (H)	50,087	15th	
17	Sunday, 5 July (4:10 pm)	North Melbourne	**10.13 (73)**	7.10 (52)	Won by 21 points	Adelaide Oval (H)	33,105	15th	
18	Saturday, 11 July (1:15 pm)	St Kilda	13.9 (87)	**10.13 (73)**	Lost by 14 points	Marvel Stadium (A)	22,074	15th	
19	Saturday, 18 July (12:45 pm)	Fremantle	**11.9 (75)**	15.13 (103)	Lost by 28 points	Adelaide Oval (H)	28,727	15th	
20	Sunday, 26 July (1:10 pm)	Brisbane Lions	**19.12 (126)**	9.13 (67)	Lost by 59 points	Gabba (A)	30,722	15th	
21	Saturday, 1 August (6:05 pm)	Greater Western Sydney	**9.9 (63)**	10.15 (75)	Lost by 12 points	Adelaide Oval (H)	30,758	15th	
22	Saturday, 8 August (4:15 pm)	Sydney	26.11 (167)	**10.10 (70)**	Lost by 97 points	Sydney Cricket Ground (A)	40,014	15th	
23	Saturday, 15 August (7:40 pm)	Melbourne	**8.8 (56)**	20.12 (132)	Lost by 76 points	Adelaide Oval (H)	28,417	15th	
24	Sunday, 23 August (12:20 pm)	Essendon	14.11 (95)	**16.9 (105)**	Won by 10 points	Marvel Stadium (A)	29,200	15th	

=== Ladder ===
Pos	Team	Pld	W	L	D	PF	PA	PP	Pts	Qualification
1	Fremantle	23	19	4	0	2286	1666	137.2	76	Finals series
2	Sydney	23	18	5	0	2543	1869	136.1	72	Finals series
3	Brisbane Lions (P)	23	16	7	0	2499	2054	121.7	64	Finals series
4	Hawthorn	23	15	6	2	2260	1881	120.1	64	Finals series
5	Geelong	23	15	8	0	2355	1925	122.3	60	Finals series
6	Adelaide	23	15	8	0	2169	1849	117.3	60	Finals series
7	Melbourne	23	15	8	0	2301	2099	109.6	60	Finals series
8	Western Bulldogs	23	13	9	1	1901	1992	95.4	54	Finals series
9	Collingwood	23	12	9	2	2021	1974	102.4	52	Finals series
10	Carlton	23	12	10	1	2007	1978	101.5	50	Finals series
11	St Kilda	23	10	13	0	2030	1974	102.8	40	
12	Greater Western Sydney	23	10	13	0	2073	2095	98.9	40	
13	Gold Coast	23	9	14	0	2011	2128	94.5	36	
14	North Melbourne	23	9	14	0	1932	2175	88.8	36	
**15**	Port Adelaide	**23**	**7**	**16**	**0**	**1804**	**2048**	**88.1**	28	
16	West Coast	23	4	19	0	1615	2333	69.2	16	
17	Richmond	23	3	20	0	1483	2373	62.5	12	
18	Essendon	23	2	21	0	1601	2478	64.6	8	

Source: afl.com.au
Rules for classification: 1) points; 2) percentage; 3) number of points for
(P) Premiers

== AFLW season ==
=== Pre-season ===
**Date and time**	**Opponent**	**Scores** (Port Adelaide's scores indicated in **bold**)			**Venue**	**Ref.**
**Date and time**	**Opponent**	Home	Away	Result	**Venue**	**Ref.**
Friday, 10 July	West Coast	7.3 (45)	**11.6 (72)**	Won by 27 points	Mineral Resources Park (A)	
Saturday, 17 July	Fremantle	**4.6 (30)**	6.9 (45)	Lost by 15 points	Alberton Oval (H)	
Saturday, 25 July (11:30 am)	Melbourne	**6.7 (43)**	7.6 (48)	Lost by 5 points	Alberton Oval (H)	
Sunday, 2 August	Adelaide	**3 goals**	8 goals	Lost	Football Park (A)	

- The fixtures against West Coast, Fremantle and Adelaide were termed "match simulations" and were not played under the same protocols as AFLW home-and-away matches or the official practice match against Melbourne on 25 July.

=== Home-and-away season ===
**Rd**	**Date and time**	**Opponent**	**Scores** (Port Adelaide's scores indicated in **bold**)			**Venue**	**Attendance**	**Ladder**	**Ref.**
**Rd**	**Date and time**	**Opponent**	Home	Away	Result	**Venue**	**Attendance**	**Ladder**	**Ref.**
1	Sunday, 16 August (3:40 pm)	Fremantle	2.8 (20)	**6.5 (41)**	Won by 21 points	Cockburn ARC (A)	2,514	4th	
2	Sunday, 23 August (2:35 pm)	Hawthorn	**5.3 (33)**	10.5 (65)	Lost by 28 points	Alberton Oval (A)	2,706	12th	
3	Sunday, 30 August (12:35 pm)	Greater Western Sydney	8.0 (48)	**7.10 (52)**	Won by 4 points	Corroboree Group Oval (A)	1,902	8th	
4	Saturday, 5 September (2:05 pm)	Gold Coast	**1.8 (14)**	2.5 (17)	Lost by 3 points	Alberton Oval (H)	2,281	12th	
5	Sunday, 13 September (12:35 pm)	Melbourne	11.8 (74)	**2.11 (23)**	Lost by 51 points	Casey Fields (A)	1,762	13th	
6	Saturday, 19 September (2:05 pm)	Sydney	**3.9 (27)**	5.11 (41)	Lost by 14 points	Alberton Oval (H)	3,247	14th	
7	Friday, 25 September (2:05 pm)	Western Bulldogs	10.2 (62)	**8.1 (49)**	Lost by 13 points	Mission Whitten Oval (A)	2,431	14th	
8	Saturday, 3 October (6:45 pm)	Adelaide	**5.6 (36)**	2.10 (22)	Won by 14 points	Alberton Oval (H)	5,441	13th	
9	Saturday, 10 October (2:35 pm)	West Coast	**3.8 (26)**	3.4 (22)	Won by 4 points	Alberton Oval (H)	2,626	12th	
10	Saturday, 17 October (4:05 pm)	Brisbane	5.4 (34)	**2.6 (18)**	Lost by 16 points	Brighton Homes Arena (A)	2,725	11th	
11	Friday, 23 October (6:45 pm)	Collingwood	**8.4 (52)**	0.4 (4)	Won by 48 points	Alberton Oval (H)	3,112	11th	
12	Saturday, 31 October (1:05 pm)	St Kilda	7.3 (45)	**7.9 (51)**	Won by 6 points	RSEA Park (A)	922	9th	

=== Ladder ===
Pos	Team	Pld	W	L	D	PF	PA	PP	Pts	Qualification
1	North Melbourne	12	11	1	0	789	320	246.6	44	Finals series
2	Geelong	12	11	1	0	871	484	180.0	44	Finals series
3	Melbourne	12	10	2	0	715	405	176.5	40	Finals series
4	Carlton	12	9	3	0	554	416	133.2	36	Finals series
5	Gold Coast	12	9	3	0	609	458	133.0	36	Finals series
6	Sydney	12	9	3	0	606	527	115.0	36	Finals series
7	Western Bulldogs	12	8	4	0	495	448	110.5	32	Finals series
8	Hawthorn	12	7	5	0	580	513	113.1	28	Finals series
**9**	Port Adelaide	**12**	**6**	**6**	**0**	**422**	**454**	**93.0**	24	
10	Fremantle	12	5	7	0	477	489	97.5	20	
11	Adelaide	12	5	7	0	528	544	97.1	20	
12	Brisbane	12	4	8	0	504	502	100.4	16	
13	West Coast	12	4	8	0	459	656	70.0	16	
14	Richmond	12	4	8	0	468	714	65.5	16	
15	Greater Western Sydney	12	2	10	0	479	691	69.3	8	
16	Essendon	12	2	10	0	386	646	59.8	8	
17	Collingwood	12	1	11	0	350	646	54.2	4	
18	St Kilda	12	1	11	0	332	711	46.7	4	

Source: afl.com.au
Rules for classification: 1) points; 2) percentage; 3) number of points for

== SANFL season ==
=== Pre-season ===
**Date and time**	**Opponent**	**Scores** (Port Adelaide's scores indicated in **bold**)			**Venue**	**Ref.**
**Date and time**	**Opponent**	Home	Away	Result	**Venue**	**Ref.**
Saturday, 28 February (12:10pm)	Sturt	**8.14 (62)**	6.8 (44)	Won by 18 points	Alberton Oval (H)	
Saturday, 14 March (10:00am)	West Adelaide	11.6 (72)	**11.12 (78)**	Won by 6 points	X Convenience Oval (A)	

=== Home-and-away season ===
**Rd**	**Date and time**	**Opponent**	**Scores** (Port Adelaide's scores indicated in **bold**)			**Venue**	**Attendance**	**Ladder**	**Ref.**
**Rd**	**Date and time**	**Opponent**	Home	Away	Result	**Venue**	**Attendance**	**Ladder**	**Ref.**
1	Saturday, 28 March (4:10 pm)	Glenelg	**8.6 (54)**	15.11 (101)	Lost by 47 points	Alberton Oval (H)	2,040	9th	
2	Friday, 3 April (2:10 pm)	South Adelaide	10.10 (70)	**8.6 (54)**	Lost by 16 points	Magain Stadium (A)	1,742	10th	
3	Sunday, 19 April (2:10 pm)	North Adelaide	**11.8 (74)**	14.7 (91)	Lost by 17 points	Alberton Oval (H)	1,421	10th	
4	Friday, 24 April (7:40 pm)	Norwood	9.14 (68)	**9.7 (61)**	Lost by 7 points	Coopers Stadium (A)	TBC	10th	
5	Friday, 1 May (4:30 pm)	Adelaide	15.8 (98)	**18.10 (118)**	Won by 20 points	Adelaide Oval (A)	N/A (Note: No attendance recorded as the match was a curtain raiser to the AFL match played afterwards.)	9th	
6	Saturday, 9 May (2:10 pm)	Central District	**13.6 (84)**	12.7 (79)	Won by 5 points	Alberton Oval (H)	1,167	8th	
7	Saturday, 23 May (2:10 pm)	Woodville-West Torrens	20.9 (129)	**6.7 (43)**	Lost by 86 points	Woodville Oval (A)	1,425	9th	
8	Bye							9th	
9	Saturday, 6 June (2:10 pm)	Glenelg	17.9 (111)	**9.8 (62)**	Lost by 49 points	Stratarama Stadium (A)	4,125	9th	
10	Sunday, 14 June (2:10 pm)	West Adelaide	**11.11 (77)**	12.14 (86)	Lost by 9 points	Alberton Oval (H)	1,300	9th	
11	Sunday, 21 June (2:10 pm)	Sturt	17.9 (111)	**10.9 (69)**	Lost by 42 points	Thomas Farms Oval (A)	2,722	9th	
12	Saturday, 27 June (3:10 pm)	Adelaide	**12.5 (77)**	19.15 (129)	Lost by 52 points	Adelaide Oval (H)	N/A	10th	
13	Saturday, 4 July (2:10 pm)	South Adelaide	**6.6 (42)**	16.8 (104)	Lost by 62 points	Alberton Oval (H)	1,056	10th	
14	Sunday, 12 July (2:20 pm)	North Adelaide	**13.11 (89)**	4.8 (32)	Lost by 57 points	Revo Fitness Oval (A)	1,909	10th	
15	Saturday, 18 July (7:10 pm)	Woodville-West Torrens	**15.5 (95)**	10.11 (71)	Won by 24 points	Alberton Oval (H)	TBC	10th	
16	Sunday, 2 August (1:10 pm)	Norwood	**3.8 (26)**	14.12 (96)	Lost by 70 points	Alberton Oval (H)	2,249	10th	
17	Sunday, 9 August (2:10 pm)	West Adelaide	19.14 (128)	**3.5 (23)**	Lost by 105 points	Richmond Oval (A)	TBC	10th	
18	Saturday, 15 August (1:10 pm)	Sturt	**11.8 (74)**	17.11 (113)	Lost by 39 points	Alberton Oval (H)	1,229	10th	
19	Saturday, 22 August (2:10 pm)	Central District	19.10 (124)	**9.5 (59)**	Lost by 65 points	X Convenience Oval (A)	1,893	10th	

=== Ladder ===
Pos	Team	Pld	W	L	D	PF	PA	PP	Pts	Qualification
1	Norwood (P)	18	15	3	0	1668	968	63.28	30	Finals series
2	Glenelg	18	15	3	0	1420	1076	56.89	30	Finals series
3	Sturt	18	13	5	0	1631	1200	57.61	26	Finals series
4	Woodville-West Torrens	18	10	8	0	1319	1245	51.44	20	Finals series
5	West Adelaide	18	8	9	1	1263	1276	49.74	17	Finals series
6	South Adelaide	18	8	10	0	1270	1479	46.20	16	
7	Adelaide (R)	18	7	11	0	1458	1541	48.62	14	
8	Central District	18	5	12	1	1213	1354	47.25	11	
9	North Adelaide	18	5	13	0	1101	1530	41.85	10	
**10**	Port Adelaide (R)	**18**	**3**	**15**	**0**	**1124**	**1798**	**38.47**	6	

Source: sanfl.com.au
Rules for classification: 1) points; 2) percentage; 3) number of points for.
(P) Premiers

== Awards ==
=== Power (AFL) ===
- John Cahill Medal – Jason Horne-Francis
- Runner Up – Zak Butters
- Bruce Weber Memorial Award – Mitch Georgiades
- Fos Williams Medal – Willem Drew
- Leading goalkicker – Mitch Georgiades (51 goals)
- Gavin Wanganeen Award – Jack Whitlock
- Coaches’ Award – Josh Lai
- John McCarthy Award – Benny Barrett

=== Power (AFLW) ===
- Best and Fairest Medal – TBC
- Runner-Up Medal – TBC
- Third Place Medal – TBC
- Best First Year Player – TBC
- Coaches Most Improved – TBC
- Players’ Player – TBC
- Leading goalkicker – TBC

=== Magpies (SANFL) ===
- A.R. McLean Medal – Will Lorenz
- Max Porter Memorial Trophy – Will Brodie
- A. Williams Memorial Trophy – Jez McLennan
- Leading goalkicker – Xavier Walsh (23 goals)
- Bob Clayton Award – John Settre
