= List of Port Adelaide Football Club coaches =

The following is a list of the head coaches of the Port Adelaide Football Club, an Australian rules football club who have coached the club in the SAFA, SAFL, Wartime Leagues, SANFL and the AFL (1997–present). Since 1870 Port Adelaide has had 41 head coaches lead the club.

== SAFA/SAFL/SANFL ==
Foundation era
No.	Coach	Coached	Won	Lost	Drew	Win %	Years
1	John Wald	3	0	2	1	00.00	1870
2	Fred Stone						1871
3	George Middleton						1872
4	H. Sparnon						1873
5	John Rann						1874
6	Robert Sandilands						1875
7	William Fletcher						1876
South Australian Football Association era
No.	Coach	Coached	Won	Lost	Drew	Win %	Years
	William Fletcher	35	19	8	8	54.29	1877-1879
8	J.A. Atkins	11	3	3	5	27.27	1880
9	J.H. Sandilands	13	2	6	5	15.38	1881
10	Charles Kellett	14	7	7	0	50.00	1882
11	Richard Turpenny	44	24	15	5	54.55	1883-1885
12	Jack McGargill	366	236	116	14	64.48	1886-1908
South Australian Football League era
No.	Coach	Coached	Won	Lost	Drew	Win %	Years
	Jack McGargill	See Above					1886-1908
13	Archibald Hosie (1)	30	23	7	0	76.67	1909-1910
14	Mick Donaghy						1911
15	Jack Woollard						1911
16	Sampson Hosking (1)	14	12	2	0	85.71	1912
17	Jack Londrigan	28	26	2	0	92.86	1913-1914
18	Alexander McFarlane	14	9	4	1	64.29	1915
Play suspended due to WWI
19	Frank Hansen	26	14	11	1	53.85	1919-1920
	Sampson Hosking (2)	17	13	4	0	76.47	1921
20	Samuel Howie	14	7	7	0	50.00	1922
21	Clement Dayman	14	5	9	0	35.71	1923
	Archibald Hosie (2)	30	19	11	0	63.33	1924-1925
22	Maurice Allingham	15	10	5	0	66.67	1926
South Australian National Football League era
No.	Coach	Coached	Won	Lost	Drew	Win %	Years
	Sampson Hosking (3)	96	66	29	1	68.75	1927-1931
23	Sydney Ween	18	10	8	0	55.56	1932
24	Len Ashby	38	24	13	1	63.16	1934-1935
	Sampson Hosking (4)	59	43	16	0	72.88	1936-1938
25	Robert Quinn (1)						1939-1940
26	Allan Reval						1940-1941
WWII Patriotic League (merger with West Torrens)
No.	Coach	Coached	Won	Lost	Drew	Win %	Years
	Sampson Hosking (5)						1942-1944
Competition returns to un-aligned teams
No.	Coach	Coached	Won	Lost	Drew	Win %	Years
	Robert Quinn (2)	58	43	15	0	74.14	1945-1947
27	Lew Roberts	17	4	13	0	23.53	1948
28	Jack McCarthy	17	7	10	0	41.18	1949
29	Fos Williams (1)	180	145	34	1	80.56	1950-1958
30	Geof Motley	62	48	14	0	77.42	1959-1961
	Fos Williams (2)	267	188	78	1	70.41	1962-1973
31	John Cahill (1)	216	158	54	4	73.15	1974-1982
32	Russell Ebert	116	64	52	0	55.17	1983-1987
	John Cahill (2)	205	153	52	0	74.63	1988-1996
33	Stephen Williams (caretaker)	12	8	4	0	66.67	1996

== AFL ==
AFL era
No.	Coach	Coached	Won	Lost	Drew	Win %	Years
	John Cahill (3)	44	19	23	2	45.45	1997–1998
34	Mark Williams	273	150	121	2	55.31	1999–2010
35	Phil Walsh (caretaker)	1	1	0	0	100	2001
36	Matthew Primus	47	13	34	0	27.66	2010–2012
37	Garry Hocking (caretaker)	4	0	3	1	00.00	2012
38	Ken Hinkley	297	174	123	0	58.59	2013–2025
39	Alan Richardson (caretaker)	1	0	1	0	00.00	2013
40	Nathan Bassett (caretaker)	1	0	1	0	00.00	2022
41	Josh Carr	4	2	2	0	50.00	2026–Current

== AFL Women's ==
Season(s)	Coach	Notes
2022 (S7)–	Lauren Arnell	
