= Dan Houston =

Australian rules footballer

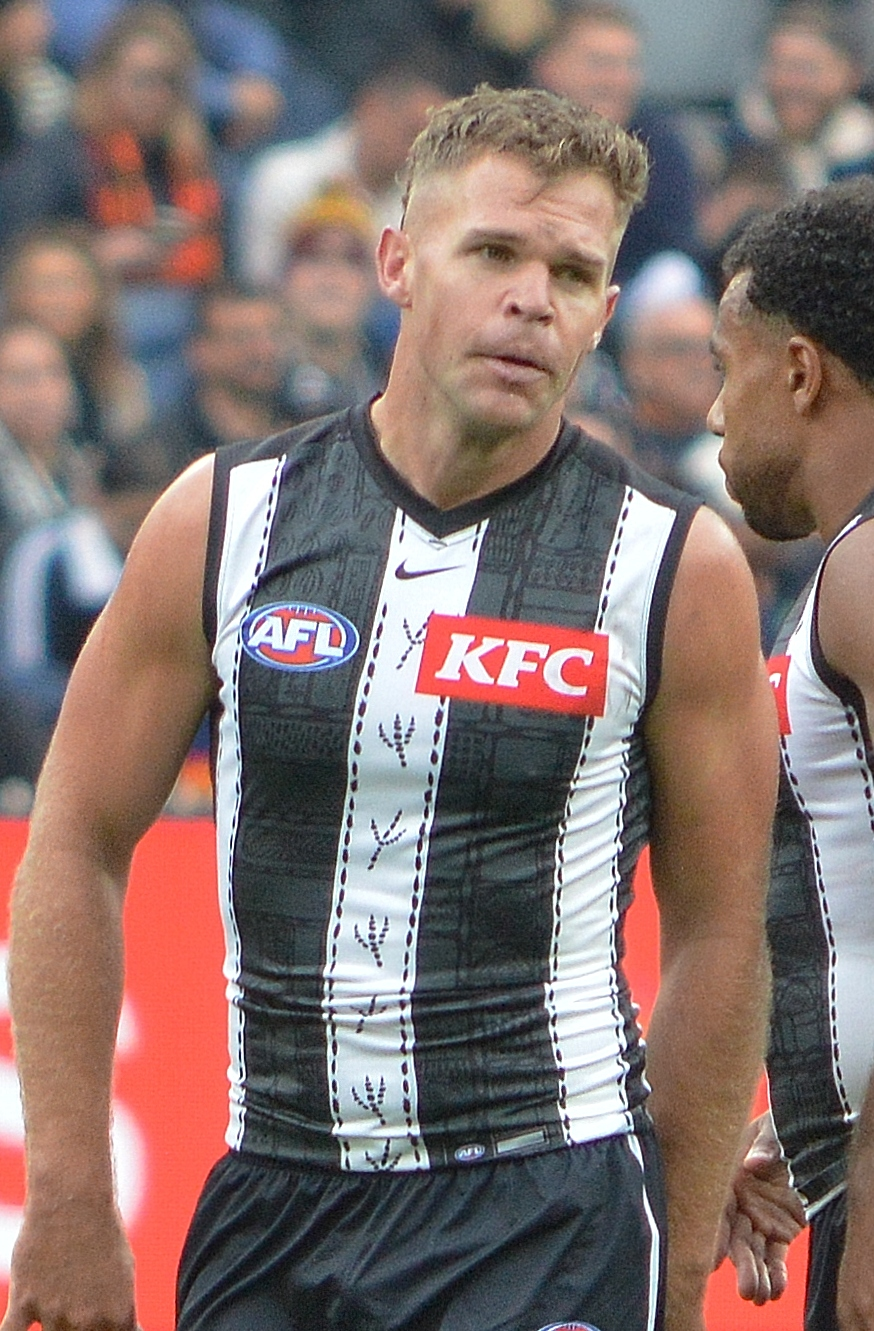
- Houston with Collingwood in 2025

Personal information
- Full name: Daniel Houston
- Nickname: Hootin
- Born: 12 May 1997 (age 29)
- Original team: Oakleigh Chargers (TAC Cup)
- Draft: No. 45, 2016 rookie draft
- Debut: Round 1, 2017, Port Adelaide vs. Sydney, at Sydney Cricket Ground
- Height: 186 cm (6 ft 1 in)
- Weight: 83 kg (183 lb)
- Position: Defender

Club information
- Current club: Collingwood
- Number: 9

Playing career^{1}
Years	Club	Games (Goals)
2016–2024	Port Adelaide	168 (41)
2025–	Collingwood	45 (13)
Total		213 (54)
- ^{1} Playing statistics correct to the end of the 2026 season.

Career highlights
- 2x All-Australian team: 2023, 2024; Gavin Wanganeen Medal: 2018; AFL Rising Star nominee: 2017

Daniel Houston (born 12 May 1997) is an Australian rules footballer who plays for the Collingwood Football Club in the Australian Football League (AFL). A two-time All-Australian, Houston previously played for Port Adelaide.

== AFL career ==
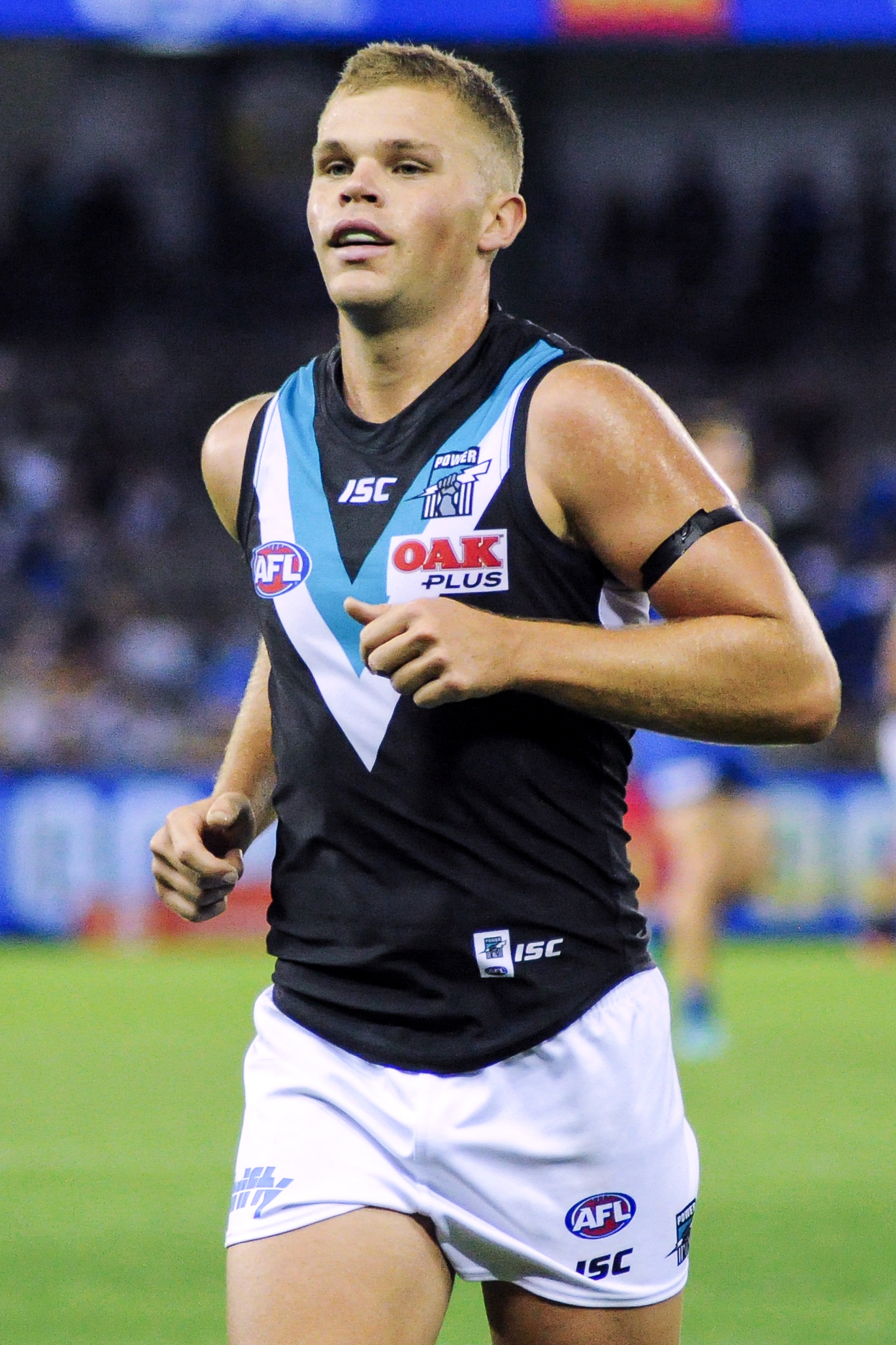
Houston playing for Port Adelaide in 2018

=== Port Adelaide ===
He was drafted by the Port Adelaide Football Club with their third selection and 45th overall in the 2016 rookie draft. Prior to the start of the 2017 season, he was promoted to the senior list and subsequently made his debut in his team's 28-point win against Sydney in the opening round of the season at the Sydney Cricket Ground.

Houston received the AFL Rising Star nomination for round 21 after gathering 21 disposals and kicking his first AFL goal in the 27-point win over Collingwood at the Adelaide Oval.

In 2020, Houston was handed a two match suspension for breaching the AFL's COVID-19 protocols, after he and teammate Peter Ladhams had invited unauthorised visitors into their home.

In round 16, 2023, Houston had a best-on-ground possession count of 32 as well as kicking a 55- to 60-metre goal after the siren to defeat Essendon by 4 points, the 57th player to kick a winning goal after the siren in 127 years of VFL/AFL history. Houston's form was rewarded with his first selection into the All-Australian team in 2023. He also finished third in the John Cahill Medal count that year, behind fellow All-Australians Connor Rozee and Zak Butters.

During the third quarter of the 56th Showdown against cross-town rivals Adelaide, Houston engaged in rough conduct with Izak Rankine. Rankine was immediately concussed, having to be stretchered off the ground. Houston was sent immediately to the AFL's tribunal, and banned for five matches after an unsuccessful appeal, meaning he missed the rest of the season.

=== Collingwood ===
In October 2024, despite previously stating in August he would remain at Port Adelaide, Houston requested a trade to a Victorian club. He was eventually traded to Collingwood as part of a "mega trade" involving three clubs and five players. He signed a six-year deal for the Magpies.

After missing the opening round match against Greater Western Sydney, Houston went on to make his Collingwood debut the following week against his former club in Port Adelaide. After only three games for his new team, Houston engaged in rough conduct with Carlton's Lachie Fogarty. He was subsequently suspended for a further two matches.

== Statistics ==
Updated to the end of round 22, 2026.

Legend
G	Goals	K	Kicks	D	Disposals	T	Tackles
B	Behinds	H	Handballs	M	Marks

Season	Team	No.	Games	Totals							Averages (per game)							Votes
Season	Team	No.	Games	G	B	K	H	D	M	T	G	B	K	H	D	M	T	Votes
2016	Port Adelaide	43	0	—	—	—	—	—	—	—	—	—	—	—	—	—	—	0
2017	Port Adelaide	43	17	2	3	175	101	276	101	52	0.1	0.2	10.3	5.9	16.2	5.9	3.1	0
2018	Port Adelaide	43	22	2	0	262	108	370	117	59	0.1	0.0	11.9	4.9	16.8	5.3	2.7	0
2019	Port Adelaide	43	21	6	5	271	179	450	90	65	0.3	0.2	12.9	8.5	21.4	4.3	3.1	3
2020 (Note: The 2020 season was played with 17 home-and-away matches per team (down from 22) and 16-minute quarters with time on (down from 20-minute quarters with time on) due to the impact of the COVID-19 pandemic.)	Port Adelaide	5	17	1	3	211	83	294	71	50	0.1	0.2	12.4	4.9	17.3	4.2	2.9	0
2021	Port Adelaide	5	23	7	6	313	168	481	110	56	0.3	0.3	13.6	7.3	20.9	4.8	2.4	5
2022	Port Adelaide	5	21	7	7	349	136	485	131	55	0.3	0.3	16.6	6.5	23.1	6.2	2.6	3
2023	Port Adelaide	5	25	9	5	389	195	584	143	85	0.4	0.2	15.6	7.8	23.4	5.7	3.4	7
2024	Port Adelaide	5	22	7	4	368	139	507	118	77	0.3	0.2	16.7	6.3	23.0	5.4	3.5	4
2025	Collingwood	9	21	7	4	230	124	354	75	49	0.3	0.2	11.0	5.9	16.9	3.6	2.3	3
2026	Collingwood	9	21	4	11	287	166	453	138	51	0.2	0.5	13.7	7.9	21.6	6.6	2.4	0
Career			210	52	48	2855	1399	4254	1094	599	0.2	0.2	13.6	6.7	20.3	5.2	2.9	25
