= 2018 SANFL Grand Final =

Norwood	North Adelaide
15.15 (105)	19.10 (124)
	1	2	3	4
NOR	3.7 (25)	7.11 (53)	12.14 (86)	15.15 (105)
NTH	5.0 (30)	9.4 (58)	14.7 (91)	19.10 (124)
- Date: 23 September 2018, 3.00 pm
- Stadium: Adelaide Oval
- Attendance: 40,355
- Umpires: Corey Bowen, Toby Medlin, Mitchell Harris
- Coin toss won by: North Adelaide
- Kicked toward: Southern (Riverbank Stand End)

Ceremonies
- Pre-match entertainment: Dragon

Accolades
- Jack Oatey Medallist: Mitch Grigg (Norwood)

Broadcast in Australia
- Network: Seven Network
- Commentators: Mark Soderstrom, John Casey, Rhett Biglands, Andrew Hayes, Tim Ginever

The 2018 South Australian National Football League (SANFL) grand final was played at the Adelaide Oval on Sunday, 23 September to determine the premiers for the 2018 SANFL season.

The Grand Final was contested by Norwood and North Adelaide.

North Adelaide won the grand final, defeating Norwood by 19 points, winning their first premiership since 1991. The Jack Oatey Medal for the best player on the ground was won by Norwood's Mitch Grigg - the first member of a losing grand final side to win the medal.

This marked the highest scoring grand final since 1983, with both teams kicking over one hundred points.

== Background ==
Norwood were minor premiers, and progressed directly to the Grand Final by defeating Woodville-West Torrens in the Second Semi-final.

North Adelaide finished the minor round in fifth place, although only one and a half wins behind second place. They progressed to the Grand Final by successively defeating South Adelaide, Sturt and Woodville-West Torrens. A major incident in this latter match, the Preliminary Final, caused lingering uncertainty about the result. North Adelaide commenced the final quarter with 19 players on the field (one more than permitted under Law 5.1), before correcting their error after "about five minutes." In reality it was 3 minutes 39 seconds. Woodville-West Torrens, being unaware of the situation, missed their only opportunity for redress: request that an umpire count the players and annul North Adelaide's match score of 56 points to that stage. During those 3 minutes 39 seconds, North Adelaide advanced its score by 2 points. 10 seconds later North scored a goal at the 3 minute 49 second mark, giving rise to the argument that North scored 8 points whilst the 19th man was on, which was greater than the final margin of 5 points (although North had led by as much 22 points). Michael David QC, sitting as the SANFL tribunal, later analysed events fully, and confirmed that there was no legal basis on which to disqualify North Adelaide, so the match result stood. On a charge of being "grossly negligent" he penalised North Adelaide $10,000 and 4 premiership points for the following season. This saga seems to have prompted two changes in the 2019 Laws of Australian rules football: 1. Law 5.5.3 "Players Exceeding Permitted Number"(c) was amended to remove only the points scored in that quarter until the count, and 2. Law 5.5.5 "Post-Match Review" was inserted to enable "reversal of Match result." Technically the second of these provisions may have caused a loss for North in the 2018 Preliminary Final. Incidentally in the 1982 Second Semi Final, Norwood had 19 men on the ground for some time after 3/4 time and Port Adelaide were aware of the transgression, but Port coach, John Cahill stated that he would hate to win a match that way.

== Teams ==
2018 Premiership Team
B:	Mitch Clisby (10)	Cameron Craig (5)	Callum Wilkie (26)
HB:	Brock Castree (23)	Tanner Smith (7)	Connor Rozee (48)
C:	Jarred Allmond (11)	Aidan Tropiano (1)	Maris Olekalns (14)
HF:	Lewis Hender (19)	Keenan Ramsey (3)	Boyd Woodcock (27)
F:	Mitch Harvey (17)	Alex Barns (4)	Robbie Young (8)
Foll:	Jordon Sweet (40)	Tom Schwarz (15)	Max Thring (c) (30)
Int:	Sam McInerney (39)	Mackenzie Slee (53)	Jake Wohling (20)
Coach:	Josh Carr		

Scorers: Barns 4.0, Harvey 3.2, McInerney 3.0, Woodcock 3.0, Hender 2.2, Ramsey 1.1, Sweet 1.1, Wilkie 1.0, Young 1.0, Olekalns 0.1, Thring 0.1, Tropiano 0.1, rushed 0.1
