= Callum Wilkie =

Australian rules footballer (born 1996)

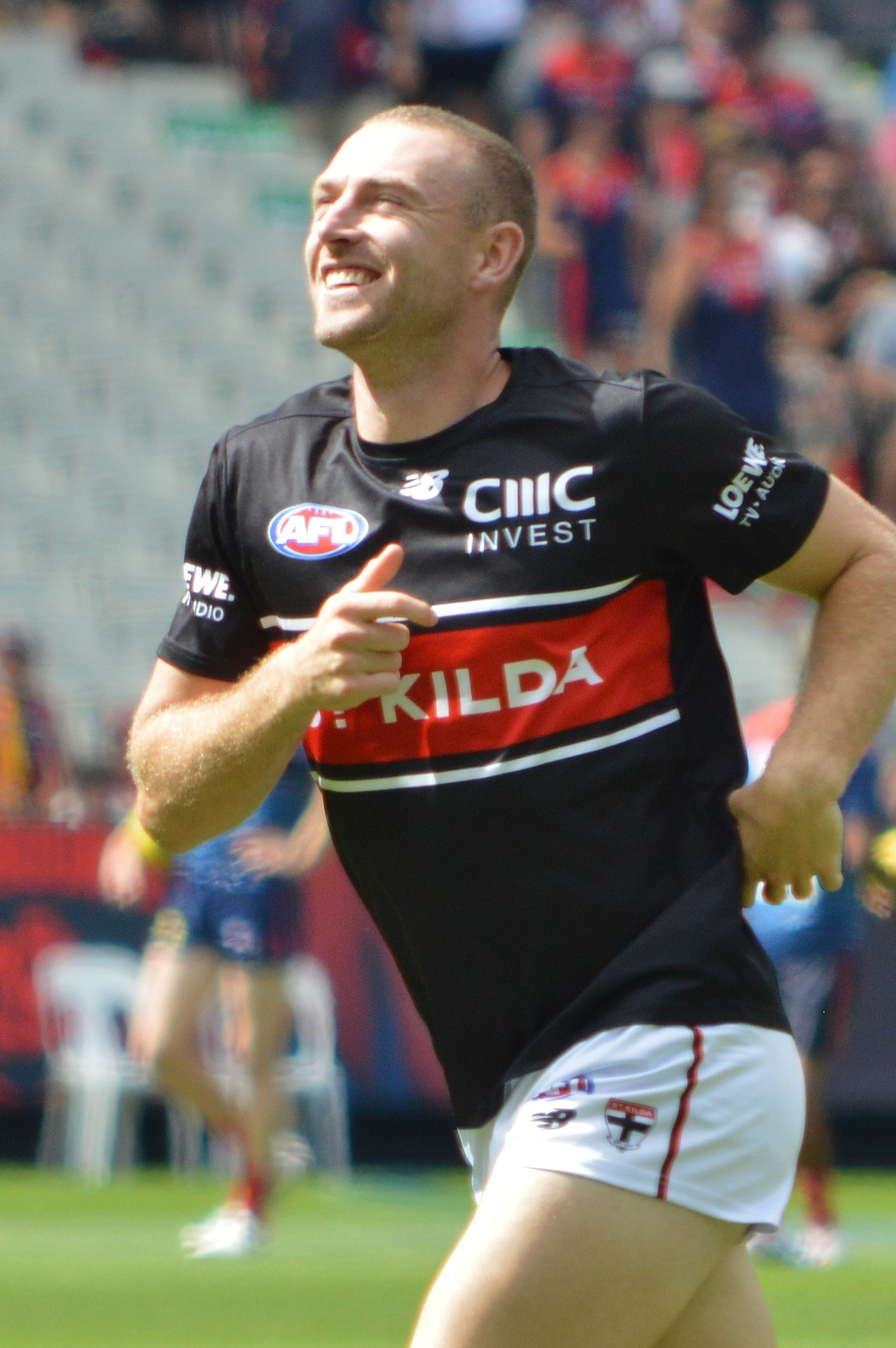
- Wilkie with St Kilda in March 2026

Personal information
- Full name: Callum Sebastian Nelmes Wilkie
- Born: 10 March 1996 (age 30)
- Original team: North Adelaide (SANFL)
- Draft: No. 3, 2019 rookie draft
- Debut: Round 1, 2019, St Kilda vs. Gold Coast, at Marvel Stadium
- Height: 191 cm (6 ft 3 in)
- Weight: 87 kg (192 lb)
- Position: Key defender

Club information
- Current club: St Kilda
- Number: 44

Playing career^{1}
Years	Club	Games (Goals)
2019–	St Kilda	176 (1)
- ^{1} Playing statistics correct to the end of round 22, 2026.

Career highlights
- St Kilda co-captain: 2026–; 2x All-Australian team: 2023, 2026; 2x Trevor Barker Award: 2024, 2026; Ian Stewart Medal: 2025; AFLCA Defensive Player of the Year: 2026; SANFL Premiership player (2018)

Callum Sebastian Nelmes Wilkie (born 10 March 1996) is an Australian rules footballer playing for and co-captain of St Kilda in the Australian Football League (AFL). A defender, he played in the South Australian National Football League (SANFL) and was overlooked at four national drafts before St Kilda selected him with pick 3 in the 2019 rookie draft. Wilkie debuted in the opening round of the 2019 season and is yet to miss an AFL match for St Kilda since his debut, playing 155 consecutive matches for the Saints (to the end of the 2025 season).

== Early career ==
Wilkie played junior football for Walkerville before joining North Adelaide when he was 13. He also played for his school Rostrevor College. He represented South Australia at the 2014 AFL Under 18 Championships and attended the state draft combine, but missed out on selection in the draft. He would ultimately be overlooked in the draft four times.

Continuing at North Adelaide, Wilkie came second in their 2017 senior best and fairest. In 2018, he played in North Adelaide's SANFL premiership – their first for 27 years. Wilkie won the club's best and fairest, and attended his second state draft combine.

AFL.com.au named him among the best mature-age players ahead of the 2018 AFL draft, noting his marking ability and improved fitness.

Wilkie admitted that he “wasn’t 100% focused on footy”, as he balanced his full-time accountancy career while also playing SANFL up until he was drafted by the Saints. Of his time before St Kilda, football for Wilkie was “enjoying footy for what it was - a little bit of an escape from work and then enjoying playing with my mates." Six clubs expressed an interested in drafting Wilkie at the end of 2018.

== AFL career ==
=== Drafting and First Season (2019) ===
Wilkie was selected by St Kilda with pick 3 in the 2018 rookie draft. Of his drafting, Wilkie spoke of how he quit his full-time accountacy job on Friday afternoon and was in Melbourne by Sunday:

“Everyone was packing up when the Rookie Draft started because it was about five o’clock on a Friday and I was packing up as well. Then Chris Toce messaged me asking if I was watching this. I was planning on going home and then watching it there but it started early. I flicked on the live tracker and the Saints were the next pick, so I thought that it was weird he was texting me. Then I refreshed it and it was up to Pick 8 and I had been taken and he called me straight away. As soon as I got that call I left the room so I wouldn’t have to take that call in front of people. It was an unbelievable call. When I came back through they were all waiting for me. It was a pretty amazing time. I cleaned out my desk on the Saturday and then came here on the Sunday. It all happened pretty fast.”

James Gallagher, St Kilda's list manager, cited the club's need for a back-up defender if Dylan Roberton's heart problems, which had cut short his 2018 season, continued. Roberton's heart issue reoccurred in the 2019 JLT Community Series, ruling him out for another year, and allowing Wilkie to take on Roberton's defensive role. After debuting in the opening round of the 2019 season and showing strong form in the next three matches, Wilkie signed a contract extension with St Kilda to the end of 2021. Wilkie's showed great promise and immediate AFL competency playing on some of the game's stars in the early part of 2019, including Jake Stringer, Jesse Hogan, Cam McCarthy, Jarryd Roughead and Jack Gunston. Wilkie capped off an impressive debut season, finishing seventh in the Trevor Barker Award with 115 votes.

=== 2020 ===
Wilkie played all 19 possible games in 2020, including two finals and made another top 10 for the Trevor Barker Award, finishing seventh for a second consecutive year with 113 votes. Wilkie averaged 13 disposals, eight effective kicks, four rebound-50s, three spoils a game in 2020. He finished the season first for St Kilda's rebound-50s and effective kicks, second for one-percenters and spoils, third for intercept marks. His best game for the year came in Round 10 against Gold Coast where he gathered 18 disposals, six marks (three contested), four rebound-50s and four one-percenters. Wilkie's rebounding numbers were also elite for the AFL.

=== 2021 ===
Wilkie extended his contract by a further two years at the beginning of the 2021 season. Wilkie was also voted into the Saints' leadership group for the 2021 season, for the first time. Wilkie continued to earn his reputation as one of the game's best defenders; in his first 18 games of 2021, Wilkie had not been outmarked in 43 one-on-one contests. In May, Wilkie was ranked second in the AFL's as a defender in a direct contest, with a contest win percentage of 59.1%, behind only Ryan Lester with 61.9% Wilkie had a dominant defensive game in Round 21; playing on Sydney syperstar Lance Franklin, Wilkie kept Franklin to just one goal from four kicks and zero marks. Wilkie also had 16 disposals of his own, setting up a number of attacking plays. Wilkie finished fourth in the Trevor Barker Award, his third consecutive top-10 finish.

== Statistics ==
Updated to the end of round 22, 2026.

Legend
G	Goals	K	Kicks	D	Disposals	T	Tackles
B	Behinds	H	Handballs	M	Marks

Season	Team	No.	Games	Totals							Averages (per game)							Votes
Season	Team	No.	Games	G	B	K	H	D	M	T	G	B	K	H	D	M	T	Votes
2019	St Kilda	44	22	0	0	221	103	324	113	42	0.0	0.0	10.0	4.7	14.7	5.1	1.9	0
2020 (Note: The 2020 season was played with 17 home-and-away matches per team (down from 22) and 16-minute quarters with time on (down from 20-minute quarters with time on) due to the impact of the COVID-19 pandemic.)	St Kilda	44	19	0	0	178	62	240	61	22	0.0	0.0	9.4	3.3	12.6	3.2	1.2	0
2021	St Kilda	44	22	0	1	248	85	333	126	39	0.0	0.0	11.3	3.9	15.1	5.7	1.8	0
2022	St Kilda	44	22	1	0	240	120	360	163	30	0.0	0.0	10.9	5.5	16.4	7.4	1.4	0
2023	St Kilda	44	24	0	1	329	145	474	207	50	0.0	0.0	13.7	6.0	19.8	8.6	2.1	2
2024	St Kilda	44	23	0	0	270	132	402	178	31	0.0	0.0	11.7	5.7	17.5	7.7	1.3	3
2025	St Kilda	44	23	0	0	321	108	429	194	34	0.0	0.0	14.0	4.7	18.7	8.4^{†}	1.5	3
2026	St Kilda	44	21	0	1	320	152	472	202	34	0.0	0.0	15.2	7.2	22.5	9.6	1.6	0
Career			176	1	3	2127	907	3034	1244	282	0.0	0.0	12.1	5.2	17.2	7.1	1.6	8
