= Will Brodie =

Australian rules footballer

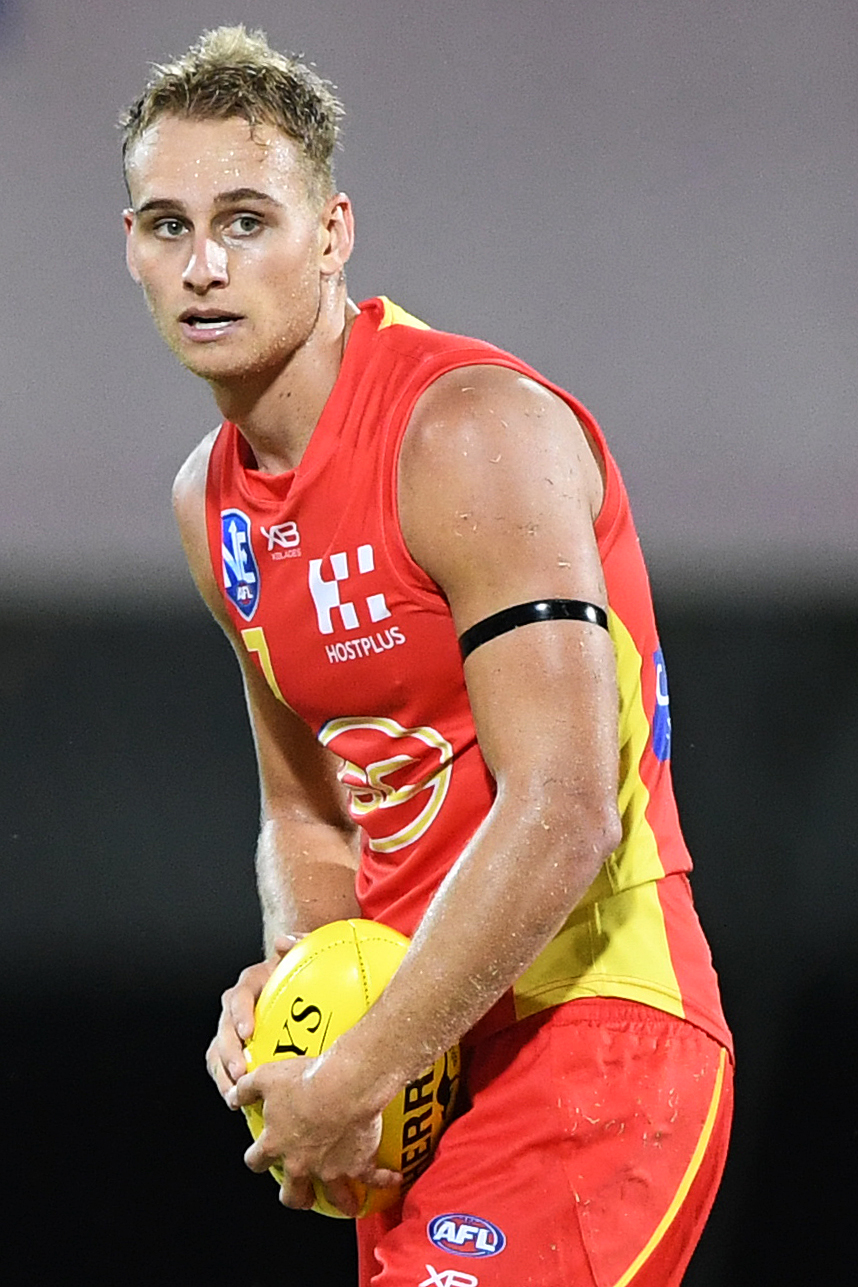
- Brodie playing for Gold Coast in 2019

Personal information
- Full name: Will Brodie
- Nickname: Wiz
- Born: 23 August 1998 (age 28)
- Original team: Murray Bushrangers (TAC Cup)/Shepparton Football Club
- Draft: No. 9, 2016 national draft
- Debut: Round 10, 2017, Gold Coast vs. Melbourne, at TIO Traeger Park
- Height: 190 cm (6 ft 3 in)
- Weight: 88 kg (194 lb)
- Position: Midfielder

Playing career^{1}
Years	Club	Games (Goals)
2017–2021	Gold Coast	25 (3)
2022–2025	Fremantle	29 (7)
2026	Port Adelaide	2 (0)
Total		56 (10)
- ^{1} Playing statistics correct to the end of 2026.

Career highlights
- WAFL premiership player: 2024

Will Brodie (born 23 August 1998) is a former professional Australian rules footballer playing for the Port Adelaide Football Club in the Australian Football League (AFL). Brodie previously played for the Gold Coast Suns and Fremantle.

== Early career ==
He grew up in Shepparton before accepting a scholarship to attend Scotch College in Melbourne. He was drafted by Gold Coast with their third selection and ninth overall in the 2016 national draft.

== AFL career ==
=== Gold Coast: (2017–2021) ===
He made his debut in the thirty-five point loss against Melbourne at TIO Traeger Park in round ten of the 2017 season.

Brodie started to find some consistency with his football early in the 2019 AFL season, however, a hamstring injury caused him to miss the remainder of the year. Brodie played the first round of the 2020 AFL season, but the COVID-19 related shutdown of the competition saw him out of the side and unable to break back in that season.

Brodie played five games for Gold Coast in 2021. Following the 2021 AFL season, Brodie was traded to Fremantle.

=== Fremantle: (2022–2025) ===
Brodie made his debut for Fremantle during their one-point win over Adelaide at Adelaide Oval in Round 1 of the 2022 AFL season. Brodie played every game in 2022, a career-best, and was an important part of Fremantle's midfield that season. He finished eleventh in the league for total disposals with 607, and ninth for clearances.

Brodie only played five AFL games for Fremantle in 2023, being omitted after Round 2. In his first WAFL game, he racked up 37 disposals for Peel Thunder in their 4-point win over East Fremantle. Brodie returned to Fremantle's line-up in Round 5 against Gold Coast, starting as the substitute and replacing Sam Switkowski in the second quarter. He was omitted for Round 8, and played no more AFL games in 2023.

Despite being named in Fremantle's extended squad several times throughout the 2024 and 2025 AFL seasons, Brodie failed to make a senior appearance and spent the entirety of the two years playing for Peel Thunder, including in their 2024 Premiership win.

At the end of the 2025 AFL season, Brodie requested a trade to Port Adelaide to reunite with Josh Carr, who was Fremantle's midfield coach in 2022, Brodie's best season. He was traded to the Power for pick 103, a sixth-round draft pick.

=== Port Adelaide: (2026–present) ===
After going unselected in rounds 1 & 2, Brodie played his first game for Port in Round 3 of the 2026 AFL season against West Coast at Adelaide Oval.

Brodie retired at the conclusion of the 2026 AFL season.

== Statistics ==
Updated to the end of the 2026 season.

Legend
G	Goals	K	Kicks	D	Disposals	T	Tackles
B	Behinds	H	Handballs	M	Marks

Season	Team	No.	Games	Totals							Averages (per game)							Votes
Season	Team	No.	Games	G	B	K	H	D	M	T	G	B	K	H	D	M	T	Votes
2017	Gold Coast	41	3	0	1	20	21	41	7	18	0.0	0.3	6.7	7.0	13.7	2.3	6.0	0
2018	Gold Coast	41	8	1	1	62	89	151	18	34	0.1	0.1	7.8	11.1	18.9	2.3	4.3	0
2019	Gold Coast	7	8	2	1	77	97	174	34	44	0.3	0.1	9.6	12.1	21.8	4.3	5.5	0
2020 (Note: The 2020 season was played with 17 home-and-away matches per team (down from 22) and 16-minute quarters with time on (down from 20-minute quarters with time on) due to the impact of the COVID-19 pandemic.)	Gold Coast	7	1	0	0	4	10	14	3	1	0.0	0.0	4.0	10.0	14.0	3.0	1.0	0
2021	Gold Coast	7	5	0	1	25	39	64	7	8	0.0	0.2	5.0	7.8	12.8	1.4	1.6	0
2022	Fremantle	17	24	6	7	273	370	643	63	127	0.3	0.3	11.4	15.4	26.8	2.6	5.3	11
2023	Fremantle	17	5	1	1	37	66	103	5	19	0.2	0.2	7.4	13.2	20.6	1.0	3.8	0
2024	Fremantle	17	0	—	—	—	—	—	—	—	—	—	—	—	—	—	—	0
2025	Fremantle	17	0	—	—	—	—	—	—	—	—	—	—	—	—	—	—	0
2026	Port Adelaide	23	2	0	0	12	28	40	3	5	0.0	0.0	6.0	14.0	20.0	1.5	2.5	0
Career			56	10	12	510	720	1230	140	256	0.2	0.2	9.1	12.9	22.0	2.5	4.6	11

=== WAFL statistics ===
Statistics are correct to the end of 2025.

Legend
G	Goals	K	Kicks	D	Disposals	T	Tackles
B	Behinds	H	Handballs	M	Marks

Season	Team	No.	Games	Totals							Averages (per game)						
Season	Team	No.	Games	G	B	K	H	D	M	T	G	B	K	H	D	M	T
2023	Peel Thunder	17	13	1	4	130	227	357	30	70	0.1	0.3	10.0	17.5	27.5	2.3	5.4
2024	Peel Thunder	19	19	5	6	181	342	523	54	65	0.3	0.3	9.5	18.0	27.5	2.8	3.4
2025	Peel Thunder	17	13	5	2	112	218	330	24	58	0.3	0.0	8.7	18.1	25.4	2.3	4.4
Career			45	11	12	423	787	1210	108	193	0.2	0.3	9.5	17.8	26.9	2.6	4.3
