= 2023 All-Australian team =

Honorary Australian rules football team

The 2023 All-Australian team represents the best performed Australian Football League (AFL) players during the 2023 season. It was announced on 30 August as a complete Australian rules football team of 22 players. The team is honorary and does not play any games.

== Selection panel ==
The selection panel for the 2023 All-Australian team consisted of chairman Gillon McLachlan, Eddie Betts, Jude Bolton, Nathan Buckley, Kane Cornes, Andrew Dillon, Glen Jakovich, Laura Kane, Cameron Ling, and Matthew Pavlich.

== Team ==
=== Initial squad ===
The initial 44-man All-Australian squad was announced on 28 August, with all eighteen clubs supplying at least one nominee.

Club	Total	Player(s)
Adelaide	2	Jordan Dawson, Taylor Walker
Brisbane Lions	4	Harris Andrews, Charlie Cameron, Joe Daniher, Lachie Neale
Carlton	3	Patrick Cripps, Charlie Curnow, Jacob Weitering
Collingwood	5	Josh Daicos, Nick Daicos, Jordan De Goey, Darcy Moore, Isaac Quaynor
Essendon	3	Kyle Langford, Zach Merrett, Mason Redman
Fremantle	3	Luke Jackson, Luke Ryan, Caleb Serong
Geelong	1	Tom Stewart
Gold Coast	1	Noah Anderson
Greater Western Sydney	3	Stephen Coniglio, Tom Green, Toby Greene
Hawthorn	3	Luke Breust, Jai Newcombe, James Sicily
Melbourne	2	Christian Petracca, Jack Viney
North Melbourne	1	Nick Larkey
Port Adelaide	3	Zak Butters, Dan Houston, Connor Rozee
Richmond	1	Dustin Martin
St Kilda	3	Rowan Marshall, Jack Sinclair, Callum Wilkie
Sydney	2	Nick Blakey, Errol Gulden
West Coast	1	Oscar Allen
Western Bulldogs	3	Marcus Bontempelli, Tim English, Tom Liberatore

=== Final team ===
The final team was announced on Wednesday, 30 August.

2023 All-Australian team
B:	James Sicily (Hawthorn)	Callum Wilkie (St Kilda)	Tom Stewart (Geelong)
HB:	Jack Sinclair (St Kilda)	Darcy Moore (Collingwood)	Dan Houston (Port Adelaide)
C:	Errol Gulden (Sydney)	Marcus Bontempelli (Western Bulldogs) (vice-captain)	Josh Daicos (Collingwood)
HF:	Connor Rozee (Port Adelaide)	Taylor Walker (Adelaide)	Christian Petracca (Melbourne)
F:	Charlie Cameron (Brisbane Lions)	Charlie Curnow (Carlton)	Toby Greene (Greater Western Sydney) (captain)
Foll:	Tim English (Western Bulldogs)	Zak Butters (Port Adelaide)	Nick Daicos (Collingwood)
Int:	Jordan Dawson (Adelaide)	Nick Larkey (North Melbourne)	Zach Merrett (Essendon)
Int:	Caleb Serong (Fremantle)		
Coach:	Craig McRae (Collingwood)		

Note: the position of coach in the All-Australian team is traditionally awarded to the coach of the premiership team.
