= John Wald =

Playing career
Years	Club	Games (Goals)
1870	Port Adelaide	3 (2)

Career highlights
- Port Adelaide inaugural captain (1870); Port Adelaide inaugural coach (1870); Port Adelaide leading goalkicker (1870)

John Wald Jr. (1851 - 17 April 1871) was an Australian rules footballer who was the inaugural captain and coach of the Port Adelaide Football Club.

== Early life ==
Born in Stromness, Scotland, John was brought to Australia by his parents in 1852. His father, John Firth Wald, ran a jewellery and watchmaking business in Adelaide.

== Port Adelaide Football Club ==
Wald captained and coached the Port Adelaide Football Club during its first ever game, which took place in 1870 at Buck's Flat, part of John Hart's Glanville Estate. That inaugural inter-club game was against a team known as the 'Young Australians,' and finished in a draw.

Wald played his final match on 1 October 1870, playing for a Port Adelaide "Blue" side against a "White", Wald kicked the only goal of the game and was considered one of the best players in the match.

Wald died in Norwood on 17 April 1871, aged 19.
