= Mitch Clisby =

Australian rules footballer

Personal information
- Full name: Mitchell Andrew Clisby
- Born: 5 January 1990 (age 36)
- Original teams: West Broken Hill, North Adelaide
- Draft: No. 19, 2013 Rookie draft
- Height: 182 cm (6 ft 0 in)
- Weight: 75 kg (165 lb)
- Position: Defender

Playing career^{1}
Years	Club	Games (Goals)
2013–2014	Melbourne	8 (1)
- ^{1} Playing statistics correct to the end of 2014.

Career highlights
- SANFL Premiership Player (2018)

Mitchell Andrew Clisby (born 5 January 1990) is an Australian rules footballer who played with the Melbourne Football Club in the Australian Football League (AFL). He was recruited by the club from North Adelaide in the 2013 Rookie draft, with pick number 19. Clisby made his debut in round 13, 2013, against St Kilda at the Melbourne Cricket Ground. He played eight games for Melbourne in his debut season, but in 2014 was not selected for a single senior match and was subsequently delisted at season's end.

In February 2015, Clisby was given a short-term contract by Essendon to play in the 2015 NAB Challenge as a "top-up" player, due to 26 Essendon players withdrawing from the NAB Challenge because of the ongoing Essendon Football Club supplements controversy.

Following the end of his contract at Essendon, Clisby returned to North Adelaide, captaining the side in 2016-17 and playing in North's 2018 premiership team.

Clisby's uncle Trevor Clisby also played for North Adelaide.

== Statistics ==
Legend
G	Goals	K	Kicks	D	Disposals	T	Tackles
B	Behinds	H	Handballs	M	Marks

Season	Team	No.	Games	Totals							Averages (per game)						
Season	Team	No.	Games	G	B	K	H	D	M	T	G	B	K	H	D	M	T
2013	Melbourne	50	8	1	3	86	64	150	34	18	0.1	0.4	10.8	8.0	18.8	4.3	2.3
2014	Melbourne	15	0	—	—	—	—	—	—	—	—	—	—	—	—	—	—
Career			8	1	3	86	64	150	34	18	0.1	0.4	10.8	8.0	18.8	4.3	2.3
