= Ken Hinkley =

Australian rules football coach and player (born 1966)

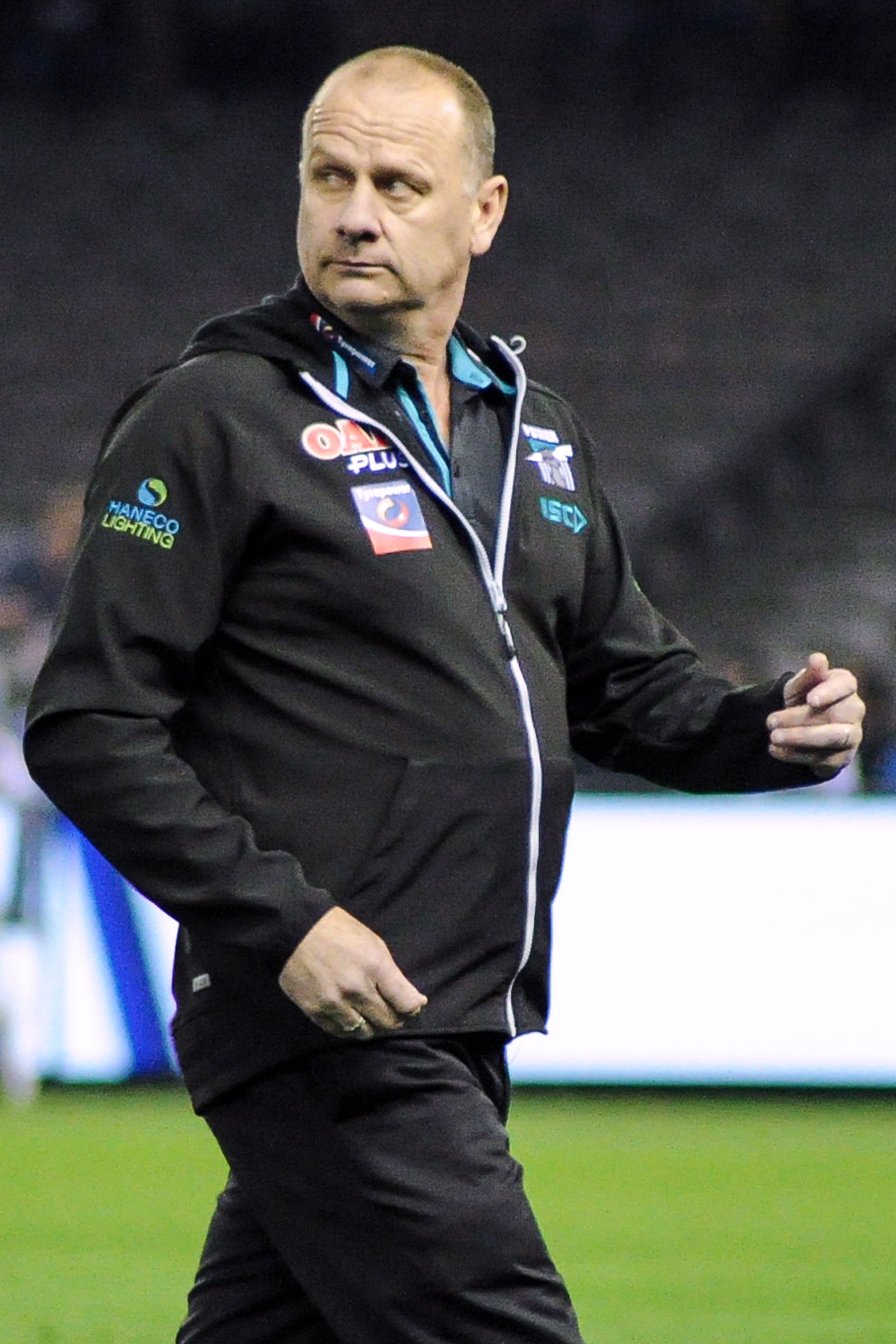
- Hinkley in April 2018

Personal information
- Full name: Ken Hinkley
- Nickname: Kenny
- Born: 30 September 1966 (age 60); Camperdown, Victoria
- Original team: Camperdown
- Height: 185 cm (6 ft 1 in)
- Weight: 80 kg (176 lb)
- Position: Half-Back Flank

Playing career
Years	Club	Games (Goals)
1987–1988	Fitzroy	11 (21)
1989–1995	Geelong	121 (58)
Total		132 (79)

Coaching career
Years	Club	Games (W–L–D)
2013–2025	Port Adelaide	297 (174–123–0)

Career highlights
- 2x AFLCA Coach of the Year (2013, 2020); Carji Greeves Medal (1992); HNFL Leading goalkicker (1983); 2x All-Australian (1991, 1992); Bell Park premiership coach (2003); Inaugural Tasmanian Devils AFL senior coach

Ken Hinkley (born 30 September 1966) is an Australian rules football coach and former player who is the senior coach of the Tasmania Football Club, which is scheduled to debut in the Australian Football League (AFL) in 2028.

Hinkley played for the Geelong and Fitzroy football clubs in the AFL from 1987 to 1995. Following his playing career, Hinkley coached the Port Adelaide Football Club for thirteen seasons between 2013 and 2025, and is the club's longest-serving AFL coach.

== Early life ==
Hinkley was born and grew up in Camperdown, Victoria. He is the 7th of 10 children. As a teenager Hinkley played for the Camperdown Football Club.

Hinkley dropped out of high school at 16 to become a semi-professional footballer with the Fitzroy Football Club in the VFL despite the club encouraging him to complete his schooling.

== Playing career ==
=== Fitzroy (1987–1988) ===
In 1987 Hinkley made his VFL debut as a forward for Fitzroy in a match against North Melbourne at Waverley Park. Hinkley did not enjoy his time in Melbourne and was approached by Geelong at the end of the 1988 VFL season.

Hinkley played for Fitzroy from 1987 until 1988 for a total of 11 games and kicked 21 goals.

=== Geelong (1989–1995) ===
Hinkley moved to Geelong for the 1989 VFL season and it was at his second club where he played his best football as a rebounding defender. Hinkley walked out of Fitzroy in 1988 and asked for a clearance to Geelong. He stood out of football for the rest of 1988 season before being traded to Geelong for the 1989 season. A half back flanker in the 1991 and 1992 All-Australian teams, Hinkley also won a Carji Greeves Medal as Geelong's best and fairest player in the 1992 AFL season. In the same year he finished third at the Brownlow Medal count, behind winner Scott Wynd and Hawthorn's Jason Dunstall. He appeared in 12 finals with Geelong, including the 1992, 1994 and 1995 Grand Final losses.

Hinkley played for Geelong from 1989 until 1995 for a total of 121 games and kicked 58 goals.

== Coaching career ==
=== Mortlake senior coach (1996–1998) ===
Retiring after the 1995 AFL Grand Final, Hinkley joined Hampden Football League club Mortlake as coach, where he remained for three seasons.

=== Camperdown senior coach (1999–2000) ===
Hinkley returned to Camperdown and coached the club to back-to-back premierships in 1999 and 2000, the former as captain-coach.

=== St Kilda assistant coach (2001) ===
St Kilda acquired his services as an assistant coach in 2001 under senior coaches Malcolm Blight and Grant Thomas, but he left the club after one season.

=== Bell Park senior coach (2002–2003) ===
The year after leaving St Kilda he took up the role of senior coach of Bell Park in the Geelong Football League and oversaw a premiership in 2003.

=== Geelong assistant coach (2004–2009) ===
He resumed his AFL coaching career in 2004, as an assistant coach under senior coach Mark Thompson at Geelong, and was part of the coaching group in their 2007 and 2009 AFL premierships. Hinkley left Geelong at the end of the 2009 season.

=== Gold Coast assistant coach (2011–2012) ===
At the end of the 2009 season, Hinkley was announced as an assistant coach at the new Gold Coast Football Club under senior coach Guy McKenna. Hinkley served as assistant coach for the Suns in their inaugural season in the 2011 season and the 2012 season. during this period, Hinkley also interviewed for the Richmond, Geelong and St Kilda senior coach positions but was unsuccessful.

=== Port Adelaide senior coach (2013–2025) ===
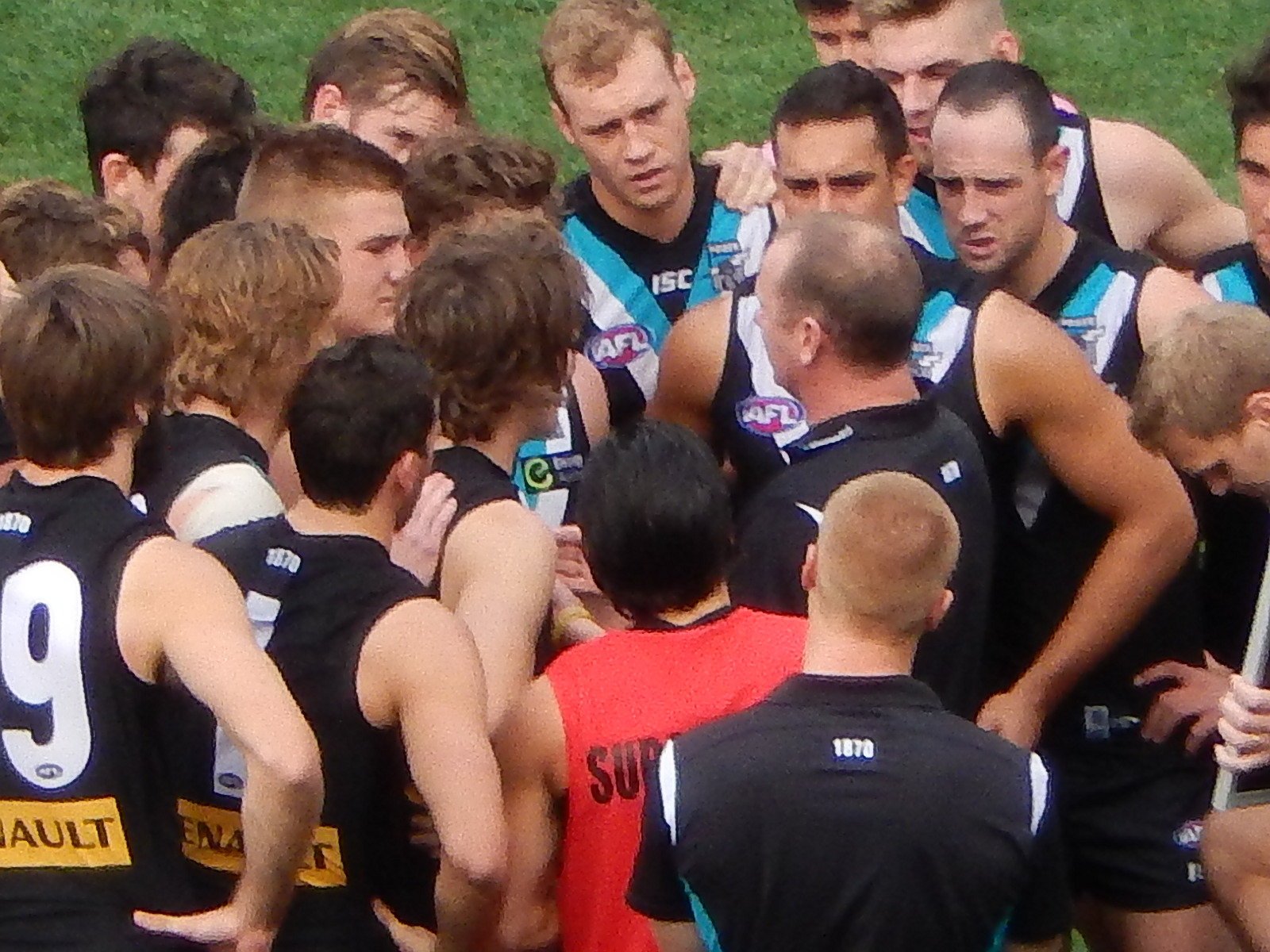
Hinkley talking to his Port Adelaide players in 2014

After the 2012 season, Hinkley was appointed senior coach of Port Adelaide; it was the first time Port Adelaide had appointed an SANFL or AFL coach who did not have a prior playing association with the club since Fos Williams in 1950. Hinkley replaced Port Adelaide caretaker senior coach Garry Hocking, who had replaced Matthew Primus after he was sacked during the 2012 season. In his debut season in 2013, Hinkley led Port Adelaide to 13 wins, which included an elimination final win at the MCG against Collingwood before being eliminated by Geelong in a close game a week later. The performance was a surprise, as Port Adelaide had only won eight games in the previous two seasons combined. For his impressive season, Hinkley was voted as the Coach of the Year by the AFL Coaches Association.

A year later, despite predictions by many that Port Adelaide would miss the finals, Hinkley led the club to a preliminary final finish; having finished the minor rounds in fifth place on the ladder, the Power defeated Richmond and Fremantle in their first two finals before losing to eventual premiers Hawthorn.

The Power narrowly missed finals in 2015 and 2016, though returned to the post-season playoffs in 2017, only to be defeated in a home elimination final against the West Coast Eagles following a kick after the siren in extra time. During this season, Hinkley's contract was extended to the end of 2021. In 2018 and 2019 the club again missed the finals, despite recording 50% or higher win-loss records in both years.

Hinkley's side saw great improvement in the COVID-19 affected 2020 season, recording its fourth AFL minor premiership. The club qualified for a home preliminary final though were defeated by reigning premiers Richmond in a tight contest at Adelaide Oval. Hinkley signed a contract extension until the end of 2023. In 2021, Port Adelaide finished second on the ladder and again reached a home preliminary final, on this occasion being comprehensively beaten by the Western Bulldogs.

The following year the club slipped out of the top eight, putting pressure on Hinkley ahead of his final contracted season in 2023. Despite the pressure, the club extended Hinkley's contract to the end of the 2025 season in mid-2023, shortly after the team locked in a top four spot and a return to finals. Port were knocked out of the finals series after consecutive losses to Brisbane and Greater Western Sydney. They were eliminated after losing their qualifying and semi-finals.

Hinkley's position came under scrutiny in 2024 following a heavy mid-season loss to Brisbane, but the club rebounded to again qualify in the top four, which culminated in a fourth preliminary final defeat, this time to Sydney. In February 2025, ahead of the final year of his contract, the club announced that Hinkley's tenure as senior coach of Port Adelaide would conclude at the end of the 2025 season, with assistant coach Josh Carr to take over in 2026 under a succession plan. Hinkley's final season was marked by indifferent form, as the side suffered five defeats in excess of 70 points and finished 13th with a 9–14 record, the worst in his thirteen seasons in the position. In his final game as coach, the team held on for a narrow four-point victory against finals contenders Gold Coast, with Hinkley's retirement coinciding with that of the club's AFL games record holder and former captain Travis Boak.

Hinkley retired as Port Adelaide's longest-serving AFL coach, and with a win-loss percentage higher than any of his predecessors. His stint at Port Adelaide holds the VFL/AFL record for the most games coached at a single club without appearing in a grand final, as well as the fifth-most games coached without winning a premiership.

=== Tasmania senior coach (2028–) ===
On 20 July 2026, Hinkley was appointed the inaugural senior coach of the Tasmania Football Club, which will enter the AFL in 2028.

== Personal life ==
Hinkley is married to high school sweetheart Donna and the couple have three children, Lisa, Bec and Jordan. Jordan Hinkley is employed by the Port Adelaide Football Club as a Football Analyst. Prior to COVID-19 one of Hinkley's daughters and her husband were also employed by the Port Adelaide Football Club.

Hinkley is a cousin of former Geelong player Gary Rohan.

Hinkley is an avid supporter of greyhound racing and is actively involved in the sport as a part-owner. He is a member of a syndicate that includes current and former players from the Port Adelaide Football Club, as well as Chris Davies, who previously was the General Manager of Football Operations for the club.

== Honours & achievements ==
=== Playing honours ===
Team

- McClelland Trophy/AFL minor premiership: (1992) Geelong
- AFL Grand Final player: (1992, 1994, 1995) Geelong

Individual

- Carji Greeves Medal: (1992)
- 2× All-Australian: (1991, 1992)
- Geelong captain: 1995

=== Coaching honours ===
Team

- McClelland Trophy/AFL minor premiership: (2020) Port Adelaide

Individual

- 2× AFLCA Coach of the Year (2013, 2020)

== Statistics ==
=== Playing statistics ===
Legend
G	Goals	K	Kicks	D	Disposals	T	Tackles
B	Behinds	H	Handballs	M	Marks

Season	Team	No.	Games	Totals							Averages (per game)						
Season	Team	No.	Games	G	B	K	H	D	M	T	G	B	K	H	D	M	T
1987	Fitzroy	48	10	20	12	79	33	112	39	8	2.0	1.2	7.9	3.3	11.2	3.9	0.8
1988	Fitzroy	22	1	1	3	15	3	18	4	0	1.0	3.0	15.0	3.0	18.0	4.0	0.0
1989	Geelong	39	1	0	0	6	2	8	0	1	0.0	0.0	6.0	2.0	8.0	0.0	1.0
1990	Geelong	39	15	27	25	149	64	213	64	10	1.8	1.7	9.9	4.3	14.2	4.3	0.7
1991	Geelong	29	24	3	10	391	110	501	114	26	0.1	0.4	16.3	4.6	20.9	4.8	1.1
1992	Geelong	29	26	8	7	443	100	543	130	32	0.3	0.3	17.0	3.8	20.9	5.0	1.2
1993	Geelong	29	16	5	7	211	89	300	56	12	0.3	0.4	13.2	5.6	18.8	3.5	0.8
1994	Geelong	29	25	2	4	306	130	436	95	26	0.1	0.2	12.2	5.2	17.4	3.8	1.0
1995	Geelong	29	14	13	14	137	59	196	37	8	0.9	1.0	9.8	4.2	14.0	2.6	0.6
Career			132	79	82	1737	590	2327	539	123	0.6	0.6	13.2	4.5	17.6	4.1	0.9

=== Coaching statistics ===
Statistics are correct to the end of the 2025 AFL season

Team	Year	Home and Away Season					Finals			
Team	Year	Won	Lost	Drew	Win %	Position	Won	Lost	Win %	Result
PA	2013*	12	9*	0	.571	7th out of 18	1	1	.500	Lost to Geelong in Semi Final
PA	2014	14	8	0	.636	5th out of 18	2	1	.667	Lost to Hawthorn in Preliminary Final
PA	2015	12	10	0	.545	9th out of 18	-	-	-	-
PA	2016	10	12	0	.456	10th out of 18	-	-	-	-
PA	2017	14	8	0	.636	5th out of 18	0	1	.000	Lost to West Coast in Elimination Final
PA	2018	12	10	0	.545	10th out of 18	-	-	-	-
PA	2019	11	11	0	.500	10th out of 18	-	-	-	-
PA	2020	14	3	0	.824	1st out of 18	1	1	.500	Lost to Richmond in Preliminary Final
PA	2021	17	5	0	.773	2nd out of 18	1	1	.500	Lost to Western Bulldogs in Preliminary Final
PA	2022*	11	10*	0	.524	11th out of 18	-	-	-	-
PA	2023	17	6	0	.739	3rd out of 18	0	2	.000	Lost to GWS in Semi Final
PA	2024	16	7	0	.670	2nd out of 18	1	2	.333	Lost to Sydney in Preliminary Final
PA	2025	9	14	0	.391	13th out of 18	-	-	-	-
Total		174	123	0	.602		6	9	.400	

*Hinkley did not coach the round 6, 2013 match due to an illness.

*Hinkley did not coach the round 18, 2022 match due to covid health and safety protocols.
