= Jack McGargill =

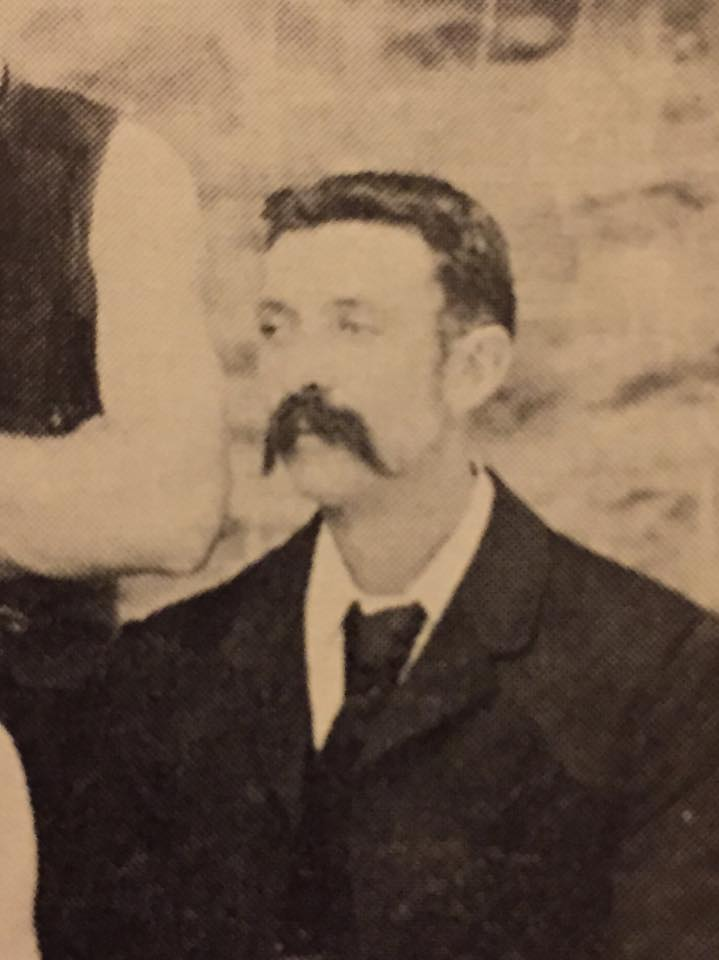

Personal information
- Full name: John McGargill
- Born: 24 January 1858; Campbells Creek, Victoria
- Died: 4 July 1937 (aged 79); Adelaide, South Australia, Australia

Coaching career
Years	Club	Games (W–L–D)
1886–1908	Port Adelaide	366 (236–116–14)

Career highlights
- Championship of Australia trainer (1890); 4× Port Adelaide premiership trainer (1890, 1897, 1903, 1906); Port Adelaide life membership (1921)

John "Jack" McGargill (c. 1859–4 July 1937) was a coach for the Port Adelaide Football Club for 23 seasons between 1886 and 1908. During his coaching career he guided Port Adelaide to four SAFA premierships and the 1890 Championship of Australia.

== Port Adelaide head trainer ==
McGargill was involved at the Port Adelaide Football Club for 45 years. He was head trainer of the club, effectively the head coach, from 1886 until 1908.

In 1926 Frank Coffey writing for the Sport (Adelaide) said of Jack McGargill "What a wonderful man is Mr. J. McGargill, head trainer of the Port Adelaide football team, a position he first occupied over 40 years ago. When I first met Jack he was massaging such men as Aleck and Ken McKenzie, Percy Gardiner. Otto LeStage, "Tick" Phillips, George Earle and other famous magenta jersey wearers in 1895. He had nothing like the present day facilities such as trestles, lockers, laundry or punching and pinching the muscles into dough, but he turned out just as good sound athletes or even better than they do to-day. One would invariably see the same twenty finish the last match of the season as they saw in the first game, which goes to show that although the game is faster to day it is also much rougher. Jack is always popular with the players, who have always been ever ready to take advantage of his good advice. Good luck to Jack and may he see many more years' service for the club he loves so well."
