= Zak Butters =

Australian rules footballer (born 2000)

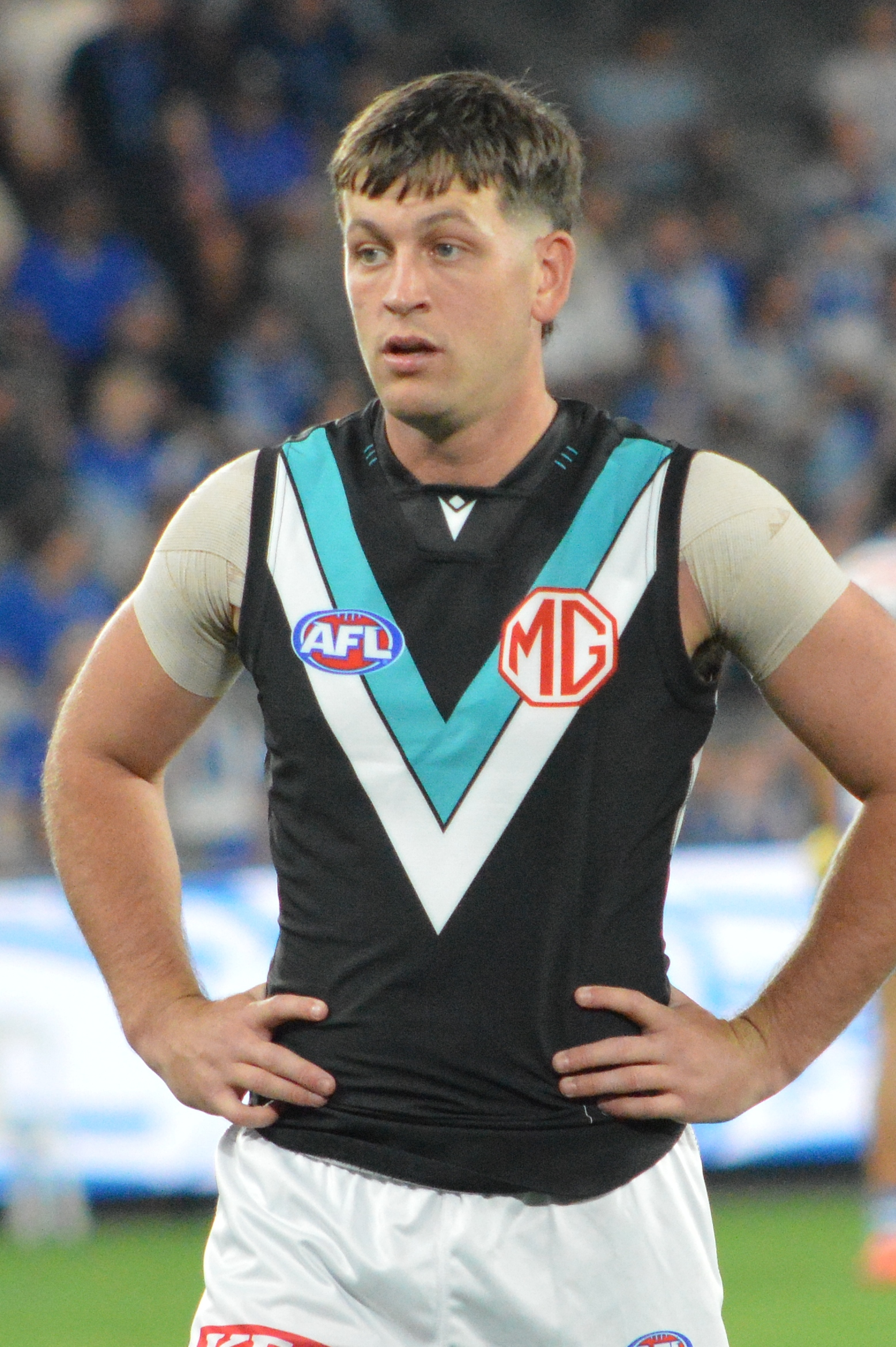
- Butters playing for Port Adelaide in 2026

Personal information
- Full name: Zak James Butters
- Born: 8 September 2000 (age 26)
- Original team: Western Jets (TAC Cup)
- Draft: No. 12, 2018 national draft
- Debut: Round 1, 2019, Port Adelaide vs. Melbourne, at the Melbourne Cricket Ground
- Height: 181 cm (5 ft 11 in)
- Weight: 78 kg (172 lb)
- Position: Midfielder

Club information
- Current club: Western Bulldogs

Playing career^{1}
Years	Club	Games (Goals)
2019–2026	Port Adelaide	156 (73)
2027–	Western Bulldogs	0 (0)
Total		156 (73)

Representative team honours^{2}
Years	Team	Games (Goals)
2026	Victoria	1 (1)
- ^{1} Playing statistics correct to the end of the 2026 season.^{2} Representative statistics correct as of 2026.

Career highlights
- AFLCA champion player of the year: 2023; 3× All-Australian team: 2023, 2024, 2026; 3× John Cahill Medal: 2023, 2024, 2025; 2× Robert Rose Award: 2023, 2024; 2x Showdown Medal: 2024 (game 2), 2026 (game 2); Peter Badcoe VC Medal: 2025

Zak James Butters (born 8 September 2000) is a professional Australian rules footballer playing for the Western Bulldogs in the Australian Football League (AFL). Originally recruited by the Port Adelaide Football Club with the twelfth pick in the 2018 national draft, he made his debut in the 2019 season. During his time with the Power, Butters won the AFLCA champion player of the year award in 2023, and is a three-time All-Australian, three-time John Cahill Medallist and dual Robert Rose Award winner.

== Early life ==
Butters grew up in Darley and attended Bacchus Marsh College and later Maribyrnong College as part of their selective sports academy. Zak Butters played for the Western Jets in the TAC Cup.

As a child, he supported the Western Bulldogs.

== AFL career ==
He was recruited by Port Adelaide with the 12th draft pick in the 2018 AFL draft.

Butters made his AFL debut in a win over Melbourne in the opening round of the 2019 AFL season kicking two goals. He was named in the 40-man All Australian squad in 2020. Following Robbie Gray's retirement in 2022, Butters changed his guernsey number from 18 to 9.

A superb season in 2023 saw Butters earn a maiden All-Australian selection, as well as win the AFLCA Champion Player of the Year Award with 109 votes. Butters finished his season with his first John Cahill Medal, awarded to Port Adelaide's best and fairest throughout the season. Prior to the 2024 season, Butters was made vice-captain of the club underneath fellow draftee Connor Rozee.

In round 19 of 2024, Butters made history by becoming the most fined player in the history of the AFL's Match Review, overtaking Toby Greene with a double fine against Richmond. Butters won his first Showdown Medal in Showdown LVI against cross-town rival Adelaide. Butters' 42 disposals was the most of any individual in a Showdown. Butters won his second John Cahill Medal as Port Adelaide's best and fairest in 2024.

In 2025, Butters won his third consecutive Best and Fairest at Port Adelaide.

After much speculation, Butters informed Port Adelaide that he would be leaving the club as a free agent in August 2026. Two weeks later, Butters nominated the Western Bulldogs as his club of choice, and finally joined the Bulldogs during the 2026 trade period.

=== Umpire controversy ===
On 12 April 2026, during Gather Round against St Kilda, Butters was involved in an on-field altercation with field umpire Nick Foot following a holding free kick, with allegations raised regarding verbal remarks made during the incident. Foot stated that Butters said, “How much are they paying you?”, which he interpreted as questioning his integrity, and awarded a 50-metre penalty in favour of St Kilda, while Butters maintained that he instead asked a question relating to the decision itself. Port Adelaide chairman David Koch described the situation as a “miscommunication”, stating that Butters had asked, “Why did you pay that free kick?”, rather than making any comment questioning the umpire’s integrity. Two days later Butters was found guilty of umpire abuse at the AFL Tribunal and fined $1,500, despite Butters and teammate Ollie Wines maintaining that no abusive language was used.

== Statistics ==
Updated to the end of the 2026 season.

Legend
G	Goals	K	Kicks	D	Disposals	T	Tackles
B	Behinds	H	Handballs	M	Marks

Season	Team	No.	Games	Totals							Averages (per game)							Votes
Season	Team	No.	Games	G	B	K	H	D	M	T	G	B	K	H	D	M	T	Votes
2019	Port Adelaide	18	19	12	7	137	132	269	51	48	0.6	0.4	7.2	6.9	14.2	2.7	2.5	0
2020 (Note: The 2020 season was played with 17 home-and-away matches per team (down from 22) and 16-minute quarters with time on (down from 20-minute quarters with time on) due to the impact of the COVID-19 pandemic.)	Port Adelaide	18	17	11	6	129	119	248	55	47	0.6	0.4	7.6	7.0	14.6	3.2	2.8	2
2021	Port Adelaide	18	12	8	2	111	114	225	50	42	0.7	0.2	9.3	9.5	18.8	4.2	3.5	1
2022	Port Adelaide	18	20	10	9	250	193	443	79	75	0.5	0.5	12.5	9.7	22.2	4.0	3.8	3
2023	Port Adelaide	9	25	13	8	361	326	687	126	86	0.5	0.3	14.4	13.0	27.5	5.0	3.4	27
2024	Port Adelaide	9	26	13	13	370	335	705	123	107	0.5	0.5	14.2	12.9	27.1	4.7	4.1	29
2025	Port Adelaide	9	20	1	6	272	287	559	71	102	0.1	0.3	13.6	14.4	28.0	3.6	5.1	21
2026	Port Adelaide	9	17	5	10	289	217	506	59	72	0.3	0.6	17.0	12.8	29.8	3.5	4.2	26
Career			156	73	61	1919	1723	3642	614	579	0.5	0.4	12.3	11.0	23.3	3.9	3.7	109

== Honours and achievements ==
Team

- AFL minor premiership/McClelland Trophy (Port Adelaide): 2020

Representative

- Victoria representative honours in AFL State of Origin: 2026

Individual

- AFLCA champion player of the year: 2023
- 3× All-Australian team: 2023, 2024, 2026
- 3× John Cahill Medal: 2023, 2024, 2025
- 2× Robert Rose Award: 2023, 2024
- Showdown Medal: 2024 (game 2)
- Peter Badcoe VC Medal: 2025
