= Jordon Sweet =

Australian football league player

Personal information
- Full name: Jordon Ronald Sweet
- Born: 2 February 1998 (age 28)
- Original team: North Adelaide (SANFL)
- Draft: No. 23, 2019 AFL rookie draft, Western Bulldogs
- Debut: Round 5, 2021, Western Bulldogs vs. Gold Coast, at Docklands Stadium
- Height: 206 cm (6 ft 9 in)
- Weight: 103 kg (227 lb)
- Position: Ruck

Club information
- Current club: Port Adelaide
- Number: 24

Playing career^{1}
Years	Club	Games (Goals)
2019–2023	Western Bulldogs	11 (2)
2024–	Port Adelaide	56 (16)
Total		65 (18)
- ^{1} Playing statistics correct to the end of round 22, 2026.

Career highlights
- SANFL premiership player: 2018

Jordon Ronald Sweet (born 2 February 1998) is an Australian rules footballer who plays for the Port Adelaide Football Club in the Australian Football League (AFL). He was recruited by the Western Bulldogs with the 23rd draft pick in the 2019 AFL rookie draft. He previously played for the Western Bulldogs.

== Early football ==
Sweet began his football career at Ingle Farm Junior Football Club in the inner north of Adelaide. He played from 2010 to 2011 in the Under 12s and 14 divisions, playing a total of 41 games with the club before moving to Tea Tree Gully Football Club, where he played 35 games in the Under 15s and Under 16s revisions. He then stepped up and began playing for North Adelaide, playing eight games over two years, including a premiership in the latter where he kicked one goal and had 24 hitouts.

== AFL career ==
=== Western Bulldogs (2019–2023) ===
Sweet stayed behind other young ruckman Tim English in the pecking order of team selection. He got his chance to debut when main ruckman Stefan Martin was rested in the 5th round of the 2021 AFL season. On debut, Sweet collected eight disposals and 31 hitouts. He was omitted the next week, but again returned in Round 8 when Martin was out with Achilles soreness. He kicked his first career goal in that game.

=== Port Adelaide (2024–present) ===
At the conclusion of the 2023 AFL season, Sweet requested a trade back to his native South Australia to play for Port Adelaide. Sweet made his debut for Port Adelaide during Round 6 of the 2024 AFL season at the MCG against Collingwood.

== Statistics ==
Updated to the end of round 22, 2026.

Legend
G	Goals	K	Kicks	D	Disposals	T	Tackles
B	Behinds	H	Handballs	M	Marks	H/O	Hit-outs

Season	Team	No.	Games	Totals								Averages (per game)								Votes
Season	Team	No.	Games	G	B	K	H	D	M	T	H/O	G	B	K	H	D	M	T	H/O	Votes
2019	Western Bulldogs	41	0	—	—	—	—	—	—	—	—	—	—	—	—	—	—	—	—	0
2020 (Note: The 2020 season was played with 17 home-and-away matches per team (down from 22) and 16-minute quarters with time on (down from 20-minute quarters with time on) due to the impact of the COVID-19 pandemic.)	Western Bulldogs	41	0	—	—	—	—	—	—	—	—	—	—	—	—	—	—	—	—	0
2021	Western Bulldogs	41	5	1	2	21	22	43	12	19	99	0.2	0.4	4.2	4.4	8.6	2.4	3.8	19.8	0
2022	Western Bulldogs	41	6	1	0	21	26	47	9	25	136	0.2	0.0	3.5	4.3	7.8	1.5	4.2	22.7	0
2023	Western Bulldogs	41	0	—	—	—	—	—	—	—	—	—	—	—	—	—	—	—	—	0
2024	Port Adelaide	24	17	4	4	71	97	168	35	85	598	0.2	0.2	4.2	5.7	9.9	2.1	5.0	35.2	0
2025	Port Adelaide	24	19	4	3	92	121	213	36	68	708	0.2	0.2	4.8	6.4	11.2	1.9	3.6	37.3	0
2026	Port Adelaide	24	20	8	17	129	118	247	41	50	620	0.4	0.9	6.5	5.9	12.4	2.1	2.5	31.0	0
Career			67	18	26	334	384	718	133	247	2161	0.3	0.4	5.0	5.7	10.7	2.0	3.7	32.3	0
