= Tim English =

Australian rules footballer

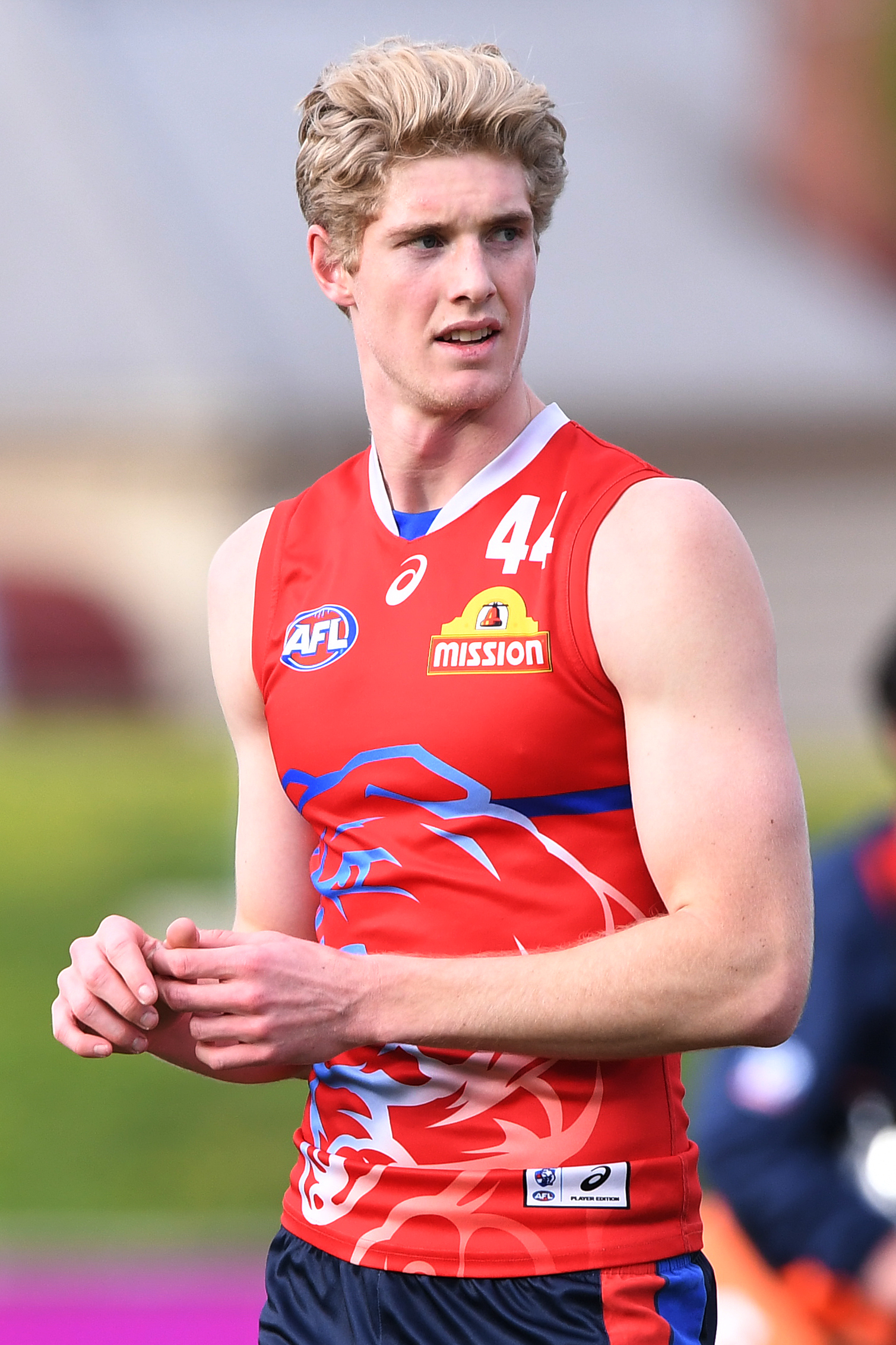
- English in August 2018

Personal information
- Full name: Timothy English
- Nickname: Johnny
- Born: 10 August 1997 (age 29); Perth, Western Australia
- Original team: South Fremantle (WAFL)/Christ Church Grammar (PSA)
- Draft: No. 19, 2016 national draft
- Debut: Round 10, 2017, Western Bulldogs vs. St Kilda, at Etihad Stadium
- Height: 208 cm (6 ft 10 in)
- Weight: 103 kg (227 lb)
- Position: Ruck

Club information
- Current club: Western Bulldogs
- Number: 44

Playing career^{1}
Years	Club	Games (Goals)
2017–	Western Bulldogs	169 (96)

Representative team honours
Years	Team	Games (Goals)
2026	Western Australia	1 (0)
- ^{1} Playing statistics correct to the end of round 22, 2026.

Career highlights
- All-Australian team: 2023; 22under22 team: 2019

Timothy English (born 10 August 1997) is a professional Australian rules footballer playing for the Western Bulldogs in the Australian Football League (AFL). He was drafted by the Western Bulldogs with their first selection and nineteenth overall in the 2016 national draft.

== Early life ==
English was born in Perth, Western Australia. He grew up on a wheat and sheep farm in Pingelly, a town of about 1200. He attended Christ Church Grammar School in Perth, where he was Boarding Captain.

== AFL career ==
English was drafted by the Western Bulldogs with their first selection and nineteenth overall in the 2016 national draft. He made his debut in the forty point win against St Kilda at Etihad Stadium in round ten of the 2017 season. He arrived at the club weighing 87 kilograms, and by 2019 he weighed 100 kilograms.

== Statistics ==
Updated to the end of round 22, 2026.

Legend
G	Goals	K	Kicks	D	Disposals	T	Tackles
B	Behinds	H	Handballs	M	Marks	H/O	Hit-outs

Season	Team	No.	Games	Totals								Averages (per game)								Votes
Season	Team	No.	Games	G	B	K	H	D	M	T	H/O	G	B	K	H	D	M	T	H/O	Votes
2017	Western Bulldogs	44	2	0	0	1	13	14	2	6	11	0.0	0.0	0.5	6.5	7.0	1.0	3.0	5.5	0
2018	Western Bulldogs	44	7	1	2	49	42	91	33	11	97	0.1	0.3	7.0	6.0	13.0	4.7	1.6	13.9	0
2019	Western Bulldogs	44	20	8	10	135	129	264	81	68	383	0.4	0.5	6.8	6.5	13.2	4.1	3.4	19.2	1
2020 (Note: The 2020 season was played with 17 home-and-away matches per team (down from 22) and 16-minute quarters with time on (down from 20-minute quarters with time on) due to the impact of the COVID-19 pandemic.)	Western Bulldogs	44	18	8	11	129	113	242	77	39	287	0.4	0.6	7.2	6.3	13.4	4.3	2.2	15.9	4
2021	Western Bulldogs	44	22	19	15	164	126	290	103	63	341	0.9	0.7	7.5	5.7	13.2	4.7	2.9	15.5	3
2022	Western Bulldogs	44	16	11	9	164	125	289	87	41	379	0.7	0.6	10.3	7.8	18.1	5.4	2.6	23.7	6
2023	Western Bulldogs	44	23	16	4	258	182	440	145	100	717	0.7	0.2	11.2	7.9	19.1	6.3	4.3	31.2	11
2024	Western Bulldogs	44	23	14	10	204	175	379	138	87	622	0.6	0.4	8.9	7.6	16.5	6.0	3.8	27.0	0
2025	Western Bulldogs	44	23	13	15	232	178	410	141	77	696	0.6	0.7	10.1	7.7	17.8	6.1	3.3	30.3	8
2026	Western Bulldogs	44	15	6	2	120	101	221	71	37	342	0.4	0.1	8.0	6.7	14.7	4.7	2.5	22.8	0
Career			169	96	78	1456	1184	2640	878	529	3875	0.6	0.5	8.6	7.0	15.6	5.2	3.1	22.9	33
