= Connor Rozee =

Australian rules footballer (born 2000)

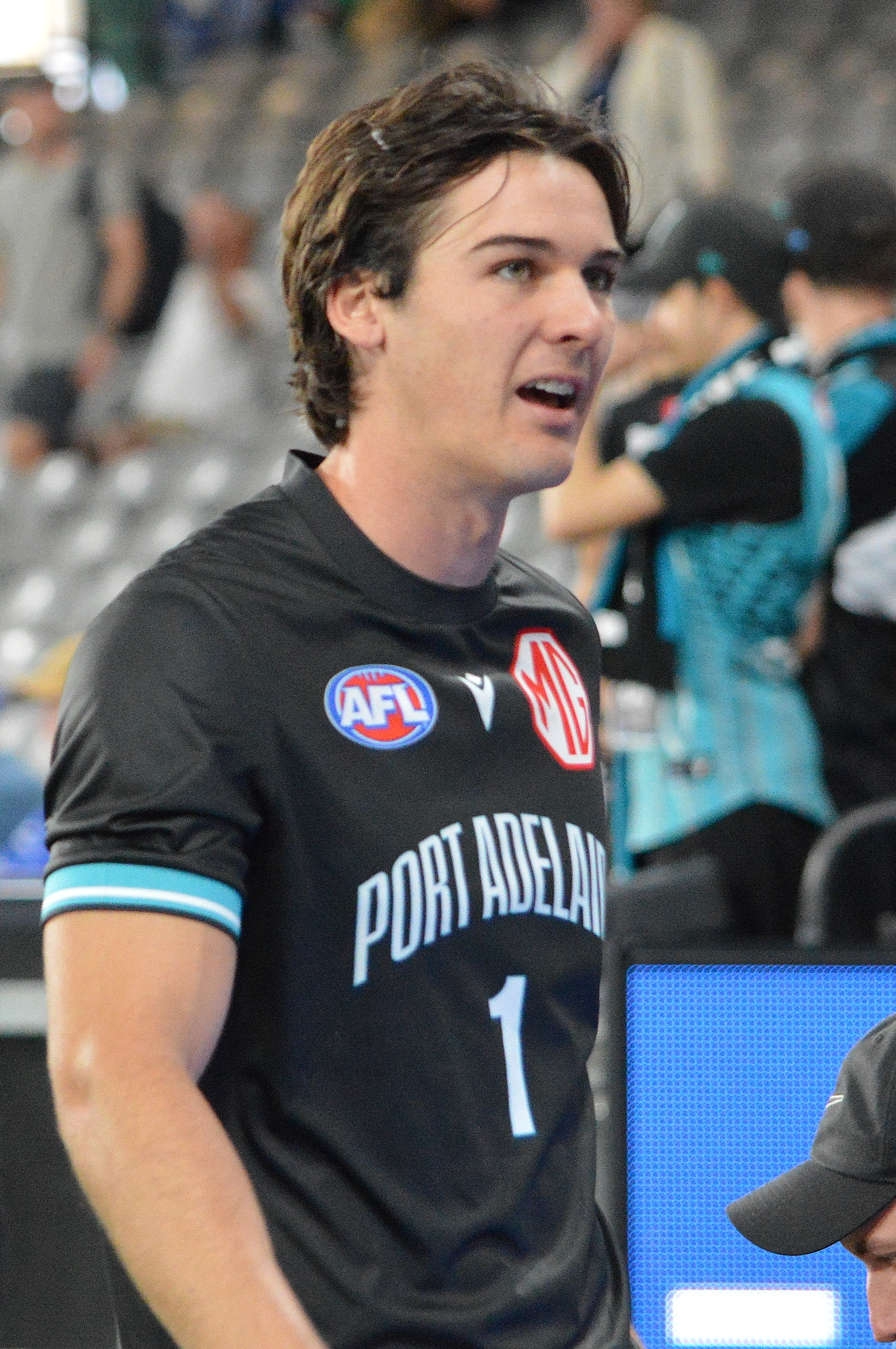
- Rozee in March 2026

Personal information
- Full name: Connor Robert Rozee
- Born: 22 January 2000 (age 26); Port Augusta, South Australia
- Original team: North Adelaide (SANFL)
- Draft: No. 5, 2018 AFL draft (Port Adelaide)
- Debut: 23 March 2019, Port Adelaide vs. Melbourne, at MCG
- Height: 185 cm (6 ft)
- Weight: 80 kg (176 lb)
- Position: Midfielder / forward

Club information
- Current club: Port Adelaide
- Number: 1

Playing career^{1}
| Years | Club | Games (Goals) |
| 2019– | Port Adelaide | 152 (124) |
- ^{1} Playing statistics correct to the end of round 22, 2026.

Career highlights
- AFL: Port Adelaide captain: 2024–; John Cahill Medal: 2022; 2× All Australian: 2022, 2023; Port Adelaide leading goalkicker: 2019; Gavin Wanganeen Medal: 2019; 2× 22under22 team: 2019, 2022; AFL Rising Star nominee: 2019; 2× Peter Badcoe VC Medal: 2022, 2023; Showdown Medal: 2022, 2025; SANFL: SANFL Premiership player: 2018

Connor Robert Rozee (born 22 January 2000) is a professional Australian rules footballer who is the current captain of the Port Adelaide Football Club in the Australian Football League (AFL). He was recruited by Port Adelaide with the fifth draft pick of the 2018 AFL draft.

== Early life ==
Rozee was born in Port Augusta, South Australia. He participated in the Auskick program at Port Augusta and played junior football with Spencer Gulf Football League (SGFL) club South Augusta. After he finished primary school, Rozee's family moved to the suburbs of Adelaide where he attended Cedar College. In 2016, he won the Kevin Sheehan Medal as the best player of the Under 16 AFL National Championship while also winning South Australia's Most Valuable Player award. Rozee played for South Australia in the AFL Under 18 Championships but was not pleased with his performance. He averaged 13 disposals across the carnival, showed some flashes and his state claimed the title, but it wasn't the standout period he was hoping for.

After the championship, Port Adelaide AFL premiership player and North Adelaide Football Club coach Josh Carr gave Rozee his senior South Australian National Football League (SANFL) debut in 2018 and Rozee repaid his faith with an impressive campaign including a couple of vital performances in the Roosters’ successful finals series. Rozee went on to feature in the club's SANFL premiership win, with his improved form at the back end of the season against senior players showing why he is in the elite group of prospects at the top end of the draft. At the AFL Draft Combine, Rozee finished in the top 10 for the standing vertical jump and running vertical jump tests and agility test and was second overall in the 20m sprint (2.91 seconds). Port Adelaide selected Rozee at pick 5 in the 2018 AFL draft.

Rozee's father Robert Rozee played for SANFL club South Adelaide and was a premiership player, club champion and club coach at South Augusta.

== AFL career ==
Rozee made his AFL debut in Port Adelaide's upset win over Melbourne in the opening round of the 2019 AFL season. In Round 2, He kicked his first AFL goal and his second only minutes later in a win over Carlton. In round 3, Rozee kicked five goals and had 21 disposals in Port's 17 point loss to the Brisbane Lions at the Gabba, earning him the Rising Star nomination. Rozee became the youngest Port Adelaide player to kick 5 goals in an AFL match. He also in 2019 went on to be Port Adelaide's youngest ever leading goalscorer and named into the AFL's 22under22 team.

After a promising first season, Rozee lacked a little bit of form to start the 2020 AFL season with shaping into a midfield role and over unfortunate events, the season was postponed due to the COVID-19 pandemic.

Throughout the 2022 AFL season, Port Adelaide lacked midifield depth leading to Rozee earning himself plenty of minutes on-ball. This led to his first All-Australian selection, being named on the interchange. His midfield success continued in the 2023 AFL season where he earnt his second All-Australian selection, at half-forward. Following his second consecutive All-Australian selection, Rozee was appointed Port Adelaide's captain in December 2023.

For majority of the 2025 AFL season, Rozee took on a new role playing on the half-back flank for Port Adelaide.

== Personal life ==
Rozee married Maisie Packer on 26 October 2024. The couple have a daughter, born in May 2024, and are expecting a son. Connor also spent his early years play at Broadview Football Club in Broadview, Adelaide.

== Statistics ==
Updated to the end of round 22, 2026.

Legend
| G | Goals | K | Kicks | D | Disposals | T | Tackles |
| B | Behinds | H | Handballs | M | Marks |

| Season | Team | No. | Games | Totals | | | | | | | Averages (per game) | | | | | | | Votes |
| Season | Team | No. | Games | G | B | K | H | D | M | T | G | B | K | H | D | M | T | Votes |
|---|---|---|---|---|---|---|---|---|---|---|---|---|---|---|---|---|---|---|
| 2019 | Port Adelaide | 20 | 22 | 29 | 22 | 168 | 168 | 336 | 76 | 88 | 1.3 | 1.0 | 7.6 | 7.6 | 15.3 | 3.5 | 4.0 | 4 |
| 2020 (Note: The 2020 season was played with 17 home-and-away matches per team (down from 22) and 16-minute quarters with time on (down from 20-minute quarters with time on) due to the impact of the COVID-19 pandemic.) | Port Adelaide | 20 | 16 | 9 | 9 | 106 | 100 | 206 | 40 | 53 | 0.6 | 0.6 | 6.6 | 6.3 | 12.9 | 2.5 | 3.3 | 0 |
| 2021 | Port Adelaide | 20 | 21 | 21 | 13 | 176 | 159 | 335 | 71 | 60 | 1.0 | 0.6 | 8.4 | 7.6 | 16.0 | 3.4 | 2.9 | 1 |
| 2022 | Port Adelaide | 20 | 22 | 18 | 14 | 248 | 262 | 510 | 89 | 84 | 0.8 | 0.6 | 11.3 | 11.9 | 23.2 | 4.0 | 3.8 | 14 |
| 2023 | Port Adelaide | 20 | 25 | 21 | 18 | 390 | 254 | 644 | 117 | 117 | 0.8 | 0.7 | 15.6 | 10.2 | 25.8 | 4.7 | 4.7 | 21 |
| 2024 | Port Adelaide | 1 | 23 | 15 | 16 | 335 | 208 | 543 | 98 | 102 | 0.7 | 0.7 | 14.6 | 9.0 | 23.6 | 4.3 | 4.4 | 12 |
| 2025 | Port Adelaide | 1 | 21 | 11 | 7 | 378 | 198 | 576 | 102 | 79 | 0.5 | 0.3 | 18.0 | 9.4 | 27.4 | 4.9 | 3.8 | 16 |
| 2026 | Port Adelaide | 1 | 2 | 0 | 0 | 25 | 20 | 45 | 9 | 6 | 0.0 | 0.0 | 12.5 | 10.0 | 22.5 | 4.5 | 3.0 | 0 |
| Career | | | 152 | 124 | 99 | 1826 | 1369 | 3195 | 602 | 589 | 0.8 | 0.7 | 12.0 | 9.0 | 21.0 | 4.0 | 3.9 | 68 |
