= Josh Carr =

Australian rules footballer (born 1980)

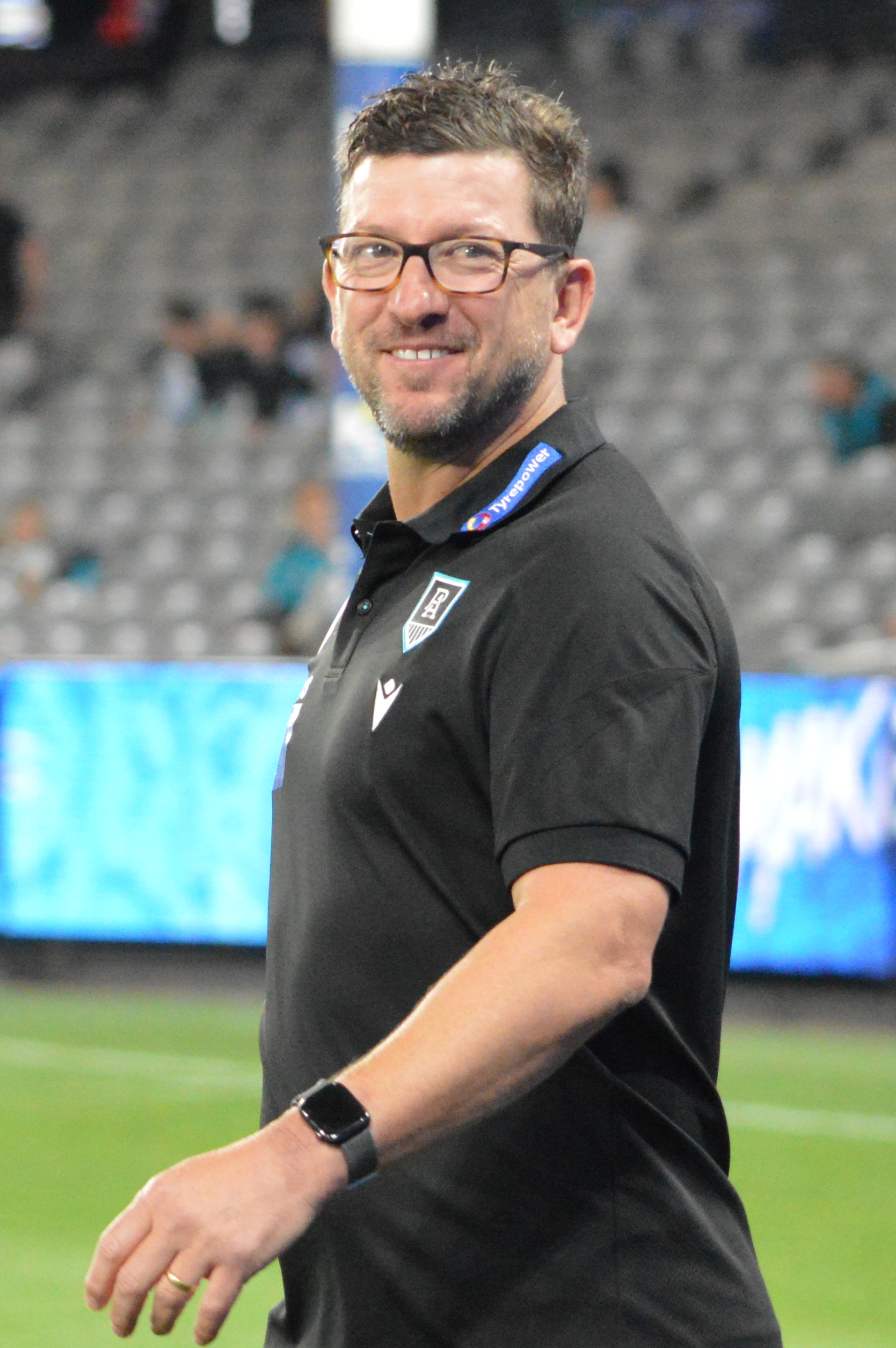
- Carr coaching Port Adelaide in March 2026

Personal information
- Full name: Joshua Carr
- Born: 29 April 1980 (age 46)
- Original team: East Fremantle (WAFL)
- Draft: 7th overall, 1998; Port Adelaide
- Height: 178 cm (5 ft 10 in)
- Weight: 80 kg (176 lb)
- Position: Midfielder

Playing career
| Years | Club | Games (Goals) |
| 2000–2004 | Port Adelaide | 105 (60) |
| 2005–2008 | Fremantle | 83 (44) |
| 2009–2010 | Port Adelaide | 19 (5) |
| Total | | 207 (109) |

Coaching career^{3}
| Years | Club | Games (W–L–D) |
| 2026– | Port Adelaide | 23 (7–16–0) |
- ^{3} Coaching statistics correct as of round 24, 2026.

Career highlights
- AFL premiership player: 2004; AFL Rising Star nominee: 2000; Port Adelaide Best First Year Player: 2000; Port Adelaide pre-season premiership side: 2001, 2002; Port Adelaide Most Improved Player: 2001; Port Adelaide Best Team Man: 2002, 2003; Peter Badcoe VC Medal: (Port Adelaide) 2004; Ross Glendinning Medal: (Fremantle) 2007; North Adelaide premiership coach: 2018

Joshua Carr (born 29 April 1980) is the current senior coach of the Port Adelaide Football Club, having been a former Australian rules footballer who played for Port Adelaide and Fremantle in the Australian Football League (AFL). He was drafted by Port Adelaide in the 1998 AFL draft and made his debut for the club in 2000. After playing in the Power's 2004 premiership side, he moved to Western Australia in 2005 to play for the Fremantle Football Club, where he played alongside his elder brother Matthew Carr for four seasons. He returned to Port Adelaide in 2009 and played a further two seasons before retiring at the end of the 2010 season.

After his retirement, Carr continued on with the Power as an assistant coach between 2011 and 2015. He then moved to the South Australian National Football League (SANFL) and coached North Adelaide from 2016 to 2019, leading the club to the premiership in 2018. In October 2019, he re-joined Fremantle as an assistant coach for the 2020 season. Carr returned to Port Adelaide as an assistant coach in 2023, and was appointed senior coach of the side ahead of the 2026 season.

== AFL playing career ==
=== Port Adelaide (2000–2004) ===
Carr joined Port Adelaide after being picked up by the club in the 1998 AFL Draft. In his first season in 1999 he did not play a game due to injury. Carr debuted for Port Adelaide in Round 8, 2000, against Melbourne at the MCG and in 2000, he became a regular player in the first team, and in 2001 he became one of Port's key players, winning the best team man award. In 2002, Carr was said to be a key instigator of the famous Ramsgate fight between Crows and Port players after Showdown XI. By 2004 his leadership abilities had seen him appointed Vice Captain underneath Warren Tredrea. He played in the 2004 Port Adelaide premiership team before announcing he wanted to join Fremantle in 2005 to play alongside brother Matthew Carr.

Carr played for Port Adelaide from 2000 until 2004 for total of 105 games and kicked 60 goals and was a member of the 2004 Port Adelaide premiership team.

=== Fremantle (2005–2008) ===
Port eventually traded him and he returned to Western Australia at the beginning of the 2005 season.

Carr was named as Fremantle's vice-captain for the 2007 & 2008 seasons. He won the Ross Glendinning medal in the second Western Derby of 2007, gathering 26 possessions and kicking three goals as Fremantle notched up their eighth win over West Coast.

During the 2008 he began to question his career at Fremantle due to his brothers retirement. At the end of the 2008 season, Carr told the club that he wanted to be traded back to Port Adelaide for personal reasons. He played 83 games for Fremantle in four seasons.

Carr played for Fremantle from 2005 until 2008 for a total of 83 games and kicked 44 goals.

=== Return to Port Adelaide (2009–2010) ===
He was drafted at number 2 by the Power in the 2008 Pre-Season Draft and played his 200th AFL game against Carlton in round 20, 2009. On 19 July 2010, Carr announced he would retire following Showdown XXIX at AAMI Stadium. He ended his playing career with a 19-point win, marking an impressive 10–0 record in Showdowns.

Carr played for Port Adelaide in his second tenure for the club from 2009 until 2010 for a total of 19 games and kicked 5 goals.

== Coaching career ==
=== Port Adelaide assistant coach (2011–2015) ===
Between 2011 and 2015, Carr served as an assistant coach for Port Adelaide under senior coaches Matthew Primus, Garry Hocking and Ken Hinkley.

=== North Adelaide Football Club senior coach (SANFL) (2016–2019) ===
Between 2016 and 2019, he served as senior coach of the North Adelaide Roosters in the SANFL, guiding the club to the premiership in 2018. A premiership marred by a 19 man saga with Woodville West Torrens the week before which resulted in his team losing 4 points and North Adelaide paying a $10,000 fine.

=== Fremantle Football Club assistant coach (2019–2021) ===
In October 2019, Carr was appointed by Fremantle as an assistant coach for the 2020 season under senior coach Justin Longmuir. On July 30, 2021, the club announced that Carr had stood down for an unstated period after he was fined by police for breaching WA quarantine restrictions.

=== Port Adelaide assistant coach (2023–25) ===
Carr returned to Port Adelaide Football Club as senior assistant coach under senior coach Ken Hinkley for the 2023 season.

=== Port Adelaide senior coach (2026 onwards) ===
In February 2025, Port Adelaide president David Koch announced that Carr would assume the position as senior coach of Port Adelaide ahead of the 2026 season, at the conclusion of Ken Hinkley's last contracted year in a succession plan. Carr has been signed to a three-year contract, taking him through to the end of the 2028 season.

== Playing statistics ==
Legend
| G | Goals | K | Kicks | D | Disposals | T | Tackles |
| B | Behinds | H | Handballs | M | Marks |

| Season | Team | No. | Games | Totals | | | | | | | Averages (per game) | | | | | | |
| Season | Team | No. | Games | G | B | K | H | D | M | T | G | B | K | H | D | M | T |
|---|---|---|---|---|---|---|---|---|---|---|---|---|---|---|---|---|---|
| 1999 | Port Adelaide | 25 | 0 | – | – | – | – | – | – | – | – | – | – | – | – | – | – |
| 2000 | Port Adelaide | 25 | 14 | 2 | 3 | 115 | 58 | 173 | 39 | 21 | 0.1 | 0.2 | 8.2 | 4.1 | 12.4 | 2.8 | 1.5 |
| 2001 | Port Adelaide | 25 | 24 | 18 | 9 | 266 | 124 | 390 | 108 | 55 | 0.8 | 0.4 | 11.1 | 5.2 | 16.3 | 4.5 | 2.3 |
| 2002 | Port Adelaide | 9 | 25 | 13 | 11 | 263 | 151 | 414 | 88 | 73 | 0.5 | 0.4 | 10.5 | 6.0 | 16.6 | 3.5 | 2.9 |
| 2003 | Port Adelaide | 9 | 23 | 16 | 13 | 296 | 130 | 426 | 90 | 69 | 0.7 | 0.6 | 12.9 | 5.7 | 18.5 | 3.9 | 3.0 |
| 2004^{#} | Port Adelaide | 9 | 19 | 11 | 6 | 195 | 161 | 356 | 65 | 58 | 0.6 | 0.3 | 10.3 | 8.5 | 18.7 | 3.4 | 3.1 |
| 2005 | Fremantle | 2 | 22 | 12 | 7 | 269 | 175 | 444 | 81 | 86 | 0.5 | 0.3 | 12.2 | 8.0 | 20.2 | 3.7 | 3.9 |
| 2006 | Fremantle | 2 | 23 | 7 | 9 | 252 | 229 | 481 | 129 | 88 | 0.3 | 0.4 | 11.0 | 10.0 | 20.9 | 5.6 | 3.8 |
| 2007 | Fremantle | 2 | 20 | 14 | 6 | 248 | 171 | 419 | 102 | 79 | 0.7 | 0.3 | 12.4 | 8.6 | 21.0 | 5.1 | 4.0 |
| 2008 | Fremantle | 2 | 18 | 11 | 4 | 163 | 140 | 303 | 64 | 84 | 0.6 | 0.2 | 9.1 | 7.8 | 16.8 | 3.6 | 4.7 |
| 2009 | Port Adelaide | 2 | 12 | 4 | 1 | 70 | 102 | 172 | 37 | 45 | 0.3 | 0.1 | 5.8 | 8.5 | 14.3 | 3.1 | 3.8 |
| 2010 | Port Adelaide | 2 | 7 | 1 | 1 | 56 | 51 | 107 | 22 | 25 | 0.1 | 0.1 | 8.0 | 7.3 | 15.3 | 3.1 | 3.6 |
| Career | | | 207 | 109 | 70 | 2193 | 1492 | 3685 | 825 | 683 | 0.5 | 0.3 | 10.6 | 7.2 | 17.8 | 4.0 | 3.3 |

== Head coaching record ==
| Team | Year | Home and Away Season | | | | | Finals | | | |
| Team | Year | Won | Lost | Drew | Win % | Finished | Won | Lost | Win % | Result |
|---|---|---|---|---|---|---|---|---|---|---|
| PA | 2026 | 7 | 16 | 0 | .304 | 15th out of 18 | – | – | – | – |
| | | 7 | 16 | 0 | .304 | | 0 | 0 | 0 | |
