= 2016–17 W-League =

Ninth season of top Australian women's football (soccer) league

W-League
- Season: 2016–17
- Champions: Melbourne City (2nd title)
- Premiers: Canberra United (3rd title)
- Matches: 57
- Goals: 200 (3.51 per match)
- Top goalscorer: Ashleigh Sykes (12 goals)
- Biggest home win: Adelaide United 10–2 Western Sydney Wanderers (14 January 2017)
- Biggest away win: Melbourne Victory 0–4 Newcastle Jets (20 November 2016)
- Highest scoring: Adelaide United 10–2 Western Sydney Wanderers (14 January 2017)
- Longest winning run: Melbourne City (4 games)
- Longest unbeaten run: Canberra United; Perth Glory (6 games)
- Longest winless run: Melbourne Victory (8 games)
- Longest losing run: Melbourne Victory (4 games)
- Highest attendance: 4,591; Canberra United vs. Melbourne City (5 February 2017)
- Lowest attendance: 264; Melbourne Victory vs. Perth Glory (4 December 2016)
- Average attendance: 1,547

The 2016–17 W-League season was the ninth season of the W-League, the Australian national women's association football competition.

== Clubs ==
=== Stadia and locations ===
Team	Location	Stadium	Capacity
Adelaide United	Adelaide	Elite Systems Football Centre; Coopers Stadium	200; 17,000
Brisbane Roar	Brisbane	A.J. Kelly Park; Suncorp Stadium	1,500; 52,500
Canberra United	Canberra	McKellar Park	3,500
Melbourne City	Melbourne	CB Smith Reserve; AAMI Park	2,000; 30,050
Melbourne Victory	Melbourne	Lakeside Stadium; Epping Stadium; AAMI Park	12,000; 10,000; 30,050
Newcastle Jets	Newcastle	McDonald Jones Stadium	33,000
Perth Glory	Perth	Dorrien Gardens	4,000
Sydney FC	Sydney	Lambert Park	7,000
Western Sydney Wanderers	Sydney	Marconi Stadium; Popondetta Park	9,000; 2,500

=== Personnel and kits ===
Team	Manager	Captain	Kit sponsors
Adelaide United	(Australia) Huss Skenderovic	(Australia) Stella Rigon	Macron
Brisbane Roar	(Australia) Melissa Andreatta	(Australia) Clare Polkinghorne	Puma, Umbro
Canberra United	(Australia) Rae Dower	(Australia) Ellie Brush (Australia) Michelle Heyman	Nike; University of Canberra
Melbourne City	(Wales) Jess Fishlock	(Australia) Steph Catley	Nike
Melbourne Victory	(Wales) Jeff Hopkins	(United States) Christine Nairn	Adidas
Newcastle Jets	(Australia) Craig Deans	(Australia) Gema Simon	BLK
Perth Glory	(Australia) Bobby Despotovski	(Australia) Sam Kerr	Healthway, National Storage, Goodlife, Macron
Sydney FC	(Australia) Daniel Barrett	(Australia) Teresa Polias	Puma
Western Sydney Wanderers	(Australia) Richard Byrne	(Australia) Caitlin Cooper	Nike

=== Foreign players ===
Club	Visa 1	Visa 2	Visa 3	Visa 4	Non-Visa foreigner(s)	Former player(s)
Adelaide United	(Brazil) Mônica	(Mexico) Sofia Huerta	(United States) Danielle Colaprico	(United States) Katie Naughton		
Brisbane Roar	(Denmark) Nina Frausing-Pedersen	(United States) Maddy Evans				
Canberra United	(Japan) Yukari Kinga	(United States) Celeste Boureille	(United States) Stephanie Ochs	(United States) Jasmyne Spencer		
Melbourne City	(United States) Lauren Barnes	(United States) Erika Tymrak	(United States) Beverly Yanez	(Wales) Jess Fishlock	(New Zealand) Rebekah Stott^{A}	
Melbourne Victory	(England) Natasha Dowie	(Mexico) Bianca Henninger	(United States) Samantha Johnson	(United States) Christine Nairn	(Turkey) Gülcan Koca^{A}	
Newcastle Jets	(United States) Arin Gilliland	(United States) Jen Hoy	(United States) Megan Oyster	(United States) Kelsey Wys	(United States) Katelyn Rowland^{R}	
Perth Glory	(Mexico) Arianna Romero	(United States) Vanessa DiBernardo	(United States) Alyssa Mautz	(United States) Nikki Stanton		
Sydney FC	(Nigeria) Francisca Ordega					
Western Sydney Wanderers	(United States) Alex Arlitt	(United States) Kendall Fletcher	(United States) Paige Nielsen	(United States) Katie Stengel		

The following do not fill a Visa position:
^{A} Australian citizens who have chosen to represent another national team;
^{R} Injury Replacement Players, or National Team Replacement Players;

== Regular season ==
The regular season commenced on 5 November 2016 and concluded on 29 January 2017.

=== League table ===
Pos	Team	Pld	W	D	L	GF	GA	GD	Pts	Qualification
1	Canberra United	12	7	2	3	33	21	+12	23	Qualification to Finals series
2	Perth Glory	12	7	2	3	22	18	+4	23	Qualification to Finals series
3	Sydney FC	12	7	1	4	22	16	+6	22	Qualification to Finals series
4	Melbourne City (C)	12	6	2	4	19	14	+5	20	Qualification to Finals series
5	Newcastle Jets	12	4	3	5	18	18	0	15	
6	Adelaide United	12	3	5	4	31	26	+5	14	
7	Brisbane Roar	12	4	1	7	15	21	−6	13	
8	Western Sydney Wanderers	12	4	1	7	14	29	−15	13	
9	Melbourne Victory	12	2	3	7	17	28	−11	9	

Source: A-Leagues
Rules for classification: 1) points; 2) goal difference; 3) number of goals scored.
(C) Champions

=== Fixtures ===
Home \ Away	ADE	BRI	CBR	MCY	MVC	NEW	PER	SYD	WSW
Adelaide United			2–2		3–3	2–2	1–4	5–2	10–2
Brisbane Roar	3–2		0–1	1–2	1–4			2–1	3–0
Canberra United	2–2	5–1		1–2	5–1	5–2	7–2		
Melbourne City	1–1	3–1	1–2		3–0	1–0	2–3		
Melbourne Victory			1–2	2–0		0–4	0–2	1–2	2–2
Newcastle Jets		2–1		0–2	1–1		1–0	1–2	1–2
Perth Glory	1–2	0–0			3–2	1–1		1–0	4–2
Sydney FC	2–0	1–0	6–1	1–1		1–3			2–0
Western Sydney Wanderers	2–1	0–2	1–0	2–1			0–1	1–2	

Legend: Blue = home team win; Yellow = draw; Red = away team win.
For upcoming matches, an "a" indicates there is an article about the rivalry between the two participants.

== Finals series ==
Semi-finals
1	Canberra United	0
4	Melbourne City (a.e.t.)	1
2	Perth Glory	5
3	Sydney FC	1

Grand Final
2	Perth Glory	0
4	Melbourne City	2

=== Semi-finals ===
4 February 2017	Perth Glory	5–1	Sydney FC	Perth
15:30 AWST	DiBernardo 29' (pen.), 77'; Kennedy 58' (o.g.); Sutton 79'; Billam 90+3'	Report	Simon 23'	Stadium: nib Stadium; Attendance: 1,592; Referee: Casey Reibelt

5 February 2017	Canberra United	0–1 (a.e.t.)	Melbourne City	Canberra
20:00 AEDT		Report	Fishlock 107'	Stadium: GIO Stadium; Attendance: 5,072; Referee: Rebecca Durcau

=== Grand final ===
12 February 2017	Perth Glory	0–2	Melbourne City	Perth
16:30 AWST		Report	Fishlock 45+1'; Yanez 72'	Stadium: nib Stadium; Attendance: 4,591; Referee: Kate Jacewicz

== Regular-season statistics ==
=== Top scorers ===
As of 29 January 2017

Rank	Player	Club	Goals
1	(Australia) Ashleigh Sykes	Canberra United	12
2	(Australia) Sam Kerr	Perth Glory	10
3	(England) Natasha Dowie	Melbourne Victory	9
3	(Australia) Adriana Jones	Adelaide United	9
5	(Mexico) Sofia Huerta	Adelaide United	8
6	(Wales) Jess Fishlock	Melbourne City	6
6	(Australia) Remy Siemsen	Sydney FC	6
6	(United States) Katie Stengel	Western Sydney Wanderers	6
6	(Australia) Rosie Sutton	Perth Glory	6
10	(Australia) Tameka Butt	Brisbane Roar	5
10	(United States) Jen Hoy	Newcastle Jets	5
10	(Australia) Jenna Kingsley	Newcastle Jets	5

=== Own goals ===
Player		Team	Against	Round
(Australia)	Emily Hodgson	Adelaide United	Sydney FC	4
(Australia)	Ellie Brush	Canberra United	Adelaide United	5
(Australia)	Angelique Hristodoulou	Western Sydney Wanderers	Melbourne Victory	6
(Australia)	Jada Mathyssen-Whyman	Western Sydney Wanderers	Brisbane Roar	11
(United States)	Alyssa Mautz	Perth Glory	Melbourne Victory	11
(Mexico)	Arianna Romero	Perth Glory	Melbourne Victory	11
(Australia)	Summer O'Brien	Brisbane Roar	Newcastle Jets	12

=== Attendances ===
Team	Home average
Newcastle Jets	2,650
Brisbane Roar	2,478
Sydney FC	1,557
Adelaide United	1,410
Canberra United	1,285
Melbourne City	1,045
Western Sydney Wanderers	996
Perth Glory	807
Melbourne Victory	596

== End-of-season awards ==
The following end of the season awards were announced at the 2016–17 Dolan Warren Awards night held at the Star Event Centre in Sydney on 1 May 2017.

- Julie Dolan Medal – Sam Kerr (Perth Glory)
- Penny Tanner Media MVP Award – Sam Kerr (Perth Glory)
- Young Player of the Year – Remy Siemsen (Sydney FC)
- Golden Boot Award – Ashleigh Sykes (Canberra United) (12 goals)
- Goalkeeper of the Year – Lydia Williams (Melbourne City)
- Coach of the Year – Bobby Despotovski (Perth Glory)
- Fair Play Award – Adelaide United
- Referee of the Year – Kate Jacewicz
- Goal of the Year – Sam Kerr (Perth Glory v Sydney FC, 11 December 2016)

== See also ==
- 2016–17 Adelaide United W-League season
- 2016–17 Brisbane Roar W-League season
- 2016–17 Canberra United W-League season
- 2016–17 Melbourne Victory W-League season
- 2016–17 Melbourne City W-League season
- 2016–17 Newcastle Jets W-League season
- 2016–17 Perth Glory W-League season
- 2016–17 Sydney FC W-League season
- 2016–17 Western Sydney Wanderers W-League season
