= 2016–17 Adelaide United FC (women) season =

Adelaide United W-League
2016–17 season
- Manager: Mark Jones
- Stadium: Elite Systems Football Centre, Adelaide; Coopers Stadium, Adelaide
- W-League: 6th
- W-League finals series: DNQ
- Top goalscorer: Adriana Jones (9 goals)
- Highest home attendance: 2,334 vs Sydney FC (29 January 2017)
- Lowest home attendance: 573 vs Canberra United (3 December 2016)
- Average home league attendance: 1,410
Home colours	Away colours	Third colours

The 2016–17 Adelaide United W-League season was the club's ninth season in the W-League, the premier competition for women's football in Australia.

== Players ==
=== Squad information ===
Adelaide United's women squad for the 2016–17 W-League, updated 23 November 2017

Note: Flags indicate national team as defined under FIFA eligibility rules; some limited exceptions apply. Players may hold more than one non-FIFA nationality.

No.	Pos.	Nation	Player
1	GK	AUS	Eliza Campbell
2	MF	AUS	Cheyenne Hammond
3	MF	AUS	Georgia Iannella
4	DF	AUS	Emily Hodgson
5	DF	BRA	Mônica (on loan from Orlando Pride)
6	MF	AUS	Ally Ladas
7	FW	AUS	Stella Rigon (on loan from Fulham United FC, Captain)
8	MF	AUS	Emily Condon
9	FW	AUS	Marijana Rajcic
10	FW	AUS	Racheal Quigley
11	FW	MEX	Sofia Huerta (on loan from Chicago Red Stars)

No.	Pos.	Nation	Player
12	FW	AUS	Adriana Jones
13	DF	AUS	Lucy Adamopoulos
14	DF	AUS	Grace Abbey
15	MF	AUS	Georgia Campagnale
16	MF	AUS	Kelsey Zafiridis
17	FW	AUS	Dragana Kljajic
18	MF	AUS	Isabella Scalzi
20	GK	AUS	Sarah Willacy
21	GK	AUS	Claudia Jenkins
24	MF	USA	Danielle Colaprico (on loan from Chicago Red Stars)
25	DF	USA	Katie Naughton (on loan from Chicago Red Stars)
30	MF	AUS	Alex Chidiac

=== Transfers in ===
No.	Pos.	Nat.	Name	Age	Moving from	Type	Transfer window	Ends	Transfer fee	Source
30	MF	(Australia)	Alex Chidiac	17	Melbourne City	Transfer	Pre-season		Free	
10	FW	(Australia)	Rachael Quigley	25	(South Korea) Hwacheon KSPO	Transfer	Pre-season		Free	
5	DF	(Brazil)	Mônica	29	(United States) Orlando Pride	Loan	Pre-season	2017		
24	MF	(United States)	Danielle Colaprico	23	(United States) Chicago Red Stars	Loan	Pre-season			
11	MF	(Mexico)	Sofia Huerta	23	(United States) Chicago Red Stars	Loan	Pre-season	2017		
25	DF	(United States)	Katie Naughton	22	(United States) Chicago Red Stars	Loan	Pre-season			
13	DF	(Australia)	Lucy Adamopoulos	23	(Australia) West Adelaide	Transfer	Pre-season		Free	
1	GK	(Australia)	Eliza Campbell	21	(Norway) Klepp	Transfer	Pre-season		Free	
2	MF	(Australia)	Cheyenne Hammond	18	(Australia) Sturt Marion	Transfer	Pre-season		Free	
4	DF	(Australia)	Emily Hodgson	16	(Australia) Cumberland United	Transfer	Pre-season		Free	
21	GK	(Australia)	Claudia Jenkins	18	(Australia) Fulham United	Transfer	Pre-season		Free	
12	FW	(Australia)	Adriana Jones	21	Newcastle Jets	Transfer	Pre-season		Free	
17	FW	(Australia)	Dragana Kljajic	20	(Australia) Adelaide City	Transfer	Pre-season		Free	
6	MF	(Australia)	Ally Ladas	19	(Australia) Adelaide City	Transfer	Pre-season		Free	
7	FW	(Australia)	Stella Rigon	27	(Australia) Fulham United	Transfer	Pre-season	2017	Free	
18	MF	(Australia)	Isabella Scalzi	22	(Australia) Adelaide City	Transfer	Pre-season		Free	
20	GK	(Australia)	Sarah Willacy	21	(Australia) Adelaide City	Transfer	Pre-season		Free	
16	MF	(Australia)	Kelsey Zafiridis	18	(Australia) Campbelltown City	Transfer	Pre-season		Free	

=== Transfers out ===
No.	Pos.	Nat.	Name	Age	Moving to	Type	Transfer window	Transfer fee	Source
11	FW	(Australia)	Rosie Sutton	26	Perth Glory	Transfer	Pre-season	Free	

=== Contract extensions ===
No.	Name	Duration	Position	Date	Notes

== Managerial staff ==
Position	Name
Head coach	(Australia) Mark Jones
Team manager	
Assistant coach	

== Statistics ==
=== Squad statistics ===
N	Pos.	Nat.	Name	Total					W-League
N	Pos.	Nat.	Name	Apps	Goals	Yellow card	Second yellow card	Red card	Apps	Goals	Yellow card	Second yellow card	Red card
1	GK	(Australia)	Eliza Campbell	7	0	1	0	0	7+0	0	1	0	0
2	MF	(Australia)	Cheyenne Hammond	1	0	0	0	0	0+1	0	0	0	0
3	MF	(Australia)	Georgia Iannella	4	0	0	0	0	1+3	0	0	0	0
4	DF	(Australia)	Emily Hodgson	12	1	0	0	0	9+3	1	0	0	0
5	DF	(Brazil)	Mônica	9	1	0	0	0	9+0	1	0	0	0
6	MF	(Australia)	Ally Ladas	9	1	1	0	0	2+7	1	1	0	0
7	FW	(Australia)	Stella Rigon	9	1	0	0	0	9+0	1	0	0	0
8	MF	(Australia)	Emily Condon	0	0	0	0	0	0+0	0	0	0	0
9	FW	(Australia)	Marijana Rajcic	3	0	0	0	0	2+1	0	0	0	0
10	FW	(Australia)	Rachael Quigley	8	5	0	0	0	7+1	5	0	0	0
11	MF	(United States)	Sofia Huerta	12	8	0	0	0	12+0	8	0	0	0
12	FW	(Australia)	Adriana Jones	11	9	0	0	0	11+0	9	0	0	0
13	DF	(Australia)	Lucy Adamopoulos	2	0	1	0	0	0+2	0	1	0	0
14	DF	(Australia)	Grace Abbey	9	0	1	0	0	9+0	0	1	0	0
15	MF	(Australia)	Georgia Campagnale	12	0	1	0	0	12+0	0	1	0	0
16	MF	(Australia)	Katelyn Tucker	0	0	0	0	0	0+0	0	0	0	0
17	FW	(Australia)	Nicole Calder	0	0	0	0	0	0+0	0	0	0	0
18	MF	(Australia)	Isabella Scalzi	0	0	0	0	0	0+0	0	0	0	0
20	GK	(Australia)	Sarah Willacy	5	0	0	0	0	5+0	0	0	0	0
24	MF	(United States)	Danielle Colaprico	12	2	1	0	0	12+0	2	1	0	0
25	DF	(United States)	Katie Naughton	12	0	1	0	0	12+0	0	1	0	0
30	MF	(Australia)	Alex Chidiac	8	2	0	0	0	7+1	2	0	0	0

- (yellow card) = Number of bookings; (second yellow card) = Number of sending offs after a second yellow card; (red card) = Number of sending offs by a direct red card.

== Competitions ==
=== W-League ===
==== League table ====
Pos	Team	Pld	W	D	L	GF	GA	GD	Pts	Qualification
1	Canberra United	12	7	2	3	33	21	+12	23	Qualification to Finals series
2	Perth Glory	12	7	2	3	22	18	+4	23	Qualification to Finals series
3	Sydney FC	12	7	1	4	22	16	+6	22	Qualification to Finals series
4	Melbourne City (C)	12	6	2	4	19	14	+5	20	Qualification to Finals series
5	Newcastle Jets	12	4	3	5	18	18	0	15	
6	Adelaide United	12	3	5	4	31	26	+5	14	
7	Brisbane Roar	12	4	1	7	15	21	−6	13	
8	Western Sydney Wanderers	12	4	1	7	14	29	−15	13	
9	Melbourne Victory	12	2	3	7	17	28	−11	9	

Source: A-Leagues
Rules for classification: 1) points; 2) goal difference; 3) number of goals scored.
(C) Champions

==== Results summary ====
Overall								Home						Away					
Pld	W	D	L	GF	GA	GD	Pts	W	D	L	GF	GA	GD	W	D	L	GF	GA	GD
12	3	5	4	31	26	+5	14	2	3	1	23	15	+8	1	2	3	8	11	−3

Source: Competitive Matches

==== Results by round ====
Round	1	2	3	4	5	6	7	8	9	10	11	12	13	14
Ground	H	B	A	A	H	A	H	B	H	A	A	H	A	H
Result	D	✖	L	L	D	L	L	✖	D	D	D	W	W	W
Position	4	6	8	8	8	8	9	9	9	9	9	9	8	6

Source: Competitive Matches
A = Away; H = Home; B = Bye; W = Win; D = Draw; L = Loss

==== Matches ====
6 November 2016 1	Adelaide United	3–3	Melbourne Victory	Adelaide
14:30 AEST	Rigon 13'; Jones 20'; Mônica 74'	Report	Dowie 16', 63'; Kuralay 81'	Stadium: Coopers Stadium; Attendance: 2,013; Referee: Katie Patterson

20 November 2016 3	Western Sydney Wanderers	2–1	Adelaide United	Sydney
15:00 AEDT	Stengel 60'; Nielsen 85'	Report	Jones 62'	Stadium: Marconi Stadium; Attendance: 457; Referee: Kelly Jones

27 November 2016 4	Sydney FC	2–0	Adelaide United	Sydney
17:00 AEDT	Siemsen 42'; Hodgson 84' (o.g.)	Report		Stadium: Seymour Shaw; Attendance: 1,535; Referee: Rachel Mitchenson

3 December 2016 5	Adelaide United	2–2	Canberra United	Adelaide
19:30 AEDT	Quigley 32'; Brush 54' (o.g.)	Report	Brush 25' (pen.); Raso 82'	Stadium: Elite Systems Football Centre; Attendance: 573; Referee: Lara Lee

11 December 2016 6	Brisbane Roar	3–2	Adelaide United	Brisbane
14:30 AEST	Gorry 4'; Butt 12'; Toby 49'	Report	Jones 59'; Huerta 74' (pen.)	Stadium: Suncorp Stadium; Attendance: 4,515; Referee: Casey Reibelt

17 December 2016 7	Adelaide United	1–4	Perth Glory	Adelaide
20:00 AEST	Huerta 65'	Report	Kerr 35', 67'; Sutton 62'; DiBernardo 82' (pen.)	Stadium: Elite Systems Football Centre; Attendance: 705; Referee: Katie Patterson

29 December 2016 9	Adelaide United	2–2	Newcastle Jets	Adelaide
19:30 AEST	Jones 14'; Chidiac 47'	Report	Kingsley 22', 52' (pen.)	Stadium: Elite Systems Football Centre; Attendance: 711; Referee: Kate Jacewicz

2 January 2017 10	Melbourne City	1–1	Adelaide United	Melbourne
19:15 AEDT	Fishlock 26'	Report	Quigley 70'	Stadium: CB Smith Reserve; Attendance: 674; Referee: Kelly Jones

7 January 2017 11	Canberra United	2–2	Adelaide United	Canberra
18:00 AEDT	Sykes 20', 79'	Report	Huerta 65' (pen.), 81'	Stadium: McKellar Park; Attendance: 1,152; Referee: Casey Reibelt

14 January 2017 12	Adelaide United	10–2	Western Sydney Wanderers	Adelaide
19:30 ACDT	Quigley 19', 69'; Jones 29' (pen.), 65', 83'; Huerta 49', 78', 79'; Chidiac 75'; Ladas 89'	Report	Willacy 17' (o.g.); Halloway 59'	Stadium: Elite Systems Football Centre; Attendance: 876; Referee: Rebecca Durcau

22 January 2017 13	Perth Glory	1–2	Adelaide United	Perth
16:00 AWST	Sutton 10'	Report	Colaprico 15', 84'	Stadium: Dorrien Gardens; Attendance: 637; Referee: Casey Reibelt

29 January 2017 14	Adelaide United	5–2	Sydney FC	Adelaide
14:30 AEST	Uzunlar 46' (o.g.); Jones 49', 68' (pen.); Hodgson 60'; Huerta 87'	Report	Siemsen 55', 58'	Stadium: Coopers Stadium; Attendance: 2,334; Referee: Rachel Mitchenson
