= 2016–17 Newcastle Jets FC (women) season =

Newcastle Jets W-League
2016–17 season
- Manager: Craig Deans
- Stadium: McDonald Jones Stadium, Newcastle
- W-League: 5th
- W-League finals series: DNQ
- Top goalscorer: League: Jenna Kingsley and Jen Hoy (5 goals); All: Jenna Kingsley and Jen Hoy (5 goals)
- Highest home attendance: 3,650 vs Perth Glory (20 November 2016)
- Lowest home attendance: 1,740 vs Melbourne Victory (16 December 2016)
- Average home league attendance: 2,650
Home colours	Away colours	Third colours

== Players ==
=== Transfers in ===
No.	Pos.	Nat.	Name	Age	Moving from	Type	Transfer window	Ends	Transfer fee	Source
16	MF	(Australia)	Liana Danaskos		(Australia) Sydney University	Transfer	Pre-season		Free	
3	MF	(Australia)	Elizabeth O'Reilly		(Australia) Sydney University	Transfer	Pre-season		Free	
12	FW	(Australia)	Tara Pender		(Australia) Blacktown Spartans	Transfer	Pre-season		Free	
8	FW	(Australia)	Emma Stanbury		(Australia) Sydney University	Transfer	Pre-season		Free	
9	FW	(United States)	Jen Hoy		(United States) Chicago Red Stars	Loan	Pre-season		Free	
5	DF	(United States)	Arin Gilliland		(United States) Chicago Red Stars	Loan	Pre-season		Free	
1	GK	(United States)	Kelsey Wys		(United States) Washington Spirit	Loan	Pre-season	2017	Free	
19	DF	(Australia)	Josie Dinh-Urena	16	(Australia) Charlestown Azzurri	Injury Replacement	Mid-season	2017	Free	

=== Contract extensions ===
No.	Name	Duration	Date	Notes

== Managerial staff ==
Position	Name
Head coach	
Team manager	
Assistant coach	

== Squad statistics ==
N	Pos.	Nat.	Name	Total					W-League
N	Pos.	Nat.	Name	Apps	Goals	Yellow card	Second yellow card	Red card	Apps	Goals	Yellow card	Second yellow card	Red card
1	GK	(United States)	Kelsey Wys	3	0	0	0	0	3+0	0	0	0	0
2	DF	(Australia)	Sophie Nenadovic	10	0	2	0	0	7+3	0	2	0	0
3	MF	(Australia)	Elizabeth O'Reilly	4	0	1	0	0	4+0	0	1	0	0
4	DF	(United States)	Megan Oyster	12	1	2	0	0	12+0	1	2	0	0
5	DF	(United States)	Arin Gilliland	9	4	0	0	0	9+0	4	0	0	0
6	MF	(Australia)	Cassidy Davis	12	0	1	0	0	12+0	0	1	0	0
7	MF	(Australia)	Gena Simon	12	0	1	0	0	12+0	0	1	0	0
8	FW	(Australia)	Emma Stanbury	6	1	0	0	0	6+0	1	0	0	0
9	FW	(United States)	Jen Hoy	12	5	0	0	0	12+0	5	0	0	0
10	FW	(Australia)	Rhali Dobson	11	1	0	0	0	3+8	1	0	0	0
11	FW	(Australia)	Ashlee Brodigan	11	0	0	0	0	4+7	0	0	0	0
12	FW	(Australia)	Tara Pender	4	0	1	0	0	2+2	0	1	0	0
13	MF	(Australia)	Grace McIntyre	11	0	2	0	0	7+4	0	2	0	0
14	MF	(Australia)	Brooke Miller	3	0	1	0	0	1+2	0	1	0	0
15	MF	(Australia)	Libby Copus-Brown	6	0	0	0	0	3+3	0	0	0	0
16	MF	(Australia)	Liana Danaskos	7	0	0	0	0	4+3	0	0	0	0
17	MF	(Australia)	Jenna Kingsley	12	5	0	0	0	12+0	5	0	0	0
18	DF	(Australia)	Clare Wheeler	11	0	1	0	0	10+1	0	1	0	0
19	DF	(Australia)	Josie Dinh-Urena	0	0	0	0	0	0+0	0	0	0	0
20	GK	(Australia)	Claire Coelho	2	0	0	0	0	1+1	0	0	0	0
30	GK	(United States)	Katelyn Rowland	8	0	0	0	0	8+0	0	0	0	0
40	GK	(Australia)	Annalee Grove	0	0	0	0	0	0+0	0	0	0	0

- Source: au.women.soccerway.com
- (yellow card) = Number of bookings; (second yellow card) = Number of sending offs after a second yellow card; (red card) = Number of sending offs by a direct red card.

== Competitions ==
=== W-League ===
==== League table ====
Pos	Team	Pld	W	D	L	GF	GA	GD	Pts	Qualification
1	Canberra United	12	7	2	3	33	21	+12	23	Qualification to Finals series
2	Perth Glory	12	7	2	3	22	18	+4	23	Qualification to Finals series
3	Sydney FC	12	7	1	4	22	16	+6	22	Qualification to Finals series
4	Melbourne City (C)	12	6	2	4	19	14	+5	20	Qualification to Finals series
5	Newcastle Jets	12	4	3	5	18	18	0	15	
6	Adelaide United	12	3	5	4	31	26	+5	14	
7	Brisbane Roar	12	4	1	7	15	21	−6	13	
8	Western Sydney Wanderers	12	4	1	7	14	29	−15	13	
9	Melbourne Victory	12	2	3	7	17	28	−11	9	

Source: A-Leagues
Rules for classification: 1) points; 2) goal difference; 3) number of goals scored.
(C) Champions

==== Results summary ====
Overall								Home						Away					
Pld	W	D	L	GF	GA	GD	Pts	W	D	L	GF	GA	GD	W	D	L	GF	GA	GD
12	4	3	5	18	18	0	15	2	1	3	6	8	−2	2	2	2	12	10	+2

Last updated: 1 December 2017.
Source: Competitive Matches

==== Results by round ====
Round	1	2	3	4	5	6	7	8	9	10	11	12	13	14
Ground	A	A	H	A	H	B	H	H	A	A	B	H	A	H
Result	L	W	W	L	L	✖	D	L	D	D	✖	W	W	L
Position	8	4	1	5	6	6	6	7	7	7	7	6	5	5

Updated to match(es) played on 1 December 2017. Source: Competitive Matches
A = Away; H = Home; B = Bye; W = Win; D = Draw; L = Loss

==== Matches ====
6 November 2016 1	Melbourne City	1–0	Newcastle Jets	Melbourne
15:00 AEDT	Tabain 7'	Report		Stadium: CB Smith Reserve; Attendance: 633; Referee: Kate Jacewicz

13 November 2016 2	Melbourne Victory	0–4	Newcastle Jets	Melbourne
16:00 AEDT			Oyster 7'; Gilliland 14'; Stanbury 23'; Kingsley 90+1'	Stadium: Lakeside Stadium; Attendance: 270; Referee: Rachel Mitchenson

20 November 2016 3	Newcastle Jets	1–0	Perth Glory	Newcastle
14:30 AEDT	Hoy 48' (pen.)	Report		Stadium: McDonald Jones Stadium; Attendance: 3,650; Referee: Lara Lee

26 November 2016 4	Canberra United	5–2	Newcastle Jets	Canberra
16:00 AEDT	Heyman 19', 53'; Ochs 33'; Maher 65'; Flannery 90+2'	Report	Dobson 63'; Hoy 88'	Stadium: McKellar Park; Attendance: 871; Referee: Kate Jacewicz

4 December 2016 5	Newcastle Jets	1–2	Sydney FC	Newcastle
14:30 AEDT	Hoy 46'	Report	K. Simon 17' (pen.); Bolger 48'	Stadium: McDonald Jones Stadium; Attendance: 2,525; Referee: Kelly Jones

16 December 2016 7	Newcastle Jets	1–1	Melbourne Victory	Newcastle
17:20 AEDT	Hoy 84'	Report	Dowie 18'	Stadium: McDonald Jones Stadium; Attendance: 1,740; Referee: Rachel Mitchenson

26 December 2016 8	Newcastle Jets	1–2	Western Sydney Wanderers	Newcastle
15:05 AEDT	Kingsley 8'	Report	Stengel 12', 30'	Stadium: McDonald Jones Stadium; Attendance: 2,268; Referee: Lara Lee

29 December 2016 9	Adelaide United	2–2	Newcastle Jets	Adelaide
19:30 ACDT	Jones 14'; Chidiac 46'	Report	Kingsley 22', 52' (pen.)	Stadium: Elite Systems Football Centre; Attendance: 711; Referee: Kate Jacewicz

2 January 2017 10	Perth Glory	1–1	Newcastle Jets	Perth
16:00 AWST	Kerr 69'	Report	Kingsley 46'	Stadium: Dorrien Gardens; Attendance: 477; Referee: Rachel Mitchenson

15 January 2017 12	Newcastle Jets	2–1	Brisbane Roar	Newcastle
14:30 AEDT	O'Brien 9' (o.g.); Hoy 90+2'	Report	Butt 45' (pen.)	Stadium: McDonald Jones Stadium; Attendance: 2,146; Referee: Casey Reibelt

21 January 2017 13	Sydney FC	1–3	Newcastle Jets	Sydney
17:00 AEDT	K. Simon 90+3'	Report	Gilliland 57', 74', 78'	Stadium: Lambert Park; Attendance: 1,029; Referee: Rebecca Durcau

27 January 2017 14	Newcastle Jets	0–2	Melbourne City	Coffs Harbour
17:20 AEDT		Report	Tymrak 56'; Jackson 90+3'	Stadium: C.ex Coffs International Stadium; Attendance: 3,570; Referee: Kate Jacewicz
