= 2016–17 Melbourne Victory FC (women) season =

Melbourne Victory W-League
2016–17 season
- Manager: Jeff Hopkins
- Stadium: Lakeside Stadium, Melbourne; Epping Stadium, Melbourne; AAMI Park, Melbourne
- W-League: 9th
- W-League finals series: DNQ
- Top goalscorer: League: Natasha Dowie (9 goals); All: Natasha Dowie (9 goals)
- Highest home attendance: 1,963 vs Canberra United (28 December 2016)
- Lowest home attendance: 264 vs Perth Glory (4 December 2016)
- Average home league attendance: 596
Home colours	Away colours

The 2016–17 Melbourne Victory W-League season was the club's ninth season in the W-League, the premier competition for women's football in Australia.

== Players ==
=== Squad information ===
Melbourne Victory's women squad for the 2016–17 W-League.

Note: Flags indicate national team as defined under FIFA eligibility rules; some limited exceptions apply. Players may hold more than one non-FIFA nationality.

No.	Pos.	Nation	Player
1	GK	MEX	Bianca Henninger
2	DF	AUS	Alex Natoli
3	DF	AUS	Alex Cheal
4	MF	AUS	Melissa Taranto
6	DF	AUS	Annabel Martin
7	MF	AUS	Lia Privitelli
8	MF	AUS	Ayesha Norrie
9	FW	ENG	Natasha Dowie
10	MF	USA	Christine Nairn
11	MF	AUS	MelindaJ Barbieri

No.	Pos.	Nation	Player
13	FW	AUS	Laura Spiranovic
14	MF	AUS	Selin Kuralay
15	MF	AUS	Adriana Taranto
16	DF	USA	Samantha Johnson
17	DF	AUS	Gülcan Koca
19	FW	AUS	Rachel Alonso
20	GK	AUS	Bethany Mason-Jones
24	MF	AUS	Kirsty Yallop
25	FW	AUS	Kariah White
30	GK	AUS	Emily Kenshole

=== Transfers in ===
No.	Pos.	Nat.	Name	Age	Moving from	Type	Transfer window	Ends	Transfer fee	Source
19	FW	(Australia)	Rachel Alonso		(Australia) Calder United	Transfer	Pre-season		Free	
3	DF	(Australia)	Alex Cheal		(Australia) South Melbourne	Transfer	Pre-season		Free	
7	MF	(Australia)	Lia Privitelli		(Australia) Bulleen Lions	Transfer	Pre-season		Free	
8	MF	(Australia)	Ayesha Norrie		Brisbane Roar	Transfer	Pre-season	2017	Free	

=== Transfers out ===
No.	Pos.	Nat.	Name	Age	Moving to	Type	Transfer window	Transfer fee	Source

=== Contract extensions ===
No.	Name	Position	Duration	Date	Notes

== Managerial staff ==
Position	Name
Head coach	
Assistant coach	
Team manager	

== Statistics ==
=== Squad statistics ===
N	Pos.	Nat.	Name	Total					W-League
N	Pos.	Nat.	Name	Apps	Goals	Yellow card	Second yellow card	Red card	Apps	Goals	Yellow card	Second yellow card	Red card
1	GK	(Mexico)	Bianca Henninger	7	0	0	0	0	7+0	0	0	0	0
2	DF	(Australia)	Alex Natoli	12	0	1	0	0	12+0	0	1	0	0
3	DF	(Australia)	Alex Cheal	7	0	1	0	0	7+0	0	1	0	0
4	DF	(Australia)	Melissa Taranto	1	0	0	0	0	1+0	0	0	0	0
5	DF	(Australia)	Alexandra Gummer	7	0	1	0	0	5+2	0	1	0	0
6	DF	(Australia)	Annabel Martin	11	0	2	0	0	11+0	0	2	0	0
7	MF	(Australia)	Lia Privitelli	11	0	0	0	0	6+5	0	0	0	0
8	MF	(Australia)	Ayesha Norrie	9	0	1	0	0	4+5	0	1	0	0
9	FW	(England)	Natasha Dowie	12	9	2	0	0	12+0	9	2	0	0
10	MF	(United States)	Christine Nairn	12	2	0	0	0	12+0	2	0	0	0
11	MF	(Australia)	MelindaJ Barbieri	11	0	0	0	0	5+6	0	0	0	0
13	FW	(Australia)	Laura Spiranovic	11	1	0	0	0	7+4	1	0	0	0
14	MF	(Australia)	Selin Kuralay	1	1	1	0	0	0+1	1	1	0	0
15	MF	(Australia)	Adriana Taranto	10	0	0	0	0	7+3	0	0	0	0
16	DF	(United States)	Samantha Johnson	11	0	5	0	0	11+0	0	5	0	0
17	DF	(Australia)	Gülcan Koca	10	0	1	0	0	8+2	0	1	0	0
19	FW	(Australia)	Rachel Alonso	4	0	0	0	0	2+2	0	0	0	0
20	GK	(Australia)	Bethany Mason-Jones	6	0	0	0	0	5+1	0	0	0	0
24	MF	(Australia)	Kirsty Yallop	3	0	0	0	0	3+0	0	0	0	0
25	FW	(Australia)	Kariah White	9	1	0	0	0	7+2	1	0	0	0
30	GK	(Australia)	Emily Kenshole	0	0	0	0	0	0+0	0	0	0	0

- Last updated: 10 January 2018
- (yellow card) = Number of bookings; (second yellow card) = Number of sending offs after a second yellow card; (red card) = Number of sending offs by a direct red card.

== Competitions ==
=== W-League ===
==== League table ====
Pos	Team	Pld	W	D	L	GF	GA	GD	Pts	Qualification
1	Canberra United	12	7	2	3	33	21	+12	23	Qualification to Finals series
2	Perth Glory	12	7	2	3	22	18	+4	23	Qualification to Finals series
3	Sydney FC	12	7	1	4	22	16	+6	22	Qualification to Finals series
4	Melbourne City (C)	12	6	2	4	19	14	+5	20	Qualification to Finals series
5	Newcastle Jets	12	4	3	5	18	18	0	15	
6	Adelaide United	12	3	5	4	31	26	+5	14	
7	Brisbane Roar	12	4	1	7	15	21	−6	13	
8	Western Sydney Wanderers	12	4	1	7	14	29	−15	13	
9	Melbourne Victory	12	2	3	7	17	28	−11	9	

Source: A-Leagues
Rules for classification: 1) points; 2) goal difference; 3) number of goals scored.
(C) Champions

==== Results summary ====
Overall								Home						Away					
Pld	W	D	L	GF	GA	GD	Pts	W	D	L	GF	GA	GD	W	D	L	GF	GA	GD
12	2	3	7	17	28	−11	9	1	1	4	6	12	−6	1	2	3	11	16	−5

Last updated: 1 December 2017.
Source: Competitive Matches

==== Results by round ====
Round	1	2	3	4	5	6	7	8	9	10	11	12	13	14
Ground	A	H	H	H	H	H	A	B	H	A	A	H	B	A
Result	D	L	L	L	L	D	D	✖	L	W	L	W	✖	L
Position	4	7	9	9	9	9	8	8	8	8	8	8	9	9

Updated to match(es) played on 26 November 2017. Source: Competitive Matches
A = Away; H = Home; B = Bye; W = Win; D = Draw; L = Loss

==== Matches ====
6 November 2016 1	Adelaide United	3–3	Melbourne Victory	Adelaide
14:00 ACDT	Rigon 13'; Jones 20'; Mônica 74'	Report	Dowie 16', 63'; Kuralay 81'	Stadium: Coopers Stadium; Attendance: 2,013; Referee: Katie Patterson

13 November 2016 2	Melbourne Victory	0–4	Newcastle Jets	Melbourne
16:00 AEDT			Oyster 7'; Gilliland 14'; Stanbury 23'; Kingsley 90+1'	Stadium: Lakeside Stadium; Attendance: 270; Referee: Rachel Mitchenson

20 November 2016 3	Melbourne Victory	1–2	Sydney FC	Melbourne
16:00 AEDT	Dowie 83'	Report	Kennedy 17'; Siemsen 35'	Stadium: Lakeside Stadium; Attendance: 339; Referee: Rebecca Durcau

27 November 2016 4	Melbourne City	3–0	Melbourne Victory	Melbourne
14:30 AEDT	Fishlock 64', 77'; Catley 75'	Report		Stadium: AAMI Park; Attendance: 1,943; Referee: Katie Patterson

4 December 2016 5	Melbourne Victory	0–2	Perth Glory	Melbourne
16:00 AEDT		Report	Sutton 17'; DiBernardo 64'	Stadium: Lakeside Stadium; Attendance: 264; Referee: Rebecca Durcau

11 December 2016 6	Melbourne Victory	2–2	Western Sydney Wanderers	Melbourne
16:00 AEDT	Hristodoulou 2' (o.g.); White 84'	Report	Yatim 61'; Stengel 90+1'	Stadium: Lakeside Stadium; Attendance: 273; Referee: Kate Jacewicz

16 December 2016 7	Newcastle Jets	1–1	Melbourne Victory	Newcastle
17:20 AEDT	Hoy 84'	Report	Dowie 18'	Stadium: McDonald Jones Stadium; Attendance: 1,740; Referee: Rachel Mitchenson

28 December 2016 9	Melbourne Victory	1–2	Canberra United	Melbourne
17:20 AEDT	Dowie 30'	Report	Flannery 52'; Sykes 89' (pen.)	Stadium: AAMI Park; Attendance: 1,963; Referee: Rebecca Durcau

1 January 2017 10	Brisbane Roar	1–4	Melbourne Victory	Brisbane
16:00 AEST	Chapman 42'	Report	Spiranovic 18'; Dowie 45', 72', 90+3'	Stadium: A.J. Kelly Park; Attendance: 1,805; Referee: Lara Lee

8 January 2017 11	Perth Glory	3–2	Melbourne Victory	Perth
16:00 AWST	Kerr 75'; DiBernardo 80' (pen.); Sutton 85'	Report	Romero 52' (o.g.); Mautz 59' (o.g.)	Stadium: Dorrien Gardens; Attendance: 578; Referee: Kate Jacewicz

15 January 2017 12	Melbourne Victory	2–0	Melbourne City	Melbourne
16:00 AEDT	Dowie 1'; Nairn 31'	Report		Stadium: Epping Stadium; Attendance: 467; Referee: Katie Patterson

28 January 2017 14	Canberra United	5–1	Melbourne Victory	Canberra
16:00 AEDT	Sykes 40', 90+2'; Kinga 48', 90+4'; Maher 77'	Report	Nairn 49'	Stadium: McKellar Park; Attendance: 1,254; Referee: Lara Lee
