= Cheyenne Hammond =

Australian rules footballer (born 1998)

Personal information
- Born: 29 July 1998 (age 28)
- Original teams: Willunga (GSFLW); Christies Beach (Adelaide FL); South Adelaide (SANFLW)
- Draft: No. 57, 2019 AFL Women's draft
- Debut: Round 1, 2020, Gold Coast vs. Greater Western Sydney, at Blacktown International Sportspark
- Height: 170 cm (5 ft 7 in)

Club information
- Current club: Port Adelaide

Playing career^{1}
Years	Club	Games (Goals)
2020–2022 (S6)	Gold Coast	22 (1)
2022 (S7)–	Port Adelaide	18 (1)
Total		40 (2)
- ^{1} Playing statistics correct to the end of the 2023 season.

Career highlights
- 2× SANFLW premiership player (South Adelaide): 2018, 2019; SANFLW grand final best on ground medal: 2018

Cheyenne Hammond (born 29 July 1998) is an Australian rules footballer who plays for Port Adelaide in the AFL Women's competition (AFLW).

Hammond was drafted by Gold Coast with the club's fifth pick and the 57th selection overall in the 2019 AFL Women's draft.

Hammond made her debut in round 1 of the 2020 season against Greater Western Sydney at Blacktown International Sportspark.

In June 2022, Hammond was traded to Port Adelaide.

== Statistics ==
Statistics are correct to the end of the 2020 season.

Legend
G	Goals	K	Kicks	D	Disposals	T	Tackles
B	Behinds	H	Handballs	M	Marks

Season	Team	No.	Games	Totals							Averages (per game)							Votes
Season	Team	No.	Games	G	B	K	H	D	M	T	G	B	K	H	D	M	T	Votes
2020	Gold Coast	29	7	0	2	29	14	43	8	16	0.0	0.3	4.1	2.0	6.1	1.1	2.3	
Career			7	0	2	29	14	43	8	16	0.0	0.3	4.1	2.0	6.1	1.1	2.3	
