= Kelsey Wys =

American soccer player and coach

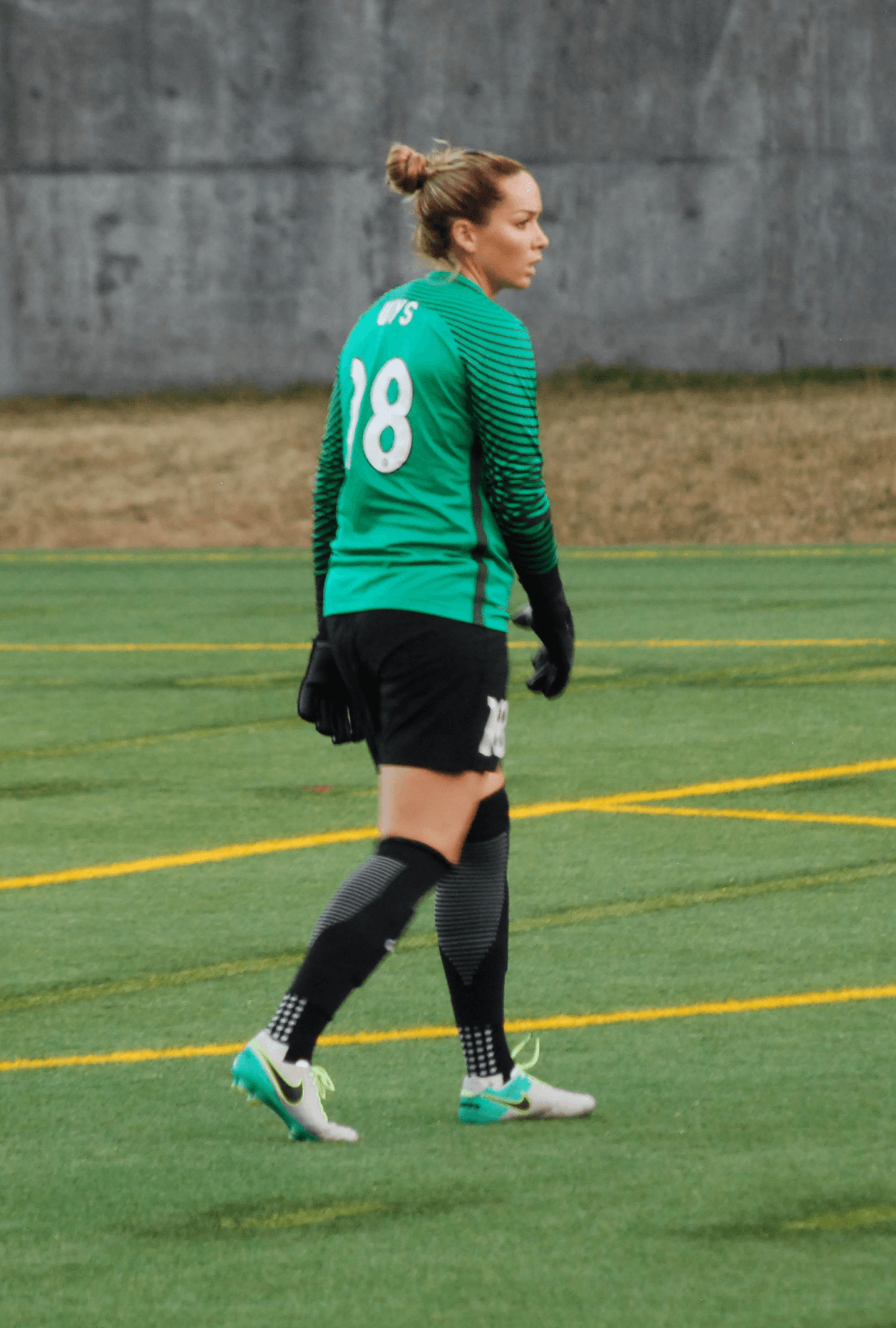
- Wys playing for the Spirit in September 2016

Personal information
- Full name: Kelsey Laine Wys
- Date of birth: February 4, 1991 (age 35)
- Place of birth: Coral Springs, Florida, U.S.
- Height: 6 ft 3 in (1.91 m)
- Position: Goalkeeper

College career
Years	Team	Apps	(Gls)
2009–2013	Florida State Seminoles		

Senior career*
Years	Team	Apps	(Gls)
2014	Western New York Flash	10	(0)
2015–2018	Washington Spirit	26	(0)
2016–2017	→ Newcastle Jets (loan)	3	(0)
2019	Selfoss	18	(0)

International career
2008	United States U17		
2010	United States U20		
2013	United States U23		

Managerial career
- 2020–2021: Appalachian State Mountaineers (assistant)
- 2022–: Missouri Tigers (assistant)
- * Club domestic league appearances and goals

Kelsey Laine Wys (born February 4, 1991) is an American soccer coach and former professional player who played as a goalkeeper. She currently serves as an assistant coach for the Missouri Tigers.

== Playing career ==
=== High School ===
Wys attended Marjory Stoneman Douglas High School and played for the Lady Eagles soccer team.

=== College ===
Wys attended Florida State University and played for the Seminoles from 2010 to 2013.

=== Club ===
==== Western New York Flash ====
In January 2014, Wys was selected by the Western New York Flash in the second round (18th selection overall) of the 2014 NWSL College Draft. She made her debut for the team on May 11, 2014, during a home match against Sky Blue FC. During the game, Wys provided a direct assist to striker Abby Wambach, a first for a goalkeeper in the league.

==== Washington Spirit ====
In 2015, Wys was traded to the Washington Spirit in exchange for goalkeeper Chantel Jones. She made her debut for the Spirit during a 3–1 defeat to Seattle Reign FC in Seattle on 2 May. Wys started in 11 games for the Spirit in 2015. The Coral Springs, Fla native tallied 35 saves and three shutouts. In 2016, Wys started 12 regular season matches and both post season matches for the Spirit.

After four seasons with the Spirit, Wys was waived ahead of the 2019 season to pursue opportunities overseas.

===== Loan to Newcastle Jets =====
In November 2016, Wys joined Australian club Newcastle Jets on a season long loan. In her 3rd match, on November 20, 2016, Wys tore her anterior cruciate ligament ruling her out for the rest of the season.

==== UMF Selfoss ====
In April 2019, Wys joined UMF Selfoss of the Icelandic Úrvalsdeild kvenna. On 17 August 2019, she helped Selfoss defeat KR, 2–1, in the Icelandic Cup finals, securing the club's first major trophy.

== Coaching career ==
=== Appalachian State ===
In February 2020, Wys was announced as an assistant coach for the women's soccer team at Appalachian State University.

In February 2022, Wys was announced as goalkeeper coach at the University of Missouri.

== Personal ==
Wys currently resides in Columbia, Missouri. Wys reportedly spends her time off the pitch managing a grade V bilateral quad strain.
