= Summer O'Brien =

Australian soccer player

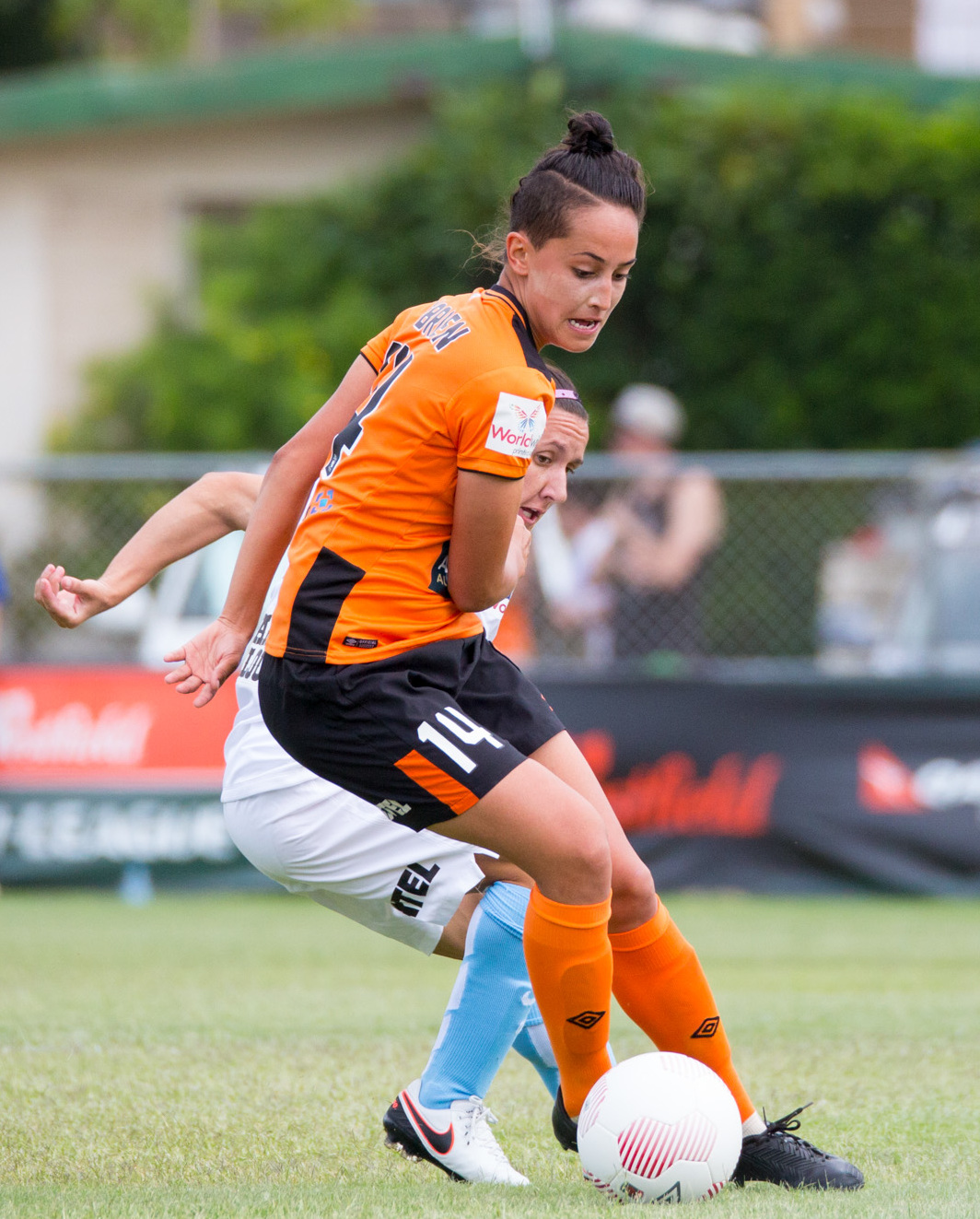
- O'Brien playing for Brisbane Roar in 2015

Personal information
- Full name: Summer O'Brien
- Date of birth: 2 October 1991 (age 35)
- Place of birth: Australia
- Position: Defender

Team information
- Current team: Brisbane Roar
- Number: 14

Senior career*
Years	Team	Apps	(Gls)
2015–	Brisbane Roar	36	(0)
- * Club domestic league appearances and goals as of 21 February 2018

Summer O'Brien (born 2 October 1991) is an Australian football player who currently plays for Brisbane Roar in the Australian W-League. She previously played for the Gap Gators in the National Premier Leagues Queensland.

== Playing career ==
=== Club ===
==== Brisbane Roar, 2015–present ====
O'Brien made her debut for Brisbane Roar on 18 October 2015 in a match against Canberra United. She made twelve appearances for the team during the 2015–16 W-League season. Brisbane finished in fourth place during the regular season securing a berth to the playoffs. During the semifinal match against regular season champions Melbourne City, the Roar was defeated 5–4 in a penalty kick shootout after 120 minutes of regular and overtime produced no goals for either side.

== Honours ==
with Gap Gators

- Players' Player Award
