= Stella Rigon =

Australian soccer player

Personal information
- Date of birth: 17 September 1989 (age 37)
- Place of birth: Henley Beach, South Australia
- Position: Forward

Team information
- Current team: Adelaide University Soccer Club
- Number: 8

Senior career*
Years	Team	Apps	(Gls)
2016-17	Adelaide United	9	(1)
- * Club domestic league appearances and goals as of 6 November 2016

Stella Rigon is an Australian soccer player. She played for Adelaide United in the W-League.

== Club career ==
=== Adelaide United, 2021-22 ===
Discussions have commenced and progressed with Adelaide United and Stella Rigon about continuing the off-field role for the 2021-22 W-League season.

=== Adelaide United, 2020-21 ===
Post-retirement from WNPL, Stella Rigon commenced an off-field role with AUFC for the 2020–21 season. Under the guidance of head coach Adrian Stenta, Stella assisted with training and mentoring players. Due to the departure of a squad member towards the end of the season, Stella Rigon accepted a playing contract as a top-up player.

=== Adelaide United, 2016–17 ===
On 3 November 2016, Stella Rigon joined Adelaide United. She made her debut in a 3–3 draw against Melbourne Victory. She scored the opening and first goal for Adelaide United in Round 1.

Adelaide United FC (W League) Stella Rigon's first game. First Goal.

=== Adelaide Uni Soccer Club ===
Post Adelaide United (W-League)- 2020–21 season, Stella continued to train with Adelaide Uni in preparation for a possible continuation of her off-field role with Adelaide United. Mid-WNPL season, Adelaide Uni approached Stella Rigon and asked if she would consider putting her playing retirement on hold and assist the WNPL Senior Team in an on-field role to mentor and support the emerging talent. Stella accepted the offer and started playing.

=== Metro United Women's Football Club ===
In the 2017 WNPL off-season, Stella Rigon joined Metro United Women's Football Club for the 2018 WNPL season under the guidance of senior WNPL coach Marie Spagnoletti. The 2018 Season also saw [Metro United Women's Football Club] secure the services of W-League and South Korean WK League side Hwacheon KSPO player Racheal Quigley, Nicole Calder, and Kelsey Zafirids, a 2016–17 [Adelaide United FC] squad member and 2017 captain for the [Campbelltown City] WNPL squad. At the Annual MUWFC Awards, Stella Rigon received the coach's award for the 2018 season.

In 2018, Metro United appointed Tony Scalzi as the senior coach of the WNPL team to replace incumbent Marie Spagnoletti whom moved into a director's role with Metro United. In 2019, Stella Metro United announced that Stella Rigon would be the WNPL captain for the 2019 season. Stella continued as captain of the WNPL side for the 2020 season. At the conclusion of the 2019 WNPL season, Metro United finished the home and away season in fourth place. During the finals series, Metro United defeated WNPL sides West Adelaide and Salisbury Inter to progress to the grand final on 9 October 2020 against Adelaide City's WNPL side. On 9 October 2020, Metro United defeated Adelaide City to take out the Championship for 2020. In 2020, Metro United defeated Adelaide City 2–1 to take out the Championship for that year.

On 12 October 2020, Stella announced her retirement from the WNPL after a 22-year playing career.

=== Fulham United Football Club ===
After a five-year absence from the premier women's football competition in South Australia, 2016 saw Rigon return to the WNPL with Fulham United FC with Max Primaro at the helm. The 2016 Season saw Fulham United FC achieve results that saw it return to the WNPL top 4 with an appearance in the inaugural WNPL finals series. Fulham United FC advanced into the WNPL finals with a first-week win over Adelaide University, thereby setting up a semi-final match against rivals Adelaide City Football Club. The semi-final saw Fulham United FC take on Adelaide City (after defeating Adelaide City to take out the WNPL Premier Reserves Cup for 2016). The game was locked at 1–1 after normal and extra time, with only a penalty shootout splitting the two. Adelaide City defeated Fulham United FC 5–4 to advance to the grand final against Metro United WFC the following week.

In 2017, Stella Rigon was appointed captain of the Premier League squad for the 2017 season.

=== Eastern Elite Women's Football Club ===
During 2014 and 2015, Stella Rigon played for division 2 side [Eastern Elite] in the FFSA Women's State League.

=== South Australian Sports Institute ===
During 2003–2005, Stella Rigon held a [SASI] scholarship in the women's soccer (football) program; Kevin McCormack was the program coach during this period.

=== Women's National League and State Representation ===
Women's National Soccer League (Pre-W-League)

2004–05: Stella Rigon was elected to represent the South Australian WNSL Side, Adelaide Sensation, at 15 years of age. This was her first time at the national senior level of competition. Adelaide Sensation was coached by the South Australian Sports Institute Soccer (football) program senior coach, Kevin McCormack.

South Australian State Representation

Between 2003 and 2006, Stella represented South Australia in the National Talent Identification Championships held over that period in Coffs Harbour and Parklea NSW.

=== Off field representations ===
In 2016, Rigon became a Smash FM South Australian Women's Football Ambassador. She is a regular contributor with an update on the SA WNPL season to date and discusses the big games in the WNPL and the season so far for Metro United Women's Football Club. In March 2017, Stella, representing the Adelaide United W-League team, participated in the State Government, Office for Recreation and Sport and the Football Federation of South Australian: Celebration of Women's Sport held at Valo Stadium at the Parks.
