= Carl Linhart =

Slovak-American baseball player (1929–2022)

- Pinch hitter/Pinch runner
- Born: December 14, 1929; Zborov, Czechoslovakia
- Died: January 4, 2022 (aged 92); Maryville, Illinois, U.S.
- Batted: Left Threw: Right

MLB debut
- August 2, 1952, for the Detroit Tigers

Last MLB appearance
- September 19, 1952, for the Detroit Tigers

MLB statistics
- At bats: 2
- Hits: 0
- Runs scored: 0
- Stats at Baseball Reference

Teams
- Detroit Tigers (1952)

Carl James Linhart (born Karol Linhart; December 14, 1929 – January 4, 2022) was a Slovak-born American professional baseball player who appeared in three Major League games played as a pinch hitter and pinch runner for the Detroit Tigers during the 1952 season. He was born in Zborov, Czechoslovakia. Linhart is one of three MLB players (along with John Stedronsky and Elmer Valo) born in the former Czechoslovakia or its pre-1918 territories.

Linhart grew up in Granite City, Illinois, and played eight minor league seasons (1948–1949; 1951–1956) as an outfielder, mostly in the Tigers' farm system. In his only Major Leaguer service, with the last-place 1952 Tigers, Linhart pinch hit for Hal Newhouser on August 2 against the Boston Red Sox, and grounded into a double play against Ralph Brickner. Almost six weeks later, on September 11, 1952, he pinch ran for Matt Batts in another game against the Red Sox at Briggs Stadium. Then, in his final big league appearance eight days later at Municipal Stadium, Linhart pinch hit for pitcher Hal White and made an out to second base against Early Wynn of the Cleveland Indians. Linhart died on January 4, 2022, at the age of 92.
