= Masbia =

Network of kosher soup kitchens in New York City

Coordinates: 40°38′17″N 73°59′7″W

- Formation: April 2005
- Type: NGO
- Purpose: Free kosher soup kitchen
- Headquarters: New York City
- Region served: Brooklyn and Queens, New York
- Founder: Mordechai Mandelbaum
- Executive Director: Alexander Rapaport
- Budget: $2 million
- Website: http://www.masbia.org

Masbia (Hebrew: משביע, lit., "satiate") is a network of kosher soup kitchens in New York City. Its three locations in the Brooklyn neighborhoods of Borough Park and Midwood, as well as the Queens neighborhood of Rego Park, serve over 500 free, hot kosher meals nightly. Masbia is the only free soup kitchen serving kosher meals in New York City. The organization receives 10% of its budget from government aid, relying heavily on private donations of money and food to meet its $2 million annual operating budget.

== Name ==
The Hebrew name Masbia comes from a verse in the Book of Psalms: "Poteach es yadecha u'masbia l'chol chai ratzon – You open Your hand and satisfy the desires of every living thing" (Psalms 145:16).

== History ==
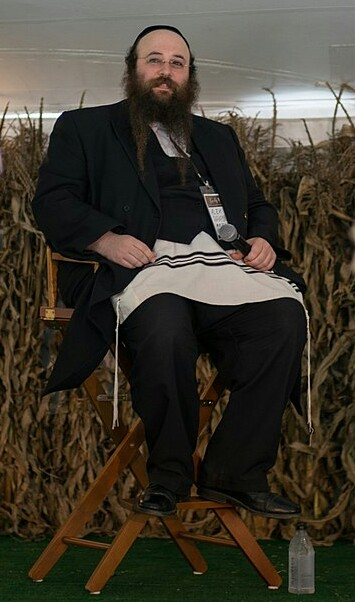
Alexander Rapaport in 2014

Mordechai Mandelbaum, a Hasidic Jewish resident of Brooklyn, donated the seed money for the first restaurant in Borough Park in 2005. He and co-founder Alexander Rapaport, another member of the Brooklyn Hasidic community, were aware of many families who had fallen on hard times and were struggling with the high costs of rent and tuition. Back in 2003, a report by the Metropolitan Council on Jewish Poverty had shown that 30% of Brooklyn Jews were living at or below the poverty line. Mandelbaum proposed the idea of feeding Jewish families in a more "formal, systematic way" through a free kosher restaurant which would be supported by others in the community who were still well-off. Masbia was set up as a restaurant in order not to humiliate singles and families who were unused to eating in a soup kitchen. Many Masbia patrons are men from the Hasidic community, for whom poverty is a cultural sign of shame.

The Borough Park restaurant opened in April 2005 in a converted railroad apartment. On opening night, the staff prepared 25 meals and only eight people showed up. Six months later, 120 patrons were frequenting the restaurant nightly. The restaurant's logo, a tent with openings on all four sides, recalls the tent of Abraham, the Jewish paragon of hospitality whose tent was open to all comers.

Beginning in 2009, the worsening recession prompted the Metropolitan Council on Jewish Poverty to ally with Masbia, resulting in the opening of additional free restaurants in Williamsburg (opened November 2009), Midwood (opened November 2009), and Rego Park, Queens (opened March 2010). The new locations increased Masbia's overall patronage by 300%. In fiscal year 2010–2011, Masbia served 82,292 meals, a 50% increase over the previous year. In fiscal year 2012–2013, nearly 450,000 meals were served. In 2013 the Williamsburg location closed due to funding shortfalls and lack of customers.

== Operations ==
Masbia serves over 500 meals nightly in Brooklyn and Queens. Rain or snow usually decreases the nightly patronage to about 400 diners, while Thursday nights can see up to 600 diners.

The dining rooms, open Sunday through Thursday from 4:00 to 9:00 p.m., have an upscale look, with polished wood floors, cloth-covered tables, and wall paintings. Food is served on trays by waiters. Artificial plants, screens or curtains, depending on the location, shield tables for privacy. The three-course meals include chicken, a starch, vegetables, fruit, bread and a hot drink. For example, the menu in Queens one night was vegetable soup, roasted chicken, mashed potatoes, corn on the cob, watermelon, apples, rolls, and hot tea. One night a year, on the yahrtzeit of the Kerestir Rebbe, Rabbi Yeshayah Steiner (d. 1925), who was known for feeding the hungry, steak is served. Meals are always meat-based except during The Nine Days, when Masbia serves fish dishes. Masbia also schedules a Seder on the first two nights of Passover which draw around 40 participants each.

Food for all the restaurants is prepared fresh daily at the Midwood location on Coney Island Boulevard, a former restaurant with a large commercial kitchen. The paid kitchen staff consists of a chef and helper; up to 25 volunteers assist them. The menu is largely dependent on the produce and foodstuffs that are donated that day; during periods when the same vegetable, such as carrots, is all that is available, the cook will vary the menu by preparing it sweet one day, salty the next. Day-old produce and leftovers from outside catered events, such as weddings, are not accepted, so as to uphold the dignity of patrons. Leftovers from the meals themselves are frozen in containers and handed out on Thursdays for patrons to take home for their Shabbat meals. This food package program, begun in the 2010–2011 fiscal year, has seen the distribution of 68,522 take-home meals.

== Fundraising ==
The organization's $2 million budget is partially covered by city and state aid and mostly acquired through donations. In addition to soliciting monetary donations, Masbia has a corps of volunteers who collect donated food throughout the city. Beginning in summer 2010, Masbia began collecting weekly donations of fresh produce from the Food Bank For New York City and New York City Harvest, and unsold produce from farmers markets in Boro Park and Windsor Terrace. During the Nine Days, 2,500 portions of fish are donated to Masbia by the Dagim company.

Recalling a tradition in the European shtetl for families to sponsor a meal for the poor on the day of their child's wedding, Masbia encourages couples and their parents to sponsor meals – at $6 a plate – at Masbia on the night before or the night of their wedding. Several Rebbes from Boro Park and Williamsburg have sponsored and also hosted the meal for the poor at Masbia on the night before their child's wedding, including the Kosover Rebbe, the Satmar Rebbe, the Bobover Rebbe, the Spinker Rebbe, and the Faltishaner Rebbe; the latter was joined by his son, the groom.

Masbia solicits endorsements from well-known Orthodox Jewish personalities to aid in its fundraising. These include bestselling kosher cookbook author Susie Fishbein, who in 2010 launched a "Book Dinner at Masbia" campaign offering a free cookbook for every $120 donation and in 2013 donated new tables and chairs for the restaurants; Hasidic celebrity Lipa Schmeltzer, who volunteered to help serve on steak night; and artist Jodi Reznik, who donated her paintings to decorate the walls of the restaurant.

== See also ==
- List of kosher restaurants
