= Bodrogkeresztúr =

Bodrogkeresztúr Kerestir or קערעסטיר
- Municipality
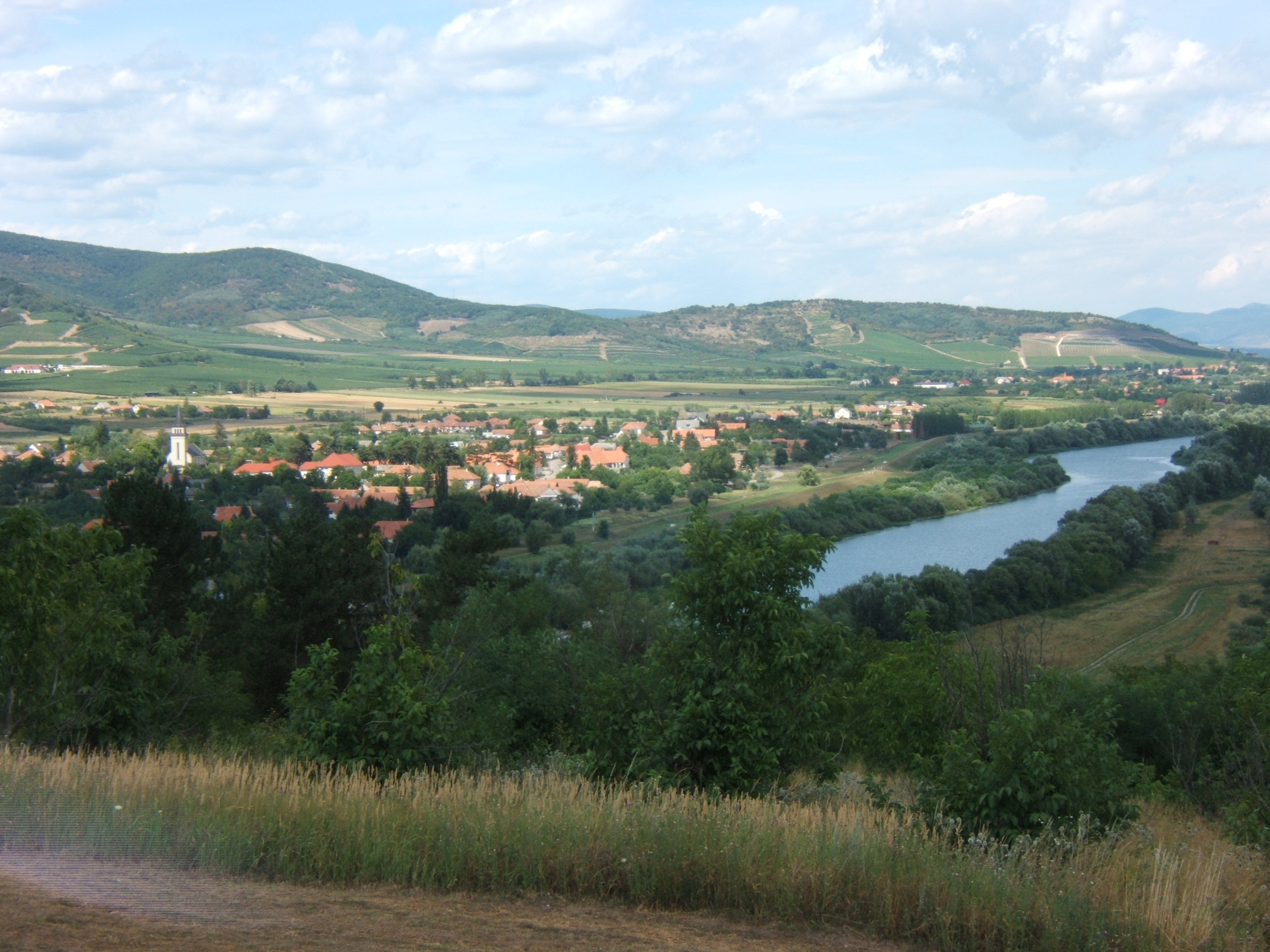
- View of Bodrogkeresztúr

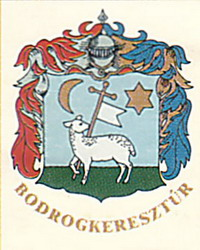
- Seal

- Location within Hungary
- Coordinates: 48°9′37″N 21°21′35″E
- Country: Hungary
- Region: Northern Hungary
- County: Borsod-Abaúj-Zemplén
- Processus: Tokaji járás

Government
  - Mayor: Májer József

Area
  - Total: 29.87 km^{2} (11.53 sq mi)

Population (2015)
  - Total: 1,109
  - Density: 37.96/km^{2} (98.3/sq mi)
- Time zone: UTC+1 (CET)
  - Summer (DST): UTC+2 (CEST)
- Postal code: 3916
- Area code: 47

Bodrogkeresztúr (shortly, "Keresztúr", Yiddish: קערעסטיר) is a village in Borsod-Abaúj-Zemplén county, in the Tokaj District, Hungary.

Before World War II, there was a sizable Jewish community in Bodrogkeresztúr. At its height, there were 535 Jews in the community, but most of them were murdered by the Nazis during the Holocaust in Hungary.

Rabbi Yeshaya Steiner of the Kerestir Hasidic dynasty lived Bodrogkeresztúr at 67 Kossuth Utca. The house still serves tens of thousands of people annually, especially on the anniversary of his death.

== History ==
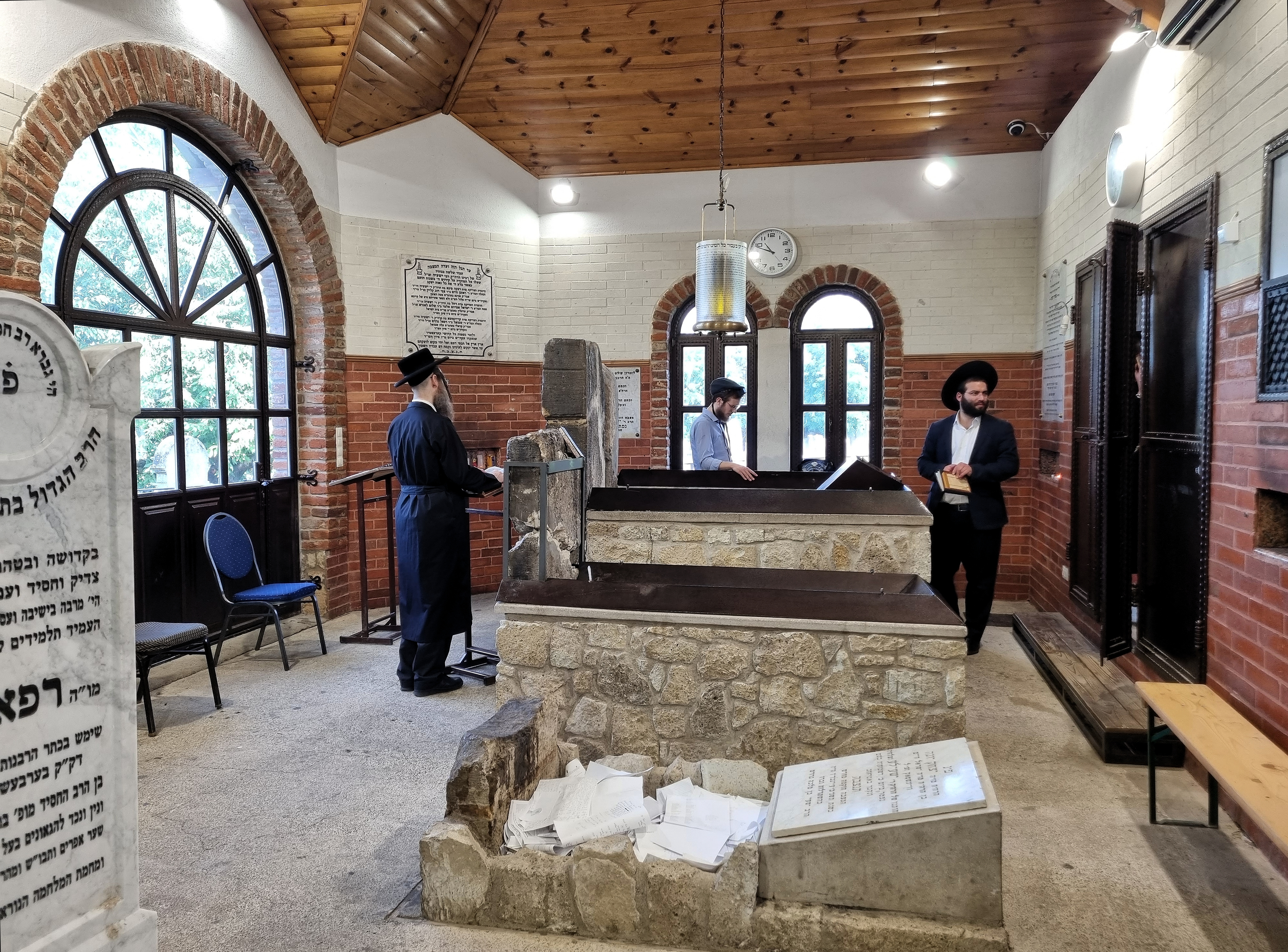
The grave of Yeshayah Steiner (Reb Shaya'la Kerestirer) in Kerestir (Borsod-Abaúj-Zemplén County, Hungary).

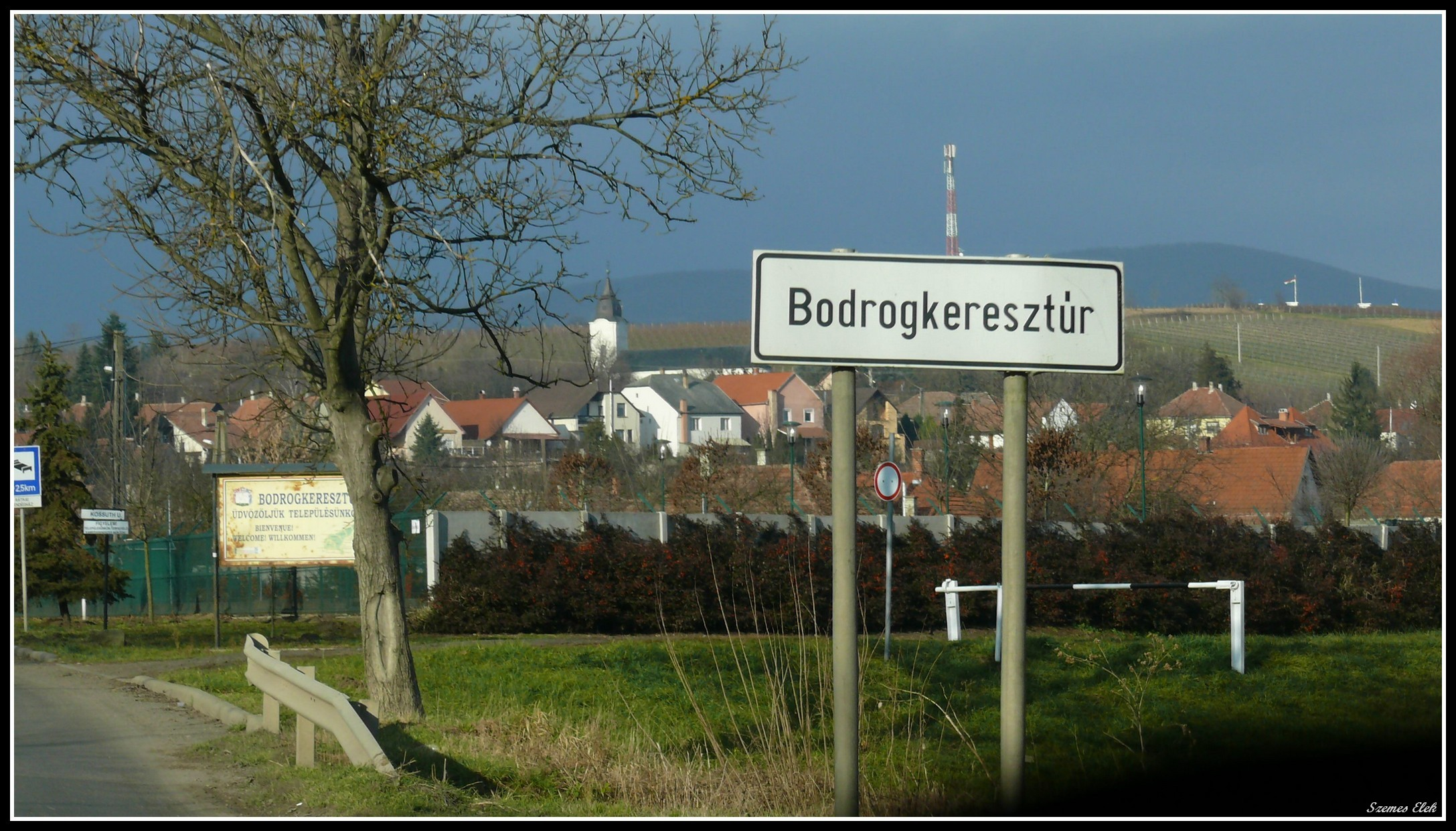
Entrance to the village

The area around Bodrogkeresztúr has been inhabited since prehistoric times, notably evidenced by the "Treasure of Dereszla," a collection of gold jewelry dating back to approximately 1200 BCE. The exact origin of the village's name is unknown; it may have been named after crusader knights. The settlement and its fortress were first mentioned in 1239, likely destroyed during the Mongol invasion. From 1411, the village became part of the Tokaj estate. By the 16th century, it was mentioned as a market town, and from the end of that century until the mid-17th century, a printing press operated there.

The Rákóczi's War of Independence took a toll on the village, but it managed to recover, mainly due to viticulture, modernized significantly by Hasidic Jewish settlers who arrived in 1726. During the 1848–49 War of Independence, the settlement was looted. Rabbi Yeshaya Steiner (1851–1925), a revered rabbi who died in Bodrogkeresztúr in 1925, was a prominent member of the Jewish community; his former residence became a memorial house and pilgrimage site.

=== Jewish History and Community Development ===
The Jewish history of Bodrogkeresztúr began in the early 18th century. The first records of Jewish inhabitants date to a 1726 census, which noted seven Jewish families who had immigrated from Poland and Galicia. Initially working as land tenants and agricultural laborers, the Jewish community eventually took over the distribution of Tokaj wine from Greek traders. They played a significant role in modernizing viticulture and producing kosher wines.

By 1880, the Orthodox Jewish community numbered 309, constituting nearly 25% of the village population. At its peak in 1930, the community reached 535 individuals. The community established a burial society (Hevra Kaddisha) in 1767. While the village once had three synagogues, only the largest—the Neologue synagogue built in 1906—remains today, currently serving as an office for the Aggtelek National Park.

=== The "Miracle Rabbi": Reb Shayale ===
The village's global spiritual significance is almost entirely tied to Rabbi Yeshaya Steiner (1851–1925), affectionately known as Reb Shayale. Born in Zborov, Steiner became a disciple of the Tzaddik of Olaszliszka. He moved to Bodrogkeresztúr to avoid leadership disputes, establishing his own Hasidic court.

He was renowned for his extreme humility and his dedication to hospitality (Hachnosas Orchim); it is said his kitchen cooked for hundreds daily so that no one went hungry. Followers attributed supernatural powers to him, including the ability to heal the sick and provide blessings for livelihood. A famous folk legend involves him ridding a granary of mice, leading to the custom of hanging his portrait in homes to ward off pests.

=== The Holocaust and Post-War Decline ===
The Jewish community was devastated during World War II. Following the 1944 German occupation, Hungarian gendarmes rounded up the village's Jews, crowding them into the synagogue. They were moved to the Sátoraljaújhely ghetto and subsequently deported to Auschwitz in May 1944. Of the approximately 700 Jews associated with the community, fewer than 100 survived the camps. Around 37 survivors returned to the village in 1945 but found a hostile local environment; many of their homes and properties had been expropriated by the local population. The last Jewish residents left following the 1956 Hungarian Uprising.

=== Modern Pilgrimage and Resurgence ===
Since the fall of communism in 1989, Bodrogkeresztúr has transformed into a massive pilgrimage site. Annually, on the anniversary of Reb Shayale's death (the 3rd of Iyar), tens of thousands of Hasidic Jews from the US, Israel, and Europe visit his grave and memorial house. Estimates for recent gatherings have reached as high as 50,000 pilgrims.

Descendants of the rabbi, particularly the Rubin family, have repurchased Steiner's former residence at 67 Kossuth Utca and converted it into a memorial house and guest complex. Modern facilities now include a ritual bath (mikveh), prayer rooms, and 24-hour food services. The massive influx of visitors has created a "culture shock" for the approximately 1,000 non-Jewish locals. While some appreciate the economic activity, others complain about rising property prices and the crowds, with some expressing open hostility toward the returning pilgrims.

== See also ==
- Exaltation of the Holy Cross Church
