= Exaltation of the Holy Cross Church, Bodrogkeresztúr =

Exaltation of the Holy Cross Church
- Szent Kereszt felmagasztalása-templom (Hungarian)

- Location within Hungary
- 48.16352825279813°N 21.3628488171012°E
- Location: Bodrogkeresztúr
- Country: Hungary
- Denomination: Catholic Church
- Sui iuris church: Latin Church

Architecture
- Functional status: Active
- Style: Gothic
- Years built: 1481–1520

Administration
- Archdiocese: Archdiocese of Eger

The Exaltation of the Holy Cross Church (Hungarian: Szent Kereszt felmagasztalása-templom) is a Gothic Catholic parish church in Bodrogkeresztúr, northern Hungary. It is located within the Tokaj Wine Region UNESCO World Heritage site.

== History ==
The church in Late Gothic style was built between 1481 and 1520. The sanctuary and nave gained their current form in 1520, as noted by an inscription saying ANNO DOMINI 1520.

During the Reformation, Bodrogkeresztúr became a Calvinist village; the Reformed congregation began using the church and converted its interior to suit their faith. The Gothic stone carvings were chiselled away, the church was painted white, and the floor level was raised and covered with stone slabs. During the 18th century, the church was given back to the Catholic community.

In 2017, a large-scale archaeological excavation began on the church grounds, and the frescoes painted during the Reformation were restored.

== Gallery ==
Aerial view

Tower

Eastern side of the church

Interior

Original frescos

Sanctuary

== See also ==
- Roman Catholicism in Hungary
- Bodrogkeresztúr
