= Zborov Castle =

Castle in Slovakia

- Zborov, Slovakia
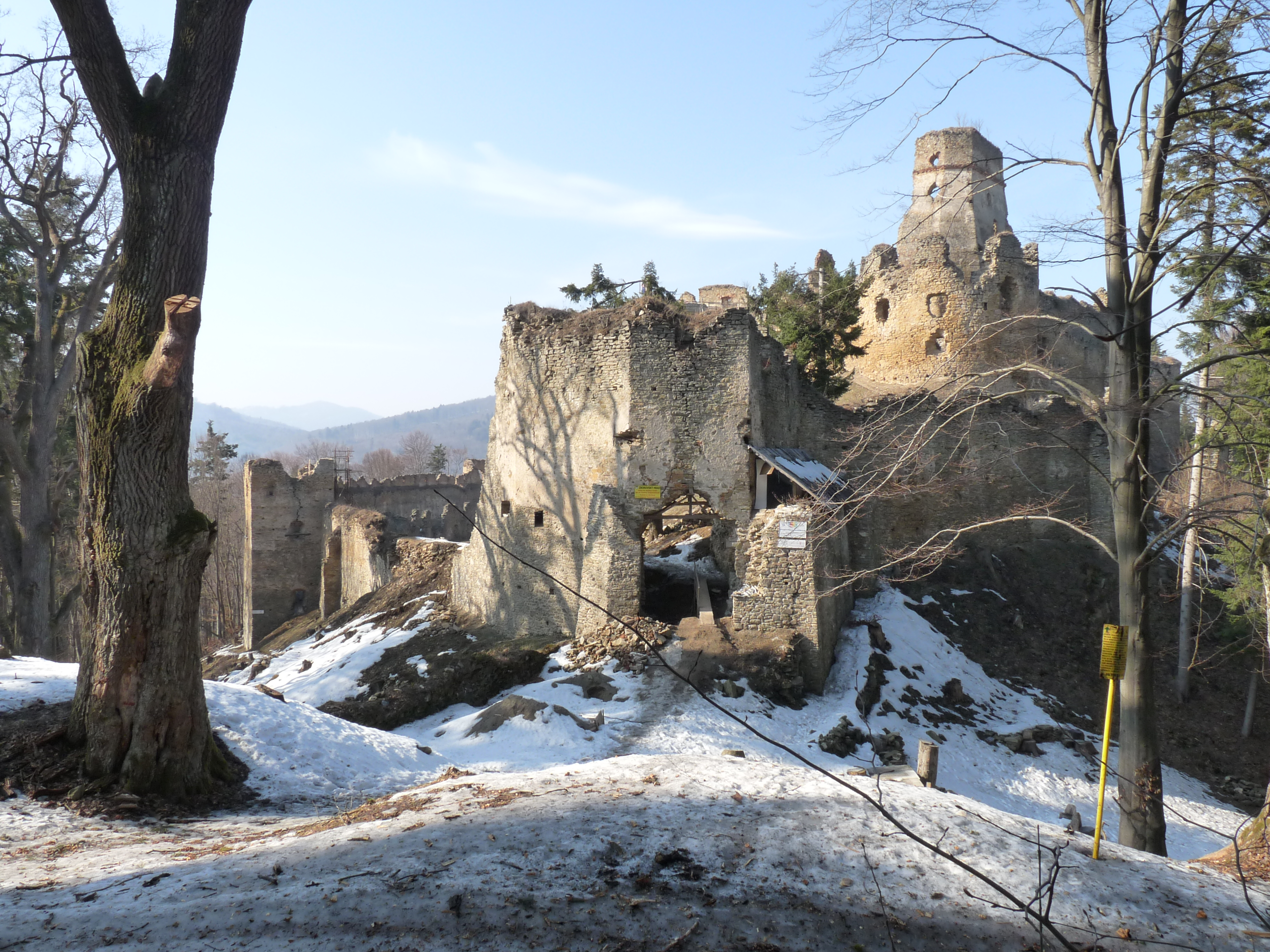
- A view of Zborov Castle from the main gate (March 2012)

Site information
- Type: Ruined castle, Hilltop castle,
- Owner: Municipality of Zborov (legal owner); Združenie na záchranu Zborovského hradu (caretaker association)
- Condition: Ruined
- Website: Hradzborov.sk

Location
- Coordinates: 49°21′12″N 21°17′53″E

Site history
- Built: 13th century

Zborov Castle (Slovak Zborovský hrad, also called Makovica; Hungarian Zboró vára) is a ruined Gothic, Renaissance and Baroque era stone castle above the village of Zborov in Bardejov District, Prešov Region, in east Slovakia. The village of Zborov and Zborov Castle lie in the traditional region of Šariš. The castle is listed in the National Cultural Heritage list of the Monuments Board of the Slovak Republic.

== History ==
According to a legend, the Zborov village was founded by a vassal of Béla IV of Hungary called Makó. He received the area as a donation from the king and after the Mongol invasion he built a castle here. It is more likely, however, that the castle of Zborov was built around 1270 by Otto Biberstein. Other sources situate the founding of the castle at the beginning of the 14th century. It is first mentioned in the charter of king Lajos I of Hungary of 26 April 1347, and then in 1349 in the charter of the convent of Jasov. In 1364 Peter Ónodi Czudar received the village for his service and loyalty as a royal donation together with the area of the Gaboltov village, making the castle the center of an extensive estate. The new owner began intensive settlement of the estate. During the clash between Queen Elizabeth of Poland and Hungary and King Albert, Hussite armies destroyed the estate.

In 1470, after the death of Czudar Jakab, the Czudar family died out and the estate was reigned as king. In 1471 Mátyás Hunyadi gave the castle and his estate to the Rozgonyi family. This year, Polish troops stormed the area during the battles between King Matthias and Casimir the King of Poland. In 1491-92, during the throne struggles following the death of Matthias, another settlement was attacked by the Polish, and the whole estate was destroyed. In 1512 the kingdom returned to the king, who gave it to the Tarczays, and after the Battle of Mohács it became the property of János Szapolyai. The first church of the village was built at this time, the date of construction of which is not known, is related to the name of Rozgonyi or Tarczay family. By 1541, the church and the parish building were already standing. In 1540, after the death of Szapolyai, King Ferdinand I divided the estate among his followers, the Dessewffy, Péchy and Tahy families. The division lasted until 1548, when the castle and its estate became the royal donation of Gáspár Serédy, the captain of the Kosice. The new owner saw the fortification of the castle as a result of the impending Turkish threat, to which he brought in Italian masters of modern castle architecture. He built new residential and farm buildings, a Renaissance palace and high walls. In 1571 the estate became András Balassa's Nógrád bishop, who married Gáspár Serédy's widow Anna Méray. In 1601 it was purchased and repaired by Zsigmond Rákóczi. Later, however, he built a castle for himself at the northwestern end of the village, where in 1666 Ferenc Rákóczi I and Ilona Zrínyi were married. After Rákóczi's death, Ilona Zrínyi became the wife of Imre Thököly, so the castle became one of the strengths of the anti-Habsburg uprising. It was protected by Ilona Zrínyi in 1684, but captured and destroyed on 14 October 1684 by the Emperors led by General Schlutz. As a donation to Julianna Rákóczi, the castle became the property of the Aspermont and later the Erdődy family. In the late 1800s, the castle was destroyed by fire. The castle was destroyed by cannon fire in 1914, along with the church next to it, and has since been ruined. The village built its first stone church in the early 17th century in the area of the old cemetery. The old wooden church was given to Hossure, where it stood until 1787. The church was finally consecrated on December 5, 1655, in honor of Benedict Kisdy, Bishop of Eger, in honor of Saint Margaret of Antioch. On March 23, 1876, the church tower and roof structure burned down in a fire, but it was rebuilt. In the fall of 1915, he suffered serious damage again during the First World War.

== Legends ==
Local legends say that the castle was originally to be built on the nearby higher hill of Hradske but all the stones placed there to build the castle mysteriously moved during the night onto the nearby lower hill on which it now stands. Rumours held that Hradske was the site of a gate into hell and that devils were moving the stones during the night to stop the gate being blocked. Eventually the efforts to build the castle on Hradske were abandoned and construction moved to the current site.

Later, the devil who was responsible for moving the stones was caught and bricked up in the walls of the highest tower in the castle where his horns can still be seen today. It is widely believed however, that the workers didn't want to carry the stones up to the original site as it was too high and so they secretly moved their work from the day to the smaller hill during the night. They then spread the tales about hauntings so that construction would be moved to the easier to climb hill.

== Access and tourism ==
The castle can be reached by turning right, off the main Bardejov to Zborov road, just after the village sign. From the bridge, it is a ten to fifteen minute walk up the hill to the castle. Another access route is from the nearby Dlhá Lúka, a northern rural borough of Bardejov.

In the village of Zborov there is a tourist information office at Obrancov Mieru 10, providing further information on the castle.

== Preservation ==
A local civic association, Združenie na záchranu Zborovského hradu, was formed in the late 2000s to prevent further deterioration of the ruins and contribute to their research and careful conservation. Work so far has included cutting all trees within 20 metres of the outer curtain wall to stop the roots undermining the foundations.

== Gallery ==
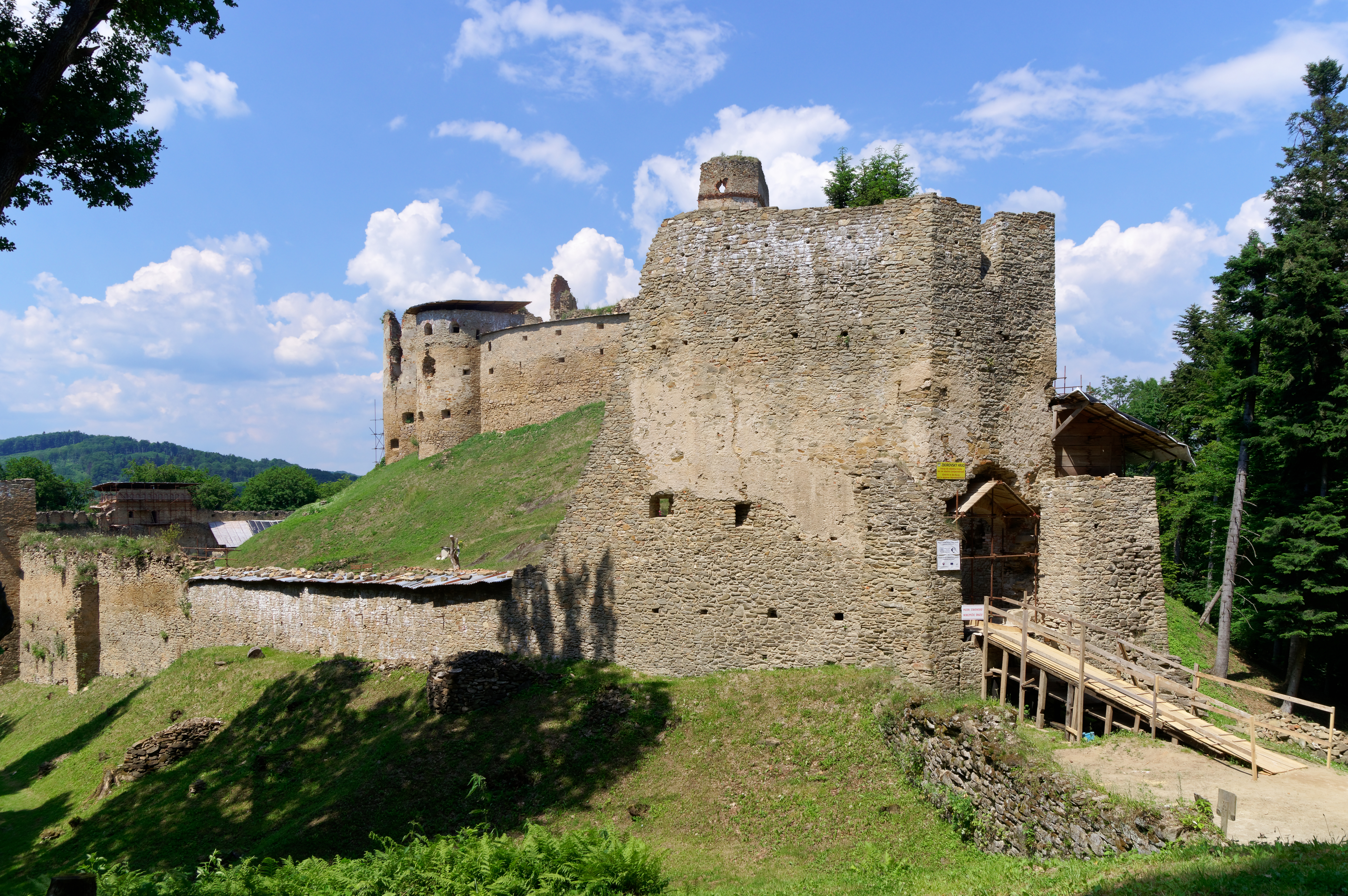
The castle undergoing annual conservation work in the early summer (June 2018)

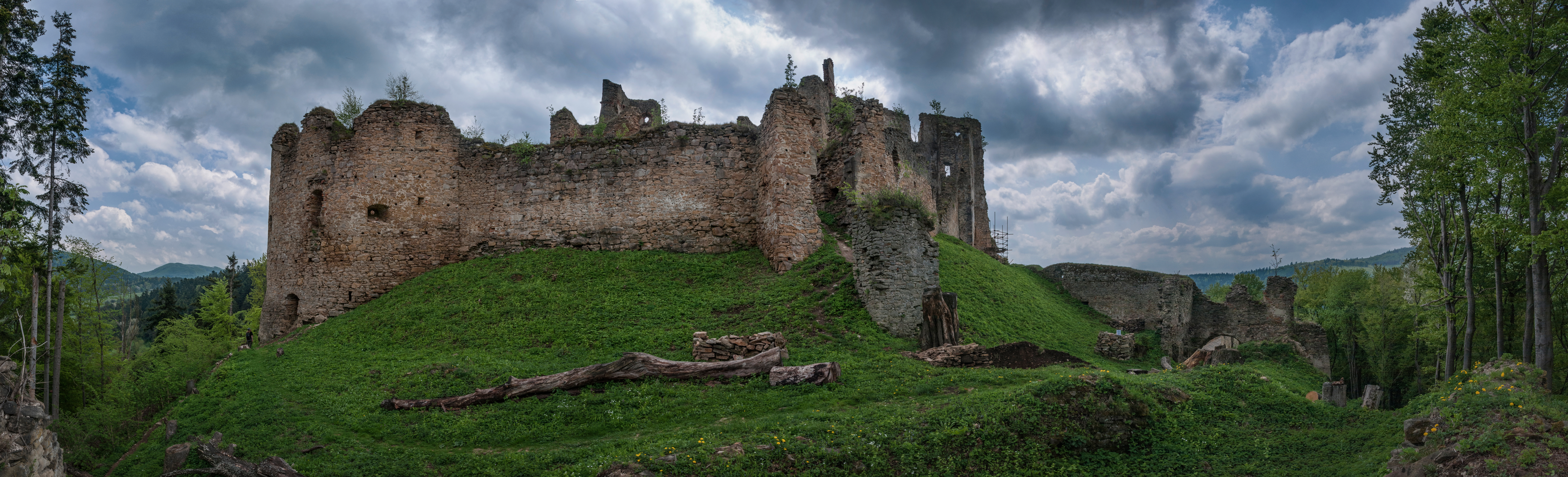
A full panorama of Zborov Castle during spring time, from a distance (May 2013)

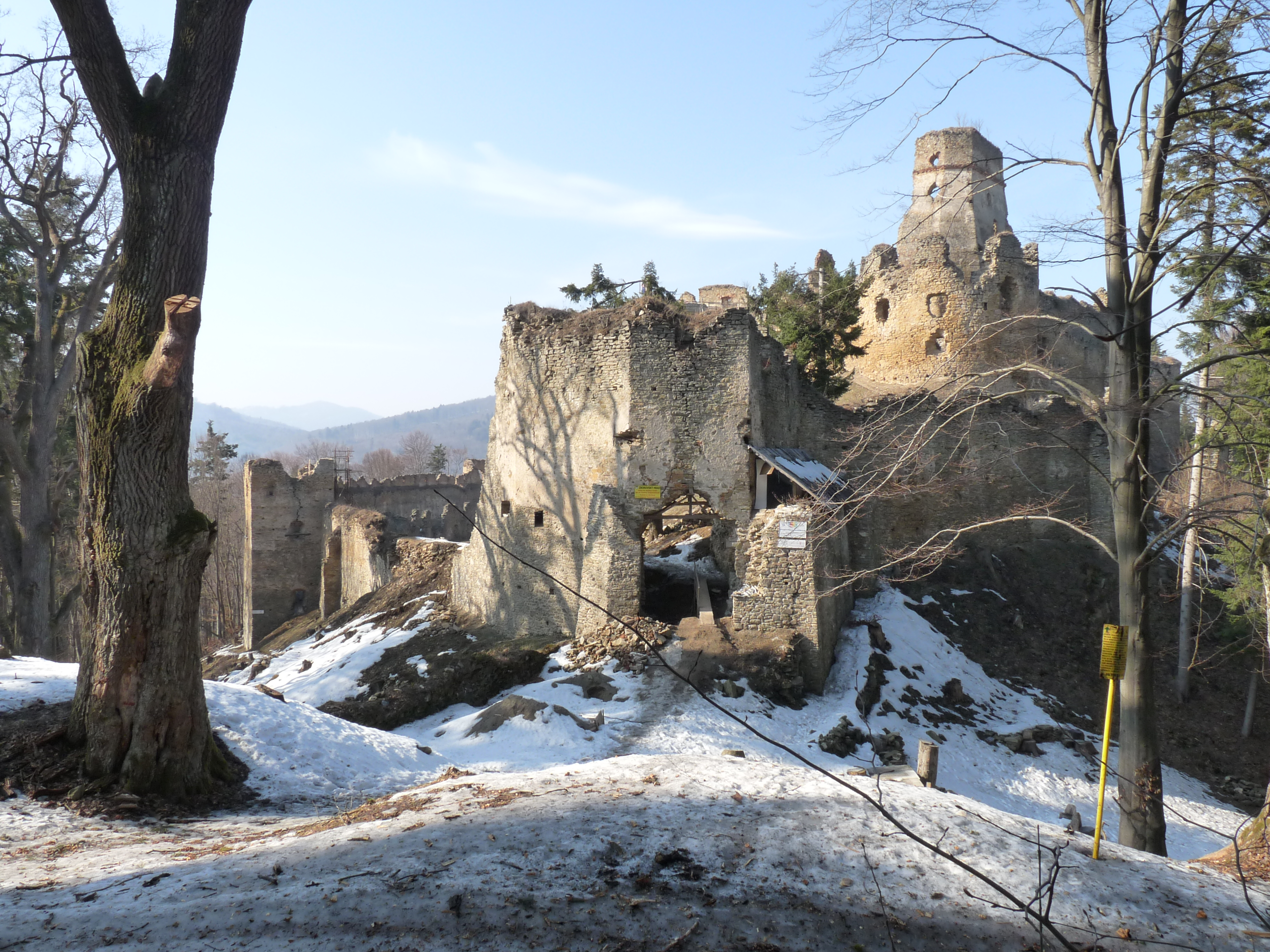
A view of the castle from the main gate, in early spring (March 2012)

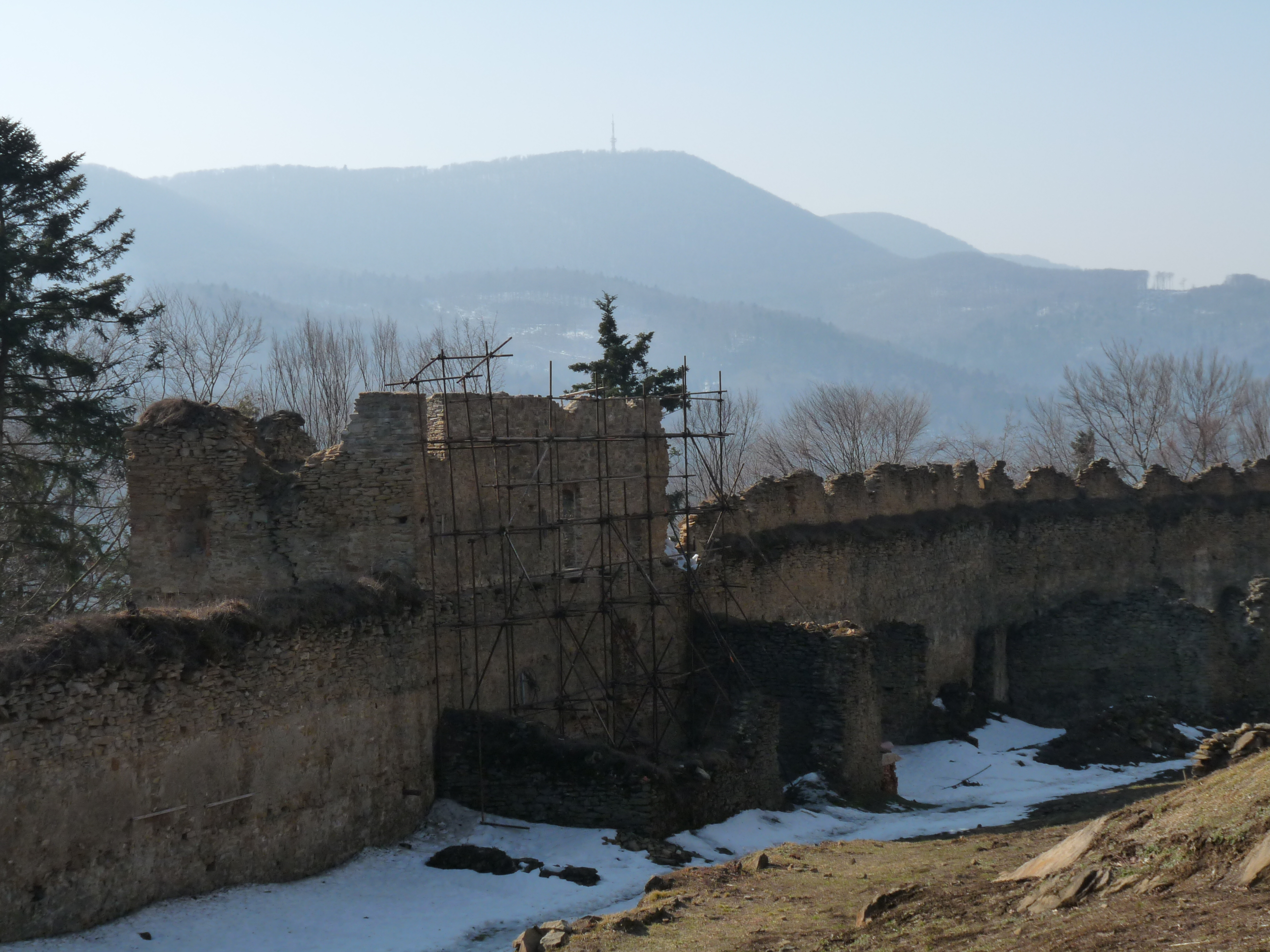
The western walls of the Lower Castle in early March, the Stebnická Magura range in the distance (March 2012)

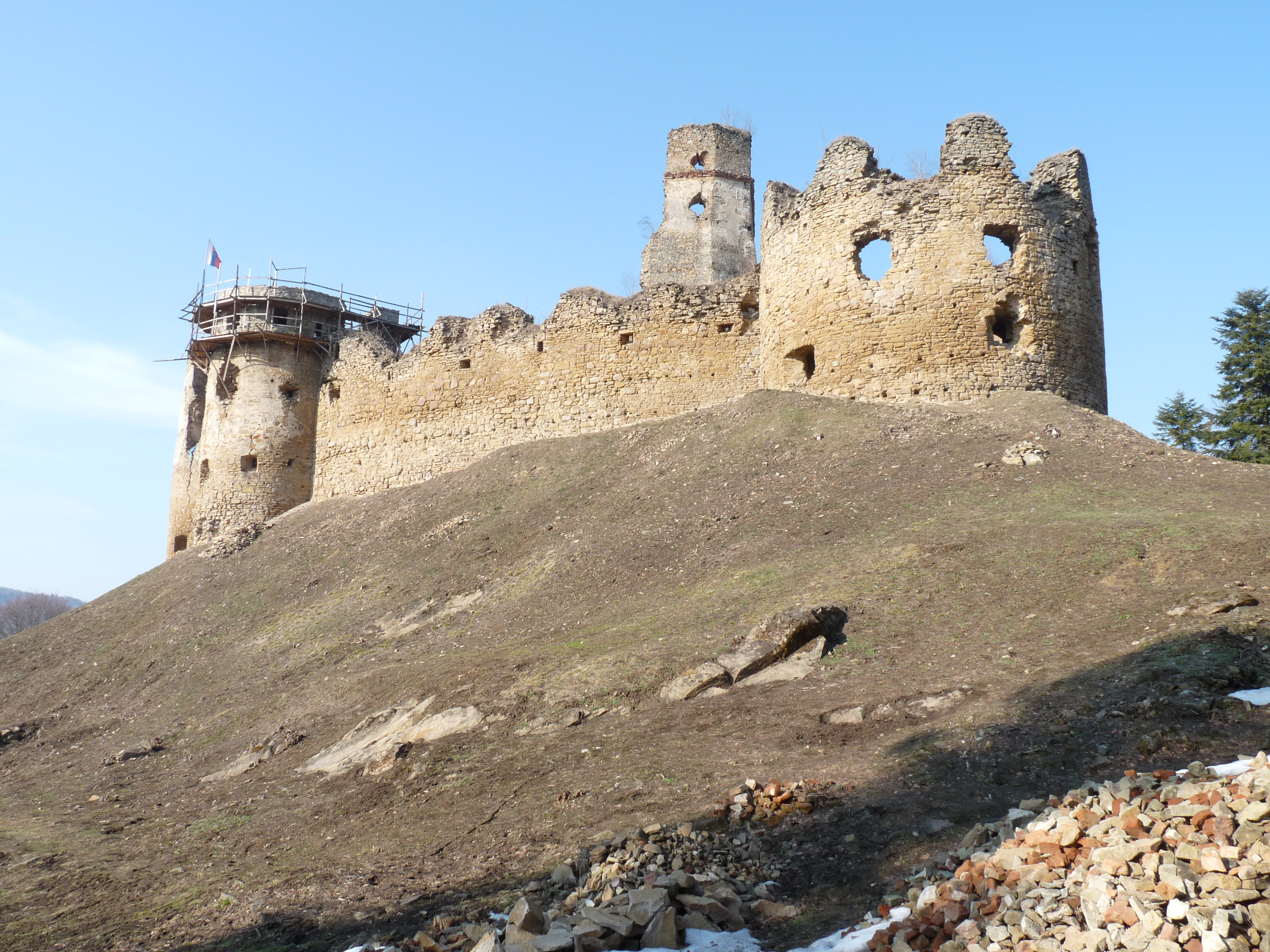
The Upper Castle in early spring (March 2012)

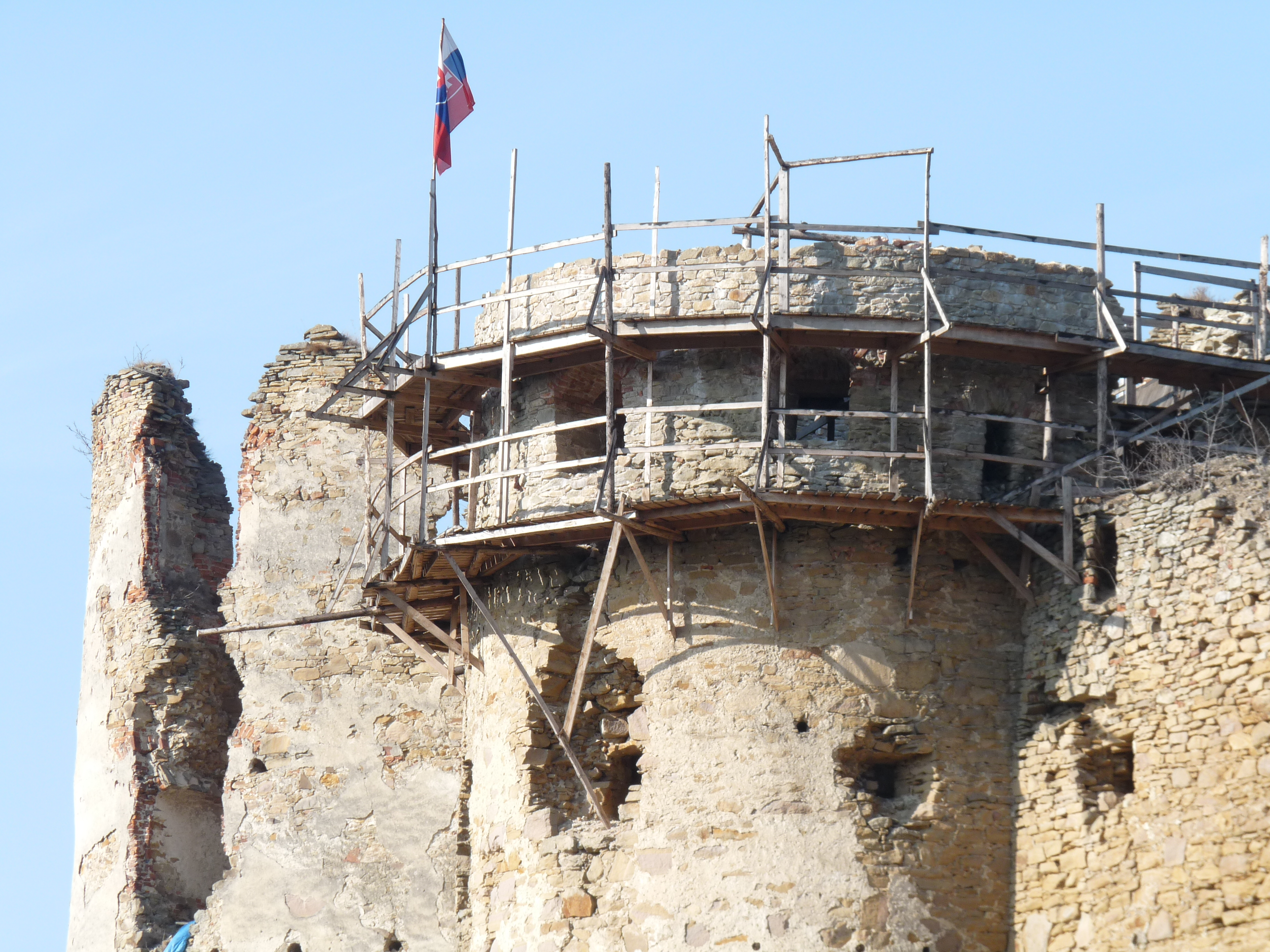
Scaffolding for conservation works, on one of the towers of the Upper Castle (March 2012)

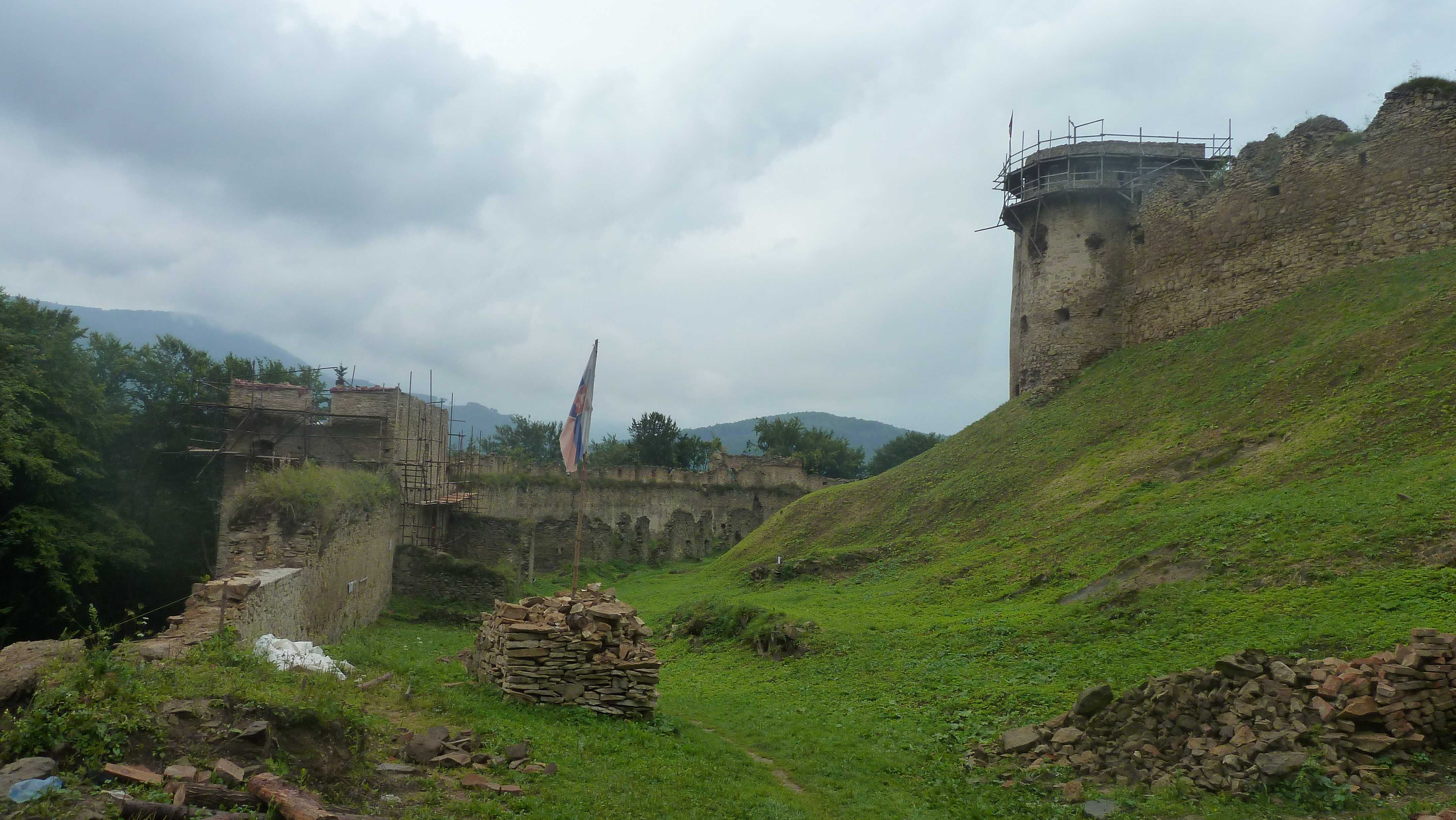
Collected original masonry from the ruined parts of the castle, ready for reuse in their preservation (August 2012)

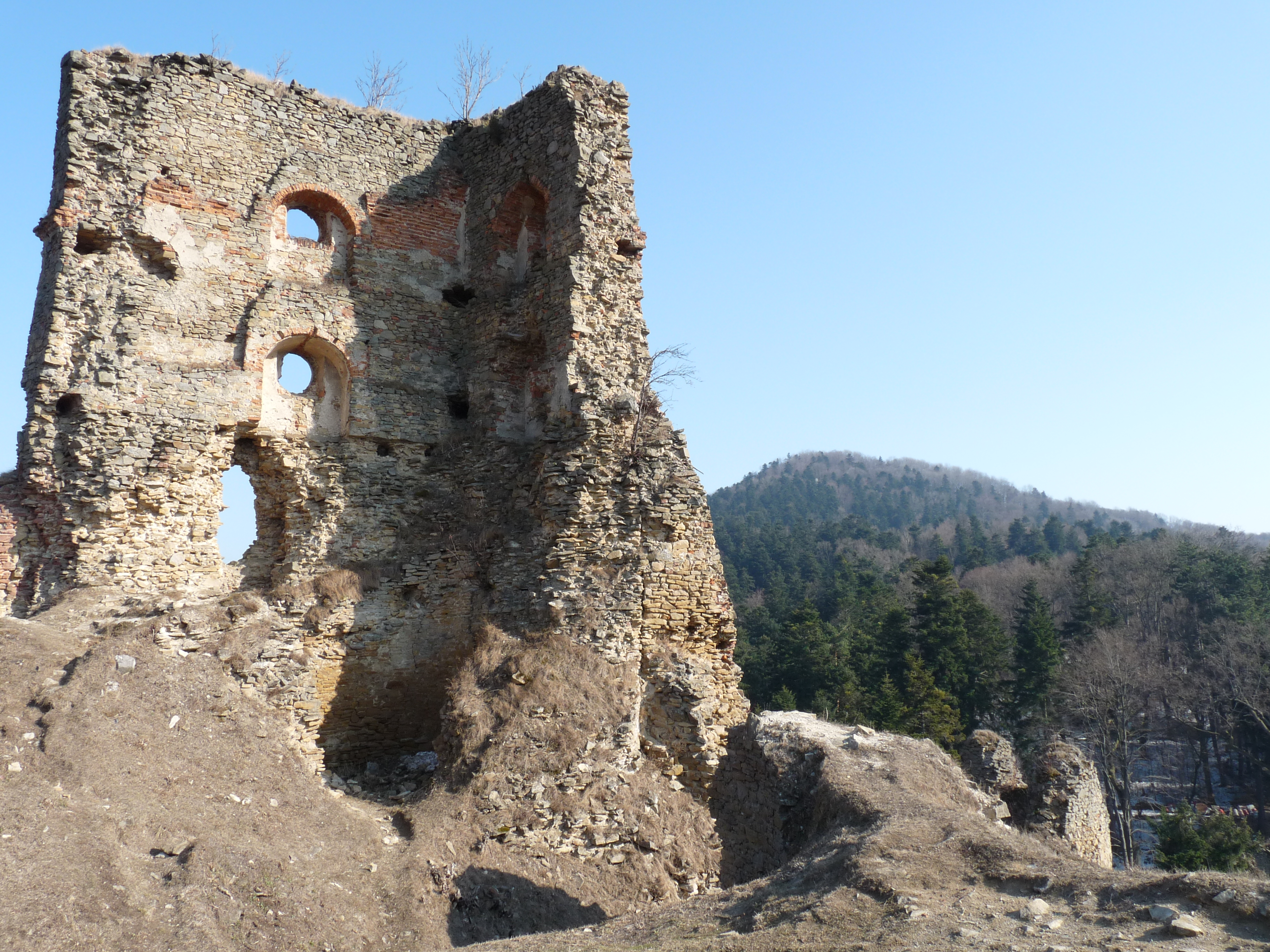
One of the partly ruined wings of the Upper Castle (March 2012)

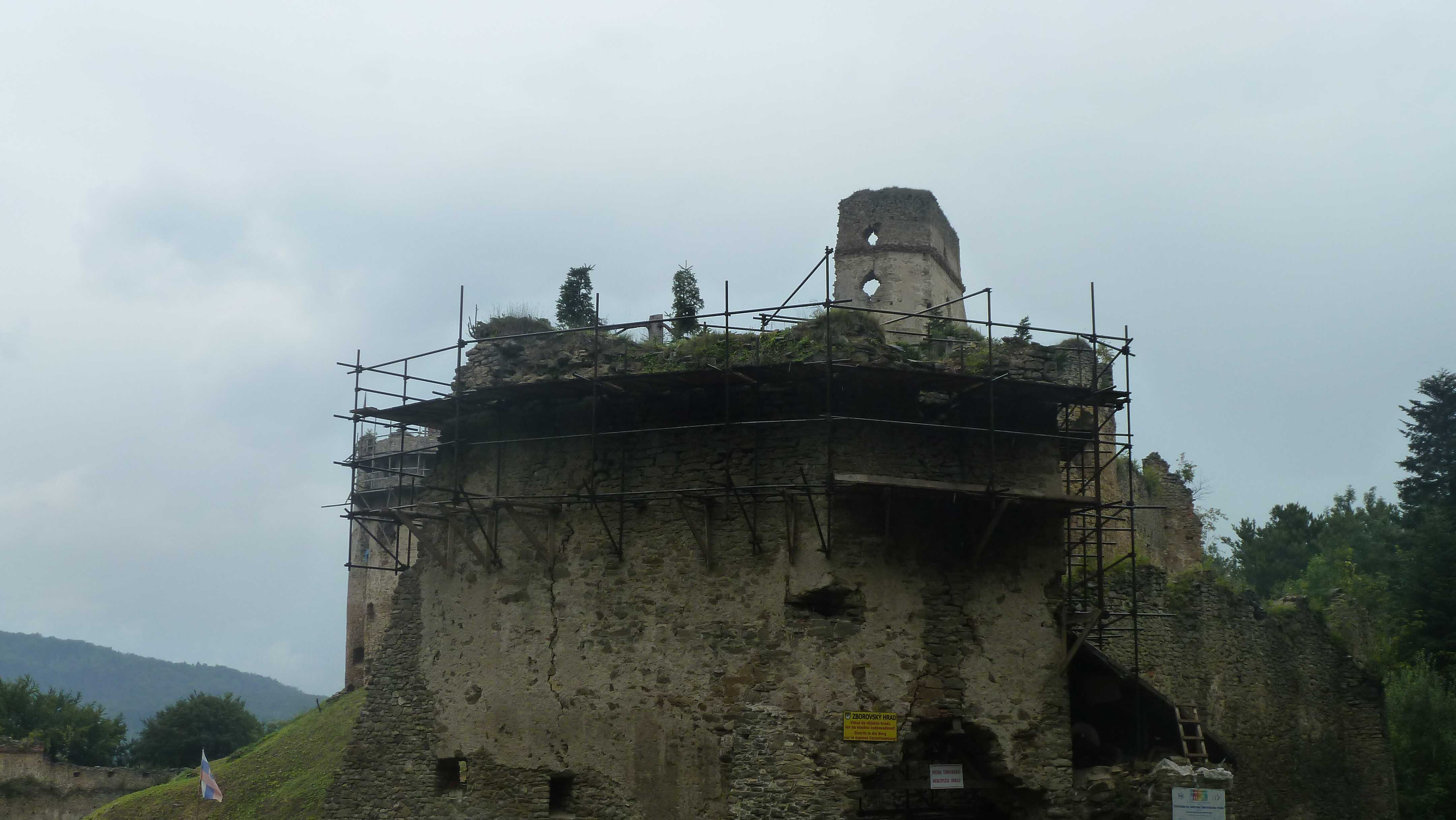
Scaffolding on the upper part of the main gate (August 2012)

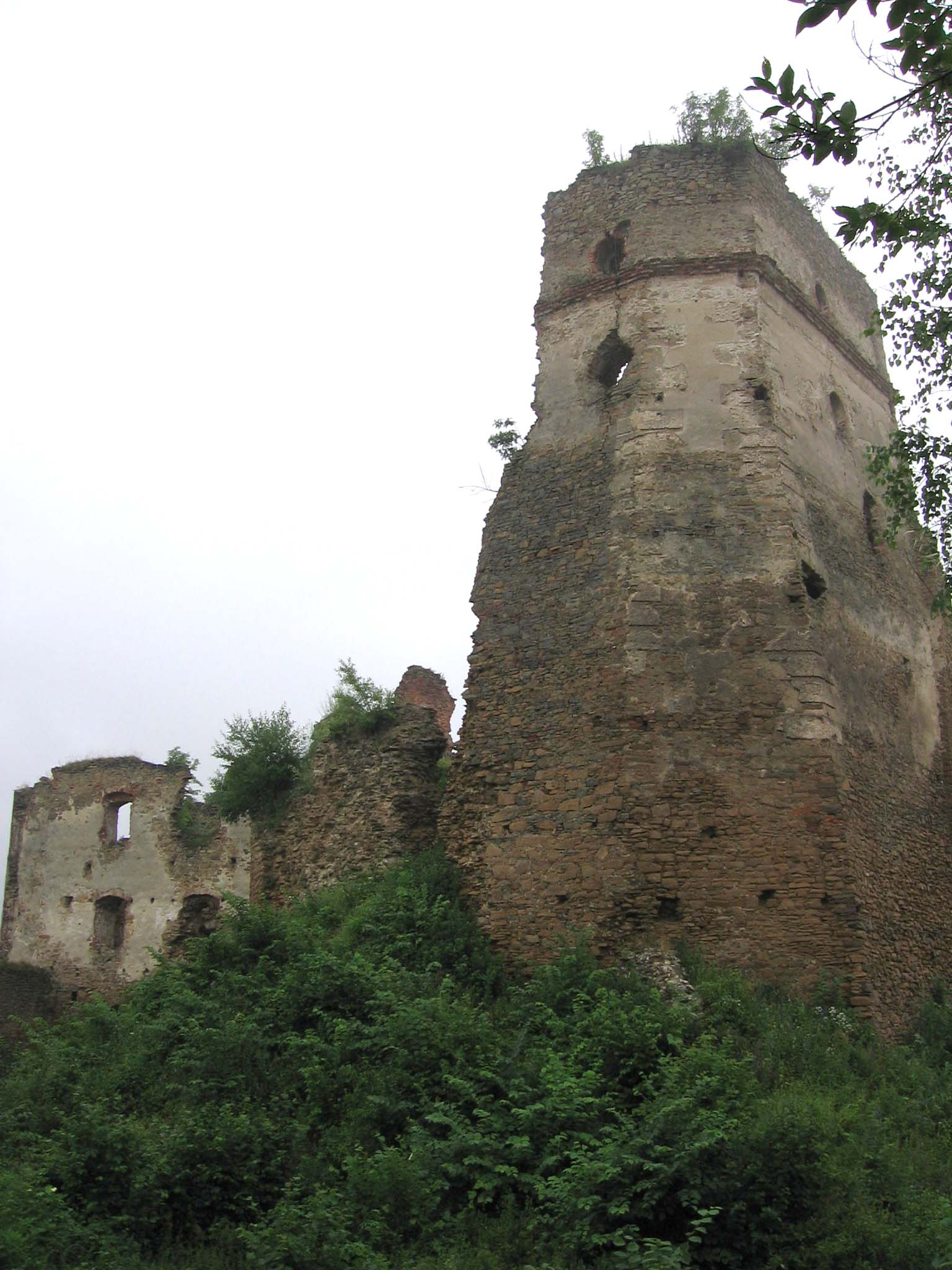
Overgrown tower and grand hall of the Upper Castle in the 2000s, before renewed research and conservation works (summer 2005)

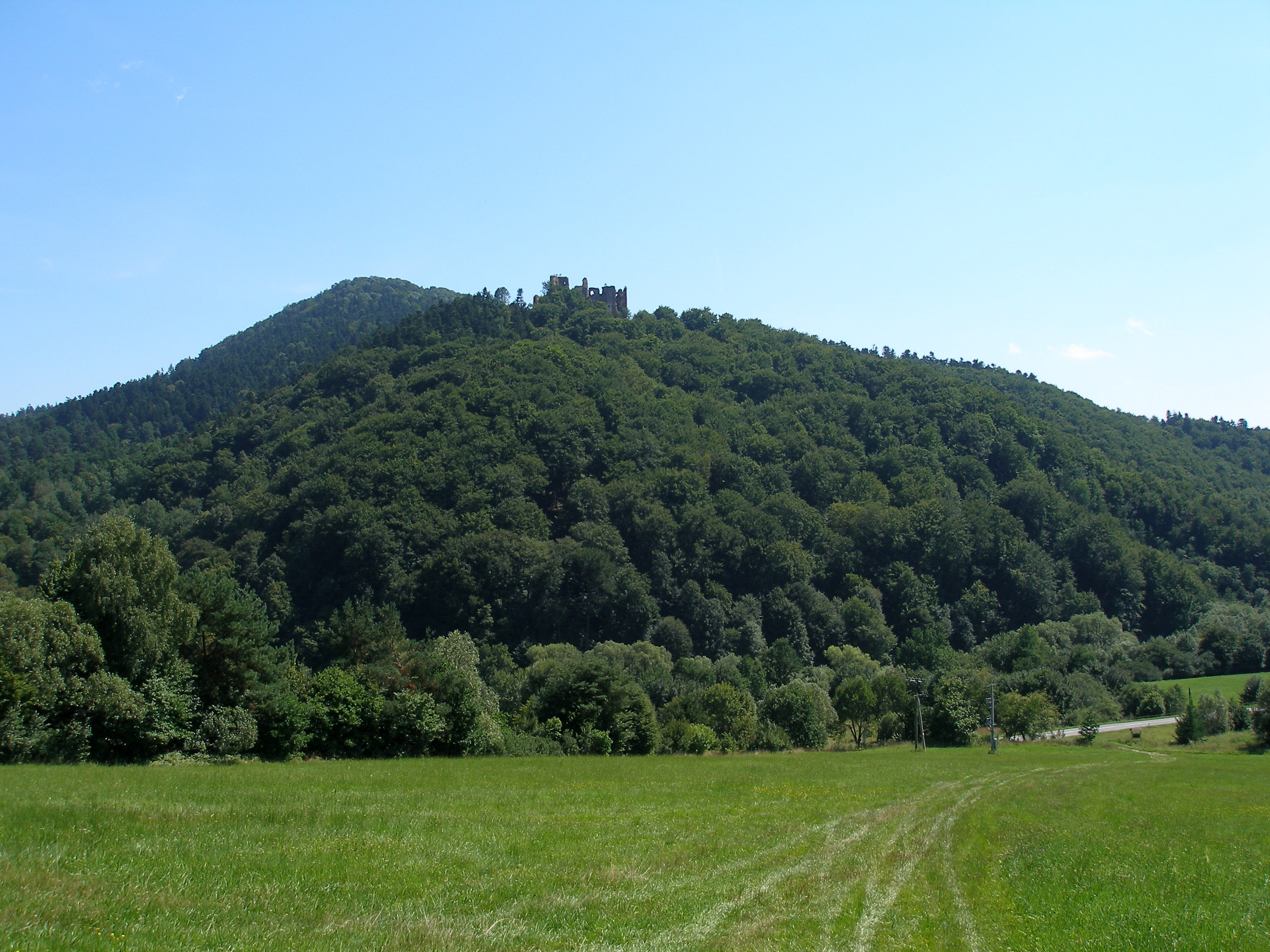
Zborov Castle hill, during the summer (August 2011)

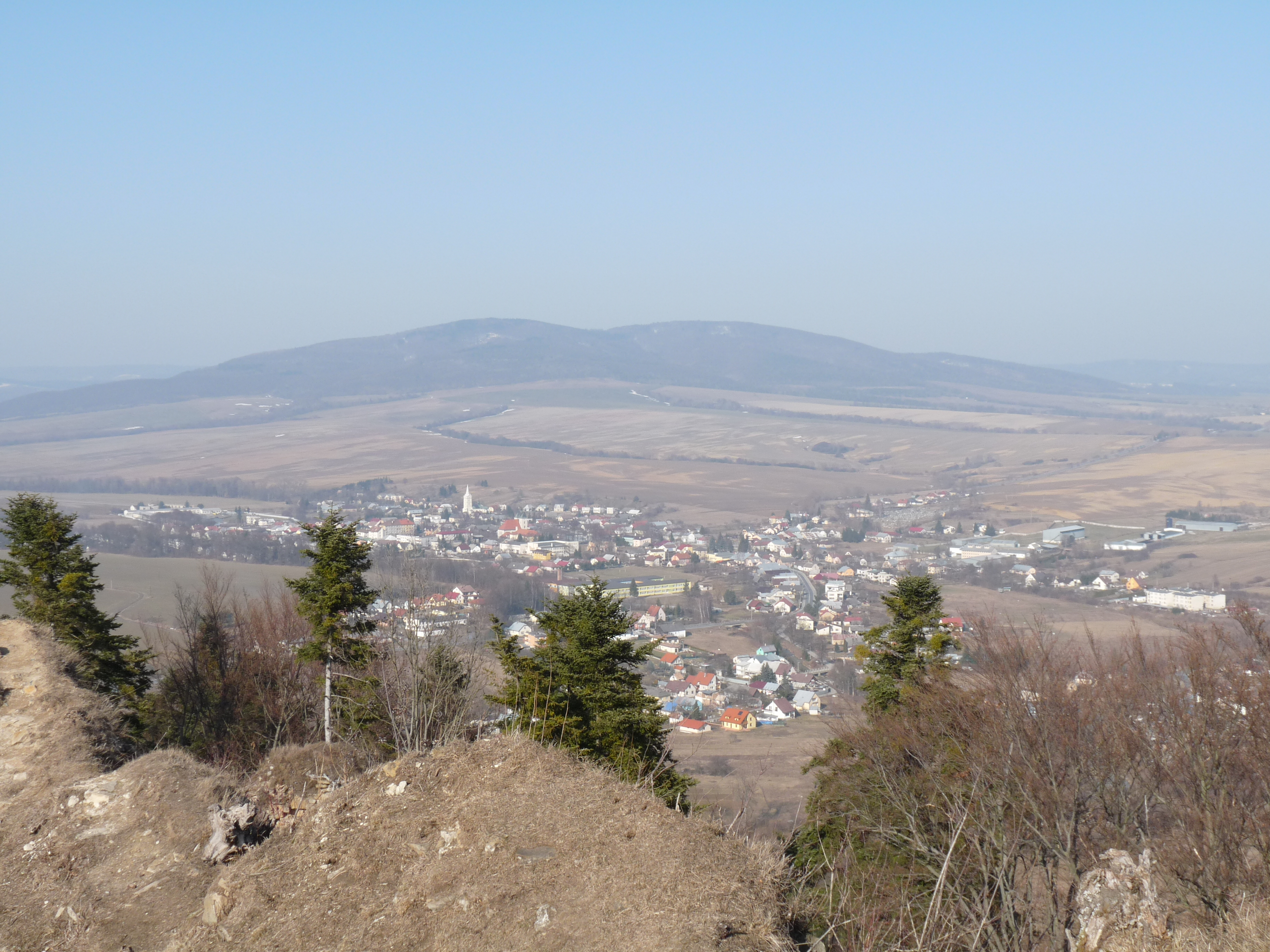
A view of the village of Zborov from the castle (March 2012)

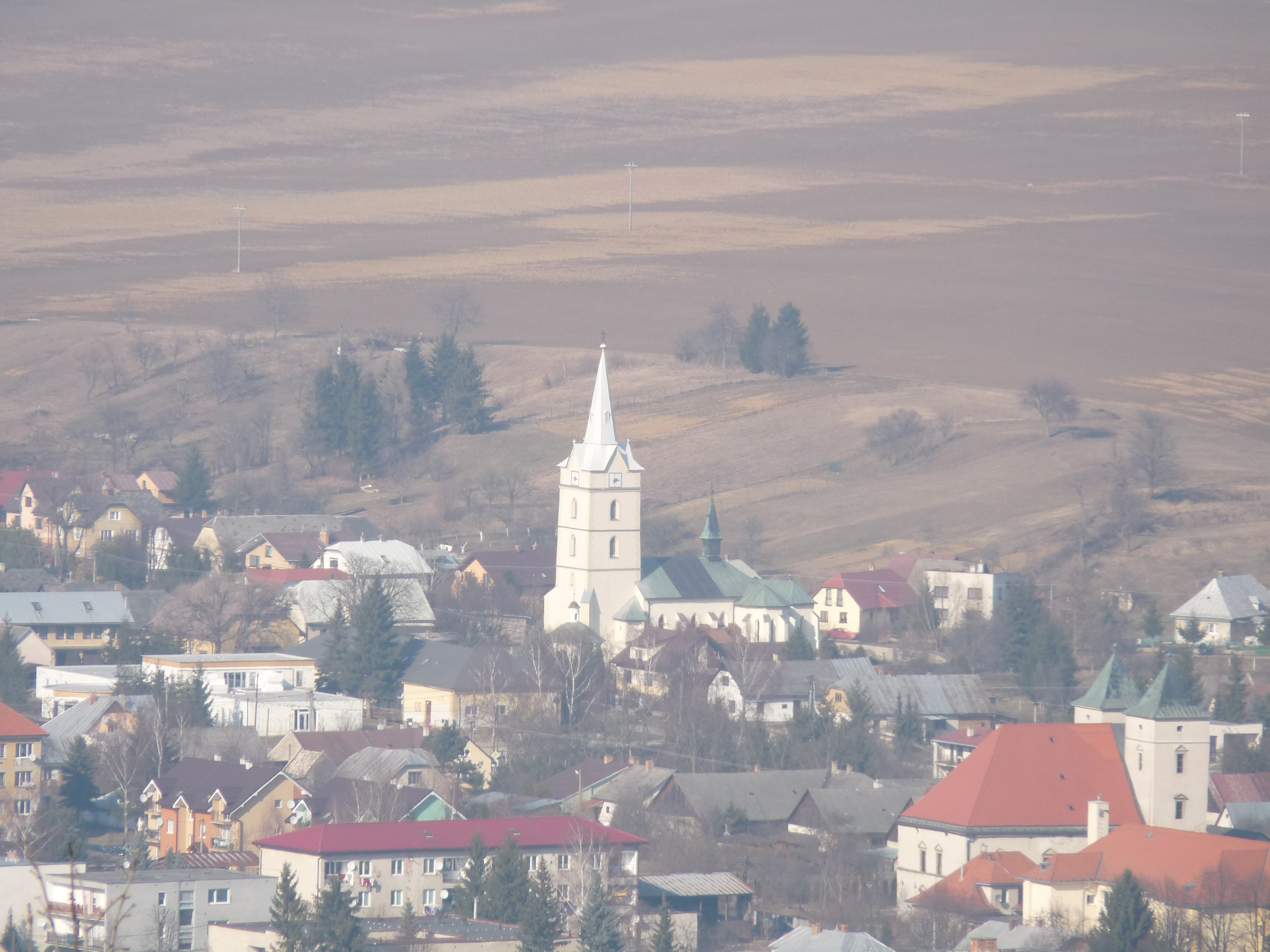
A closer view of the village from the castle, with the Church of Saint Margaret of Antioch seen prominently (March 2012)
