= Zborov, Bardejov District =

Zborov
- Municipality
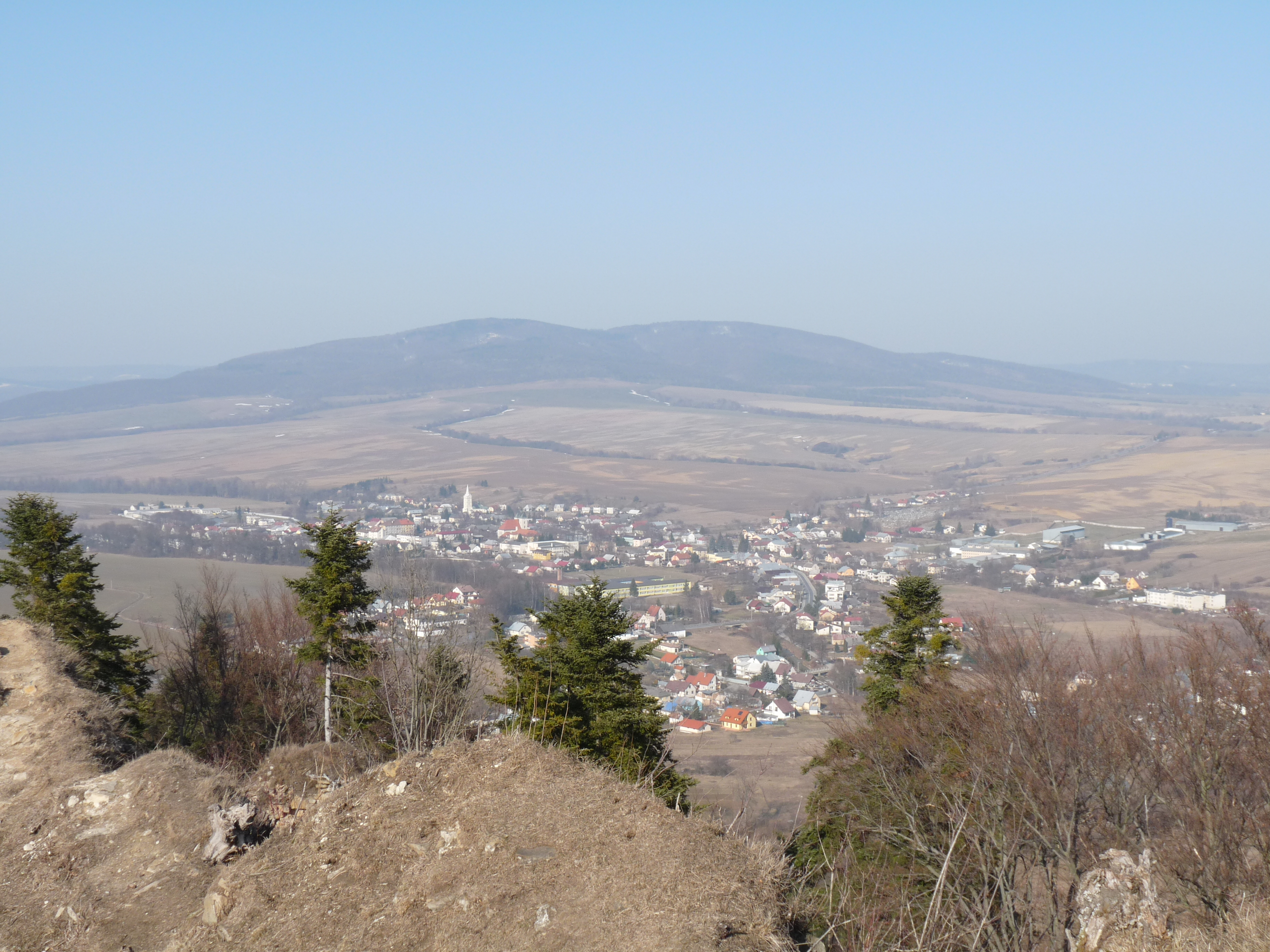
- View of the village from Zborov Castle (2012)

- Flag

- Location of Zborov in the Prešov Region Location of Zborov in Slovakia
- Coordinates: 49.37°N 21.31°E
- Country: Slovakia
- Region: Prešov Region
- District: Bardejov District
- First mentioned: 1355

Area
  - Total: 19.82 km^{2} (7.65 sq mi)
- Elevation: 323 m (1,060 ft)

Population (2025)
  - Total: 3,707
- Time zone: UTC+1 (CET)
  - Summer (DST): UTC+2 (CEST)
- Postal code: 863 3
- Area code: +421 54
- Vehicle registration plate (until 2022): BJ

Zborov (Hungarian: Zboró) is a village and municipality in Bardejov District in the Prešov Region of north-east Slovakia.

== General ==
The village is located in northeastern Slovakia, 10 km from the Polish border. There are marked walking trails to Zborov Castle and the surrounding hills. The old unused two steepled church, in the center of the village is currently being rebuilt, the keys are kept in the tourist information centre just outside the gate, the manager (speaks English) can let you inside to climb the towers. Farming, forestry and tourism are the major industries.

== History ==
In historical records the village was first mentioned in 1355. The local Zborov Castle was built in the 16th century to protect the trade route from the east and encourage population of the surrounding region.

During the 16th and 17th centuries the village was a property of the Ostrogski family, who built a memorial chapel there.

The village was the site of fighting in 1915 and suffered extensive damage during both the first and second world wars. During World War II the local Jewish population was deported to death camps.

Zborov is the birthplace of rabbi Yeshayah Steiner, founder of the Kerestir (Hasidic dynasty).

== Geography ==
The municipality lies at an altitude of 323 metres (1,060 ft) and covers an area of 19.82 km^{2} (7.65 sq mi) (2025). The region is hilly and heavily forested. Two specially protected areas are nearby, one on the hill around the castle the other on the higher hills across the road.

== Transport ==
Zborov lies on the Bardejov-Svidník road, with bus services to Bardejov (10 km away). A small road also leads north to Poland.

== Population ==
Population statistic (10 years)
Year	1995	2005	2015	2025
Count	2459	2910	3385	3707
Difference		+18.34%	+16.32%	+9.51%

Population statistic
Year	2024	2025
Count	3670	3707
Difference		+1.00%

It has a population of 3707 people (31 December 2025).

=== Ethnicity ===
Census 2021 (1+ %)
Ethnicity	Number	Fraction
Slovak	3304	93.51%
Romani	352	9.96%
Not found out	96	2.71%
Rusyn	49	1.38%
Total	3533	

In year 2021 was 3533 people by ethnicity 3304 as Slovak, 352 as Romani, 96 as Not found out, 49 as Rusyn, 14 as Czech, 13 as Ukrainian, 7 as Hungarian, 5 as Polish, 4 as Italian, 4 as Other, 2 as Irish and 1 as German.

Note on population: The difference values of population numbers in the table "Population statistic" and in the sections "Ethnicity" & "Religion" is caused by the use of various statistical methods.

=== Religion ===
Census 2021 (1+ %)
Religion	Number	Fraction
Roman Catholic Church	3130	88.59%
Greek Catholic Church	137	3.88%
None	87	2.46%
Not found out	86	2.43%
Eastern Orthodox Church	56	1.59%
Total	3533	

In year 2021 was 3533 people by religion 3130 from Roman Catholic Church, 137 from Greek Catholic Church, 87 from None, 86 from Not found out, 56 from Eastern Orthodox Church, 22 from Evangelical Church, 8 from Christian Congregations in Slovakia, 3 from Other, 2 from Jehovah's Witnesses, 1 from Calvinist Church and 1 from Apostolic Church.

== Gallery ==
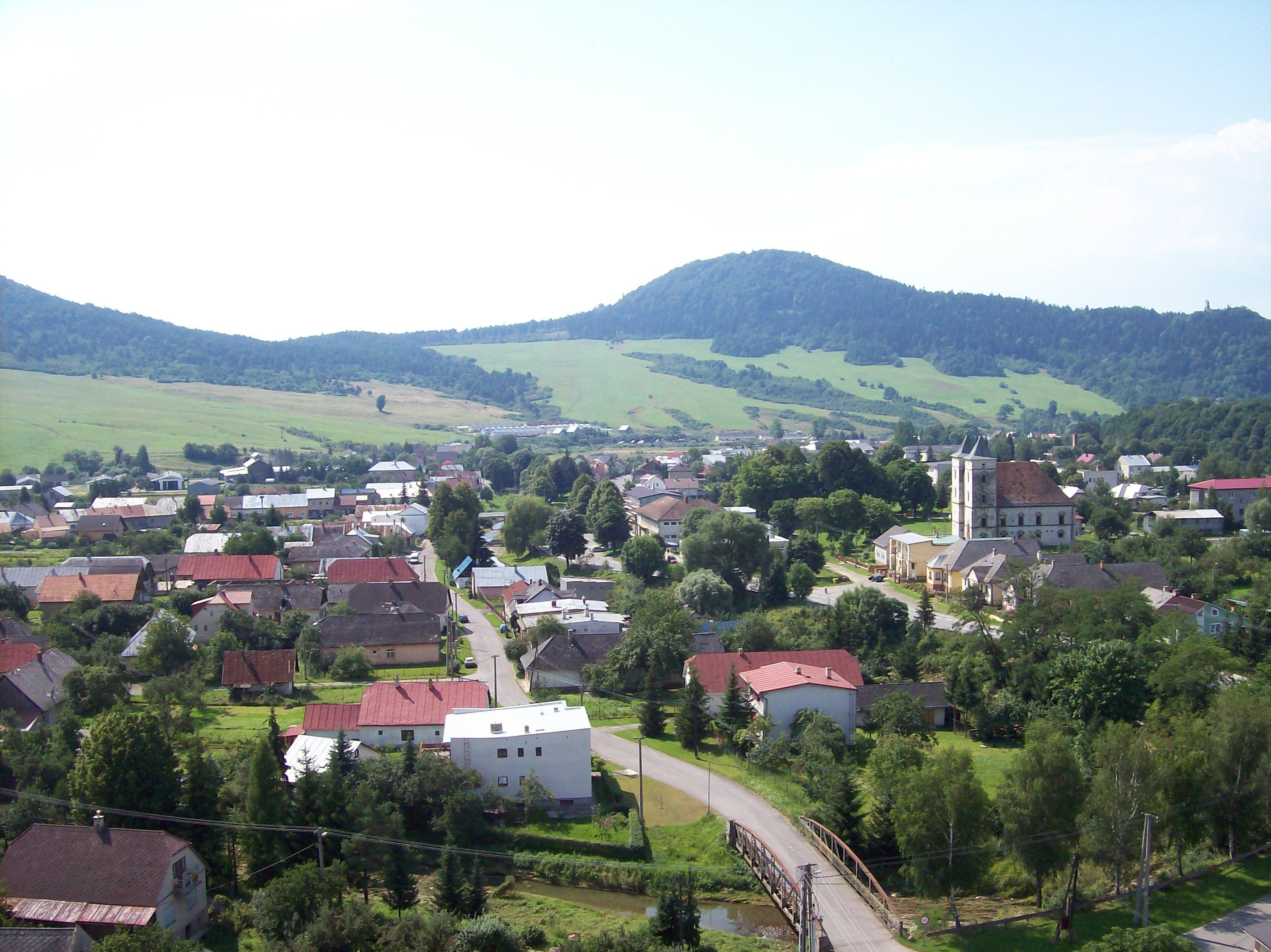
The village streets and surrounding mountains, Church of St. Sophia to the right

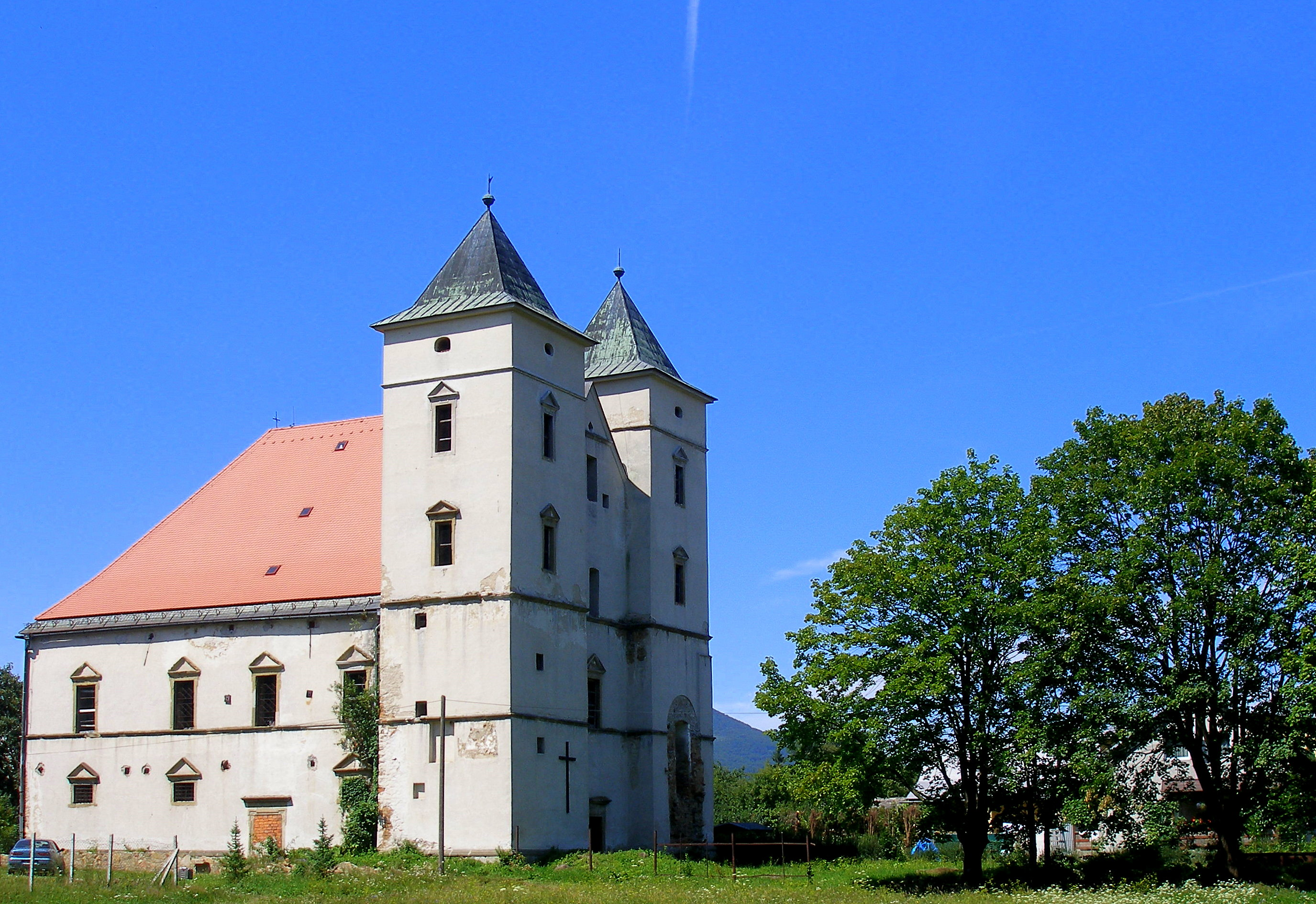
Church of St. Sophia (August 2011)

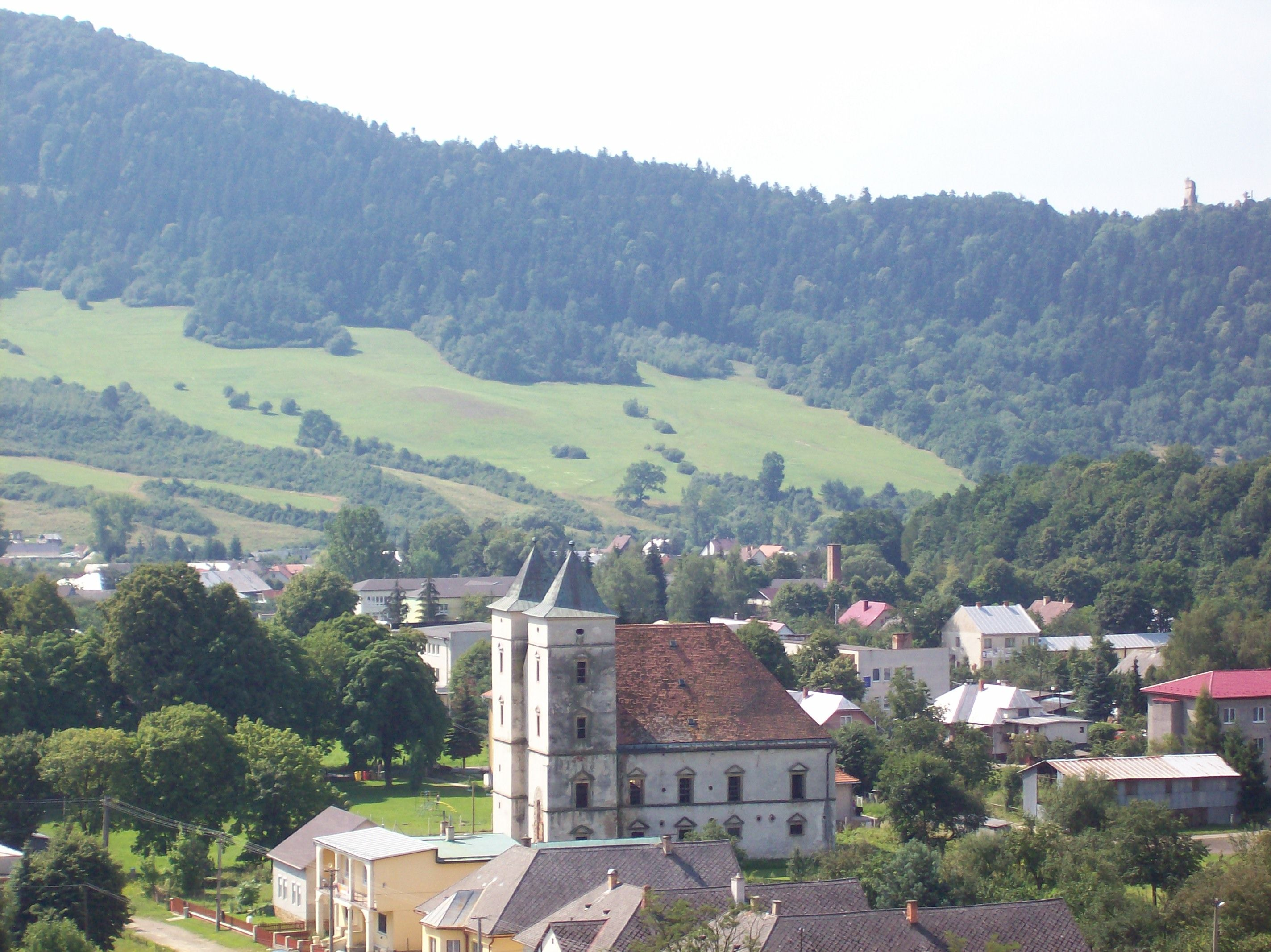
Church of St. Sophia (July 2008)

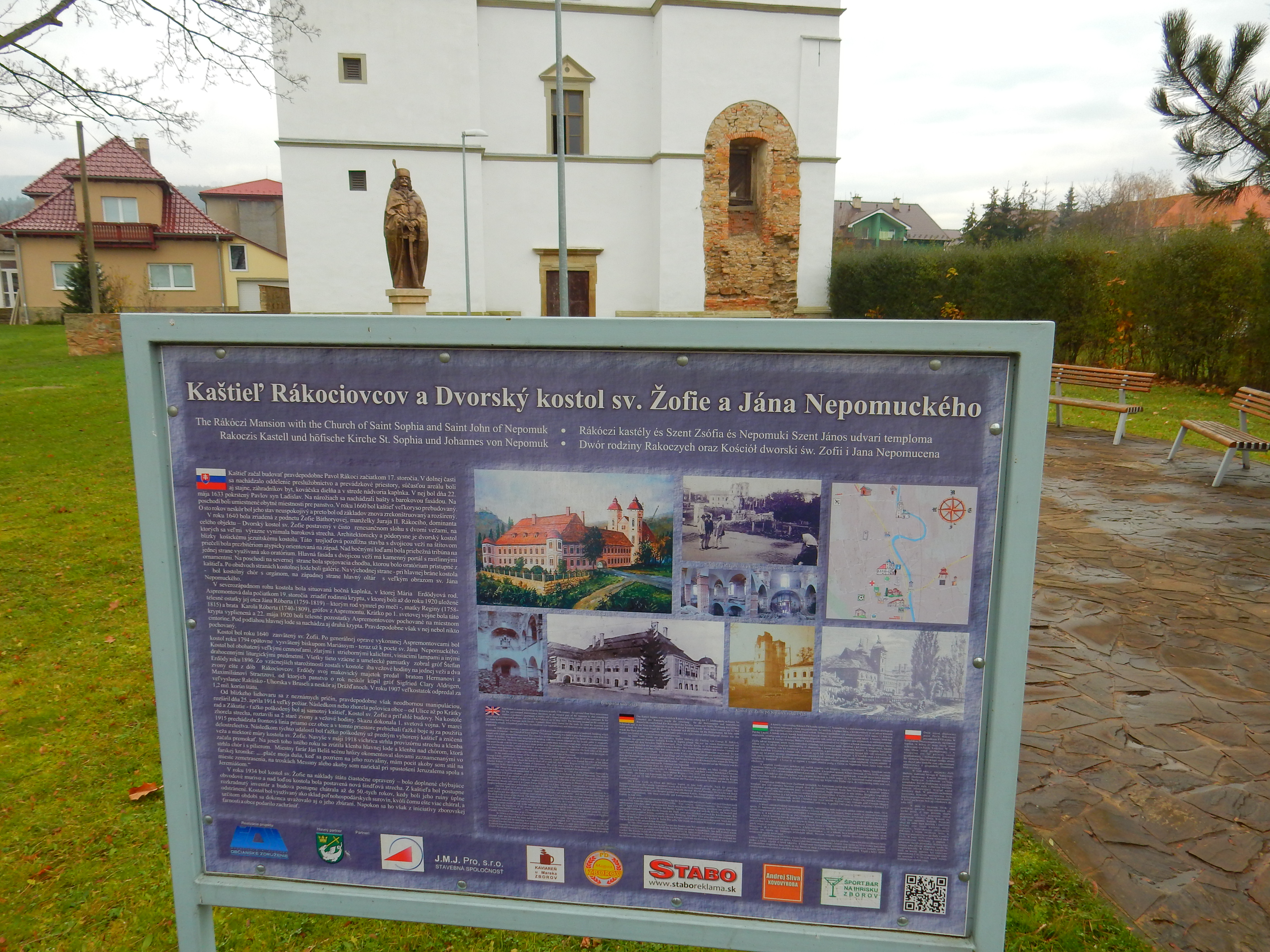
Information sign on the history of the Church of St. Sophia and the Rákóczi family manor house (November 2017)

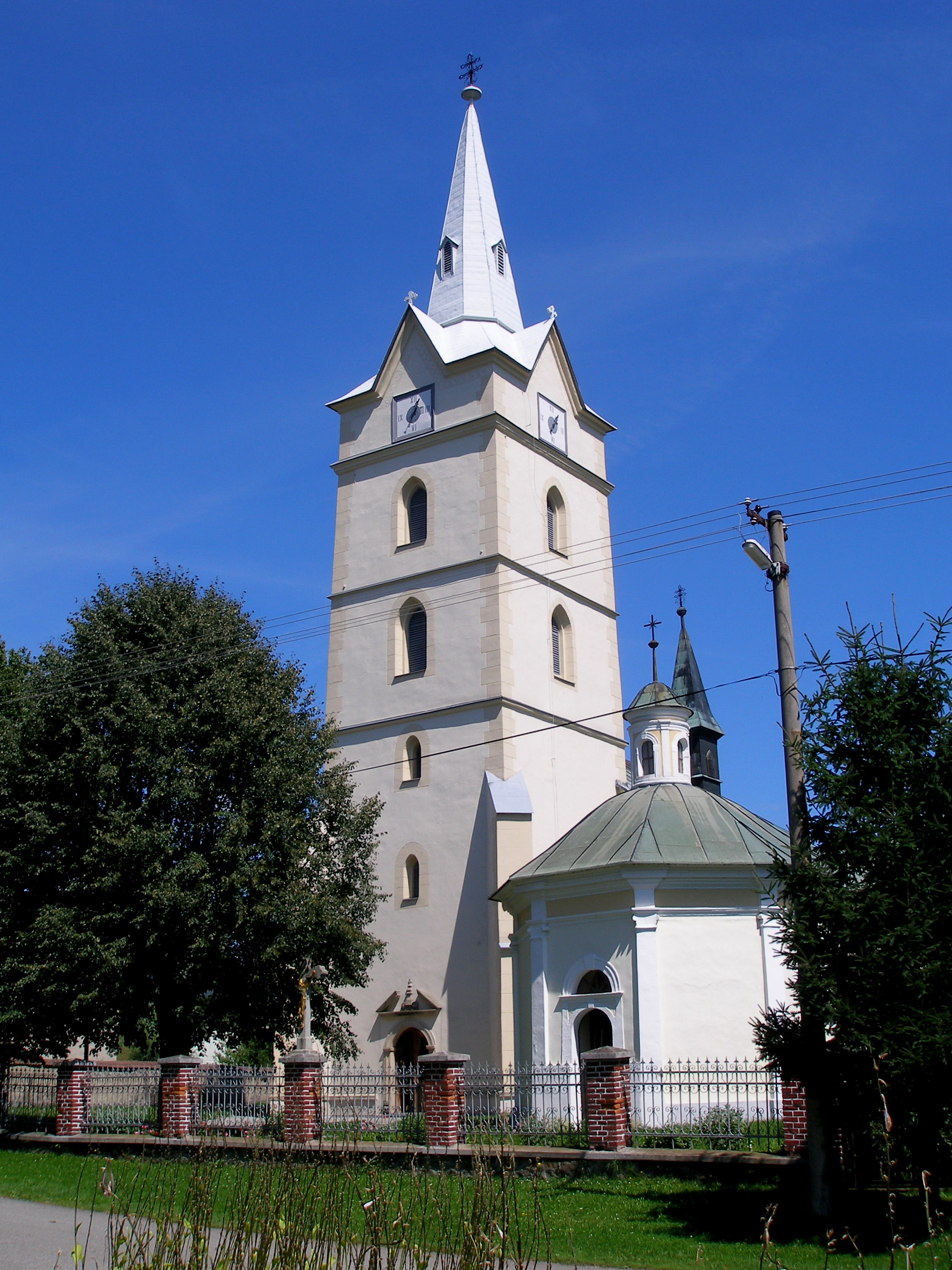
Church of Saint Margaret of Antioch (August 2011)

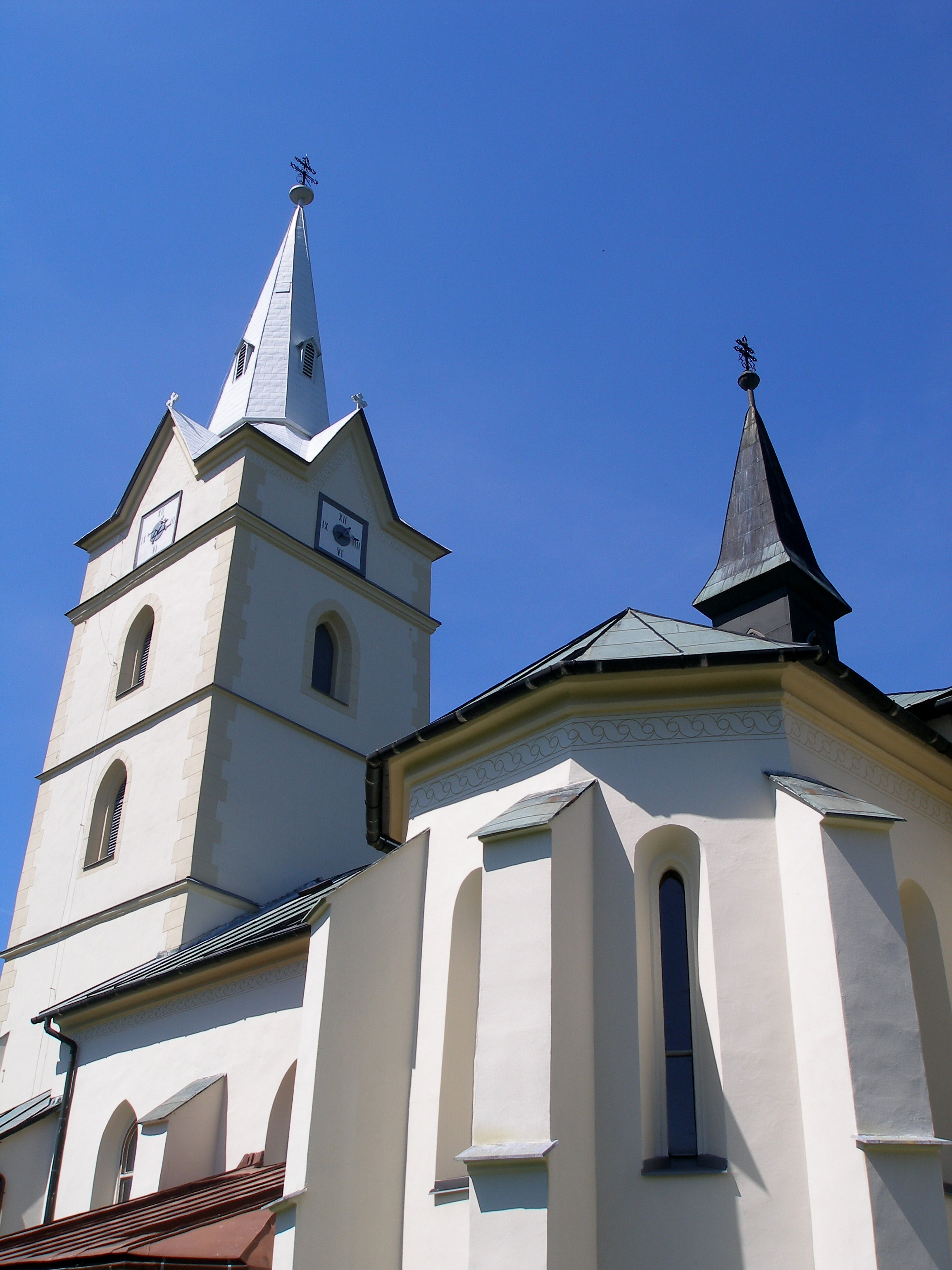
Church of Saint Margaret of Antioch (August 2011)

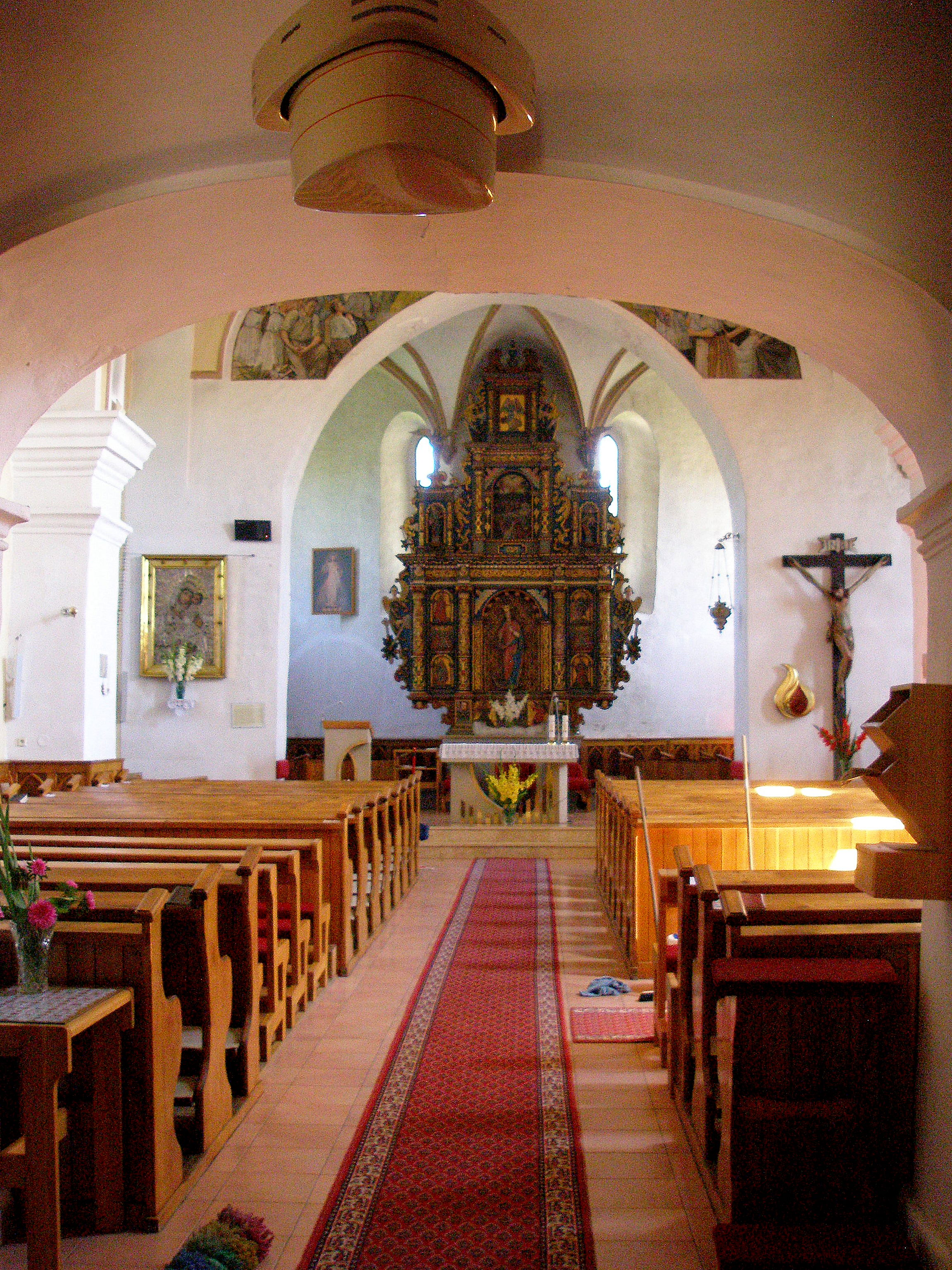
Interior of the Church of Saint Margaret of Antioch (August 2011)

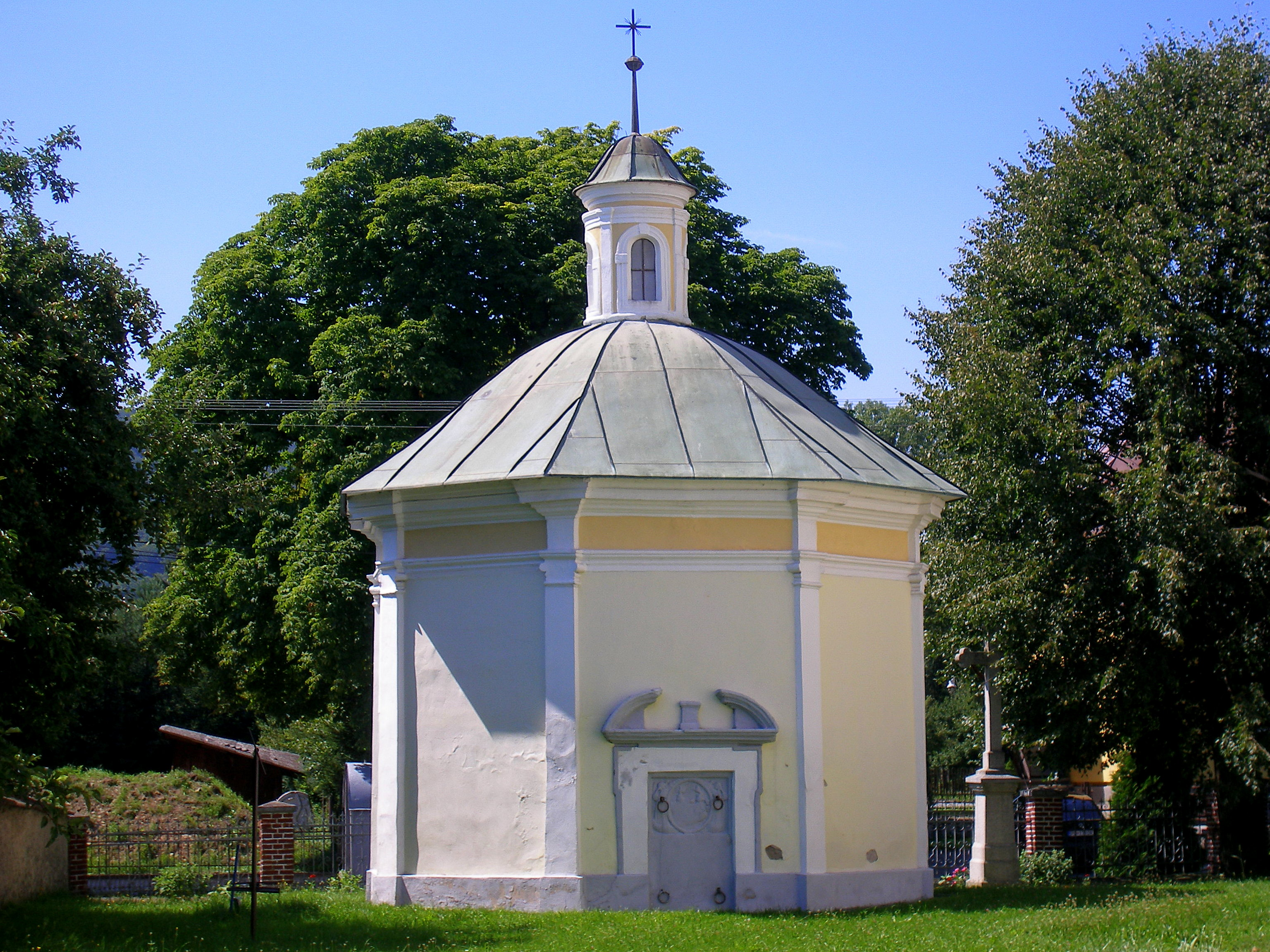
Chapel of Saint Anne in the village (August 2011)

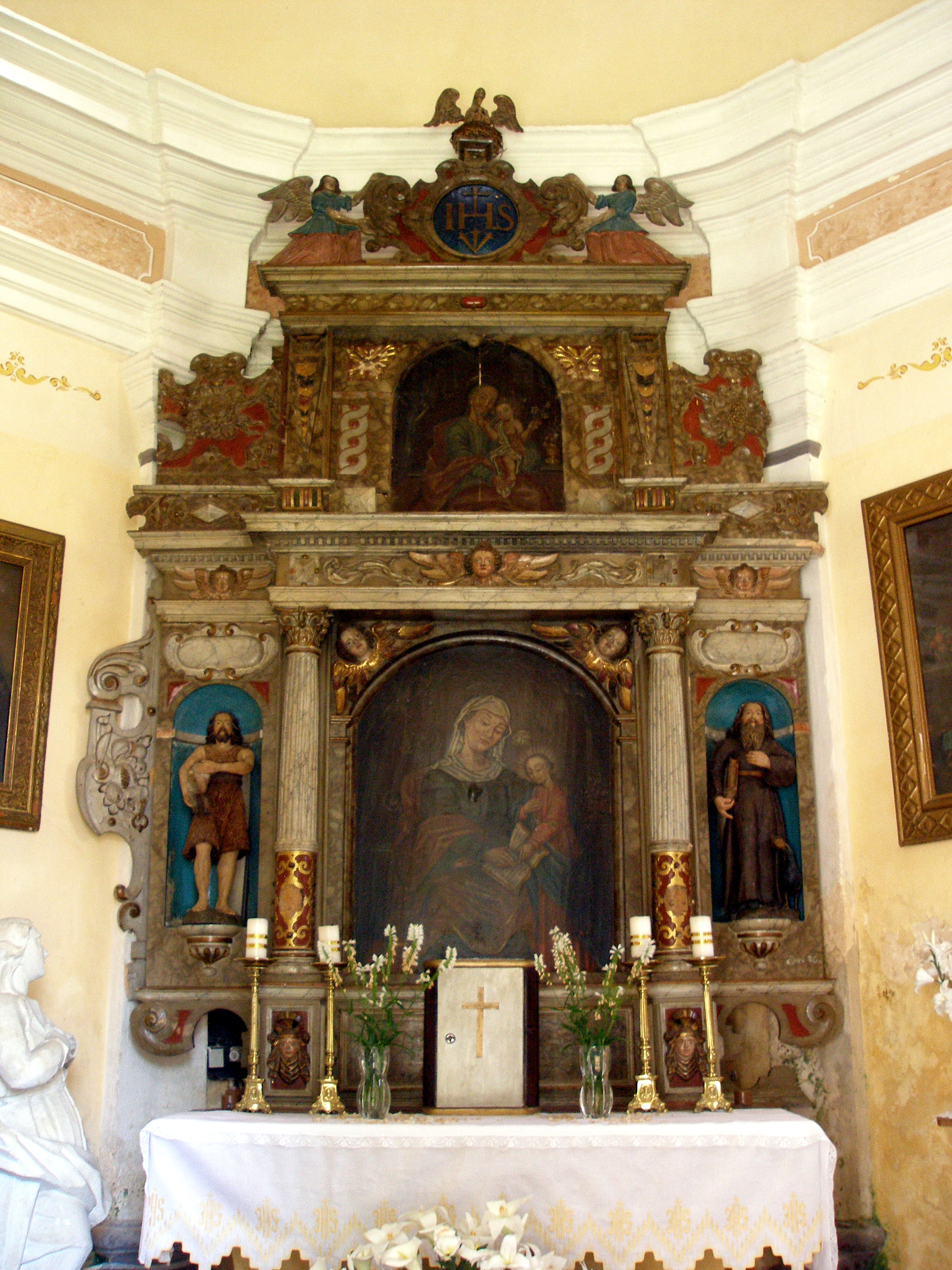
Altar in the Chapel of Saint Anne (August 2011)

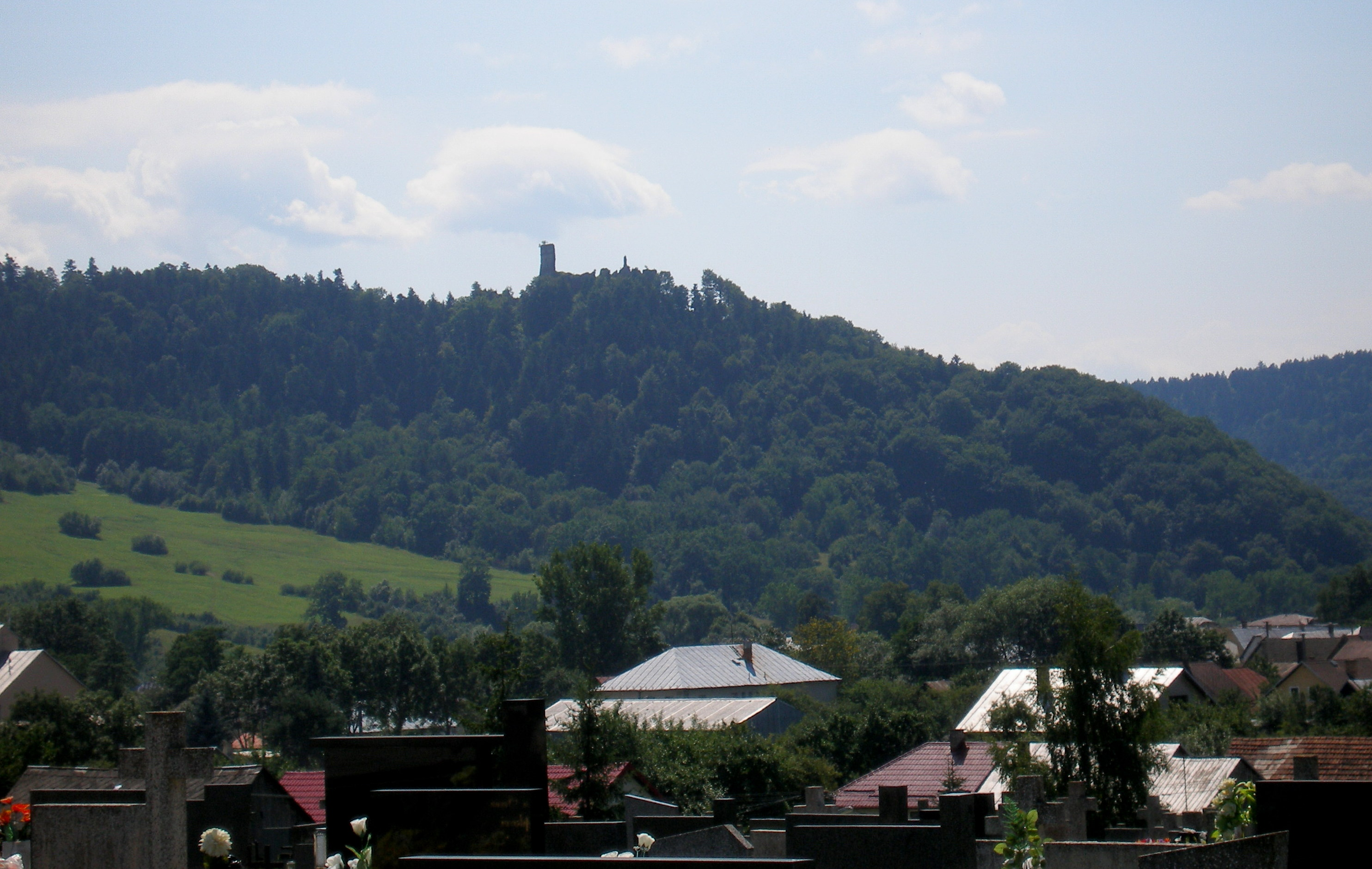
View of the castle hill and Zborov Castle from the village (August 2011)

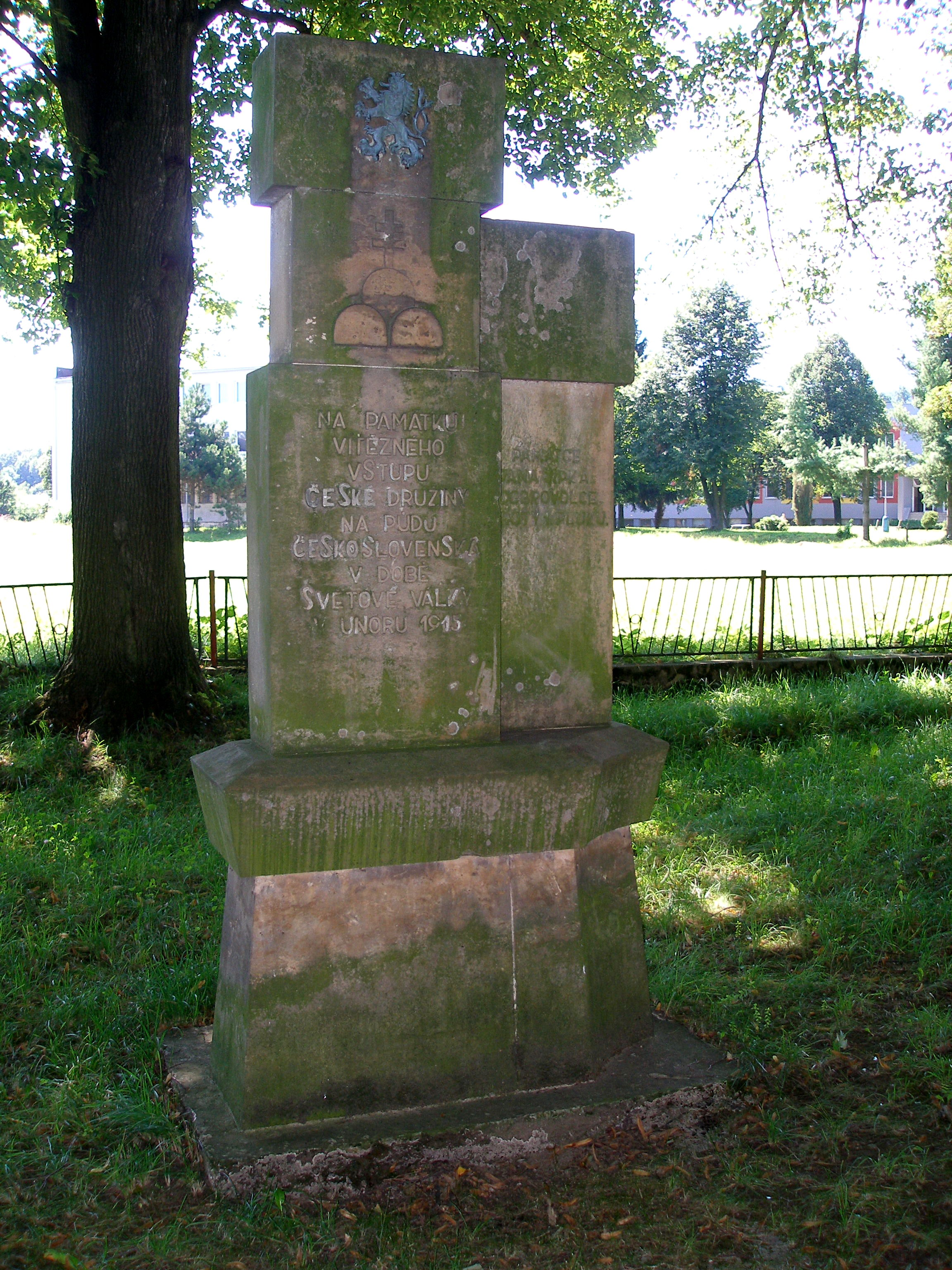
Memorial of the World War I eastern frontline in the village (August 2011)

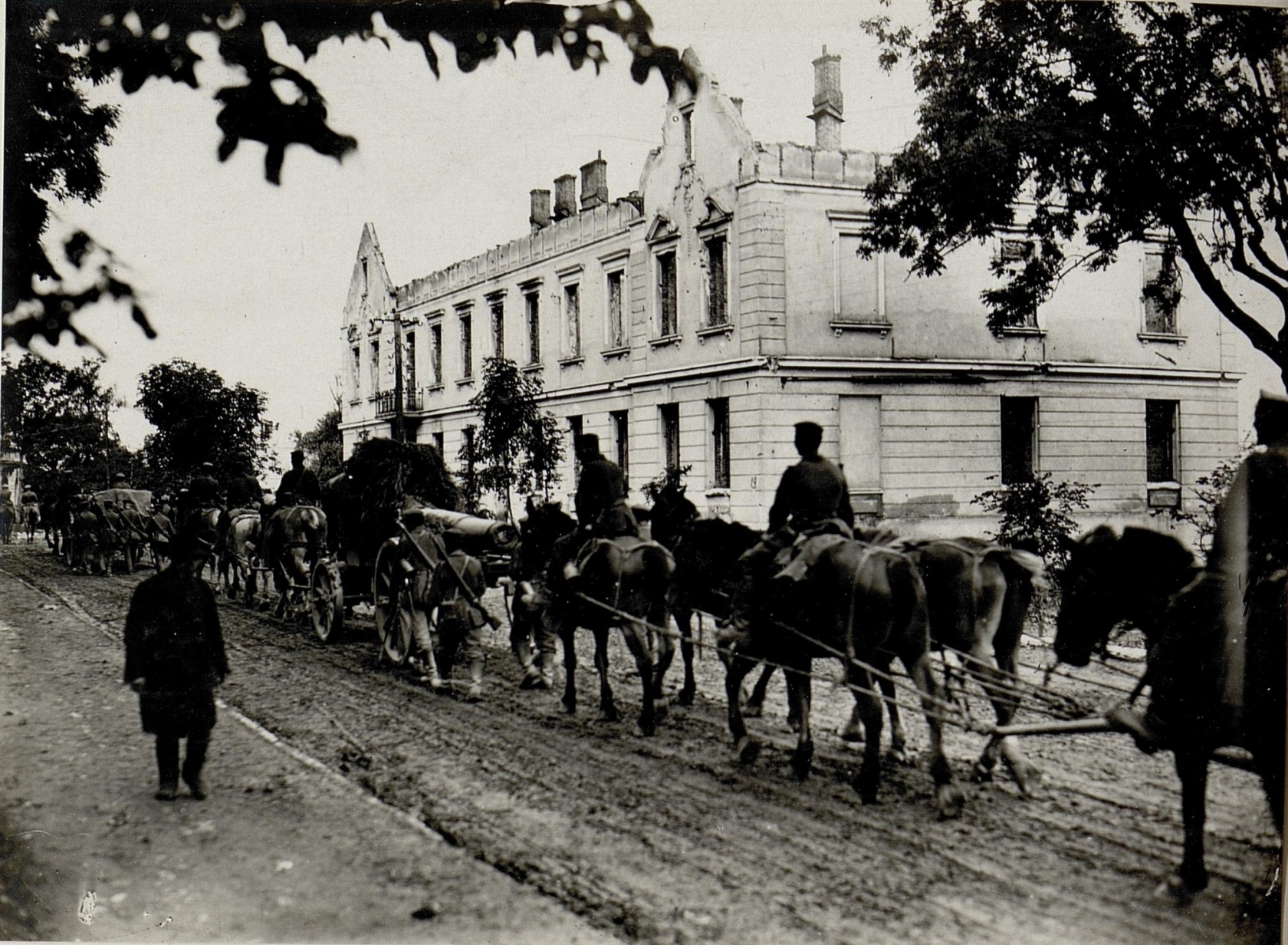
Artillery hauling through the damaged streets of the village during WWI (1915)

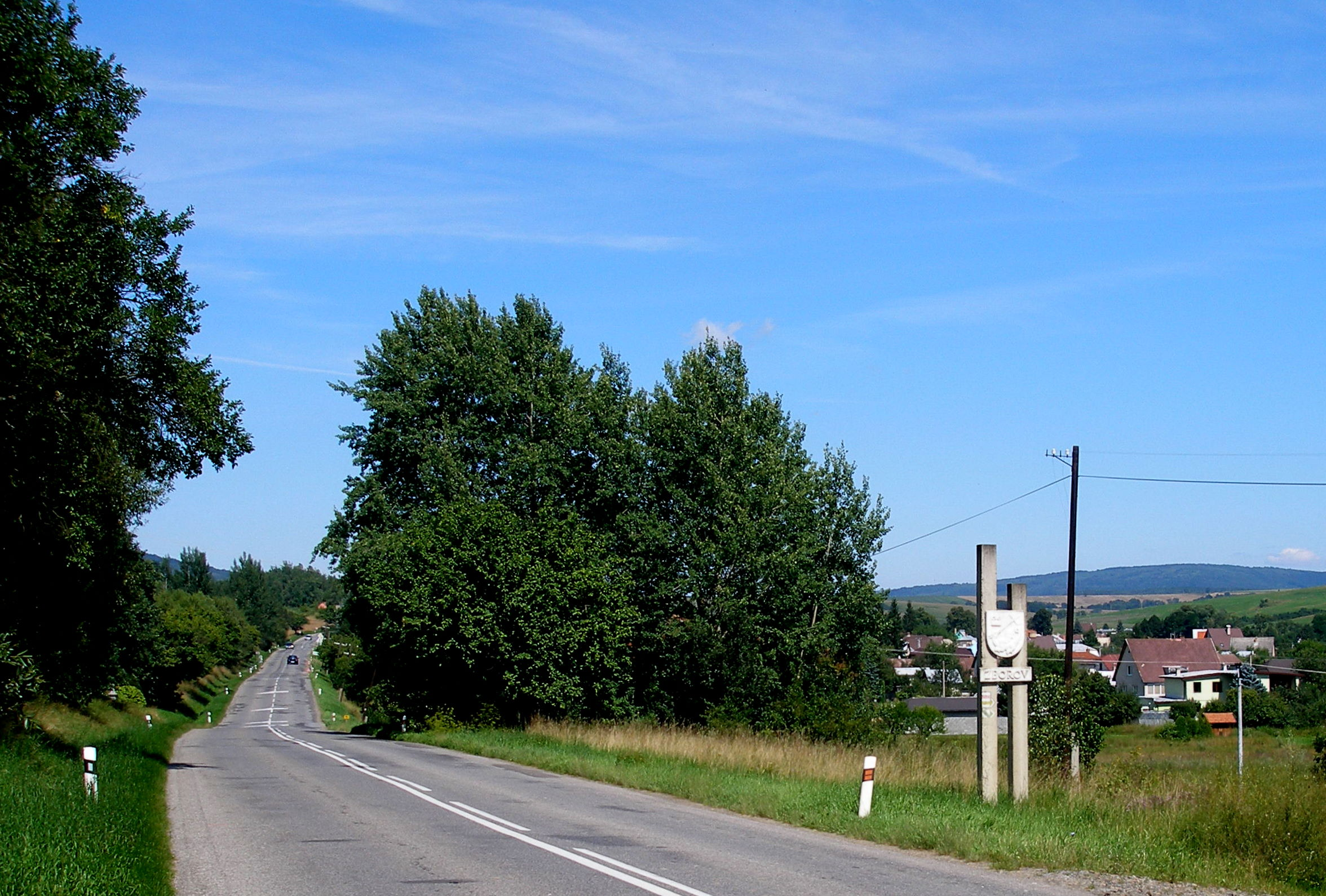
Main road next to the village and village welcome sign (August 2011)

== See also ==
- Zborov Castle
- Yeshayah_Steiner
