= Yeshayah Steiner =

Hungarian rabbi

Rabbi Yeshayah Steiner
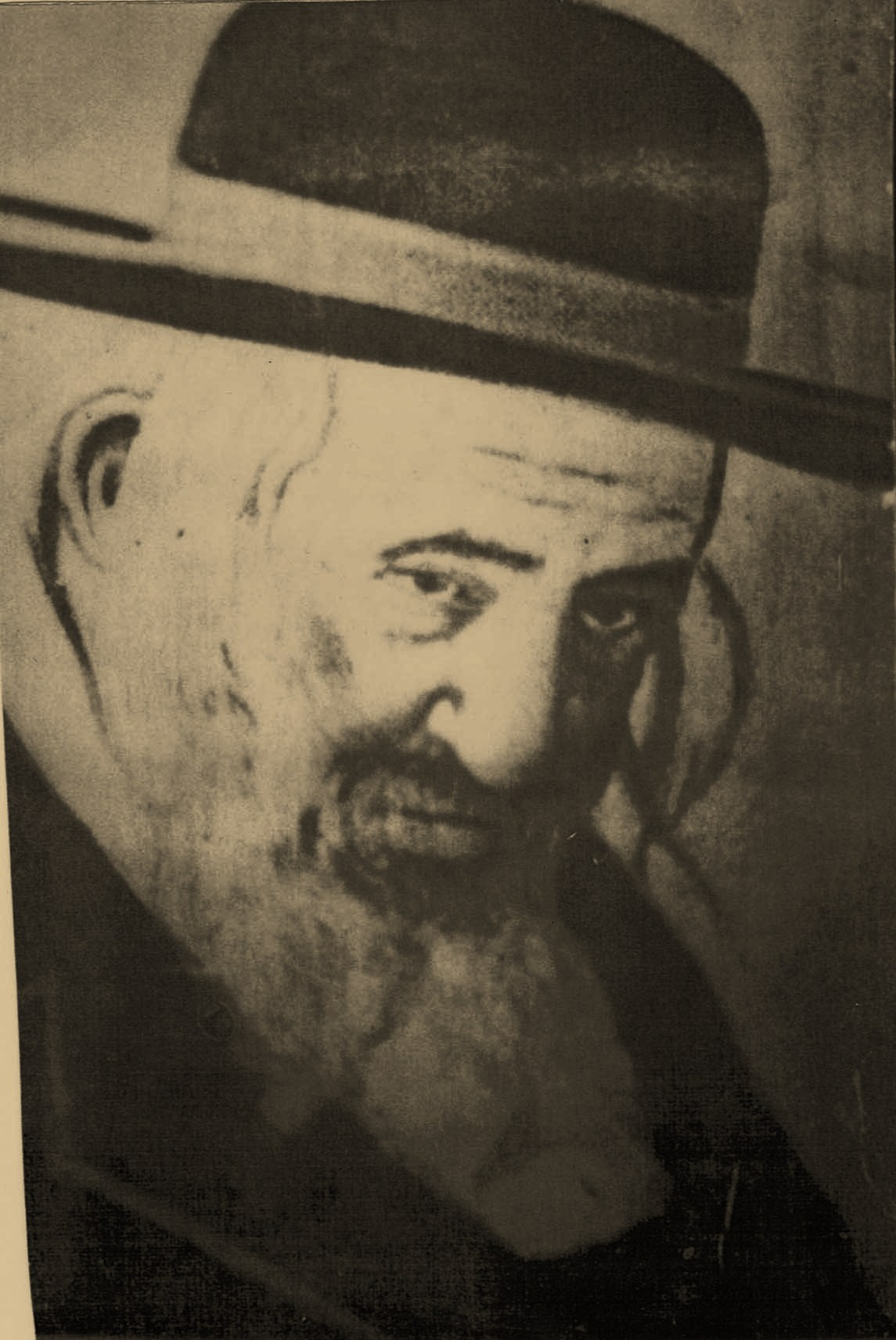
- Title: Reb Shayeleh Kerestirer

Personal life
- Born: 1852 Zborov, Kingdom of Hungary (present-day Slovakia)
- Died: 27 April 1925 (aged 72–73) Bodrogkeresztúr, Kingdom of Hungary
- Buried: Bodrogkeresztúr
- Spouse: Sarah
- Parents: Rabbi Moshe Steiner (father); Hentcha Miryam Steiner (mother)
- Dynasty: Kerestir

Religious life
- Religion: Judaism

Jewish leader
- Successor: Rabbi Avrohom Steiner
- Yahrtzeit: 3rd of Iyar
- Dynasty: Kerestir

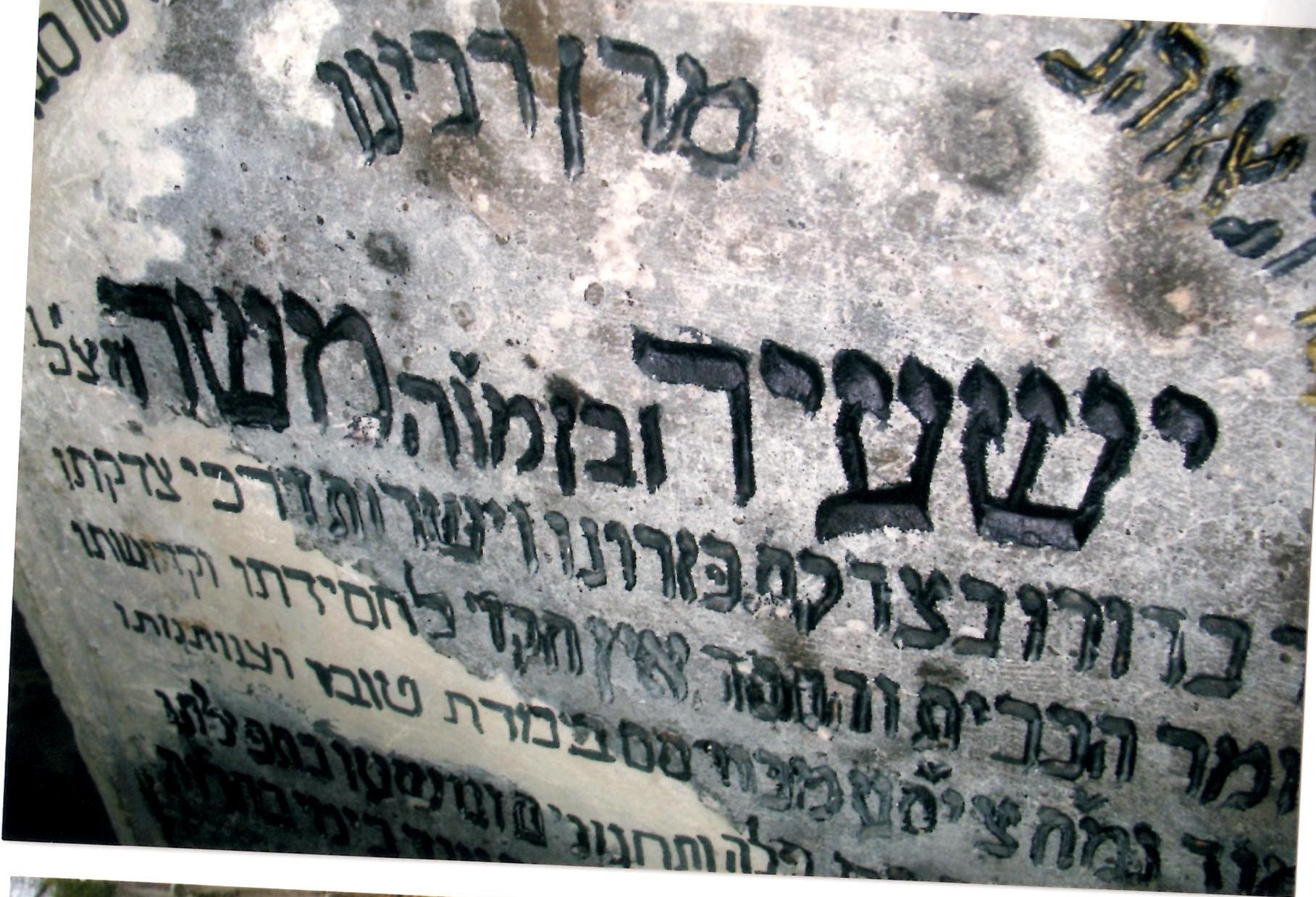
The grave of Rabbi Yeshaya Steiner

Yeshaya Steiner (Yiddish: ישעיה שטיינער), known as Reb Shaya'la of Kerestir (Kerestirer) (Yiddish: ר' ישעיה'לה קערעסטירער) (1851 – 27 April 1925), was a Rebbe in the town of Bodrogkeresztúr (Kerestir) near Miskolc in Hungary.

== Biography ==
Rabbi Yeshayah Steiner was born in 1851 to Rabbi Moshe and Hentsha Miriam Steiner in the village of Zboró, Kingdom of Hungary (today Zborov, Slovakia), near Bártfa (today Bardejov, Slovakia). When he was 3 years old, his father died. At the age of 12, his mother sent him to study with Rabbi Tzvi Hirsh of Liska, the author of Ach Pri Tevua, who later appointed him as his aide (Gabbai). When Tzvi Hirsh died and his son-in-law Rabbi Chaim Friedlander — author of Tal Chaim— succeeded him, Steiner started travelling to visit Rabbi Chaim Halberstam of Sanz. After the death of Rabbi Chaim of Sanz, he became a disciple of Rabbi Mordechai Leifer. Rabbi Mordechai Leifer suggested that he move to the town of Bodrogkeresztúr (Yiddish: Kerestir).

In Bodrogkeresztúr, Steiner became a Hasidic Rebbe and became known as a miracle worker, and tens of thousands of Hasidim came to his court.

Steiner was known for his large-scale hospitality. In recent years, hospitality projects have developed in his town of Bodrogkeresztúr.

Rabbi Yeshaya Steiner of Kerestir's image is used as an amulet by some Jews, who believe that it wards away mice.

His children were Rabbi Avraham; Kreintsheh, wife of Rabbi Shmuel Gross Rabbi of Nagykároly (Yiddish: Krula, today Carei, Romania); Rivka Feiga, wife of Rabbi Reuven Chaim Klein, Rabbi of Szinna (today Snina, Slovakia); and Rachel, wife of Rabbi Yisrael Avraham Alter Landa Rabbi of Edelény (Edelin) (author of Beith Yisrael). In 1925 Rabbi Steiner was succeeded by his son Avraham.

== Descendants ==
- Rabbi Yissachar Dov Rubin, Grand Rabbi of Kerestir in Borough Park, Brooklyn
- Rabbi Naftali Grosz (1901–1987) Grand Rabbi of Kerestir-Berbesht, Son-in-Law of Rabbi Avraham Steiner. Rabbi Naftali Grosz married the granddaughter of Yeshaya Steiner, Margit Steiner. During her lifetime she was beloved by many in the community as the heir of Rabbi Yeshaya Steiner spiritual legacy
- Brooklyn New York, Israel, Miami Beach. After Grosz died in 1988, his son, Rabbi Rafael Grosz, (also known as Rabbi Armin Grosz), became the new Kerestir Rebbe in Miami Beach.
- Rabbi Yeshaya Gross, eldest son of Rabbi Naftali Grosz, of Williamsburg, Brooklyn – Grand Rabbi of Kerestir-Berbesht, Brooklyn NY, Desert Hot Springs California.

== Kerestir Dynasty ==
- Rebbe Yeshayah Steiner (1852–1925)
  - Rebbe Avrohom Steiner (1883–1927), son of Rebbe Yeshaya (Rebbe from 1925 to 1927)
  - Rabbi Shmuel Gross, son-in-law of Rebbe Yeshaya
  - Rabbi Reuven Chaim Klein, son-in-law of Rebbe Yeshaya
  - Rabbi Yisroel Avrohom Alter Landa, son-in-law of Rebbe Yeshaya
    - Rebbe Meir Yosef Rubin of Kerestir, son-in-law of Rebbe Avrohom
    - Rebbe Naftoli Gross of Debrecen (died 1988), brother of Rabbi Yeshaya's son-in-law Rabbi Shmuel and son-in-law of Rebbe Avrohom
      - Rebbe Rafael Gross (1928–2007) – Kerestir Rebbe of Miami Beach, Florida, son of Rebbe Naftoli
      - Rebbe Chananyah Gross – Kerestir Rebbe of Woodridge, NY, son of Rebbe Rafael
        - Rabbi Noach Shapiro Shlita (1995-present) - Mashgiach and Maggid Shuir at Reits (grandson of Rebbe Rafael Gross)
      - Rebbe Yeshaya Grosz – (died on 2nd AdarI 5776) Kerestir-Berbesht Rebbe of Williamsburg, Brooklyn, NY, son of Rebbe Naftoli
        - Rabbi Reuven Grosz (the former Rabbi of Karlsbad, disciple and adopted ben bayis of Rabbi Yeshaya Grosz) – Brachfeld, E. Israel
      - Rabbi Yoishua Moishe Baruch of Woodmere, son of Rebbe Naftali
      - Rebbi Alter Krausz – present Kerestir Rebbe in Monsey, NY, USA.
      - Rabbi Shmuel David Krausz, grandchild of Rabbi Yisroel Avrohom.
        - Rabbi Mayer Yosef Rubin, son of Rabbi Mendel Monroe, NY, USA Rabbi in Kerestir Since 1991
