= List of people from Union City, New Jersey =

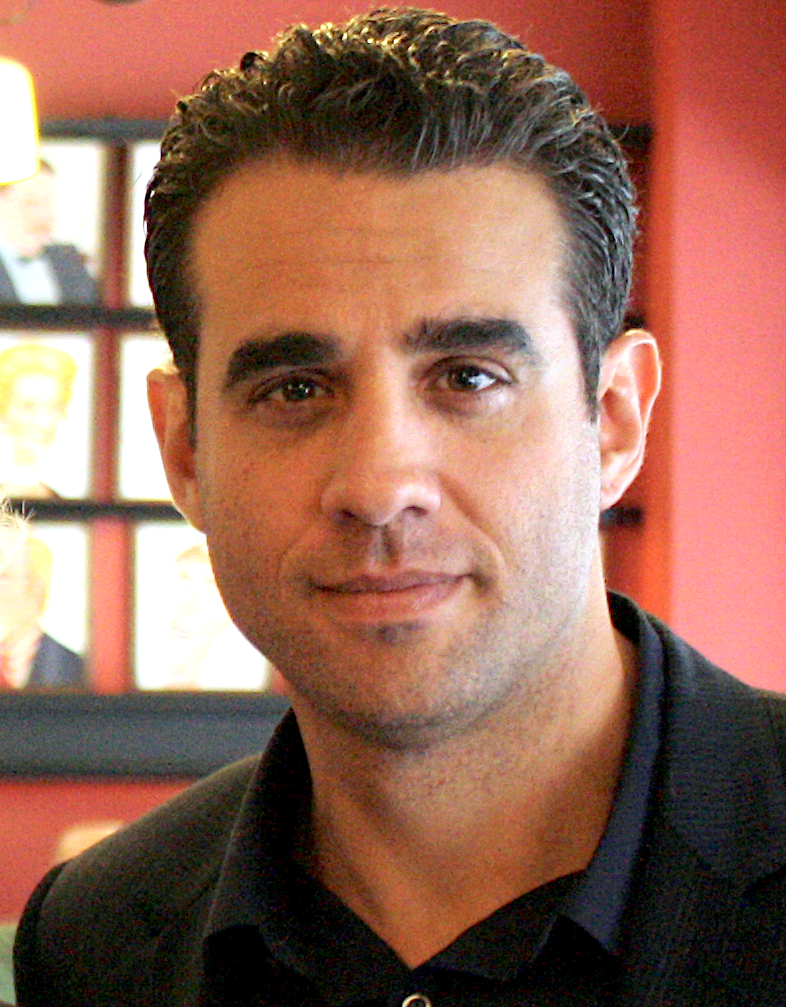
Actor Bobby Cannavale is a multiple Tony Award nominee.

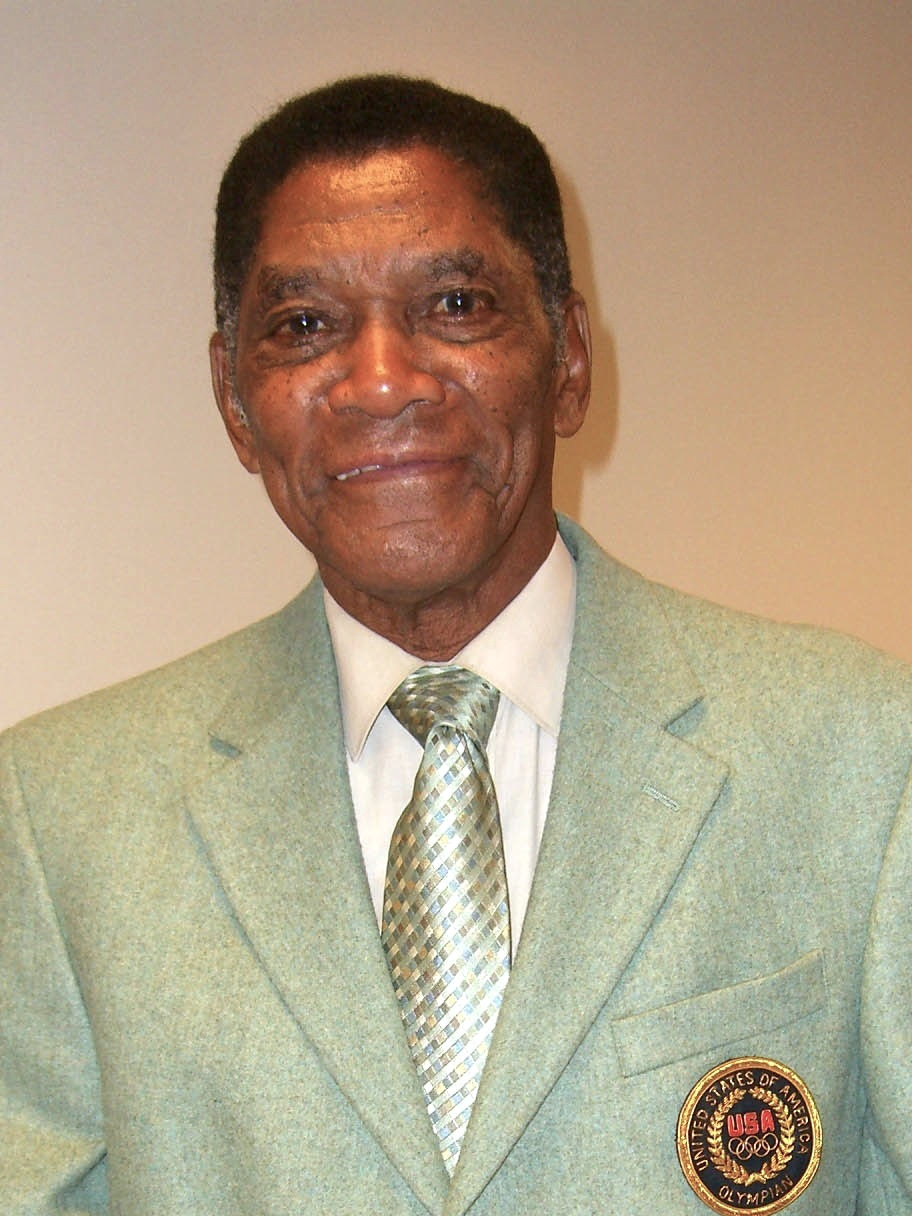
Otis Davis is a winner of two gold medals for record-breaking performances in at the 1960 Summer Olympics.

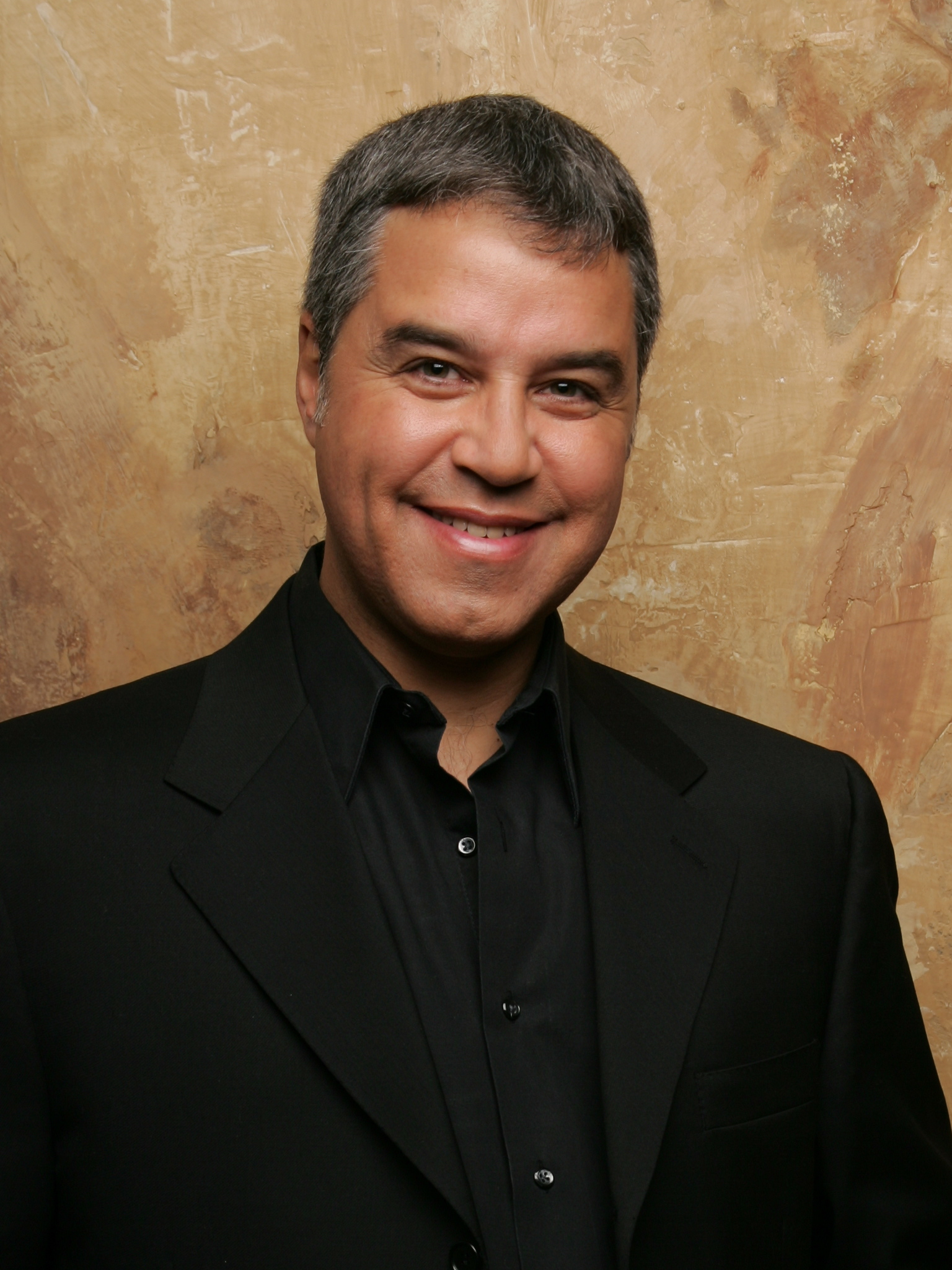
In addition to being Union City's Commissioner of Public Affairs, Lucio Fernandez is also an actor, dancer, playwright, and filmmaker.

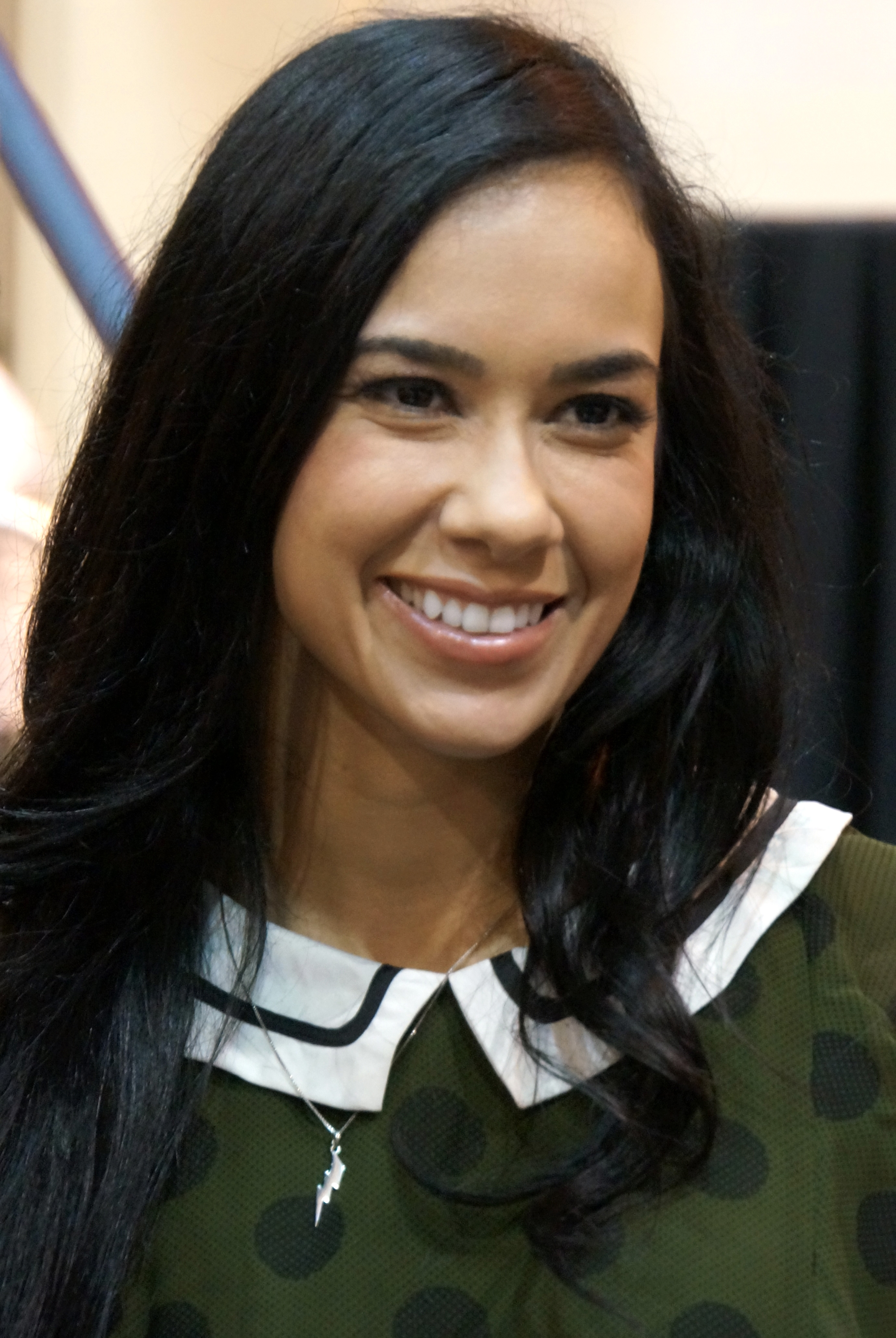
AJ Lee, an author, and a former wrestler in WWE as a record 3x WWE Divas Champion.

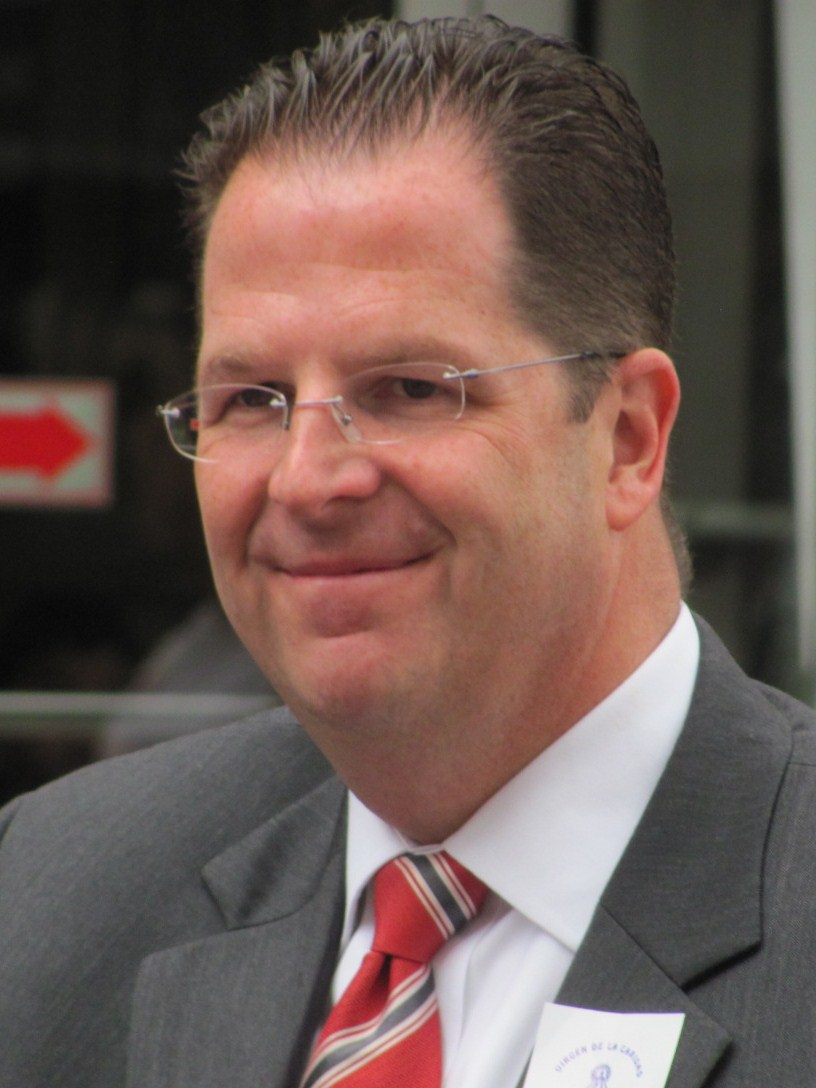
Brian P. Stack has been Mayor of Union City since 2000.

The following is a list of notable people from Union City, New Jersey. (B) denotes that the person was born there, though births prior to 1925 would have been in West Hoboken or Union Hill which merged in 1925 to form Union City, as noted in some of these entries.

- Akon (born 1973), rapper and R&B singer
- Charles Avedisian (1917–1983), football player who played in the NFL for the New York Giants(B)
- Andy Bakjian (1914−1986), Hall of Fame Track and Field official and author(B)
- Al Bansavage (1938–2003), American football linebacker who played in the American Football League for the Los Angeles Chargers (1960) * Oakland Raiders
- Fred Barakat (1939−2010), college basketball coach
- José Miguel Battle Sr. (1929–2007), former Bay of Pigs Invasion operative who became known as "Godfather of the Cuban mafia"
- Harold Bell (1919–2009), creator of Woodsy Owl(B)
- Ben Blank (1921–2009), television graphics innovator.
- Steve Bula, first-season cast member on the MTV reality television series From G's to Gents
- James E. Buttersworth (1817–1894), British maritime painter
- Bobby Cannavale (born 1971), actor known for his roles on Ally McBeal, Third Watch, and Will & Grace
- Helen Castillo, fashion designer known as one of the cast members on season 12 of the reality television series Project Runway. Castillo was born and raised in Weehawken before later moving to Union City
- Rene Paul Chambellan (1893–1955), architectural sculptor, known for his work in the Art Deco and Greco Deco styles
- Gordon Chiesa, basketball coach, who was assistant coach for the Utah Jazz for 16 seasons from 1989 to 1990 to 2004–2005
- Hallice Cooke (born 1995), guard for Nevada Wolf Pack basketball team
- Norman Cousins (1915–1990), author and peace advocate(B)
- Dominick V. Daniels (1908–1987), represented New Jersey's 14th congressional district from 1959 to 1977
- Ronald Dario (1937–2004), politician who represented the 33rd Legislative District in the New Jersey General Assembly from 1984 to 1986
- Otis Davis (1932–2024), Olympic track and field athlete who won two gold medals in the 400-meter dash and the 4 × 400 meters relay at 1960 Summer Olympics, setting a world record in the former event
- Louis Del Grande (born 1943), television writer and actor, best known for starring in the Canadian mystery/comedy series Seeing Things
- Vincent John Dellay (1907–1999), represented New Jersey's 14th congressional district in the United States House of Representatives from 1957 to 1959(B)
- Pietro Di Donato (1911–1992), Italian American novelist, and author of Christ in Concrete(B)
- Harvey B. Dodworth (1822–1891), bandmaster
- Harry Donovan (1926–2025), professional basketball player who played for the New York Knicks
- Gary T. Erbe (born 1944), self-taught oil painter, best known for his Trompe-l'œils(B)
- Henry Escalante, pop musician, and one of the 15 finalists from the 2007 season of the MTV reality show Making Menudo
- Lucio Fernandez Cuban-American politician and entertainer, who works as the Commissioner of Public Affairs in Union City.
- Hank Finkel (born 1942), retired NBA basketball player(B)
- Marshall Flaum (1925–2010), documentary filmmaker
- Margaux Fragoso (1979–2017), memoirist, author of Tiger, Tiger
- Rafael Fraguela (born 1955), member of the New Jersey General Assembly who also served on the Union City Board of Commissioners
- Nick Galis (born 1957), retired Greek basketball player who is a member of the FIBA Hall of Fame and the Naismith Hall of Fame
- Rudy Garcia (born 1964), former Assemblyman and Mayor of Union City
- Anthony Vincent Genovese (born 1932), architect who practiced in the mid to late-twentieth-century New York and New Jersey as a partner in the architectural firm name Genovese & Maddalene
- Shlomo Goldman (1947–2017), Grand Rabbi of the Sanz-Klausenberger community in Union City
- Steven Gonzalez (born 1997), American football guard for the St. Louis Battlehawks of the United Football League
- Yekusiel Yehudah Halberstam (1905–1994), Rebbe of the Klausenberg Hasidic dynasty
- Frank Haubold (1906–1985), Olympic gymnast who won a silver and gold medal in the 1928 Summer Olympics, and who, with his wife, Irma, were the first married couple to compete in the Olympics
- Irma Haubold (1908–1996), Olympic gymnast who competed in the 1936 Summer Olympics, and who, with and her husband, Frank, were the first married couple to compete in the Olympics(B)
- Tom Heinsohn (1934–2020), professional basketball player who was associated with the Boston Celtics of the National Basketball Association for six decades as a player, coach and broadcaster
- Alexis Hernandez, contestant on season 6 of the Food Network's Next Food Network Star
- Harry Houdini (1874–1926) maintained a studio at 19th Street and Manhattan Avenue
- Bob Hugin (born 1954), businessman who was formerly the executive chairman of Celgene
- Antonio Jacobsen (1850–1921), maritime artist known as the "Audubon of Steam Vessels"
- Paul Jappe (1898–1989), NFL player born in Union Hill who played for the New York Giants and Brooklyn Lions(B)
- Joe Jeanette (1879–1958), considered one of the best African American heavyweight boxers of the early 20th Century(B)
- Al Jochim (1902–1980), gymnast who won two silver medals in gymnastics at the 1932 Summer Olympics in Los Angeles
- Vicki Johnson, woman discovered to have perpetrated a hoax in which she fabricated a boy afflicted with AIDS, whose autobiography, A Rock and a Hard Place, fooled people such Armistead Maupin, Mr. Rogers and Oprah Winfrey, and became the basis of Maupin's fictionalized novel, The Night Listener, and the feature film of the same name starring Robin Williams
- Eugene Jolas (1894–1952), writer, translator and literary critic born in Union Hill(B)
- Ivan Paul Kaminow (1930–2013), electrical engineer and scientific researcher(B)
- Ron Karabatsos (1933–2012), police detective and character actor.
- George Keller (1928–2007), scholar of higher education(B)
- A. J. Khubani, founder, president and CEO of Telebrands Corp.
- Randy Klein (born 1949), musician, composer, pianist, author and educator
- Mike Kovaleski (born 1965), former American football linebacker who played in the NFL for the Cleveland Browns(B)
- Gilman Kraft (1926–1999), publisher and former owner of Playbill(B)
- Nicholas LaRocca (1913–1999), politician who served in both houses of the New Jersey Legislature from the 33rd Legislative District(B)
- AJ Lee (born 1987), female professional wrestler, best known for her time in WWE(B)
- Lila Lee (1905–1973), prominent screen actress, primarily a leading lady, of the silent film and early sound film eras(B)
- Ada Lio (born 1974), professional pool player, instructor and health equity professional, who competes on the Women's Professional Billiard Association tour
- Dennis Locorriere (born 1949), singer, and one of the two frontpersons for the Dr. Hook & The Medicine Show(B)
- Luigi Lucioni (1900–1988), painter known for his realistic and precisely-drawn still lifes, landscapes, and portraits. Lucioni's family emigrated from Malnate, Italy in 1911 to New York City, and after moving several more times, settled in 1929 at 403 New York Avenue in Union City
- Ada Lunardoni (1911–2003), artistic gymnast who competed at the 1936 Summer Olympics and placed fifth with the team(B)
- Herb Maack (1917–2007), head coach of the Rhode Island Rams from 1956 through 1960(B)
- John Markert (1929–2011), politician who served as Mayor of Washington Township, Bergen County, New Jersey, before being elected to the New Jersey General Assembly, where he served four terms representing the 39th Legislative District(B)
- John McHugh Sr. (1924–2019), American World War II veteran who participated in the D Day invasion, the Battle of Normandy and the Battle of the Bulge(B)
- Alicia Menendez (born 1983), TV commentator, radio host, and writer, and daughter of Senator Bob Menendez
- Bob Menendez (born 1954), Mayor of Union City from 1986 to 1992, and later a United States Senator
- Rob Menendez (born 1985), U.S. representative for New Jersey's 8th congressional district since 2023
- Ray Mercer (born 1961), Olympic gold medal-winning boxer and heavyweight champion
- W. S. Merwin (1927–2019), Pulitzer Prize-winning poet and United States Poet Laureate. In 2006 the city renamed a street near his former home W.S. Merwin Way.
- Otto Messmer (1892–1983), creator of Felix the Cat(B)
- Ioan Missir (1890−1945), Romanian lawyer, politician and novelist
- Erick Morillo (1971–2020), DJ and music producer, known for producing the 1993 hit "I Like to Move It", which was features in the Madagascar film franchise
- Luis Moro (born 1964), actor, filmmaker and writer, best known for his history making-film Love and Suicide, which made him the first American to break the embargo on Cuba to film a feature there
- William Musto (1917–2006), Mayor of Union City from 1962 to 1970 and from 1974 to 1982
- Michael Noriega (born 1977/1978), lawyer who is a nominee to serve as an associate justice of the Supreme Court of New Jersey
- Oscar Nunez (born 1958), Cuban American actor and comedian who stars in the American TV series The Office
- Mitchell Olson, songwriter and contestant on Survivor: The Australian Outback, the second season of the reality television show Survivor
- Joe Oriolo (1913–1985), writer and cartoon animator who co-created Casper the Friendly Ghost and animated Felix the Cat
- Cliff Osmond (1937–2012), character actor and television screenwriter best known for appearing in films directed by Billy Wilder
- Togo Palazzi (1932–2022), retired NBA basketball player
- Carol-Lynn Parente, executive producer of Sesame Street and winner of seven Emmy Awards for her work on the program
- Nick Piantanida (1932–1966), amateur skydiver who died four months after barely surviving a fall from 57,000 feet, in an unsuccessful attempt to break the world parachute jump record
- Arthur Pinajian (1914–1999), Armenian-American artist and comic book creator, known as the creator of the characters Madame Fatal and Invisible Hood
- Harold Poole (1943–2014), bodybuilder who was crowned as Mr. America 1964, Mr. Universe 1963 and Mr. World
- William Ranney (1813−1857), painter best known for his depictions of Western life, sporting scenery, historical subjects and portraiture
- Carlos Rendo (born 1964), attorney and Republican Party politician who served as mayor of Woodcliff Lake and candidate for Lieutenant Governor
- Dan Resin (1931–2010), actor known as Dr. Beeper in the film Caddyshack, and as the Ty-D-Bol man in toilet cleaner commercials
- Dwayne Sabb (born 1969), football player for the New England Patriots
- Esther Salas (born 1968), first Hispanic woman to serve as a United States magistrate judge in the District of New Jersey, and the first Hispanic woman to be appointed a U.S. District Court judge in New Jersey
- Renoly Santiago (born 1974) Puerto Rican actor, singer and writer known for his appearances in films such as Dangerous Minds, Hackers and Con Air
- Anthony Louis Scarmolin (1890–1969), Italian-American composer, pianist and conductor, who was the administrator for the concert and band programs at Emerson High School
- Fred Shabel, former college basketball player-coach and sports executive who was the Connecticut Huskies men's basketball head coach from 1963 through 1967
- Pedro Sosa (born 1984), former American football offensive tackle for the Hartford Colonials of the defunct United Football League
- Brian P. Stack (born 1966), Assemblyman, New Jersey state senator and mayor of Union City since 2000
- Aaron Stanford (born 1976), actor known for his role as Pyro in the films X2: X-Men United and X-Men: The Last Stand
- Allison Strong, actress/singer known for her Broadway work in the musicals Bye Bye Birdie and Mamma Mia!
- Alexandria Suarez, child actor who performs the voice of Backpack on Dora the Explorer, beginning with that show's fifth season
- Dick Surhoff (1929–1987), NBA player(B)
- Janine Pommy Vega (1942–2010), poet associated with the Beats
- Larry Wainstein, politician who was elected to represent the 33rd Legislative District in the New Jersey General Assembly in 2025
- Walter Walsh (1907–2014), FBI agent and Olympic sharpshooter who participated in the capture of outlaw Arthur Barker(B)
- Alan Weiss (born 1946), entrepreneur, author and public speaker
- Gene Wettstone (1913–2013), gymnastics coach, known as the "Dean of Collegiate Gymnastics Coaches", for leading Pennsylvania State University to a record nine N.C.A.A. championships in the sport, and for coaching the United States men's teams in the 1948 and 1956 Summer Olympics(B)
- Frank Winters (born 1964), National Football League player (1987–2002) for the Green Bay Packers
- Jules Witcover (1927–2025), author and political journalist for The Baltimore Sun, the now-defunct Washington Star, the Los Angeles Times, The Washington Post and Tribune Media Services
