= Kolel Chibas Yerushalayim =

Charitable organization based in Jerusalem

- כולל חיבת ירושלים
- Adoration of Jerusalem and love of Zion — do not forget forever: The logo and slogan of the charity
- Formation: 1830
- Founded at: Jerusalem, Ottoman Empire
- Type: Charitable organization
- Headquarters: Meah Shearim, Jerusalem
- Region served: Israel
- Services: Financial support for families, dental clinics, subsidized clothing store
- Honorary Presidents: Grand Rabbi Yissachar Dov Rokeach of Belz; Grand Rabbi Zvi Spira of Bluzov; Grand Rabbi Shmuel Dovid Halberstam of Sanz Klausenburg; Grand Rabbi Ben Zion Aryeh Leibish Halberstam of Bobov; Grand Rabbi Leibish Leizer of Pshevorsk

Kolel Chibas Jerusalem (Hebrew: כולל חיבת ירושלים), one of the numerous charities known as Charity of Rabbi Meyer Ba'al Ha-Nes — named after the great 2nd century Jewish sage Rabbi Meir — is a kollel, a large charitable organization based in Jerusalem's Meah Shearim neighbourhood and which supports Jews who have emigrated to the Holy Land from Galicia, a historical geographical region spanning southeastern Poland and western Ukraine, formerly part of the Austro-Hungarian empire.

== History ==
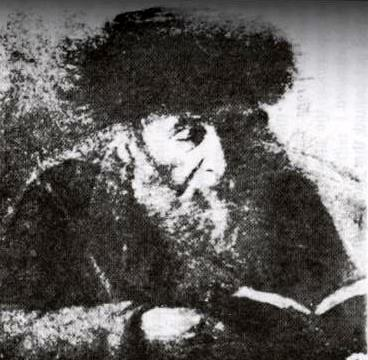
Rabbi Chaim Halberstam of Sanz, the charity's first Honorary President

=== Founding ===
The organization was established in 1830 by Jews from Galicia, Austrian Empire, to support full-time Torah students of the Yishuv haYashan.

From the outset, the organization received wide support in the Galician Jewish community, with the rabbis of Sanz, Ropshitz, Dinov, and Belz actively involved in fundraising. Small charity boxes were distributed to many Jewish homes. Families would donate however much they could, even it were only a few coins. A few times a year a local representative gabbai would make the rounds from house to house to collect the money and make a list of the donors in Hebrew. The money and lists were sent to Eretz Israel where receipts were issued. Once a year, at the start of the Jewish New Year Rosh Hashanah, the kolel in Jerusalem would send the receipts to the gabbai of each city and Shtetl with small calendars called a luach. These calendars had the Hebrew dates and the secular date, the holidays and the exact time when the Shabbos and holidays began and ended. Each gabbai would in turn distribute them in their own town. The position of gabbai for Reb Meir Baal Haness was a position that was highly respected and was passed on from father to son. Galician Jews relate that the collection was taken so seriously that many collectors would dress in their Shabbos clothing when performing work for the charity.

Due to the financial difficulties of Jews in Galicia, the charity expanded its collection network to other parts of Europe and to America.

Offices were opened in Berlin, England, Belgium, and in New York City. Most of the rabbis of Galica signed a letter to the Jewish community in the United States, asking for assistance with the charity. They declared that having a Kolel Chibas Jerusalem Reb Meyer Baal Haness charity box, in the house was a segulah for salvation, healing, success and pride from their children.

=== During WWII ===
The Nazi invasion of Eastern Europe stopped all funding from those areas. The effect was enormous and many Jews in Israel, who depended upon the Kolel Chibas Jerusalem for support, were suddenly thrown into hunger and poverty.

=== Post war ===
Following World War Two, many European survivors recalled the work which their family members had performed for the Kolel and the high regard in which it had been held. Many were thus motivated to engage in work for the organization themselves and new Gabboyim and offices were established around the world.

== Activities ==
Today, Kolel Chibas Jerusalem assists in numerous different projects in Israel.

The largest project of the Kolel's over seven million dollar budget is the Chalukah, the distribution of quarterly stipends to families that cannot make ends meet. Families are chosen carefully, their eligibility determined by a variety of factors such as family size and level of income.

Families that are not on the Chalukah list can still get special help before Pesach or Rosh Hashanah to ease the burdens generated by the additional expenses of the Yomim Tovim.

The Kolel operates three dental clinics which are used by over 5,000 people annually for a full range of dental treatments. Clients pay a third of the cost of treatment and the Kolel, at a yearly cost of over $150,000, subsidizes the remaining two thirds.

Another very important and popular service is a subsidized clothing store which stocks men's, women's and children's clothing. Patrons of the store save a minimum of 40% on all of their purchases. This operation costs the Kolel over $150,000 a year.

=== Pushkas ===
One of the main incomes of the kolel are the Kolel Chibas Jerusalem Reb Meyer Baal Haness pushkas (charity boxes). Thousands of pushkas are distributed to Jewish homes worldwide, where tzedakah is given by Jews daily, before praying, or before doing any mitzvah, or in a time of need or distress. Many people observe the custom of giving charity to Kolel Chibas Jerusalem Reb Meyer Baal Haness before the Shabbos candle lighting, which is an accustomed time to pray for important things such as good and healthy children, success, wealth, and health etc.

The Kolel has pushkas distributed in thousands of shuls, and stores owned by Jews throughout the world.

In 2011, Kolel Chibas Jerusalem was rated 1/4 by Charity Navigator, entering the list of "10 Highly Paid CEOs at Low-Rated Charities".

== Honoree Presidents ==
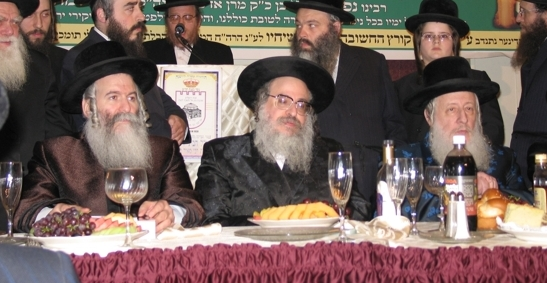
The current three Honorary Presidents

Since the establishment of the Kolel, many rabbis have served as Honoree Presidents. The first Honorary President was Rabbi Chaim Halberstam of Sanz.

Today, Grand Rabbi Shmuel Dovid Halberstam of Sanz Klausenburg - Brooklyn, NY and Grand Rabbi Ben Zion Aryeh Leibish Halberstam of Bobov - Brooklyn NY preside over the presidency in the United States. In Europe, Grand Rabbi Leibish Leizer of Pshevorsk is presiding over the Kolel.
