= Passover massacre =

2002 Hamas suicide bombing in Israel

- Part of the Second Intifada
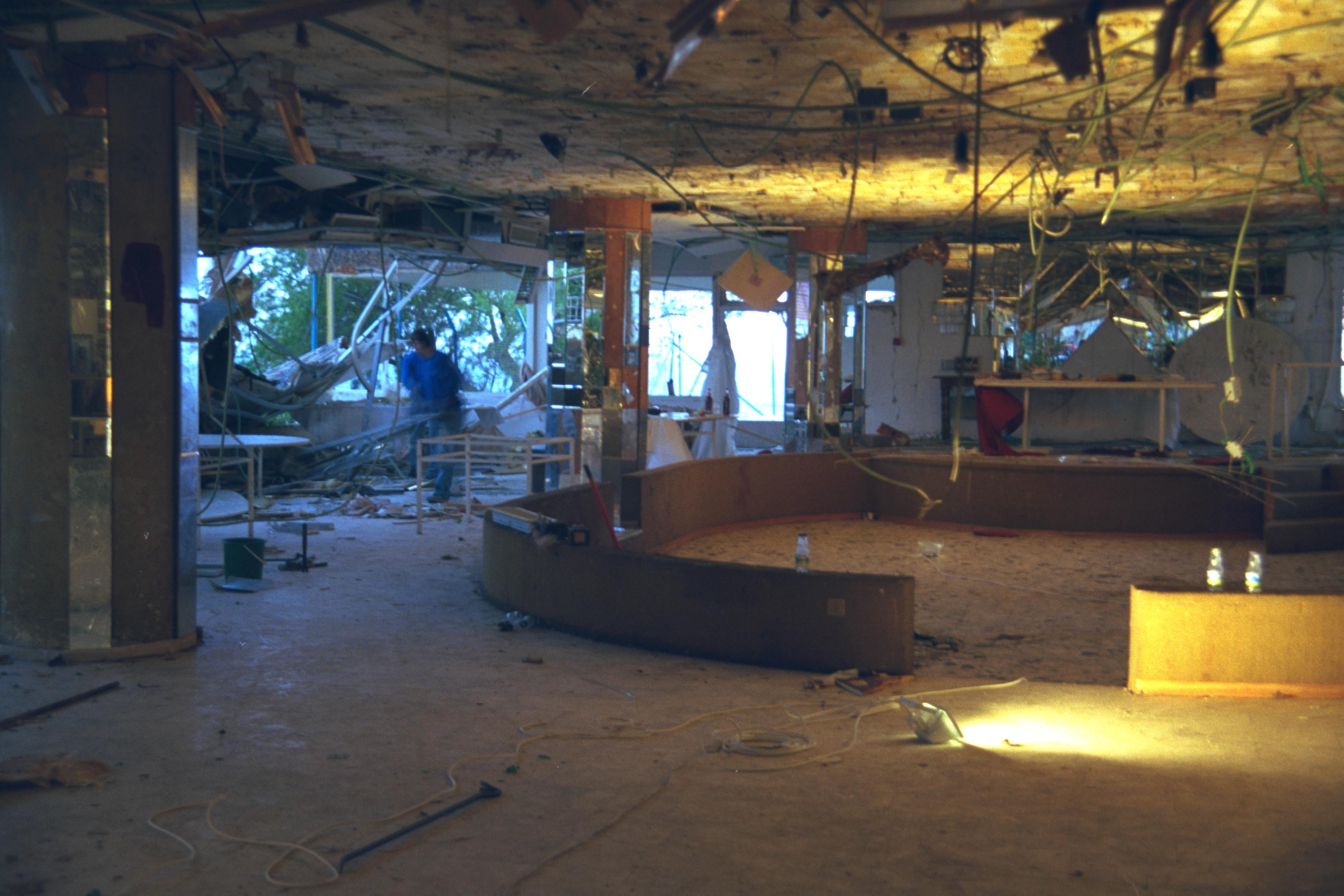
- The dining hall of the Park Hotel one day after the attack

- The attack site
- Location: 32°19′57″N 34°51′03″E; Park Hotel, Netanya, Israel
- Date: 27 March 2002; 24 years ago 19:30 pm (GMT+2)
- Attack type: Suicide bomber
- Deaths: 30 civilians (+1 assailant)
- Injuries: 160 civilians
- Perpetrator: Hamas claimed responsibility

The Passover massacre was a suicide bombing carried out by Hamas at the Park Hotel in Netanya, Israel on 27 March 2002, during a Passover seder. 30 civilians were killed in the attack and 140 were injured. It was the deadliest attack against Israeli civilians during the Second Intifada, and one of the most severe suicide attacks Israel has ever experienced.

== The attack ==
On the evening of 27 March 2002, the eve of the Jewish holiday of Passover and during the traditional seder meal, a Palestinian bomber, Abdel-Basset Odeh, approached the Park Hotel in the Israeli coastal city of Netanya disguised as a woman after shaving his mustache and beard and using a wig and makeup. Carrying a suitcase with a ten-kilogram bomb, Odeh entered the hotel's dining room, where approximately 250 civilians were celebrating the seder.

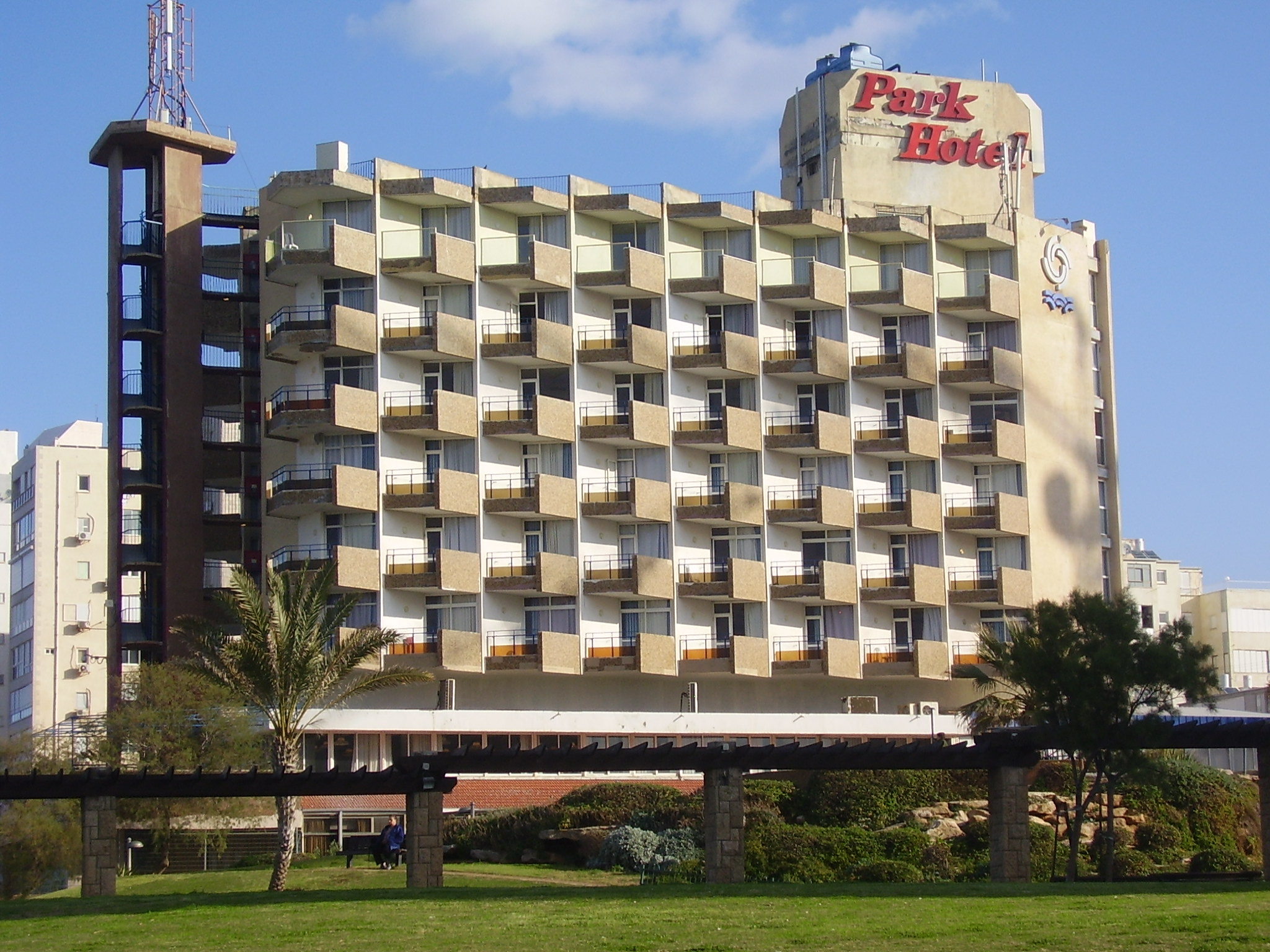
Park Hotel in Netanya. Photo taken in 2012

At 19:30 (GMT+2) the bomber detonated the explosive device he was carrying. The force of the explosion instantly killed 28 civilians and wounded 140, of whom 20 were injured severely. Two of the injured later died from their wounds. Some of the victims were Holocaust survivors.

Most of the victims were senior citizens (70 and over). The oldest victim was 90 and the youngest was 20 years old. A number of married couples were killed, as well as a father together with his daughter. One of the victims was a Jewish tourist from Sweden who was visiting Israel for Passover.

Seventy-three of the 140 injured in the attack were evacuated to Laniado Hospital in neighboring Kiryat Sanz, Netanya. Although established as a regional hospital, Laniado had established a trauma center and emergency protocol in the wake of suicide bombings and terrorist attacks in the Netanya area during the Second Intifada. In addition to medical teams, the hospital benefited from the volunteerism of Hasidim living in Kiryat Sanz, who donated blood, carried stretchers, and otherwise assisted the medical staff.

According to the indictment filed in the Tel Aviv court, the initial plot for the Passover massacre included the use of cyanide; 4 kg of cyanide had been bought and prepared for a chemical attack. Tarak Zidan had been recruited to Hamas, and during 1997 he researched the use of chlorine and other nerve agents to be used in terror attacks. In 2002, 4 kg of chlorine had been bought and packed for the attack. For unknown reasons it was not used and passed to Abbas al-Sayyid instead.

== Hamas response ==
Hamas claimed responsibility for the attack. The bomber was identified as Abd Al-Baset Odeh, a 25-year-old from the nearby West Bank city of Tulkarm. Hamas spokesman Osama Hamdan said that "This is a trial (attempt) to send a letter, to send a message, to all the world that we are trying to fight for our own freedom against a terrorist government in Israel led by Sharon" and that Israelis "have to expect those attacks from everywhere, from every Palestinian group." Another Hamas spokesperson Abdel Aziz Rantisi said "[a]s long as there is occupation, there will be a resistance" and denied that the attack was timed to coincide with the peace initiative of the Saudi government at the Beirut Summit, an initiative rejected by Hamas.

== Official reactions ==
Israeli government spokesman Gideon Meir related to the attack saying "what we had tonight was a Passover massacre" and added "There is no limit to Palestinian barbarism." Palestinian Authority officials "strongly condemned" the attack. Palestinian President Yasser Arafat personally ordered the arrests of militants associated with Hamas, Islamic Jihad, and the Al Aqsa Martyrs Brigades as a response. During a television broadcast on the Palestinian TV channel, Arafat praised the Palestinian people for the current popular uprising against Israel, but stressed that "We are against killing civilians on both sides".

Saudi Crown Prince Abdullah condemned it, while also commenting that "I will add to this by saying to the Israeli people that if their government stopped its methods of violence and destruction, and agreed to real peace, we will not hesitate in accepting that Israel live in peace with the rest of the nations in the region." Kofi Annan, United Nations Secretary General stated that he condemned suicide bombings against Israeli civilians as morally repugnant. President of the United States George W. Bush condemned the attack and called on Yasser Arafat and the Palestinian Authority to do everything in their power to stop the terrorist killing.

US Secretary of State Colin Powell stated that the bombing set the peace process back but vowed to continue.

== Aftermath ==
=== Diplomacy ===
In his response to the Arab Peace Initiative adopted at the Arab League's summit in Beirut, Foreign Affairs Minister of Israel Shimon Peres noted that "... the details of every peace plan must be discussed directly between Israel and the Palestinians, and to make this possible, the Palestinian Authority must put an end to terror, the horrifying expression of which we witnessed just last night in Netanya."

=== Israeli retaliation ===
The attack was perceived in Israel as the high point of a bloody month in which more than 135 Israelis, mostly civilians, were killed in terror attacks.

Following the Passover massacre attack the Israeli government declared a state of emergency, ordered the immediate recruitment of 20,000 reservists in an emergency call-up, and in the following day launched the large-scale counter-terrorism operation Operation Defensive Shield in the West Bank which took place between 29 March and 10 May.

Qeis Adwan, head of the suicide bombing network responsible for the massacre, was killed by IDF forces on 5 April 2002 during Operation Defensive Shield, after the IDF and the Yamam caught him in Tubas, some 70 kilometers north of Jerusalem. An armored IDF Caterpillar D9 bulldozer toppled the house where he was hiding, after he was given a chance to surrender and refused.

=== Arrests and killings of perpetrators ===
One of the two chief planners of the attack, Qais Adwan, a Hamas member who was involved in numerous attacks in which a total of 77 people were killed, was killed in a shootout with the IDF during Operation Defensive Shield. In May 2002, Israeli forces arrested the other chief planner, Abbas al-Sayyid. On 22 September 2005, al-Sayed was convicted of the Passover attack and also of ordering the May 2001 bombing of a Netanya mall. He received 35 life sentences for each murder victim and additional time for those who were wounded.

Fathi Khatib, who transported the bomber to his target, Mohand Sharim, who financed the operation and helped hide the bomber, Muammar Abu Sheikh, who recruited the bomber to Hamas and transferred the explosive belts used in the attack to an explosives expert for examination, and Nasser Yatiya, who helped transport the explosive belts, were tried and convicted together in an Israeli military court in April 2003 and handed 29 life sentences. Nasser Yatiya was released in the Gilad Shalit prisoner exchange in 2011. Muhammad Taher, who prepared the explosive charges, was killed in a clash with Israeli Shayetet 13 naval commandos in June 2003.

On 26 March 2008 Hamas commander Omar Jabar, suspected of helping organize the attack, was arrested in Tulkarem by IDF troops of the Nahshon Battalion. In March 2013 he was convicted over his role and sentenced to 30 years in prison.

In September 2009, Muhammad Harwish, a senior Hamas militant and a planner of the Passover Massacre, was arrested by the Border Police's elite Yamam counter-terror squad in his home village along with an aide, Adnan Samara.

=== Soccer tournament ===
In 2003, the Palestinian Authority sponsored a soccer tournament, Tulkarm Shahids Memorial Soccer Championship Tournament of the Shahid Abd Al-Baset Odeh, describing the perpetrator as a "shahid" ("martyr"). 71% of Palestinians polled about the tournament approved of naming it in honor of the bomber.

== See also ==
- Palestinian suicide attacks
- List of massacres in Israel
- List of terrorist incidents in 2002
- List of Hamas suicide attacks
- Battle of Jenin (2002)
- Israeli casualties of war
- Palestinian political violence

== Bibliography ==
- Falk, Ophir; Morgenstern, Henry, eds. (2009). Suicide Terror: Understanding and Confronting the Threat. Wiley. ISBN 978-0-470-08729-9.
- Ganor, Boaz (2015). Global Alert: The Rationality of Modern Islamist Terrorism and the Challenge to the Liberal Democratic World. New York: Columbia University Press. ISBN 978-0-231-53891-6.
- Siniver, Asaf, ed. (2023). Routledge Companion to the Israeli-Palestinian Conflict. Abingdon and New York: Routledge. ISBN 978-1-032-24901-8.
