= Shmuel Dovid Halberstam =

American rabbi

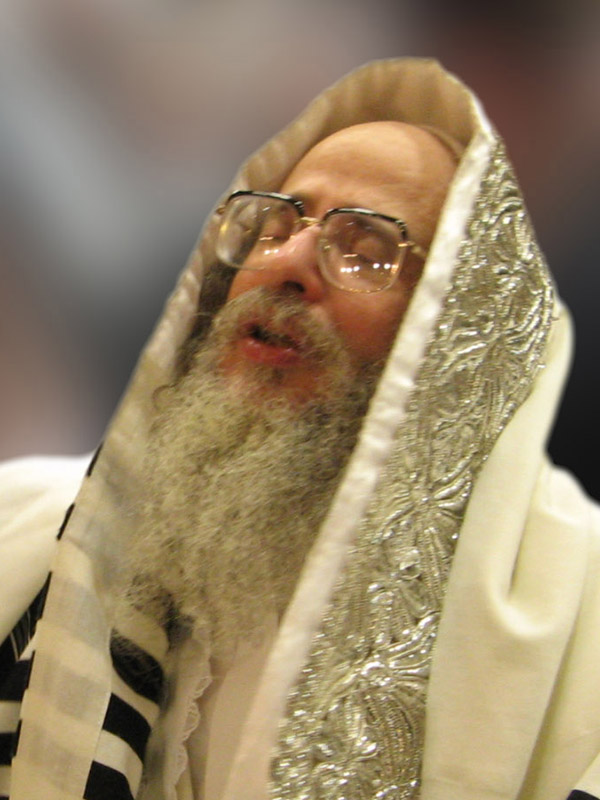
- Halberstam in 2007
- Title: Sanz-Klausenberger Rebbe

Personal life
- Born: Shmiel David Halberstam
- Spouse: Tzipora Weider
- Parents: Rabbi Yekusiel Yehudah Halberstam (father); Chaya Nechama Ungar (mother)
- Dynasty: Klausenberg

Religious life
- Religion: Judaism

Jewish leader
- Predecessor: Rabbi Yekusiel Yehudah Halberstam
- Began: 1994
- Ended: present
- Dynasty: Klausenberg

Rabbi Shmiel Dovid Halberstam (Hebrew: שמואל דוד הלברשטאם), also known as the Sanz-Klausenberger Rebbe, is the younger son and one of the successors of Rabbi Yekusiel Yehudah Halberstam, the previous Klausenberger Rebbe. He resides in Brooklyn, New York.

== Biography ==
He is one of seven children born in his father's second marriage to Chaya Nechama Ungar, daughter of the Nitra Rav, Rabbi Shmuel Dovid Ungar. He was named after his maternal grandfather, who died during the Holocaust. Halberstam has five sisters and an older brother, Rabbi Zvi Elimelech Halberstam, who is the Sanzer Rebbe of Israel. He married Tzipora Weider, daughter of Rabbi Aharon Wieder, the Linzer Rav, who was a long-time dayan in the Klausenberger beis din (rabbinical court) in America.

Rabbi Halberstam is the leader of North American operations for the Mifal HaShas Torah study network founded by his father, and honoree president of the Kolel Chibas Yerushalayim charity organization in the name of Reb Meir Baal HaNess.

He is known for his effusive and lengthy prayers.

== See also ==
- Klausenberg (Hasidic dynasty)
- Sanz (Hasidic dynasty)
