= Zvi Elimelech Halberstam =

Israeli rabbi (born 1952)

- צבי אלימלך הלברשטאם
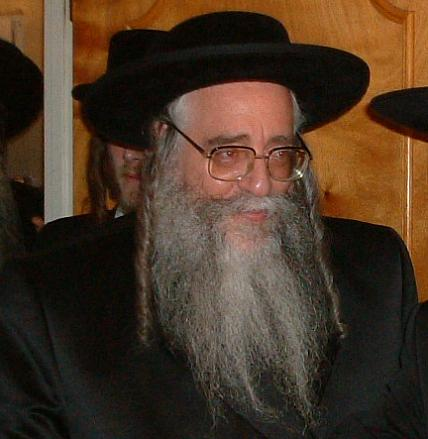
- Title: Sanz-Klausenburger Rebbe of Netanya, Israel

Personal life
- Born: Zvi Elimelech Halberstam; 1952 (age 73–74)
- Parents: Yekusiel Yehudah Halberstam (father); Chaya Nechama Ungar (mother)
- Dynasty: Klausenburg

Religious life
- Religion: Judaism

Jewish leader
- Predecessor: Yekusiel Yehudah Halberstam
- Began: 1994
- Dynasty: Klausenburg

Zvi Elimelech Halberstam (Hebrew: צבי אלימלך הלברשטאם, Yiddish: צבי אלימלך האלבערשטאם; born 1952) is the present Sanz Rebbe of Netanya, Israel. He is also known as the Sanzer Rebbe. He is the son of Rabbi Yekusiel Yehudah Halberstam, the first Sanz-Klausenberger Rebbe, who in his will divided the leadership of the Klausenburger Hasidim between his two surviving sons, Rabbi Zvi Elimelech and Rabbi Shmuel Dovid (the present Sanz-Klausenburger Rebbe of Brooklyn). He holds his court in the Kiryat Sanz neighborhood of Netanya, founded by his father.

== Biography ==
Halberstam was a child of his father's second marriage in 1947 to Chaya Nechama Ungar, the orphaned daughter of the Nitra Rav, Rabbi Shmuel Dovid Ungar. This marriage produced two sons — Rabbi Zvi Elimelech and Rabbi Shmuel Dovid — and five daughters.

== Leadership ==
Upon his father's death in 1994, Rabbi Zvi Elimelech became the spiritual leader of the Sanz community in Israel. He is responsible for the Sanz Torah and chessed organizations in Netanya, Jerusalem, Bnei Brak, Petah Tikva, Haifa, Safed, Ashdod, Modiin, Beitar Illit, and Elad. and in borough park, Williamsburg, Monsey and Lakewood. He is also directly responsible for all the institutions built by his father in Israel, including Laniado Hospital, where he serves as president.

== See also ==
- Klausenberg (Hasidic dynasty)
- Sanz (Hasidic dynasty)
- Haredi Judaism
