= Laniado Hospital =

Coordinates: 32°20′42.35″N 34°51′24.32″E

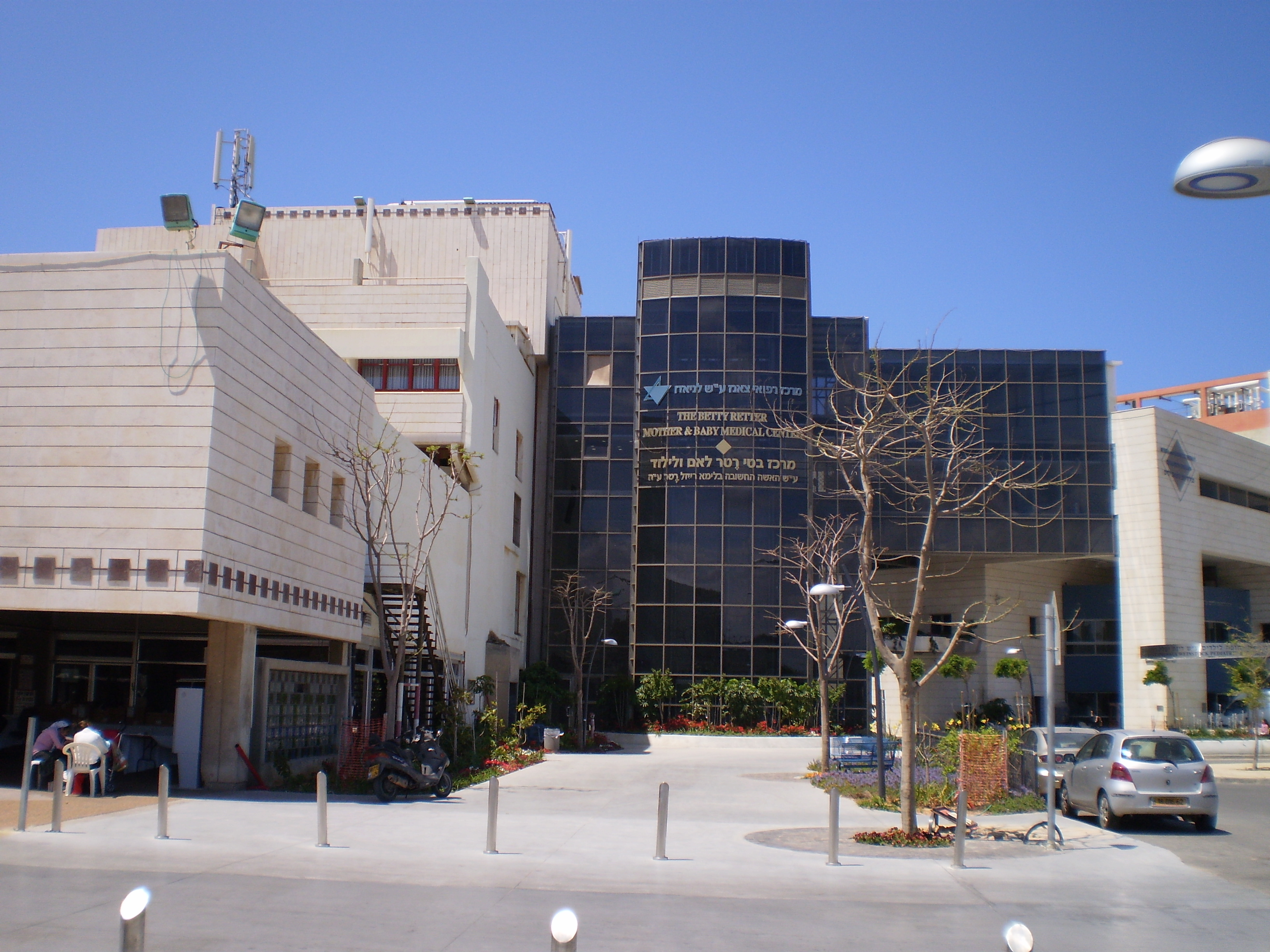
- The hospital's maternity wing

Geography
- Location: Kiryat Sanz, Netanya, Israel

Organisation
- Care system: Non profit
- Type: District General
- Affiliated university: None
- Patron: Judaism

Services
- Emergency department: Yes
- Beds: 484

History
- Opened: 1975

Links
- Website: www.laniado.org.il
- Lists: Hospitals in Israel

Laniado Hospital, also known as the Sanz Medical Center, is a voluntary, not-for-profit hospital in Kiryat Sanz, Netanya, Israel, serving a regional population of over 450,000 in Netanya and the Sharon plain. Opened in 1975 by Rabbi Yekusiel Yehudah Halberstam, the first Klausenburger Rebbe, Laniado Hospital is run according to Jewish law and is known as the only hospital in Israel which has never closed due to a strike. It is administered by the Sanz-Klausenburg Hasidic dynasty under the direction of the present Sanz-Klausenburger Rebbe in israel, Rabbi Zvi Elimelech Halberstam.

Though it is not a major emergency-care center, Laniado served a critical role as a triage hospital during more than 20 Netanya-area suicide bombings and terrorist attacks in the Second Intifada. The worst of these was the 2002 Passover massacre at the Park Hotel, located three minutes from the hospital. Laniado also treated wounded soldiers from the First and Second Lebanon War. Hospital personnel have developed an emergency preparedness protocol that regularly updates surgeons, trauma specialists, cardiologists and pediatricians on their roles during an emergency.

== Origin ==
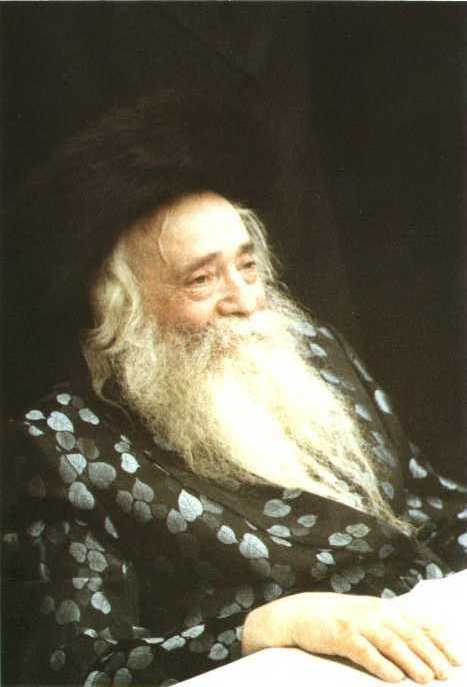
Rabbi Yekusiel Yehudah Halberstam, founder of Laniado Hospital.

The vision for establishing the hospital originated during the Holocaust, when Rabbi Yekusiel Yehudah Halberstam experienced the brutality and inhumanity of the Nazis firsthand. At the cornerstone-laying for Laniado's second building in 1980, he told the assemblage in Yiddish:

I was saved from the gas chambers, saved from Hitler. I spent several years in Nazi death camps. Besides the fact that they murdered my wife and 11 children, my mother, my sisters and my brother — of my whole family, some 150 people, I was the only one who survived — I witnessed their cruelty.

I remember as if it were today how they shot me in the arm. I was afraid to go to the Nazi infirmary, though there were doctors there. I knew that if I went in, I'd never come out alive. … Despite my fear of the Nazis, I plucked a leaf from a tree and stuck it to my wound to stanch the bleeding. Then I cut a branch and tied it around the wound to hold it in place. With God's help, it healed in three days.

Then I promised myself that if, with God's help, I got well and got out of there, away from those resha'im (wicked people), I would build a hospital in Eretz Yisrael where every human being would be cared for with dignity. And the basis of that hospital would be that the doctors and nurses would believe that there is a God in this world and that when they treat a patient, they are fulfilling the greatest mitzvah in the Torah.

== History ==
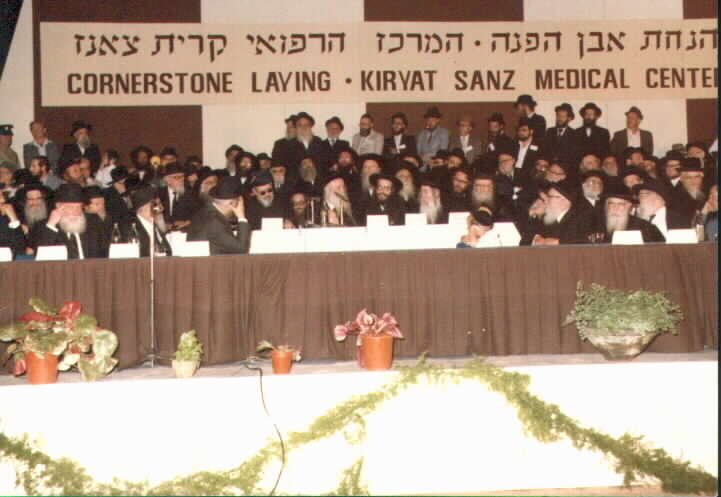
View of the dais at the cornerstone-laying ceremony for Laniado Hospital in 1974. Rabbi Yekusiel Yehudah Halberstam is seen at center left; his son, Rabbi Zvi Elimelech Halberstam (with glasses) is seated to his left.

The Rebbe began working towards his goal two years after founding the Hasidic community of Kiryat Sanz in northern Netanya. In 1958 he laid the cornerstone for a hospital, although he had no capital, no fund-raising apparatus, and no building permit. He petitioned the authorities for the permit, but the left-wing Minister of Health refused, reportedly offering Halberstam the job of supervising religious activities at government hospitals instead. In 1962 the leftist party which controlled the Health Ministry suddenly quit the government coalition and the ministry was given to the Torah-observant Hapoel HaMizrachi party. One day the deputy health minister, Yitzhak Rafael, and other officials visited the Rebbe in Netanya. After the meeting, the Rebbe called Rafael aside and asked him to use his position to help other Torah-observant Jews. Two days later, the building permit arrived in the mail.

The Rebbe spent 15 years personally fund-raising for his hospital in North and South America. Whenever he collected some money, he would continue building. In 1963 he received his first major donation in the form of a $300,000 bequest from the estate of Alfonse and Yaakov Avraham Laniado, Swiss bankers who had willed their money to health and educational institutions in Israel. The Rebbe decided to name the new hospital after the Laniado brothers. In 1972, a $500,000 grant from the United States Agency for International Development helped complete the electrical, plumbing and elevator systems. Now the only thing lacking was an operating permit, which the government was still loath to supply. The Minister of Health at the time claimed that permits had already been granted to three hospitals in the Netanya area, but Sidney Greenwald, the first chairman of the American Friends of Laniado Hospital, convinced him to issue one to the Klausenburger Rebbe, too. In the end, Laniado was the only hospital opened in Netanya.

The first building, an outpatient clinic, opened in 1975. In June 1976, a maternity ward opened, followed by an emergency room and internal medicine department in 1977, a cardiology and intensive-care unit in 1978, and ophthalmology and dialysis units in 1979. The hospital continued to expand every year thereafter. Until his death in 1994, the Rebbe planned the strategic development of the hospital's departments and services, and supervised every aspect of the hospital's operation.

Today Laniado Hospital includes departments for radiology, hematology, pediatric emergency, oncology, in vitro fertilisation, geriatrics, women's health, and many more. The largest department in the hospital is the maternity ward, which delivers more than 6,000 babies annually.

Laniado lies within a five-block radius of other institutions founded by the Klausenburger Rebbe — including synagogues, Talmud Torahs, girls schools, yeshivas, kollels, an orphanage, and an old-age home — and the Kiryat Sanz Hasidic community itself.

== Operating principles ==
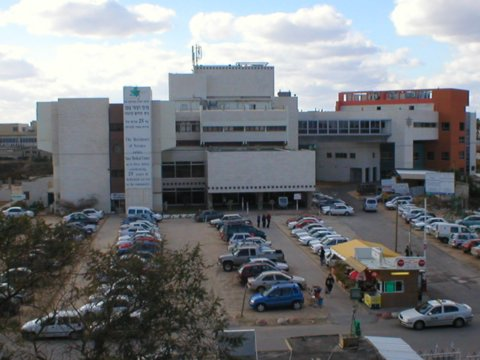
The hospital in 2007

On opening day, the Klausenburger Rebbe promulgated a set of nine Founding Principles emphasizing the hospital's raison d'être as a means of fulfilling the Torah's commandments to heal, to love one's fellow man, and to demonstrate belief in God. The Rebbe regarded the hospital as just another Torah institution, and instructed his staff to treat patients with the Torah principles of kindness and compassion.

Laniado is operated strictly according to Jewish law. A hospital rabbi is available to answer halakhic questions 24 hours a day, instruct staff, and supervise the kashrut of foods served in the wards. The hospital mashgiach (spiritual supervisor) ensures Shabbat observance in the wards, makes Kiddush and Havdalah for the patients, blows shofar on Rosh Hashana, and provides the Four Species during Sukkot. Non-Jewish staff answers phones and performs writing tasks on Shabbat and Yom Tov. All staff and visitors are expected to dress according to the laws of tzniut (modesty). Television sets are banned from the premises. Far from alienating the non-religious residents of Netanya, Laniado's positive atmosphere and dedication to healing have been favorably received.

Because of its commitment to healing, the Rebbe insisted that the hospital should never close due to a strike. Indeed, a no-strike clause is written into every employee's contract. The first test of this no-strike policy occurred during the 1983 general doctors' strike which crippled Israeli hospitals for over four months. Laniado was ostracized by the doctor's union, but the Rebbe refused to yield. Since then, Laniado has never participated in any doctors' or nurses' strike.

The hospital is also committed to doing everything possible to preserve and improve the quality of life. To that end, Laniado often provides expensive and often non-reimbursable medical services which exceed its annual operating budget of $50 million. The hospital relies heavily on private donations to make up its budget shortfall.

== Nursing school ==
In 1978, the Rebbe opened the Laniado nursing school to educate nurses in the "Jewish way" of caring for the infirm. As of 2006, the school had graduated 1,000 nurses, who found jobs at Laniado and at other hospitals throughout Israel. The school offers a 30-month certification course for religious girls (which includes an 18-month course on the halakhic aspects of healing), and a 20-month practical nursing course for women of all ages and backgrounds. In 1986 the school broke ground on a new building donated by Rudolph and Edith Tessler, and was renamed the Tessler Nursing School.

== Innovations and medical discoveries ==
In keeping with the hospital's commitment to the sanctity of life, Laniado doctors and researchers are constantly looking for better ways to treat illness. Researchers in the hematology department regularly work together with Laniado doctors on stem cell and diabetes research. In the early 2000s, specialists from the hematology, neurology and infectious diseases departments discovered the first cure for West Nile virus while treating a 70-year-old patient. In the coronary care department, physicians have speeded up catheterization of incoming patients by routing Magen David Adom ambulances directly to the coronary care unit rather than the emergency room. A government survey of all coronary intensive care facilities in Israel showed that the recovery rate for heart-attack victims at Laniado is 30 percent higher than the national average.
