= Rudnik nad Sanem =

Town in Podkarpackie Voivodeship, Poland

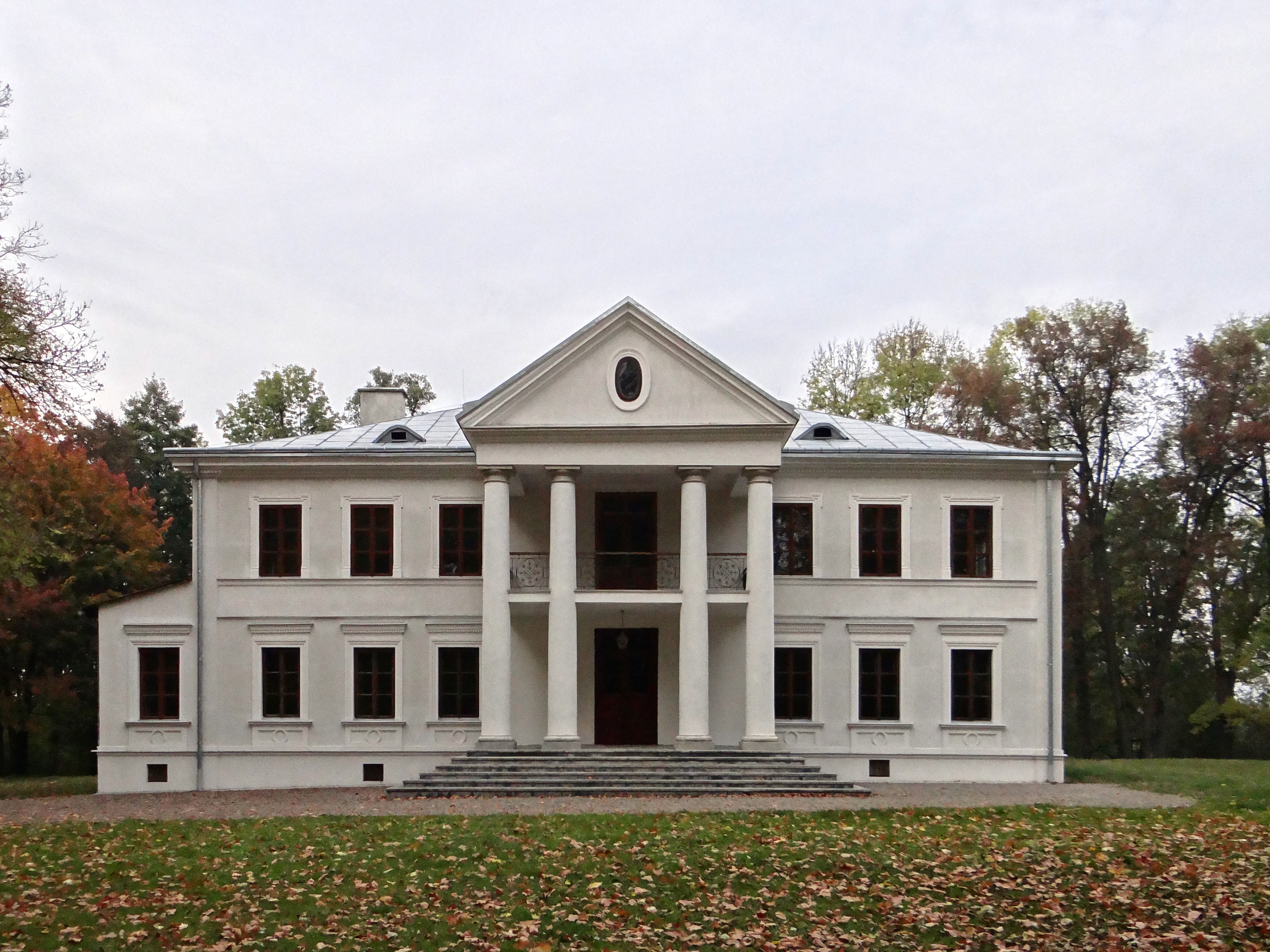
- Tarnowski Palace

- Coat of arms
- Nickname: Polish Capital of Wicker
- Location within Poland
- Coordinates: 50°26′38″N 22°14′27″E
- Country: Poland
- Voivodeship: Subcarpathian
- County: Nisko
- Gmina: Rudnik nad Sanem
- Town rights: 1552

Government
  - Mayor: Tadeusz Handziak (Ind.)

Area
  - Total: 36.26 km^{2} (14.00 sq mi)

Population (2006)
  - Total: 6,744
  - Density: 186.0/km^{2} (481.7/sq mi)
- Time zone: UTC+1 (CET)
  - Summer (DST): UTC+2 (CEST)
- Postal code: 37–420
- Vehicle registration: RNI
- Website: http://www.rudnik.pl/

Rudnik nad Sanem [ˈrudɲik ˌnat ˈsanɛm] (until 1997 Rudnik, Yiddish: רודניק Ridnik) is a town in Nisko County, Subcarpathian Voivodeship, Poland, with a population of 6,765 (02.06.2009). The town is located next to the river San, hence the "nad Sanem" (on the San) part of the name, which was appended to the official name in 1997. Rudnik prides itself as the Polish Capital of Wicker.

== Location and name ==
Rudnik belongs to the historic province of Lesser Poland, and since its foundation until the Partitions of Poland, the town was part of the Sandomierz Voivodeship. The town is located on the left bank of the San.

Rudnik took its name from the river Rudna (Rudnik). The river's surroundings were very wet and marshy, the colour was rusty red. This was due to the riverbed containing layers of iron ore. Even today observers will notice the reddish tint in the water. The surrounding forests contain layers of iron ore rich turf, mined for hundreds of years by people who lived in the vicinity.

== History ==
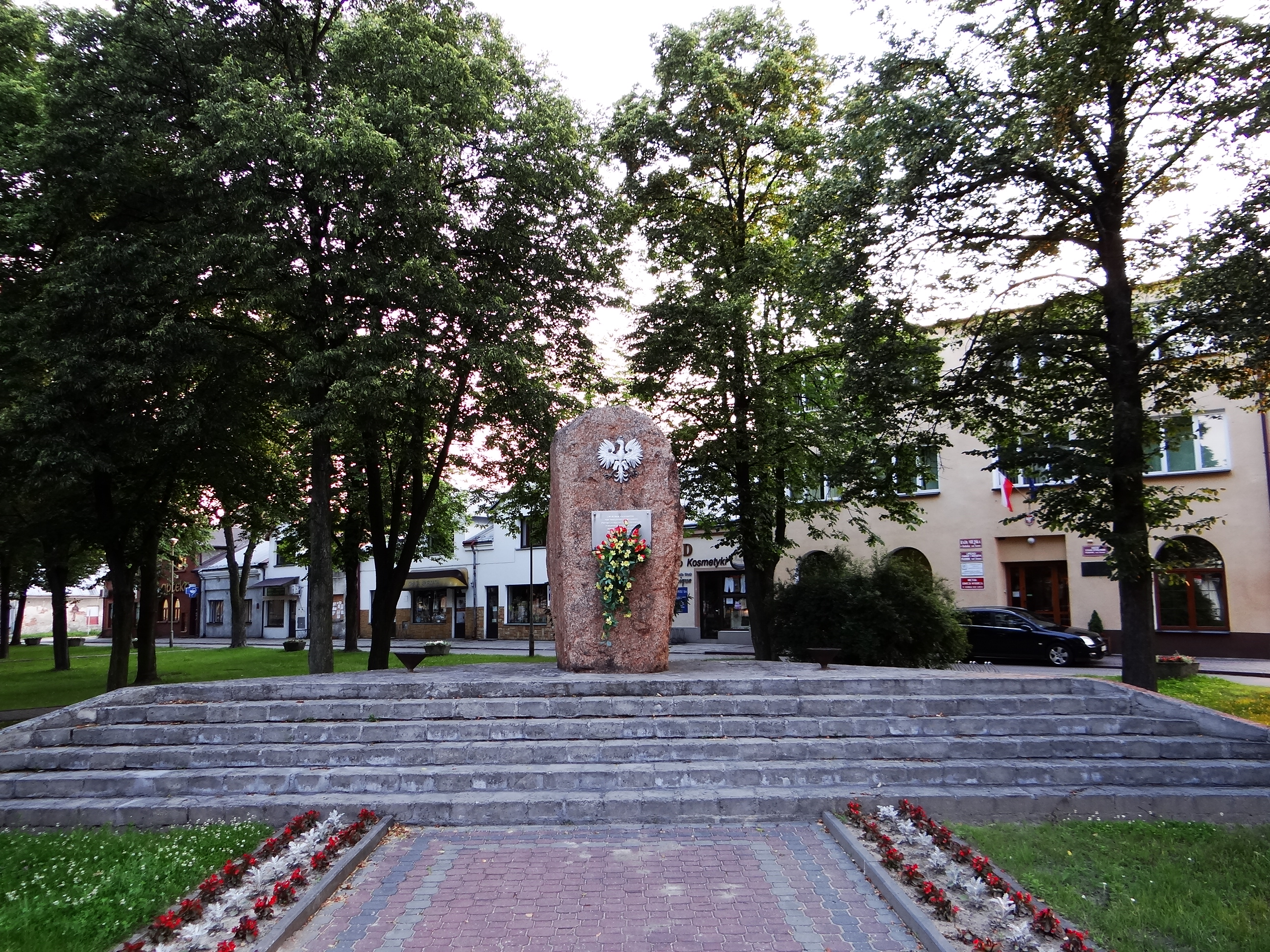
Town center with a World War II memorial

The settlement of Rudnik was probably founded in the 14th century, after the former Czerwień Cities/Red Ruthenia were reintegranted with the Kingdom of Poland. It developed due to the location along the San riverway, and received town charter in 1552, due to efforts of a local nobleman, Krzysztof Gnojenski. The town was established in the location of the village of Kopki. Rudnik for centuries remained in private hands; it belonged to the Gnojenski, the Lipnicki and the Ulinski families. In the 17th century the town had a parish church together with a school, while its artisans competed with those from nearby Ulanów.

During the Swedish invasion of Poland, in early 1656, a cavalry unit of Stefan Czarniecki smashed here a Swedish unit, which guarded King Charles X Gustav. The King himself narrowly escaped capture by the Poles. Following the Partitions of Poland, Rudnik was annexed by the Habsburg Empire, and made part of the province of Galicia. Due to proximity of the Austrian–Russian border, Rudnik became an important crossing point for Polish rebels, fighting in the January Uprising. The town frequently burned, as most of its houses were made of timber. Rudnik was almost completely destroyed during World War I, when Austrian and Russian armies fought in the town and its area for six weeks.

In 1918, Poland regained independence and control of the town. In the interwar period, it was administratively located in the Nisko County in the Lwów Voivodeship. According to the 1921 census, it had a population of 2,959, 73.1% Polish and 26.6% Jewish.

Following the German-Soviet invasion of Poland, which started World War II in September 1939, the town was occupied by Germany from 1939 to 1944.

=== Jews of Rudnik ===
Notable personalities who lived in Rudnik include Rabbis Chaim Halberstam who served as its town rabbi from 1796, Boruch Halberstam (1860–1867), and Tsvi Hersh Halberstam (1867–1906). The last Rabbi of Rudnik, Rabbi Benjamin Halberstam, established a synagogue on the Upper West Side of Manhattan, where he served as Rabbi until his demise.

== Sights ==
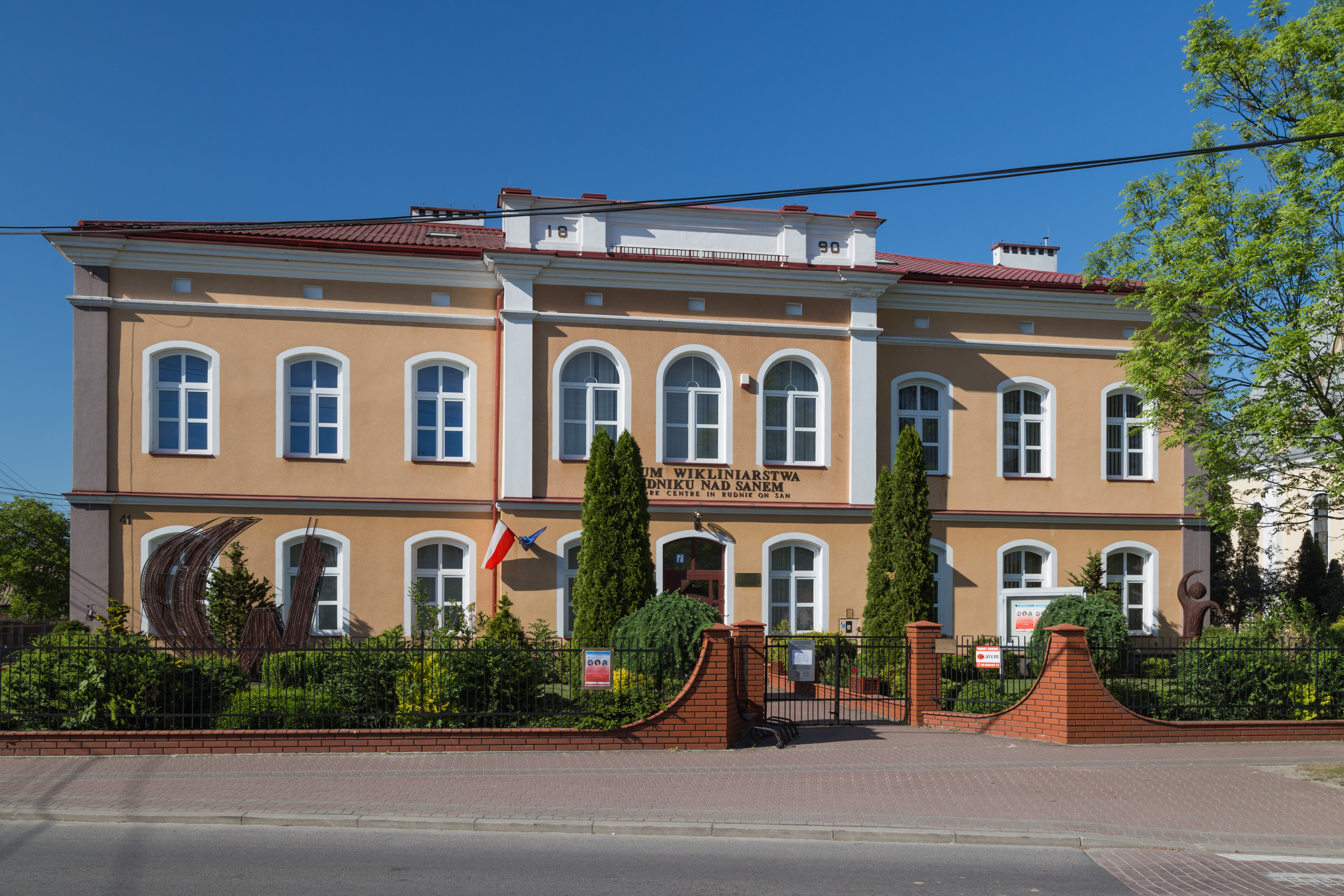
Wickerwork Centre

- a palace of the Tarnowski family (19th century),
- Wickerwork Centre
- Baroque monument of St. John of Nepomuk,
- World War I cemetery
- Holy Trinity church (1927–1928)
- World War II memorials

== Notable people ==
- Lidia Bogaczowna, film and theatre actress,
- Yekusiel Yehudah Halberstam, Jewish Orthodox rabbi and the founding rebbe of the Sanz-Klausenberg Hasidic dynasty,
- Julian Krzewicki, major of the Home Army, arrested by the Communist government in the 1950s.

== International relations ==
=== Twin towns — Sister cities ===
Rudnik nad Sanem, is twinned with:

- Gelnica, Slovakia
