= Shmuel Dovid Ungar =

Slovak rabbi (1886–1945)

Rabbi Shmuel Dovid Ungar

Personal life
- Born: Shmuel Dovid Ungar; 23 November 1885 Pöstyén, Kingdom of Hungary, Austria-Hungary (now Piešťany, Slovakia)
- Died: 9 February 1945 (aged 59) Slovakia
- Buried: Piešťany, Slovakia
- Spouse: Miriam Leah Fisher
- Children: Sholom Moshe; Yaakov Yitzchak; Benzion; Chaya Nechama
- Parent: Rabbi Yosef Moshe Ungar

Religious life
- Religion: Judaism
- Denomination: Haredi Judaism

Jewish leader
- Successor: Rabbi Sholom Moshe Ungar
- Yeshiva: Nitra Yeshiva
- Position: Rosh Yeshiva
- Began: 1931
- Ended: 1944
- Residence: Nitra, Slovakia

Rabbi Shmuel Dovid Ungar (23 November 1885 – 9 February 1945), also known as Rabbi Samuel David Ungar, was the rabbi of the Hungarian city of Nyitra (now Nitra, Slovakia) and dean of the last surviving yeshiva in occupied Europe during World War II. He was the father-in-law of Rabbi Chaim Michael Dov Weissmandl, and played a minor role in the Bratislava Working Group's efforts to save Slovak Jews from the Holocaust.

== Early life ==
Ungar was the only son born to his father, Rabbi Yosef Moshe Ungar (1855–1897), the rabbi of the town of Pöstyén (today: Piešťany). He was a descendant of the Abrabanel. Ungar's father died when he was 11 years old, and he became a frequent guest at the home of Rabbi Kalman Weber, who was appointed Rav of Pöstyén in his father's place.

After his bar mitzvah, Shmuel Dovid left home to study at the yeshiva in Prešov, headed by his uncle, Rabbi Noach Baruch Fisher. Later, he studied at the yeshiva in Unsdorf, led by Rabbi Shmuel Rosenberg. He married his first cousin, Miriam Leah Fisher, daughter of Rabbi Noach Baruch.

== Rabbi and rosh yeshiva ==
At the age of 21, Ungar became the Rav of Korompa (today: Krompachy), and founded a yeshiva in that town. Five years later, he was asked to become Rav and Rosh Yeshiva of Nagyszombat (today: Trnava), an old and well-established Jewish community, which he served for 15 years. It was during this tenure that he became known as one of the leading rabbis of Europe for his erudition and strict adherence to halakha. It was also during this time that Rabbi Chaim Michael Dov Weissmandl joined his yeshiva and formed a life-long attachment to him.

In 1931, Ungar was approached by the town of Nitra, which had recently lost its chief rabbi, Rabbi Avraham Aharon Katz, with a request that he head that community. To sweeten the offer, the community promised to help him expand its yeshiva under his leadership. Weissmandl tried to dissuade Ungar from accepting the offer, arguing that it would be a mistake to leave an established community like Trnava for Nitra, which was only about 200 years old and had 3,000 Jews. Ungar, however, said he would go. "My heart tells me that the day will come when there will be no yeshiva anywhere in Slovakia but Nitra, and I want to be there when that happens", he said presciently.

In Nitra, Ungar built up a yeshiva with nearly 300 students that eventually attracted students from Czechoslovakia, Romania, Austria, and Germany. He taught in the classic Hungarian style introduced by the Chasam Sofer, and although he did not set out to produce rabbis, some of his students did go on to become prominent rabbis in their hometowns. He developed a close and loving relationship with each student, and kept the connection after they left, conducting an alumni re-union every five years. Weissmandl married his Rav's daughter, Bracha Rachel, in 1937, and became Ungar's right-hand man in all aspects of running the yeshiva.

Besides his position as the chief rabbi of Nitra, Ungar was appointed vice president of the Moetzes Gedolei HaTorah, the supreme religious body of World Agudath Israel, in 1935.

== World War II ==
Persecution of Jews began even before World War II in Slovakia, where the Munich Agreement of 1938 carved Czechoslovakia into separate states. Slovakia became a totalitarian state run by the Catholic priest Jozef Tiso, who allied with Nazi Germany and supported discrimination against his country's Jews. In 1942, deportations from Slovakia to Auschwitz, via Lublin, began. The first Jews were forced to leave Nitra on the Shabbat after Passover.

Ungar could have left Slovakia to save his life, but he refused to desert his community and his yeshiva. Defying a Nazi order to remain at home on that first day of deportations, Ungar walked to the synagogue to spend the third meal of Shabbat with his flock.

After 58,000 Jews had been expelled from Slovakia, Weissmandl, in conjunction with the Working Group that he and other activists had established to try to save Slovak Jews, attempted one of the most ambitious rescue schemes of the Holocaust. With a $50,000 bribe to Dieter Wisliceny (Adolf Eichmann's deputy in the Jewish Section of the Reich Security Main Office, and adviser on Jewish affairs to the Slovak government), the Working Group managed to halt the deportations until 1944.

Weissmandl also intervened with the Slovak government to allow the Nitra Yeshiva to continue functioning as the only legal yeshiva in the country during the next two years. To assist students who were still being accosted and sent to forced labor camps, the yeshiva constructed hiding places under the bimah and above bookcases in its study hall, in the event of Nazi raids. Often, the warning came at such short notice that Talmuds would be left lying open on the tables as everyone fled and hid. Despite these disruptions, Ungar continued to teach and give weekly examinations as usual.

== In hiding ==
In August 1944, the Nazis crushed a revolt by Slovak partisans who had never supported Slovakia's Nazi regime, and the German army entered and occupied the country -- this is the first time they entered Slovakia. Deportations of Jews to Auschwitz resumed in greater intensity than before. The Nitra Yeshiva was liquidated on September 5, 1944. By September 17, every remaining Jew in Nitra had been deported.

Ungar and one of his sons, Sholom Moshe, together with Rabbi Meir Eisler, had been vacationing in the forests of the Zobor Mountain near Nitra. When they heard that the yeshiva had been liquidated, they did not return to Nitra. They made their way to Bistritz, which was under partisan control, but when the Germans attacked that city the following month, they fled and spent the winter hiding in mountain caves and subsisting on starvation rations. Ungar kept a diary in which he recorded his travails and prepared his spiritual will.

Throughout that winter of hiding in the forest, Ungar scrupulously observed Jewish law, even though he was starving to death. He refused to eat bread or milk obtained from Gentiles, or to even eat bread if there was no water for ritual hand-washing. On one occasion, he received some grapes, but would not eat them immediately; he insisted on squeezing them so that he could use the juice to perform Kiddush on the Sabbath. While terror and fear were others' constant companions, he was concerned with how to fulfill the mitzvah of hearing the shofar blasts on Rosh Hashanah.

Ungar died of typhus on 9 February 1945 (8 Adar 5705 according to the Hebrew calendar). He instructed his son where and how to bury him, said his last confession (viduy), and died. After the war, his son re-interred him in Piešťany, his birthplace, next to the grave of his father.

== Legacy ==
Two of Ungar's sons, Sholom Moshe (1916–2003) and Yaakov Yitzchak, and a daughter, Chaya Nechama, survived the war. (Chaya Nechama later married Rabbi Yekusiel Yehudah Halberstam, the Klausenberger Rebbe, in America in 1947.) Another son, Benzion, the Rav of Piešťany, was taken to a prison camp in Sereď, where he was murdered by Slovak military police. Ungar's rebbetzin, Miriam Leah, was also murdered, together with many other family members. Ungar's son-in-law, Chaim Michael Dov Weissmandl, survived the war.

Ungar's Torah writings were saved by a Gentile woman who gave them to Ungar's son, Sholom Moshe, after the war. These were published under the title Ne'os Desheh ("Lush meadows", a line from Psalm 23; the second word in Hebrew, דשא, contains his initials, שמואל דוד אונגר).

After the war, Rabbi Sholom Moshe Ungar was named Rav of Nitra by the survivors of that city, and re-opened the Nitra Yeshiva. In 1946, he and his brother-in-law, Rabbi Weissmandl, moved the Nitra Yeshiva to Somerville, New Jersey. In 1948, the yeshiva was moved again to its present site in Mount Kisco, New York. See Yeshiva of Nitra.

Rabbi Sholom Moshe Ungar's son, Rabbi Shmuel Dovid Ungar (named after his grandfather), is the current Nitra Rav and Rosh Yeshiva. Today, the Nitra community has branches in Boro Park, Williamsburg, Monsey, and Jerusalem, Israel.
