= Zobor transmitter =

Transmitter in Slovakia

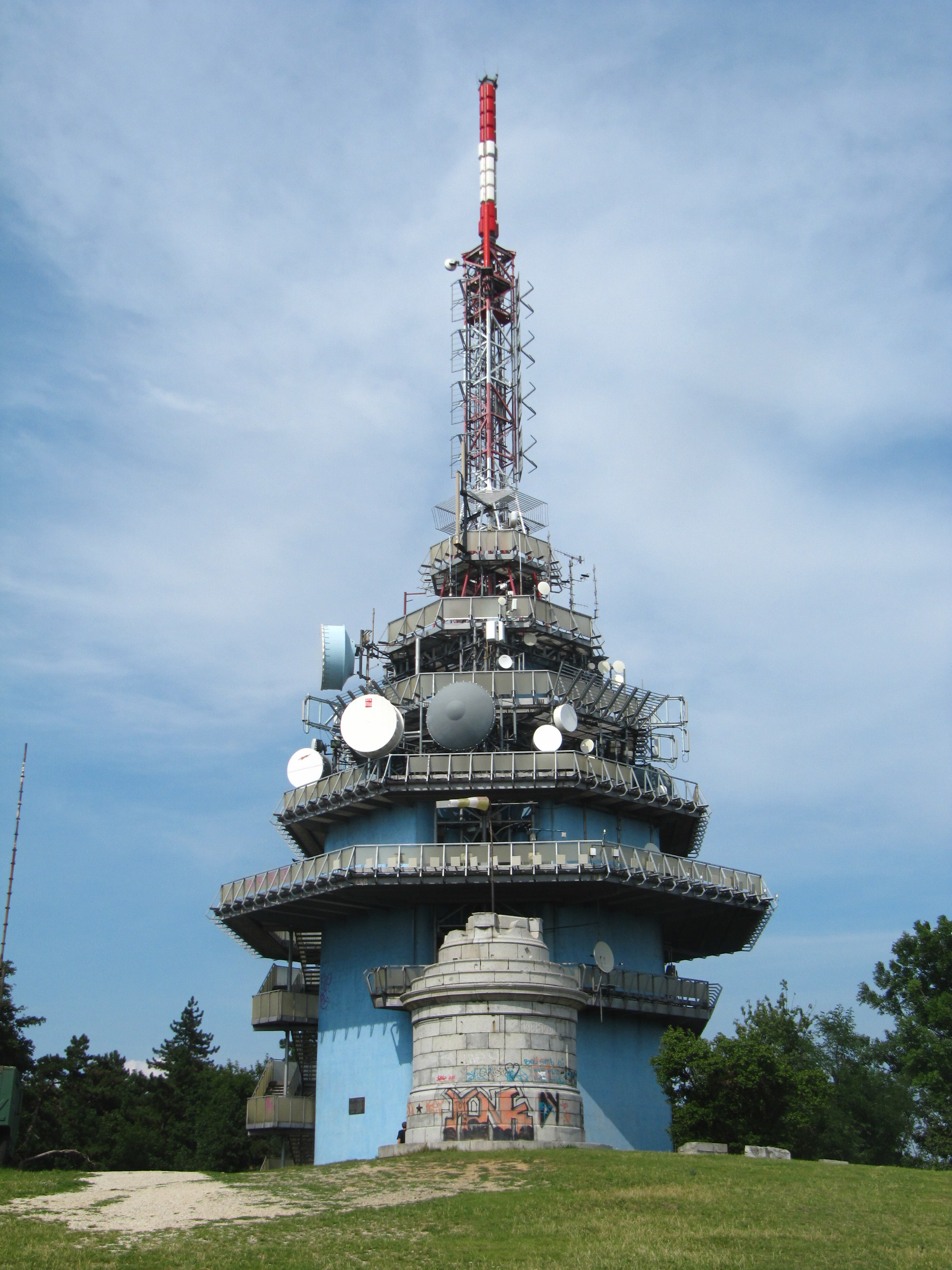
- Location: Nitra, Slovakia
- Tower height: 64 m (210 ft)
- Coordinates: 48.343056°N 18.105278°E
- Built: 1980s

Zobor transmitter (Slovak: Vysielač Zobor) is a radio and television transmitter in Slovakia. It is located directly above the city of Nitra, on the Pyramid, the pre-peak of Zobor in the Tribeč Mountains. It is 556 meters above sea level.

== History ==
In September 1992, a lattice mast was starting to be built on Zobor, from which the television signal would be transmitted. The tower's construction finished shortly after the Velvet Revolution, in March 1993. It was originally designed by architects Štefan Ďurkovič and Štefan Svetko. The significant elevation was also used as an important junction of the RR routes, so the construction of a communication tower in the early 1990s was logical. The tower is 64 m high, of which the antenna itself measures 11.5 m and weighs 2.5 tons. During the boom of FM broadcasting, the signal was transmitted from the original mast, after the construction of the tower, which also serves as an operating building, broadcasting began from the antennas at its top. On 20 March 2011, 19 new digital multiplex transmitters where put into operation on to of the Zobor transmitter.

== Location ==
The advantageous location of the transmitter above the vast Danube Plain, high radiated power and altitude cause long-distance signal reception, especially in the southern and southwestern directions. The priority area of coverage is the flat region of the Nitra and Trnava regions, up to the state border with Hungary. However, the overlaps allow the signal to be received also in the Pohronie Region, Horná Nitra, Tekovo or part of Považie. It can also be received in the territory of Hungary.

== Gallery ==
Detail of the tower structure

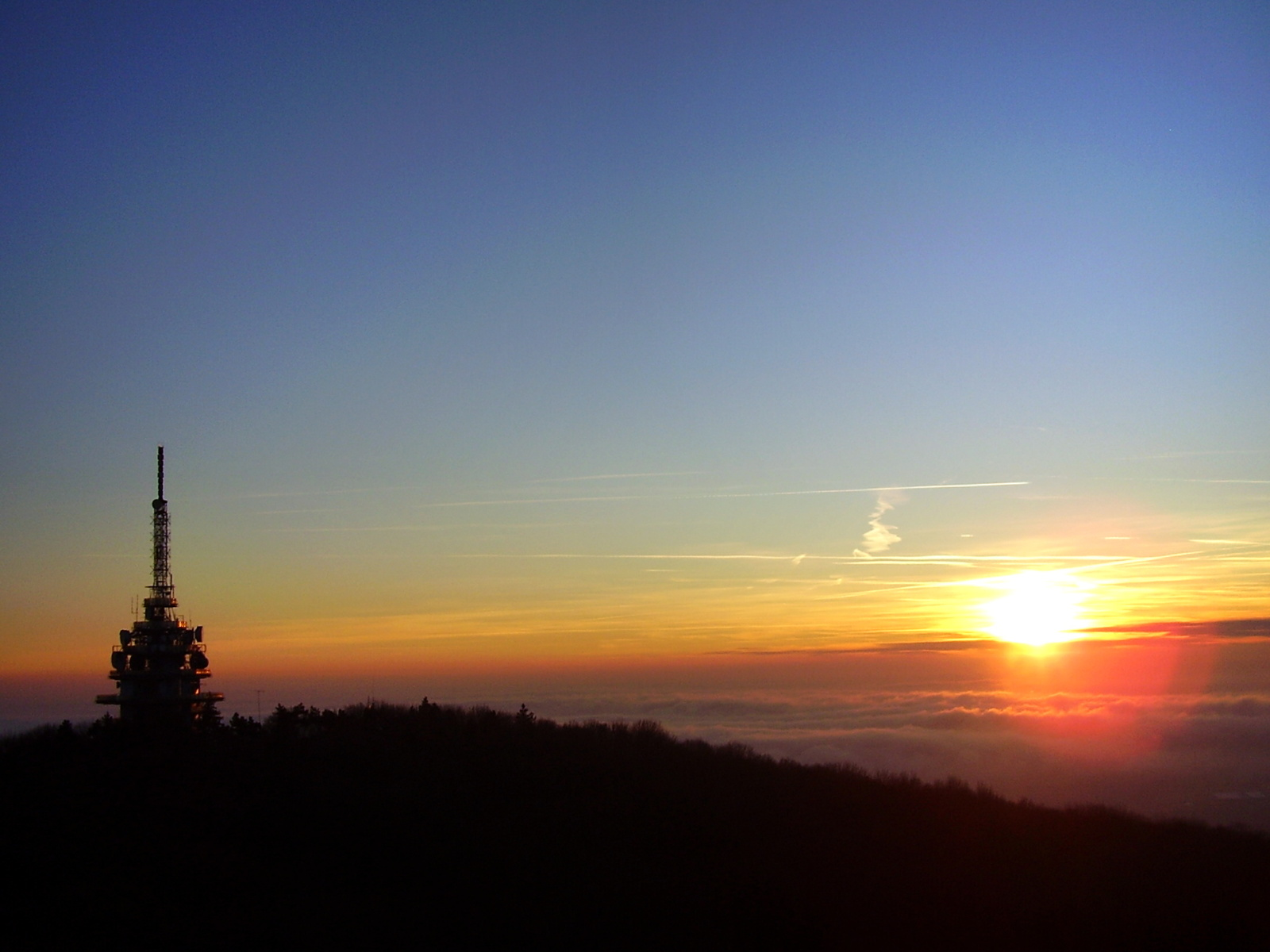
Zobor at sunset
