= Shlomo Goldman =

American rabbi (1947–2017)

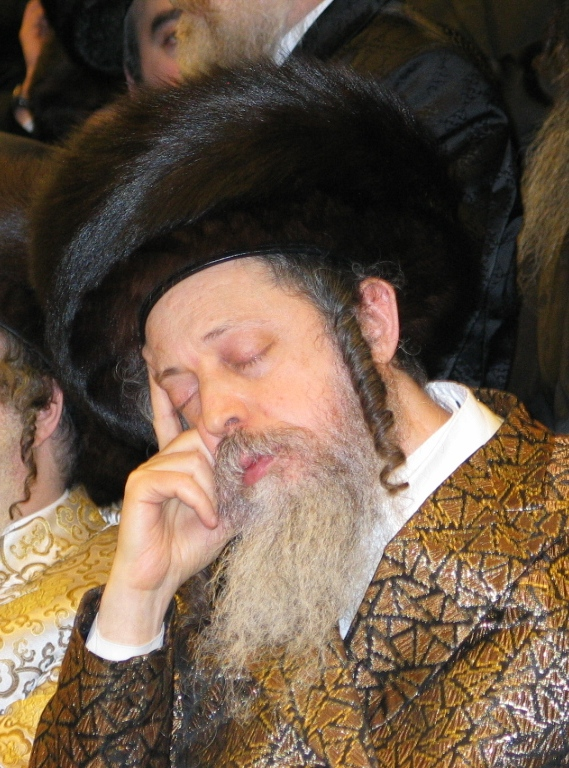
Rabbi Shlomo Goldman, Sanz Zviller Rebbe

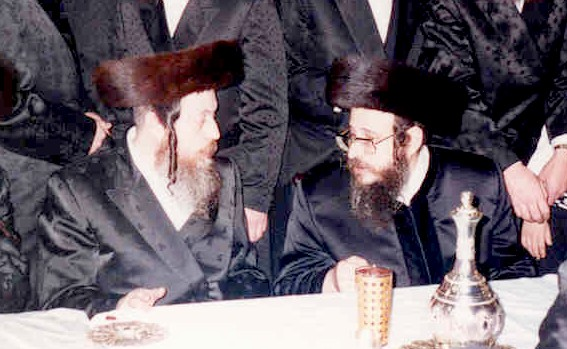
Rabbi Shlomo Goldman with his brother-in-law the Sanz Klausenburger Rebbe of New York

Shlomo Goldman (April 1, 1947 – July 21, 2017), also known as the Sanz Zviller rebbe, was an American rabbi. He was the Grand Rabbi of the Sanz-Klausenberger community in Union City, New Jersey, where he resided.

Goldman was the son of the previous Zviller Rebbe, Rabbi Mordchai Goldman, and a son-in-law of the late Sanz-Klausenburger Rebbe, Rabbi Yekusiel Yehudah Halberstam. Born in Jerusalem, he was designated to head the new hasidic community that was being established in Union City.

Goldman died on July 21, 2017.

== See also ==
- Klausenberg (Hasidic dynasty)
- Sanz (Hasidic dynasty)
- Zvhil (Hasidic dynasty)
