= Dinov =

Dinov is a surname. Notable people with the surname include:

- Ivo D. Dinov (born 1968), Bulgarian academic
- Todor Dinov (1919–2004), Bulgarian animator
