= Zobor =

Mountain in Slovakia

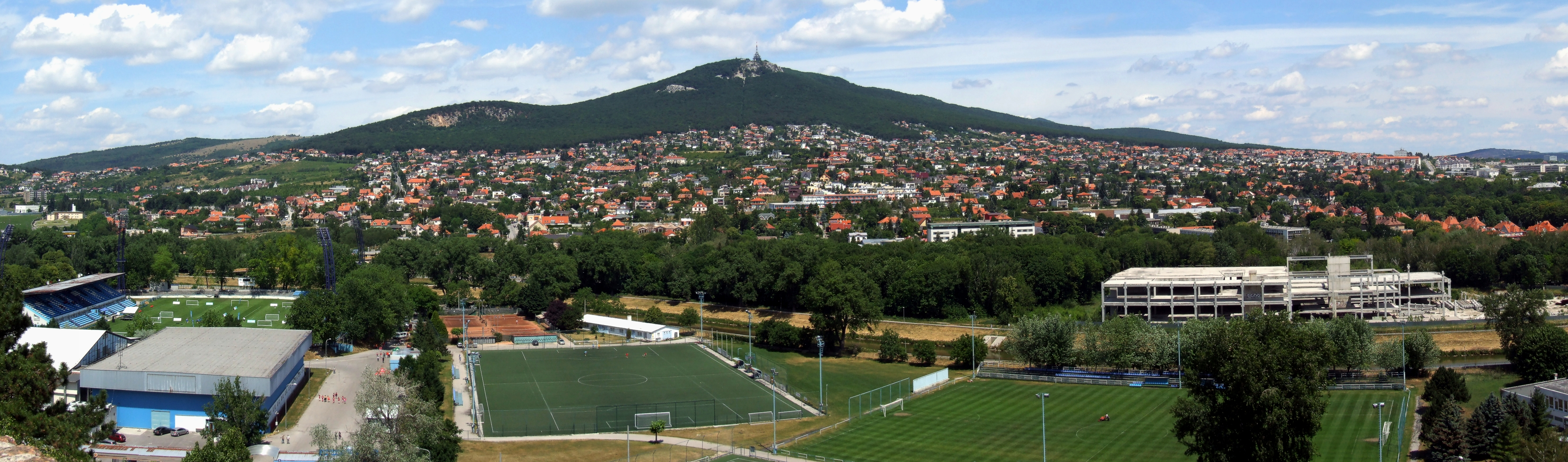

Highest point
- Elevation: 586.9 m (1,926 ft)
- Prominence: 174 m (571 ft)

Geography
- Country: Slovakia
- Region: Nitra
- District: Nitra
- Range coordinates: 48°20′47″N 18°6′32″E

Zobor (Slovak: Zobor) is a mountain in the Tribeč Mountains in Slovakia. It is located above the city of Nitra in the southernmost of Tribeč. The hill is mentioned in the Zobor Lists under the name "de Zuburiensis".

== Characteristics ==
Zobor is a peak in the Zoborská Tribeča group above the Danube Uplands and the city of Nitra, reaching an altitude of 586.9 m (1,926 ft) above sea level. The peak is part of the Zoborská lesostep nature reserve, with vineyards on the slopes. It is a viewpoint for the wider area. Until 1994, a chairlift ran here from Nitra, but it was shut down and devastated. It is currently largely dismantled for safety reasons, but construction of a new, slightly shorter cable car is being prepared.

Panoramic view from Zobor

== History ==
There are several archaeological sites here. At the top of the mountain was a prehistoric hillfort, which was probably used by the Slavs as a refuge in the 9th century (the perimeter of the ramparts was almost 3 kilometres (1.9 mi)). A Benedictine monastery was located to the southwest of the peak at the beginning of the 11th century, first mentioned in 1111 (Zoborské listiny); a school is mentioned here, which is the oldest documented school in Slovakia. The monastery may have been founded as early as the 9th century. Later, a Camaldolese monastery was founded in its place.

On the southeastern spur of Zobor there was a Slavic hillfort, which was founded at the end of the 8th century (an older church was found here under the foundations of the 11th century church). Together with the hillfort on the top of Zobor and other hillforts, they formed the basis of the settlement of Nitra in Great Moravia in the 9th century.

== See also ==
- Zobor transmitter
