= Kiryat Sanz, Netanya =

Neighborhood of Netanya

Coordinates: 32°20′46.5″N 34°51′25.82″E

Kiryat Sanz (Hebrew: קריית צאנז, also spelled Kiriat Tzanz) is a Haredi neighborhood located at the northwestern end of Netanya, Israel. Founded in 1956 by the previous Klausenburger Rebbe, Rabbi Yekusiel Yehudah Halberstam, who established his court there in 1960, Kiryat Sanz is the world center for Sanz-Klausenburg Hasidism. Halberstam's son and successor, Rabbi Zvi Elimelech Halberstam, known as the Sanzer Rebbe, holds his court here.

== History ==
In the 1950s, as the nascent State of Israel began building its population, the Klausenburger rebbe — who had emigrated to the United States in 1947 after surviving The Holocaust and living in displaced persons camps — applied to the Israeli government for land on which to build a Hasidic settlement for Holocaust survivors and chose land on the Netanya beachfront. for $1 million. Later the Israel Land Administration granted additional acreage to the budding community.

He laid the cornerstone for Kiryat Sanz on 4 March (21 Adar) 1956.

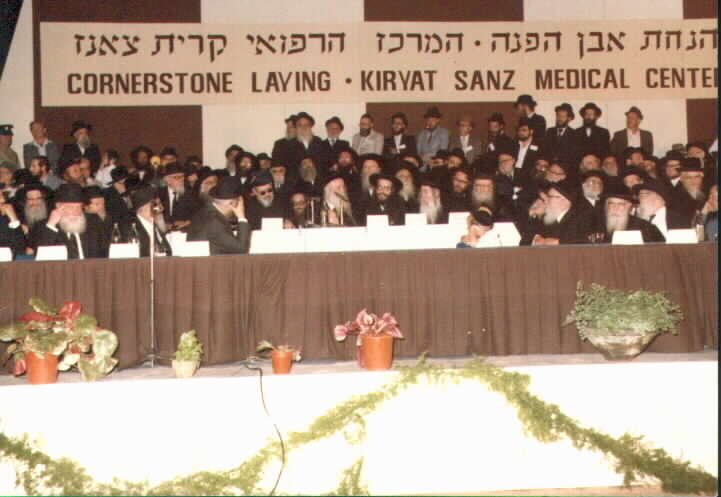
Laniado Hospital's cornerstone-laying in 1974. Yekusiel Yehudah Halberstam is at center left; his son Zvi Elimelech Halberstam is on his left.

In 1958 Halberstam laid the cornerstone for both the old-age home and the hospital; the former was completed in 1960, while the latter, which became known as Laniado Hospital, did not open until 1975. In addition to religious services, the new settlement had a diamond polishing factory built by a New York diamond merchant.

Halberstam, his family, and 50 followers moved to Israel to Kiryat Sanz on 20 December (19 Kislev) 1959. He died in Kiryat Sanz on 18 June 1994.

== 21st century ==
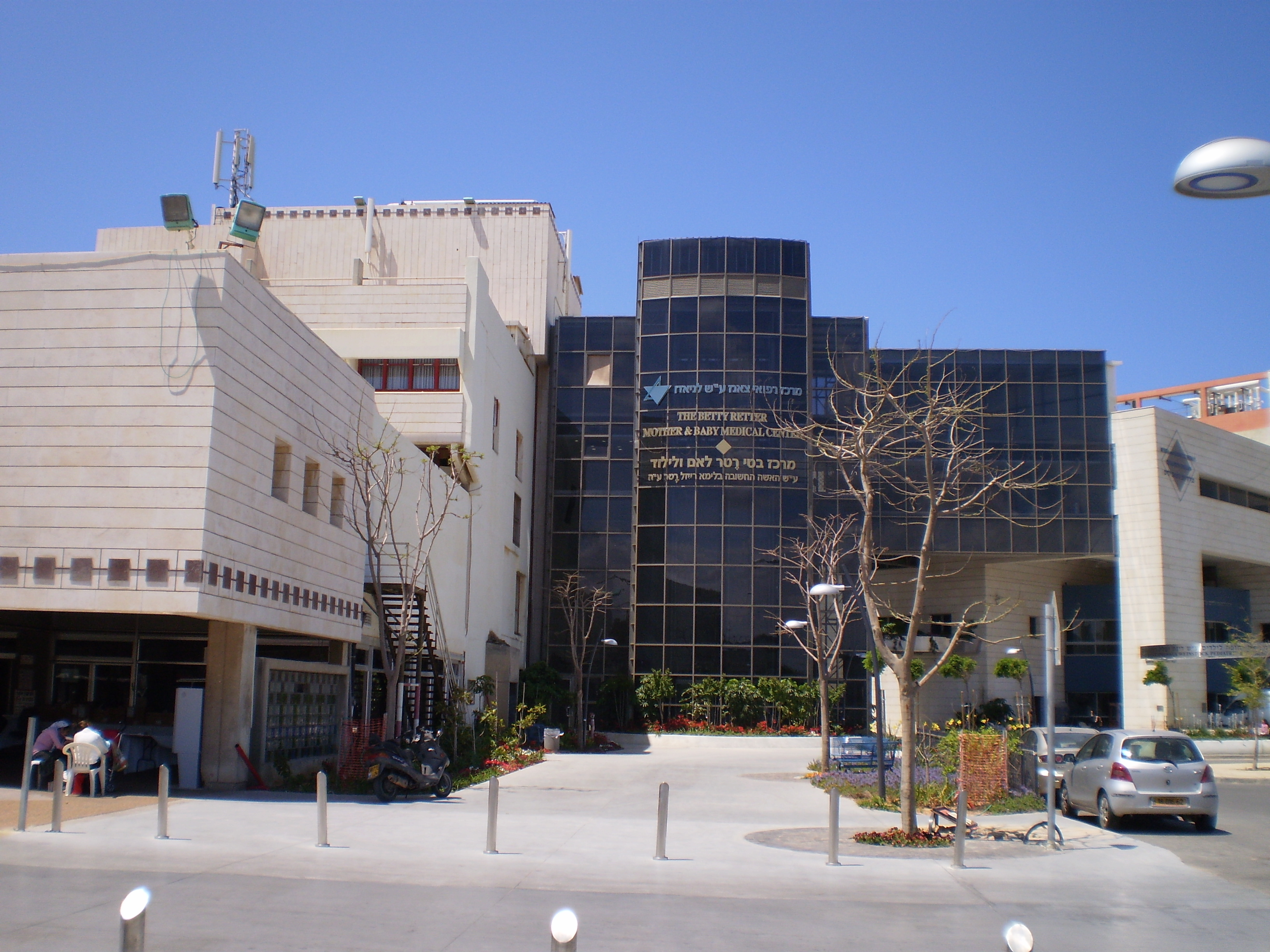
Laniado Hospital maternity wing.

Kiryat Sanz has a population of approximately 1500 families. As of 2006 most of the older residents were Holocaust survivors. It has schools, synagogues, a mikveh (ritual bath), a printing house, a religious hotel, a religious nursing school, and the Laniado Hospital, which encompasses two medical centers, a children's hospital, a geriatric center and a nursing school, serving a regional population of over 450,000.

Its beachfront was the first in Israel to schedule separate swimming hours for men and women.

Since the Rebbe's death in 1994, his eldest son, Rabbi Zvi Elimelech Halberstam, known as the Sanzer Rebbe, has been the spiritual leader of the Sanz community in Israel. From his home in Kiryat Sanz, he directs the Sanz Torah and chessed organizations in Netanya, Jerusalem, Bnei Brak, Petah Tikva, Haifa, Safed, Ashdod, Modiin, Beitar Illit, Tiberias, Elad, Monsey N.Y., Boro Park N.Y., Williamsburg N.Y, Lakewood N.J., and Union city N.J.. He is also directly responsible for all the institutions built by his father in Israel, including Laniado Hospital, where he serves as president.

== Landmarks ==
- Galei Sanz Hotel
- Laniado Hospital

== See also ==
- Kiryat Sanz, Jerusalem

== Sources ==
Lifschitz, Judah (2007). The Klausenberger Rebbe: Rebuilding. Targum Press. ISBN 978-1-56871-451-6.
