= Yekusiel Yehudah Halberstam =

American rabbi

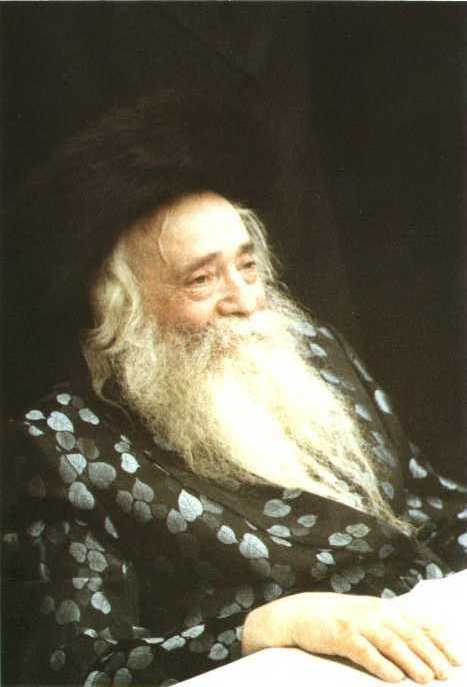
- Title: Klausenburger Rebbe

Personal life
- Born: Yekusiel Yehuda Halberstam; January 10, 1905 Rudnik, Austrian Galicia
- Died: June 18, 1994 (aged 89) Netanya, Israel
- Buried: Netanya, Israel
- Spouse: Pessel Teitelbaum, Chaya Nechama Ungar
- Children: 11 children, Zvi Elimelech Halberstam; Shmiel Dovid Halberstam; Miriam Leah; Mindy; Hindy; Yehudis; Suri Esther
- Parent: Tzvi Hirsh Halberstam (father)
- Dynasty: Klausenburg

Religious life
- Religion: Judaism

Jewish leader
- Successor: Zvi Elimelech Halberstam; Shmuel Dovid Halberstam
- Began: 1927
- Ended: June 18, 1994
- Main work: Shefa Chayim; Divrei Yatsiv
- Dynasty: Klausenburg

Yekusiel Yehudah Halberstam (Hebrew: יקותיאל יהודה הלברשטאם; January 10, 1905 – June 18, 1994) was a rebbe (hereditary rabbinical leader) of the Hasidic dynasty of Sanz-Klausenburg.

== Early life ==
Halberstam was born in 1905 in Rudnik, Austrian Galicia, in what is present-day Poland. He was a great-grandson (in the direct male line) of Chaim Halberstam, founder of the Sanz hasidic dynasty. When he was 13 his father, Tzvi Hirsch Halberstam, the rabbi of Rudnik, died.

In 1925, Halberstam married his second cousin, Pessel Teitelbaum. She was the daughter of Chaim Tzvi Teitelbaum and therefore the sister of Moshe Teitelbaum as well as the niece of Joel Teitelbaum.

In 1930, he became rabbi of a Nusach Sefard congregation in Klausenburg, Romania.

== Holocaust period ==
In 1941, a new law required all Jews living in Hungary to prove that their family had lived in and paid taxes in Hungary back to 1851. Halberstam, his wife, and their eleven children were arrested and brought to Budapest, where the family was separated. He was jailed with a group of leaders who were later sent to Auschwitz, but he was released and the family returned to Kolozsvár.

On 19 March 1944, the Germans invaded Hungary and Hungarian Jews were confined to ghettos and then deported to the Auschwitz death camp. The Klausenburg ghetto was established on 1 May 1944, and was liquidated via six transports to Auschwitz between late May and early June.

Halberstam fled to the town of Nagybánya, where he was conscripted into a forced-labor camp along with 5,000 other Hungarian Jews.

About a month after his arrival the Nazis took over Hungary. He was sent to Auschwitz, where his wife and nine of their children who remained with her in Klausenburg had been sent several months earlier. They did not survive. Halberstam was assigned to a work unit in the Warsaw Ghetto and later was sent to the Dachau concentration camp as a slave laborer, and then to the Muldorf Forest, where the Nazis were building an underground airport and missile batteries. In the spring of 1945 the Germans disbanded the Muldorf camp and sent the inmates on a death march from which the survivors, including Halberstam, were liberated by Allied troops in late April.

Halberstam's wife and ten of his children were murdered by the Nazis during World War II. His eldest son survived the war but died of illness in a refugee camp soon after. After Allied liberation, the Klausenberger Rebbe met Dwight D. Eisenhower and criticized Allied failure to bomb the death camps and train tracks leading to them, insisting it could have saved millions of Jewish lives.

In spring 1946 he went to the United States, where he established his court in the Williamsburg section of Brooklyn, New York, in 1947.

== Remarriage ==
On Friday, August 22, 1947, he married his second wife, Chaya Nechama Ungar, the daughter of Rabbi Shmuel Dovid Ungar. They had five daughters and two sons.

== Kiryat Sanz, Netanya ==
In 1958 Halberstam established the Kiryat Sanz neighborhood in Netanya, Israel, and moved there from Brooklyn in 1960. He also established the Kiryat Sanz neighborhood of Jerusalem.

In 1968 he founded another Sanz community in Union City, New Jersey, and afterwards divided his time between that community and Netanya.

=== Laniado Hospital ===
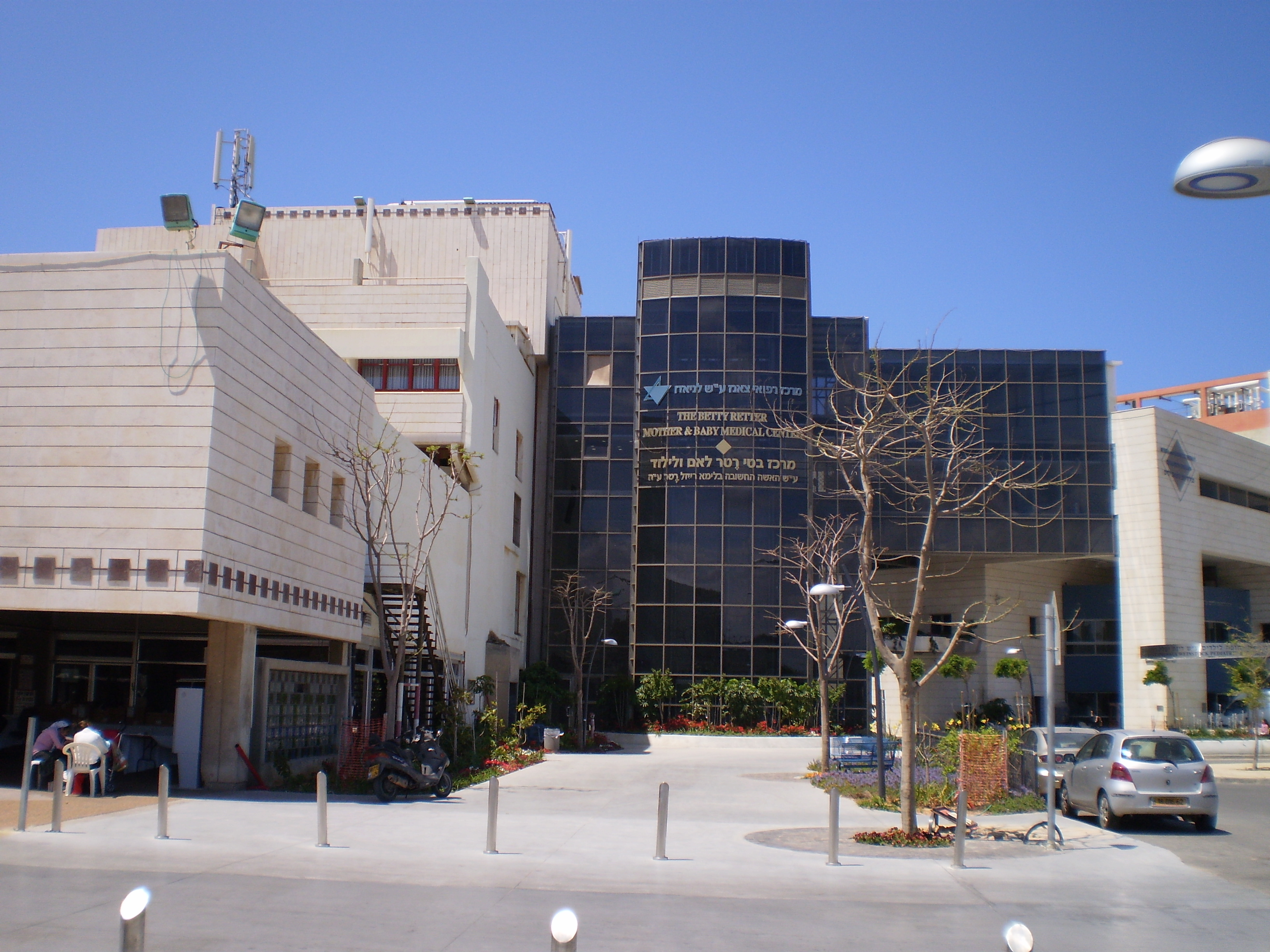
Laniado Hospital maternity wing.

Halberstam established Laniado Hospital, a voluntary, not-for-profit 484-bed hospital in Kiryat Sanz, Netanya.

The hospital's first building, an outpatient clinic, opened in 1975. The hospital includes two medical centers, a children's hospital, a geriatric center and a nursing school, serving a regional population of over 450,000.

== Death and succession ==
Halberstam died on 10 June 1994, and was buried in Netanya. In his will, he divided leadership of the Sanzer Hasidim between his two sons: his elder son, Zvi Elimelech Halberstam, became the rebbe of Netanya; Samuel David Halberstam became the rebbe of Brooklyn.

A biography about his life was published by Artscroll titled "The Klausenburger Rebbe", in English.

== Sources ==
- Lifschitz, Judah. The Klausenberger Rebbe: The War Years. Targum Press, Inc., 2003. ISBN 1-56871-219-7
- Rabinowicz, Tzvi M. Hasidism in Israel: A History of the Hasidic Movement and Its Masters in the Holy Land. New York: Jason Aronson, 2000. ISBN 0-7657-6068-1
