= Klausenburg (Hasidic dynasty) =

Romanian Hasidic dynasty

Klausenburg Hasidic Dynasty
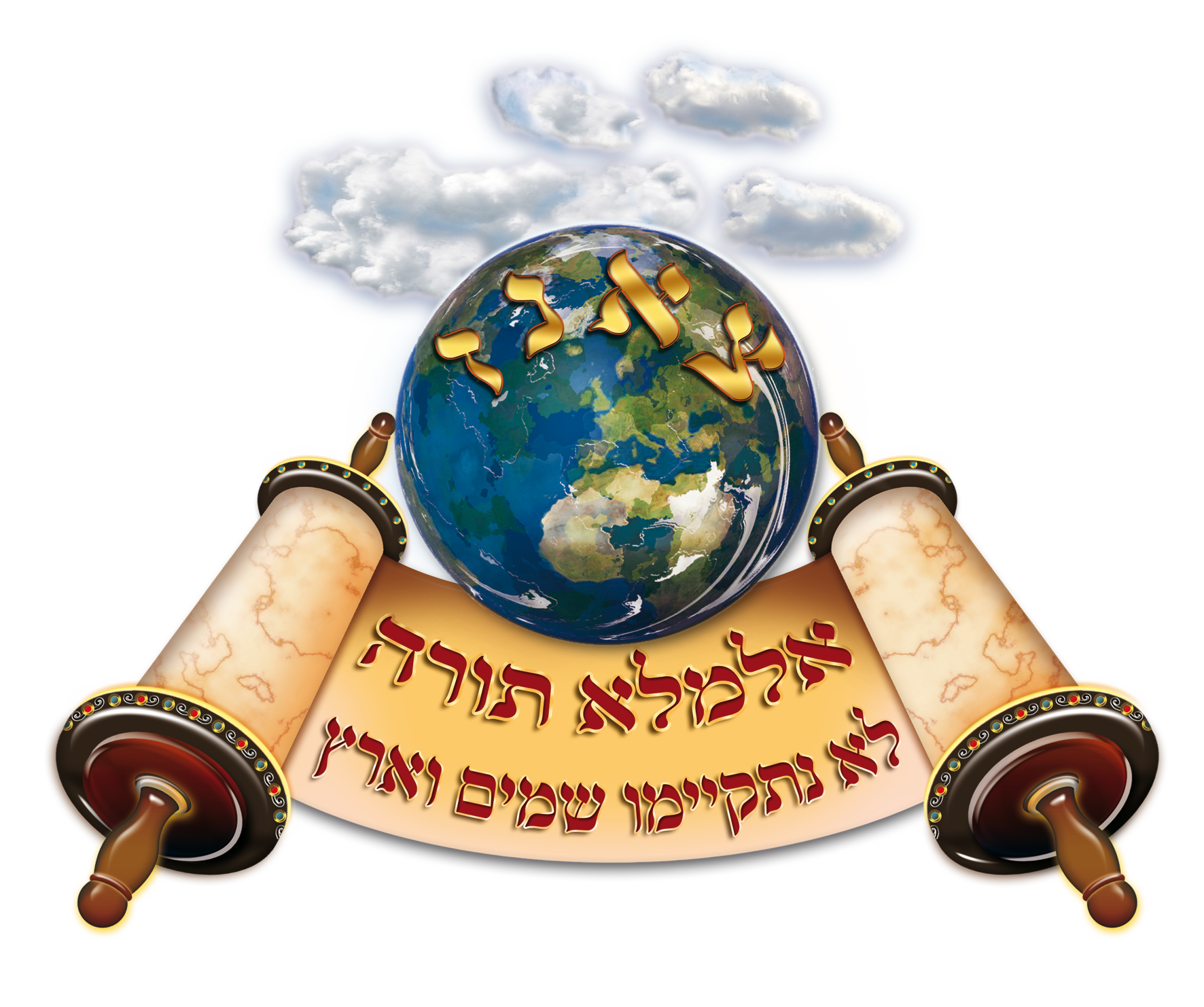
- The Sanz-Klausenburg Logo

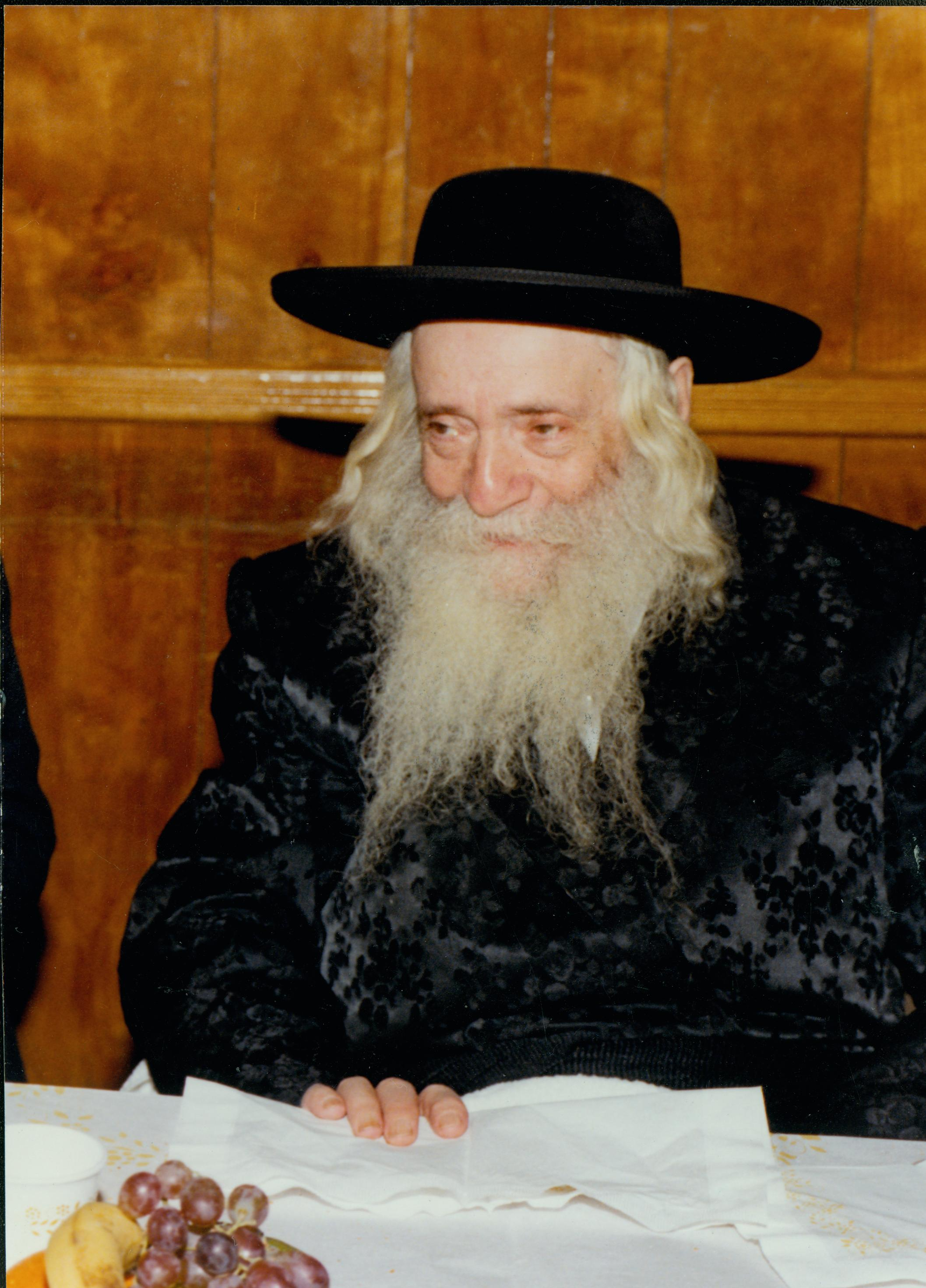
- Founder of the dynasty, the Rebbe the Shefa Chaim

Founder
- Yekusiel Yehudah Halberstam

Regions with significant populations
- Israel, United States, Canada, England, Europe, Australia

Religions
- Hasidic Judaism

Klausenburg, also known as Sanz-Klausenburg, is a Hasidic dynasty that originated in the Transylvanian city of Cluj-Napoca (German: Klausenburg, Hungarian: Kolozsvár), today in Romania.

At the behest of Rabbi Yekusiel Yehudah Halberstam, Klausenburger Rebbe from 1927 to 1994, the movement was split into two separate movements after his death, headed by his two sons. The Sanz-Klausenburger Hasidim are located in Borough Park, New York City, while the Sanzer Hasidim are based in Kiryat Sanz, Netanya, Israel. There are also followings in Los Angeles, California; Jerusalem; Stamford Hill, London; Antwerp; and Union City, New Jersey, and in the US, in Borough Park, Williamsburg, Monsey, and Lakewood.

== Sanz-Klausenburg rabbinical lineage ==
The Klausenburger Rebbes are descended from Rabbi Chaim Halberstam of Sanz, who was a disciple of Rabbi Naftoli Tzvi of Ropshitz. Rabbi Naftoli was a disciple of Rebbe Elimelech of Lizhensk author of Noam Elimelech. Rebbe Elimelech was a disciple of Rebbe Dovber, the Maggid (Preacher) of Mezritch, the primary disciple of the Baal Shem Tov, the founder of Hasidism.

Grand Rabbi; Chaim Halberstam of Sanz (1793–1876) author of Divrei Chaim
Grand Rabbi; Yekusiel Yehudah Halberstam (1905-1994); First Klausenburger Rebbe author of Shefa Chayim and Divrei Yatsiv
Grand Rabbi; Boruch Halberstam of Gorlitz (1829-1906)
Grand Rabbi; Zvi Elimelech Halberstam; Sanz-Klausenburger Rebbe of Kiryat Sanz, Netanya, Israel	Grand Rabbi; Shmuel Dovid Halberstam; Sanz-Klausenburger Rebbe of Borough Park, Brooklyn
Rabbi; Tzvi Hirsh Halberstam of Rudnik (1851-1918)

== History ==
The Klausenburger dynasty was founded by Rabbi Yekusiel Yehudah Halberstam in 1927, when he assumed the position of rabbi of Klausenburg, the capital city of Transylvania in western Romania. Halberstam was the great-grandson of Rabbi Chaim of Sanz, founder of the Sanz Hasidic dynasty.

Yekusiel Yehudah Halberstam grew up in Rudnik, Poland.

In the Holocaust about 85% of the community was murdered, including Halberstam's wife and eleven children. He emerged as a leader in the displaced persons camps in Europe as he created a communal survivors organization called She'aris Hapleitah ("the surviving remnant"), which operated religious schools for boys and girls and yeshivas for young men in 19 different DP camps, as well as religious services.

In 1947, he emigrated to America and established his court in the Williamsburg section of Brooklyn.

In 1957 he established the Kiryat Sanz neighborhood in the beachside city of Netanya, Israel. He moved to Kiryat Sanz in 1960. In 1968, he founded yet another Sanz community in Union City, New Jersey, and afterwards divided his time between that community and his residence in Netanya.

Halberstam died on June 18, 1994, and was buried in Netanya. In his will, he divided leadership of the Klausenburger Hasidim between his two sons (both born in his second marriage after World War II). His elder son, Zvi Elimelech Halberstam, became the Sanz-Klausenburger Rebbe (also called Sanzer Rebbe) of Netanya, and Shmuel Dovid Halberstam became the Sanz-Klausenburger Rebbe of Brooklyn.

== Leadership ==
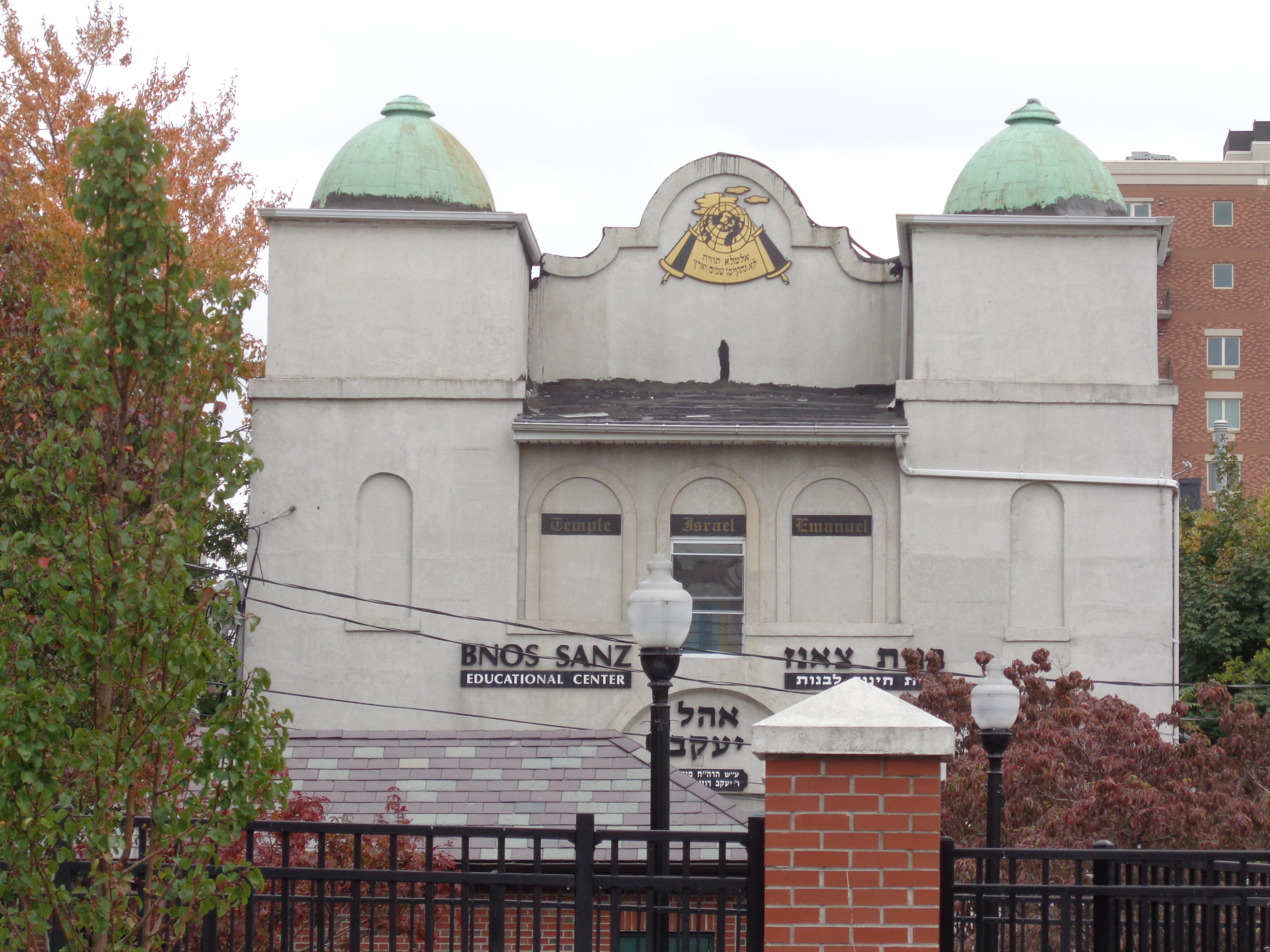
Bnos Sanz, Union City

- Grand Rabbi Tzvi Elimelech Halberstam is the Sanz-Klausenburger Rebbe in (Kiryat Sanz, Netanya,) Israel
  - Rabbi Yechezkel Shraga Boruch Halberstam, son of Rabbi Zvi Elimelech, is Rav haTso'ir
- Grand Rabbi Shmuel Dovid Halberstam, is the Sanz-Klausenburger Rebbe in Borough Park,

The Rebbe's sons-in-law are:

- The Late Grand Rabbi Shlomo Goldman, the Zhviller Rebbe, of Union City, NJ
- Rabbi Berel Weiss, Rav of Kiryat Sanz, Jerusalem
- Rabbi Fishel Mutzen, Rav of Kiryat Baal Shem Tov in Petah Tikva
- Rabbi Shaul Yehuda Prizant, Rav of the Sanz-Klausenburg community in Union City, New Jersey; and rosh mesivta Yeshivat Shaar Efraim Monsey
- Rabbi Eliezer Duvid Shapiro, Rav of the Sanz community in Bnei Brak

In contrast to the custom among many Rebbes, the Klausenburger Rebbe did not take sons-in-law exclusively from rabbinic families; rather, he chose the best students of his yeshiva to marry his daughters. The only exception was Rabbi Shlomo Goldman, an accomplished Torah scholar even in his youth, who is the son of the previous Zhviller Rebbe in Israel.

Other prominent figures in Sanz-Klausenburg are:

- Rabbi Fishel Hershkowitz, the Holeiner Rov, is the Sanz-Klausenburger Dayan in Williamsburg
- Rabbi Aaron Weider, the Linzer Rav (d. 2010), was a long-standing dayan of the Sanz-Klausenburger rabbinical court in America. His daughter Tzipora married Grand Rabbi Shmuel Dovid Halberstam
- Rabbi Paskez, a long-time Rebbi in Yeshiva Torah Vodaas who was the Segan (assistant) of Rabbi Aaron Wieder, is the current Dayan in Boro Park.
- Rabbi Eliyahu Shmuel Schmerler, rosh yeshiva of the Sanz yeshiva in Kiryat Sanz, Netanya
