= 1968 SANFL Grand Final =

Sturt	Port Adelaide
12.18 (90)	9.9 (63)
	1	2	3	4
STU	3.3 (21)	5.11 (41)	10.13 (73)	12.18 (90)
PTA	3.4 (22)	4.4 (28)	6.6 (42)	9.9 (63)
- Date: Saturday, 28 September (2:10 pm)
- Stadium: Adelaide Oval
- Attendance: 57,811

The 1968 SANFL Grand Final was an Australian rules football competition. Sturt beat Port Adelaide by 90 to 63.

== Teams ==
Sturt
B:	8 Paul Bagshaw	21 Bruce Jarrett	16 Brenton Adcock
HB:	18 Brian Schwarz	11 Phil Nelson	9 Terry Short
C:	22 Trevor Clarke	1 Bob Shearman (a-c)	13 Daryl Hicks
HF:	7 John Tilbrook	10 Rick Schoff	5 Brenton Miels
F:	2 Keith Chessell	24 Brian Martin	29 Peter Endersbee
Foll:	20 Tony Clarkson	6 John Murphy (a-vc)	4 Roger Rigney
Int:	19 Tony Burgan	32 Malcolm Hill	
Coach:	Jack Oatey		

Port Adelaide
B:	32 Trevor Obst	4 Ron Elleway	13 Bob Philp
HB:	31 Neville Thiele	10 Bob Clayton	14 Dennis Errey
C:	26 Bruce Light	1 John Cahill (c)	24 Bruce Nyland
HF:	15 Doug Spiers	9 Peter Yeo	11 Ross Haslam
F:	32 Peter Obst	7 Russell Ebert	12 Greg Leal
Foll:	4 Kevin Salmon	13 Wayne Broadbridge	22 Jeff Potter (v-c)
Int:	18 Eric Freeman	28 Dan Pritchard	
Coach:	Fos Williams		

== Scorecard ==
1968 SANFL Grand Final
Saturday, 28 September	Sturt	def.	Port Adelaide	Adelaide Oval (crowd: 57,871)
3.3 (21); 5.11 (41); 10.13 (73); 12.18 (90)	Q1; Q2; Q3; Final	3.4 (22); 4.4 (28); 6.6 (42); 9.9 (63)
Endersbee — 4 Miels, Schoff, Tilbrook — 2 Chessell, Clarkson — 1	Goals	Freeman — 2 Leal, Nyland, Haslam, Philp, Spiers, Potter, P. Obst — 1
Bagshaw, Murphy, Schoff, Clarkson, Endersbee	Best	Elleway, Nyland, T. Obst, Thiele, P. Obst, Potter
