= 1965 SANFL Grand Final =

- Official program cover.

Port Adelaide	Sturt
12.8 (80)	12.5 (77)
	1	2	3	4
PA	3.3 (21)	6.3 (39)	11.7 (73)	12.8 (80)
STU	2.1 (13)	6.2 (38)	7.2 (44)	12.5 (77)
- Date: Saturday, 2 October (2:10 pm)
- Stadium: Adelaide Oval
- Attendance: 62,543
- Umpires: Ken Cunningham

Accolades
- Australian Football Hall of Fame: 1. Jack Oatey (1996; Legend); 2. Fos Williams (1996); 3. John Cahill (2002); 4. Geof Motley (2002); 5. Paul Bagshaw (2016); 6. John Halbert (2017)

The 1965 SANFL Grand Final was an Australian rules football game contested between the Port Adelaide Football Club and the Sturt Football Club, held at the Adelaide Oval in Adelaide on 2 October 1965. It was the 67th annual Grand Final of the South Australian National Football League, staged to determine the premiers of the 1965 SANFL season. The match, attended by 62,543 spectators, was won by Port Adelaide by a margin of 3 points, marking that club's 23rd premiership.

The attendance of 62,543 was a record attendance at Adelaide Oval, and stood for 51 years until the Adele concert of 2017. It remains the record attendance for a sporting event at Adelaide Oval.

== Teams ==
Port Adelaide
B:	27. Kevin Salmon	4. Ronald Elleway	14. Bob Fabian
HB:	12. Bob Elix	6. Graham Cooper	17. Geof Motley (c)
C:	24. Bruce Nyland	14. John Cahill (vc)	1. Dennis Errey
HF:	11. Douglas Spiers	18. Eric Freeman	25. Peter Mead
F:	3. Trevor Obst	30. Reg Beaufoy	13. Bob Philp
Foll:	8. Steven Traynor	7. David Gill	21. Jeff Potter
Int:	19. Graham Matters	9. Richie Bray	
Coach:	Fos Williams		

Sturt
B:	Brenton Adcock	Bruce Jarrett	John Murphy
HB:	Terry Short	Brian Schwarz	Neville Cunningham
C:	Darryl Hicks	Rick Schoff	Trevor Clarke
HF:	Thomas	John Halbert	John Tilbrook
F:	Malcolm Hill	M.S. Jones	Roger Dunn
Foll:	Tony Clarkson	Paul Bagshaw	Roger Rigney
Int:	M.E. Jones	Leigh Whicker	
Coach:	Jack Oatey		

== Scorecard ==
1965 SANFL Grand Final
Saturday, 2 October	Port Adelaide	def.	Sturt	Adelaide Oval (crowd: 62,543)
3.3 (21); 6.3 (39); 11.7 (73); 12.8 (80)	Q1; Q2; Q3; Final	2.1 (13); 6.2 (38); 7.2 (44); 12.5 (77)
Freeman — 3 Potter, Mead — 2 Beaufoy, Obst, Cahill, Philp, Traynor — 1	Goals
