= Frucht =

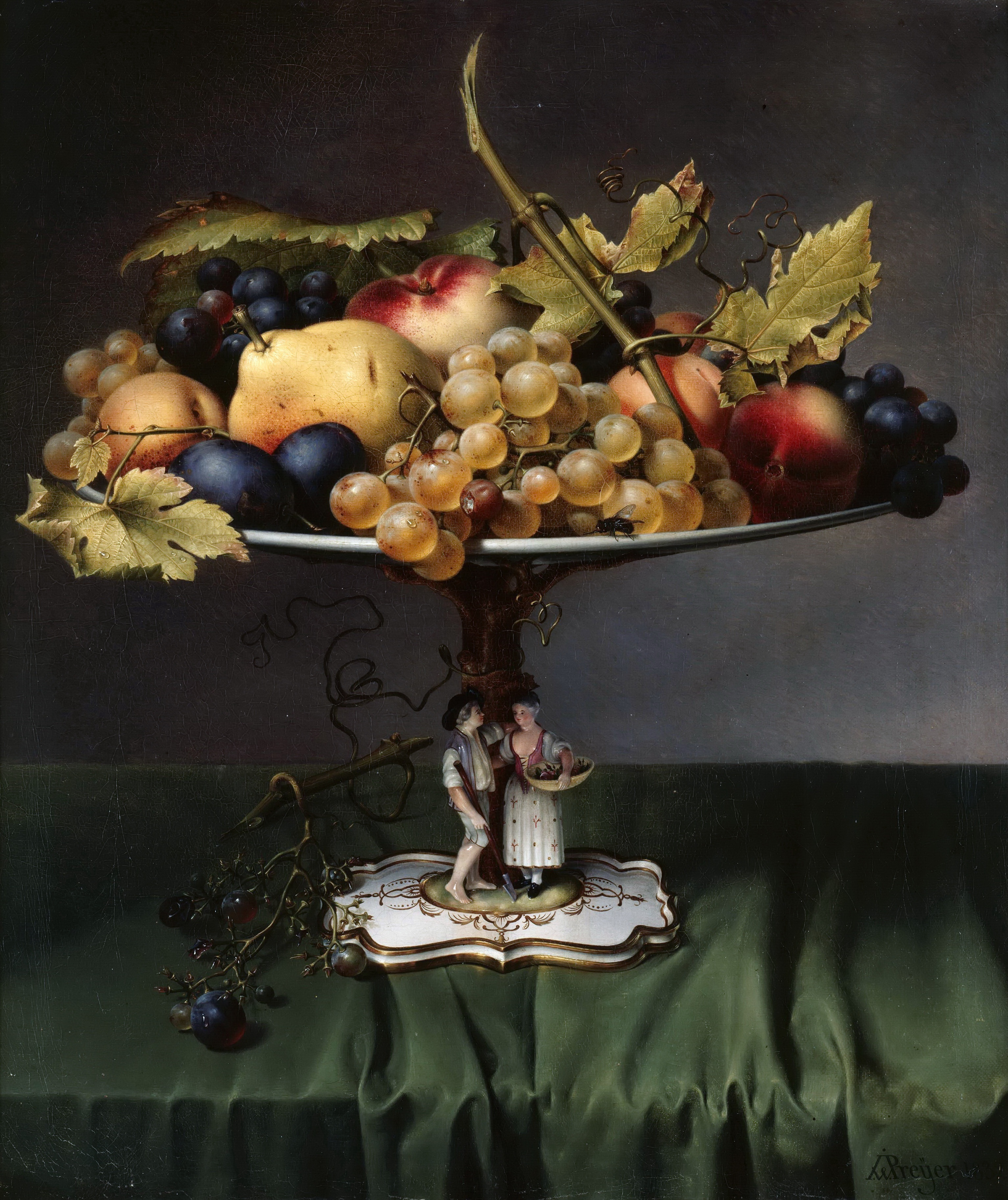

Origin
- Languages: German, Yiddish
- Meaning: fruit
- Region of origin: Germany, Israel

Other names
- Variant forms: Fruchter, Früchter (Frikhter), Fruchtner, Fruchtler, Fruchtbaum, Fruchtenbaum, Fruchtmann (Fruchtman, Frukhtman), Fruchtenmann, Fruchtermann, Fruchtsam, Fruchthändler, Fruchtenberg, Fruchtenbrod (Fruchtenbrodt); Obst, Obstbaum, Hobsbawm; Blumenfrucht, Goldfrucht, Gottfrucht (< Gottfurcht), Rosenfrucht Similar surnames: Furcht, Fürchtner, Fürchtegott, Furchtgott (Furkhtgot, Furkhgot, Furchgott)

Frucht is surname of:

- Adolf-Henning Frucht (1913, Torgau - 1993), German doctor and physiologist
- Michael Frucht (1969-), an American neurologist
- Robert (Roberto) Wertheimer Frucht (1906 - 1997), a German-Chilean mathematician

- Frucht graph
- Frucht's theorem

== See also ==
- Frucht Quark
- Frücht, a small municipality in the federal state of Rhineland-Palatinate in western Germany
