= List of old boys of St Peter's College, Adelaide =

List of former pupils of St Peter's College, Adelaide

This is a list of notable former pupils of St Peter's College, Adelaide, an Anglican boys' school in Adelaide, South Australia.

== Nobel laureates ==
- Lawrence Bragg, physicist and co-recipient of the 1915 Nobel Prize in Physics
- Howard Florey, pharmacologist and co-recipient of the 1945 Nobel Prize in Physiology or Medicine
- Robin Warren, pathologist and co-recipient of the 2005 Nobel Prize in Physiology or Medicine

== Business ==
- James Hardy, yachtsman and winemaker who skippered three America's Cup campaigns
- Essington Lewis, industrialist

== Clergy ==
- Ian George, former Anglican Archbishop of Adelaide
- Harold Eustace Sexton, former Anglican Archbishop of British Columbia

== Entertainment and the arts ==
- Walter Bagot, architect and co-founder of Woods Bagot
- Greg Champion, singer and songwriter
- Sam Clark, actor and musician known for Neighbours
- Keith Conlon, television and radio presenter
- David Dridan, landscape painter and gallery director
- Francis Greenslade, actor and writer
- Scott Hicks, film director
- Peter Meakin, journalist and television executive
- Peter Muller, architect
- Tim Phillipps, actor
- Richard Tipping, poet and visual artist

== Judges, politicians and public servants ==
- Harold David Anderson, diplomat
- John Bannon, Premier of South Australia from 1982 to 1992
- Henry Barwell, Premier of South Australia from 1920 to 1924
- John Cox Bray, Premier of South Australia from 1881 to 1884
- Richard Butler, Premier of South Australia in 1905
- Guy Debelle, Reserve Bank of Australia deputy governor from 2016 to 2022
- John Downer, Premier of South Australia from 1885 to 1887 and 1892 to 1893
- Don Dunstan, Premier of South Australia from 1967 to 1968 and 1970 to 1979
- Frederick Holder, Premier of South Australia in 1892 and from 1899 to 1901
- Denzil Ibbetson, administrator in British India
- George Leake, Premier of Western Australia in 1901 and 1901–1902
- Tom Lewis, Premier of New South Wales from 1975 to 1976
- Ian McLachlan, Australian minister for defence from 1996 to 1998
- George John Robert Murray, Chief Justice of South Australia from 1916 to 1942
- John Northmore, Chief Justice of Western Australia from 1931 to 1945
- Arthur Rymill, Lord Mayor of Adelaide from 1950 to 1953
- James Stevens, member of the Australian House of Representatives for Sturt from 2019 to 2025
- David Tonkin, Premier of South Australia from 1979 to 1982

== Medicine and the sciences ==
- Michael Alpers, medical researcher known for work on kuru
- Arthur Cudmore, surgeon
- Warren Ewens, mathematical geneticist and statistician known for Ewens's sampling formula
- Richard Harris, anaesthetist, joint Australian of the Year in 2019 and Lieutenant Governor of South Australia
- Basil Hetzel, medical researcher
- Hugh Possingham, conservation scientist and mathematician
- Andy Thomas, NASA astronaut
- Joseph Verco, physician and conchologist

== Military ==
- Francis Walter Belt, soldier, lawyer and explorer
- Arthur Seaforth Blackburn, Australian soldier awarded the Victoria Cross in 1916
- Harold Greenway, military officer and recipient of the Distinguished Service Order and Croix de Guerre
- Guy George Egerton Wylly, Australian soldier awarded the Victoria Cross in 1900

== Sports ==
- Nathan Adcock, cricketer and former captain of the South Australian Redbacks
- Bryan Beinke, former Australian Football League footballer for Adelaide
- Michael Cranmer, South Australian cricketer
- Phil Davis, former AFL footballer and co-captain of Greater Western Sydney
- Bob Elix, former Australian rules footballer and Northern Territory football administrator
- John Flood, medical practitioner and cricketer who represented Ireland
- Henry Frayne, Olympic long jumper and triple jumper
- Tom Harley, former Geelong premiership captain and Australian Football League chief operating officer
- David Hayes, horse trainer
- Will Hayward, AFL footballer for Carlton, formerly of Sydney
- Riley Knight, former AFL footballer for Adelaide
- Philip Lee, Test cricketer and footballer for Norwood
- Oscar McGuinness, Australian representative rower
- Andrew McKay, former AFL footballer for Carlton
- Gillon McLachlan, chief executive of the Australian Football League from 2014 to 2023
- Hamish McLachlan, sports broadcaster
- Will Minson, former AFL footballer for the Western Bulldogs
- Aidan Murphy, Australian sprinter
- Lachie Neale, AFL footballer and winner of the 2020 and 2023 Brownlow Medals
- Darren Ng, former basketball player for the Adelaide 36ers
- Rod Owen-Jones, Olympic water polo player at the 2000 Summer Olympics
- Alex Ross, Australian cricketer
- Dylan Stephens, AFL footballer for North Melbourne
- Hayden Stoeckel, Olympic swimmer and silver and bronze medallist at the 2008 Summer Olympics
- Richard Twopeny, Australian rules footballer involved in founding the South Australian Football Association in 1877
- Peter Yeo, former Australian rules footballer for Port Adelaide, Sturt and Melbourne
