= Obst =

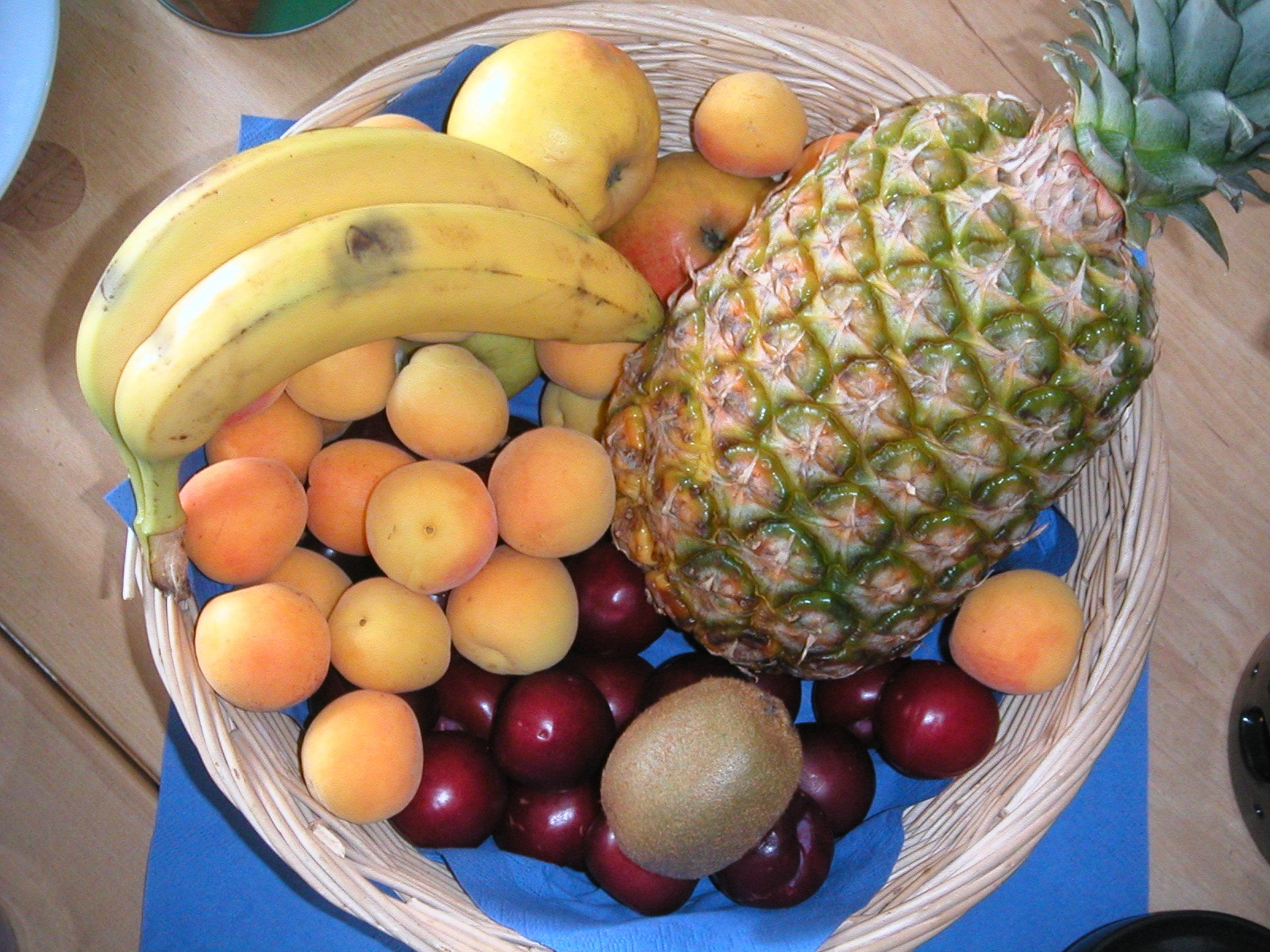

Origin
- Language: German
- Meaning: fruit
- Region of origin: Central Europe

Other names
- Variant forms: Obster, Obstler, Hobsbawm, Baum, Frucht, Fructus

Obst is a German language surname, which means "fruit". It may refer to:

- Alan Obst (born 1987), Australian football player
- Andreas Obst (born 1996), German basketball player
- Andrew Obst (born 1964), Australian football player
- Chris Obst (born 1979), Australian football player
- David Obst (born 1946), American literary agent
- Erich Obst (1886–1981), German geographer
- Henry Obst (1906–1975), American football player
- Herbert Obst (born 1936), Canadian fencer
- Lynda Obst (born 1950), American film producer
- Marie-Therese Obst (born 1996), German-born Norwegian javelin thrower
- Michael Obst (rower) (born 1944), German rower
- Michael Obst (composer) (born 1955), German composer
- Peter Obst (1936–2017), Australian football player
- Sam Obst (born 1980), Australian rugby league player
- Seweryn Obst (1847- 1917), Polish painter, illustrator and ethnographer
- Trevor Obst (1940–2015), Australian football player
- Tania Obst, Head coach Adelaide Thunderbirds netball team
