= Attendance records at the Adelaide Oval =

Stadium attendance

This article includes attendance records for various types over events at the Adelaide Oval, in Adelaide, South Australia.

== Some notable events ==
The "Grand Corroboree" was a corroboree performed by around 100 Aboriginal men and women from Point MacLeay mission and Yorke Peninsula on Friday 29 and Saturday 30 May 1885. It was witnessed by 20,000 spectators.

The motorcade for the 1927 Royal Tour of Australia by the Duke and Duchess of York attracted between 60 and 70,000 spectators.

In 1942, 25,000 locals attended an American football match at Adelaide Oval as part of American Independence Day celebrations.

A record crowd of 62,543 attended the 1965 SANFL Grand Final, witnessing Port Adelaide 12.8 (80) defeat Sturt 12.5 (77).

A 2017 Adele concert attracted an audience of 70,000.

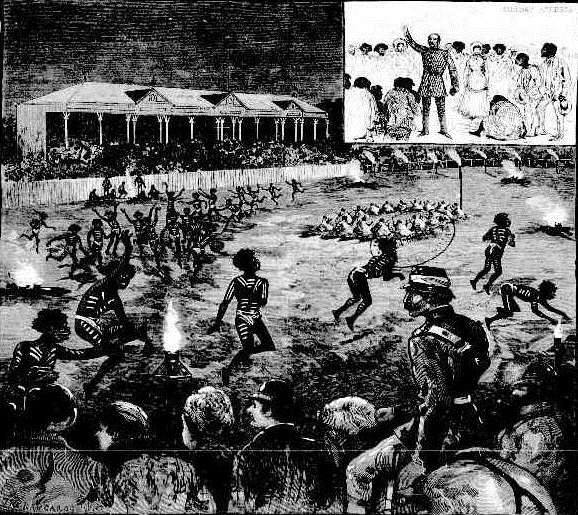
Aboriginal corroboree (1885)

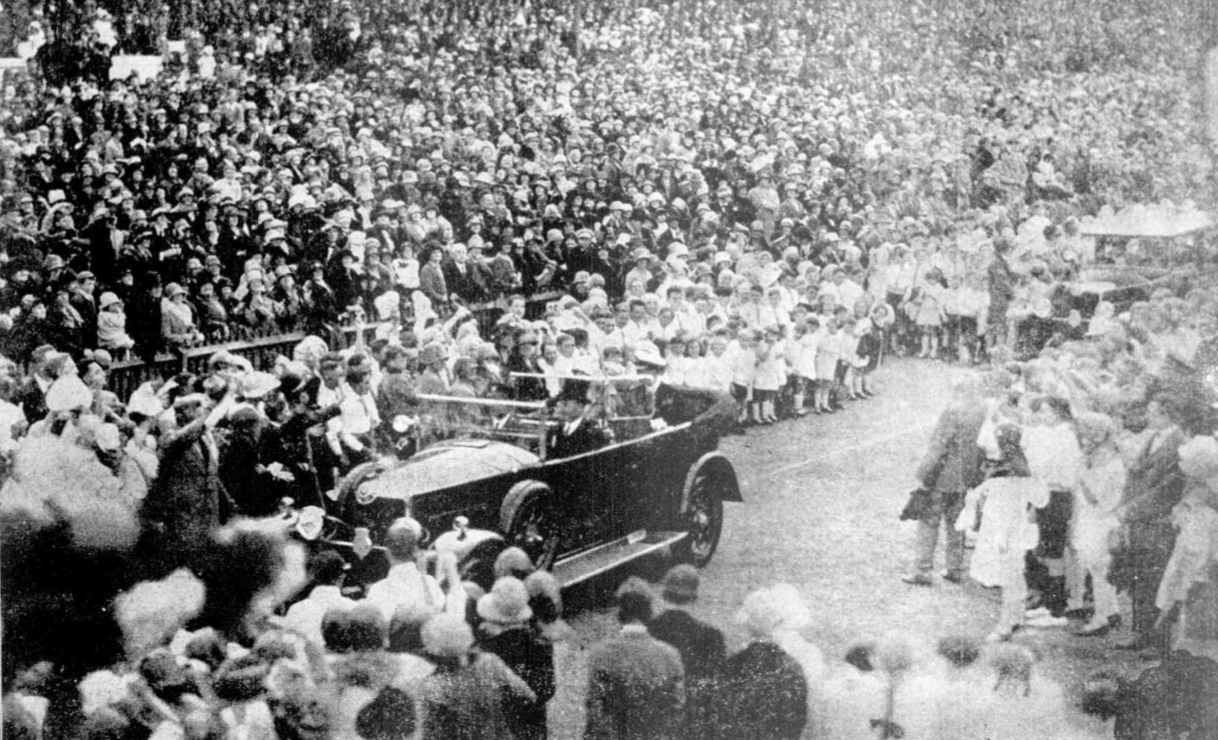
Motorcade, 1927 Royal Tour

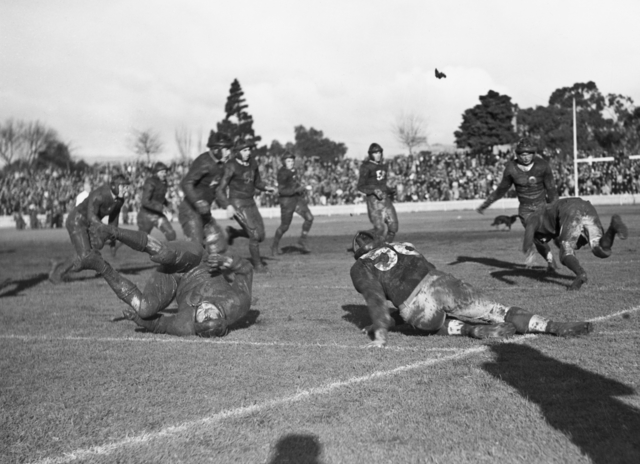
American football (1942)

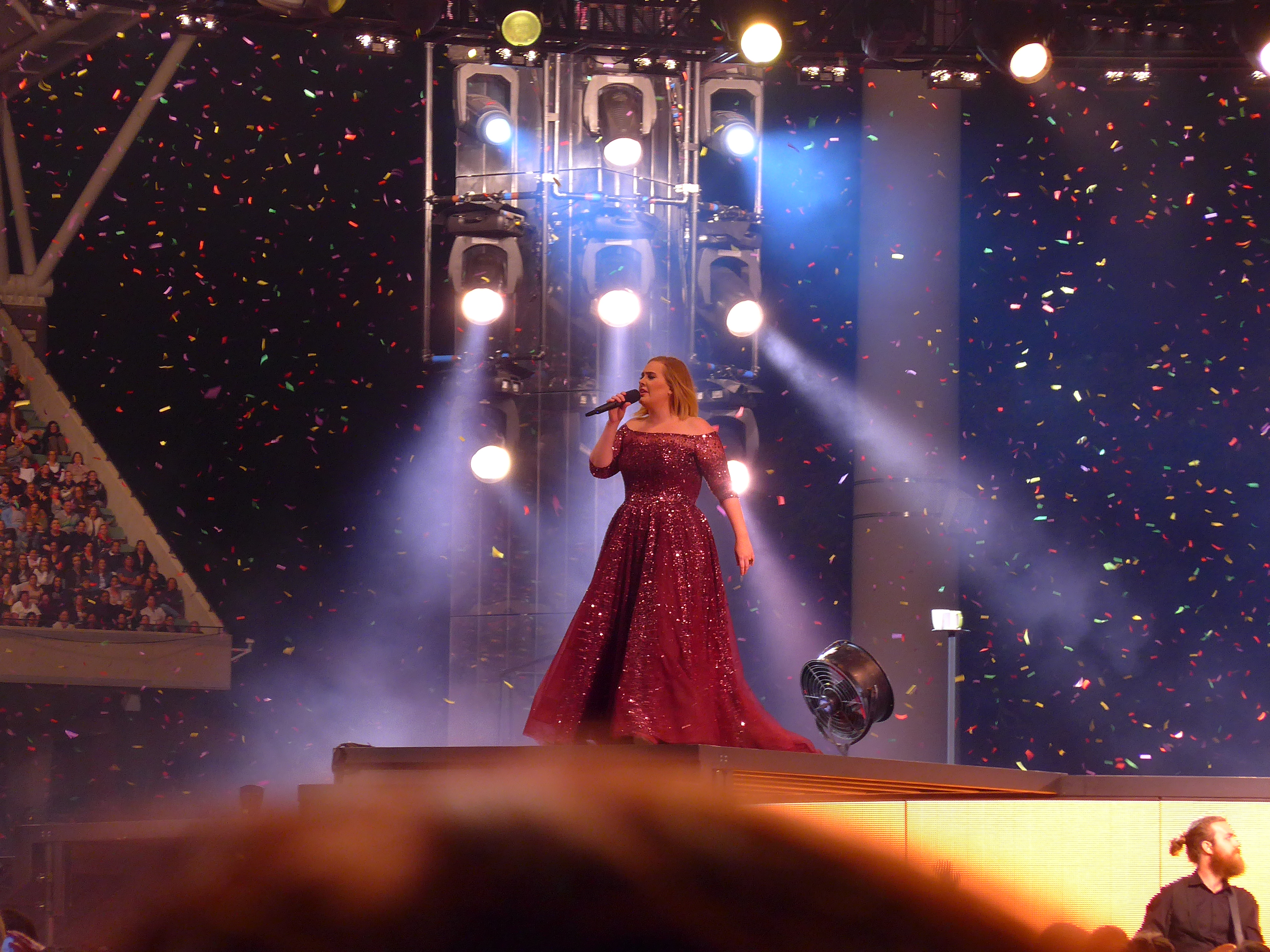
2017 Adele concert

== Top attendance records ==
Many other events have attracted large crowds. Some of those are listed below.

=== Outright ===
No.	Crowd	Date	Participants	Event	Series
1	70,000	2017 March 13	Adele	Concert	Adele Live 2017
2	67,000	2018 March 7	Ed Sheeran	Concert	÷ Tour
3	62,543	1965 October 2	Port Adelaide def. Sturt	Australian rules football	1965 SANFL Grand Final
4	60,000	1927 May 3	Duke and Duchess of York	Motorcade	1927 Royal Tour
5	59,417	1966 October 1	Sturt def. Port Adelaide	Australian rules football	1966 SANFL Grand Final
6	58,924	1957 September 28	Port Adelaide def. Norwood	Australian rules football	1957 SANFL Grand Final
7	58,849	1967 September 30	Sturt def. Port Adelaide	Australian rules football	1967 SANFL Grand Final
8	57,811	1968 September 28	Sturt def. Port Adelaide	Australian rules football	1968 SANFL Grand Final
9	56,525	1973 September 29	Glenelg def. North Adelaide	Australian rules football	1973 SANFL Grand Final
10	56,298	2025 December 17	Australia vs England	Cricket	2025–26 Ashes series

=== By event type ===
Attendance records by event type
No.	Crowd	Date	Participants	Event	Series
1	70,000	2017 March 13	Adele	Concert	Adele Live 2017
2	62,543	1965 October 2	Port Adelaide def. Sturt	Australian rules football	1965 SANFL Grand Final
3	60,000	1927 May 3	Duke and Duchess of York	Motorcade	1927 Royal Tour
4	56,298	2025 December 17	Australia vs England	Cricket	2025–26 Ashes series
5	53,008	2015 July 20	Adelaide United def. by Liverpool F.C.	Soccer	2015 Liverpool Tour
6	48,613	2023 May 31	Queensland def. New South Wales	Rugby league	2023 State of Origin series
7	34,000	2000 May 24	Archbishop Leonard Faulkner	Religious Gathering	Catholic Schools Jubilee
8	30,203	2003 October 26	Ireland def. Argentina	Rugby union	2003 Rugby World Cup
9	25,000	1941 July 4	"Bears" def. "Packers"	American football	United States Army
10	20,000	1885 May 30	Aboriginal dancers	Aboriginal corroboree	Two-night corrobee

=== Sport ===
==== All ====
Top 10 all time sports attendances
No.	Crowd	Date	Teams	Sport	Competition
1	62,543	1965 October 2	Port Adelaide def. Sturt	Australian rules football	1965 SANFL Grand Final
2	59,417	1966 October 1	Sturt def. Port Adelaide	Australian rules football	1966 SANFL Grand Final
3	58,924	1957 September 28	Port Adelaide def. Norwood	Australian rules football	1957 SANFL Grand Final
4	58,849	1967 September 30	Sturt def. Port Adelaide	Australian rules football	1967 SANFL Grand Final
5	57,811	1968 September 28	Sturt def. Port Adelaide	Australian rules football	1968 SANFL Grand Final
6	56,525	1973 September 29	Glenelg def. North Adelaide	Australian rules football	1973 SANFL Grand Final
7	56,353	1964 October 30	South Adelaide def. Port Adelaide	Australian rules football	1964 SANFL Grand Final
8	56,298	2025 December 17	Australia vs England	Cricket	2025–26 Ashes series
9	55,709	1972 September 30	North Adelaide def. Port Adelaide	Australian rules football	1972 SANFL Grand Final
10	55,600	1969 October 4	Sturt def. Glenelg	Australian rules football	1969 SANFL Grand Final

==== Excluding cricket and Australian rules football ====
Top 10 non-Australian rules football or cricket sports attendance records
No.	Crowd	Date	Teams	Sport	Competition
1	53,008	2015 July 20	Adelaide United def. by Liverpool F.C.	Soccer	2015 Liverpool Tour
2	52,912	2024 May 31	Australia drew with China	Soccer	International friendly
3	50,119	2016 May 1	Adelaide United def. Western Sydney Wanderers	Soccer	2016 A-League Grand Final
4	48,613	2023 31 May	Queensland def. New South Wales	Rugby league	2023 State of Origin series
5	46,291	2024 October 10	Australia def. China PR	Soccer	2026 FIFA World Cup qualification
6	35,439	2016 March 24	Australia def. Tajikistan	Soccer	2018 FIFA World Cup qualification
7	33,126	2014 October 17	Adelaide United drew with Melbourne Victory	Soccer	2014–15 A-League
8	30,203	2003 October 26	Ireland def. Argentina	Rugby union	2003 Rugby World Cup
9	29,785	2017 June 8	Australia def. Saudi Arabia	Soccer	2018 FIFA World Cup qualification
10	28,884	1991 June 28	St George Dragons def. Balmain Tigers	Rugby league	1991 NSWRL season

=== Concerts ===
Top 10 musical acts/events attendance records
No.	Crowd	Date	Artist(s)	Name of tour/event
1	70,000	13 March 2017	Adele	Adele Live 2017
2	62,915	7 March 2018	Ed Sheeran	÷ Tour
3	54,115	25 October 2014	The Rolling Stones	14 On Fire
4	50,000	26 November 1996	Michael Jackson	HIStory World Tour
4	50,000	21 November 2015	AC/DC	Rock or Bust World Tour
6	46,600	5 November 2025	Metallica	M72 World Tour
7	45,650	11 November 1978	David Bowie	Isolar II
8	42,484	26 February 2020	Queen + Adam Lambert	The Rhapsody Tour
9	41,569	2 March 2010	AC/DC	Black Ice World Tour
10	40,000	1 December 1993	Madonna	The Girlie Show World Tour
