= John Flood =

John Flood may refer to:

- John Flood (academic), UK-Australian legal sociologist
- John Flood (cricketer) (1883–1929), Australian born, Irish cricketer
- John Flood (Fenian) (1835–1909), Irish revolutionary
- John Flood (footballer, born 1932), English footballer with Southampton and Bournemouth
- John Flood (footballer, born 1960), Scottish footballer with Sheffield United, Airdrieonians and Partick Thistle
- John Joe Flood (1899–1982), Irish footballer
- John H. Flood (1939–2016), Massachusetts sheriff and politician
- John H. Flood Jr. (1878–1958), mining engineer and unpublished Wyatt Earp biographer
