= Halberstam =

Halberstam (Yiddish: האלבערשטאם, Hebrew: הלברשטם) is a Jewish surname, used by several branches of the Halberstadt family.

Halberstam, meaningless in its current form, is altered from an older name, Halberstadt, used by many descendants of Rabbi Tzvi Hirsh (died 1748), the rabbi of Halberstadt.

The change of Halberstadt to Halberstam is often thought to have been implemented by Rabbi Chaim Halberstam of Sanz (Nowy Sącz), as implied by Rabbi Yechezkel Michelsohn of Płońsk, in his biography of Rabbi Tzvi Hirsh Halberstadt and his descendants, who records the rabbi of Sanz's displeasure at bearing the name of a non-Jewish settlement as his motive. However, even first and second cousins of the rabbi of Sanz are known to have borne the modified name, implying that the change was made at least two generations before him. Joseph Kwadrat believes that Halberstadt was modified to Halberstam (or, in one branch, to Halberthal) by members of the family then residing in Galicia to conform with the surname adoption laws of the Austrian Empire.

== Notable people with the surname ==
- Ari Halberstam (1977–1994), Yeshiva student killed in the 1994 Brooklyn Bridge shooting
- Ben Zion Halberstam (1874–1941), Grand Rebbe of Bobov (1905–1941)
- Ben Zion Aryeh Leibish Halberstam (born 1954), Bobover Rebbe
- Chaim Halberstam (1793–1876), of Sanz, founder of the Sanz dynasty. Known commonly as the Divrei Chaim
- Chaim Halberstam, descendant of the 'Divrei Chaim' of Sanz, Congregational Rabbi and clinical psychologist
- David Halberstam (1934–2007), American journalist and author
- David J. Halberstam (1951-2026), American sports announcer
- Devorah Halberstam, American anti-terrorism and gun control activist
- Dovid Halberstam (1821–1894), founder of the Chrzanow Hasidic dynasty
- Heini Halberstam (1926–2014), mathematician, the Elliott–Halberstam conjecture is named partially after him
- Judith Halberstam (born 1961), Professor of English and Director of The Center for Feminist Research at University of Southern California
- Michael J. Halberstam (1932–1980), American cardiologist and author
- Moshe Halberstam (1932–2006), member of the Edah Charedis Rabbinical court of Jerusalem
- Naftali Halberstam (1931–2005), Grand Rebbe of Bobov (2000–2005)
- Samuel David Halberstam, Klausenberg Rebbe of Borough Park, Brooklyn
- Shlomo Halberstam (first Bobover rebbe) (1847–1905), founder of the Bobov Hasidic dynasty
- Shlomo Halberstam (third Bobover rebbe) (1907–2000), Grand Rebbe of Bobov (1941–2000)
- Solomon Joachim Halberstam (1832–1900), Austrian Jewish scholar
- Yechezkel Shraga Halberstam (1813–1899), Polish rabbi
- Yekusiel Yehudah Halberstam (1905–1994), Orthodox rabbi and founding rebbe of the Klausenberger dynasty
- Zvi Elimelech Halberstam (born 1952), Klausenberg Rebbe of Netanya
