= Brad Ebert =

Australian rules footballer

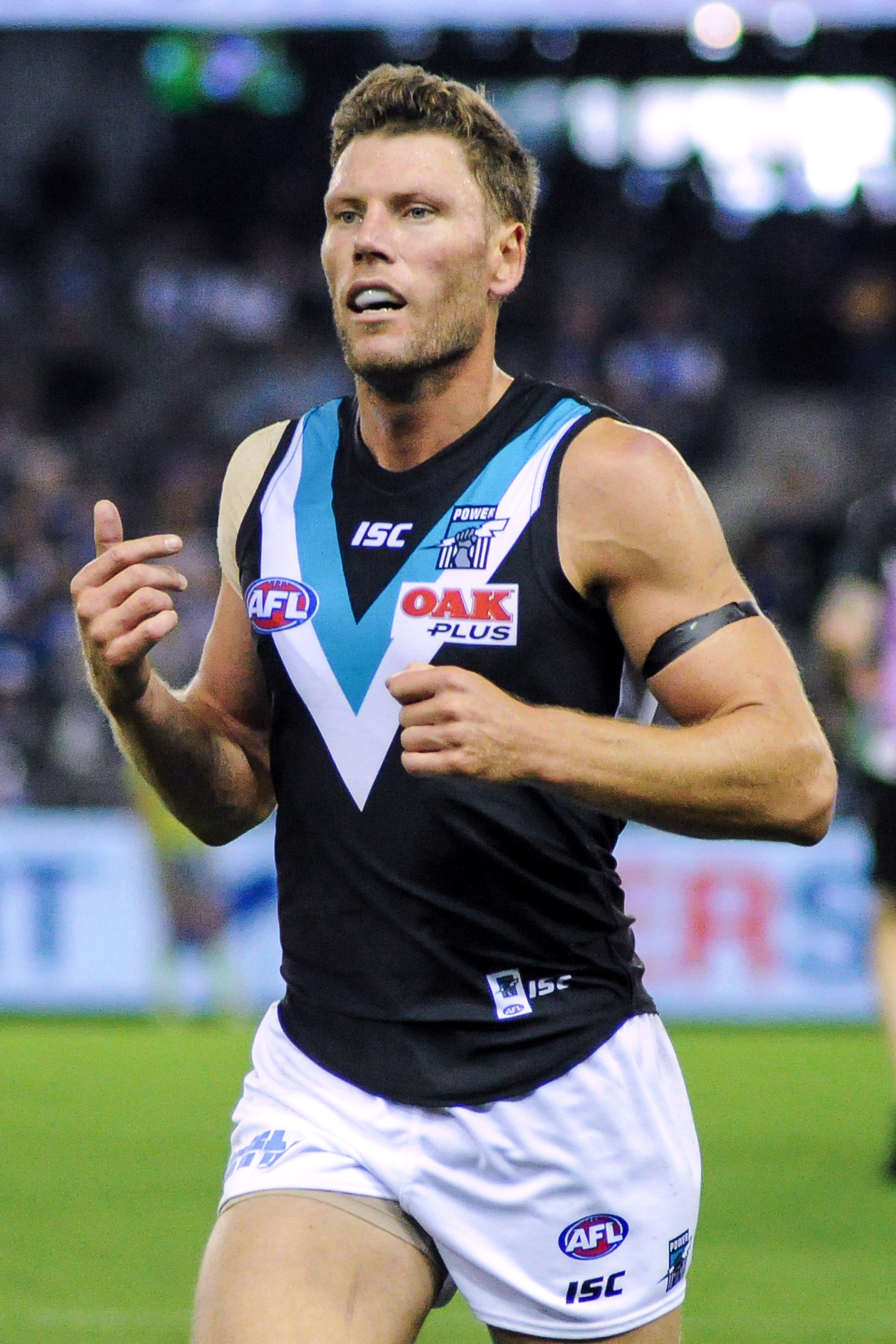
- Ebert playing for Port Adelaide in June 2018

Personal information
- Full name: Bradley Ebert
- Born: 2 April 1990 (age 36)
- Original team: Port Adelaide (SANFL)
- Draft: No. 13, 2007 national draft
- Height: 189 cm (6 ft 2 in)
- Weight: 90 kg (198 lb)
- Positions: Midfield, half-forward flank

Playing career^{1}
Years	Club	Games (Goals)
2008–2011	West Coast	76 (33)
2012–2020	Port Adelaide	184 (107)
Total		260 (140)
- ^{1} Playing statistics correct to the end of 2020.

Career highlights
- AFL Rising Star nominee 2008; Fos Williams Medal 2012

Bradley Ebert (born 2 April 1990) is a former Australian rules footballer who played in the Australian Football League (AFL) for the West Coast Eagles and Port Adelaide.

His father Craig Ebert played 112 games for Port Adelaide during the 1980s. He is the nephew of Russell Ebert.

== Career ==
=== West Coast (2008–2011) ===
The son of Craig Ebert, a former West Adelaide and Port Adelaide player, and the nephew of Russell Ebert, Ebert was drafted with the 13th pick overall by the West Coast Eagles in the 2007 national draft, having previously played for Port Adelaide in the South Australian National Football League (SANFL). This selection caused some controversy in South Australia as Adelaide were expected to selected Ebert with pick 10, but instead chose Patrick Dangerfield, a Victorian. Ebert had also captained South Australia at the 2007 Under-18 Championships.

Ebert made his debut for West Coast in round two of the 2008 season while still a 17-year-old, becoming the youngest Eagles debutant since Daniel Kerr in 2001. He played 15 matches in his debut season, and was nominated for the 2008 AFL Rising Star after a 25-disposal three-goal game in round 17 against St Kilda. Ebert played 17 matches in 2009 and every game in 2010 playing mainly as an inside midfielder, playing with Peel Thunder in the West Australian Football League (WAFL) when not playing with the Eagles.

In 2011, Ebert was switched from the midfield to the half-forward flank. He played 22 games, kicking 14 goals, including a career-high four goals against Richmond in round 20, but was dropped twice after struggling for form. He requested to be traded to Port Adelaide in October 2011, with the trade being completed on 17 October.

=== Port Adelaide (2012–2020) ===
In 2012, Ebert had a breakout year for Port Adelaide. His hard playing style and consistency quickly made him well liked from the Port Adelaide supporters. Brad Ebert had many stand out performances during the year, for example in round 22 against Brisbane he finished with 32 disposals(24 kicks 8 hballs) 3 marks and 4 tackles. Ebert finished the year playing all 22 games for the season and kicking 17 goals. His consistency lead to many off field achievements also, such as finishing equal second alongside Matthew Broadbent in the Port Adelaide Best and Fairest, and finishing the highest of all Port players in the Brownlow Medal.

At the start of 2013, Ebert announced as the vice-captain of Port Adelaide. Ebert played in every game in 2013 averaging 23.1 disposals a game.

For season 2014, Ebert recorded exactly the same number of disposals and goals as 2013. In season 2015, he once again played in every game for the club.

In 2016, Ebert missed his first game since crossing over to Port Adelaide due to injury.

In 2017, he played his 200th AFL game in a 51-point win over Hawthorn.

At the conclusion of the 2020 AFL season, Ebert announced his retirement from the AFL.

After retirement, Ebert remained with Port Adelaide as a member of its football department subcommittee until 2022. He joined Carlton as a development coach in 2023.

== Personal life ==
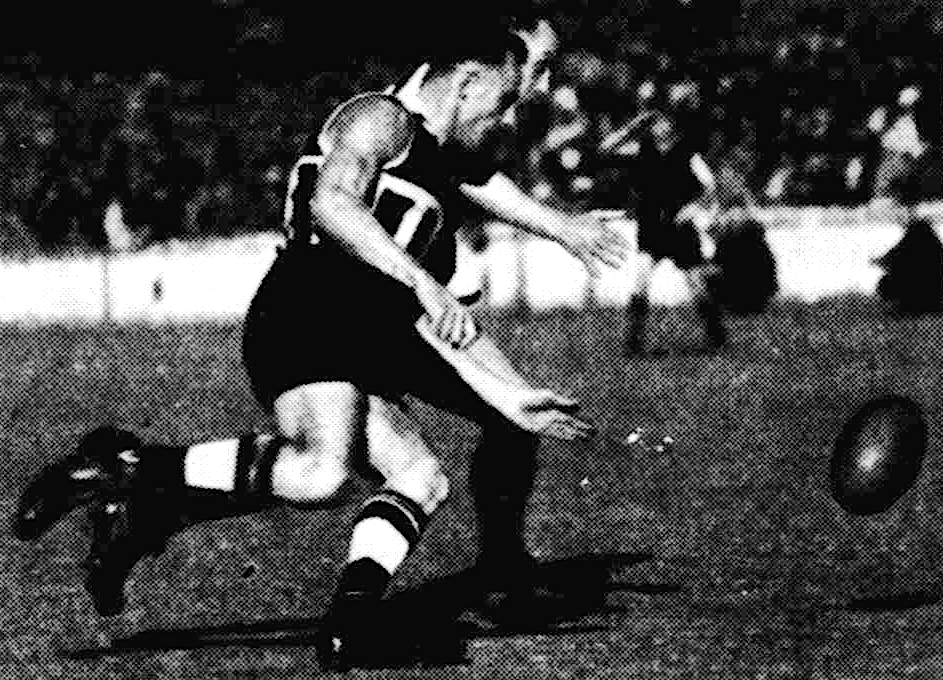
Brad Ebert's great-grandfather was Ken Obst who played for Port Adelaide from 1933 to 1943.

Brad Ebert is part of a well known South Australian and Port Adelaide football family.

His father Craig Ebert played over 100 games for Port Adelaide. Brad's uncle is Russell Ebert who won four Magarey Medals and three premierships for Port Adelaide. One of his cousins on his father's side is Brett Ebert who also won a Magarey Medal for Port Adelaide and played for the club in the Australian Football League.

His mother Christine Obst is the daughter of Trevor Obst. Trevor won a Magarey Medal for Port Adelaide and played in four premierships for Port Adelaide. Trevor's father was Ken Obst who played in three premierships for Port Adelaide. Trevor's brother Peter Obst won six premierships for Port Adelaide. Peter's son, Christine's Cousin, is Andrew Obst who played in four premierships for Port Adelaide and played for the Melbourne Football Club in Victoria.

== Statistics ==
Statistics are correct to the end of round 2, 2015

Legend
G	Goals	K	Kicks	D	Disposals	T	Tackles
B	Behinds	H	Handballs	M	Marks

Season	Team	No.	Games	Totals							Averages (per game)						
Season	Team	No.	Games	G	B	K	H	D	M	T	G	B	K	H	D	M	T
2008	West Coast	18	15	5	1	136	97	233	5	1	0.3	0.1	9.1	6.5	15.5	3.7	3.2
2009	West Coast	18	17	6	7	140	142	282	75	69	0.4	0.4	8.2	8.4	16.6	4.4	4.1
2010	West Coast	5	22	8	13	267	154	421	103	90	0.4	0.6	12.1	7.0	19.1	4.7	4.1
2011	West Coast	5	22	14	7	176	123	299	82	73	0.6	0.3	8.0	5.6	13.6	3.7	3.3
2012	Port Adelaide	7	22	17	13	301	203	504	103	128	0.8	0.6	13.7	9.2	22.9	4.7	5.8
2013	Port Adelaide	7	24	13	6	354	201	555	128	119	0.5	0.3	14.8	8.4	23.1	5.3	5.0
2014	Port Adelaide	7	25	13	10	326	229	555	121	149	0.5	0.4	13.0	9.2	22.2	4.8	6.0
2015	Port Adelaide	7	2	1	1	36	25	61	20	11	0.5	0.5	18.0	12.5	30.5	10.0	5.5
Career			149	77	58	1736	1174	2910	688	687	0.5	0.4	11.7	7.9	19.5	4.6	4.6
