= Tilbrook (name) =

Family name

Tilbrook is an English-language surname. Notable people with the name include:

- Adrian Tilbrook, British drummer
- Glenn Tilbrook (born 1957), British singer and guitarist with Squeeze
- H. H. Tilbrook (Henry Hammond Tilbrook, 1848–1937), Welsh-born Australian landscape photographer and newspaper owner
- John Tilbrook (born 1946), Australian rules footballer
- Paula Tilbrook (1930–2019), British actress known for her role as Betty Eagleton in the ITV soap opera Emmerdale
- Richard Tilbrook (born 1962), British civil servant and Clerk of the Privy Council
- Robin Tilbrook (born 1958), British solicitor, leader of the English Democrats
