= Fruchter =

Fruchter is a surname. Notable people with the surname include:

- Norman Fruchter (1937–2023), American writer, filmmaker, and academic
- Temim Fruchter (fl. early 21st century), American writer and former drummer
- Yoshie Fruchter (born 1982), American jazz musician
