= Breslov Bar Band =

American experimental klezmer band

- Also known as: BBB
- Origin: Brooklyn, New York, United States
- Genres: Jewish rock, klezmer, nigun, jazz, experimental rock
- Years active: 2009–present
- Members: Binyomin Ginzberg; Michael Winograd; Jessica Lurie; Allen Watsky; Yoshie Fruchter; Rich Huntley
- Past members: Mike Cohen; Zach Mayer
- Website: www.breslovbarband.com

Breslov Bar Band is an American experimental klezmer band based in Brooklyn, New York. Formed in 2009 by bandleader Binyomin Ginzberg, the band has released three albums, Have No Fear (2010), Happy Hour (2013), and Holy Chutzpah (2022). They are noted for their experimental interpretations of traditional Breslov nigunim.

== History ==
The Breslov Bar Band was founded in 2009 by bandleader Binyomin Ginzberg, a descendant of Rabbi Nachman of Breslov through the Twersky and Halberstam families who grew up with Hasidic nigunim. While attending yeshiva in Scranton, Pennsylvania, he was reprimanded for having a non-functional radio in his room to use as an amplifier for his keyboard, and subsequently began listening to radio music. He later began playing as a for-hire musician at Jewish weddings and bar mitzvahs in New York City; it was in this capacity that he met clarinetist Michael Heitzler, who introduced him to klezmer, leading him to discover the more artistic klezmer and jazz scene and ultimately teach courses on the subject at KlezKamp and Yiddish Summer Weimar.

The band released their debut album, Have No Fear, in 2010, with an August 25 launch party at Brooklyn's Knitting Factory. The album, whose title references Rabbi Nachman's epigram of "Kol Ha'Olam Kulo", received critical acclaim. Initially a quintet on their first album composed of Ginzberg, Mike Cohen on clarinet, Allen Watsky on guitar, Yoshie Fruchter on bass, and Rich Huntley on drums, by the time of their follow-up, 2013's Happy Hour, the group had expanded to six members with the addition of Zach Mayer on baritone saxophone. That year, the band performed at a Hoshana Rabbah concert at The Carlebach Shul in September and as part of the New York Klezmer series at the Stephen Wise Free Synagogue in November, both in Manhattan.

In an April 2019 Facebook post, the band confirmed that they were in the process of finishing up their third album. The album, Holy Chutzpah, was released on January 4, 2022, with Cohen and Mayer replaced by Michael Winograd of Daniel Kahn & the Painted Bird on clarinet and Jessica Lurie on baritone saxophone.

== Musical style ==
Breslov Bar Band's music interprets traditional Breslov nigunim through a modern style incorporating rock, klezmer, punk, jazz, post-bop, funk, reggae, ska, and Middle Eastern influences. Ezra Glinter of The Forward wrote, "While the band moves between styles from song to song (“Mi Yiten" is distinctly reggae flavored, "Adir Ayom" is a more tranquil, Andy Statmenesque meditation), the overall aesthetic is one of intelligent and energetic rock music, only with Jewish musical modalities rather than Blues as its foundation." Their compositions have been attributed to traditional sources including the Maggid of Mezeritch, Rabbi Meir Shapiro, "Turkish sailors", Shabbat zemirot, dance nigunim, Uman melodies, and dabkes from the Meron repertoire, as well as arrangements of melodies from modern Breslov artists such as Adi Ran and Yisrael Dagan.

== Members ==
=== Current ===
- Binyomin Ginzberg – vibrandoneon, keyboards, vocals
- Michael Winograd – clarinet
- Jessica Lurie – baritone saxophone
- Allen Watsky – electric guitar
- Yoshie Fruchter – bass guitar
- Rich Huntley – drums

=== Former ===
- Mike Cohen – clarinet, bass clarinet
- Zach Mayer – baritone saxophone

== Discography ==
- Have No Fear (2010)
- Happy Hour (2013)
- Holy Chutzpah (2022)
