= John Flood (academic) =

British and Australian sociologist

John Anthony Flood
- Occupations: Legal academic, sociologist, consultant, legal advisor, author and researcher

Academic background
- Education: London School of Economics (LLB); University of Warwick (LLM); Yale University (LLM); Northwestern University (PhD)

John Anthony Flood is a British and Australian sociologist of law, legal academic, consultant, author and a researcher. He is professor of law and Society at Griffith University and an adjunct professor of law at Queensland University of Technology. Flood is also a research associate at UCL Centre for Blockchain Technologies.

Flood has published many articles, chapters and reports, and focuses primarily on the legal profession and the globalization of law along with the impact of technological changes on the practice of law. He is the author of Barristers' Clerks—The Law's Middlemen, The Legal Profession in the United States, What Do Lawyers Do? An Ethnography of a Corporate Law Firm and The Global Lawyer.

Flood was an Exxon Fellow in Ethics at Indiana University-Bloomington from 1988 till 1989, Jean Monnet Fellow at European University Institute from 1990 till 1991 and a Leverhulme Research Fellow from 2012 till 2014.

Flood has blogged since 2005 at John Flood's Random Academic Thoughts (RATs) on law, legal profession, and globalization.

== Education ==
Flood completed his LL.B. in Law and Economics from London School of Economics in 1975. He did his LL.M. by research in Socio-Legal Studies from University of Warwick in 1978. He moved to USA for further studies and received his second LL.M. degree from Yale Law School in 1980. In 1987, Flood completed his Ph.D. in sociology from Northwestern University.

== Career ==
After completing his LL.M. from Yale Law School, Flood joined American Bar Foundation as affiliated scholar and later got promoted as research associate in 1983. From 1987 till 1992, he taught law and criminal justice at Indiana University-Bloomington as an assistant professor. Between Indiana and Westminster Flood held a Jean Monnet Fellowship at the European University Institute in Florence, Italy. In 1992, Flood moved back to England and joined University of Westminster as a reader in Law and then taught as a professor of law and sociology till 2014. Between 2012 and 2014 Flood held a Leverhulme Research Fellowship.

Flood then moved to Ireland and was the inaugural McCann FitzGerald Professor of International Law and Business at University College Dublin Sutherland School of Law till 2015. He moved to Australia and accepted a position of professor of law and society at Griffith University iat the end of 2015.

Flood was a founding editor of Legal Profession Section in Jotwell from 2009 to 2016. He served as the inaugural director of Law Futures Centre at the Griffith University in 2015 to 2016. Flood is member of the editorial boards of Law Technology and Humans, and the International Journal of the Legal Profession. Since 2023 Flood has been appointed General Editor of the journal Legal Ethics.

In 2024 Flood was appointed to the governing board of a new higher education institution, the London School of Innovation.

== Research ==
Flood's primary research focuses on law, sociology of law, the impact of technology on law and the legal profession, the legal profession and law firms, and the globalization of law. In 1970's, he conducted a participant-observational research on barrister's clerks. He explored the role of a barrister's clerk in present times as the historical records about their roles is scarce. He discussed the duties and responsibilities of the clerks and he pointed out the role of a clerk in the advancement of a barrister's career. He discussed three major roles of clerks and gathered ethnographic information about the clerks which added to the future studies about the power distribution between the barrister and their clerks. While explaining the role of clerks, Flood considered the clerks as the defining line between the law and world of clients and money. The class division between the barristers and the clerks emphasizes Flood's theory about the clerks.

Early in his career, Flood also studied the ethnography of law firms, focusing on the organization of law firms and the relationships between lawyers and clients. Flood's work showed how much of corporate lawyers' work actually revolved around relationships in law and most lawyers as they became more senior did less and less law.

Flood researched the impact of globalization on the business industry and also studied the role and position of legal elites in the global context. He conducted research about lawyer's role as a sanctifier and the role of elite law firms in the global business transactions. Flood studied the theoretical foundations of the legal practices undertaken by international businesses. He highlighted the political and economic factors affecting the law firms, the strategies used by international firms to capitalize their growth and briefly discussed the UK Pfandbriefe as a legal investment device in his article. Flood conducted research on the capital markets as a driver of global economy and as a means of interaction between the investment banks and the elite law firms. He also explained the transnational legal processes and compared the investment laws in Turkmenistan and Poland. He also discussed the active players in the capital markets and the three top tier investment banks dominating the global capital market. Flood also included the major legal advisors of the major investment banks in his research.

Along with studying the role of elite law firms in the capital markets, Flood also studied the development of these global law firms and the multidisciplinary practices (MDPs) of these firms. He conducted research on how different cultural, social and economic factors have transformed the global legal practice and explained the basic structure of a British law firm. He conducted interviews to study lawyer's work in the international context. In the early 2000s, Flood took on research about the cross-border lawmaking in large law firms. In his paper about contemporary legal practices in the borderless and globalized setting, he researched for methods of equipping lawyers to adapt with this globalized setting where there is increased competition as non-lawyers are also providing legal services. Flood then expanded his research focus to include the effect of blockchain or distributed ledger technology on law and the legal profession. In late 2010s, he wrote an article about the anarcho-capitalism, blockchain and the initial coin offerings (ICO). He stated that blockchain technology provides a chain of authority that is difficult to hack or change and traced the different hurdles in the history of blockchain technology. Flood argued that the philosophical origin of this technology dated back to the Austrian school's anarchic-capitalist strain that believed in the individual to individual interaction as the society's foundation. Flood also included the impact of artificial intelligence while examining the impact of blockchain technologies on professions and their related knowledge bases. He discussed the profession that were the eager and the reluctant adopters of technology and the proceeded to explain the nature of expertise and the function in the legal profession. He stated that pure automation is difficult to achieve in professions as these include both the technical and indeterminate elements. Flood also discussed the application of AI and blockchain technology such as DAO and its impact on the role of lawyer as a trusted legal advisor. He edited the open access De Gruyter Handbook of Blockchain and Society, with Dr Lachlan Robb of QUT.

Flood conducted research on the impact of technology on legal education, specifically focusing on the three narratives of technology and archetypes as the drivers of change. He explained how the technological narratives effect how the lawyers react to lawtech. Flood suggested the 'adaptive professionalism' narrative that contributes to a better approach for the adaption of the new curriculum in legal education.

== Awards and honors ==
- 1988-1989 - Exxon Fellow in Ethics, Indiana University-Bloomington
- 1990-1991 - Jean Monnet Fellow, European University Institute
- 1993 - Wedderburn Prize, Modern Law Review Editorial Committee for article: "Lawyers and Arbitration"
- 2012-2014 - Leverhulme Research Fellowship

== Bibliography ==
=== Books ===
- Barristers' Clerks—The Law's Middlemen (1983)
- The Legal Profession in the United States (1985)
- What Do Lawyers Do? An Ethnography of a Corporate Law Firm (2013)
- The Global Lawyer (2020)
- De Gruyter Handbook of Blockchain and Society (2026)

=== Selected articles and chapters ===
- Megalawyering in the Global Order: The Cultural, Social and Economic Transformation of Global Legal Practice, 3(1–2) International Journal of the Legal Profession, 169-214, 1996
- Doing Business: The Management of Uncertainty in Lawyers' Work, 25(1) Law & Society Review, 41–71, 1991
- Socio-Legal Ethnography, in Theory and Method in Socio-Legal Research, 33-48 (eds) R Banakar & M Travers, Hart Publishing, 2005
- Professions and Expertise: How Machine Learning and Blockchain are Redesigning the Landscape of Professional Knowledge and Organisation (with Lachlan Robb) 73(2) University of Miami Law Review's 2018 Symposium, Hack to the Future: How Technology is Disrupting the Legal Profession, 312–351, 2019
- The Profession(s)' Engagements with LawTech: The Role that Meta-Narratives Play (with Francesca Bartlett, Kate Galloway, Kieran Tranter, Julian Webb, Lisa Webley) 1(1) Law Technology and Humans, 6-26, 2019
- Professions and Professional Service Firms in a Global Context: Reframing Narratives, in Professions and Professional Service Firms: Private and Public Sector Enterprises in the Global Economy, 26-45 (eds) M Saks & D Muzio, Routledge, 2018
- Legal Professionals of the Future: Their Ethos, Role and Skills, in New Suits: Appetite for Disruption in the Legal World, 115-129 (eds) M DeStefano and G Dobrauz-Saldapenna, Stampfli Verlag, 2019
