= Deveykus =

American doom metal band

- Origin: Philadelphia, Pennsylvania
- Genres: Jewish rock, doom metal, drone metal, nigun, klezmer
- Years active: 2012–present
- Labels: Tzadik
- Members: Dan Blacksberg; Nick Millevoi; Yoshie Fruchter; Johnny DeBlase; Eli Litwin

Deveykus is an American doom metal band from Philadelphia. They were formed in 2012 by trombonist Dan Blacksberg and guitarist Nick Millevoi, later adding guitarist Yoshie Fruchter, bassist Johnny DeBlase, and drummer Eli Litwin. Their debut album, Pillar Without Mercy, was released through Tzadik Records on June 18, 2013, as part of the label's "Radical Jewish Culture" Series.

Deveykus' music combines nigunnim, traditional wordless Hasidic melodies, with a drone/doom metal and free jazz style influenced by bands like Earth and Sunn O))). Their name is a Yiddish spelling of devekut, a genre of slow, meditative niggunim.

== Biography ==
Deveykus was formed in 2012 by trombonist Dan Blacksberg and guitarist Nick Millevoi, who had known each other since middle school and played together in several bands, including the hardcore punk act Electric Simcha. Blacksberg, a classically trained musician with little knowledge of rock music, was introduced to doom metal by Millevoi and others in the band.

Deveykus' debut album, Pillar Without Mercy, was released on June 18, 2013, as part of Tzadik Records' Radical Jewish Culture series. The track "Wordless Ecstasy" was premiered in April by Alarm magazine. The album was #12 on Spin Magazine's "20 Best Avant Albums of 2013" and included in The Forward's "Best Experimental Jewish Music of 2013", and Deveykus received radio play on WKDU and WFMU.

== Members ==
- Dan Blacksberg – trombone
- Nick Millevoi – guitar
- Yoshie Fruchter – guitar
- Johnny DeBlase – bass guitar
- Eli Litwin – drums

== Discography ==
Albums

- Pillar Without Mercy (2013; Tzadik)

Singles

- "Wordless Ecstasy" (2013; Pillar Without Mercy; Tzadik)
