= The Northern Argus =

Australian newspaper

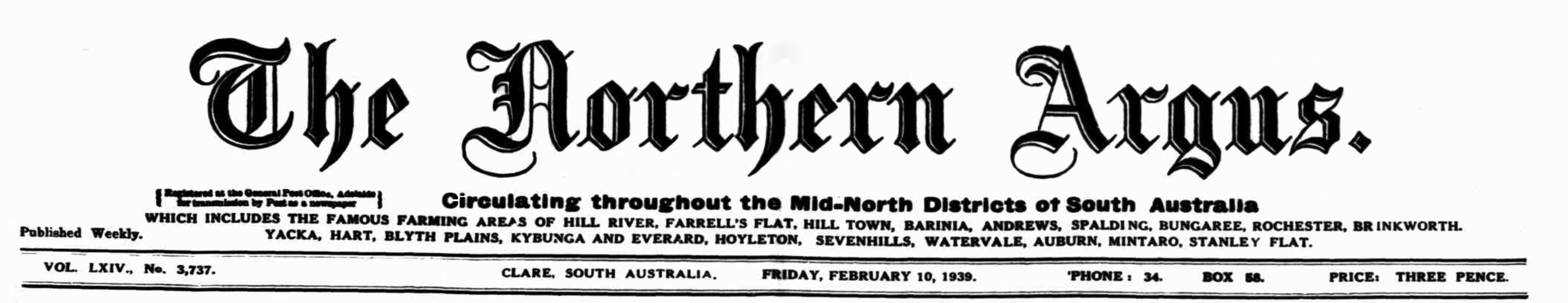

The Northern Argus, first published on 19 February 1869, is a newspaper printed in Clare, South Australia. It was later sold to Rural Press, previously owned by Fairfax Media, but now an Australian media company trading as Australian Community Media.

== History ==
The Northern Argus newspaper (as distinct from the Southern Argus published in Strathalbyn) was founded by Alfred Clode and his brother-in-law Henry Hammond Tilbrook (c. 1848– 9 September 1937). The first issue was greeted with polite silence by other newspapers, most saying nothing more than it was "the same size as the Wallaroo Times". The Kapunda Herald observed that it had been produced under difficulties, and would refrain from criticism.

In 1870 Henry's brother Alfred Tilbrook (c. 1847 – 10 July 1913) was taken on and Clode left the partnership to found an English-language newspaper in Japan. Robert Kelly succeeded Clode as editor, to be followed by Robert's father William Kelly (6 February 1827 – 30 January 1913) when Robert left to become a minister of religion. William Kelly served as editor for 13 years (and was a longtime mayor of Clare), followed by Alfred Tilbrook. Henry retired in 1889; the partners then becoming his son Reginald Henry Tilbrook (16 December 1870 – 4 November 1944) and Alfred Tilbrook. Ownership and management of the business passed to Reginald's three sons: Eric Hammond Hanley Tilbrook (1895–1966), Maurice Henry Tilbrook (1897–1963), and Godfrey Vincent Tilbrook (1901–1975).

The Blyth Agriculturist (6 November 1908 - 25 June 1969) was begun as an offshoot of the Northern Argus newspaper and ran until 1969, covering news for Blyth and nearby regions.

== Distribution ==
Like other Rural Press publications, the newspaper is also available online.

== Digitisation ==
Issues from Vol.1 No.1 of 19 February 1869 to Vol.LXXXV No.5832 of 22 December 1954 have been OCR digitised from photographic copies by the National Library of Australia and may be retrieved using Trove.
