= Dovid Halberstam =

Polish Hasidic Jewish religious leader

- Title: Kr'Shanover Rav

Personal life
- Born: Dovid Halberstam; Sacz, 1821
- Died: 1894 Chrzanow
- Buried: Chrzanow; 1894
- Spouse: Achsa Halberstam (b. N), Leah Zissah Halberstam (b. Zinz)
- Children: Sarah Gitel Teomim, Aryey Leib Halberstam, N Shapiro, N Weissblum, Miriam Horowitz, Josef Zeev Halberstam, Moses Halberstam, Hinde Teitelbaum, Naftoli Halberstam
- Parents: Chaim Halberstam (father); Rachel Feige Halberstam Sanz (b. Frenkel-Teomin) (mother)
- Dynasty: Sanz

Religious life
- Religion: Judaism

Jewish leader
- Predecessor: Shloymele Bochner
- Successor: Naftoli Halberstam
- Began: c. 1860?
- Ended: 1894
- Dynasty: Sanz

Dovid Halberstam (1821–1894) was a religious leader of the Hasidic Jewish community of Chrzanow.

== Family life ==
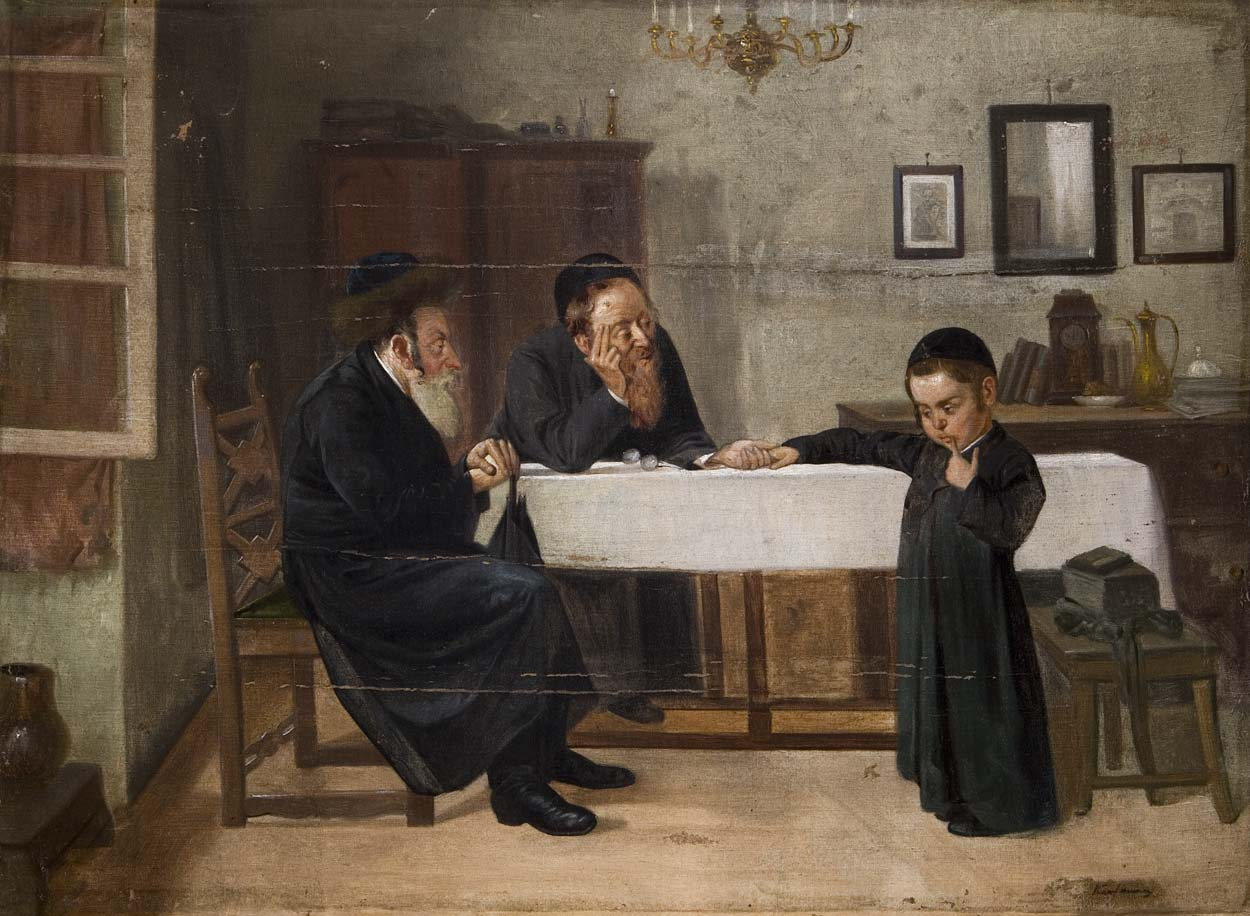
Interior with Rebbe, Father and Son, author unknown, 19th century

Dovid Halberstam was the second son of Chaim Halberstam or Divrei Chaim, the founder of the Sanz Hasidic dynasty of rebbes, which enjoyed enormous influence over the Hasidic Jewry in Western Galicia during the late 19th and early 20th centuries.

Raised in a family of enormous prestige, from childhood and early youth he was exposed to Talmudist, poskim and Kabbalistic disputes of his time, and was trained to be a religious leader. Like his older brother Yechezkel Halberstam he did not succeed his father in Sanz; the rabbinical position went to his younger brother Aharon Halberstam instead.

Married twice, Halberstam had at least three sons, Moses, Joshua and Naftoli, and a number of grandsons. Many of them became distinct figures within the Chrzanow Hasidic population.

He is buried at the Chrzanow Jewish cemetery, his family ohel is well maintained.

== Leadership ==
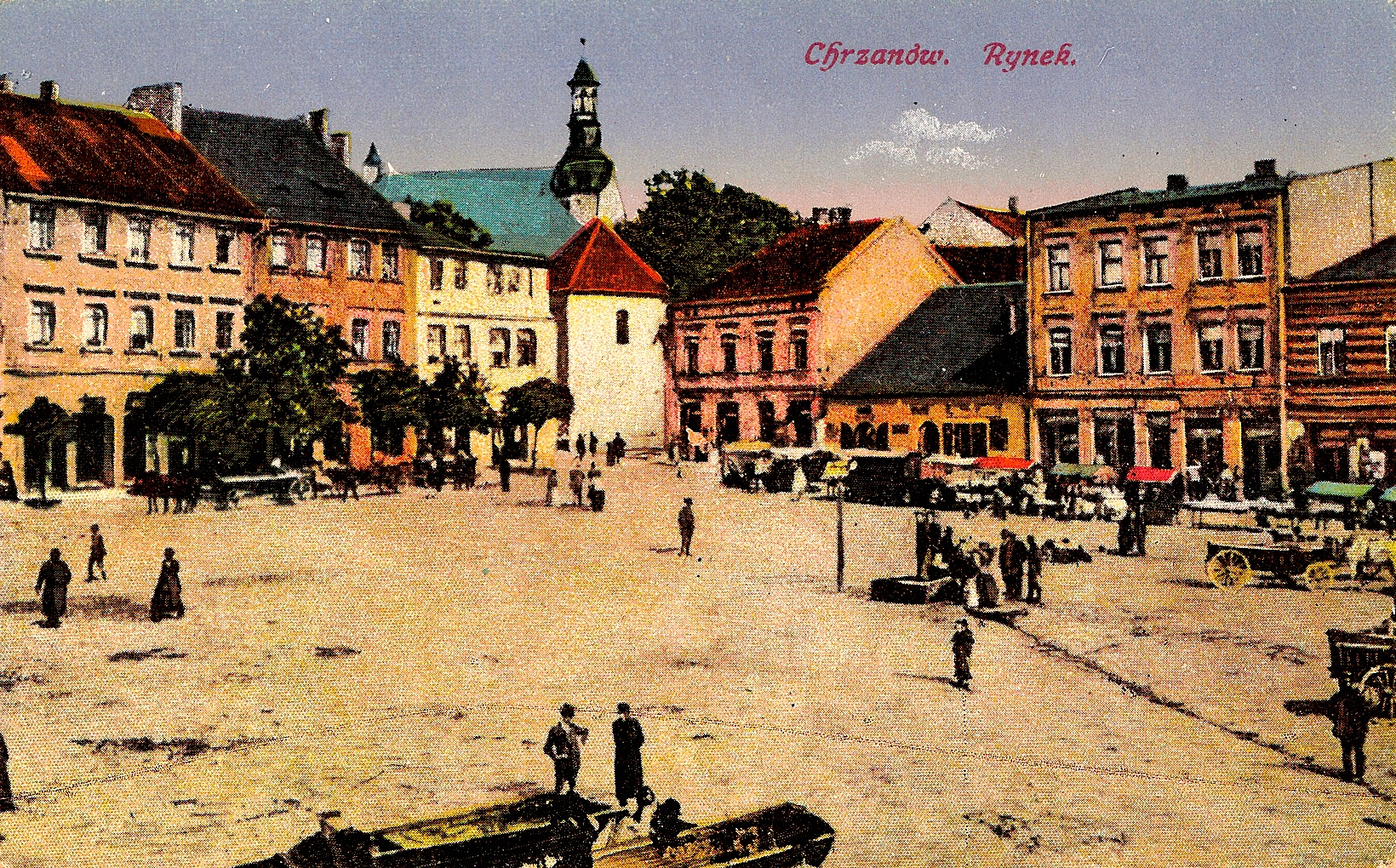
old Chrzanow

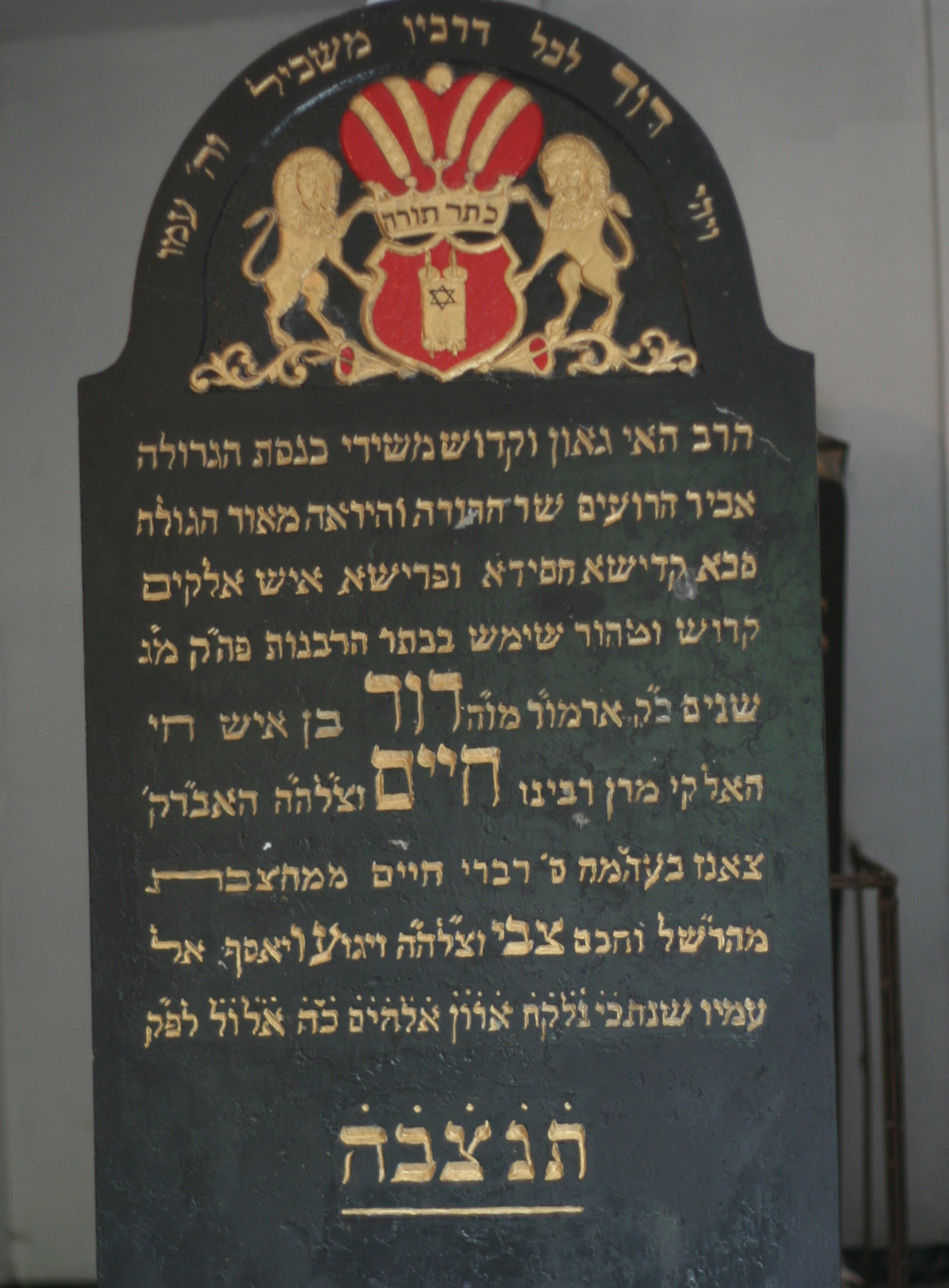
Dovid Halberstam's matzeva

It is not clear if Halberstam had served as rebbe before moving to Chrzanow; also the exact date of him assuming the post is unknown (probably around 1860).

During his tenure, he became engaged in the growing rivalry between the Sanz and the Radomsker schools. Though the Radomsk leader, Tiferes Schlomo, was a disciple of his father and the two maintained fairly respectful relations, Dovid Halberstam aggravated them by his personal intransigence.

Highly respected as a religious leader, Halberstam was appreciated for his scholarly competence and pious zeal. However, he turned out to be a divisive figure within the local Jewish community. This was due to rigorous application of his teaching, his firm grip on leadership and the uncompromising style. As a result, a number of civil libel charges were brought against him. Also, despite some attempts, his authority has never stretched beyond the Chrzanow area.

Over time the influence of Halberstam grew so significant that he became the founder of the dynasty of Chrzanow rebbes, which guided the Jewish population of the town for almost a century. His son Naftoli and then his grandson Mendel succeeded him at the post and led the local religious community until its destruction in 1942–1943.

== See also ==
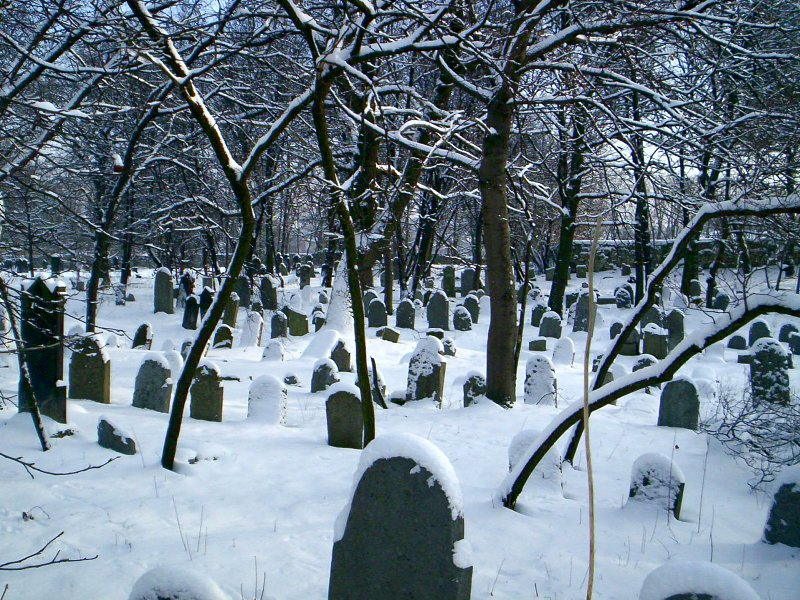
Chrzanow Jewish cemetery

- Sanz dynasty
- Chaim Halberstam
- Chrzanow
