= Jack Murphy (footballer) =

Australian rules footballer

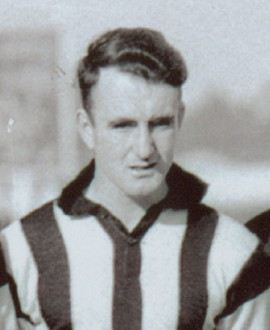
- Murphy in 1939

Personal information
- Full name: John Patrick Murphy
- Born: 1 February 1918
- Died: 2 October 2002 (aged 84)
- Original team: Caulfield
- Height: 183 cm (6 ft 0 in)
- Weight: 79 kg (174 lb)

Playing career^{1}
Years	Club	Games (Goals)
1937–1947	Collingwood	160 (44)
- ^{1} Playing statistics correct to the end of 1947.

John Patrick Murphy (1 February 1918 – 2 October 2002) was an Australian rules footballer who played with Collingwood in the Victorian Football League (VFL). Murphy played 160 games for the Magpies, usually in defence, and won the 1941 Copeland Trophy for Collingwood's best and fairest player. His son John played for Sturt in the SANFL and South Melbourne. He died in October 2002 at the age of 84.
