= Craig Ebert =

Australian rules footballer

Personal information
- Full name: Craig Gregory Ebert
- Original team: Loxton (RFL)

Playing career
Years	Club	Games (Goals)
1981-1988	Port Adelaide	112 (16)
1989-1991	West Adelaide	56
Total		168

Craig Ebert was an Australian rules footballer for Port Adelaide and West Adelaide in the South Australian National Football League.

== Port Adelaide ==
Craig Ebert made his debut for Port Adelaide in 1981. He would appear in the 1984 SANFL Grand Final for the club. Port Adelaide would lose the match by 9 points. At the end of 1988 Craig would leave the club in search for more opportunities.

== West Adelaide ==
Craig Ebert joined West Adelaide for the 1989 SANFL season. He would play at the club for three years before retiring.

== Personal life ==
He is the father of Brad Ebert, the brother of Russell Ebert and Jeff Ebert and the uncle of Brett Ebert.
