= Andrew Obst =

Australian rules footballer

Personal information
- Full name: Andrew Obst
- Born: 19 August 1964 (age 62)
- Original team: Port Adelaide (SANFL)
- Draft: No. 37, 1987 national draft
- Height: 184 cm (6 ft 0 in)
- Weight: 82 kg (181 lb)
- Position: Midfielder

Playing career^{1}
Years	Club	Games (Goals)
1987–1989, 1998–1999	Port Adelaide (SANFL)	90 (50)
1990–1997	Melbourne (AFL)	149 (60)
Total		239 (110)
- ^{1} Playing statistics correct to the end of 1997.

Andrew Obst (born 19 August 1964) is a former Australian rules footballer who played for Melbourne in the Australian Football League (AFL) and Port Adelaide in the South Australian National Football League (SANFL).

== Port Adelaide (1987–1989, 1998–1999) ==
Obst started his career in the South Australian Amateur Football League, representing the Australian Amateurs team at the 1988 Adelaide Bicentennial Carnival before playing for Port Adelaide. He was drafted to Melbourne with pick 37 in the 1987 VFL Draft but did not move until a few years later.

Andrew was a member of 4 Port Adelaide premiership teams. 2 prior to going to the AFL 1988 and 1989, and 2 after 1998 & 1999.

== Melbourne (1990–1997) ==
Andrew eventually joined Melbourne for the 1990 AFL season. An on-baller, Obst was also used as a centreman and tagger. He took part in seven finals matches while at Melbourne.

== Personal life ==
Obst came from a known Port Adelaide family; his grandfather Ken, father Peter and uncle Trevor all played with distinction for Port Adelaide. Andrew's uncle Trevor Obst is Brad Ebert's grandfather.
