= Chaim Halberstam =

Polish rabbi (1793–1876)

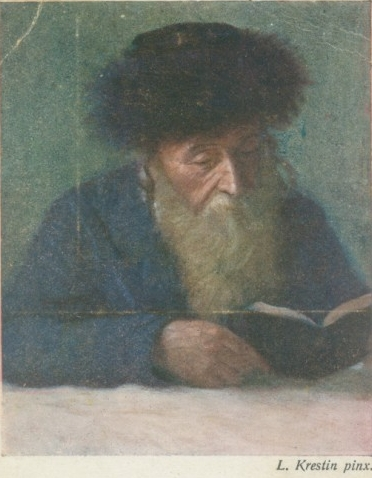
- Title: Tsanzer Rov

Personal life
- Born: Chaim Halberstam; 1793 Tarnogród, Austrian Empire
- Died: 19 April 1876 (aged 82–83) Nowy Sącz, Kingdom of Galicia and Lodomeria, Austria-Hungary
- Buried: Nowy Sącz
- Spouse: Rochel Feyga Frenkl-Thumim; Rechl Unger
- Children: Yechezkel Shraga Halberstam; Dovid Halberstam; Myer Noson Halberstam; Aharon Halberstam; Boruch Halberstam; Shulem Eliezer Halberstam; Yeshayo Halbertsam; Reytse Twerski; Miryom Unger; Nechume Rubin; Yita Baron; Fradil Rozenfeld; Gutshe Moskovitsh; Tilla Horowitz
- Parent: Arye Leyb Halberstam, av beis din, Tarnogrod (father)
- Dynasty: Sanz

Religious life
- Religion: Judaism

Jewish leader
- Predecessor: none
- Successor: Aharon Halberstam of Sanz
- Began: 1830
- Ended: 19 April 1876
- Main work: Divrei Chaim
- Dynasty: Sanz

Chaim Halberstam of Sanz (Hebrew: חיים הלברשטאם מצאנז; 1793–1876), known as the Divrei Chaim after the title of his writings, was the rabbi of Sanz (Polish: Nowy Sącz), and the founding rebbe of the Sanz dynasty of Hasidic Judaism.

== Life ==
Halberstam was a pupil of Rabbi Sholom Rokeach of Belz, Rabbi Moshe Yehoshua Heshl Orenstein and Rabbi Naftali Tzvi of Ropshitz. His first rabbinical position was in Rudnik. In 1830 he was appointed as the town rabbi of Sanz, where he founded a Hasidic dynasty. He attracted many followers and students, due to his piety and greatness. Sanz has been succeeded nowadays by the Sanz-Klausenberg, Sanz-Zmigrad, Tshakover (Chokover) Hasidic dynasties, and the Bobov Hasidic dynasties, among others.

== Family life ==
Halberstam was born in 1793, in Tarnogród, today Poland. His first wife Rochel Feyga was the daughter of Rabbi Boruch Frenkl-Thumim (1760–1828), the rabbi of Lipník nad Bečvou (לייפניק Leipnik) and author of the work Boruch Taam. They had five sons and three daughters. When she died he then married her sister, who died childless. His third wife was Rechil Devorah Unger, daughter of Rabbi Yechil Tzvi Unger, son of Rabbi Mordechai Dovid Unger of Dombrov; they had three sons and four daughters.

Halberstam had eight sons and seven daughters. His eight sons were:

- Rabbi Yechezkel Shraga Halberstam (1814–1898) of Shinove
- Rabbi Dovid Halberstam (1821–1894) of Chrzanów
- Rabbi Myer Noson Halberstam (1827–1855), father of Rabbi Shlomo Halberstam, the first Bobover Rebbe
- Rabbi Aharon Halberstam (1828-1903) his successor in Nowy Sącz
- Rabbi Boruch Halberstam (1829–1906) of Gorlice (Yiddish: גארליץ, romanized: Gorlitz)
- Rabbi Shulem Lazer Halberstam of Ratzfert (1861–1944), who was murdered by the Nazis in the Holocaust
- Rabbi Yeshaye Halberstam of Czchów (Yiddish: טשחויוו Tshkhoiv) (1864–1944), who was also murdered by the Nazis.
- Aryeh Leibish Halberstam died aged 7

Halberstam's sons all became famous rebbes (except for Myer Noson, who predeceased him). His seven daughters all married Hasidic leaders.

Halberstam died in Sanz, Austria-Hungary (now Poland) in 1876 (25 Nisan 5636).

== Leadership ==
Halberstam was acclaimed by the leading rabbis of his generation as one of the foremost Talmudists, poskim and Kabbalistic authorities of his time, he received queries from Rabbis and communities from all over the world. His responsa, as well as his Torah commentaries, published under the title Divrei Chaim, reflect his Torah greatness, his humility, and his compassionate nature. He was a champion of the poor and established many organizations to relieve them of their poverty. He was the first Honorary President of Kolel Chibas Yerushalayim.

During his 46 years as Rabbi of Sanz; that city was transformed into a vibrant center of Hasidism, attracting tens of thousands of followers. Among his many disciples, are counted such leaders as Rabbi Zvi Hirsh Friedlander of Liska, the Tiferes Shlome of Radomsk, Rabbi Abraham Judah ha-Kohen Schwartz, Rabbi Meir Horowitz of Dzhikov, and the Kedishes Yom Tov of Sighet. He studied with his brother-in-law, Yosef Babad, author of the Minchat Chinuch.

== Works ==
- Many of his teachings are recorded in sefarim called Divrei Chaim ["words of life"]. These include:
  - A commentary on the Torah and Jewish holidays
  - Responsa (She'elot u-Teshuvot)
    - Especially on Yoreh De'ah, Mikveh, Niddah
  - A commentary on the Passover Haggadah
- A collection of his particular customs and practices was published under the name Darkei Chaim ["ways of life"].
- ArtScroll has published a biography of him entitled The Sanzer Rav and His Dynasty (Avraham Yitsḥaḳ Bromberg, 1986)
