= Lisa Webley =

British legal scholar

- Occupations: Legal scholar, academic and author

Academic background
- Education: Bachelor of Laws in Law with French; Master of Arts in Legal Practice; Master of Arts in Higher Education; Postgraduate Diploma in Legal Practice; Diploma in French Legal Studies; Doctor of Philosophy in Law
- Alma mater: University of Birmingham; Université de Limoges; University of Westminster; University of Oxford; University of London

Lisa Webley is a legal scholar, academic, and author who is serving as the Chair of Legal Education and Research at the University of Birmingham and Associate Senior Research Fellow at the Institute of Advanced Legal Studies (IALS) in University of London. She is a visiting professor at the University of Portsmouth (UoP), Leeds Beckett University (LBU), and Victoria University Australia (VU).

Webley's research focuses on various aspects of the legal profession, including regulation, education, ethics, and professionalism, as well as broader concerns such as access to justice and the rule of law. She has led research projects and conducted funded empirical research for public bodies and organizations, including the European Commission, the Ministry of Justice, and the Department for Trade and Industry. Her publications include Adversarialism and Consensus? The Professions' Construction of Solicitor and Family Mediator Identity and Role, Complete Public Law: Text, Cases and Materials, and Legal Writing with various peer-reviewed journal articles and book chapters. She has supervised students who are engaged in empirical socio-legal research, and her contributions earned her the Law Teacher of the Year award from Oxford University Press.

Webley is a member of the Research Committee on Sociology of Law and has served as the General Editor of Legal Ethics.

== Education ==
Webley started her legal education in 1990 studying the LL.B. (Law with French) at the University of Birmingham, obtaining a Diploma in French Legal Studies from the University of Limoges in France in 1993 during a year abroad, and graduating with the LLB (Hons) (Law with French) in 1994. This was followed by her completing the Postgraduate Diploma in Legal Practice, the qualification for solicitors, at the College of Law, Chester. In 2004, she completed an M.A. in Legal Practice from the University of Westminster before her undertaking doctoral studies, earning her Ph.D. in law from the Institute of Advanced Legal Studies at the University of London in 2008. Alongside her legal qualifications, she earned a Certificate in Sociology with Distinction from Birkbeck College in 2014. Continuing her academic journey, she obtained an M.A. with Merit in Higher Education from the University of Westminster and is pursuing an M.St. in Practical Ethics at the University of Oxford.

== Career ==
Webley served as a Research Assistant (1995–1998) and Research Fellow (1998–2000) at IALS, University of London while also holding Visiting Lecturer positions at Birkbeck College and the University of Exeter. Moving to the University of Westminster in 2000, she served as a Senior Lecturer and Principal Lecturer before advancing to the role of Head and Director of Learning and Teaching/Education. In 2011, she assumed the position of Professor of Empirical Legal Studies, was the acting Head of School at various points and the Director of the Centre of the Legal Profession (2014–2017). Since 2018, she has served as the Chair of Legal Education and Research, concurrently serving as a visiting professor at UoP, LBU, and VU as well as Associate Senior Fellow at IALS.

Webley served as Research Director of the Centre on Professional and Legal Education and Research (CEPLER) from 2018 to 2020.

She served as Secretary of the International Association of Legal Ethics (2012–2017), General Editor of the Legal Ethics Journal (2017–2023), and co-director of Legal Education Research Network from December 2017 to 2019. She has also served as an external examiner at numerous higher education institutions and has chaired the International Working Group of the Legal Professions at International Sociological Association from 2018 to 2023.

== Research ==
Webley has directed her research towards legal education, legal ethics, the legal profession, dispute resolution, lawtech, and access to justice, including family justice. She explored approaches to divorce and custody disputes advocated by the Law Society of England and Wales and the UK College of Family Mediators in Adversarialism and Consensus?: The Professions' Construction of Solicitor and Family Mediator Identity and Role, which was part of the Dissertation Series from Quid Pro Books. Her Legal Writing series covered assessment methods and critical aspects like legal research and referencing to prevent plagiarism. The second edition of this series was praised in the Legal Education Digest for its effective communication of ideas and emphasis on students writing style. She co-authored five editions of Complete Public Law, alongside Harriet Samuels providing an understanding of public law through commentary, relevant case extracts, and learning features.

Webley has focused on Equality, Diversity, and Inclusion (EDI) within the legal profession. Through the University of Birmingham, she conducted contract-based applied research and consultancy for law firms, legal professional bodies, regulators, and government departments. She is involved in the research work of the InterLaw Diversity Forum. Her work addressed legal professionalism, EDI/DEI in the legal profession, legal ethics, new technologies in practice and the legal system, and access to justice.

Webley led initiatives and projects, securing project grants aligned with Equal Employment Opportunity (EEI) activities as well, and her efforts with the law firms and legal departments, including Government Legal Services, have centered on promoting best practices for fostering a diverse legal workforce. She conducted a qualitative study funded by the Legal Services Board, exploring diversity in the legal profession, focusing on barriers and choices affecting lawyers from diverse backgrounds, especially women and those from Black, Asian, and Minority Ethnic (BAME) groups. In collaborative work, she analyzed career strategies of white women and black and minority ethnic legal professionals in England and Wales, using sociological theories to understand how individuals navigate their legal careers and also investigated factors hindering women's progression in the solicitors' profession, drawing insights from a Law Society study.

In 2023, Webley participated in an English-Ukrainian rule of law dictionary project and delved into the ethics of the lawyer-client-societal relationship, employing a veil of ignorance lens to consider various ethical, rule of law, and access to justice parameters. In addition, she has been exploring the ethical and regulatory implications of AI in the legal sector, along with its access to justice benefits.

== Awards and honors ==
- 2016 – Law Teacher of the Year, Oxford University Press

== Bibliography ==
=== Selected books ===
- Adversarialism and Consensus? The Professions' Construction of Solicitor and Family Mediator Identity and Role (2010) ISBN 978-1610270168
- Complete Public Law: Text, Cases, and Materials 5th Edition (2021) ISBN 978-0198853183
- Legal Writing 5th Edition (2024) ISBN 978-1138586154

=== Selected articles ===
- Webley, L., & Duff, L. (2007). Women solicitors as a barometer for problems within the legal profession–time to put values before profits?. Journal of Law and Society, 34(3), 374–402.
- Sommerlad, H., Webley, L., Duff, L., Muzio, D., Tomlinson, J., & Parnham, R. (2010). Diversity in the legal profession in England and Wales: a qualitative study of barriers and individual choices. University of Westminster Law Press (pp. 1–83).
- Webley, L. (2010). Qualitative approaches to empirical legal research. in: Cane, P. and Kritzer, H. (ed.) Oxford handbook of empirical legal research Oxford Oxford University Press. (pp. 926–950).
- Tomlinson, J., Muzio, D., Sommerlad, H., Webley, L., & Duff, L. (2013). Structure, agency and career strategies of white women and black and minority ethnic individuals in the legal profession. Human relations, 66(2), 245–269.
- Webley, L. (2014). Legal professional de (re) regulation, equality, and inclusion, and the contested space of professionalism within the legal market in England and Wales. Fordham L. Rev., 83, 2349.
