= Bob Elix =

Australian football official

Bob Elix AM ASM is a former Australian rules footballer with Port Adelaide in the South Australian National Football League (SANFL), a long time official with the Northern Territory Football League (NTFL) and former longserving member of the Darwin City Council.

== Career ==
Elix played on the half-back flank for Port Adelaide when they won the 1965 SANFL Grand Final against Sturt Football Club.

His career as a SANFL player ended when he broke his leg during the Anzac Day match.

In June 1969 Elix moved to Darwin, where he was appointed captain/coach of NTFL club Darwin for the 1970/71 season.

A knee injury forced his playing retirement, and Elix switched to coaching fellow NTFL club Waratah, taking them to premiers in 1976/77, with Queen Elizabeth II a spectator at the grand final.

Elix coached his third NTFL club, Nightcliff, from 1977 to 1981, also serving as club president in 1978/79. He was an umpire in the 1979/80 and 1980/81 seasons.

In 1979 he coached the Northern Territory, which competed in Division Two of the National Football Championship Carnival. He returned to coach Nightcliff in 1980/81 and served as club president.

From 1990 to 1994 or 1996 he coached the Northern Territory University "Rats" Football Club, which competed in the Northern Territory Football Association (NTFA), after which he was elected president of the club.

Elix was elected to the NTFL Board in 1998 and chairman of the Australian Football League (AFLNT) from 2000 to 2013. He was chairman and heavily involved in the formation of the Northern Territory Football Club (NTFC), in 2008, which competed in the Queensland Australian Football League (QAFL).

During this time the NTFL grew in influence and financial position, to where it employed 34 full-time employees based around the Northern Territory. Much of this turnaround can be attributed to enlisting the aid of AFL CEO Wayne Jackson, largely credited to Elix.

== Recognition ==
Elix was made a Member of the Order of Australia (AM) in the 2014 Queen's Birthday Honours and received an Australian Sports Medal in 2000.

He was awarded the 2009 Jack Titus Service Award, recognising his four decades of contribution to Australian rules football in the Northern Territory, was granted AFLNT Life Membership in 2010, and was a 2014 inductee to the AFL Hall of Fame.

== Other interests ==
Elix served the Darwin City Council (DCC) as councillor for 31 years, a record term, retiring in December 2015. He was deputy mayor in 2016.

Elix was a contributor to Gods of Thunder, a history of the AFL in the Territory, by Jessica Webster, a former NT News journalist.
