= H. H. Tilbrook =

Australian photographer (1848–1937)

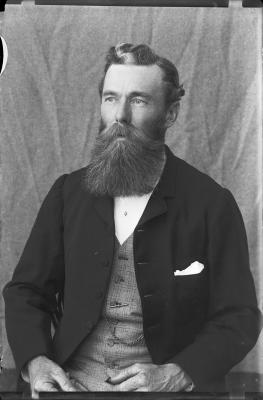
- Portrait of Tilbrook c1890
- Born: Henry Hammond Tilbrook; 1848; Llandudno, Wales
- Died: 1937 (aged 88–89); St Peters, South Australia
- Notable work: Corset Rock Spoils of the ocean
- Style: Landscape
- Spouse: Marianne Tilbrook (1848–1906)

Henry Hammond Tilbrook (1848–1937) was a Welsh-born South Australian landscape photographer, inventor and traveller, who at age 21, co-founded the Northern Argus newspaper in the Clare region of South Australia.

== Biography ==
Tilbrook was born in Llandudno, Wales, on June 14, 1848. His father was a gamekeeper originally from Weston Colville, Cambridgeshire. When Tilbrook was six years old, the family sailed to South Australia on the Albermarle. He worked for a short time as a typesetter at the Register in Adelaide, as well as working as a lamb minder for a short time. Enticed by the gold rush at the time, Tilbrook moved to New Zealand to try to make a living prospecting. After having no luck with gold, he moved on to work for the Grey River Argus in Greymouth.

We come forward with no flourish of trumpets, we put forth no high-sounding policy; our aim will be to 'be just and fear not' and our convictions we shall maintain with independence of spirit and outspoken candour.

— H. H. Tilbrook, Northern Argus, first edition, 1869

Shortly after returning from New Zealand, Tilbrook founded the Northern Argus newspaper in Clare. On 19 February 1869, when he was 21, the first edition was published. On 1 January 1870 he married Marianne Clode in Christ Church, North Adelaide. Marianne Clode was the daughter of Richard and Charlotte Clode from Windsor in England.

Tilbrook died on 9 September 1937 in St Peters.

== Photography ==
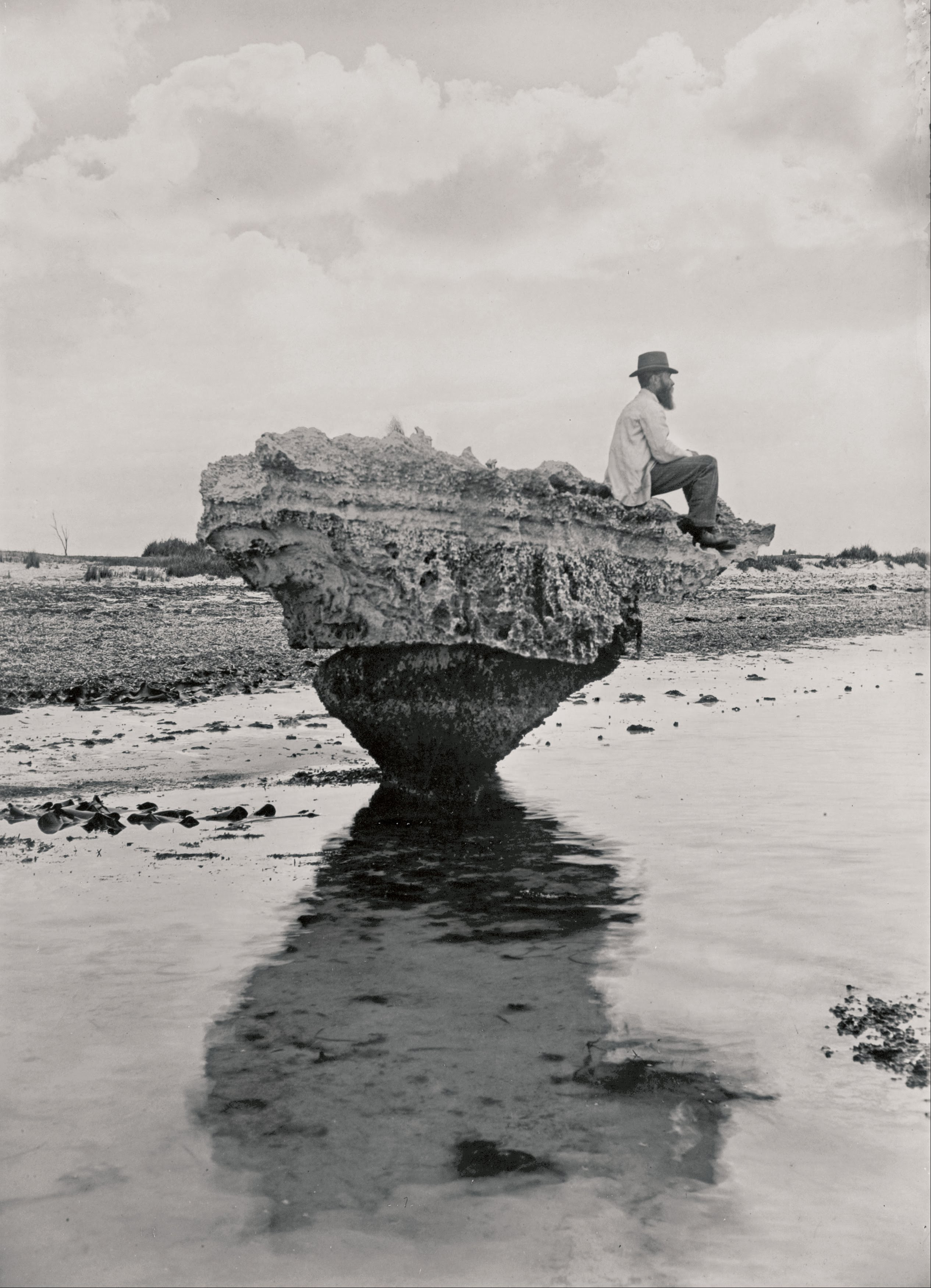
H. H. Tilbrook - Corset Rock - Google Art Project

In 1870, Tilbrook took up photography. He practiced the dry plate method. When he retired to East Adelaide in 1891 photography had become his full-time focus. Tilbrook was a keen believer in photography as an accurate and clear way to record images, and was always concerned with the quality and composition of his works. Tilbrook disliked the photography of the then new South Australian Photographic Society, especially artists like John Kauffmann and Frederick Joyner, whose pictorialist photographs would usually be blurred and "fuzzy". While speaking of one of his own photographs which during exposure had been affected by wind, Tilbrook said "in fact it was of the fuzzy order of photography - a thing to be avoided and shunned, even banned.’" He believed that to truly portray the beauty of the Australian landscape, his images needed to be sharp and focused.

== Photographic excursions ==
During retirement, Tilbrook went on various photographic trips between 1894 and 1905 throughout the Australian outback to document the landscape. Travelling mainly around the Mount Gambier and Flinders Ranges areas, he also ventured to many other smaller towns and regions. Tilbrook never made any commercial gains from the photographs he took on his trips; however, some of his prints were supplied to the railway department in 1901 to decorate the walls of train carriages.

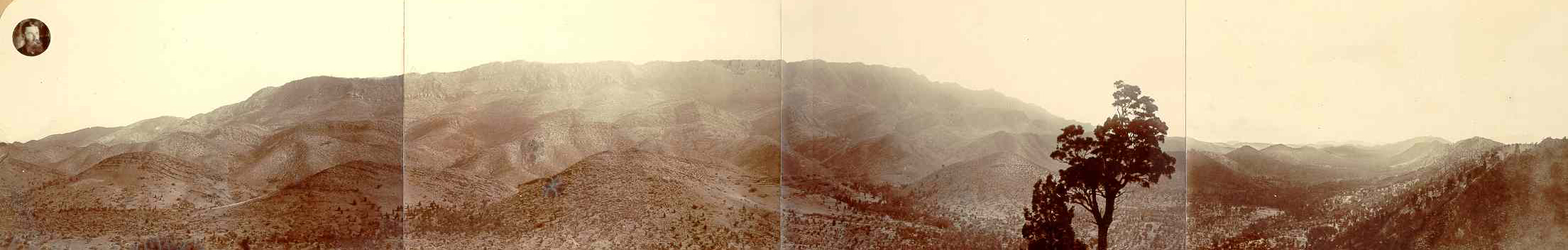
Henry Tilbrook's Panorama of Elder Range, 1894

Whilst photography was Tilbrook's main goal for the trips, he was also a keen hunter; and most of his early trips were primarily for hunting. These hunting trips gave Tilbrook the inspiration to take his camera along to future excursions. In his diary, he speaks of his 1894 trip to the Flinders Ranges: "although I took my combined hammerless gun and rifle with me, I decided as my main objective to obtain photographic records of the scenes of our explorations." While on his photographic excursions, he would often spend time on his own - or solus, as he would call it - with his camera, which usually meant carrying around very heavy packs of camera gear. "On this day I shouldered my thirty-eight pounds’ weight of photographic apparatus and marching two and a half miles onward and to and through the town took six more views of Mount Gambier and the volcanic lakes." 14 March 1898. Not only was the equipment heavy and cumbersome, but the processing was also difficult whilst on his trips. In the evenings, he would change his plates in a tent with his upper body inside a crude substitute for a darkroom: a dark bag made by his wife with a ruby glass window, which would only allow in light that wouldn't affect his plates.

"This red bag was really a small tent which I placed inside the 8 x 6 calico tent, over the shortened camera stand. With my arms, head and shoulders inside this, and the lower end tied tightly around my waist with strings to keep out all white light, and the candle outside the little ruby glass window, I changed the plates every night. It was a tiresome job, as I was on my knees all the time, and the perspiration rolled off me."

— H. H. Tilbrook

In 1905 at age 57, Tilbrook went on his last trip, which took him again to Mt. Gambier and also into Victoria. By this stage in his life he was starting to suffer quite serious health problems, which never hindered his desire to travel and continue photography. He writes in his diary that while trudging through a boggy track carrying his nearly twenty kilograms of equipment, he suddenly recalled the warning from his doctor to not "take violent exercise, or even go up steps, or carry heavy weights, or go up hills."

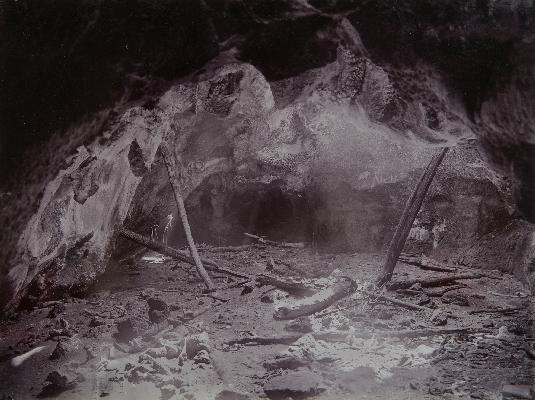
Limestone Ridge caves, Mumbannar, Victoria 1905

On this last trip, he visited several cave formations near Mumbannar, Victoria. Whilst in these dark limestone caves he used a very early form of flash photography, burning magnesium ribbon during long exposures of up to forty minutes, which created a detailed view of the interior of the dark caves.

Tilbrook was able to innovate to create his photographs. Not only was he an early adopter of artificial lighting, but he also had a clever approach to including himself in his photos. Using a reel of thread, he attached one end to the shutter and ran the other end through a series of metal pegs to wherever he was standing in the photograph. Once tightened, the thread would activate the shutter mechanism. To avoid camera shake, he used a bullet shell which would fall to the ground after setting off the shutter.

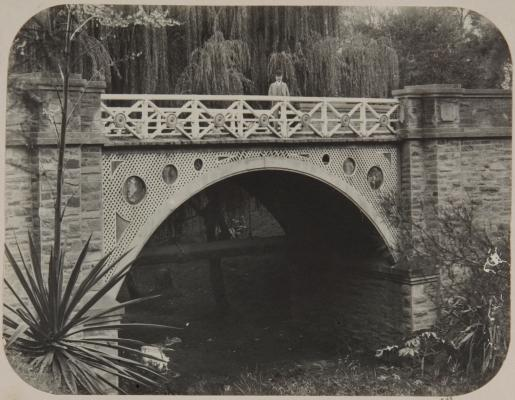
Botanic Park, Adelaide (Tilbrook standing on bridge) c1900

It is by using this method that Tilbrook was able to be in most of his well-known photographs, as well as including himself in many group photos from his trips. It is something he was to be known for after his self-portrait works began to be used on passenger trains around Adelaide. In his diary he recalls hearing a story of a lady who, after travelling on the train, remarked "I came up in a carriage with Mr Henry Tilbrook." When asked where he was going, the lady replied that she did not know, and that she "left him in the train. He was sitting on a rock – in a picture"

== Legacy ==
As well as leaving behind his photographs, which provide a detailed insight into life in the late 19th century in South Australia, Tilbrook's main contribution was the founding of his newspaper, the Northern Argus. It stayed in the Tilbrook family until 1996 when it was bought out by Rural Press. It continued to provide news for the people of Clare and the surrounding region until 2020. As of 2025, its historic archives are kept by the Clare History Group. His journals, notebooks and memoranda are held at the State Library of South Australia and have been transcribed by volunteers. To get easy direct links to each transcription, visit Henry Hammond Tilbrook : SUMMARY RECORD
