= Furchgott =

Furchgott is a surname. Notable people with the surname include:

- David Furchgott (born 1947), American artistic director
- Robert F. Furchgott (1916–2009), American biochemist
