= Temim Fruchter =

American drummer and writer

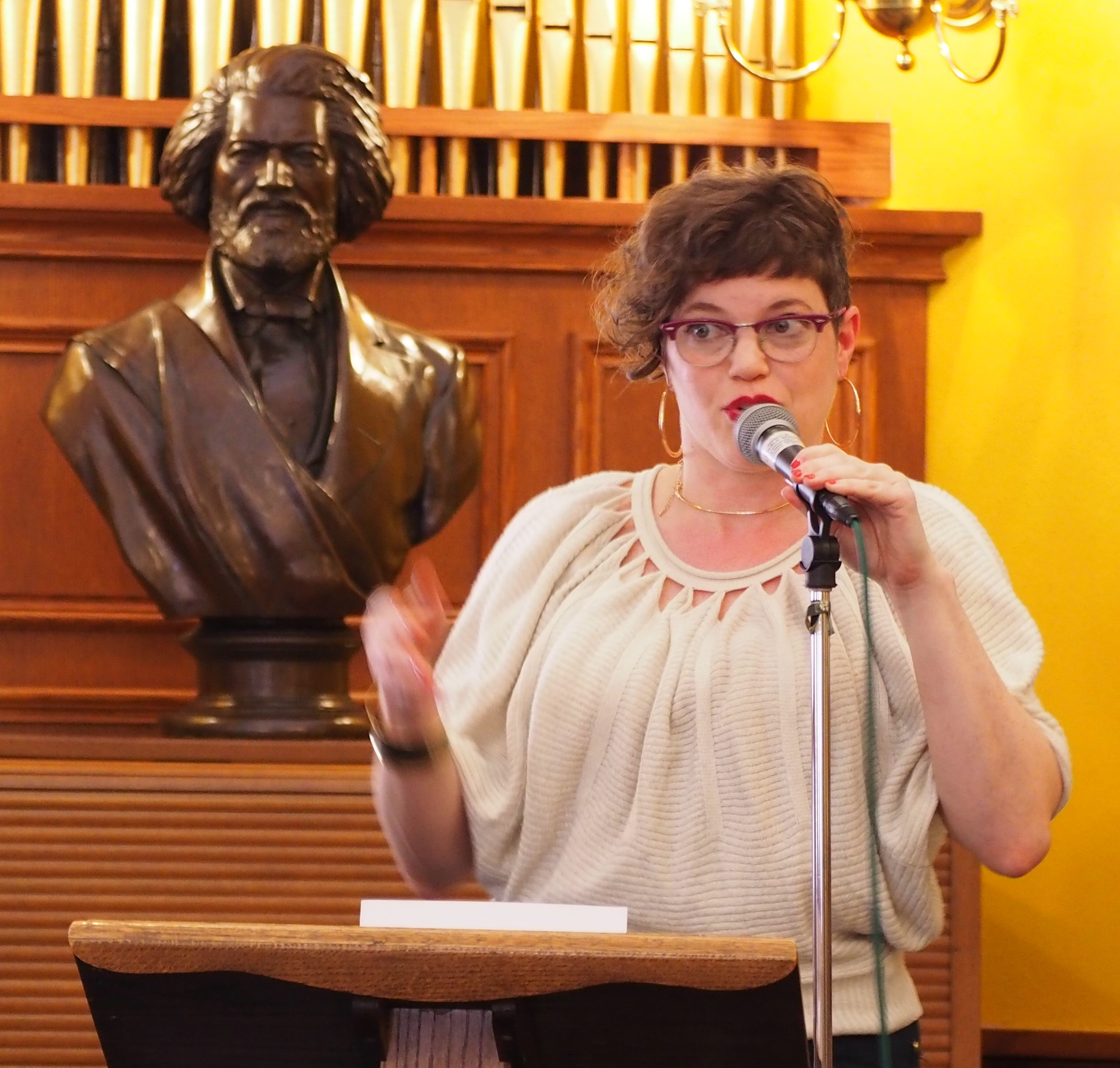
Fruchter at Split This Rock 2018, Washington, D.C.

Temim Fruchter is an American writer and formerly the drummer in The Shondes, an indie punk band from Brooklyn, NY. Fruchter is outspoken about being an Orthodox-raised Jew who opposes the occupation of Palestine. In 2007, Heeb magazine listed Fruchter as one of the Heeb 100. Temim's brother is musician Yoshie Fruchter.

Fruchter's writing has also been published in a number of venues including Brevity. She is a regular contributor to Tom Tom Magazine: a magazine about female drummers and is a former blogger for AfterEllen. A first novel, City of Laughter, was published in 2024.
