= Adolf Fruchthändler =

Austrian bedclothes producer

Adolf Fruchthändler (25 March 1899 – 10 March 1945) was a Jewish bedclothes producer living and working in Vienna, Austria. He was deported to Mauthausen concentration camp in 1945 and beaten to death few weeks before the end of the Nazi Reich.

== Life and work ==
Fruchthändler, like many Viennese Jews, was deported to the Silesian town of Opole in 1941. A Letter to the Stars reports that his last known residence was at Liebenberggasse 7 at the centre of Vienna and that he was deported on 15 February 1941. "Until March 1941 approx. 8,000 Jews were deported to the Ghetto of Opole. The new arrivals were partially housed at the homes of local Jews, partially in mass quarters such as a Synagogue or in newly erected barracks."

Briefly after his arrival in Opole, Fruchthändler successfully escaped from the Ghetto. He returned to Vienna and hid himself until the Gestapo discovered his whereabouts on 17 July 1944. He was immediately arrested and thereafter, on 16 February 1945, deported to Mauthausen. There he was beaten to death.
