= Yoshie Fruchter =

American experimental musician

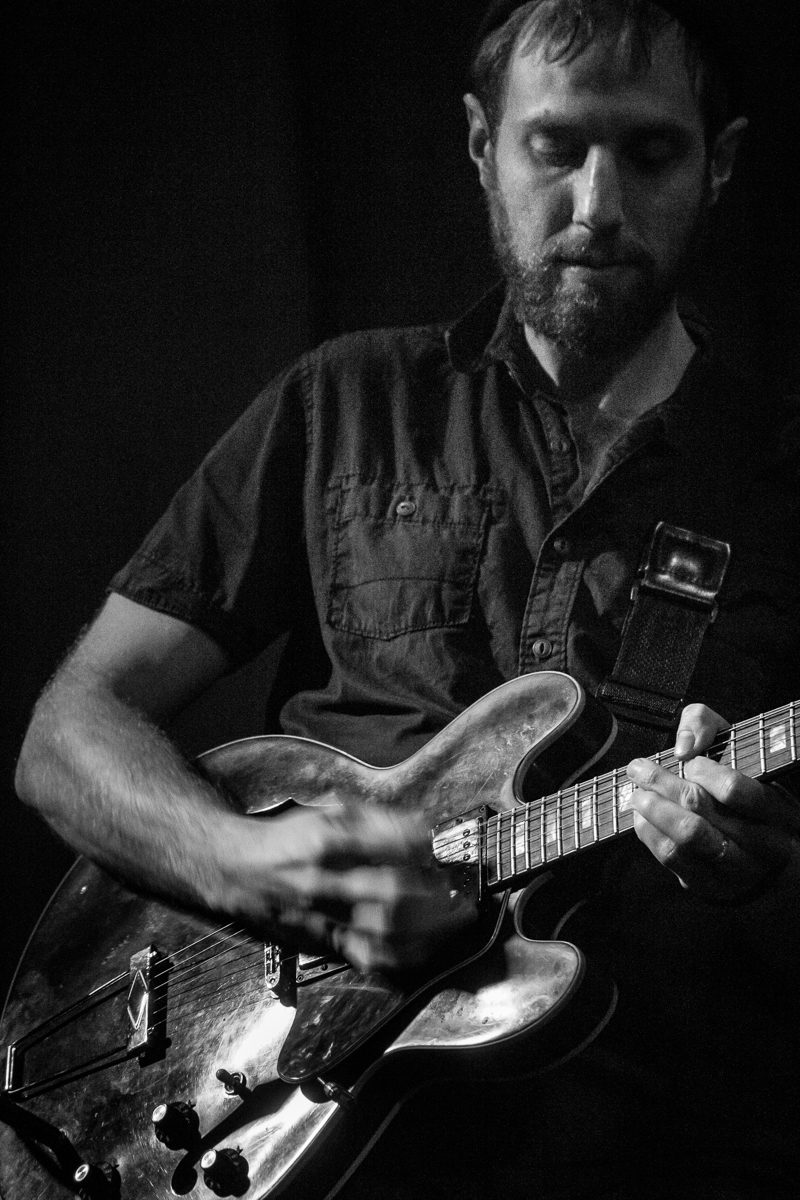

Background information
- Born: Yehoshua Fruchter; 1 February 1982 (age 44); Silver Spring, MD
- Genres: Jazz rock, klezmer, folk rock, rock, heavy metal
- Occupation: Musician
- Instruments: Guitar, bass, oud, mandolin
- Years active: 2001–present
- Labels: Tzadik Records; Blue Thread Music
- Website: yoshiefruchter.com

Yoshie Fruchter (born February 1, 1982) is an American guitarist, bassist, oud player and composer.

== Early life and education ==
Fruchter was born and raised in Silver Spring, Maryland, in an Orthodox Jewish household, singing and playing Jewish music in his youth. His father is a musician, and his sister Temim is the former drummer of the indie punk band The Shondes. He studied jazz in the music department at the University of Maryland, and moved to Brooklyn, New York, in 2005.

== Music career ==
=== Pitom ===
Fruchter's debut solo album as composer and guitarist, Pitom, was released in 2008. The Wall Street Journal called it "a dazzling debut" and JazzTimes called the debut "audacious," describing it as klezmer music with a punk sensibility. "Pitom" is Hebrew for "Suddenly," and the album was named after his band, which, along with Fruchter on guitar, includes Jeremy Brown (violin), Shanir Blumenkranz (bass) and Kevin Zubek (drums).

Pitom's second album, Blasphemy and Other Serious Crimes, was released in 2011. Fruchter again composed and played guitar, with the album further exploring Jewish music along with surf and sludge metal influences. The album was chosen by The Forward as one of the newspaper's 2011 Forward Fives, an annual list honoring five of the most important Jewish music releases of the year.

Fruchter's music combines elements of jazz, klezmer, rock, surf and heavy metal, while exploring themes of God, religion, repentance and redemption. Both Pitom albums have been released on John Zorn's Tzadik Records label. Fruchter has been described as a member of the "Radical Jewish Culture" scene, a term coined by Zorn.

=== Schizophonia ===
In December 2014, Fruchter released Cantorial Recordings Reimagined, an album with a new band called Schizophonia, in which he arranged Jewish cantorial recordings for a progressive rock quintet, with world music influences. Also in the band are Shanir Blumenkranz (bass), Brian Marsella (keyboards), Yonadav Halevy (drums) and Rich Stein (percussion).

=== Other projects ===
In 2006, Fruchter collaborated with his father, Chaim (Harold) Fruchter on Beyond the Book, an album of songs they co-wrote and produced that explore critical moments in the lives of various Biblical personalities.

Fruchter is a member of Jon Madof's 13-piece afrobeat group Zion80, playing guitar on the group's self-titled 2013 debut. In April 2014, Zion80 released its second album, Adramelech, an interpretation of John Zorn's Masada Book 2: The Book of Angels, on which Fruchter again played guitar.

Fruchter is also a frequent substitute with the instrumental rock quartet Abraxas, which also performs the music of Zorn's Masada; a member of Pakistani/American collaboration Sandaraa; doom metal band Deveykus; and Frank London's Shekhina Big Band, among other projects, many of which explore the relationship of Jewish culture, identity and music.

== Personal life ==
Fruchter resides in Brooklyn, New York, with his wife, journalist Leah Koenig, and their son. He is an observant Orthodox Jew.

== Discography ==
=== Albums ===
Year	Title
2006	Beyond the Book: By: Yoshie Fruchter and Chaim Fruchter; Released: February 2006; Label: Self-released; Formats: CD
2008	Pitom: By: Yoshie Fruchter; Released: September 16, 2008; Label: Tzadik Records; Formats: CD, digital download
2011	Blasphemy and Other Serious Crimes: By: Pitom; Released: February 22, 2011; Label: Tzadik Records; Formats: CD, digital download
2014	Cantorial Recordings Reimagined: By: Schizophonia; Released: December 15, 2014; Label: Blue Thread Music; Formats: CD, digital download

=== Appears on ===
Year	Album	Artist	Credits
2004	Shemspeed Alt Schule	Juez	Bass
2007	Eitan Katz Unplugged	Eitan Katz	Bass
2008	Monkey Dance	Soulfarm	Guitar, bass
2009	Boruch Hu	Eitan Katz	Guitar, bass
2010	Holy Ground	Soulfarm	Bass
2010	Yiddish Princess	Yiddish Princess	Guitar
2010	Have No Fear	Breslov Bar Band	Bass
2011	Eitan Katz Unplugged 2	Eitan Katz	Bass
2011	Resonance	Asefa	Guitar, oud
2011	Joey's Nigunim: Spontaneous Jewish Choir	Joey Weisenberg	Vocals
2012	Joey's Nigunim Vol. II: Transformation of a Nigun	Joey Weisenberg	Mandolin, vocals
2012	Willamette	Willamette	Guitar
2013	Shuvu	Eitan Katz	Bass
2013	Pillar Without Mercy	Deveykus	Guitar
2013	Joey's Nigunim Vol. III: Live in the Choir Loft	Joey Weisenberg and the Hadar Ensemble	Bass, vocals
2013	Zion80	Jon Madof	Guitar
2013	Happy Hour	Breslov Bar Band	Bass
2014	Joey's Nigunim Vol. IV: Brooklyn Spirituals	Joey Weisenberg and the Hadar Ensemble	Upright bass, vocals
2014	Adramelech: Book of Angels Volume 22	Zion80	Guitar
2017	Cat Toren's HUMAN KIND	Cat Toren's HUMAN KIND	Guitar, Oud
2020	Scintillating Beauty	Cat Toren's HUMAN KIND	Oud
2020	Ruthless Cosmopolitans EP	Ruthless Cosmopolitans (Eprhyme, Jon Madof)	Bass
2022	Holy Chutzpah	Breslov Bar Band	Bass
