= Fruchtman =

Fruchtman or Fruchtmann is a Jewish surname that may refer to

- Aaron Fruchtman, American composer, conductor, and musicologist
- Lisa Fruchtman (born 1948), American film and television editor, and documentary director
- Nitza Ben-Dov (née Fruchtman in 1950), Professor of Hebrew and Comparative Literature at the University of Haifa
- Uri Fruchtmann (born 1955), Israeli film producer and director
