= Peter Obst =

Australian rules footballer

Personal information
- Full name: Peter Kenneth Obst
- Born: 1937
- Died: 11 May 2017 (aged 80)
- Position: Half forward

Playing career
Years	Club	Games (Goals)
1955–1964	Port Adelaide	~150
1965–1967	Woodville	51
1968–1969	Port Adelaide	~21
Total		222

Representative team honours
Years	Team	Games (Goals)
	South Australia	4

Coaching career
Years	Club	Games (W–L–D)
1965–1967	Woodville	51

Career highlights
- 6x Port Adelaide premiership player (1956, 1957, 1958, 1959, 1962, 1963); Port Adelaide best and fairest (1962); Woodville leading goal-kicker (1967)

Peter Kenneth Obst (1937–2017) was an Australian rules footballer who played with Port Adelaide and Woodville in the South Australian National Football League (SANFL). During his time at Port Adelaide he was a member of the club's record six premierships in a row, winning the club's best and fairest in the fifth premiership year during 1962. He left Port Adelaide in 1965 to take up a coaching offer at Woodville where he stayed for three years, winning that club's leading goal-kicker award in 1967. He returned to Port Adelaide for the last two years of his playing career.

Post-playing he worked as a football commentator for the ABC.

His father Ken Obst, brother Trevor Obst and son Andrew Obst were also accomplished footballers.

He died on 11 May 2017, aged 80.
