= Jeff Potter =

Australian rules footballer (1941–2025)

Jeffrey Potter

Personal information
- Born: 10 July 1941
- Died: 26 March 2025 (aged 83)
- Height: 173 cm (5 ft 8 in)
- Weight: 79 kg (174 lb)
- Position: Rover

Playing career
Years	Club	Games (Goals)
1959–1970	Port Adelaide	235 (289)

Representative team honours
Years	Team	Games (Goals)
	South Australia	23

Career highlights
- 4× Port Adelaide premiership player (1959, 1962, 1963, 1965); 4× Port Adelaide best and fairest (1961, 1964, 1967, 1969); Port Adelaide leading goal kicker (1964); Port Adelaide life member (1967); SANFL life member

Jeffrey G. Potter (10 July 1941 – 26 March 2025) was an Australian rules footballer for the Port Adelaide Football Club between 1959 and 1970. He played in four premierships and was the club's leading goal kicker during the 1964 SANFL season.

Potter died on 26 March 2025, at the age of 83.
