= Yechezkel Shraga Halberstam =

- Title: Shinever Rov

Personal life
- Born: Yechezkel Shraga Halberstam; 1813
- Died: 19 December 1898
- Spouse: Toube Lipszyc, Brandl Eichenstein, ??? Silberstein
- Children: Naftoli Halberstam Moshe Halberstam of Shinova (wife of Pinchos Thumim-Frenkl); Simcha Yisochor Ber Halberstam of Cieszanow; Avrohom Sholom Halberstam; Arye Leybish Halberstam; Beyla Halberstam; Naftali Rubin Rov in Vishnitza ??? Bindiger
- Parents: Chaim Halberstam (father); Ruchl Frenkl-Thumim (mother)
- Dynasty: Shinova

Religious life
- Religion: Judaism

Jewish leader
- Predecessor: (founder of dynasty)
- Successor: Moshe Halberstam of Shinova
- Began: 1857
- Ended: 19 December 1898
- Main work: Divrei Yechezkel
- Dynasty: Shinova

Rabbi Yechezkel Shraga Halberstam (1813–1898), known as the Shinever Rov (Rabbi of Sieniawa), was the eldest son of the Divrei Chaim, Rabbi Chaim Halberstam of Sanz. He was famous for his disagreements with his father on matters of halakha (Jewish Law). Rabbi Yechezkel was a student of Rabbi Osher Yeshaya of Ropshitz, Rabbi Hersh of Rymanow and the Sar Shulem of Belz.

== Biography ==
Yechezkel Shraga was born in Tarnogród, Poland. At the age of 15 he married Toube, the daughter of Rabbi Arye Leib Lipszyc, author of Arye Devei Ilo'o.

He served as the rabbi of Ridnik until 1849, when he was appointed as the rabbi of Rozdol. At age 42, he became the Rabbi of Shinova where he served until 1868. He then served as the rabbi of Stropkov. He returned to Shinova in 1881.

He became known as a rabbi of rabbis, since other famous rabbis wishing to honour him, visited him. His Torah thoughts were collected in Divrei Yechezkel, which contains his commentary on the weekly parsha, responsa and minhagim, as well as a collection of his letters.

When he visited Israel, he founded the Sanzer Kloiz in Safed.

He had several sons; all of whom served as rabbis across Eastern Europe. His second son, Rabbi Moishe Halberstam, succeeded him as Rabbi of Shinova after his death on the 6th of Tevet 5659 (19 December 1898).
