= Peter Yeo =

Australian rules footballer (1947–2023)

Personal information
- Full name: Peter David Yeo
- Born: 22 May 1947
- Died: 31 October 2023 (aged 76)
- Original team: Port Adelaide Football Club
- Height: 183 cm (6 ft 0 in)
- Weight: 80.5 kg (177 lb)

Playing career^{1}
Years	Club	Games (Goals)
1972	Melbourne	3 (1)
- ^{1} Playing statistics correct to the end of 1972.

Peter David Yeo (22 May 1947 – 31 October 2023) was an Australian rules footballer. In the South Australian National Football League he played 48 games for Port Adelaide from 1965 to 1969, and 29 games for Sturt in 1970 and 1971, including their 1970 Grand Final win. He played 3 games for Melbourne in the Victorian Football League in 1972.

Yeo died on 31 October 2023.
