= Malcolm Hill (footballer) =

Australian rules footballer (1938–2024)

Personal information
- Full name: Malcolm Walker Hill
- Born: 7 October 1938
- Died: 17 May 2024 (aged 85)
- Original team: Old Scotch (VAFA)
- Height: 188 cm (6 ft 2 in)
- Weight: 92 kg (203 lb)

Playing career
Years	Club	Games (Goals)
1960–1962	Hawthorn	22 (6)
1963–1969	Sturt	40

Career highlights
- Hawthorn premiership player: (1961); Sturt premiership player: (1966, 1968, 1969)

Malcolm Walker Hill (7 October 1938 − 17 May 2024) was an Australian rules footballer footballer who played for Hawthorn in the Victorian Football League (VFL) and Sturt in the South Australian National Football League (SANFL).

Hill was a ruckman and started his career with Hawthorn in the VFL in 1960. He played three seasons of VFL football and was a premiership player in 1961.

After leaving Hawthorn, he moved to South Australia and went on to play for Sturt in the SANFL during the rest of the 1960s. He played only intermittently, appearing in a total of 40 games for Sturt over the seven years. Hill was a premiership player in 1966, 1968 and 1969.
