= John P. Murphy =

Australian rules footballer

John Murphy

Personal information
- Full name: John Patrick Murphy
- Born: 12 January 1944 (age 82)
- Height: 183 cm (6 ft 0 in)
- Weight: 86 kg (190 lb)
- Position: Ruck-rover

Playing career^{1}
Years	Club	Games (Goals)
1962–1968, 1974–1976	Sturt	205
1970–1973	South Melbourne	58 (21)
- ^{1} Playing statistics correct to the end of 1976.

John P. Murphy (born 12 January 1945) is a former Australian rules footballer who played for South Melbourne in the Victorian Football League (VFL) during the early 1970s.

A ruck-rover, he spent four seasons at South Melbourne after sitting out of football in 1969 while he awaited a clearance. When Murphy made his debut in the opening round of the 1970 season against Melbourne at Lake Oval, he was one of a group of five making their first appearances, including Gary Brice and Ricky Quade. He finished with 58 games and returned to his original club, Sturt, in 1974.

He represented South Australia at the 1966 Hobart Carnival and played a total of five games for his state over the course of his career. At Sturt he was a member of five premiership teams, the three-peat of 1966 to 1968 as well as 1974 and 1976.

His father Jack was a Copeland Trophy winner at Collingwood.
