= John Flood (cricketer) =

Australian-born Irish cricketer

Personal information
- Full name: John Wellesley Flood
- Born: 3 November 1883; Yorketown, South Australia, Australia
- Died: 21 March 1929 (aged 45); Rabaul, Territory of New Guinea
- Batting: Right-handed
- Bowling: Right-arm fast-medium

Domestic team information
- Years: Team
- 1909: Ireland

Career statistics
Competition	First-class
Matches	1
Runs scored	25
Batting average	12.50
100s/50s	–/–
Top score	16
Balls bowled	30
Wickets	0
Bowling average	–
5 wickets in innings	–
10 wickets in match	–
Best bowling	–
Catches/stumpings	–/–
- Source: Cricinfo, 2 January 2022

John Wellesley Flood (3 November 1883 in Yorketown, South Australia, Australia – 21 March 1929 in Rabaul, Territory of New Guinea) was an Australian-born Irish cricketer. A right-handed batsman and right-arm fast-medium bowler, he played just once for the Ireland cricket team, in a first-class match against Scotland in July 1909. His combined score in the two innings of his only match was 25, with his top score being 16 runs.
