= Trevor Obst =

Australian rules footballer

Personal information
- Nickname: Bubbles
- Born: 21 June 1940
- Died: 1 December 2015 (aged 75)
- Position: Back Pocket

Playing career^{1}
Years	Club	Games (Goals)
1959–1972	Port Adelaide	200 (49)

Representative team honours
Years	Team	Games (Goals)
1960–1967	South Australia	8
- ^{1} Playing statistics correct to the end of 1972.

Career highlights
- 4x Port Adelaide premiership player (1959, 1962, 1963, 1965); Magarey Medal (1967)

Trevor Obst (21 June 1940 – 1 December 2015) was an Australian rules footballer who played with Port Adelaide in the South Australian National Football League (SANFL) during the 1960s and 1970s.

Nicknamed "Bubbles", Obst was a back pocket specialist but occasionally ventured into the forward line and was used at times as a rover. In 1967 he was a surprise winner of the Magarey Medal, becoming the tenth Port Adelaide player to have won the award. He was a member of Port Adelaide premiership teams in 1959, 1962, 1963 and 1965. When he retired in 1972 he had played 205 games for the club as well as six interstate matches for South Australia.

== Personal life ==
Obst came from a famous Port Adelaide family; his father Ken, brother Peter and nephew Andrew all played with distinction for Port Adelaide.

Obst's grandson Brad Ebert also played for Port Adelaide in the AFL.
