= Ronald Elleway =

Australian rules footballer

Ron Elleway

Personal information
- Full name: Ronald Elleway
- Nickname: Ron
- Born: 2 January 1942 (age 84); Berri, South Australia
- Height: 193 cm (6 ft 4 in)
- Positions: Ruckman, Fullback

Playing career
Years	Club	Games (Goals)
1961–1971	Port Adelaide	204

Representative team honours
Years	Team	Games (Goals)
	South Australia	9

Career highlights
- 3x Port Adelaide premiership player (1962, 1963, 1965)

Ron Elleway was an Australian rules footballer who played for the Port Adelaide Football Club. During his career he played 9 games for South Australia and won 3 premierships with Port Adelaide in 1962, 1963 and 1965.
