= Ken Obst =

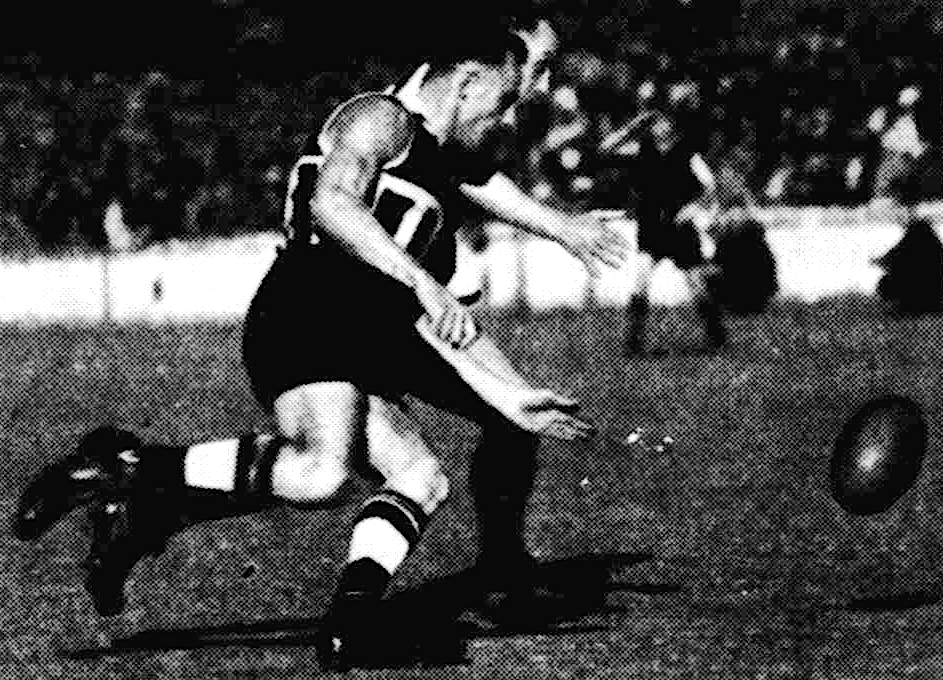
- Ken Obst competing with Norwood player Henry Batt in 1937.

Personal information
- Original team: Angaston
- Position: Defender

Playing career
Years	Club	Games (Goals)
1933–1943	Port Adelaide	165

Career highlights
- 3x Port Adelaide premiership player (1936, 1937, 1939

Ken Obst was an Australian rules footballer for the Port Adelaide Football Club during the 1930s and 1940s.
