= John Tilbrook =

Australian rules footballer

Personal information
- Born: 10 June 1946 (age 80)
- Original team: Sturt
- Height: 184 cm (6 ft 0 in)
- Weight: 94 kg (207 lb)

Playing career^{1}
Years	Club	Games (Goals)
1971–75	Melbourne	53 (59)
- ^{1} Playing statistics correct to the end of 1975.

John Tilbrook (born 10 June 1946) is a former Australian rules footballer who played with Sturt in the SANFL in five successive premiership teams from 1966 through 1970. He transferred to Melbourne in the Victorian Football League (VFL) for the 1971 season, but didn't receive clearance to play until round 12. After an attempt to convert to gridiron in 1974, along with a run of poor form and stints in the reserves, he left Melbourne after the 1975 season. Known as "Diamond Jim" due to the significant transfer fee from Sturt to Melbourne at the time, he was also affectionately called "Topaz Tilly" by Lou Richards.
