= History of the Jews in Kraków =

The history of Jews in Kraków dates back to the 13th century, marking the beginning of a long and complex presence in the city. By 1312, Jews were not only residing in designated quarters but had also begun acquiring land and property, laying the foundation for a thriving community.

== Golden Age ==
The city was an important scholarly center during the Golden Age of Polish Jewry (c. 1500-1648) and was home to prominent rabbis such as Rabbi Joel Sirkes (1561-1640), known as the "Bach" after his halachic work (published 1631-1640); and Rabbi Moses Isserles (1530-1572/82), author of the Mapah, glosses on the Shulchan Aruch of Rabbi Joseph Caro.

== The 1648–1649 Peasant Revolt ==
In 1648-1649 a peasants' revolt swept through southern Poland and Ukraine, surprising many because of its rapid spread and popular support. Because of the peasants' antisemitic leanings and because the Jews were city dwellers and not part of rural life, they were among those social groups targeted by the peasants. Thousands of Jews died, although their exact number remains unknown. In Jewish history this dramatic event is known as the ‘Gzeyres Takh Vetat’ massacre. Jewish life quickly restored after the revolt although the trust in a stable and secure existence for Jews in Kraków was lost.

== Modern History ==
Even after the events of 1648-1649 the city remained a Jewish center until the Holocaust. Rabbis included Rabbi Samuel Ehrenfeld (1835-1883), known as the Chassan Sofer. During the Nazi Germany occupation, most of the 68,000 Jews of Kraków were expelled from the city (1940), 15,000 remained in the Kraków Ghetto until 1943 when they were deported to Belzec extermination camp, where they were murdered.

Today there are roughly 1,000 Jews living in Krakow. Experts believe this number is much larger as many Poles have Jewish roots and heritage but are unaware.

== Hasidic Judaism ==
=== Rabbi David Elimelech Tzanger ===
David Elimelech Tzanger (born Nowy Sacz, Poland 1880–1962) was a rabbi and Hasidic personality in his native Poland, Canada and Israel. Tzanger was born to parents Isaac Pinchus and Hinda Rechel Tzanger (née Kirshbaum), who were followers of the Tsanz Hasidic sect. He was a disciple of the first Bobover Rebbe - Reb Shlomo Halberstam. He was originally trained as a ritual slaughterer. However, due to his extreme piety and knowledge of Jewish law, he was designated as the Krakower (Crakow) Rebbe by the then-Bobover Rebbe Ben Zion Halberstam. This was a prestigious position, as the city of Cracow was a major centre of Hasidic Judaism. Tzanger was then sent to Canada to lead the Hasidic community there and finally to Israel where he led a community of Hasidic Jews in Tel Aviv. Tzanger was buried on the Har Hamenuchot in recognition of his contribution to Judaism.

=== Radomsk ===
On the eve of World War II, Radomsk was the third largest Hasidic dynasty in Poland, after Ger and Aleksander. In Kraków, there were more Radomsker shtiebelach (places of prayer) than Gerrer shtiebelach.

=== Melitz ===
==== Rabbi Elimelech Horowitz ====
Rabbi Elimelech Horowitz (1881-1942) was a Chassidic Rebbe in Cracow, the fifth of the Melitz dynasty. He was a descendant of Rabbi Naftali Zvi Horowitz of Ropshitz. He was shot dead in the Radomysl cemetery. He was the brother-in-law of Rabbi Yechezkel Holstok of Ostrovtza.

== See also ==
- Kazimierz
- Synagogues of Kraków
- History of the Jews in Poland
- Bobov Synagogue (Kraków)
- Hasidic Judaism in Poland
- Hasidic Judaism in Lithuania
