= Floral Park Cemetery =

Jewish cemetery in South Brunswick, Middlesex County, New Jersey

Coordinates: 40°23′49″N 74°29′51″W

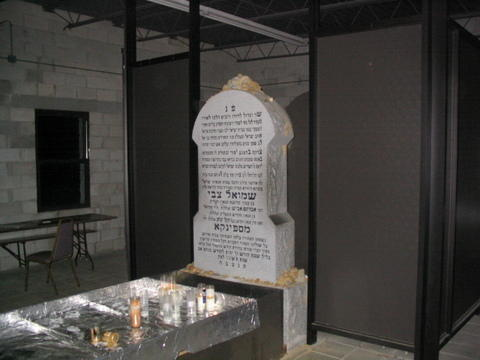
- The grave of the Spinka Rebbe of Williamsburg in Floral Park Cemetery in New Jersey
- Interactive map of Floral Park Cemetery

Details
- Location: South Brunswick, New Jersey
- Type: Jewish cemetery

Floral Park Cemetery is a Jewish cemetery in South Brunswick, New Jersey, where many prominent Hassidic Rabbis are buried, including Rabbi Shlomo Halberstam and Rabbi Naftali Halberstam of Bobov, Rabbi Hershele Horowitz of Spinka, Rabbi Yechezkel Shraga Mertz, Rabbi Avigdor of Tchenstchoiv, Rabbi Pinchos Shalom Rottenberg and his son Rabbi Menachem Yisroel Rottenberg of the Kosson, Rabbi Menachem Shlomo Taub of Kaliv, Rabbi Shalom Krausz Udvary Rov. Rabbi Moses Josef Rubin of Cimpulung and Rabbi Yitzchok Issac Langner the Stretiner Rebbe of New York City.

The cemetery contains many holocaust survivors including Yecheskel (Chaskel) Steuer, Meir (Max) Miller, Gisella (Roth) Green, Irving (Israel) Green, Ruchma Lesser & sister Rivka Gutter, Beatrice Roth, Jerry Hans, and many others from countries such as Poland, Hungary and Germany. One of the many societies represented is the first Wodzislaw Society. This was a society of holocaust survivors from Poland. Wodzislaw was one of many small villages in Poland. The society met once a month in New York City.

Across the street from the Floral Park Cemetery is the Washington Cemetery. Washington Cemetery is a separate cemetery from the Floral Park Cemetery, but both are under the same management. Many of the prominent Rabbis said to be buried in Floral Park Cemetery are actually buried in Washington Cemetery.
