= Shlomo Halberstam =

Shlomo Halberstam is the name of two rabbis of the Bobov Hasidic dynasty:

- Shlomo Halberstam (first Bobover rebbe) (1847–1905)
- Shlomo Halberstam (third Bobover rebbe) (1907–2000)
