= Solomon Halberstam =

Solomon Halberstam may refer to:

- Shlomo Halberstam (first Bobover rebbe)
- Shlomo Halberstam (third Bobover rebbe)
- Solomon Joachim Halberstam – Austrian scholar and author of the Ḳehillat Shelomoh catalog
