= Bobov Synagogue (Kraków) =

Former Orthodox synagogue in Kraków, Poland

- Polish: Synagoga chasydów z Bobowej
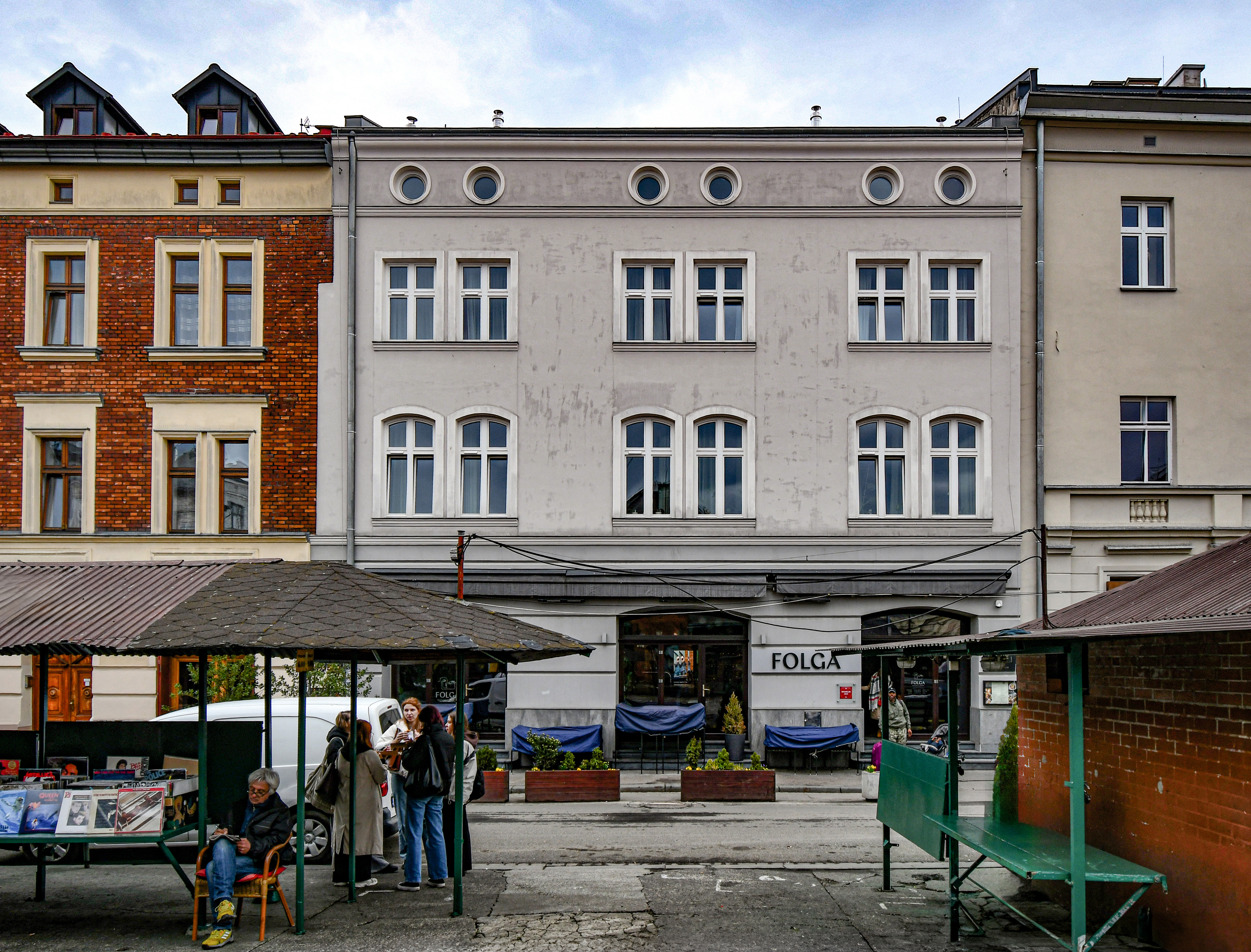
- The former synagogue in 2025

Religion
- Affiliation: Hasidic Orthodox Judaism (former)
- Rite: Nusach Ashkenaz
- Ecclesiastical or organizational status: Synagogue (1871–1939); Profane use (during WWII); Hostel (since 1990)
- Status: Inactive (as a synagogue); Repurposed

Location
- Location: 12 Estery Street; Kazimierz, Kraków
- Country: Poland
- Interactive map of Bobov Synagogue
- Coordinates: 50°03′06.6″N 19°56′43.7″E

Architecture
- Type: Synagogue architecture
- Completed: 1871
- Materials: Stone

UNESCO World Heritage Site
- Type: Cultural
- Criteria: iv
- Designated: 1978
- Part of: Historic Centre of Kraków
- Reference no.: 29
- Region: Europe and North America

Historic Monument of Poland
- Designated: 1994-09-08
- Part of: Kraków historical city complex
- Reference no.: M.P. 1994 nr 50 poz. 418

The Bobov Synagogue (Polish: Synagoga chasydów z Bobowej) is a former Hasidic Orthodox Jewish congregation and synagogue, located at 12 Estery Street, in the historic Kazimierz district of Kraków, Poland.

Completed in 1871, the synagogue was established by followers of Rabbi Shlomo Halberstam of Bobov.

== History ==
The synagogue was founded on the first story of an apartment block and also contained a Talmudic school which was situated adjacent to the prayer hall. During World War II, the Nazis vandalized the synagogue. At the end of the war, the synagogue was converted into apartments. Since the summer of 1990, it has been used as a hostel for the poor. Nothing remains today indicating its former use as a synagogue.

== See also ==
- Chronology of Jewish Polish history
- Culture of Kraków
- History of the Jews in Poland
- List of active synagogues in Poland
- Synagogues of Kraków
