= Ropshitz =

Ropshitz may refer to

- the town Ropczyce in southern Poland
- chasidic dynasty Ropshitz emanating from that town
