= Naftali Halberstam =

American rabbi (1931–2005)

- נפתלי צבי הלברשטאם
- Naftali Halberstam on the Jewish holiday of Sukkot
- Title: Fourth Bobover Rebbe

Personal life
- Born: Naftali Tzvi Halberstam; June 10, 1931 [25 Sivan, 5691]
- Died: March 23, 2005 (aged 73) [12 Adar, 5765]
- Buried: Floral Park Cemetery, Deans, New Jersey
- Spouse: Hesa
- Parent: Shlomo Halberstam (father)
- Dynasty: Bobov (Hasidic dynasty)

Religious life
- Religion: Judaism

Jewish leader
- Predecessor: Shlomo Halberstam
- Successor: Benzion Aryeh Leibish Halberstam (Bobov); Mordechai David Unger (Bobov-45)
- Dynasty: Bobov (Hasidic dynasty)

Naftali Tzvi Halberstam (Hebrew: ר' נפתלי צבי הלברשטאם, June 10, 1931 – March 23, 2005) was the fourth Grand Rebbe of Bobov. He succeeded his father, Shlomo Halberstam, as Grand Rebbe from August 2000 until March 2005. His death led to a succession crisis within Bobov.

== Early life ==
Naftali Tzvi Halberstam was born in Bobowa, Poland to Shlomo Halberstam, the third Bobover Rebbe. His mother and two siblings were murdered in the Holocaust. Towards the end of the war, Naftali's father had arranged for him to go to Mandatory Palestine. Shlomo remained in Europe, and Naftali was unsure if his father had survived the war. Halberstam lived for several years in Israel, where he received his rabbinical ordination.

== Career ==
In 1951, after discovering that his father had indeed survived the war and relocated to New York in the late 1940s, he joined him there, and discovered that his father had meanwhile remarried. Halberstam, who was described by Samuel Heilman as "[living] in the shadow of his father" during this period, also had a half-brother, Ben Zion. Upon his father's death in 2000, Halberstam became the Grand Rebbe of Bobov in Borough Park, Brooklyn, at age 69. Ill with Parkinson's disease, he died on March 23, 2005 and was buried next to his father in Floral Park Cemetery, in Deans, New Jersey. His death led to a succession crisis in Bobov, with some Bobovers supporting his half-brother, while others followed his son-in-law, Mordechai Dovid Unger.

== Personal life ==
Halberstam left no sons, only two daughters. His older daughter is married to Yehoshua Rubin, the current Bobov-45 dayan (judge). His younger daughter is married to Unger, the first Bobov-45 Rebbe. Halberstam's wife, Hesa, died on May 15, 2011 (11 Iyar, 5771) aged 80.

== Rebbes of Bobov ==
1. Shlomo Halberstam (1847–1905) grandson of the Sanzer Rebbe, Chaim Halberstam
2. Ben Zion Halberstam (1874–1941)
3. Shlomo Halberstam (1907–2000)
4. Naftali Halberstam (1931–2005)
5. Mordechai Dovid Unger (b.1954), current Rebbe, son in law of Naftali Halberstam

== See also ==
- Satmar succession feud
- Klausenburg (Hasidic dynasty)
- Ropshitz (Hasidic dynasty)
- Sanz (Hasidic dynasty)

== Sources ==
- Heilman, Samuel C. (December 2013). "What's in a Name? The Dilemma of Title and Geography for Contemporary Hasidism". Jewish History. 27 (2–4): 221–240. doi:10.1007/s10835-013-9187-5. S2CID 254602685. ProQuest 1460841654.

Religious titles
Preceded by Grand Rabbi Shlomo Halberstam	Rebbe of Bobov; 2000–2005	Succeeded by Grand Rabbi Ben Zion Aryeh Leibish Halberstam
