= Ben Zion Aryeh Leibish Halberstam =

American rabbi (born 1955)

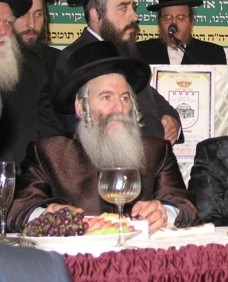
- Halberstam at a Kolel Chibas Yerushalayim gathering
- Title: Bobover Rebbe

Personal life
- Born: Ben Zion Aryeh Leibish Halberstam; 1955 (age 70–71) New York
- Spouse: Rosa Wachsman
- Children: Chaim Shulem; Chaya Fradl; Dovid; Chana Ruchel; Rifkah Sheindel; Mordechai Dov; Yechezkel Shraga; Avrohom Yehoshua Heshil; Miriam Beila; Nechumah; Yisroel Elimelech; Shlomo
- Parents: Shlomo Halberstam (father); Freida Rubin (mother)
- Dynasty: Bobov

Religious life
- Religion: Judaism

Jewish leader
- Predecessor: Naftali Halberstam
- Began: March 23, 2005
- Ended: Current
- Dynasty: Bobov

Ben Zion Aryeh Leibish Halberstam (Hebrew: בן ציון אריה לייבוש הלברשטאם; born 1955) is an American born Hasidic rabbi. He is the current Rebbe of the Bobov Hasidic dynasty. Appointed in 2005, Halberstam has a direct lineage to the founder of the Bobov Hasidic dynasty.

== Early life ==
Ben Zion Aryeh Leibish Halberstam was born to the third Bobover rebbe Shlomo Halberstam and his second wife. His father had lost his first wife and most of their children in the Holocaust, but a son, and Ben Zion's half brother, Naftali Halberstam, survived. Naftali was later reunited with the family in Borough Park, Brooklyn.

== Appointment ==
In 2000, Naftali was appointed as fourth Bobover Rebbe at age 69, following the death of his father, Third Bobover Rebbe Shlomo Halberstam. Naftali died right before the holiday of Purim in 2005, which led to a succession crisis between Ben Zion Halberstam (Naftali's half brother and son of prior Bobover Rebbe Shlomo Halberstam), and Rabbi Mordechai Dovid Unger (Naftali's son-in-law), over who should be the Grand Rebbe of the worldwide Bobov community. When a vote failed to solve the matter, the succession question was brought before a beth din (religious court) in 2007, which ultimately ruled that Ben Zion Halberstam would be declared the fifth Rebbe of Bobov (אדמו"ר מבאבוב) with its headquarters on 48th Street in Borough Park, while Unger could take the title Rebbe of Bobov-45 (אדמו"ר מבאבוב-45), headquartered three blocks away on 45th Street.

== Career ==
In 2014, Halberstam launched Kinyan Torah, a program to encourage laymen to learn Talmud. Those enrolled in the program were able to take the monthly test and those who scored an 80 or above earned a stipend. The program was expanded to include young children in 2023. At times over a thousand test takers were recorded.

In 2021, he launched a $125 million campaign to build new schools for the elementary boys and girl school.

As of 2024, Bobov has satellite communities in Monsey; Toronto; Lakewood NJ; Linden NJ; London; Montreal; Antwerp; and Williamsburg NY; in addition to many locations in Israel.

== Rebbes of Bobov ==
1. Shlomo Halberstam (1847–1905), grandson of the Sanzer Rebbe, Chaim Halberstam
2. Ben Zion Halberstam (1874–1941)
3. Shlomo Halberstam (1907–2000)
4. Naftali Halberstam (1931–2005), older son of Shlomo Halberstam
5. Ben Zion Aryeh Leibish Halberstam (b. 1955), younger son of Shlomo Halberstam

== See also ==
- Bobowa
- Chaim Halberstam

== Sources ==
- Heilman, Samuel C. (December 2013). "What's in a Name? The Dilemma of Title and Geography for Contemporary Hasidism". Jewish History. 27 (2–4): 221–240. doi:10.1007/s10835-013-9187-5. S2CID 254602685. ProQuest 1460841654.

Religious titles
Preceded by Grand Rabbi Naftali Zvi Halberstam of Bobov	Grand Rebbe of Bobov; 2005–	Succeeded by Current incumbent
