= Mordechai Dovid Unger =

Hasiddic Jewish leader (born 1954)

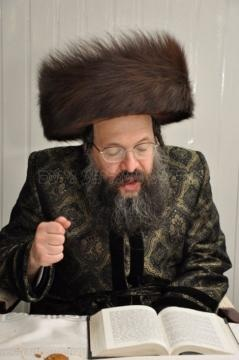
- Title: Rebbe of Bobov-45

Personal life
- Born: Mordechai Dovid Unger; 1954 (age 71–72) New York
- Spouse: Rivka Halberstam
- Children: Yosef, Shulim, Chaim Benzion, Yechezkel, Moshe Yehoshea
- Parent: Yaakov Yitzchok Unger (father)
- Dynasty: Bobov - Bobov-45

Religious life
- Religion: Judaism

Jewish leader
- Predecessor: Naftali Halberstam
- Began: March 23, 2005
- Ended: Current
- Main work: Sheira D'bei Rav
- Dynasty: Bobov - Bobov-45

Mordechai Dovid Unger (Hebrew: הרב מרדכי דוד אונגער, born 1954) is the first Rebbe of Bobov-45. Upon the passing of his father-in-law, Unger was appointed Rebbe of a breakaway group of Bobover Chassidim who wanted to be independent of the fifth and current Bobover Rebbe.

== Biography ==
Unger was born to Yaakov Yitzchok Unger of Dombrov. He is the younger son-in-law of Naftali Zvi Halberstam, the fourth Bobover Rebbe.

Following the death of his father-in-law right before the Purim holiday in 2005, a dispute arose as to who should be the Grand Rebbe of the then 120,000 Bobov Hasidim worldwide. While the majority began to follow Ben Zion Aryeh Leibish Halberstam, his father-in-law's half-brother, others followed the older (by one year) Unger, who had by then already ensconced himself firmly within the community. Unger could not challenge his own father for leadership of Dombrov, which anyway was not as substantial a dynasty as Bobov. The matter of succession was brought before a beth din (religious court) in 2007, which ruled that Halberstam would be declared Rebbe of Bobov (אדמו"ר מבאבוב) with its headquarters on 48th Street in Borough Park, Brooklyn, while Unger would be Rebbe of Bobov-45 (אדמו"ר מבאבוב-45), located on 49th Street.

== Rebbes of Bobov ==
1. Shlomo Halberstam (1847–1905), grandson of the Sanzer Rebbe, Chaim Halberstam
2. Ben Zion Halberstam (1874–1941)
3. Shlomo Halberstam (1907–2000)
4. Naftali Halberstam (1931–2005)
5. Mordechai Dovid Unger (b. 1954), son-in-law of Naftali Halberstam

== Politics ==
Brooklyn Borough President Eric Adams visited Bobov–45 as part of his 2017 re-election campaign.

== Sources ==
- Heilman, Samuel C. (December 2013). "What's in a Name? The Dilemma of Title and Geography for Contemporary Hasidism". Jewish History. 27 (2–4): 221–240. doi:10.1007/s10835-013-9187-5. S2CID 254602685. ProQuest 1460841654.
