= Sanz =

Polish Hasidic dynasty

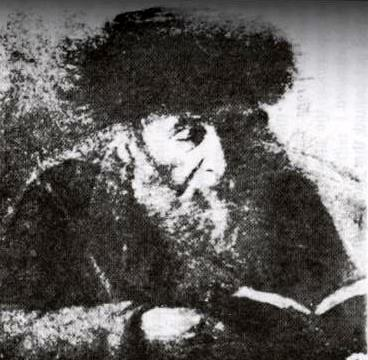
Rabbi Chaim Halberstam, founder of the Sanz dynasty

Sanz (or Tsanz, Yiddish: צאנז) is a Hasidic dynasty originating in the city of Sanz (Nowy Sącz) in Galicia. The dynasty was founded by the rebbe Rabbi Chaim Halberstam (1793–1876) who was the rabbi of Nowy Sącz and the author of the work Divrei Chaim by which name he is known as well.

Rabbi Chaim was a disciple of Rabbi Naftali Zvi of Ropshitz. (Note: Who was a disciple of Rabbi Elimelech of Lizhensk, a disciple of the Maggid of Mezritch, the leading disciple of the Baal Shem Tov, the founder of Hasidism.) He opened his court after the death of Rabbi Asher Yeshaya of Ropshitz, son-in-law of Rabbi Naftali Tzvi.

After his demise (25 Nisan 5636, 19 April 1876), his six sons and his seven sons-in-law built courtyards with new names in the cities where they served as rabbis, and their chassidim separated, but most of them went to his eldest son, Rabbi Yechezkel Shraga Halberstam of Shinova. His fourth son, Rabbi Aharon, remained to serve as rabbi and rebbe in Sanz, but he was known as the 'Rav of Kreiz', that is, the rabbi of the province, a title he already had in his father's life. In the generations that followed, there were divisions within the courtyards of the dynasty and dozens of different courts were established from the dynasty, and existed until the Holocaust.

== Sanz dynasty ==
The Divrei Chaim had fourteen children; his seven sons were:

1. Rabbi Yechezkel Shraga Halberstam (1814–1898) of Shinive;
2. Rabbi Duvid Halberstam (1821–1894) of Kshaniv;
3. Rabbi Myer Nosson Halberstam (1827–1855), father of Rabbi Shlomo Halberstam, the first Bobover Rebbe;
4. Rabbi Boruch Halberstam (1829–1906) of Gorlice (גארליץ Gorlitz);
5. Rabbi Aharon Halberstam, his successor in Nowy Sącz;
6. Rabbi Shulem Lazer Halberstam of Ratzfert (1862–1944), who was murdered by the Nazis in the Holocaust;
7. Rabbi Yitzchok Yeshaye Halberstam of Czchów (טשחויווTshkhoiv) (1864–1944), who was also murdered by the Nazis;

and seven daughters:

1. Reitza who married Rabbi Mordechai Dov Twerski, the Admor of Hornsteipl.
2. Miryam who married Rabbi Moshe Unger, son of Rabbi Mordechai David of Dombrov.
3. Yuta who married Rabbi Eliezer Yerucham Baron, son of Rabbi Yisrael Yitzchak Baron of Radoshitz
4. Nechama who married Rabbi Yitzchak Tuvia Rubin, rabbi of "New Sanz" and son of Rabbi Meir Rubin of Glogov-Dombrova
5. Tila who married Rabbi Aharon Horowitz, Admor of Beitsh (Biecz), son of Rabbi Meir Horowitz of Dzikov
6. Freidel who married Rabbi Elazar HaLevi Rosenfeld, Av Beit Din of Oswiecim, son of Rabbi Yehoshua HaLevi Rosenfeld of Kaminke [HE]
7. ?

== Offshoots ==
=== Bobov ===
- Rabbi Chaim Halberstam (1793–1876) of Sanz
  - Rabbi Mayer Noson Halberstam (1827–1855), son of Rabbi Chaim of Sanz
    - Rabbi Shlomo Halberstam (1847–1905), first Bobover Rebbe, author of Ateres Shlomo, son of Rabbi Mayer Noson
      - Rabbi Ben Zion Halberstam (1874–1941), second Bobover Rebbe, author of Kedushas Tzion, son of Rabbi Shlomo Halberstam
        - Rabbi Shlomo Halberstam (1907–2000), third Bobover Rebbe, son of Rabbi Ben Zion
          - Rabbi Naftali Tzvi Halberstam (1931–2005) fourth Bobover Rebbe, son of Rabbi Shlomo Halberstam
          - Rabbi Ben Zion Aryeh Leibish Halberstam (born 1955), present Bobover Rebbe, son of Rabbi Shlomo (II)
            - Rabbi Mordechai Dovid Unger (born 1954) present Bobov-45 Rebbe, son-in-law of Rabbi Naftali Tzvi

=== Sanz ===
- Rabbi Chaim Halberstam of Sanz
  - Rabbi Aaron Halberstam (1826–1903), Sanzer Rav; son of Rabbi Chaim
    - Rabbi Arye Leibish Halberstam (1852–1935), Sanzer Rav; son of Rabbi Aaron
      - Rabbi Mordechai Zev Halberstam (1882–1942), Sanzer Rav; son of Rabbi Aryeh Leibish
        - Rabbi Boruch Halberstam (1903–1942), Gribover Rav; son of Rabbi Mordechai Zev
          - Rabbi Naftali Halberstam, Sanz-Gribover Rebbe in Boro Park, son of Rabbi Boruch
            - Rabbi Ahron halberstam, Sanzer Rebbe in Staten island, son of Rabbi Naftali
            - Rabbi kalmon halberstam, Sanzer Rebbe in Monroe, son of Rabbi Naftali

The following dynasties stem from Rabbi Boruch Halberstam, the Gorlitser Rov:

=== Gorlitz ===
- Grand Rabbi Chaim Halberstam of Sanz
  - Grand Rabbi Boruch Halberstam of Gorlitz, son of Rabbi Chaim of Sanz
    - Grand Rabbi Elisha Halberstam (1860–1941) – died in Siberia
      - Grand Rabbi Boruch Halberstam (died 1982) of Gorlitz-Bnei Brak, son-in-law of Rabbi Yisochor Shlomo Teichtal of Pishtian, author of Eim Habonim S'meicho

=== Klausenburg ===
- Grand Rabbi Chaim Halberstam (1793–1876) of Sanz
  - Grand Rabbi Baruch Halberstam (1829–1906) of Gorlitz, son of Rabbi Chaim of Sanz
    - Grand Rabbi Tzvi Hirsh Halberstam (1851–1918), of Ridnik, son of Rabbi Baruch
      - Grand Rabbi Yekusiel Yehudah Halberstam (1904–1994), the First Klausenberger Rebbe, son of Rabbi Tzvi
        - Grand Rabbi Zvi Elimelech Halberstam, present Kiryat Sanzer Rebbe in Kiryat Sanz, Netanya, Israel, son of Rabbi Yekusiel Yehudah
        - Grand Rabbi Shmuel Dovid Halberstam, present Klausenberger Rebbe in Brooklyn, New York, USA, son of Rabbi Yekusiel Yehudah

=== Zhmigrod ===
- Grand Rabbi Chaim Halberstam of Sanz
  - Grand Rabbi Baruch Halberstam of Gorlitz, son of Rabbi Chaim of Sanz
    - Grand Rabbi Sinai Halberstam (1870–1941), the first Zhmigroder Rebbe, a son of Rabbi Boruch of Gorlitz; died in the Omsk forest, Siberia.
      - Grand Rabbi Aryeh Leibish Halberstam (1909–7 January 2007), the second Zhmigroder Rebbe, son-in-law of the Stretiner Rebbe, Grand Rabbi Yehuda Tsvi Brandwein. Author of Arye Sho'ag, died in Netanya. In his youth he studied under the Tshebiner Rov and Rabbi Meir Shapiro. During World War II had to leave Zhmigrid for Kraków, then Lviv and eventually Siberia. He served as a rebbe in Petah Tikva, where he found the Divrei Chaim Synagogue, Yafo and Bnei Brak. For a short period in 1950 he lived in Antwerp.
        - Grand Rabbi Sinai Halberstam, third and the current Zhmigroder Rebbe, son of Rabbi Aryeh Leibish
        - Grand Rabbi Yehosua Halberstam, Zhmigroder Rebbe of Antwerp, son of Rabbi Aryeh Leibish
        - Grand Rabbi Chaim Halberstam, Zhmigroder Rebbe of Bnei Brak, son of Rabbi Aryeh Leibish
      - Grand Rabbi Yisrael Halberstam, Zhmigroder Rebbe of America
        - Grand Rabbi Sinai Halberstam, Zhmigroder Rebbe of Borough Park (43rd Street), son of Rabbi Yisrael

=== Tshakove ===
- Grand Rabbi Yaakov Halberstam (1902–1967), the Tshakover Rebbe, son-in-law of the Shotzer Rebbe
  - Grand Rabbi Meir Halberstam, Tshakover Rebbe of Bnei Brak (died 2011)
  - Grand Rabbi Naftali Halberstam, Tshakover Rebbe of Jerusalem
  - Rabbi Moshe Halberstam, (1932 – 2006) Rosh Yeshiva of Tshakove in Jerusalem, halachic authority and member of the Edah HaChareidis.
  - Rabbi Chacham Tzvi Halberstam (1937–1972), author of Toldot ha-Maggid mi-Kozhnits.
    - Rabbi Sinai Halberstam, rabbi of the Shikkun Gimel district of Bnei Brak
    - Grand Rabbi Naftali Elimelech Halberstam, Leipniker Rebbe of Bnei Brak

== Books of the Sanz movement ==
The main Hasidic works revered by the Sanz Dynasty are Divrei Chaim, by Rabbi Chaim Halberstam of Tsanz and Divrei Yechezkel by his son, Rabbi Yechezkel Shraga Halberstam.

== Names ==
The place name Sanz in Poland should not be confused with the city Sens in France, for which another name is Shanz, as in Tos'fos Shanz, the title of famous commentators of the Talmud. Shanz is also sometimes spelled Shantz.

== See also ==
- Klausenburg (Hasidic dynasty)
- Bobov (Hasidic dynasty)
