= Moses Josef Rubin =

Romanian-American rabbi (1892–1980)

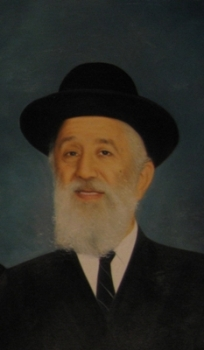
Moses Josef Rubin

Rabbi Moses Josef Rubin (1892–1980) was leading rabbinic figure in Romania and later in the United States (New York City), a scion of the Kosov-Seret dynasty.

== Biography ==
Moses Josef Rubin was born in 1892 in the town of Wola Michowa in the Galicia region of Poland.

His father was Rabbi Mendel Rubin, who later became the Chassidic Rebbe in Siret, Bukovina. His mother was Beila Rubin née Horowitz.

When Moses Josef was a toddler he and his family moved from Galicia to Siret in the Bukovina where his father's family resided.

During his youth, Moses Josef was Rabbinically ordained by the leading Halachik figures of his time such as Rabbi Chaim Tzvi Teitelbaum of Sighet and Rabbi Yehuda Leib Tsirelson of Kishinev among others,

In 1921 he married Sarah Farkas. They had two sons; Dr. Samuel S. Rubin and Dr. Jacob K. Rubin.

During the years 1922–1940, in Greater Romania, he served as Chief Rabbi of the Jewish-Romanian community in Câmpulung Moldovenesc, Bukovina. From 1941 until 1946 he served as President of the Rabbinical Council of Romania and Chairman of Agudath Israel in Romania.

In 1940, on Yom Kippur (the Day of Atonement, October 12), all Jewish homes in Câmpulung were plundered, and the Jews were assaulted by the pro-Nazi Iron Guard (see Romania during World War II). The valuable library of Rabbi Rubin was destroyed; he was mistreated and was given a document to sign which stated that he had hidden dynamite in the synagogue to be used in acts of sabotage. Because he refused to sign this document, he and his son were harnessed to a cart loaded with stolen goods, and driven at revolver point while being beaten and humiliated. After the incident, the Rabbi and his family escaped to Bucharest.

During World War II, Rubin founded the first Vaad Hatzalah (emergency committee) in Bucharest, in order to aid Jewish people deported to the Transnistria concentration camps.

After the war, Rabbi Rubin emigrated to the United States where he founded the Center for European Rabbis, whose aims included distributing post-war reparations for European Rabbis who had lost their communities and source for income, as well as the Geder Avos project to prevent the destruction of Jewish cemeteries in Europe. More than four decades after Rabbi Rubin's passing the activities of Geder Avos continue, working in close cooperation with the Israel-based "Oholei Zadikim" run by Rabbi Israel Meir Gabay., and separately with the German based ESJF European Jewish Cemeteries Initiative.

From 1962 until his passing in 1980, Rabbi Rubin served as the head of the Rabbinical court of Borough Park, Brooklyn.
