= Bobowa =

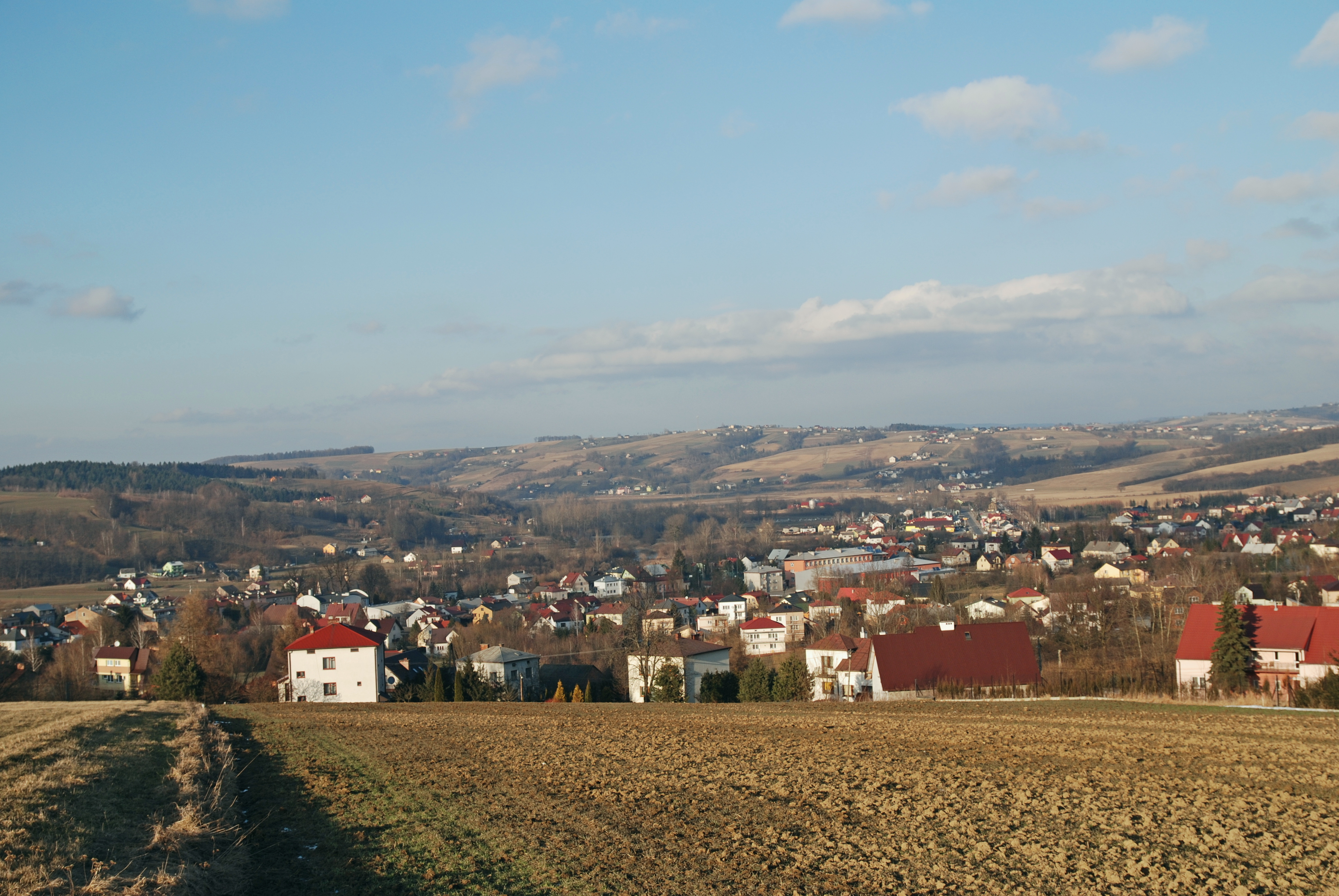
- Panorama of the town

- Flag Coat of arms
- Interactive map of Bobowa
- Location within Poland
- Coordinates: 49°42′31″N 20°56′41″E
- Country: Poland
- Voivodeship: Lesser Poland
- County: Gorlice
- Gmina: Bobowa
- First mentioned: 1339
- City rights: 1339-1934, 2009

Government
  - Mayor: Wacław Ligęza

Area
  - Total: 7.18 km^{2} (2.77 sq mi)

Population (31 December 2021)
  - Total: 3,101
  - Density: 432/km^{2} (1,120/sq mi)
- Time zone: UTC+1 (CET)
  - Summer (DST): UTC+2 (CEST)
- Postal code: 38-350
- Area code: +48 18
- Car plates: KGR
- Website: http://www.bobowa.pl/

Bobowa [bɔˈbɔva] (Yiddish: בּאָבּאָוו, Bobov) is a small town in Gorlice County, southern Poland. Administratively part of the Lesser Polish Voivodeship, it is situated 18 kilometres (11 miles) west of Gorlice and 83 km (52 mi) south-east of the regional capital Kraków. It was formerly a village, but was granted town status on 1 January 2009. Bobowa is also located on a railway line running from Tarnów to the border with Slovakia at Leluchów. As of December 2021, the town has a population of 3,101.

== History ==
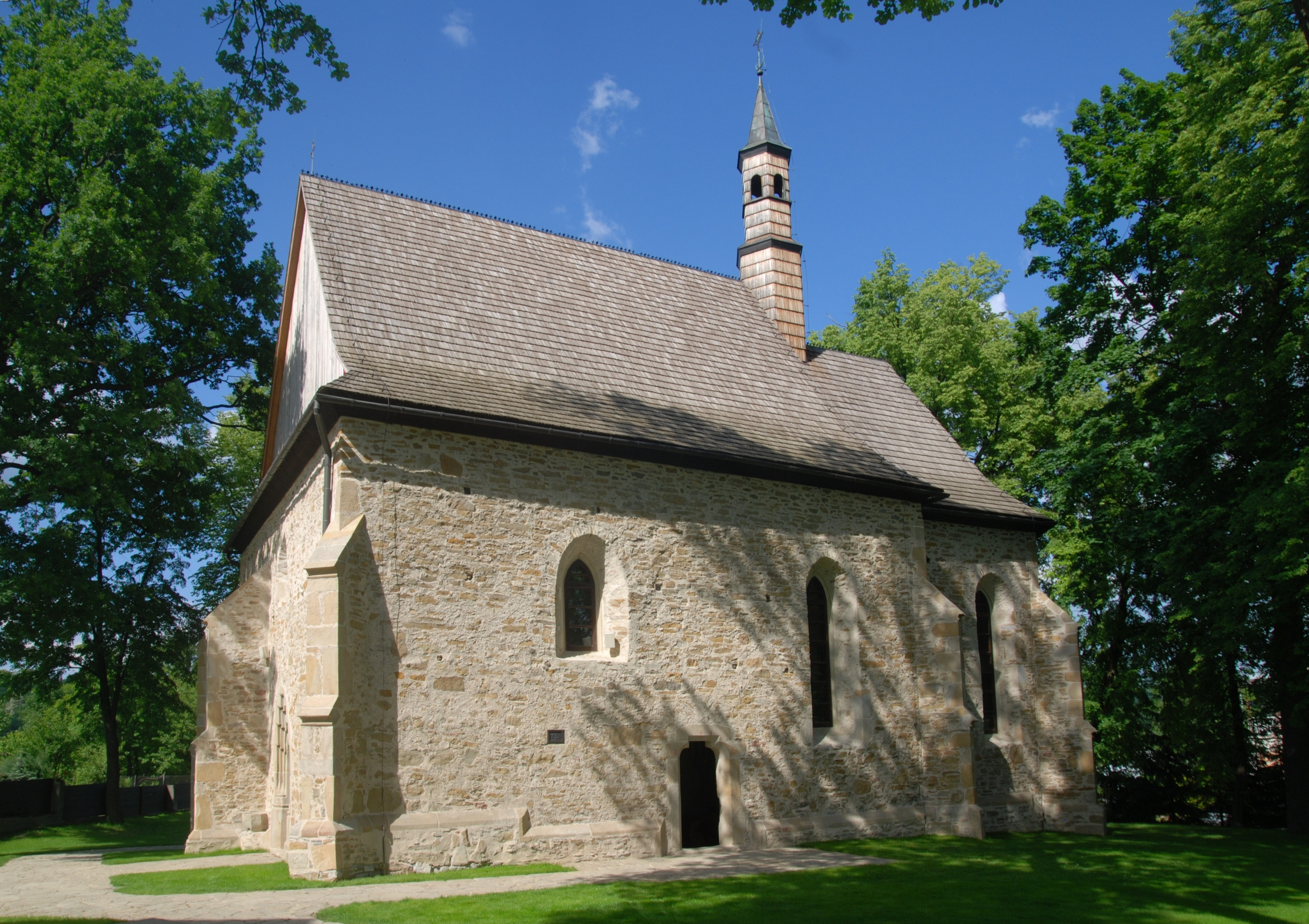
St. Sophia Church

It is not known when the village of Bobowa appeared on the map of Poland. It probably was a Slavic gord, destroyed in 1240 (see Mongol invasion of Poland). Bobowa received Magdeburg rights town charter in 1339. By 1346, the town already had a parish church, and Bobowa at that time belonged to the Gryfita family (Gryf coat of arms). In the 1460 register Liber beneficiorum by Jan Długosz, one can find the information of Bobowa’s stone parish church, as well as two smaller, wooden churches. The town still belonged to the Gryfita family, and according to Długosz, it had three owners – Mikołaj, Jan and Gietko Gryfita. Furthermore, Bobowa had a court and wójt, who in 1467 was a man named Jan Lempart.

In the mid-16th-century Bobowa emerged as a local center of the Protestant Reformation, and some time in the early 17th century, the town was purchased by the Jordan family. In 1740 its owner was Stanisław Łętowski. Following the Partitions of Poland, Bobowa in 1772 became part of Austrian province of Galicia, where it remained until late 1918. In 1934, the government of the Second Polish Republic stripped Bobowa of its town charter due to its depopulation. Bobowa regained its town status on January 1, 2009.

== Jews in Bobowa ==
The Jews were brought to Bobowa by Michał Jaworski in 1732 in order to improve the town's economy. A synagogue was erected in 1756 serving the needs of 44 families. In 1900 the Jewish population of Bobowa numbered 749. Before the Holocaust in Poland, the town was home to a yeshiva, notable as a historic centre of Hasidism, created and led by the tsadik of the Bobov dynasty.

It was also the home of Gen. Bolesław Wieniawa-Długoszowski who became "President of Poland for a day" in 1939. During the Second World War Bobowa became a "concentration village" where the Jews from the surrounding area were imprisoned by the Nazis. The General's brother Kazimierz was the mayor and was able to save at least one Jew. Almost all were finally killed. One of the few survivors, Professor Samuel P. Oliner of Humboldt State University, California, describes these events in his autobiography Restless Memories. He devoted his academic career to the study of altruism, having himself been rescued by a Polish peasant woman called Balwina.

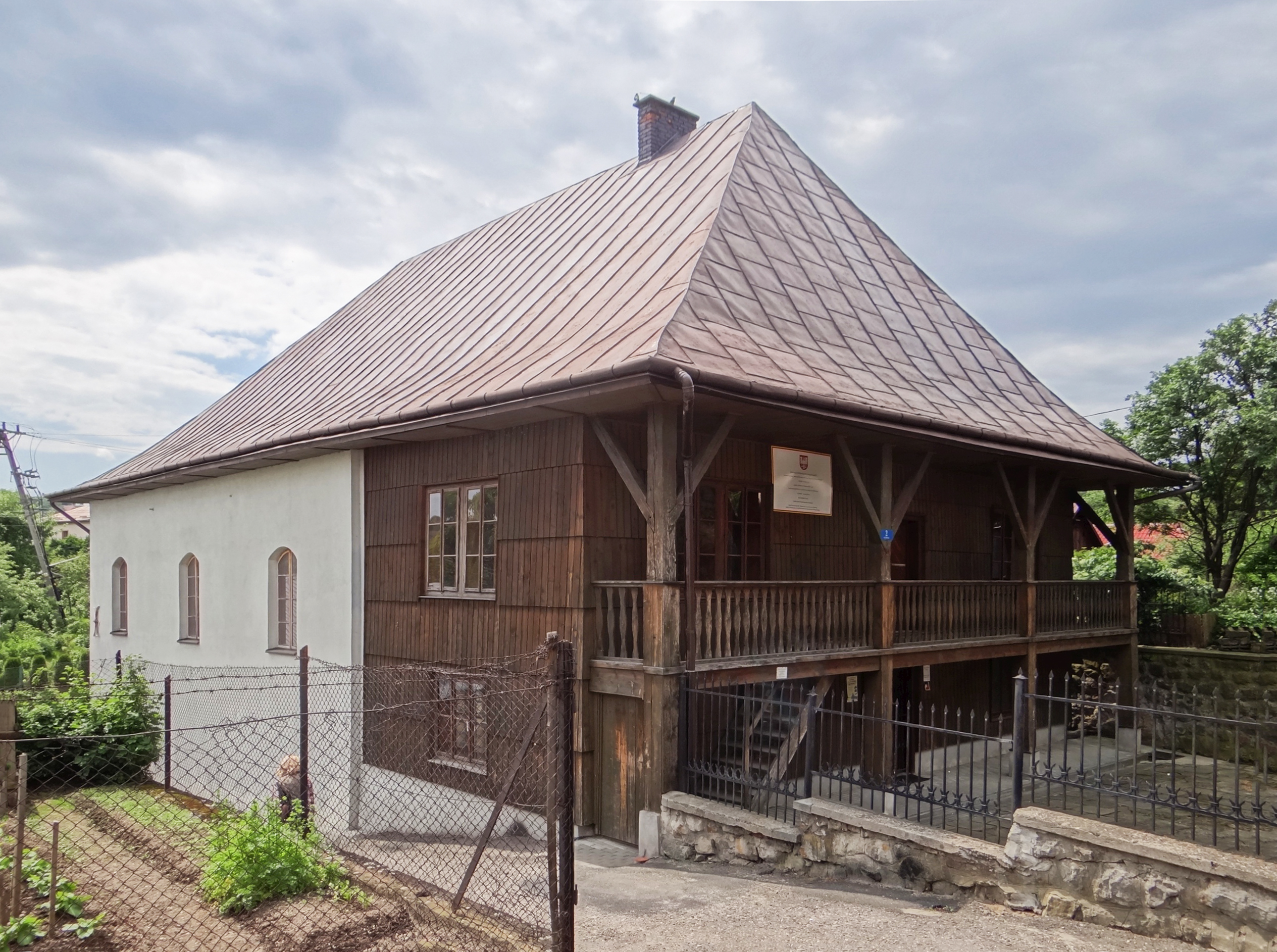
Bobowa synagogue

After the war Grand Rabbi Shlomo Halberstam (1907 – August 2, 2000) re-established the Bobov Hasidic dynasty in America. He was the son of Rabbi Ben Zion Halberstam (1874–1941) of Bobowa, who was murdered in the Holocaust. Initially based in the neighbourhood of Borough Park, Brooklyn, New York, it now has branches in the Williamsburg section of Brooklyn; Monsey, New York; Linden, New Jersey; Montreal; Toronto; Antwerp; London and Israel and is under the leadership of Rabbi Shlomo's son Rabbi Ben-Zion Aryeh Leibish Halberstam.

== Main sights ==
Among the tourist attractions of Bobowa is the All Saints Church (14th century) and the St. Sophia Church at the local cemetery, built in the late 15th century and surrounded by a picturesque wall built in the 17th century. In addition, there is a 17th-century szlachta manor house (commonly referred to as the castle by the locals). This was Bolesław Wieniawa-Długoszowski's house. In the 17th century this house belonged to early Polish followers of Unitarianism. They cremated their dead; the massive walls of the house contain cremation urns buried within them. There are also remnants of fortifications from the same period. The village's Jewish heritage is represented by a 1778 synagogue and a Jewish cemetery. Bobowa is also one of two (besides Koniaków) villages in Poland famous for traditional art of lace-making. Since 2000 it houses an annual Bobbin lace Festival.

== Notable people ==
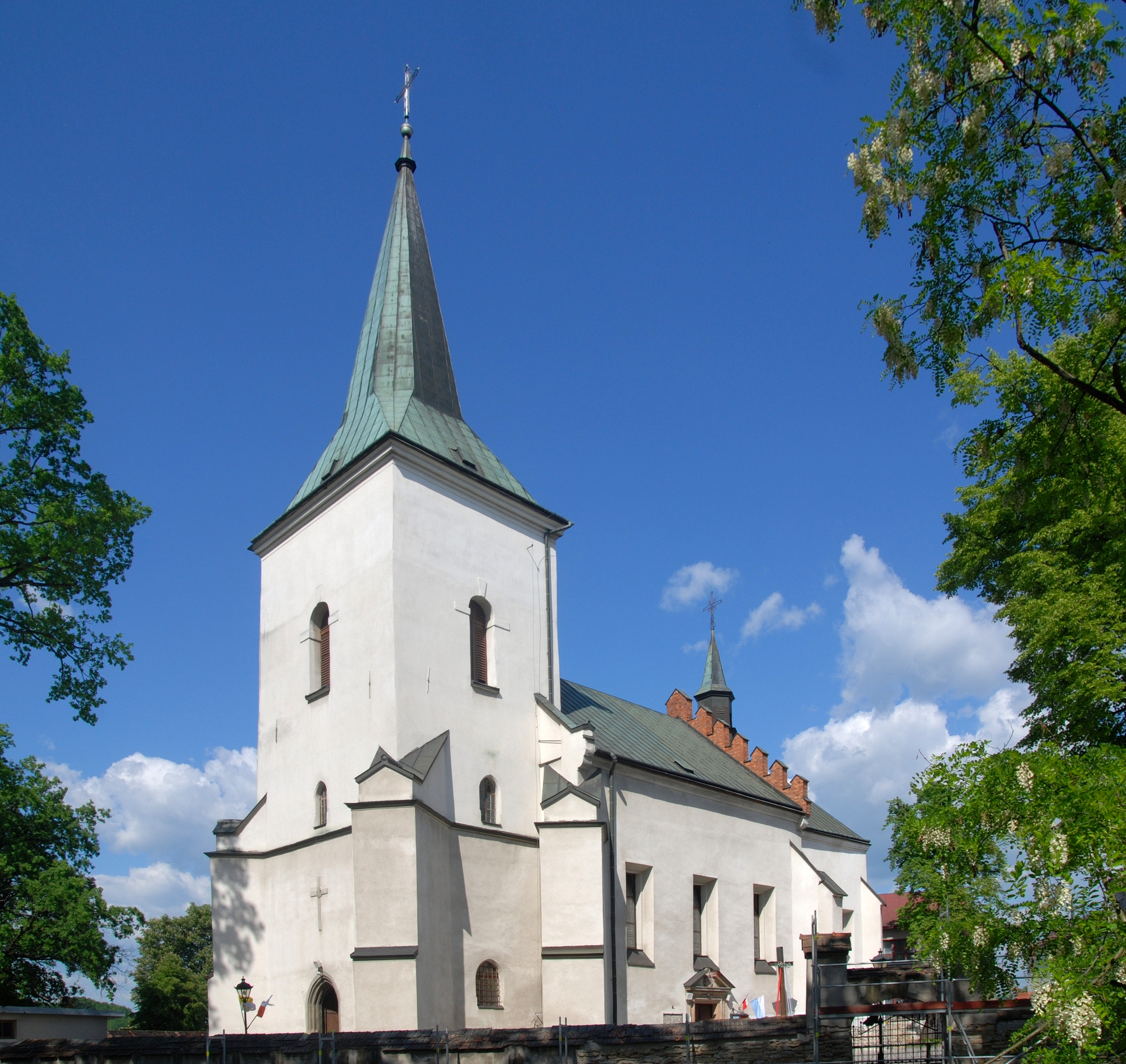
All Saints' Church in Bobowa

- Wojciech Bobowski
- Bolesław Wieniawa-Długoszowski
- Bronisława Wieniawa-Długoszowska

=== Rabbis of Bobowa ===
- Shlomo Halberstam (first Bobover rebbe)
- Ben Zion Halberstam
- Shlomo Halberstam (third Bobover rebbe)
- Naftali Halberstam

== See also ==
- Bobov (Hasidic dynasty)

== Bibliography ==
- Oliner S, Oliner P. The altruistic personality: Rescuers of Jews in Nazi Europe. New York: The Free Press; 1988.
- Oliner S. Restless Memories, Berkeley, California: Judah L. Magnes Museum; 1979.
- Gilbert M. The Boys; triumph over adversity. London: Weidenfeld & Nicolson; 1996.
- Szuflada Generała Wieniawa, edited by Elżbieta Grabska and Marek Pitasz, Państwowy Instytut Wydawniczy, Warsaw 1998
- Testimony held at Yad Vashem about Bobowa during the German occupation
