= Seret (Hasidic dynasty) =

Romanian Hasidic dynasty

Mendel Rubin of Seret (center), his son Moses Josef Rubin (right) and son-in-law Sholom Lamm (left).

Seret or Sereter Hasidim were a group of Hasidic Jews that existed in the town of Siret (Seret) and the surrounding area in Bukovina (currently split between Romania and Ukraine) during the late nineteenth century until World War II.

They were headed by their Rebbe ("Grand Rabbi") whose family name was Rubin and was a scion of the Hasidic dynasties of the Kosov, Ropshitz and Belz. In practice the Seret Hasidic group was a branch of the Kosov dynasty.

== History ==
Rabbi Chaim Hager, forerunner of the Vizhnitz Dynasty, died in 1854 in Kosov (at that time in Galicia, Poland) and left three sons, each of whom had followers (Hasidim).

The second oldest, rabbi Yosef Alter Hager, moved his permanent residence to Radovitz (Radauti) in 1856. He was married to Leah, the granddaughter of Reb Moshe Tzvi of Savran. In 1873 Reb he emigrated to the Land of Israel and left his only son, Rabbi Moshe Hager in his place in Radovitz.

His elder son-in-law rabbi Shmuel Schmelke Rubin (1840-1901), who was married to his daughter Chaya, led Hasidim in nearby Seret (Siret).

Rubin died in 1901 and was succeeded by his son rabbi Pinchos Menachem Mendel Rubin (1870-1941).

Rabbi Boruch Hager of the Vizhnitz Hasidic dynasty served as the official town rabbi in Seret from 1936–1941. After World War II he moved to Israel where he established a neighborhood called "Ramat Vizhnitz" in Haifa and became known as the Seret-Vizhnitzer rebbe, and was succeeded by his son Rabbi Eliezer Hager.

== Legacy ==
This dynasty ceased to exist during World War II. There are several Hasidic dynasties that descend from the Seret dynasty including the Muzhai, Sulitza, Sasregen, and Ropshitz dynasties, all currently based in New York.

== See also ==
- History of the Jews in Romania
