= Ben Zion Halberstam =

Polish rabbi (1874–1941)

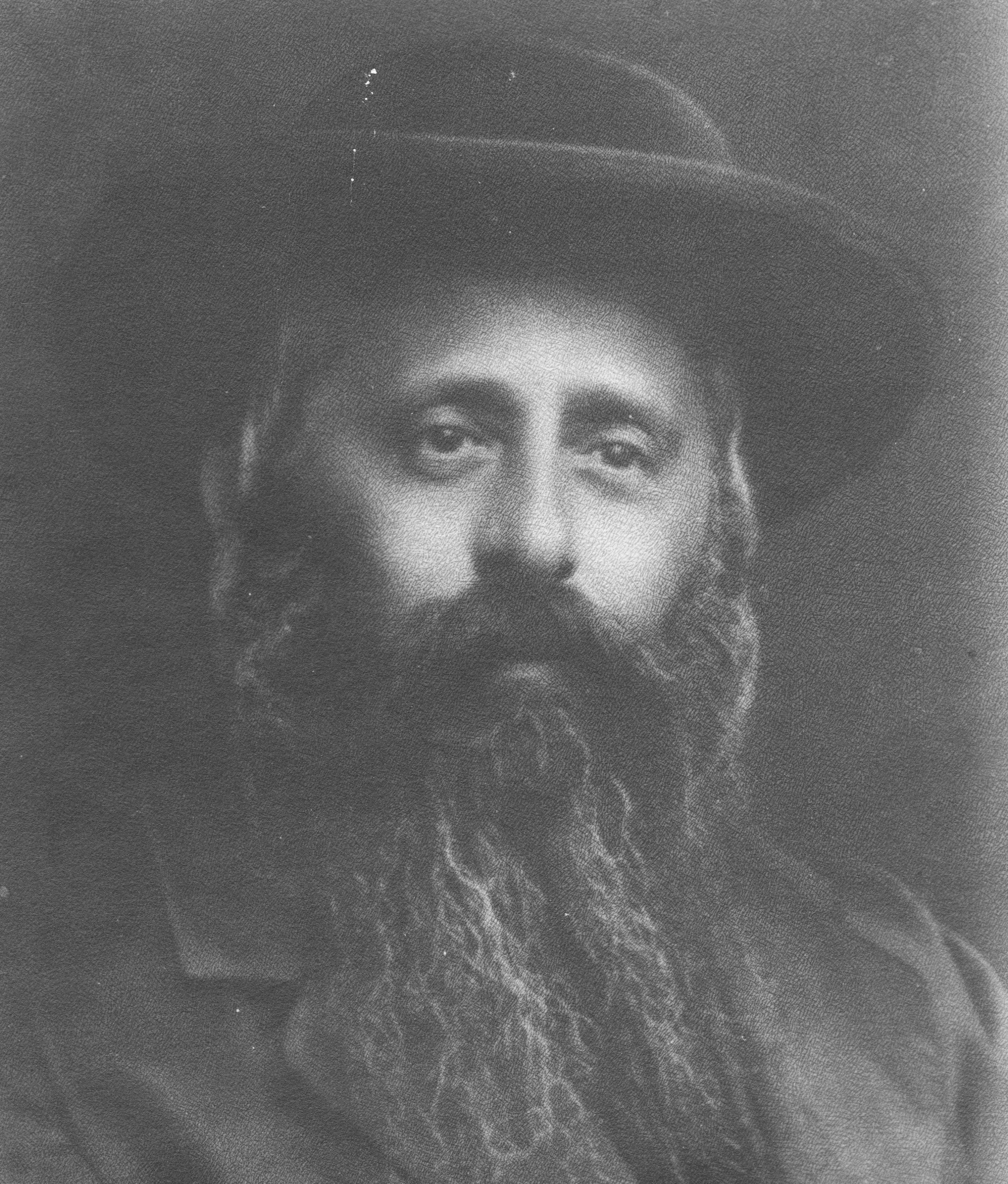
- Title: Second Bobover Rebbe

Personal life
- Born: Ben Zion Halberstam; 1874 Bukowsko
- Died: July 28, 1941 (aged 67) Lwów, German-occupied Poland
- Parent: Shlomo Halberstam (father)
- Dynasty: Bobov

Religious life
- Religion: Judaism

Jewish leader
- Predecessor: Shlomo Halberstam (father)
- Successor: Shlomo Halberstam (son)
- Began: 1905
- Ended: 1941
- Main work: Kedushas Tzion
- Dynasty: Bobov

Rabbi Ben Zion Halberstam (1874–1941) was the second Rebbe of Bobov. Known as the Baal Kedushas Tzion, he was murdered by the Nazis in 1941.

== Biography ==
Halberstam was born in Bukowsko in 1874. His father was Shlomo Halberstam (1847–1905), the first Rebbe of Bobov, and a scion of the Divrei Chaim of Sanz. Upon his father's death, Halberstam succeeded him as Rebbe. He authored a commentary on the Torah called Kedushas Tzion.

Lwów, where Halberstam then lived, fell under Nazi control in July 1941. For about a month, Halberstam hid in a room the door to which was secretly blocked by a large bookcase. A friend convinced him to come out of hiding, on the theory that the Germans were harsher to people who were found hiding. The friend also argued that the Germans would honor Halberstam’s official papers that declared he was a foreign resident. On Friday, July 25, he left his place of hiding and established himself openly in a separate room in the apartment. Early that same morning, groups of peasants from nearby villages began to flow into Lwów. They assembled on the premises of police stations; setting out from there to the streets accompanied by Ukrainian policemen, they assaulted any Jew whom they encountered with clubs, knives and axes. Groups of Jews were taken to the Jewish cemetery and murdered brutally. A roundup of Jews from their homes, coupled with looting, began in the afternoon. The proportion of Jewish intellectuals was high. Ukrainian police circulated in groups of five and consulted prepared lists. The pogrom was known as the "Petliura Days" in commemoration of Symon Petliura. For three days, Ukrainian mobs went on a rampage through the Jewish districts of Lwów. They took groups of Jews to the Jewish cemetery and the Lunecki prison and shot them.

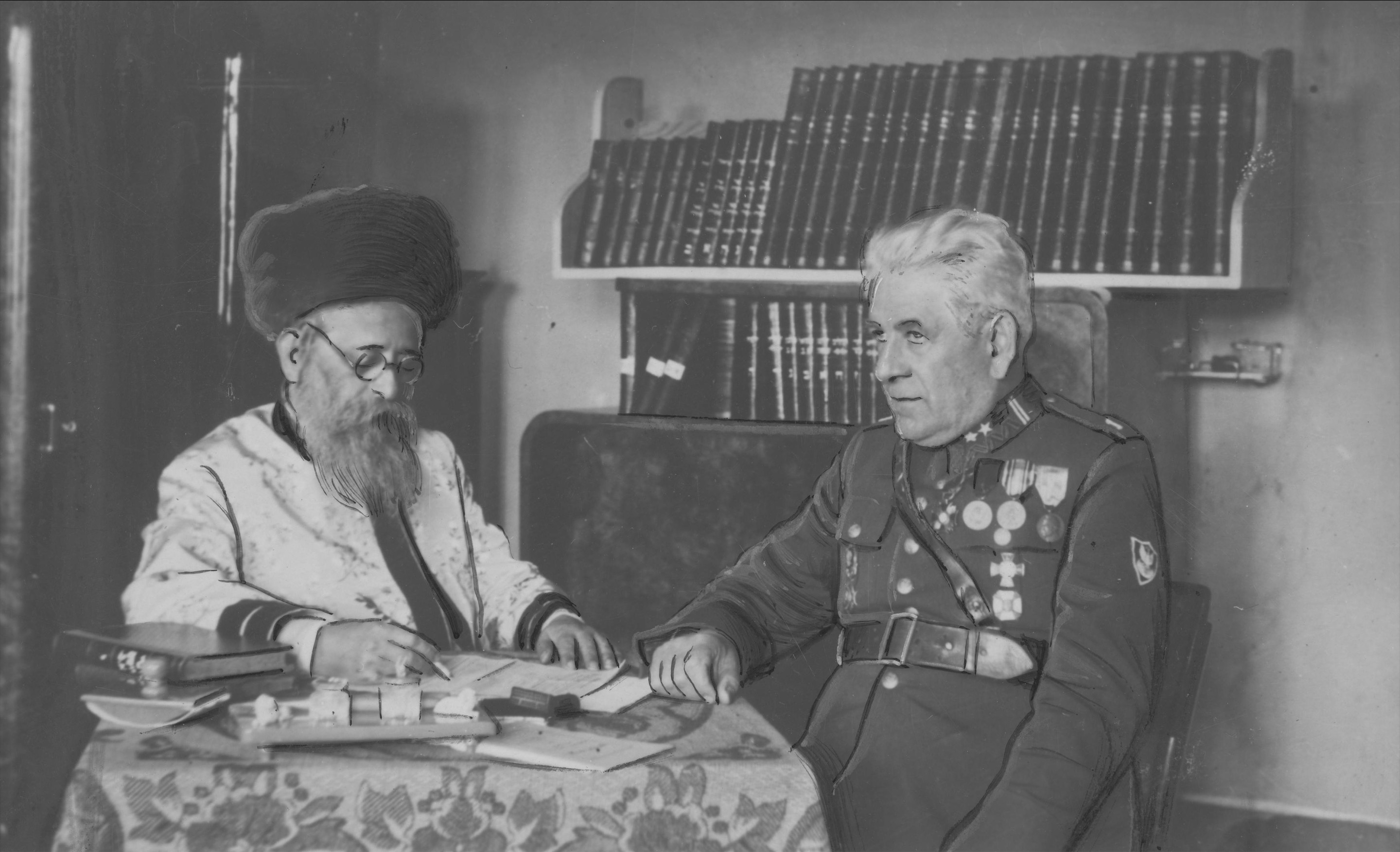
Halberstam photographed in 1939 with Kazimierz Wieniawa-Długoszowski promoting a Polish government war loan. Kazimierz—the squire of Bobowa—was the brother of General Bolesław Wieniawa-Długoszowski, whose wife Bronisława Wieniawa-Długoszowska was of Jewish origin.

At about 6 pm, the door opened suddenly and a young Ukrainian entered together with the building's gentile superintendent. The youth carried a red whip with the insignia of the Symon Petliura bands and ordered Halberstam to accompany him. His youngest son, Moshe Aaron, pleaded to come along to help his father, and was eventually allowed too. They were joined on the street corner by other distinguished prisoners from other areas in the city. Soldiers stood guard to prevent escape. When the number of captives reached a hundred, the guards arranged them in a row, three abreast, and ordered them to march. Halberstam was too weak to keep up with the rapid pace and moved to the back. The guards beat him with their batons and demanded that he hurry up. An eyewitness writes that

he saw from his window how the Rebbe, dressed in his Sabbath clothing was attacked by the soldiers. The cruel Ukrainians beat him on his head with their rifle-butts and his yarmulke fell to the ground. From time to time the Rebbe bent over and stooped to pick it up, and they beat him even more.

The next day there was another action, which resulted in the arrests of three of Halberstam's sons-in-law: Yecheskel Halberstam (son of Yeshayale Tchechoiver), Moshe Stempel, and Shlome Rubin. On Monday, July 28, the captives were shot in the Yanover forest behind the city, including Halberstam, his son, and twenty thousand other Jews.

Halberstam was succeeded by his son Shlomo Halberstam (1907–2000), who rebuilt Bobov in the United States.

== Rebbes of Bobov ==
1. Shlomo Halberstam (1847–1905) grandson of the Sanzer Rebbe, Chaim Halberstam
2. Ben Zion Halberstam (1874–1941)
3. Shlomo Halberstam (1907–2000)
4. Naftali Halberstam (1931–2005)
5. Benzion Aryeh Leibish Halberstam, younger son of Shlomo Halberstam

- Mordechai Dovid Unger, son-in-law of Naftali Halberstam, presently referred to as the Rebbe of Bobov-45. The suffix, which was added to differentiate Unger's sect from the group led by Benzion Arye Leibish Halberstam, is a tribute to 45th street in Borough Park, Brooklyn, the location of the sect's community center at the time.

Religious titles
Preceded by Shlomo Halberstam	Rebbe of Bobov; 1905–1941	Succeeded by Shlomo Halberstam
