= Dombrov (Hasidic dynasty) =

Polish Hasidic dynasty

Dombrov is a Hasidic dynasty founded by Rebbe Mordechai Dovid Unger (c. 1770–1846). Dombrov is the Yiddish name of Dąbrowa Tarnowska, a town in present-day Poland.

== Lineage ==
Unger was the son of Tsvi Hersh, a disciple of Elimelech of Lizhensk and Avrohom Yehosua Heshel of Apt. He studied under the Kozhnitzer Magid.

=== Rebbes of the Unger family ===
- Mordechai Dovid Unger of Dombrov
  - Yosef of Dombrov, son of Morechai Dovid
    - Yisroel Elimelech Unger of Zhabno, son of Yosef
      - Mordechai David Unger of Tsanz, son of Yisroel Elimelech
        - Ben Zion Unger of Tsanz, son of Mordechai Davi, son-in-law of Rabbi Sholom Reinman of the Narol hasidic dynasty
          - Yaakov Yitzchak Unger, Dombrover rebbe in America—son of Ben Zion
            - Ben Zion Unger, present Dombrover Rebbe of Boro Park
            - Mordechai David Unger of Bobov-45

Another section of the family

  - Menachem Mendel Unger of Dombrov-Stobnitz, son of Mordechai Dovid of Dombrov
    - Yisroel of Dombrov-Stobnitz, son of Menachem Mendel
      - Meir Mordechai Dovid of Dombrov-Stobnitz, son of Yisroel
        - Yerachmiel of Dombrov-Stobnitz, son of Meir Mordechai and son-in-law of Chaim Yaakov, Safrin rebb of Komarno
          - Yisroel Unger of Dombrov-Stobnitz, son of Yerachmiel (in Boro Park)

=== Rebbes of the Rubin Family ===
    - Meir Rubin of Glogov-Dombrova, son-in-law of Yosef of Dombrova
      - Chaim Yechiel Rubin of Dombrova, son of Meir
        - Yissachar Berish Rubin of Dombrova. Rebbe in Berlin, and later in Washington Heights, New York.
          - Esriel Rubin of Dombrova, son in law of Yisachar Ber Shapiro of the Nadvorna dynasty
            - Naftoli Tzvi Rubin of Dombrova-Monsey, son of Esriel

The current Satmar Rebbes are descendants of the Dombrova dynasty. On their father's grave, it says he is a descendant of Rav Mordechai Dovid of Dombrova.

=== Ostrov-Kalushin ===
  - Grand Rabbi of Kaloshin R' Avraham Elchanan Unger, son of Rabbi Mordechai Dovid of Dombrov and son-in-law of Rabbi Klonimus Kalman Szternfeld (Horowitz) of Paritzk.
    - Grand Rabbi Yaakov Yitzhak Unger of Kalushin, son of R' Avraham Elchanan
      - Grand Rabbi of Ostrov-Kalushin Rabbi Naftali Aryeh Spiegel, son-in-law of R' Yaakov Yitzchok
        - Grand Rabbi Pinchas Eliyahu Spiegel of Ostrov-Kalushin, son of Naftali Aryeh
          - Grand Rabbi Moshe Spiegel of Ostrov-Kalushin (Long Beach), son of Pinchas Eliyahu
          - Grand Rabbi Yaakov Yitzchok Spiegel of Ostrov-Kalushin (Boro Park), son of Pinchas Eliyahu
          - Grand Rabbi Avrohom Elchonon Spiegel (Chuni) of Ostrov-Kalushin (Boro Park), son of Pinchas Eliyahu
          - Grand Rabbi Dovid Spiegel of Ostrov-Kalushin (Cedarhurst), son of Pinchas Eliyahu
        - Grand Rabbi Elchonon Yochanon Spiegel of Ostrov-Kalushin, son of Naftali Aryeh
        - Grand Rabbi Moshe Menachem Spiegel of Ostrov-Kalushin, son of Naftali Aryeh

== Gallery ==
Rebbe Chaim Yechiel of Dombrova, son of Grand Rebbe Meir of Glogov

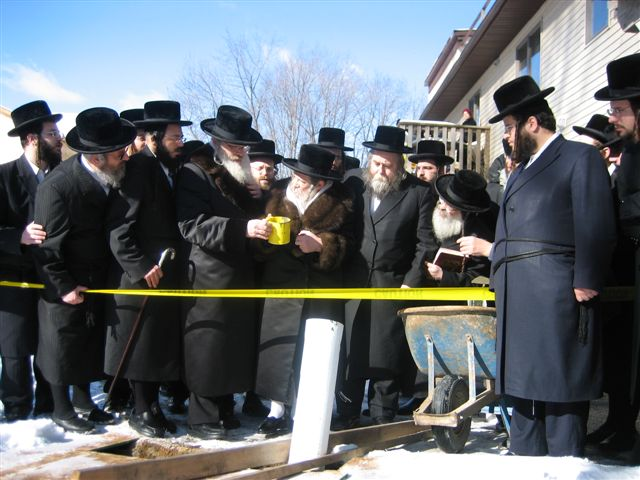
Dombrover Rebbe of Monsey with the Nadvorna Rebbe of Bnei Brak

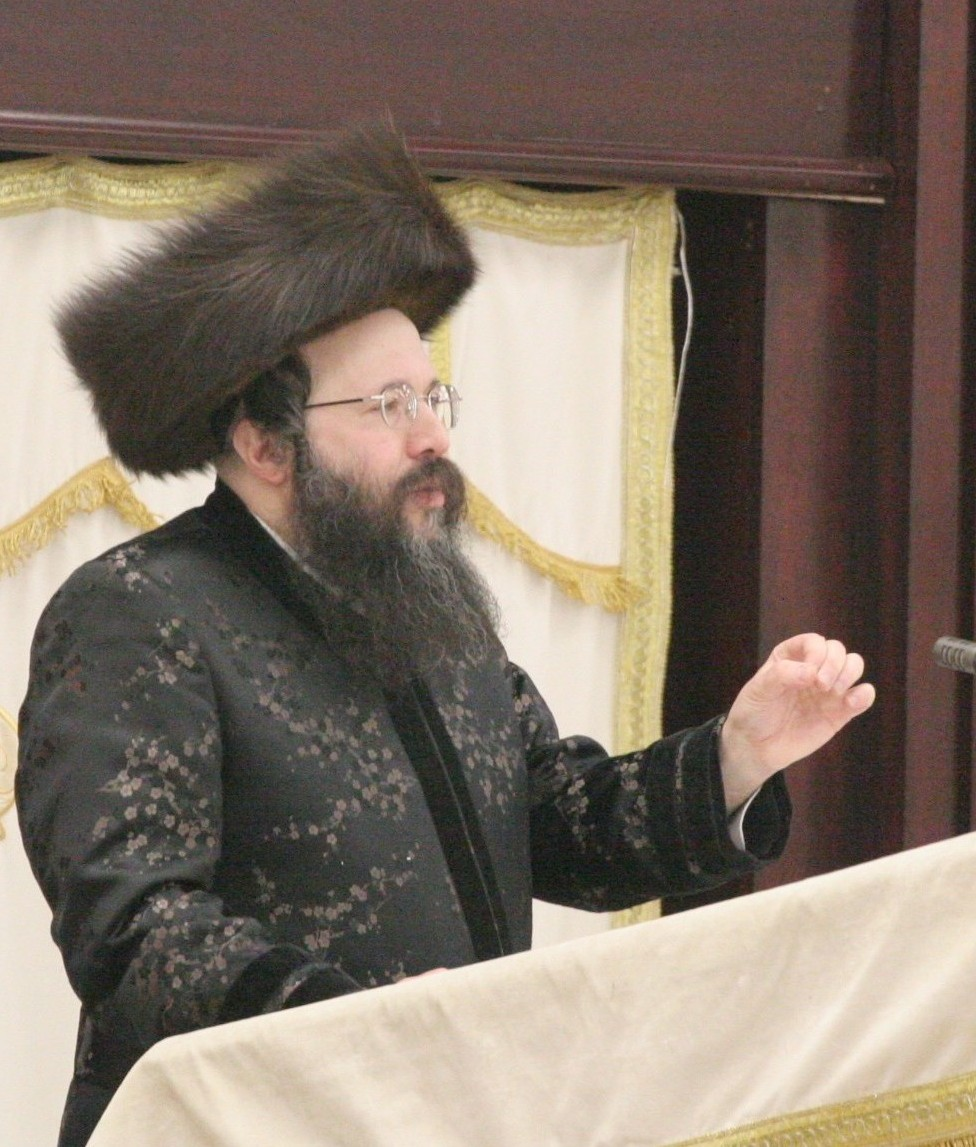
Grand Rabbi Mordechai Dovid Unger, a scion of the Dombrov dynasty

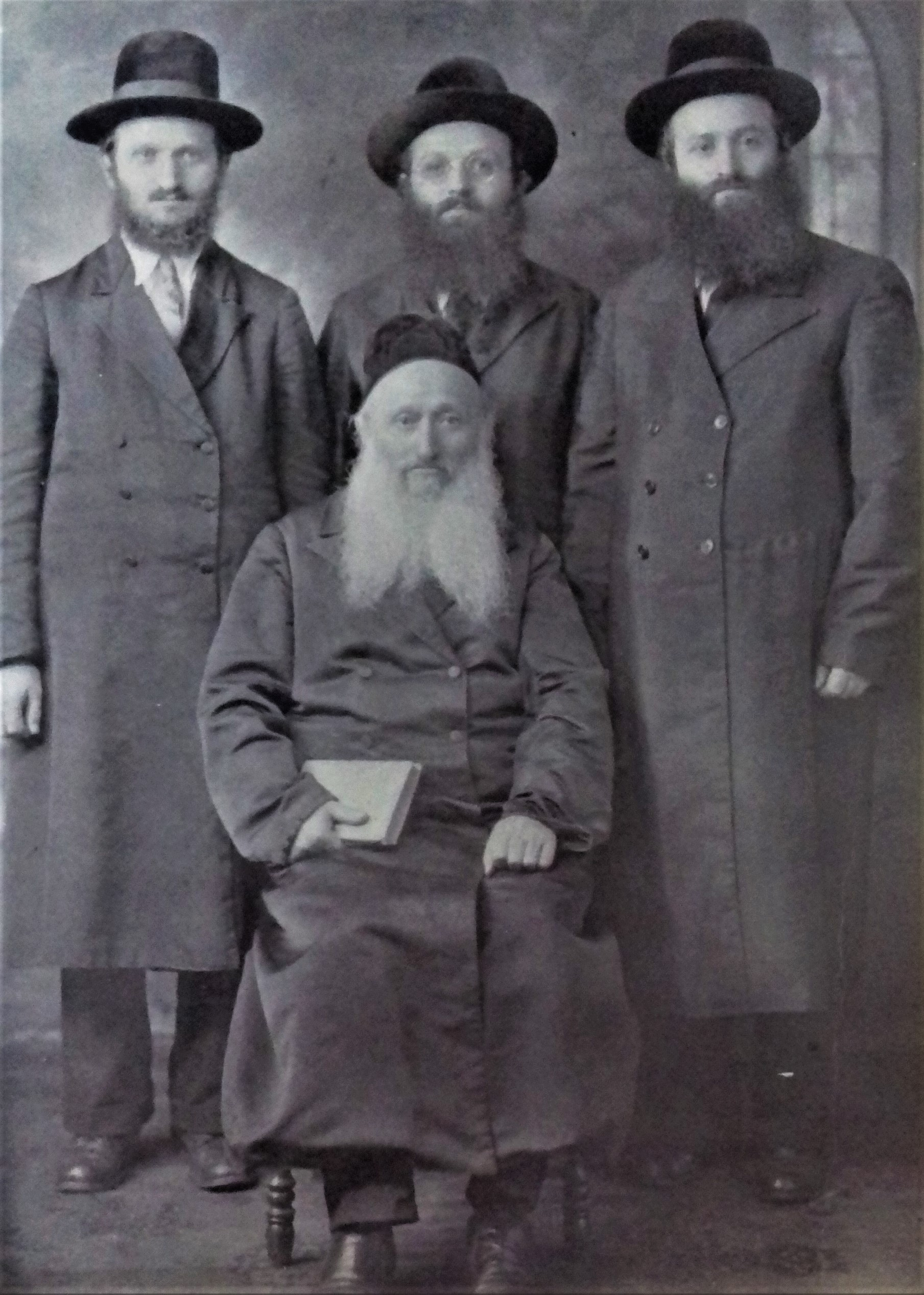
Seated: Grand Rabbi Naftali Aryeh Spiegel of Ostrov-Kalushin. Back (l-r) Rabbis Elchonon Yochanan, Pinchas Eliyahu, and Moshe Menachem Spiegel.
