= Shlomo Halberstam (third Bobover rebbe) =

American rabbi (1907–2000)

- Title: Third Bobover Rebbe

Personal life
- Born: 1908 Poland
- Died: August 2, 2000 (aged 92)
- Buried: Floral Park Cemetery, Deans, New Jersey
- Parent: Ben Zion Halberstam (father)
- Dynasty: Bobov

Religious life
- Religion: Judaism

Jewish leader
- Predecessor: Ben Zion Halberstam
- Successor: Naftali Halberstam
- Main work: Divrei Shlomo
- Dynasty: Bobov

Rabbi Shlomo Halberstam (1908 — August 2, 2000) (Hebrew: רבי שלמה הלברשטאם), was the third Rebbe of Bobov. He re-established the Bobov Hasidic dynasty in the United States after World War II.

== Early life ==
Shlomo Halberstam was born in Poland. He was the eldest son of Ben Zion Halberstam (1874–1941), the second Rebbe of Bobov. His father was murdered by the Nazis and their Ukrainian collaborators during the Holocaust.

== Career ==
After the war, Halberstam arrived in the United States. Although starting off with only a small yeshiva for sixteen boys on the West Side of Manhattan, Halberstam would go on to rebuild the Bobov institutions in the US, Israel and London after their decimation in the Holocaust.

== Personal life and death ==
Having lost his first wife and most of their children during the Holocaust, Halberstam remarried. His son from his second marriage was Benzion Aryeh Leibish Halberstam. Shlomo Halberstam died in the summer of 2000, and was succeeded by his eldest son Naftali Halberstam (1931–2005).

== Legacy ==
A selection of Halberstam's teachings were recorded in the book Kerem Shlome and many more books.

== Rebbes of Bobov ==
1. Shlomo Halberstam (1847–1905) grandson of the Sanzer Rebbe, Chaim Halberstam
2. Ben Zion Halberstam (1874–1941)
3. Shlomo Halberstam (1907–2000)
4. Naftali Halberstam (1931–2005) older son of Shlomo Halberstam
5. Benzion Aryeh Leibish Halberstam, younger son of Shlomo Halberstam

- Mordechai Dovid Unger, son-in-law of Naftali Halberstam, presently referred to as the Rebbe of Bobov-45. The suffix, which was added to differentiate Unger's sect from the group led by Benzion Arye Leibish Halberstam, is a tribute to 45th street in Borough Park, Brooklyn, the location of the sect's community center at the time.

== See also ==
- Chaim Halberstam
- Bobowa (in Poland)

Religious titles
Preceded by Rabbi Ben Zion Halberstam	Rebbe of Bobov; 1941–2000	Succeeded by Naftali Halberstam
