= Bobov (Hasidic dynasty) =

Polish Hasidic dynasty

Bobov Hasidic Dynasty
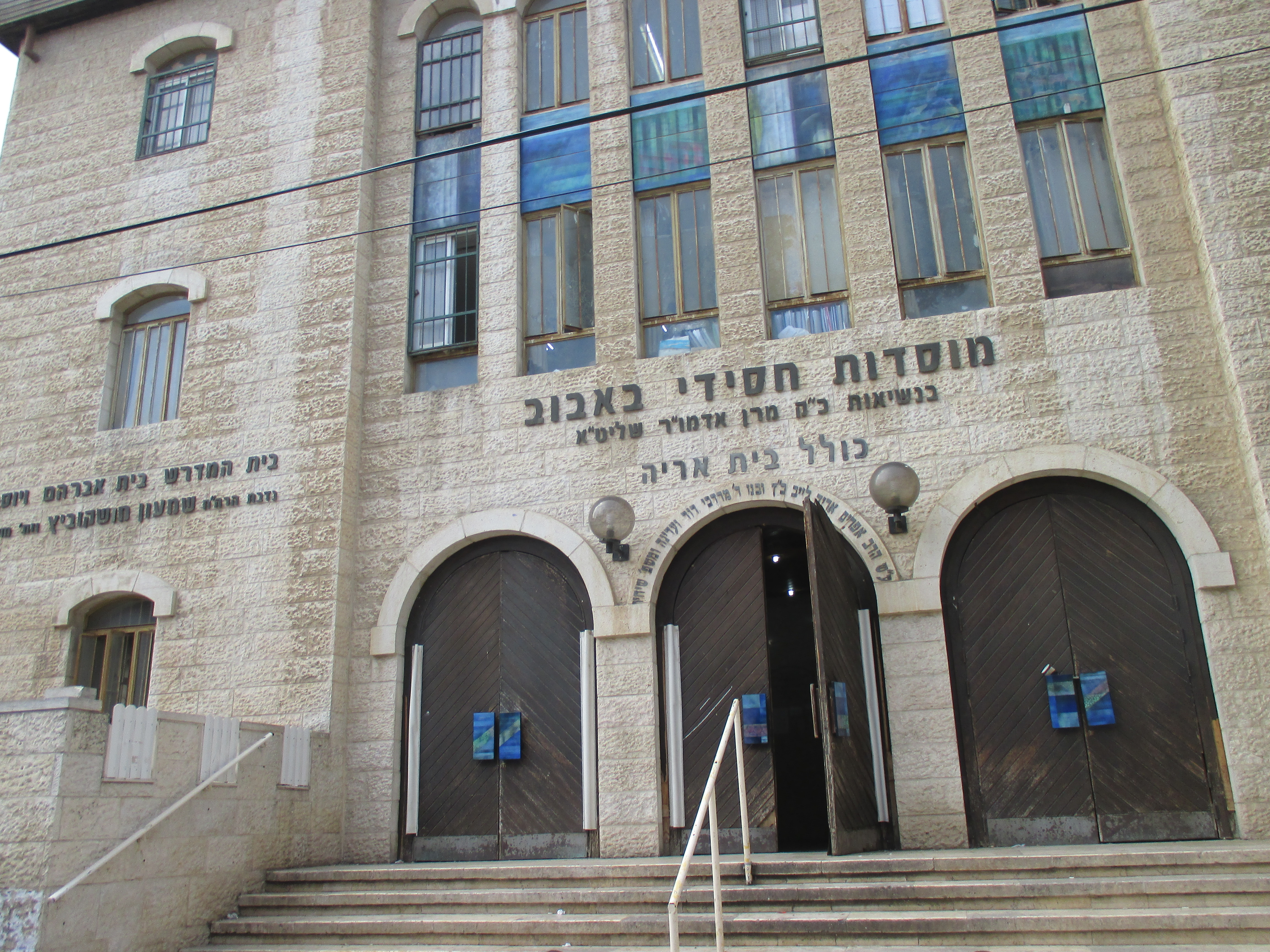
- Bobov Institutions in Jerusalem

Founder
- Rabbi Shlomo Halberstam

Regions with significant populations
- Israel, United States, Western Europe

Religions
- Hasidic Judaism

Bobov, or Bobover Hasidism (Hebrew: חסידות באבוב; Yiddish: בּאָבּאָװ), is a Hasidic quietist community within Haredi Judaism that originated in Bobowa, Galicia, in southern Poland, and is now headquartered in the neighborhood of Borough Park, in Brooklyn, New York.

Bobov developed into a leading Hasidic dynasty through the leadership of Shlomo Halberstam, a Holocaust survivor. After the death of his son Naftali, a succession crisis ensued, leading to the ascension of Naftali's half-brother, Benzion Aryeh Leibish Halberstam as Grand Rebbe, and his son-in-law, Mordechai Dovid Unger, as leader of Bobov-45, a breakaway faction.

Bobov communities are found in the Williamsburg section of Brooklyn; in Monsey, New York; Los Angeles; Lakewood, New Jersey; Linden, New Jersey; Montreal; Toronto; Antwerp; and London. In Israel, Bobov has large branches in Jerusalem, Bnei Brak, Ashdod, Elad, Beitar Illit, and an enclave, "Kiryas Bobov", in Bat Yam.

== Outline of Bobov's Hasidic rabbinical lineage ==
Grand Rabbi; Yisroel ben Eliezer; Baal Shem Tov (1698–1760) founder of Hasidism	Grand Rabbi; Dov Ber (1710–1772) the Maggid of Mezritch	Grand Rabbi; Elimelech of Lizhensk (1717–1786) author of Noam Elimelech	Grand Rabbi; Naftali Tzvi Horowitz of Ropshitz (1760–1827) author of Zera Kodesh	Grand Rabbi; Chaim Halberstam of Sanz (1793–1876) author of Divrei Chaim	Rabbi Myer Noson Halberstam (1827–1855)
3. Grand Rabbi; Shlomo Halberstam; (1907–2000); Third Bobover Rebbe author of Divrei Shlomo	4. Grand Rabbi; Hrh"k R Naftali Tzvi Halberstam; (1931–2005); Fourth Bobover Rebbe	Female Halberstam
1. Grand Rabbi; Shlomo Halberstam; (1847–1905); First Bobover Rebbe author of Ateres Shlomo eldest grandson of the Divrei Chaim	2. Grand Rabbi; Ben Zion Halberstam; (1874–1941); Second Bobover Rebbe author of Kedushas Tzion	5. Grand Rabbi; Ben Zion Aryeh Leibish Halberstam; (b. 1955); Fifth Bobover Rebbe	Grand Rabbi; Rabbi Mordechai Dovid Unger Shlita (b. 1954); First Bobov-45 Rebbe	Rabbi Yosef Unger; Ruv of Beth Midrash Apirion Shel Shlome and R"Y of Yeshiva Ketane of Bobov 45	Rabbi Shulim Unger bobov-45 ruv london
Female Halberstam	Female Halberstam	Female Rubin
Rabbi Chaim Yaakov Tauber; Bobov Dayan	Rabbi Yehoshua Rubin (born 1952); Bobov-45 Ruv	Rabbi Zvi Hirsh Rabinovich present Ruv of Bobov-45 in Monsey
Female Halberstam	Female Rubin
Teacher → Student
Rabbi Yonasan Binyamin Goldberger; First Rebbe of Bikofsk & Rosh Hakolel of Bobov	Rabbi Shimon Goldberger; Second and Current Rebbe of Bikofsk	Rabbi Meyer Yosef Eichenstein; Present Rosh Hakolel of Bobov-45
Father → Son
Female Halberstam
Husband ↔ Wife
Rabbi Ben Zion Blum; Bobover Dayan of London
Female Halberstam
Rabbi Yaakov Yisroel Meisles; Bobover Ruv of Kiryath Bobov in Bat Yam
Female Halberstam
Rabbi Boruch Avraham Horowitz present Rosh Yeshiva of Mesivta Eitz Chaim of Bobov
Rabbi Baruch Dovid Halberstam; Sorvosher Ruv	Rabbi Ben Zion Dov Halberstam
Rabbi Chaim Yehoshua Halberstam
Rabbi Yaakov Yosef Halberstam; Ruv of Beis Chaim Yehoshua	Rabbi Chaim Yehoshua Halberstam; Rabbi of Satmar in Monsey
Rabbi Yechiel Halberstam; Pokshivnitzer Rebbe of Monsey, NY
Rabbi Yechezkel Dovid Halberstam; Pokshivnitzer Rebbe	Rabbi Chaim Halberstam; Pokshivnitzer Rebbe of Flatbush
Rabbi Ben Zion Avraham Halberstam; Pokshivnitzer Rebbe of Flatbush
Rabbi Shloime Halberstam; Pokshivnitzer Rebbe of Lakewood, New Jersey

== History ==
=== First Rebbe of Bobov, Shlomo Halberstam (1847–1905) ===
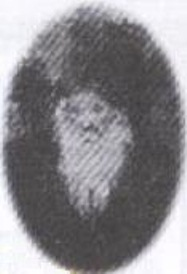
Rabbi Shlomo Halberstam, the first Bobover Rebbe

Bobov originated with Shlomo Halberstam, who was the grandson of Grand Rabbi Chaim Halberstam of Sanz, in the Galician village of Bobowa.

While most of the early yeshivas (Talmudic academies) originated in Lithuania, the 19th century saw the opening of similar institutions in Poland. The first yeshiva in Poland was established by the first Bobover Rebbe in 1881 in Vishnitsa, where he was rabbi at the time, and it later moved with him to Bobov.

=== Second Bobover Rebbe, Ben Zion Halberstam (1874 – 1941) ===
His work was continued by his son, Grand Rabbi Ben Zion Halberstam, author of Kedushas Tzion. The Bobov Yeshiva was originally situated only in the town of Bobov itself. However, under his guidance, the court grew in numbers, with Hasidic youth flocking to Bobov. Subsequently, as many as sixty branches of the yeshiva under the name Etz Chaim were established throughout Galicia.

During World War II, the Bobov Hasidic movement was destroyed. The second Rebbe himself was murdered in the Holocaust, together with family members and thousands of his followers.

=== Third Bobover Rebbe, Shlomo Halberstam (1908 – 2000) ===
Barely 300 Hasidim survived, and the Rebbe's son, Shlomo Halberstam, took it upon himself to rebuild Bobov. He first settled in the West Side of Manhattan, later moving to the Bedford-Stuyvesant neighborhood of Brooklyn. The yeshiva, which was originally located at 184 Brooklyn Avenue, later moved to the nearby Borough Park neighborhood. Shlomo Halberstam was known for his wisdom, his caring for others, and his steadfastness in not taking sides in disputes.

Over the more than fifty years that Shlomo Halberstam was Rebbe of Bobov, he founded and built a worldwide network of synagogues, Hasidic schools for boys and girls, mesivtas (high schools), and post-high school houses of learning. Besides schools, a summer camp for boys was founded in 1957 in Ferndale, New York, and a girls' camp, Camp Gila, was founded a few years later. At the time of his death in August 2000, he was mourned by more followers than his father had in pre-war Poland. At his funeral, it was publicly announced that his eldest son, Naftali, would succeed him as Rebbe, and his younger brother, Ben Zion, would serve as Rav Hatzair (assistant rabbi).

=== Fourth Bobover Rebbe, Naftali Halberstam (1931 – 2005) ===
With Shlomo Halberstam's death, his older son, Naftali Zvi Halberstam, succeeded him. Naftali Zvi died on March 23, 2005 (12th of Adar II, 5765), at age 74, leaving a wife, two daughters, and two sons-in-law: Yehoshua Rubin, Rav of Bobov-45; and Mordechai Dovid Unger, Rebbe of Bobov-45.

=== Fifth and current Rebbe of Bobov, Ben Zion Halberstam (1955 –) ===
After Naftali Tzvi Halberstam died in 2005, a dispute arose among Bobover Hasidim as to who should attain the dynasty leadership. Some began to follow Ben Zion Aryeh Leibish Halberstam, the younger half-brother of the late Rebbe, while others followed his son-in-law Unger, who was one year older. Unger had already ensconced himself firmly within the community by then, and could not challenge his own father's leadership of Dombrov, which anyway was not as substantial a dynasty. The matter of succession was brought before a beth din (religious court) in 2007, which ruled that Halberstam would be declared the fifth Rebbe of Bobov (אדמו"ר מבאבוב) with its headquarters on 48th Street in Borough Park, while Unger would be Rebbe of Bobov-45 (אדמו"ר מבאבוב-45), located on 45th Street. While the former community retained the rights to the name "Bobov", Unger's faction was permitted to use the name, provided that the qualifier be added to it.

== Bobov-45 ==
An offshoot of the Bobov dynasty, Bobov-45 is headquartered in Borough Park. It has branches in Williamsburg and Monsey, New York; Lakewood, New Jersey; Los Angeles; Montreal; London; Manchester; Antwerp; and an enclave "Yishuv of Chasidei Bobov-45" in Union, New Jersey. In Israel, Bobov-45 has branches in Jerusalem, Bnei Brak, Beit Shemesh, Ashdod, Elad, and Beitar Illit.

=== History of Bobov-45 ===
The third Bobover Rebbe, Shlomo Halberstam, rebuilt the Bobov Hasidic dynasty in the United States after losing his wife and most of his children in the Holocaust. His son Naftali, who survived, became the fourth Rebbe upon his father's death. He had no sons but left two daughters, one of whom married Yehoshua Rubin, and the other Mordechai Dovid Unger. In 2005, after Naftali's death, a group of Bobover Hasidim loyal to his son-in-law, Mordechai Dovid Unger, preferred that he take over as Rebbe of Bobov.

The dispute was taken to a beth din (arbitration panel), which ruled that Halberstam held the rights to the name "Bobov" and to all Bobov institutions. Unger was allowed to use the name Bobov, provided that a qualifier be added. The suffix "-45" was henceforth adopted in tribute to the street on which the community center of the sect was located at the time. In addition, the beth din ordered Bobov to pay $6,200,000 to Bobov-45's Rebbe and dayan in twenty-five quarterly installments, as an allotment of their faction's share of the inheritance of the Bobov enterprise's assets; it is unknown what the value of the assets was at the time.

=== First and current Grand rabbi of Bobov-45 Mordechai Dovid Unger (1954 –) ===
Unger, the first Grand Rabbi of Bobov-45, is the younger son-in-law of the fourth Bobover Rebbe, Naftali Halberstam. Unger has been active in the wider Jewish community. Yehoshua Rubin, the older son-in-law of Halberstam, is the current dayan and rabbinical leader of the sect.

=== Institutions ===
Community institutions, such as a synagogue, have been built within Bobov-45. Other Bobov infrastructure includes a Yeshiva, beth midrash (study hall), cheder (elementary school), yeshiva ketana (secondary school), mesivta, girls school, day camp, and wedding halls.

== Notable people ==
- Shlomo Halberstam (first Bobover Rebbe)
- Ben Zion Halberstam
- Shlomo Halberstam (third Bobover rebbe)
- Naftali Halberstam
- Ben Zion Aryeh Leibish Halberstam
- Mordechai Dovid Unger
- Simcha Eichenstein
- Benzion Miller

== See also ==
- Hasidic Judaism in Poland

== Sources ==
- Heilman, Samuel C. (December 2013). "What's in a Name? The Dilemma of Title and Geography for Contemporary Hasidism". Jewish History. 27 (2–4): 221–240. doi:10.1007/s10835-013-9187-5. S2CID 254602685. ProQuest 1460841654.
