= List of Galician (Eastern Europe) Jews =

List of Galicia (Eastern Europe) Jews – Jews born in Galicia (Eastern Europe) or identifying themselves as Galitzianer. Those born after the Congress of Vienna would be considered subjects of the Austrian empire and those after the foundation of the dual monarchy in 1867 and before the end of World War I in 1918, would have been Austro-Hungarian citizens.

== Religious figures ==
- Eliezer Adler, founder of the Jewish Community in Gateshead, England
- Yosef Babad
- Josef Samuel Bloch
- Zvi Hirsch Chajes
- Elimelech of Lizhensk
- Jacob Frank, Jewish messianic claimant who combined Judaism and Christianity
- Shlomo Halberstam, first Rebbe of Bobov
- Ben Zion Halberstam, second Rebbe of Bobov
- Chaim Halberstam of Sanz
- Naftali Halberstam, fourth Rebbe of Bobov
- Arthur Hertzberg
- Tzvi Hirsh of Zidichov
- Nachman Krochmal
- Hirschel Levin, Chief Rabbi at London and Berlin
- Roza Pomerantz-Meltzer (1861–1934), writer, Zionist, women's rights activist
- Samuel Judah Löb Rapoport (Shir)
- Shalom Rokeach, first Rebbe of Belz (Hasidic dynasty)
- Yehoshua Rokeach, second Rebbe of Belz
- Yissachar Dov Rokeach, third Rebbe of Belz
- Aharon Rokeach, fourth Rebbe of Belz
- Malka Rokeach, first rebbetzin of Belz
- Mordechai Rokeach, Rav of Bilgoray
- Sholom Mordechai Schwadron
- Meir Shapiro, Hasidic rabbi and rosh yeshiva
- Dov Berish Weidenfeld
- Mendel Weinbach (1933–2012), rosh yeshiva, Yeshivas Ohr Somayach
- Israel Zolli, Chief Rabbi of Rome, converted to Christianity

== Political figures ==
- Muhammad Asad, Jewish religious writer who converted to Islam, Pakistani diplomat
- Isaac Deutscher, Polish-British political activist and historian
- Abba Hushi, Israeli mayor of Haifa
- Julian Klaczko, Polish-Austrian politician
- František Kriegel, Czechoslovak politician
- Walter Krivitsky, Soviet spy
- Manfred Lachs, Polish diplomat and jurist
- Pinhas Lavon, Israeli politician
- Herman Lieberman, Polish socialist politician
- Karl Radek, Bolshevik politician
- Jakob Rosenfeld, Chinese general
- Adam Daniel Rotfeld, Polish foreign affairs minister
- Dov Sadan, Israeli academic and politician
- Eliot Spitzer, former Governor of New York, Attorney General of New York
- Józef Światło, Polish intelligence officer
- Leopold Trepper, Soviet spy
- Shevah Weiss, Israeli speaker of the Kneset
- Simon Wiesenthal, hunter of Nazis
- Grigory Yavlinsky, Russian politician

== Academics ==
- Szymon Askenazy
- Herman Auerbach
- Meir Balaban
- Georges Charpak
- Józef Feldman
- Sigmund Freud, born to Galician Jewish parents in Příbor (Moravia, then Austrian Empire)
- Henryk Grossman
- Roald Hoffmann
- Leopold Infeld
- Ludwig von Mises
- Richard von Mises
- Lewis Bernstein Namier
- Jakub Karol Parnas
- Simhah Pinsker
- Isidor Isaac Rabi
- Wilhelm Reich, psychologist
- Jakob Rosanes
- Manfred Sakel
- Juliusz Schauder
- Hugo Steinhaus
- Adam Ulam
- Stanisław Ulam
- Michael Zohary

== Cultural figures ==
- Harry Abend
- Shmuel Yosef Agnon
- Mordecai Ardon
- Emanuel Ax
- Erwin Axer
- Adolph Baller
- Salo Wittmayer Baron
- Chris Barron, lead singer of the Spin Doctors
- Leah Bergstein (1902–1989), choreographer
- Naftule Brandwein
- Berl Broder
- Mel Brooks
- Martin Buber
- Solomon Buber
- Michael Dorfman
- Isaac Erter
- Reuven Fahn
- Emanuel Feuermann
- Karl Emil Franzos
- Ignaz Friedman
- Mordechai Gebirtig
- Maurycy Gottlieb
- Chaim Gross
- Nina Hartley
- Marian Hemar
- Jerzy Hoffman
- Moses Horowitz
- Naftali Herz Imber
- Tadeusz Kantor
- Stanisław Jerzy Lec
- Stanisław Lem
- Janusz Morgenstern
- Soma Morgenstern
- Arthur Murray
- Andrzej Munk
- Ostap Ortwin
- Teodor Parnicki
- Erna Rosenstein
- Henry Roth
- Joseph Roth
- Samuel Roth
- Heinrich Schenker
- Bruno Schulz
- Nissan Spivak
- Lee Strasberg
- Barbra Streisand
- Julian Stryjkowski
- Leopold Unger
- Billy Wilder
- David L. Wolper
- Samuel Yellin
- Velvel Zbarjer
- Menachem Avidom

== Chess players ==
- Izak Aloni, born in Lviv
- Alexander Beliavsky, born in Lviv
- Oscar Chajes, born in Brody
- Arthur Dunkelblum, born in Kraków
- Salo Flohr, born in Horodenka
- Henryk Friedman, lived in Lviv
- Edward Gerstenfeld, born in Lviv
- Max Judd, born in Kraków
- Salo Landau, born in Bochnia
- Menachem Oren, lived in Kraków
- Oskar Piotrowski, lived in Lviv
- Jakob Rosanes, born in Brody
- Leon Stolzenberg, lived in Ternopil
- Oscar Tenner, born in Lviv
- Daniel Yanofsky, born in Brody

== Others ==
- Arthur F. Burns, American economist
- Amalia Freud, mother of Sigmund Freud
- Mikhail Fridman, Russian businessman
- Gideon Hausner, Israeli jurist
- Józef Klotz, Polish footballer (soccer)
- Hersch Lauterpacht, British judge
- Julius Edgar Lilienfeld, inventor of the transistor
- Helena Rubinstein, cosmetics industrialist

== See also ==
- Galicia (Eastern Europe)
- Hasidic Judaism
- History of the Jews in Poland
- History of the Jews in Ukraine
- Lists of Jews
- List of Poles
- List of Polish Jews
- List of Ukrainians
- List of Ukrainian Jews
- List of people from Galicia (modern period)
