= 1994 SANFL Grand Final =

Woodville-West Torrens	Port Adelaide
10.9 (69)	15.16 (106)
	1	2	3	4
WWT	6.2 (38)	8.5 (53)	9.7 (61)	10.9 (69)
PA	2.4 (16)	4.7 (31)	6.13 (49)	15.16 (106)
- Date: Sunday 2 October 1994
- Stadium: Football Park
- Attendance: 40,598
- Umpires: Tim Pfeiffer, Richard Williams
- Coin toss won by: Woodville-West Torrens
- Kicked toward: North End

Accolades
- Best on Ground: Darryl Wakelin

The 1994 South Australian National Football League (SANFL) Grand Final saw the Port Adelaide Magpies defeat the Woodville-West Torrens Eagles by 37 points after being 35 points behind in the first quarter. The match was played on 2 October 1994 at Football Park in front of a crowd of 40,598.

== Background ==
Despite Port Adelaide's recent success, having won 4 premierships in the 6 years leading up to 1994, the Eagles were seen as the superior team coming into the Grand Final. Port had lost several key players in recent years to the AFL and retirement, and the Eagles had thrashed Port just 2 weeks earlier in the 2nd Semi Final by 73 points.

Betting before the Grand Final saw Woodville-West Torrens as clear favourites with 1/3 odds and Port at 25/10. Port's odds could have been even higher if not for their outstanding record in Grand Finals, and their reputation for beating better teams.

== Match Summary ==
At the 25-minute mark of the first quarter, the Eagles led by 35 points and seemed to be headed towards certain victory. Port kicked the last 2 goals in the quarter to leave the Eagles with a 22-point lead.

The second quarter was evenly matched with both teams scoring 2.3, however the Eagles still seemed to have the game under control.

Port Adelaide fought back in the third quarter and outplayed the Eagles, but Port failed to capitalise due to inaccurate kicking for goal, scoring 2.6 (18) to 1.2 (8) for the quarter and still trailing by 12 points.

Port went into the final quarter with momentum and ran over the top of the Eagles. Port kicked 3 goals in the first 7 minutes to take the lead, and kicked 9.3 (57) to 1.2 (8) for the quarter to run out winners with a margin of 37 points. Full-forward Scott Hodges kicked 5 goals for the quarter.

== Teams ==
Port Adelaide was captained by Tim Ginever and coached by John Cahill. Woodville-West Torrens was captained by Peter Schwarz and coached by Bruce Winter.

Port Adelaide
B:	4 George Fiacchi	7 Roger Delaney (vc)	24 Mark Tylor
HB:	32 Paul Northeast	15 Darryl Wakelin	36 Stephen Carter
C:	27 David Hutton	9 Scott Spalding	13 Rohan Smith
HF:	16 Darryl Borlase	28 Darren Smith	25 Troy Olsen
F:	22 Tony Malakellis	11 Scott Hodges	2 Simon Pedler
Foll:	8 Brett Chalmers	10 Stephen Williams	1 Tim Ginever (c)
Int:	33 Darren Mead	14 Andrew McLeod	
Coach:	John Cahill		

Woodville West Torrens
B:	Peter Schwarz	Jason Spehr	Glenn Freeborn
HB:	Andrew Rogers	Mark Kennedy	Shaun Hannam
C:	Scott Camporeale	Christopher Kluzek	Andrew Payze
HF:	Nick Pesch	Sam Phillipou	Greg Walker
F:	Stuart Nicol	Andrew Taylor	Steven Sziller
Foll:	David Niemann	Scott Morphett	Jason Sziller
Int:	Greg Chapman	Brad Sheldrick	
Coach:	Bruce Winter		

== Scorecard ==
1994 SANFL Grand Final
Woodville-West Torrens	def. by	Port Adelaide	Football Park (crowd: 40,598)
6.2 (38); 8.5 (53); 9.7 (61); 10.9 (69)	Q1; Q2; Q3; Final	2.4 (16); 4.7 (31); 6.13 (49); 15.16 (106)
S. Morphett 4 A. Taylor 2 S. Nichol, N. Pesch, S. Sziller, G. Walker 1	Goals	6 S. Hodges; 2 A. McLeod, S. Williams, T. Ginever; 1 T. Malakellis, S. Pedler, D. Borlase

== Jack Oatey Medal ==
The Jack Oatey Medal for best player in the Grand Final was awarded to Darryl Wakelin of Port Adelaide.
