= 2000 SANFL Grand Final =

South Australian Grand Final Football League

Central District	Woodville-West Torrens
8.13 (61)	5.9 (39)
	1	2	3	4
CD	0.5 (5)	3.8 (26)	7.10 (52)	8.13 (61)
WWT	0.3 (3)	3.5 (23)	3.6 (24)	5.9 (39)
- Date: Sunday 10 September 2000
- Stadium: Football Park
- Attendance: 34,819
- Umpires: Williams, Woodcock, Pfieffer

The 2000 South Australian National Football League (SANFL) Grand Final saw the Central District Bulldogs defeat the Woodville-West Torrens by 22 points to claim the club's first ever premiership.

The match was played on Sunday 10 September 2000 at Football Park in front of a crowd of 34,819.

== Teams ==
Central District was captained by Dunny Hulm and coached by Peter Jonas. Woodville-West Torrens was captained by Andrew Rogers (footballer) and coached by Paul Hamilton (Australian footballer).

Central District
B:	Brent Guerra (#44)	Paul Geister (#31)	Damian Hicks (#14)
HB:	Quinton Graham (#38)	Brian Haraida (#19)	Heath Hopwood (#45)
C:	Michael Stevens (#10)	Ricky MacGowan (#23)	Daniel Stevens (#8)
HF:	Stuart Dew (#17)	Kynan Ford (#18)	Daniel Healy (#51)(Vice Captain)
F:	Daniel Hulm (#16)(Captain)	Sam McArdle (#13)	Marco Bello (#7)
Foll:	Radlee Moller (#24)	James Gowans (#28)	Chris Gowans (#21)
Int:	Damien Arnold (#5)	Nathan Steinberner (#34)	Matthew Slade (#59)
Coach:	Peter Jonas		

Woodville West Torrens
B:			
HB:			
C:			
HF:			
F:			
Foll:			
Int:	TBA	TBA	TBA
Coach:	Paul Hamilton (Australian footballer)		

Central District Goalkickers:
3 – Stuart Dew
3 – Daniel Healy
1 – Kynan Ford
1 – James Gowans

The Jack Oatey Medal for the best player on the ground was won by Central's James Gowans.
