= Lachie Jones =

Australian rules footballer (born 2002)

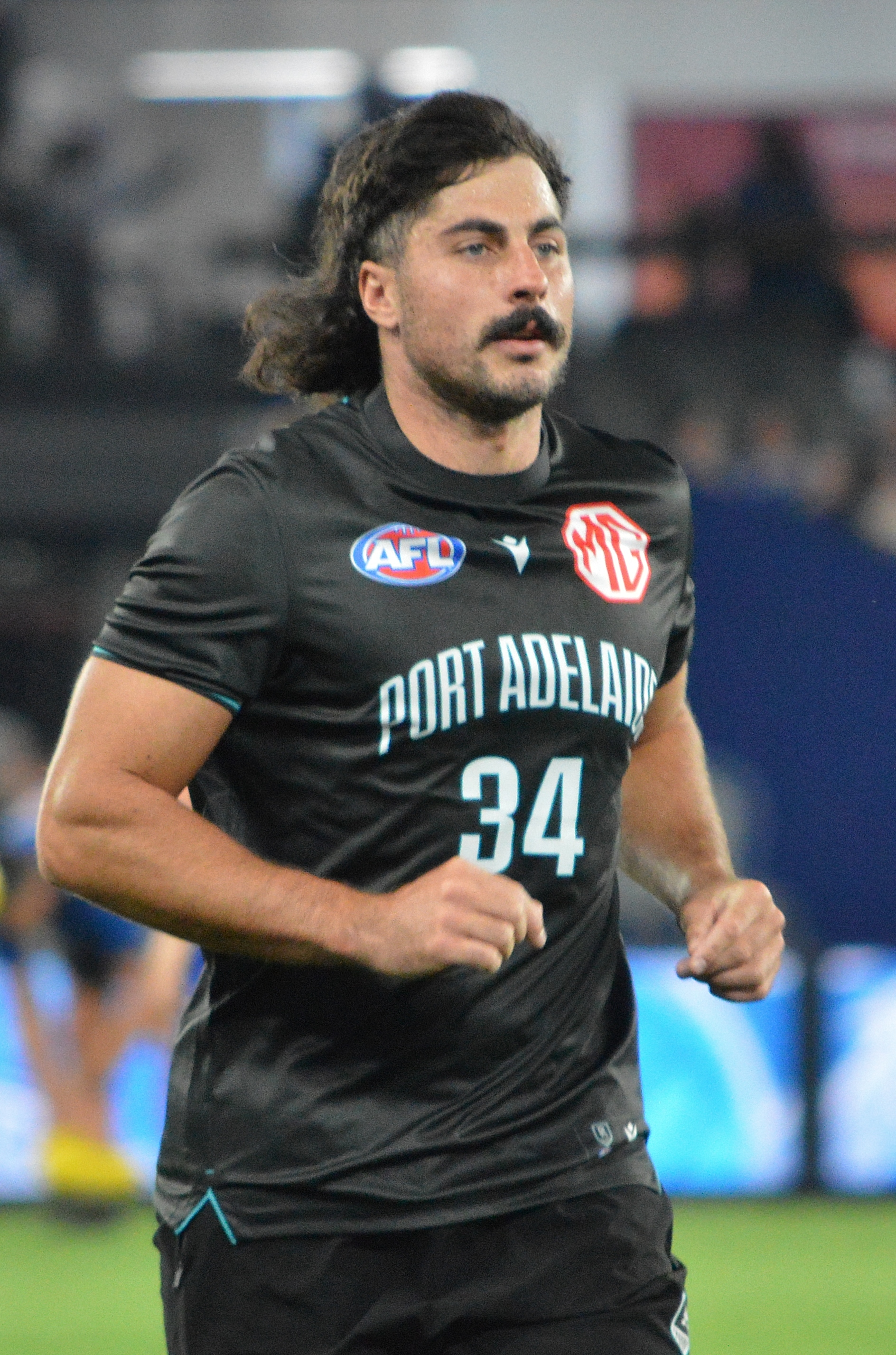
- Jones in March 2026

Personal information
- Full name: Lachlan Murray Jones
- Born: 9 April 2002 (age 24)
- Original teams: Woodville-West Torrens, SANFL
- Draft: No. 16, 2020 national draft
- Height: 186 cm (6 ft 1 in)
- Weight: 90 kg (198 lb)

Club information
- Current club: Port Adelaide
- Number: 34

Playing career^{1}
Years	Club	Games (Goals)
2021–	Port Adelaide	92 (9)
- ^{1} Playing statistics correct to the end of round 22, 2026.

Career highlights
- SANFL Premiership player (2020); Rising Star Nomination: 2022

Lachlan Murray Jones is an Australian rules footballer who plays for Port Adelaide in the Australian Football League (AFL).

Jones played in Woodville-West Torrens' SANFL premiership side in 2020.

An Indigenous Australian with Yanyuwa ancestry, Jones was a member of Port Adelaide's Next Generation Academy. He was raised in Bute, on South Australia's Yorke Peninsula. He was selected at Pick 16 at the 2020 AFL draft; Port Adelaide matched a bid by Collingwood.

He made his AFL debut in Round 4 of the 2021 AFL season against Richmond at Adelaide Oval.

Jones received a 2022 AFL Rising Star nomination in round 15 of the 2022 AFL season against Gold Coast, collecting sixteen disposals and kicking a goal during the two point win.

== Statistics ==
Updated to the end of round 22, 2026.

Legend
G	Goals	K	Kicks	D	Disposals	T	Tackles
B	Behinds	H	Handballs	M	Marks

Season	Team	No.	Games	Totals							Averages (per game)							Votes
Season	Team	No.	Games	G	B	K	H	D	M	T	G	B	K	H	D	M	T	Votes
2021	Port Adelaide	34	6	1	0	44	37	81	22	9	0.2	0.0	7.3	6.2	13.5	3.7	1.5	0
2022	Port Adelaide	34	14	1	1	73	68	141	36	30	0.1	0.1	5.2	4.9	10.1	2.6	2.1	0
2023	Port Adelaide	34	15	4	1	94	66	160	45	25	0.3	0.1	6.3	4.4	10.7	3.0	1.7	0
2024	Port Adelaide	34	21	0	0	121	103	224	68	39	0.0	0.0	5.8	4.9	10.7	3.2	1.9	0
2025	Port Adelaide	34	18	1	0	110	86	196	50	34	0.1	0.0	6.1	4.8	10.9	2.8	1.9	0
2026	Port Adelaide	34	18	2	0	140	82	222	65	36	0.1	0.0	7.8	4.6	12.3	3.6	2.0	0
Career			92	9	2	582	442	1024	286	173	0.1	0.0	6.3	4.8	11.1	3.1	1.9	0
