= 2006 SANFL season =

2006 South Australian National Football League season

- Teams: 9
- Premiers: Woodville-West Torrens; 2nd premiership
- Minor premiers: Woodville-West Torrens; 4th minor premiership
- Magarey Medallist: James Allan; North Adelaide (19 votes)
- Ken Farmer Medallist: Mark Passador; Woodville-West Torrens (79 Goals)
- Matches played: 96
- Highest: 25,130 (Grand Final, Woodville-West Torrens vs. Central District)

The 2006 South Australian National Football League season was the 127th season of the top-level Australian rules football competition in South Australia.

== Premiership season ==
=== Round 1 ===
	Round 1
Friday 31 March (7:40 pm)	Norwood 16.14 (110)	def.	Glenelg 15.9 (99)	Norwood Oval
Saturday 1 April (2:10 pm)	West Adelaide 10.11 (71)	def. by	Port Adelaide 13.20 (98)	Richmond Oval
Saturday 1 April (2:10 pm)	North Adelaide 18.14 (122)	def.	Woodville-West Torrens 15.10 (100)	Prospect Oval
Saturday 1 April (2:10 pm)	Central District 18.12 (120)	def.	Sturt 9.10 (64)	Elizabeth Oval
Bye: South Adelaide

=== Round 2 ===
	Round 2
Saturday 8 April (2:10 pm)	Port Adelaide 14.17 (101)	def.	Central District 8.9 (57)	Alberton Oval
Saturday 8 April (2:10 pm)	Glenelg 16.9 (105)	def.	Woodville-West Torrens 10.10 (70)	Glenelg Oval
Saturday 8 April (2:10 pm)	South Adelaide 19.9 (123)	def. by	North Adelaide 20.21 (141)	Hickinbotham Oval
Saturday 8 April (2:10 pm)	Sturt 15.7 (97)	def. by	Norwood 17.14 (116)	Unley Oval
Bye: West Adelaide

=== Round 3 ===
	Round 3
Saturday 15 April (2:10 pm)	Glenelg 22.16 (148)	def.	Central District 7.11 (53)	Adelaide Oval
Saturday 15 April (2:10 pm)	South Adelaide 21.13 (139)	def.	West Adelaide 12.11 (83)	Encounter Bay
Saturday 15 April (7:40 pm)	Woodville-West Torrens 15.11 (101)	def.	Norwood 15.9 (99)	Adelaide Oval
Bye: North Adelaide, Port Adelaide, Sturt

=== Round 4 ===
	Round 4
Friday 21 April (7:40 pm)	North Adelaide 27.16 (178)	def.	Sturt 13.8 (86)	Adelaide Oval
Saturday 22 April (2:10 pm)	Port Adelaide 17.15 (117)	def.	South Adelaide 11.8 (74)	Alberton Oval
Saturday 22 April (2:10 pm)	West Adelaide 15.14 (104)	def. by	Norwood 19.13 (127)	Richmond Oval
Tuesday 25 April (2:10 pm)	Central District 13.10 (88)	def. by	Woodville-West Torrens 16.15 (111)	Adelaide Oval
Bye: Glenelg

=== Round 5 ===
	Round 5
Friday 28 April (7:40 pm)	Norwood 10.14 (74)	def. by	Port Adelaide 18.11 (119)	Norwood Oval
Saturday 29 April (2:10 pm)	South Adelaide 20.16 (136)	def.	Sturt 13.10 (88)	Hickinbotham Oval
Saturday 29 April (2:10 pm)	Central District 18.10 (118)	def.	West Adelaide 7.8 (50)	Elizabeth Oval
Sunday 30 April (2:10 pm)	Glenelg 18.7 (115)	def. by	North Adelaide 22.20 (152)	Glenelg Oval
Bye: Woodville-West Torrens

=== Round 6 ===
	Round 6
Friday 5 May (7:40 pm)	North Adelaide 9.11 (65)	def. by	Central District 19.19 (133)	Adelaide Oval
Saturday 6 May (2:10 pm)	Sturt 23.12 (150)	def.	West Adelaide 15.8 (98)	Unley Oval
Saturday 6 May (2:10 pm)	South Adelaide 12.11 (83)	def. by	Glenelg 13.15 (93)	Hickinbotham Oval
Sunday 7 May (2:10 pm)	Woodville-West Torrens 14.15 (99)	def. by	Port Adelaide 17.11 (113)	Thebarton Oval
Bye: Norwood

=== Round 7 ===
	Round 7
Friday 12 May (7:40 pm)	Norwood 12.15 (87)	def.	South Adelaide 10.14 (74)	Norwood Oval
Saturday 13 May (2:10 pm)	Woodville-West Torrens 20.11 (131)	def.	Sturt 9.6 (60)	Woodville Oval
Saturday 13 May (2:10 pm)	West Adelaide 8.9 (57)	def. by	Glenelg 17.20 (122)	Richmond Oval
Saturday 13 May (2:10 pm)	North Adelaide 17.13 (115)	def.	Port Adelaide 14.7 (91)	Prospect Oval
Bye: Central District

=== Round 8 ===
	Round 8
Friday 19 May (7:40 pm)	Norwood 10.14 (74)	def. by	North Adelaide 15.11 (101)	Norwood Oval
Saturday 20 May (2:10 pm)	West Adelaide 8.10 (58)	def. by	Woodville-West Torrens 16.14 (110)	Richmond Oval
Saturday 20 May (2:10 pm)	Port Adelaide 19.15 (129)	def.	Glenelg 10.15 (75)	Alberton Oval
Saturday 20 May (2:10 pm)	South Adelaide 20.7 (127)	def.	Central District 10.11 (71)	Hickinbotham Oval
Bye: Sturt

=== Round 9 ===
	Round 9
Saturday 3 June (2:10 pm)	North Adelaide 9.14 (68)	def. by	Woodville-West Torrens 23.9 (147)	Thebarton Oval
Saturday 3 June (2:10 pm)	Central District 16.17 (113)	def.	Norwood 11.7 (73)	Elizabeth Oval
Saturday 3 June (2:10 pm)	Port Adelaide 9.7 (61)	def. by	West Adelaide 13.22 (100)	Alberton Oval
Saturday 3 June (2:10 pm)	Glenelg 14.11 (95)	def. by	Sturt 15.6 (96)	Glenelg Oval
Bye: South Adelaide

=== Round 10 ===
	Round 10
Saturday 10 June (2:10 pm)	Woodville-West Torrens 15.8 (98)	def.	South Adelaide 14.11 (95)	Woodville Oval
Saturday 10 June (2:10 pm)	Sturt 17.7 (109)	def. by	Central District 18.15 (123)	Unley Oval
Saturday 10 June (2:10 pm)	North Adelaide 23.20 (158)	def.	West Adelaide 5.9 (39)	Prospect Oval
Monday 12 June (2:10 pm)	Glenelg 19.15 (129)	def.	Norwood 7.9 (51)	Glenelg Oval
Bye: Port Adelaide

=== Round 11 ===
	Round 11
Saturday 17 June (2:10 pm)	Central District 17.13 (115)	def.	Port Adelaide 12.9 (81)	Elizabeth Oval
Saturday 17 June (2:10 pm)	Woodville-West Torrens 15.9 (99)	def.	Glenelg 13.9 (87)	Thebarton Oval
Saturday 17 June (2:10 pm)	West Adelaide 12.11 (83)	def. by	South Adelaide 16.15 (111)	Richmond Oval
Saturday 17 June (2:10 pm)	Norwood 12.16 (88)	def.	Sturt 12.10 (82)	Norwood Oval
Bye: North Adelaide

=== Round 12 ===
	Round 12
Friday 23 June (7:40 pm)	Norwood 11.10 (76)	def. by	Woodville-West Torrens 14.13 (97)	Norwood Oval
Friday 23 June (7:40 pm)	Sturt 14.9 (93)	def. by	North Adelaide 19.20 (134)	Adelaide Oval
Saturday 24 June (2:10 pm)	Glenelg 8.11 (59)	def. by	Central District 19.13 (127)	Glenelg Oval
Sunday 25 June (2:10 pm)	South Adelaide 24.18 (162)	def.	Port Adelaide 8.7 (55)	Hickinbotham Oval
Bye: West Adelaide

=== Round 13 ===
	Round 13
Saturday 1 July (2:10 pm)	Central District 7.8 (50)	def.	West Adelaide 5.12 (42)	Elizabeth Oval
Saturday 1 July (2:10 pm)	North Adelaide 15.16 (106)	def.	Glenelg 9.9 (63)	Prospect Oval
Saturday 1 July (2:10 pm)	South Adelaide 26.5 (161)	def.	Sturt 10.11 (71)	Hickinbotham Oval
Sunday 2 July (2:10 pm)	Port Adelaide 20.10 (130)	def.	Norwood 10.10 (70)	Alberton Oval
Bye: Woodville-West Torrens

=== Round 14 ===
	Round 14
Saturday 8 July (2:10 pm)	West Adelaide 14.16 (100)	def. by	Norwood 22.16 (148)	Adelaide Oval
Saturday 8 July (2:10 pm)	Sturt 11.11 (77)	def. by	Port Adelaide 23.14 (152)	Adelaide Oval
Saturday 8 July (2:10 pm)	Woodville-West Torrens 14.16 (100)	def.	Central District 12.4 (76)	Woodville Oval
Saturday 8 July (2:10 pm)	North Adelaide 20.18 (138)	def.	South Adelaide 13.12 (90)	Prospect Oval
Bye: Glenelg

=== Round 15 ===
	Round 15
Saturday 15 July (2:10 pm)	Port Adelaide 12.11 (83)	def. by	Woodville-West Torrens 19.11 (125)	Alberton Oval
Sunday 16 July (2:10 pm)	West Adelaide 5.14 (44)	def. by	Sturt 14.15 (99)	Richmond Oval
Sunday 16 July (2:10 pm)	Glenelg 19.10 (124)	def.	South Adelaide 11.16 (82)	Glenelg Oval
Bye: Central District, North Adelaide, Norwood

=== Round 16 ===
	Round 16
Saturday 22 July (2:10 pm)	Sturt 11.8 (74)	def. by	Woodville-West Torrens 31.7 (193)	Unley Oval
Saturday 22 July (2:10 pm)	Port Adelaide 11.8 (74)	def. by	North Adelaide 22.14 (146)	Alberton Oval
Saturday 22 July (2:10 pm)	Glenelg 28.12 (180)	def.	West Adelaide 14.11 (95)	Glenelg Oval
Saturday 22 July (2:10 pm)	Norwood 13.7 (85)	def.	Central District 12.11 (83)	Norwood Oval
Bye: South Adelaide

=== Round 17 ===
	Round 17
Saturday 29 July (2:10 pm)	Woodville-West Torrens 17.14 (116)	def.	West Adelaide 12.4 (76)	Woodville Oval
Saturday 29 July (2:10 pm)	North Adelaide 10.7 (67)	def. by	Norwood 10.13 (73)	Prospect Oval
Saturday 29 July (2:10 pm)	Central District 19.9 (123)	def.	South Adelaide 12.8 (80)	Elizabeth Oval
Sunday 30 July (2:10 pm)	Glenelg 27.14 (176)	def.	Port Adelaide 14.11 (95)	Glenelg Oval
Bye: Sturt

=== Round 18 ===
	Round 18
Saturday 5 August (2:10 pm)	Sturt 12.6 (78)	def. by	Central District 28.14 (182)	Adelaide Oval
Saturday 5 August (2:10 pm)	West Adelaide 15.10 (100)	def. by	North Adelaide 23.11 (149)	Richmond Oval
Saturday 5 August (2:10 pm)	Norwood 10.16 (76)	def. by	Glenelg 18.11 (119)	Norwood Oval
Sunday 6 August (2:10 pm)	South Adelaide 22.15 (147)	def.	Woodville-West Torrens 12.9 (81)	Hickinbotham Oval
Bye: Port Adelaide

=== Round 19 ===
	Round 19
Saturday 12 August (2:10 pm)	Woodville-West Torrens 21.21 (147)	def.	North Adelaide 13.11 (89)	Woodville Oval
Saturday 12 August (2:10 pm)	Port Adelaide 14.22 (106)	def.	Central District 11.16 (82)	Alberton Oval
Saturday 12 August (2:10 pm)	South Adelaide 23.12 (150)	def.	Norwood 17.15 (117)	Hickinbotham Oval
Saturday 12 August (2:10 pm)	Sturt 11.9 (75)	def. by	Glenelg 26.17 (173)	Unley Oval
Bye: West Adelaide

=== Round 20 ===
	Round 20
Saturday 19 August (2:10 pm)	West Adelaide 17.11 (113)	def. by	Port Adelaide 26.13 (169)	Richmond Oval
Saturday 19 August (2:10 pm)	Glenelg 22.10 (142)	def. by	North Adelaide 21.20 (146)	Glenelg Oval
Saturday 19 August (2:10 pm)	Sturt 11.13 (79)	def. by	South Adelaide 29.12 (186)	Unley Oval
Sunday 20 August (2:10 pm)	Woodville-West Torrens 18.14 (122)	def.	Norwood 12.10 (82)	Woodville Oval
Bye: Central District

=== Round 21 ===
	Round 21
Saturday 26 August (2:10 pm)	Port Adelaide 21.15 (141)	def.	Sturt 5.9 (39)	Alberton Oval
Saturday 26 August (2:10 pm)	North Adelaide 21.15 (141)	def.	South Adelaide 16.6 (102)	Prospect Oval
Saturday 26 August (2:10 pm)	Norwood 14.15 (99)	def. by	West Adelaide 23.12 (150)	Norwood Oval
Saturday 26 August (2:10 pm)	Central District 18.12 (120)	def.	Glenelg 11.4 (70)	Elizabeth Oval
Bye: Woodville-West Torrens

=== Round 22 ===
	Round 22
Friday 1 September (7:40 pm)	Norwood 18.14 (122)	def.	Sturt 15.10 (100)	Adelaide Oval
Saturday 2 September (2:10 pm)	South Adelaide 23.16 (154)	def.	West Adelaide 11.13 (79)	Hickinbotham Oval
Saturday 2 September (2:10 pm)	Central District 14.5 (89)	def. by	North Adelaide 14.7 (91)	Elizabeth Oval
Sunday 3 September (2:10 pm)	Woodville-West Torrens 16.13 (109)	def.	Port Adelaide 7.11 (53)	Woodville Oval
Bye: Glenelg

=== Round 23 ===
	Round 23
Friday 8 September (7:40 pm)	Port Adelaide 16.6 (102)	def. by	North Adelaide 20.16 (136)	Adelaide Oval
Saturday 9 September (2:10 pm)	Glenelg 16.12 (108)	def. by	South Adelaide 24.13 (157)	Adelaide Oval
Sunday 10 September (2:10 pm)	Sturt 9.10 (64)	def. by	Woodville-West Torrens 20.10 (130)	Unley Oval
Sunday 10 September (2:10 pm)	West Adelaide 7.16 (58)	def. by	Central District 17.16 (118)	Richmond Oval
Bye: Norwood

== Ladder ==
2006 SANFL Ladder
Pos	Team	Pld	W	L	D	PF	PA	PP	Pts
1	Woodville-West Torrens (P)	20	16	4	0	2286	1715	57.14	32
2	North Adelaide	20	16	4	0	2443	1983	55.20	32
3	Central District	20	12	8	0	2041	1698	54.59	24
4	South Adelaide	20	11	9	0	2433	1977	55.17	22
5	Port Adelaide	20	11	9	0	2070	2015	50.67	22
6	Glenelg	20	10	10	0	2282	1979	53.56	20
7	Norwood	20	9	11	0	1847	2137	46.36	18
8	Sturt	20	3	17	0	1681	2703	38.34	6
9	West Adelaide	20	2	18	0	1600	2476	39.25	4

Rules for classification: 1) points; 2) percentage; 3) number of points for.
(P) Premiers

== Finals series ==
=== Week one – Qualifying and elimination finals ===
	Elimination final
Sunday 17 September (12:15 pm)	South Adelaide 18.12 (120)	def.	Port Adelaide 16.8 (104)	Adelaide Oval (crowd: See below)

	Qualifying final
Sunday 17 September (3:15 pm)	North Adelaide 13.8 (86)	def. by	Central District 18.16 (124)	Adelaide Oval (crowd: 11,902)

=== Week two – Semi-finals ===
	First Semi-final
Sunday 24 September (12:15 pm)	North Adelaide 14.18 (102)	def.	South Adelaide 11.11 (77)	Adelaide Oval (crowd: See below)

	Second Semi-final
Sunday 24 September (3:15 pm)	Woodville-West Torrens 6.11 (47)	def. by	Central District 13.5 (83)	Adelaide Oval (crowd: 9,328)

=== Week three – Preliminary final ===
	Preliminary final
Sunday 1 October (3:15 pm)	Woodville-West Torrens 13.20 (98)	def.	North Adelaide 13.13 (91)	Adelaide Oval (crowd: 8,046)

== Grand final ==
2006 SANFL Grand Final
Sunday 8 October (2:10 pm)	Central District	def. by	Woodville-West Torrens	Football Park (crowd: 25,130)
2.1 (13); 3.1 (19); 4.1 (25); 7.3 (45)	Q1; Q2; Q3; Final	3.8 (26); 5.10 (40); 12.15 (87); 17.19 (121)
