= 2026 SANFL Women's League season =

SANFL Women's League season

- Date: 18 April – 29 August 2026
- Teams: 8
- Premiers: Woodville-West Torrens; 1st premiership
- Runners-up: Norwood; 3rd runners-up result
- Minor premiers: Woodville-West Torrens; 2nd minor premiership
- Best and fairest: Jade Halfpenny (Norwood – 27 votes)
- Leading goalkicker: Klaudia O'Neill (Woodville-West Torrens – 33 goals)

The 2026 SANFL Women's League season was the tenth season of the SANFL Women's League (SANFLW), the state-level senior women's Australian rules football competition in South Australia. The season commenced on 18 April and concluded with the grand final on 29 August 2026.

The competition was contested by eight clubs, all of whom were affiliated with clubs from the men's South Australian National Football League (SANFL).

== Clubs ==
Club	Home ground	Capacity
Central District	X Convenience Oval	18,000
Glenelg	Stratarama Stadium	15,000
North Adelaide	Revo Fitness Oval	4,000
Norwood	Coopers Stadium	10,000
South Adelaide	Magain Stadium	12,000
Sturt	Thomas Farms Oval	10,000
West Adelaide	Richmond Oval	9,000
Woodville-West Torrens	Maughan Thiem Kia Oval	15,000

== Home-and-away season ==
=== Round 1 ===
	Round 1
Saturday 18 April (12:00 pm)	Central District 8.8 (56)	def.	North Adelaide 4.5 (29)	Maughan Thiem Kia Oval	Report
Saturday 18 April (12:00 pm)	West Adelaide 9.4 (58)	def.	Glenelg 8.6 (54)	Magain Stadium	Report
Saturday 18 April (2:15 pm)	Woodville-West Torrens 5.4 (34)	drew with	Sturt 5.4 (34)	Maughan Thiem Kia Oval	Report
Saturday 18 April (2:15 pm)	South Adelaide 5.10 (40)	def.	Norwood 2.2 (14)	Magain Stadium	Report

=== Round 2 ===
	Round 2
Saturday 25 April (9:30 am)	Sturt 9.4 (58)	def.	Glenelg 6.6 (42)	Thomas Farms Oval	Report
Saturday 25 April (11:30 am)	North Adelaide 7.3 (45)	def. by	Norwood 7.5 (47)	Revo Fitness Oval	Report
Saturday 25 April (2:50 pm)	West Adelaide 0.6 (6)	def. by	Woodville-West Torrens 13.11 (89)	Richmond Oval	Report
Saturday 25 April (2:50 pm)	Central District 1.6 (12)	def. by	South Adelaide 5.6 (36)	X Convenience Oval	Report

=== Round 3 ===
	Round 3
Saturday 2 May (10:30 am)	Central District 5.10 (40)	def. by	Woodville-West Torrens 8.7 (55)	Coopers Stadium	Report
Saturday 2 May (12:40 pm)	North Adelaide 4.6 (30)	def.	South Adelaide 3.6 (24)	Coopers Stadium	Report
Saturday 2 May (2:40 pm)	West Adelaide 2.3 (15)	drew with	Sturt 2.3 (15)	Coopers Stadium	Report
Saturday 2 May (5:00 pm)	Norwood 7.13 (55)	def.	Glenelg 2.3 (15)	Coopers Stadium	Report

=== Round 4 ===
	Round 4
Saturday 9 May (11:00 am)	North Adelaide 5.9 (39)	def. by	Woodville-West Torrens 7.5 (47)	X Convenience Oval	Report
Saturday 9 May (1:10 pm)	Norwood 10.6 (66)	def.	West Adelaide 4.5 (29)	X Convenience Oval	Report
Saturday 9 May (3:20 pm)	Central District 4.4 (28)	drew with	Glenelg 4.4 (28)	X Convenience Oval	Report
Sunday 10 May (11:00 am)	South Adelaide 4.8 (32)	def.	Sturt 4.2 (26)	Magain Stadium	Report

=== Round 5 ===
	Round 5
Saturday 23 May (9:20 am)	Sturt 3.6 (24)	def.	Central District 1.7 (13)	Thomas Farms Oval	Report
Saturday 23 May (12:40 pm)	Norwood 2.6 (18)	def. by	North Adelaide 3.9 (27)	Coopers Stadium	Report
Saturday 23 May (3:50 pm)	South Adelaide 10.8 (68)	def.	West Adelaide 1.1 (7)	Magain Stadium	Report
Saturday 23 May (5:00 pm)	Glenelg 5.4 (34)	def. by	Woodville-West Torrens 8.5 (53)	Stratarama Stadium	Report

=== Round 6 ===
	Round 6
Saturday 30 May (12:00 pm)	South Adelaide 3.4 (22)	def. by	Woodville-West Torrens 4.4 (28)	Magain Stadium	Report
Saturday 30 May (3:30 pm)	Glenelg 3.10 (28)	def.	West Adelaide 0.3 (3)	Stratarama Stadium	Report
Saturday 30 May (5:00 pm)	Central District 5.3 (33)	def. by	Norwood 7.1 (43)	X Convenience Oval	Report
Sunday 31 May (2:40 pm)	Sturt 2.7 (19)	def. by	North Adelaide 5.2 (32)	Thomas Farms Oval	Report

=== Round 7 ===
	Round 7
Saturday 6 June (9:20 am)	North Adelaide 3.4 (22)	def. by	West Adelaide 4.4 (28)	Revo Fitness Oval	Report
Saturday 6 June (12:00 pm)	Glenelg 1.2 (8)	def. by	South Adelaide 9.7 (61)	Stratarama Stadium	Report
Saturday 6 June (4:50 pm)	Woodville-West Torrens 4.7 (31)	def.	Central District 3.0 (18)	Maughan Thiem Kia Oval	Report
Monday 8 June (9:20 am)	Sturt 6.4 (40)	def.	Norwood 3.5 (23)	Thomas Farms Oval	Report

=== Round 8 ===
	Round 8
Saturday 20 June (9:00 am)	Woodville-West Torrens 5.3 (33)	def.	West Adelaide 1.1 (7)	Revo Fitness Oval	Report
Saturday 20 June (11:10 am)	Glenelg 2.5 (17)	def. by	Sturt 8.6 (54)	Revo Fitness Oval	Report
Saturday 20 June (1:20 pm)	Norwood 4.12 (36)	def.	South Adelaide 3.1 (19)	Revo Fitness Oval	Report
Saturday 20 June (3:30 pm)	North Adelaide 2.6 (18)	def. by	Central District 3.2 (20)	Revo Fitness Oval	Report

=== Round 9 ===
	Round 9
Saturday 27 June (9:20 am)	North Adelaide 4.8 (32)	def.	Glenelg 1.3 (9)	Revo Fitness Oval	Report
Saturday 27 June (10:00 am)	Central District 5.3 (33)	def.	West Adelaide 3.2 (20)	X Convenience Oval	Report
Saturday 27 June (2:50 pm)	Woodville-West Torrens 5.2 (32)	def. by	Norwood 6.7 (43)	Maughan Thiem Kia Oval	Report
Saturday 27 June (2:50 pm)	Sturt 7.5 (47)	def.	South Adelaide 1.8 (14)	Thomas Farms Oval	Report

=== Round 10 ===
	Round 10
Saturday 4 July (10:30 am)	Sturt 3.3 (21)	def. by	West Adelaide 4.13 (37)	Stratarama Stadium	Report
Saturday 4 July (12:40 am)	Woodville-West Torrens 3.2 (20)	def. by	North Adelaide 8.5 (53)	Stratarama Stadium	Report
Saturday 4 July (2:50 pm)	South Adelaide 1.8 (14)	def. by	Central District 3.6 (24)	Stratarama Stadium	Report
Saturday 4 July (5:00 pm)	Glenelg 2.6 (18)	def. by	Norwood 11.6 (72)	Stratarama Stadium	Report

=== Round 11 ===
	Round 11
Saturday 18 July (12:00 pm)	South Adelaide 13.10 (88)	def.	Glenelg 2.2 (14)	Magain Stadium	Report
Saturday 18 July (12:00 am)	Sturt 7.8 (50)	drew with	Woodville-West Torrens 7.8 (50)	Thomas Farms Oval	Report
Sunday 19 July (12:00 pm)	West Adelaide 3.4 (22)	def. by	North Adelaide 6.2 (38)	Richmond Oval	Report
Sunday 19 July (12:30 pm)	Norwood 7.11 (53)	def.	Central District 3.5 (23)	Coopers Stadium	Report

=== Round 12 ===
	Round 12
Saturday 25 July (10:30 am)	Glenelg 4.3 (27)	def. by	North Adelaide 7.4 (46)	Richmond Oval	Report
Saturday 25 July (12:40 am)	Norwood 2.6 (18)	def. by	Sturt 4.8 (32)	Richmond Oval	Report
Saturday 25 July (2:50 pm)	Woodville-West Torrens 5.6 (36)	def.	South Adelaide 5.5 (35)	Richmond Oval	Report
Saturday 25 July (5:00 pm)	West Adelaide 6.4 (40)	def.	Central District 2.8 (20)	Richmond Oval	Report

=== Round 13 ===
	Round 13
Saturday 1 August (2:50 am)	Woodville-West Torrens 5.7 (37)	def.	Glenelg 2.5 (17)	Maughan Thiem Kia Oval	Report
Saturday 1 August (4:50 am)	Central District 3.3 (21)	def. by	Sturt 6.7 (43)	X Convenience Oval	Report
Saturday 1 August (5:00 pm)	West Adelaide 4.4 (28)	drew with	Norwood 4.4 (28)	Richmond Oval	Report
Sunday 2 August (12:00 pm)	South Adelaide 0.3 (3)	def. by	North Adelaide 6.7 (43)	Magain Stadium	Report

=== Round 14 ===
	Round 14
Friday 7 August (6:30 pm)	Norwood 12.13 (85)	def.	Woodville-West Torrens 7.5 (47)	Coopers Stadium	Report
Saturday 8 August (11:00 am)	Glenelg 4.6 (30)	def. by	Central District 6.9 (45)	Stratarama Stadium	Report
Saturday 8 August (2:50 pm)	North Adelaide 8.4 (52)	def.	Sturt 3.6 (24)	Revo Fitness Oval	Report
Sunday 9 August (11:50 am)	West Adelaide 1.8 (14)	def. by	South Adelaide 9.4 (58)	Richmond Oval	Report

== Ladder ==
Pos	Team	Pld	W	L	D	PF	PA	PP	Pts	Qualification
1	Woodville-West Torrens (P)	14	9	3	2	592	483	55.07	20	Finals series
2	Norwood	14	9	4	1	601	428	58.41	19	Finals series
3	North Adelaide	14	9	5	0	506	364	58.16	18	Finals series
4	Sturt	14	7	4	3	487	400	54.90	17	Finals series
5	South Adelaide	14	7	7	0	514	339	60.26	14	
6	Central District	14	5	8	1	386	464	45.41	11	
7	West Adelaide	14	4	8	2	314	573	35.40	10	
8	Glenelg	14	1	12	1	341	690	33.07	3	

Source: Australian Football
Rules for classification: 1) points; 2) percentage; 3) number of points for.
(P) Premiers

== Finals series ==
=== Semi-finals ===
	First Semi Final
Sunday 16 August (11:30 am)	Woodville-West Torrens 9.8 (62)	def.	Norwood 7.5 (47)	Maughan Thiem Kia Oval	Report

	Second Semi Final
Sunday 16 August (1:40 pm)	North Adelaide 9.6 (60)	def.	Sturt 3.5 (23)	Maughan Thiem Kia Oval	Report

=== Preliminary final ===
	Preliminary Final
Sunday 23 August (1:30 pm)	Norwood 8.4 (52)	def.	North Adelaide 5.9 (39)	Coopers Stadium	Report

=== Grand Final ===
2026 SANFLW Grand Final
Sunday 30 August (4:10 pm)	Woodville-West Torrens	def.	Norwood	Alberton Oval
3.1 (19); 5.1 (31); 7.2 (44); 9.4 (58)	Q1; Q2; Q3; Final	0.1 (1); 1.4 (10); 2.6 (18); 3.8 (26)	Umpires: Ridge, Tonellato, Abbott; Best on ground: Klaudia O’Neill (Woodville-West Torrens); Television broadcast: Seven Network
O'Neill 5 Ilet 2 Lynch, Tran 1	Goals	Klaebe, Rusden, Simmonds 1
O’Neill, Freemantle, Buethke, Lynch, Cutting	Best	Halfpenny, Morgan, Cocks, Klaebe, Jaques

== Awards ==
- SANFL Women's Best and Fairest

Jade Halfpenny – 27 votes (Norwood)

- Coaches Award

Jade Halfpenny – 93 votes (Norwood)

- Leading Goal Kicker Award

Klaudia O'Neill – 33 goals (Woodville-West Torrens)

- Leadership Award

Jade Halfpenny (Norwood)

- Breakthrough Player

Alice Tentye (Woodville-West Torrens)

- Under 18 Premiers

Norwood

2026 SANFL Women's Team of the Year
B:	Alexandra Ballard (Sturt)	Annie Falkenberg (Woodville-West Torrens)	
HB:	Tahlita Buethke (Woodville-West Torrens)	Jamie Parish (North Adelaide)	Ella Metcalfe (North Adelaide)
C:	Holly Ifould (South Adelaide)	Alice Tentye (Woodville-West Torrens)	Coby Morgan (Norwood)
HF:	Melissa Anderson (South Adelaide)	Amber Ward (North Adelaide)	Zoe Venning (West Adelaide)
F:	Madeline Nuss (Sturt)	Klaudia O'Neill (Woodville-West Torrens)	
Foll:	Soriah Moon (South Adelaide)	Jade Halfpenny (Norwood) (c)	Isobel Kuiper (Sturt)
Int:	Iilish Ross (West Adelaide)	Lani Cocks (Norwood)	Miyu Endersby (Central District)
Int:	Georgia Swan (Sturt)	Isla Wiencke (Glenelg)	
Coach:	Narelle Smith (Woodville-West Torrens)		

== Representative matches ==
=== SANFLW vs VFLW ===
For the second consecutive season, an interstate representative match was arranged against the VFL Women's (VFLW). As was the case with the 2025 fixture, the match was timed to coincide with the AFL's Gather Round fixtures in Adelaide. The match was held as part of a double-header with the equivalent men's interstate match.

2026 State Game
Saturday, 11 April (12:00 ACST)	SANFLW	def.	VFLW	Stratarama Stadium
0.0 (0); 1.2 (8); 2.3 (15); 3.4 (22)	Q1; Q2; Q3; Final	0.4 (4); 1.5 (11); 1.7 (13); 2.8 (20)	SANFLW Best on ground & VFLW Best on ground: Mikaylah Antony (SANFLW) & Dom Carbone (VFLW); Television broadcast: AFL.com.au
Anderson, Lee, O'Neill 1	Goals	Reid, Sanger 1
Antony, Venning, Tentye, Moon, King	Best	Carbone, Chaston, Reid, Thorne, Sanger

==== South Australian team ====
2026 SANFLW State Team vs. Victoria
B:	5. Marie Martino; (Woodville-West Torrens)	21. Tiffany King; (South Adelaide)	
HB:	14. Jamie Parish; (North Adelaide)	26. Annie Falkenberg (c); (Woodville-West Torrens)	3. Tahlita Buethke; (Woodville-West Torrens)
C:	19. Coby Morgan; (Norwood)	9. Zoe Venning; (West Adelaide)	2. Laitiah Huynh; (Central District)
HF:	10. Laqouiya Cockatoo Motlap; (South Adelaide)	22. Jade Halfpenny; (Norwood)	6. Melissa Anderson; (South Adelaide)
F:	24. Katelyn Rosenzweig; (Central District)	27. Klaudia O'Neill; (Woodville-West Torrens)	
Foll:	25. Soriah Moon; (South Adelaide)	4. Alice Tentye; (Woodville-West Torrens)	1. Mikaylah Antony; (Central District)
Int:	20. Kiana Lee; (Glenelg)	17. Georgia Madigan; (Central District)	16. Emily Bartsch; (Woodville-West Torrens)
Int:	7. Isobel Kuiper; (Sturt)	13. Madi Russell; (West Adelaide)	18. Sophie Thredgold; (Sturt)
Coach:	Narelle Smith (Woodville-West Torrens)		
Emg:	23. Georgie Jaques; (Norwood)	8. Holly Ifould; (South Adelaide)	12. Emily Brockhurst; (South Adelaide)

=== WAFLW vs SANFLW ===
For the third successive season, an interstate representative match was fixtured between the SANFLW and WAFL Women's (WAFLW).

2026 State Game
Saturday, 16 May (12:40pm AWST)	WAFLW	def.	SANFLW	Sullivan Logistics Stadium
3.5 (23); 7.6 (48); 14.8 (92); 15.9 (99)	Q1; Q2; Q3; Final	0.0 (0); 0.1 (1); 0.1 (1); 1.1 (7)	Best on ground medal (WAFLW) & Best on ground medal (SANFLW): Jayme Harken (WAFLW) & Alice Tentye (SANFLW); Television broadcast: YouTube
Stockwell 4 Greenwood 3 Britton, Lindgren, Petrevski 2 Shannon, Tuhakaraina 1	Goals	Anderson 1
Harken, Stockwell, Petrevski, Henry, Greenwood, Shannon	Best	Tentye, Venning, King, Wiencke, Ballard

==== South Australian team ====
2026 SANFLW State Team vs. Western Australia
B:	5. Marie Martino; (Woodville-West Torrens)	21. Tiffany King; (South Adelaide)	
HB:	17. Georgia Madigan; (Central District)	26. Annie Falkenberg (c); (Woodville-West Torrens)	3. Tahlita Buethke; (Woodville-West Torrens)
C:	19. Coby Morgan; (Norwood)	9. Zoe Venning; (West Adelaide)	8. Holly Ifould; (South Adelaide)
HF:	20. Kiana Lee; (Glenelg)	22. Jade Halfpenny; (Norwood)	6. Melissa Anderson; (South Adelaide)
F:	14. Lauren Breguet; (Central District)	27. Klaudia O'Neill; (Woodville-West Torrens)	
Foll:	25. Soriah Moon; (South Adelaide)	4. Alice Tentye; (Woodville-West Torrens)	7. Dakota Willams; (Central District)
Int:	23. Georgia King; (Sturt)	2. Laitiah Huynh; (Central District)	12. Isla Wiencke; (Glenelg)
Int:	11. Aprille Crooks; (North Adelaide)	16. Emily Bartsch; (Norwood)	18. Alex Ballard; (Sturt)
Coach:	Narelle Smith (Woodville-West Torrens)		

== See also ==
- 2026 SANFL season
