= Greg Walker (footballer) =

Australian rules footballer

Personal information
- Full name: Gregory William Walker
- Born: 8 July 1967 (age 59); Midland, Western Australia
- Original team: Midland JFC / Guildford Grammar School
- Position: Rover

Playing career^{1}
Years	Club	Games (Goals)
1986–94; 1996–98	Swan Districts	139 (136)
1994–95	Woodville-West Torrens	42 (25)
Total		181 (161)
- ^{1} Playing statistics correct to the end of 1998.

Career highlights
- Western Australia Under-18 representative 1984; Swan Districts premiership side 1990; Simpson Medal 1990 (Grand Final); Swan Districts leading goalkicker 1996

Gregory William Walker (born 8 July 1967 in Midland, Western Australia) is a former Australian rules footballer who played for Swan Districts in the West Australian Football League (WAFL) and Woodville-West Torrens in the South Australian National Football League (SANFL).

== Career ==
Walker is the son of Bill Walker, who played 305 games for Swan Districts between 1961 and 1976. He was educated at Guildford Grammar School, and played junior football for Midland JFC. He represented the Western Australia Under-18 side at the 1984 Teal Cup, playing as a rover, and made his WAFL colts debut for Swan Districts in 1985. He made his senior debut in 1987, but his initial career was disrupted by three separate bouts of glandular fever between 1987 and 1989. Walker managed a full pre-season in 1990, and played every game, including the Swans' winning grand final, winning the 1990 Simpson Medal as best on ground in the grand final.

Walker transferred to Adelaide in 1994 due to his work in the wine industry taking him to South Australia. He represented Woodville-West Torrens in two seasons which including the losing 1994 Grand Final side. He moved back to Western Australia in 1996 where he continued his form, kicking 33 goals from 21 games and finishing fifth in the Sandover Medal count. Walker retired in mid-1998 to focus on his work in the hospitality industry, but continued in several roles at Swan Districts.
