= Hayden Skipworth =

Australian rules footballer, born 1983

Personal information
- Nickname: Skippy
- Born: 25 February 1983 (age 43)
- Original team: Woodville-West Torrens (SANFL)
- Debut: Round 1, 1 April 2001, Adelaide vs. Sydney Swans, at the SCG
- Height: 180 cm (5 ft 11 in)
- Weight: 80 kg (176 lb)

Playing career^{1}
Years	Club	Games (Goals)
2001–2006	Adelaide	44 (22)
2009	Essendon	11 (11)
Total		55 (33)
- ^{1} Playing statistics correct to the end of 2009.

Career highlights
- SANFL premiership player: 2006; Jack Oatey Medal: 2006

Hayden Skipworth (born 25 February 1983) is a former Australian rules footballer who played in the Australian Football League (AFL) with the Adelaide Football Club and the Essendon Football Club. Skipworth returned to the Essendon Football Club, where he served as the midfield coach until the conclusion of the 2019 Season. In the 2020 season, Skipworth served as the Collingwood Football Club's Head of Academy before moving into a Line Coach position at the club in October 2020.

== Early career ==
A midfielder-small forward originally from Arthurton in the Yorke Peninsula, Skipworth originally played with the Central Yorke (CY) Cougars, before being recruited by South Australian National Football League (SANFL) club Woodville-West Torrens.

== Adelaide career ==
Skipworth was drafted 53rd overall by Adelaide in the 2000 AFL draft and made his AFL debut in round 1 of the 2001 season against the Sydney Swans at the Sydney Cricket Ground, before playing another four matches that year and kicking one goal. Skipworth was de-listed at the end of the 2002 AFL season after failing to add to his overall matches tally, before being picked up by the Crows again for the 2003 season via the rookie draft (pick number 13 overall). Skipworth was elevated to the senior list again midway through that season after teammate Andrew Crowell sustained a serious knee injury and was placed on the club's long-term injury list.

Skipworth had his best AFL season in 2005, in which he played 21 matches, including three finals matches (against St Kilda, Port Adelaide and West Coast) and scored 12 goals. His stand-out performance of the 2005 season came in Round 6 against North Melbourne at AAMI Stadium, when he kicked four goals (including three within the space of five minutes in the second quarter) and finally the victory-sealing goal late in the final quarter) and had 20 possessions in a match-winning effort. At the Brownlow Medal count later that year he received three votes for a best-on-ground performance, taking his career tally to six votes overall (previously Skipworth had received three votes in Round 18 of the 2004 season, also against the Kangaroos at AAMI Stadium).

Skipworth spent most of the 2006 season with the SANFL side Woodville-West Torrens. He was the recipient of the Jack Oatey Medal as the best player in the SANFL Grand Final. He was later de-listed by the Crows at the end of the season whilst on holiday in the United States.

== SANFL career ==
During his time at the Woodville-West Torrens Eagles, Skipworth was involved in a premiership team across all grades (Under-17, Under-19, Reserves, and finally League). He was selected to join the AIS Academy in 2000, also representing Australia at Under-18's level in an International Rules Series that year. In 2003, he was named in The Advertiser SANFL team of the year. He is also a talented basketball player, making State Under-18 level before deciding to pursue football.

== Bendigo and Essendon career ==
In 2007, Skipworth played in the Victorian Football League with Bendigo Bombers, where he ruptured the patellar tendon in his knee after landing awkwardly after a marking contest during the first quarter of the Bendigo Bombers' loss to Port Melbourne at TEAC Oval. Skipworth recovered well enough to be a standout player in 2008 and was drafted by Essendon in the 2008 Pre-season Draft.

After adding only 11 games in his first year with his new club, Skipworth announced his retirement, citing constant injuries as the reason.

On 27 October 2010, it was announced that Skipworth would take up a full-time role at Essendon as a development coach but this did not eventuate. In the interim, Skipworth has signed on to play with teammate Damien Peverill at Aberfeldie Football Club in the Essendon District Football League in season 2011.
