= Bruce Winter =

Bruce Winter may refer to:

- Bruce W. Winter (born 1939), New Testament scholar
- Bruce Winter (footballer) (born 1953), Australian rules footballer
