= James Rowe (Australian footballer) =

Australian rules footballer

Personal information
- Full name: James Rowe
- Nickname: Jimmy
- Born: 17 September 1999 (age 27); Adelaide, South Australia
- Original teams: Henley/Woodville-West Torrens, (SANFL)
- Draft: No. 38, 2020 AFL draft
- Debut: Round 1, 2021, Adelaide vs. Geelong, at Adelaide Oval
- Height: 173 cm (5 ft 8 in)
- Weight: 71 kg (157 lb)
- Position: Forward

Playing career^{1}
Years	Club	Games (Goals)
2018–2020, 2023–	Woodville-West Torrens	55 (95)
2021–2022	Adelaide	36 (27)
2021–2022	Adelaide (SANFL)	7 (8)
- ^{1} Playing statistics correct to the end of round 15, 2023.

Career highlights
- SANFL premiership player: 2020; Ken Farmer Medalist: 2020

James "Jimmy" Rowe (born 17 September 1999) is a former professional Australian rules footballer who played for the Adelaide Football Club in the Australian Football League (AFL). Rowe was drafted with the 38th selection in the 2020 AFL draft. Previously playing for Woodville-West Torrens in the South Australian National Football League (SANFL), Rowe kicked 84 goals in 34 games across 2019 and 2020, earning the leading goal kicker in the SANFL for the 2020 season and helping guide the Eagles to the Premiership.

Rowe made his AFL debut in the opening round of the 2021 AFL season. He was delisted at the conclusion of the 2022 AFL season.

== Personal life ==
Rowe is the son of former Adelaide, Norwood and South Fremantle player, Stephen Rowe, who played for the Crows between 1991 and 1995. He is currently a radio host and football commentator with FIVEaa radio, and was commentating when James kicked his first goal in his first game.
