= Michael Godden =

Australian rules footballer

Personal information
- Full name: Michael Godden
- Nickname: Godsy
- Born: 12 February 1975 (age 51); Adelaide, South Australia
- Original team: West Adelaide (SANFL)
- Draft: No. 116, 1992 AFL draft
- Height: 175 cm (5 ft 9 in)
- Weight: 65 kg (143 lb)

Playing career^{1}
Years	Club	Games (Goals)
	West Adelaide	89
1993	Adelaide	0 (0)

Coaching career^{3}
Years	Club	Games (W–L–D)
2007–2009	Glenelg (R)	
2010–2018	Woodville-West Torrens	
2015–2017	South Australia	3
2021–2024; 2027–	Adelaide (R)	78 (40–38–0)
- ^{1} Playing statistics correct to the end of 1993.^{3} Coaching statistics correct as of 2024.

Career highlights
- 2011 SANFL premiership coach; 2× AFLCA development coach of the year; 2× SANFL Reserves premiership coach: 2007 & 2009

Michael Godden (born 12 February 1975) is a former professional Australian Football League player and the current senior coach of the Adelaide Football Club in the South Australian National Football League (SANFL). He was recruited from the West Adelaide Football Club to the Adelaide Crows in the Australian Football League (AFL) with the 116th selection in the 1992 AFL draft, but did not play a senior game. Godden has since coached Glenelg's reserves side, Woodville-West Torrens, and South Australia's state team.

== Playing career ==
Godden played 89 senior games for West Adelaide and 56 games for the reserves team in the SANFL. He was drafted with the 116th selection in the 1992 AFL draft, but was delisted after a single season with the Adelaide Crows without playing a senior game for the club.

== Coaching career ==
In 2007, Godden became the head coach of Glenelg's reserves team in the SANFL reserves league. The successful tenure at Glenelg which included a premiership in 2009 springboarded Godden's coaching career, and he became the senior coach of Woodville-West Torrens. In just his second season in the role, he coached the Eagles to the premiership in 2011. In 2018, Godden was awarded with a life membership by the SANFL.

In 2021, Godden became the new coach of Adelaide's SANFL team. He coached his 250th SANFL game in 2023, but his team lost two consecutive preliminary finals to evade a maiden grand final for the team.
