= Ciccolella =

Ciccolella or Cicolella is an Italian surname. Notable people with the surname include:

- Jude Ciccolella (born 1947), American actor
- Mike Ciccolella (born 1943), American footballer
- Justin Cicolella (born 1978), Australian footballer
