= Nick Pesch =

Australian rules footballer (born 1974)

Personal information
- Full name: Nick Pesch
- Born: 25 June 1974 (age 52)
- Original team: Woodville-West Torrens
- Draft: 41st, 1993 Pre-Season draft
- Height: 173 cm (5 ft 8 in)
- Weight: 80 kg (176 lb)

Playing career^{1}
Years	Club	Games (Goals)
1994–1996	Adelaide	31 (15)
1997	Melbourne	4 (0)
Total		35 (15)
- ^{1} Playing statistics correct to the end of 1997.

Nick Pesch (born 25 June 1974) is a former professional Australian rules footballer who played with the Adelaide Football Club and the Melbourne Football Club in the Australian Football League (AFL).

Pesch, who played in the 1993 Woodville-West Torrens SANFL premiership team, made his AFL debut late in the 1994 AFL season and put together regular games in 1995, appearing 15 times. During the 1995 season he kicked four goals in a match against Geelong. A rover, he was traded to Melbourne for Clay Sampson after struggling to have an impact in 1996. After one year at Melbourne, Pesch returned to Woodville-West Torrens and won their 'Best and Fairest' award in 1998. He is a member of the Woodville-West Torrens official 'Team of the Decade', on the interchange bench.
