= Jordan Foote =

Australian rules footballer

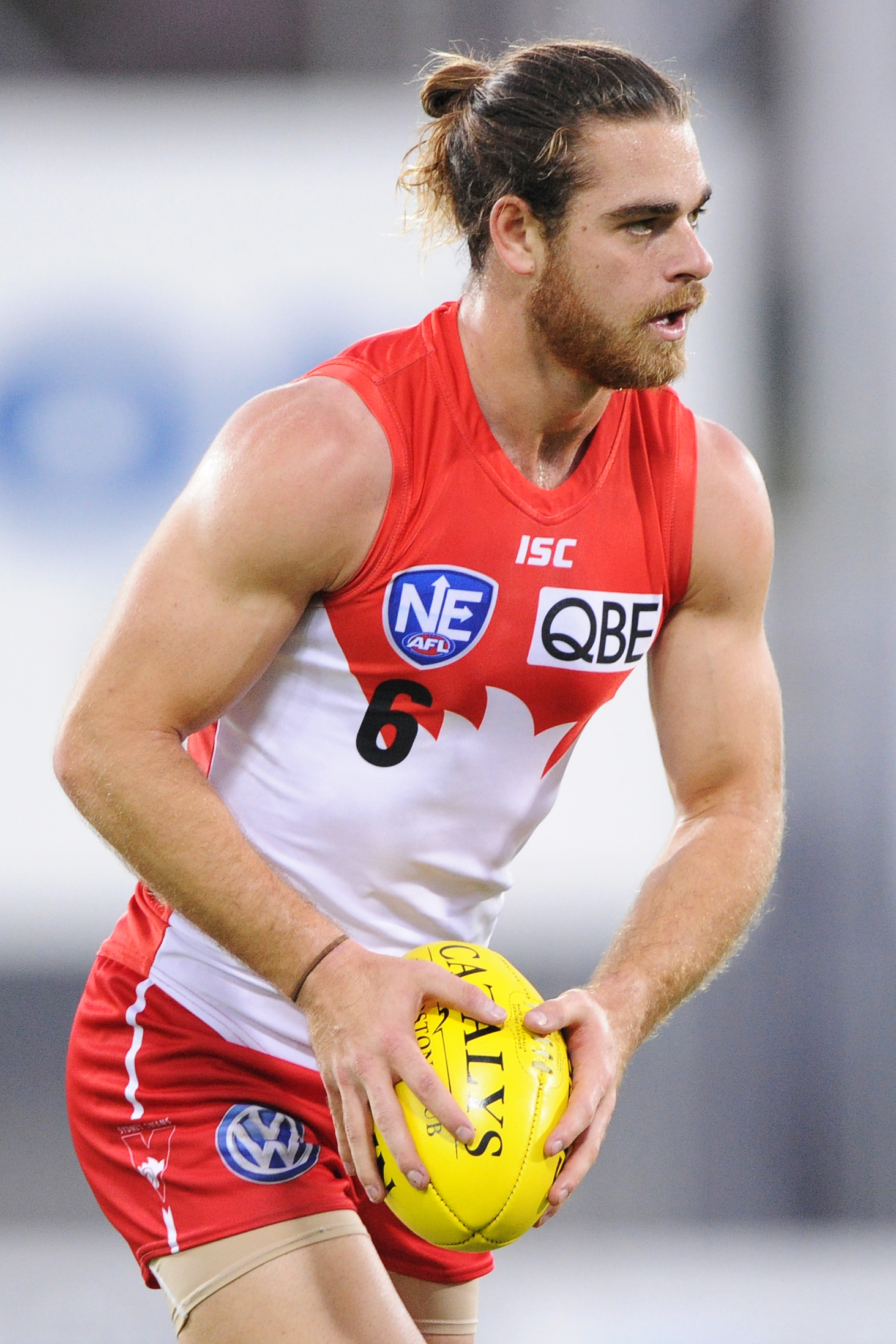
- Foote playing for Sydney in July 2018

Personal information
- Full name: Jordan Foote
- Born: 2 January 1996 (age 30)
- Original team: UNSW-Easts (Sydney AFL) Current team: Woodville-West Torrens (SANFL)
- Draft: No. 52, 2015 rookie draft
- Debut: Round 18, 2016, Sydney vs. Carlton, at SCG
- Height: 184 cm (6 ft 0 in)
- Weight: 81 kg (179 lb)
- Position: Midfielder

Playing career^{1}
Years	Club	Games (Goals)
2015–2018	Sydney	6 (1)
- ^{1} Playing statistics correct to the end of 2018.

Career highlights
- SANFL premiership player: 2020; Jack Oatey Medal: 2020

Jordan Foote (born 2 January 1996) is a former professional Australian rules footballer who played for the Sydney Swans in the Australian Football League (AFL). He was drafted by the Sydney Swans with their third selection and fifty-second overall in the 2015 rookie draft. He made his debut in the six point win against Carlton in round 18, 2016 at the Sydney Cricket Ground.

Foote was delisted at the end of the 2018 AFL season. Jordan was a member of the 2020 SANFL Grand Final playing for the Woodville-West Torrens winning side against the North Adelaide Football Club. He was also awarded the Jack Oatey Medal for being the best on ground.
