= 2011 SANFL season =

- Teams: 9
- Premiers: Woodville-West Torrens; 3rd premiership
- Minor premiers: Central District; 11th minor premiership
- Magarey Medallist: James Allen; North Adelaide (25 votes)
- Ken Farmer Medallist: Michael Wundke; South Adelaide (67 Goals)

Attendance
- Matches played: 96
- Total attendance: 343,596 (3,579 per match)
- Highest: 25,234 (Grand Final, Central District vs. Woodville-West Torrens)

The 2011 South Australian National Football League season was the 132nd season of the top-level Australian rules football competition in South Australia.

The season opened on 2 April with the opening fixture between Norwood and Port Adelaide, and concluded on 9 October with the Grand Final, in which the Minor Premiers Central District went on to lose to Woodville-West Torrens who recorded its 3rd premiership, winning by 3 points.

Norwood, Glenelg, South Adelaide, also made the top (final) five teams and participated in the finals series. Port Adelaide, West Adelaide, North Adelaide, Sturt all missed the top five, with Sturt finishing last to record its 19th wooden spoon.

== Premiership season ==
=== Round 1 ===
	Round 1
Saturday 2 April (2:10 pm)	Norwood 8.7 (55)	def.	Port Adelaide 7.10 (52)	Football Park
Saturday 2 April (2:10 pm)	North Adelaide 15.12 (102)	def. by	West Adelaide 17.9 (111)	Prospect Oval
Saturday 2 April (2:10 pm)	Glenelg 14.19 (103)	def.	Sturt 12.12 (84)	Glenelg Oval
Sunday 3 April (2:10 pm)	Woodville-West Torrens 11.12 (78)	def.	South Adelaide 10.3 (63)	Woodville Oval
Bye: Central District

=== Round 2 ===
	Round 2
Friday 8 April (2:10 pm)	Sturt 6.12 (48)	def. by	Norwood 19.12 (126)	Adelaide Oval
Friday 8 April (2:10 pm)	West Adelaide 14.12 (96)	def.	Central District 4.6 (30)	Richmond Oval
Saturday 9 April (2:10 pm)	Port Adelaide 9.9 (63)	def.	Glenelg 9.7 (61)	Alberton Oval
Saturday 9 April (2:10 pm)	South Adelaide 8.21 (69)	def.	North Adelaide 8.9 (57)	Hickinbotham Oval
Bye: Woodville-West Torrens

=== Round 3 ===
	Round 3
Friday 15 April (2:10 pm)	Sturt 13.17 (95)	def.	Woodville-West Torrens 5.7 (37)	Adelaide Oval
Friday 15 April (2:10 pm)	Norwood 8.7 (55)	def. by	Glenelg 10.16 (76)	Norwood Oval
Saturday 16 April (2:10 pm)	Central District 25.10 (160)	def.	South Adelaide 13.5 (83)	Elizabeth Oval
Sunday 17 April (2:10 pm)	North Adelaide 15.9 (99)	def.	Port Adelaide 10.11 (71)	Prospect Oval
Bye: West Adelaide

=== Round 4 ===
	Round 4
Thursday 21 April (2:10 pm)	West Adelaide 13.16 (94)	def.	Sturt 5.11 (41)	Richmond Oval
Thursday 21 April (2:10 pm)	South Adelaide 14.11 (95)	def.	Port Adelaide 12.7 (79)	Hickinbotham Oval
Saturday 23 April (2:10 pm)	North Adelaide 12.8 (80)	def. by	Woodville-West Torrens 15.5 (95)	Prospect Oval
Monday 25 April (2:10 pm)	Central District 16.11 (107)	def.	Norwood 9.10 (64)	Adelaide Oval
Bye: Glenelg

=== Round 5 ===
	Round 5
Saturday 30 April (2:10 pm)	Sturt 16.12 (108)	def.	North Adelaide 13.18 (96)	Unley Oval
Sunday 1 May (2:10 pm)	Port Adelaide 13.12 (90)	def.	West Adelaide 9.9 (63)	Alberton Oval
Sunday 1 May (2:10 pm)	Glenelg 8.8 (56)	def. by	Central District 21.5 (131)	Glenelg Oval
Sunday 1 May (2:10 pm)	Norwood 7.5 (47)	def. by	Woodville-West Torrens 11.5 (71)	Norwood Oval
Bye: South Adelaide

=== Round 6 ===
	Round 6
Saturday 7 May (2:10 pm)	West Adelaide 20.13 (133)	def.	South Adelaide 8.9 (57)	Richmond Oval
Saturday 7 May (2:10 pm)	Sturt 11.13 (79)	def. by	Central District 16.7 (103)	Unley Oval
Saturday 7 May (2:10 pm)	Glenelg 16.13 (109)	def.	North Adelaide 16.6 (102)	Glenelg Oval
Saturday 7 May (2:10 pm)	Woodville-West Torrens 15.7 (97)	def.	Port Adelaide 12.6 (78)	Woodville Oval
Bye: Norwood

=== Round 7 ===
	Round 7
Friday 13 May (2:10 pm)	West Adelaide 14.7 (91)	def.	Glenelg 7.12 (54)	Richmond Oval
Saturday 14 May (2:10 pm)	Central District 12.14 (86)	def.	Woodville-West Torrens 10.7 (67)	Elizabeth Oval
Saturday 14 May (2:10 pm)	North Adelaide 11.10 (76)	def. by	Norwood 16.7 (103)	Prospect Oval
Saturday 14 May (2:10 pm)	South Adelaide 10.17 (77)	def.	Sturt 11.7 (73)	Hickinbotham Oval
Bye: Port Adelaide

=== Round 8 ===
	Round 8
Friday 20 May (2:10 pm)	Sturt 16.11 (107)	def. by	Glenelg 25.14 (164)	Adelaide Oval
Friday 20 May (2:10 pm)	Norwood 22.12 (144)	def.	Port Adelaide 6.8 (44)	Norwood Oval
Friday 20 May (2:10 pm)	Woodville-West Torrens 8.9 (57)	def.	West Adelaide 7.10 (52)	Woodville Oval
Friday 20 May (2:10 pm)	South Adelaide 10.11 (71)	def. by	Central District 16.11 (107)	Hickinbotham Oval
Bye: North Adelaide

=== Round 9 ===
	Round 9
Friday 27 May (2:10 pm)	West Adelaide 4.8 (32)	def. by	Norwood 13.8 (86)	Richmond Oval
Saturday 28 May (2:10 pm)	Central District 16.5 (101)	def.	North Adelaide 14.10 (94)	Elizabeth Oval
Saturday 28 May (2:10 pm)	Port Adelaide 16.10 (106)	def.	South Adelaide 12.4 (76)	Alberton Oval
Saturday 28 May (2:10 pm)	Glenelg 10.14 (74)	def. by	Woodville-West Torrens 14.13 (97)	Glenelg Oval
Bye: Sturt

=== Round 10 ===
	Round 10
Saturday 4 June (2:10 pm)	Norwood 7.12 (54)	def.	Central District 7.11 (53)	Norwood Oval
Saturday 4 June (2:10 pm)	Woodville-West Torrens 13.12 (90)	def. by	North Adelaide 16.8 (104)	Woodville Oval
Saturday 4 June (2:10 pm)	South Adelaide 16.6 (102)	drew with	Glenelg 16.6 (102)	Hickinbotham Oval
Sunday 5 June (2:10 pm)	Port Adelaide 14.5 (89)	def.	Sturt 6.15 (51)	Alberton Oval
Bye: West Adelaide

=== Round 11 ===
	Round 11
Saturday 11 June (2:10 pm)	Central District 14.8 (92)	def.	Port Adelaide 10.7 (67)	Elizabeth Oval
Sunday 12 June (2:10 pm)	Sturt 10.8 (68)	def. by	Woodville-West Torrens 10.14 (74)	Unley Oval
Sunday 12 June (2:10 pm)	North Adelaide 10.7 (67)	def. by	West Adelaide 14.16 (100)	Prospect Oval
Monday 13 June (2:10 pm)	Glenelg 13.8 (86)	def. by	Norwood 15.10 (100)	Glenelg Oval
Bye: South Adelaide

=== Round 12 ===
	Round 12
Saturday 18 June (2:10 pm)	Central District 22.11 (143)	def.	Glenelg 6.14 (50)	Elizabeth Oval
Saturday 18 June (2:10 pm)	Sturt 16.10 (106)	def.	West Adelaide 7.6 (48)	Unley Oval
Saturday 18 June (2:10 pm)	Norwood 22.12 (144)	def.	South Adelaide 10.8 (68)	Norwood Oval
Byes: North Adelaide, Port Adelaide, Woodville-West Torrens

=== Round 13 ===
	Round 13
Friday 24 June (2:10 pm)	Norwood 21.7 (133)	def.	Sturt 11.3 (69)	Norwood Oval
Saturday 25 June (2:10 pm)	West Adelaide 7.11 (53)	def. by	Port Adelaide 18.11 (119)	Richmond Oval
Saturday 25 June (2:10 pm)	South Adelaide 14.10 (94)	def.	Woodville-West Torrens 11.13 (79)	Hickinbotham Oval
Saturday 25 June (2:10 pm)	North Adelaide 21.3 (129)	def.	Glenelg 15.10 (100)	Prospect Oval
Bye: Central District

=== Round 14 ===
	Round 14
Saturday 2 July (2:10 pm)	Port Adelaide 9.11 (65)	def. by	South Adelaide 13.10 (88)	Alberton Oval
Sunday 3 July (2:10 pm)	North Adelaide 10.7 (67)	def. by	Sturt 11.11 (77)	Prospect Oval
Sunday 3 July (2:10 pm)	Glenelg 20.15 (135)	def.	West Adelaide 14.6 (90)	Glenelg Oval
Sunday 3 July (2:10 pm)	Woodville-West Torrens 9.9 (63)	def. by	Central District 10.9 (69)	Woodville Oval
Bye: Norwood

=== Round 15 ===
	Round 15
Saturday 9 July (2:10 pm)	Sturt 5.8 (38)	def. by	Port Adelaide 15.20 (110)	Unley Oval
Saturday 9 July (2:10 pm)	Norwood 16.14 (110)	def.	North Adelaide 15.6 (96)	Norwood Oval
Sunday 10 July (2:10 pm)	Glenelg 11.9 (75)	def.	Woodville-West Torrens 10.13 (73)	Glenelg Oval
Sunday 10 July (2:10 pm)	South Adelaide 13.7 (85)	def. by	Central District 16.6 (102)	Hickinbotham Oval
Bye: West Adelaide

=== Round 16 ===
	Round 16
Saturday 16 July (2:10 pm)	Central District 17.5 (107)	def.	West Adelaide 11.15 (81)	Elizabeth Oval
Saturday 16 July (2:10 pm)	Sturt 13.11 (89)	def. by	South Adelaide 18.10 (118)	Unley Oval
Sunday 17 July (2:10 pm)	Woodville-West Torrens 12.8 (80)	def.	Norwood 7.10 (52)	Woodville Oval
Byes: Glenelg, North Adelaide, Norwood

=== Round 17 ===
	Round 17
Saturday 23 July (2:10 pm)	West Adelaide 5.9 (39)	def. by	Woodville-West Torrens 18.14 (122)	Richmond Oval
Saturday 23 July (2:10 pm)	North Adelaide 19.18 (132)	def.	Central District 15.9 (99)	Prospect Oval
Saturday 23 July (2:10 pm)	Port Adelaide 16.8 (104)	def. by	Glenelg 18.10 (118)	Alberton Oval
Saturday 23 July (2:10 pm)	South Adelaide 9.11 (65)	def. by	Norwood 17.11 (113)	Hickinbotham Oval
Bye: Sturt

=== Round 18 ===
	Round 18
Saturday 30 July (2:10 pm)	West Adelaide 8.11 (59)	def. by	North Adelaide 15.10 (100)	Richmond Oval
Saturday 30 July (2:10 pm)	Norwood 14.3 (87)	def.	Port Adelaide 11.9 (75)	Norwood Oval
Saturday 30 July (2:10 pm)	Glenelg 7.13 (55)	def. by	South Adelaide 14.12 (96)	Glenelg Oval
Saturday 6 August (2:10 pm)	Central District 14.8 (92)	def.	Sturt 10.10 (70)	Elizabeth Oval
Bye: Woodville-West Torrens

=== Round 19 ===
	Round 19
Friday 12 August (2:10 pm)	Norwood 10.7 (67)	def.	West Adelaide 7.10 (52)	Norwood Oval
Saturday 13 August (2:10 pm)	Woodville-West Torrens 13.7 (85)	def. by	Central District 15.10 (100)	Woodville Oval
Saturday 13 August (2:10 pm)	Glenelg 21.6 (132)	def.	Sturt 18.11 (119)	Glenelg Oval
Sunday 14 August (2:10 pm)	North Adelaide 18.5 (113)	def.	Port Adelaide 10.19 (79)	Adelaide Oval
Bye: South Adelaide

=== Round 20 ===
	Round 20
Friday 19 August (2:10 pm)	Sturt 14.8 (92)	def. by	Port Adelaide 17.14 (116)	Adelaide Oval
Saturday 20 August (2:10 pm)	South Adelaide 11.5 (71)	def. by	West Adelaide 16.17 (113)	Hickinbotham Oval
Saturday 20 August (2:10 pm)	North Adelaide 12.6 (78)	def. by	Norwood 16.9 (105)	Prospect Oval
Saturday 20 August (2:10 pm)	Woodville-West Torrens 19.11 (125)	def.	Glenelg 2.6 (18)	Woodville Oval
Bye: Central District

=== Round 21 ===
	Round 21
Friday 26 August (2:10 pm)	West Adelaide 10.14 (74)	def. by	Glenelg 13.8 (86)	Richmond Oval
Friday 26 August (2:10 pm)	South Adelaide 8.8 (56)	def. by	Woodville-West Torrens 8.14 (62)	Hickinbotham Oval
Saturday 27 August (2:10 pm)	Sturt 16.15 (111)	def.	North Adelaide 14.19 (103)	Unley Oval
Saturday 27 August (2:10 pm)	Port Adelaide 10.6 (66)	def. by	Central District 16.11 (107)	Alberton Oval
Bye: Norwood

=== Round 22 ===
	Round 22
Saturday 3 September (2:10 pm)	Central District 16.14 (110)	def.	Norwood 9.7 (61)	Elizabeth Oval
Saturday 3 September (2:10 pm)	Woodville-West Torrens 19.12 (126)	def.	West Adelaide 8.7 (55)	Woodville Oval
Saturday 3 September (2:10 pm)	Glenelg 12.13 (85)	def. by	Port Adelaide 18.15 (123)	Glenelg Oval
Saturday 3 September (2:10 pm)	North Adelaide 13.11 (89)	def.	South Adelaide 12.8 (80)	Prospect Oval
Bye: Sturt

=== Round 23 ===
	Round 23
Friday 9 September (2:10 pm)	West Adelaide 14.8 (92)	def.	Sturt 8.13 (61)	Richmond Oval
Saturday 10 September (2:10 pm)	Central District 12.17 (89)	def.	North Adelaide 13.8 (86)	Elizabeth Oval
Saturday 10 September (2:10 pm)	Port Adelaide 8.9 (57)	def. by	Woodville-West Torrens 12.8 (80)	Alberton Oval
Saturday 10 September (2:10 pm)	Norwood 9.16 (70)	def. by	South Adelaide 14.8 (92)	Norwood Oval
Bye: Glenelg

== Ladder ==
2011 SANFL Ladder
Pos	Team	Pld	W	L	D	PF	PA	PP	Pts
1	Central District	20	17	3	0	1988	1510	56.83	34
2	Norwood	20	14	6	0	1776	1430	55.40	28
3	Woodville-West Torrens (P)	20	13	7	0	1658	1362	54.90	26
4	Glenelg	20	9	10	1	1739	2008	46.41	19
5	South Adelaide	20	8	11	1	1606	1876	46.12	17
6	Port Adelaide	20	8	12	0	1653	1694	49.39	16
7	West Adelaide	20	8	12	0	1528	1684	47.57	16
8	North Adelaide	20	7	13	0	1870	1866	50.05	14
9	Sturt	20	5	15	0	1586	1974	44.55	10

Rules for classification: 1) points; 2) percentage; 3) number of points for.
(P) Premiers

== Finals series ==
=== Qualifying and Elimination Finals ===
	Elimination Final
Sunday 18 September (2:10 pm)	South Adelaide 14.17 (101)	def.	Glenelg 12.7 (79)	Football Park (crowd: 9,192)

	Qualifying Final
Sunday 18 September (2:10 pm)	Norwood 17.12 (114)	def.	Woodville-West Torrens 8.5 (53)	Football Park (crowd: 9,192)

=== Semi-finals ===
	First Semi-final
Sunday 25 September (2:10 pm)	Woodville-West Torrens 21.10 (136)	def.	South Adelaide 10.6 (66)	Football Park (crowd: 11,443)

	Second Semi-final
Sunday 25 September (2:10 pm)	Central District 12.5 (77)	def.	Norwood 4.9 (33)	Football Park (crowd: 11,443)

=== Preliminary final ===
	Preliminary Final
Sunday 2 October (2:10 pm)	Woodville-West Torrens 9.13 (67)	def.	Norwood 3.5 (23)	Football Park (crowd: 6,518)

=== Grand Final ===
2011 SANFL Grand Final
Sunday 9 October (2:10 pm)	Central District	def. by	Woodville-West Torrens	Football Park (crowd: 25,234)	Report
1.1 (7); 4.3 (27); 7.8 (50); 11.12 (78)	Q1; Q2; Q3; Final	4.2 (26); 7.6 (48); 11.8 (74); 12.9 (81)	Jack Oatey Medallist: Craig Parry; Television broadcast: ABC
