= Connor Ballenden =

Australian rules footballer

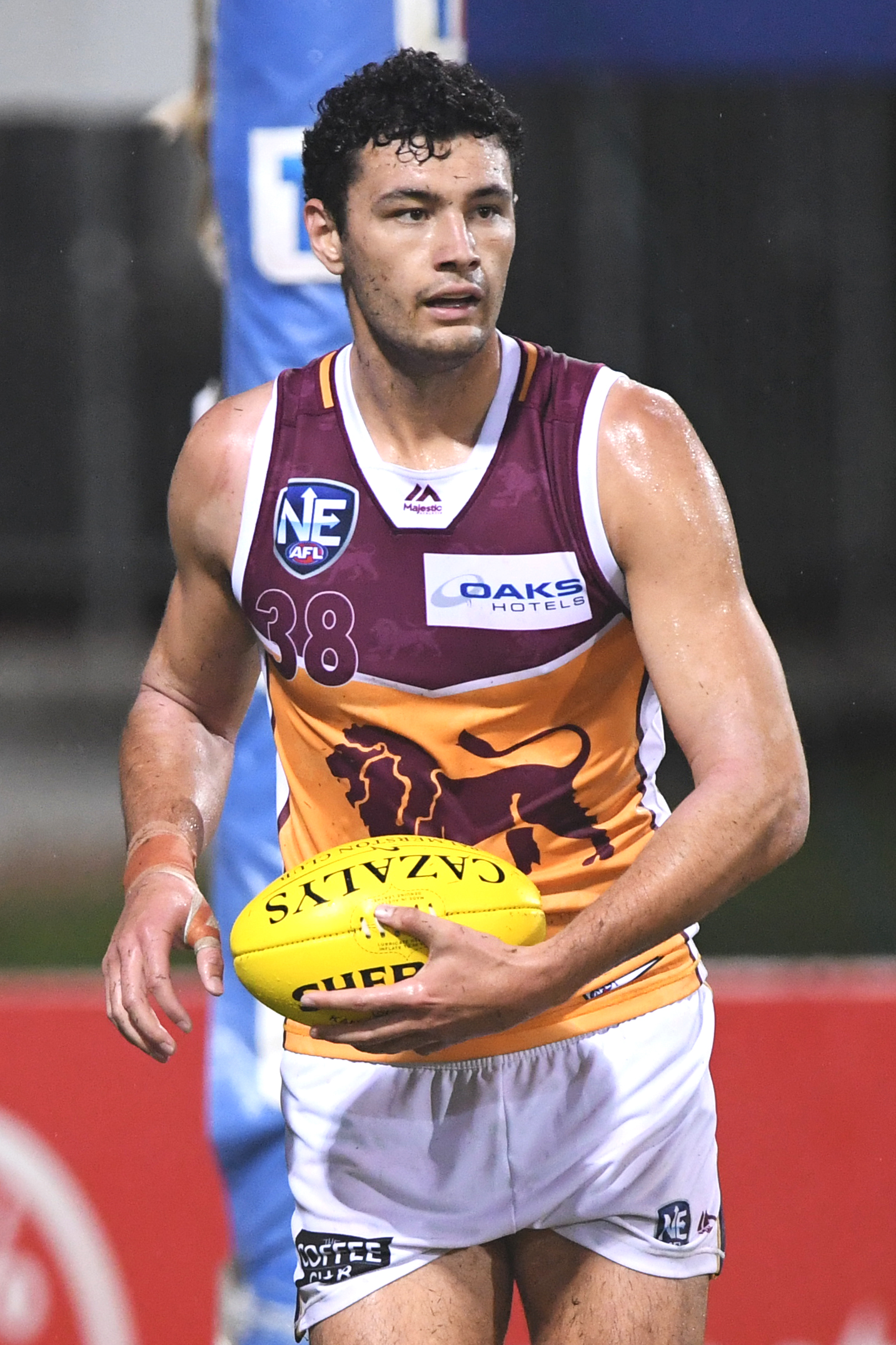
- Ballenden in 2019

Personal information
- Born: 29 March 1999 (age 27)
- Draft: No. 43, 2017 AFL draft, Brisbane Lions
- Debut: 31 July 2020, Brisbane Lions vs. Essendon, at Carrara Stadium
- Height: 200 cm (6 ft 7 in)
- Weight: 101 kg (223 lb)
- Position: Forward

Playing career^{1}
Years	Club	Games (Goals)
2018–2021	Brisbane Lions	3 (1)
- ^{1} Playing statistics correct to the end of Round 14, 2020.

Connor Ballenden (born 29 March 1999) is a former Australian rules footballer who played for the Brisbane Lions in the Australian Football League (AFL). He was recruited by the Brisbane Lions with the 43rd draft pick in the 2017 AFL draft, and he played in three matches until 2021. Ballenden currently plays for Woodville-West Torrens in the South Australian National Football League.

== Early football ==
Connor was born in New Zealand to father Gavin, who represented South Africa in rugby union and mother Gail, who represented New Zealand in athletics. He moved with his family to Australia when he was four. He played junior football for the Kenmore Australian Football Club. Ballenden joined the Brisbane Lions' academy at the age of 12. He also represented the Allies in the AFL Under 18 Championships for the 2016 and 2017 seasons. He completed school at St Joseph's College, Gregory Terrace in 2016.

== AFL career ==
Ballenden debuted in the Brisbane Lions' 63-point win over Essendon in the 9th round of the 2020 AFL season. On debut, Ballenden picked up six disposals, kicked a goal and took three marks. Ballenden was temporarily removed from the senior list in November 2020, with plans to add him back to the rookie list at a later point. Ballenden was delisted at the end of the 2021 AFL season, after playing just 3 career games. After leaving the AFL system he joined SANFL club Woodville-West Torrens.

== Statistics ==
Statistics are correct to the end of 2020

Legend
G	Goals	K	Kicks	D	Disposals	T	Tackles
B	Behinds	H	Handballs	M	Marks

Season	Team	No.	Games	Totals							Averages (per game)						
Season	Team	No.	Games	G	B	K	H	D	M	T	G	B	K	H	D	M	T
2018	Brisbane Lions	38	0	—	—	—	—	—	—	—	—	—	—	—	—	—	—
2019	Brisbane Lions	38	0	—	—	—	—	—	—	—	—	—	—	—	—	—	—
2020 (Note: The 2020 season was played with 17 home-and-away matches per team (down from 22) and 16-minute quarters with time on (down from 20-minute quarters with time on) due to the impact of the COVID-19 pandemic.)	Brisbane Lions	38	2	1	1	5	4	9	5	1	0.5	0.5	2.5	2.0	4.5	2.5	0.5
Career			2	2	1	5	4	9	5	1	0.5	0.5	2.5	2.0	4.5	2.5	0.5
