= 1993 SANFL season =

114th season of the South Australian National Football League

- Teams: 9
- Premiers: Woodville-West Torrens; 1st premiership
- Minor premiers: Woodville-West Torrens; 1st minor premiership
- Magarey Medallist: Brenton Phillips; North Adelaide (20 votes)
- Ken Farmer Medallist: Mark Tylor; Port Adelaide (97 goals)

Attendance
- Matches played: 96
- Total attendance: 446,799 (4,654 per match)
- Highest: 42,719 (Grand Final, Woodville-West Torrens vs. Norwood)

The 1993 SANFL season was the 114th season of the South Australian National Football League, the highest-level Australian rules football competition in South Australia.

Woodville-West Torrens won their first premiership, just two years after the team was created from the merger of Woodville and West Torrens.

== Ladder ==
1993 SANFL ladder
Pos	Team	Pld	W	L	D	PF	PA	PP	Pts
1	Woodville-West Torrens (P)	20	15	4	1	2300	1717	57.26	31
2	Port Adelaide	20	15	5	0	2553	2155	54.23	30
3	Glenelg	20	12	7	1	2370	2003	54.20	25
4	Norwood	20	12	8	0	2261	1962	53.54	24
5	Central District	20	12	8	0	2180	1914	53.25	24
6	South Adelaide	20	9	11	0	2127	2046	50.97	18
7	North Adelaide	20	6	14	0	1657	2269	42.21	12
8	West Adelaide	20	4	16	0	1733	2327	42.68	8
9	Sturt	20	4	16	0	1858	2646	41.25	8

Rules for classification: 1) points; 2) percentage; 3) number of points for
(P) Premiers

== Finals ==
=== Grand Final ===
1993 SANFL Grand Final
Saturday, 2 October	Woodville-West Torrens	def.	Norwood	Football Park (crowd: 42,719)
5.7 (37); 12.9 (81); 13.14 (92); 17.20 (122)	Q1; Q2; Q3; Final	2.2 (14); 3.4 (22); 5.7 (37); 7.7 (49)
