= 2020 SANFL season =

- Teams: 8
- Premiers: Woodville-West Torrens; 4th premiership
- Minor premiers: Woodville-West Torrens; 8th minor premiership
- Magarey Medallist: Campbell Combe; North Adelaide (19 votes)
- Highest: 17,038 (Grand Final, North Adelaide vs Woodville-West Torrens)

The 2020 South Australian National Football League season (officially the SANFL Statewide Super League) was the 141st season of the South Australian National Football League (SANFL), the highest-level Australian rules football competition in South Australia. The season was originally scheduled to run from April 2020 until September 2020; however its commencement was delayed to June 2020 due to the COVID-19 pandemic. The number of clubs participating in the season was reduced to eight, as Adelaide and Port Adelaide were barred from fielding their reserves teams by the Australian Football League.

== Impact of COVID-19 pandemic ==
The 2020 season was disrupted by the COVID-19 pandemic, which was formally declared a pandemic on 11 March 2020, three weeks prior to the scheduled start of the premiership season. Governmental restrictions on non-essential public gatherings greater than 500 people meant that, as a minimum, matches would need to be played before empty stadiums, as was planned for the Australian Football League; however, it was announced on 16 March that SANFL season was suspended indefinitely. A shortened season may still be played commencing no earlier than 31 May, depending on the status of the pandemic; no decision has yet been made on whether the season will be cancelled entirely, but this remains a possibility in the event of a prolonged pandemic. South Australia's two AFL clubs, Adelaide and Port Adelaide, did not field teams as the AFL issued an order banning its clubs from fielding AFL-listed players in state leagues. On 14 June 2020, the first two rounds of the revised fixture were announced, with all games in those rounds to be played at Adelaide Oval.

== Premiership Season ==
=== Round 1 ===
	Round 1
Saturday 27 June (11:50 am)	Central District 5.6 (36)	def. by	Sturt 8.3 (51)	Adelaide Oval (crowd: 3,542)
Saturday 27 June (2:40 pm)	Woodville-West Torrens 10.8 (68)	def. by	South Adelaide 11.8 (74)	Adelaide Oval (crowd: 3,542)
Sunday 28 June (12:00 pm)	North Adelaide 15.6 (96)	def.	West Adelaide 10.7 (67)	Adelaide Oval (crowd: 3,907)
Sunday 28 June (3:05 pm)	Glenelg 11.10 (76)	def.	Norwood 10.13 (73)	Adelaide Oval (crowd: 3,907)

=== Round 2 ===
	Round 2
Saturday 4 July (12:05 pm)	Sturt 6.9 (45)	def. by	Woodville-West Torrens 14.12 (96)	Adelaide Oval (crowd: 3,964)
Saturday 4 July (3:05 pm)	Norwood 8.13 (61)	def. by	North Adelaide 9.9 (63)	Adelaide Oval (crowd: 3,964)
Sunday 5 July (11:50 am)	South Adelaide 14.8 (92)	def. by	Glenelg 15.7 (97)	Adelaide Oval
Sunday 5 July (2:40 pm)	West Adelaide 12.14 (86)	drew with	Central District 13.8 (86)	Adelaide Oval

=== Round 3 ===
	Round 3
Saturday 11 July (11:45 am)	Central District 5.4 (34)	def. by	South Adelaide 11.12 (78)	Elizabeth Oval (crowd: 1,000)
Saturday 11 July (2:10 pm)	Glenelg 11.5 (71)	def. by	North Adelaide 10.14 (74)	Glenelg Oval (crowd: 750)
Sunday 12 July (2:10 pm)	Woodville-West Torrens 14.12 (96)	def.	Norwood 4.7 (31)	Woodville Oval (crowd: 750)
Sunday 12 July (2:10 pm)	Sturt 11.6 (72)	def.	West Adelaide 9.10 (64)	Unley Oval (crowd: 950)

=== Round 4 ===
	Round 4
Saturday 18 July (1:10 pm)	North Adelaide 7.12 (54)	def. by	Woodville-West Torrens 10.9 (69)	Prospect Oval (crowd: 950)
Saturday 18 July (2:05 pm)	West Adelaide 10.4 (64)	def.	Glenelg 7.6 (48)	Richmond Oval (crowd: 900)
Saturday 18 July (2:10 pm)	Norwood 15.14 (104)	def.	Central District 12.14 (86)	Norwood Oval (crowd: 750)
Saturday 18 July (2:10 pm)	South Adelaide 10.10 (70)	def.	Sturt 7.5 (47)	Hickinbotham Oval (crowd: 750)

=== Round 5 ===
	Round 5
Saturday 25 July (2:05 pm)	Glenelg 12.11 (83)	def. by	Woodville-West Torrens 16.7 (103)	Glenelg Oval (crowd: 831)
Saturday 25 July (2:10 pm)	South Adelaide 12.7 (79)	def.	West Adelaide 9.5 (59)	Hickinbotham Oval (crowd: 946)
Saturday 25 July (2:10 pm)	Central District 9.8 (62)	def. by	North Adelaide 14.8 (92)	Elizabeth Oval (crowd: 941)
Sunday 26 July (2:10 pm)	Sturt 10.13 (73)	def. by	Norwood 13.10 (88)	Unley Oval (crowd: 1,825)

=== Round 6 ===
	Round 6
Saturday 1 August (2:10 pm)	Woodville-West Torrens 11.13 (79)	def.	Central District 7.7 (49)	Woodville Oval (crowd: 1,548)
Saturday 1 August (2:10 pm)	West Adelaide 8.9 (57)	def. by	Norwood 19.10 (124)	Richmond Oval (crowd: 1,635)
Saturday 1 August (2:10 pm)	North Adelaide 9.12 (66)	def.	South Adelaide 8.10 (58)	Prospect Oval (crowd: 1,662)
Sunday 2 August (2:05 pm)	Glenelg 12.10 (82)	def.	Sturt 8.16 (64)	Glenelg Oval (crowd: 3,004)

=== Round 7 ===
	Round 7
Saturday 8 August (1:35 pm)	Woodville-West Torrens 11.12 (78)	def.	West Adelaide 4.6 (30)	Woodville Oval (crowd: 1,119)
Saturday 8 August (2:10 pm)	Central District 11.5 (71)	def. by	Glenelg 15.14 (104)	Elizabeth Oval (crowd: 991)
Saturday 8 August (2:10 pm)	North Adelaide 8.14 (62)	def.	Sturt 6.7 (43)	Prospect Oval (crowd: 1,825)
Sunday 9 August (2:10 pm)	Norwood 10.10 (70)	def.	South Adelaide 9.12 (66)	Norwood Oval (crowd: 1,847)

=== Round 8 ===
	Round 8
Friday 14 August (7:20 pm)	West Adelaide 11.9 (75)	def. by	North Adelaide 11.10 (76)	Richmond Oval (crowd: 1,242)
Saturday 15 August (2:05 pm)	South Adelaide 6.15 (51)	def. by	Woodville-West Torrens 11.6 (72)	Hickinbotham Oval (crowd: 1,115)
Saturday 15 August (2:10 pm)	Sturt 16.11 (107)	def.	Central District 5.12 (42)	Unley Oval (crowd: 1,371)
Saturday 15 August (7:20 pm)	Norwood 5.11 (41)	def. by	Glenelg 10.14 (74)	Norwood Oval

=== Round 9 ===
	Round 9
Saturday 22 August (1:35 pm)	North Adelaide 15.13 (103)	def.	Norwood 8.3 (51)	Prospect Oval (crowd: 1,651)
Saturday 22 August (2:10 pm)	Glenelg 8.2 (50)	def. by	South Adelaide 13.13 (91)	Glenelg Oval (crowd: 1,448)
Saturday 22 August (2:10 pm)	Woodville-West Torrens 11.6 (72)	def.	Sturt 5.5 (35)	Woodville Oval (crowd: 1,337)
Saturday 22 August (2:10 pm)	Central District 10.13 (73)	def.	West Adelaide 8.3 (51)	Elizabeth Oval (crowd: 1,083)

=== Round 10 ===
	Round 10
Friday 28 August (7:20 pm)	West Adelaide 8.6 (54)	def. by	Sturt 10.1 (61)	Richmond Oval (crowd: 1,505)
Friday 28 August (7:40 pm)	Norwood 12.12 (84)	def.	Woodville-West Torrens 6.8 (44)	Norwood Oval (crowd: 2,068)
Saturday 29 August (2:10 pm)	South Adelaide 14.19 (103)	def.	Central District 10.6 (66)	Hickinbotham Oval (crowd: 1,034)
Sunday 30 August (2:10 pm)	North Adelaide 10.9 (69)	def. by	Glenelg 10.11 (71)	Prospect Oval

=== Round 11 ===
	Round 11
Saturday 5 September (2:10 pm)	Central District 15.8 (98)	def.	Norwood 13.7 (85)	Elizabeth Oval (crowd: 1,573)
Saturday 5 September (2:10 pm)	Sturt 11.14 (80)	def.	South Adelaide 7.5 (47)	Unley Oval (crowd: 1,178)
Saturday 5 September (4:10 pm)	Glenelg 21.9 (135)	def.	West Adelaide 8.13 (61)	Glenelg Oval (crowd: 2,109)
Sunday 6 September (2:10 pm)	Woodville-West Torrens 10.9 (69)	def.	North Adelaide 6.8 (44)	Woodville Oval (crowd: 2,188)

=== Round 12 ===
	Round 12
Friday 11 September (7:20 pm)	West Adelaide 8.7 (55)	def. by	South Adelaide 17.13 (115)	Richmond Oval
Friday 11 September (7:40 pm)	Norwood 10.16 (76)	def.	Sturt 11.7 (73)	Norwood Oval (crowd: 2,700)
Saturday 12 September (1:45 pm)	Woodville-West Torrens 16.15 (111)	def.	Glenelg 4.9 (33)	Woodville Oval (crowd: 1,399)
Saturday 12 September (2:10 pm)	North Adelaide 15.20 (110)	def.	Central District 12.6 (78)	Prospect Oval (crowd: 1,692)

=== Round 13 ===
	Round 13
Friday 18 September (7:20 pm)	West Adelaide 5.4 (34)	def. by	Woodville-West Torrens 16.14 (110)	Richmond Oval
Saturday 19 September (2:10 pm)	South Adelaide 17.14 (116)	def.	Norwood 6.6 (42)	Hickinbotham Oval (crowd: 1,146)
Saturday 19 September (2:10 pm)	Sturt 8.6 (54)	def. by	North Adelaide 12.13 (85)	Unley Oval (crowd: 1,165)
Saturday 19 September (4:10 pm)	Glenelg 11.11 (77)	def.	Central District 10.16 (76)	Glenelg Oval (crowd: 1,362)

=== Round 14 ===
	Round 14
Friday 25 September (7:40 pm)	Norwood 6.11 (47)	def. by	West Adelaide 8.9 (57)	Norwood Oval
Saturday 26 September (2:10 pm)	Sturt 9.13 (67)	def. by	Glenelg 12.8 (80)	Unley Oval (crowd: 1,224)
Saturday 26 September (2:10 pm)	Central District 13.10 (88)	def.	Woodville-West Torrens 13.6 (84)	Elizabeth Oval (crowd: 1,671)
Sunday 27 September (2:10 pm)	South Adelaide 13.9 (87)	def.	North Adelaide 6.9 (45)	Hickinbotham Oval (crowd: 1,609)

== Ladder ==
2020 SANFL Ladder
Pos	Team	Pld	W	L	D	PF	PA	PP	Pts
1	Woodville-West Torrens	14	11	3	0	1151	735	61.03	22
2	North Adelaide	14	10	4	0	1039	916	53.15	20
3	South Adelaide	14	9	5	0	1127	851	56.98	18
4	Glenelg	14	9	5	0	1081	1057	50.56	18
5	Norwood	14	6	8	0	977	1082	47.45	12
6	Sturt	14	5	9	0	872	954	47.75	10
7	Central District	14	3	10	1	945	1211	43.83	7
8	West Adelaide	14	2	11	1	814	1200	40.42	5

Rules for classification: 1) points; 2) percentage; 3) number of points for.

== Finals series ==
=== Semi-finals ===
	First Semi-final
Sunday 4 October (12:15 pm)	South Adelaide 14.12 (96)	def.	Glenelg 10.11 (71)	Adelaide Oval (crowd: See below)

	Second Semi-final
Sunday 4 October (3:15 pm)	Woodville-West Torrens 9.8 (62)	def. by	North Adelaide 11.11 (77)	Adelaide Oval (crowd: 5,409)

=== Preliminary final ===
	Preliminary Final
Sunday 11 October (3:15 pm)	Woodville-West Torrens 16.15 (111)	def.	South Adelaide 10.8 (68)	Adelaide Oval (crowd: 5,110)

=== Grand Final ===
2020 SANFL Grand Final
Sunday 18 October (3:00 pm)	North Adelaide	def. by	Woodville-West Torrens	Adelaide Oval (crowd: 17,038)
3.4.22; 4.4.28; 5.6.36; 7.6.48	Q1; Q2; Q3; Final	1.1.7; 10.3.63; 12.8.80; 13.9.87	Umpires: Bowen, Harris, Hundtermark; Jack Oatey Medal: Jordan Foote; Television broadcast: Seven Network

== Awards ==
=== Club best and fairest ===
Club	Award	Player	Ref.
Central District	Norm Russell Medal	James Boyd	
Glenelg	John H. Ellers Best and Fairest	Matthew Snook	
North Adelaide	Barrie Robran Club Champion	Campbell Combe	
Norwood	Michael Taylor Medal	Brad McKenzie & Richard Douglas	
South Adelaide	Knuckey Cup	Matthew Broadbent	
Sturt	P. T. Morton Medal	James Battersby	
West Adelaide	Neil Kerley Medal	Isaac Johnson	
Woodville-West Torrens	Perce Johns Medal	Joseph Sinor	
