= Bruce Winter (footballer) =

Personal information
- Born: 18 April 1953 (age 73); Port Moresby, Papua New Guinea
- Original team: Norwood High School

Playing career
Years	Club	Games (Goals)
1971–1978	Sturt	175 (83)
1979–1986	Norwood	178 (75)
Total		353 (158)

Representative team honours
Years	Team	Games (Goals)
1977–1978	South Australia	2 (?)

Coaching career
Years	Club	Games (W–L–D)
1993–1997	Woodville-West Torrens	110 (62–47–1)

Career highlights
- 3× SANFL Premiership player: (1974, 1982, 1984); SANFL Premiership coach: (1993); South Australian Football Hall of Fame, inducted 2010

D. Bruce Winter (born 18 April 1953) is a former Australian rules footballer who played for the Norwood Football Club and the Sturt Football Club in the South Australian National Football League (SANFL). He also coached Woodville-West Torrens.

Outside of football, Winter worked as a microbiologist at the Institute of Medical and Veterinary Science.
