= Paul Hamilton (Australian footballer) =

Australian rules footballer

Personal information
- Full name: Paul Hamilton
- Born: 19 June 1967 (age 59)
- Original team: St Bernards
- Height: 189 cm (6 ft 2 in)
- Weight: 93 kg (205 lb)
- Position: Defender

Playing career^{1}
Years	Club	Games (Goals)
1986–1992	Essendon	105 (7)
- ^{1} Playing statistics correct to the end of 1992.

Paul Hamilton (born 19 June 1967) is a former Australian rules footballer who played with Essendon in the Victorian Football League (VFL) and Australian Football League (AFL) during the late 1980s and early 1990s.

== Career ==
Hamilton was a defender and usually occupied a back pocket for Essendon. After playing in a Preliminary Final in 1989, Hamilton participated in the 1990 AFL Grand Final. He brought up his 100th league game in Essendon's 1991 encounter against Carlton Football Club at Waverley Park.

Hamilton left Essendon after the 1992 AFL season for Tasmania where he coached Glenorchy Football Club to a premiership. Hamilton then crossed to South Australian National Football League (SANFL) club Woodville-West Torrens where he had some more success, steering them to a minor premiership. Hamilton then served as an assistant coach at North Melbourne Football Club for fours years as well as having a stint as an assistant to Neil Craig at the Adelaide Football Club. In 2008 he returned to Essendon to fill the role of General Manager.
