= Justin Cicolella =

Australian rules footballer, born 1978

Personal information
- Full name: Justin Cicolella
- Born: 12 September 1978 (age 48)
- Original team: Woodville-West Torrens
- Height: 178 cm (5 ft 10 in)
- Weight: 78 kg (172 lb)

Playing career^{1}
Years	Club	Games (Goals)
2000	Adelaide	5 (1)
1998–2012	Woodville-West Torrens	266 (179)
- ^{1} Playing statistics correct to the end of 2000.

Justin Cicolella (born 12 September 1978) is an Australian rules footballer who played for the Adelaide Crows in the Australian Football League in 2000. He played with the Woodville-West Torrens Football Club (the Eagles) in the South Australian National Football League and was acting captain of their 2006 premiership side, as well as a member of the 2011 premiership side.
