= Mark Tylor =

Australian rules footballer

Personal information
- Full name: Mark Tylor
- Nickname: Tyles
- Position: Forward

Playing career
Years	Club	Games (Goals)
1985–1995	Port Adelaide	167 (380)
1996	Glenelg	15 (30)
1997	Port Adelaide	7 (15)

Career highlights
- Port Adelaide premiership player (1994); 2x SANFL leading goal-kicker (1992, 1993); 3x Port Adelaide leading goal-kicker (1992, 1993, 1995); 2x SANFL Team of the Year; North Haven premiership coach (2017)

Mark Tylor is a former Australian rules footballer who played in the South Australian National Football League (SANFL) for both the Port Adelaide Football Club and Glenelg Football Club. He played in the 1994 Port Adelaide premiership team and led the club's goal-kicking on three occasions, as well as winning the Ken Farmer Medal in two of those years.

Tylor broke his hand late in the 1992 season, leaving him stranded on 97 goals for the season (his highest season tally) and missing out on the 1992 SANFL Grand Final. Despite missing the last few games of the season, Tylor won the Ken Farmer Medal. Tylor won the Ken Farmer Medal again in 1993, kicking 90 goals.

In 1996 he switched to Glenelg, playing 15 games and kicking 30 goals, before switching back to Port Adelaide for the 1997, his last in the SANFL.
