= Scott Morphett =

Australian rules footballer

Personal information
- Full name: Scott Morphett
- Born: 24 March 1965 (age 61)
- Original team: Hay (NSW)
- Height: 185 cm (6 ft 1 in)
- Weight: 85 kg (187 lb)
- Position: Full-forward

Playing career^{1}
| Years | Club | Games (Goals) |
| 1985 | Geelong | 1 (1) |
| 1991–96 | Woodville-West Torrens | ? (306) |
- ^{1} Playing statistics correct to the end of 1985.

Scott Morphett (born 24 March 1965) is a former Australian rules footballer who played for Geelong in the Victorian Football League (VFL) and Woodville-West Torrens in the South Australian National Football League (SANFL).

Morphett had to wait until the final round of the 1985 VFL season, against Fitzroy at Victoria Park, to make his debut. Geelong won the game by 23 points, and Morphett kicked a goal.

He was let go by the club without adding to his one appearance, and he ended up at West Torrens, with whom he was the Best and Fairest winner in 1989. His club merged with Woodville to form Woodville-West Torrens in 1991, and he took out their inaugural Club Champion award. This was on the back of his Ken Farmer Medal–winning season up forward, where he kicked 99 goals to top the league's goal-kicking. Morphett was again the club's leading goalkicker the following season after kicking 52 goals. He is the full-forward in the official Woodville-West Torrens 'Team of the Decade'.
