= 2006 SANFL Grand Final =

| Central District | Woodville-West Torrens |
|---|---|
| 7.3 (45) | 17.19 (121) |
| | 1 | 2 | 3 | 4 |
|---|---|---|---|---|
| CD | 2.1 (13) | 3.1 (19) | 4.1 (25) | 7.3 (45) |
| WWT | 3.8 (26) | 5.10 (40) | 12.15 (87) | 17.19 (121) |
- Date: 8 October 2006
- Stadium: Football Park
- Attendance: 25,130
- Umpires: Fila, Pfeiffer, Williams

The 2006 South Australian National Football League (SANFL) Grand Final saw the Woodville-West Torrens defeat the Central District Bulldogs by 76 points to claim the club's second premiership victory.

The match was played on Sunday 8 October 2006 at Football Park in front of a crowd of 25,130.
