= Andrew Payze =

Australian rules footballer (born 1966)

Personal information
- Full name: Andrew John Payze
- Born: 25 August 1966 (age 60)
- Draft: No. 9, 1986 national draft
- Height: 178 cm (5 ft 10 in)
- Weight: 78 kg (172 lb)
- Position: Wingman

Playing career^{1}
Years	Club	Games (Goals)
1984–90	West Torrens	159 (118)
1991–92	Adelaide	14 (2)
1991–98	Woodville-West Torrens	149 (103)
Total		322 (223)

Representative team honours
Years	Team	Games (Goals)
1984–98	South Australia	6 (5)
- ^{1} Playing statistics correct to the end of 1998.

Career highlights
- 1993 Woodville-West Torrens premiership

Andrew Payze (born 25 August 1966) is a former professional Australian rules footballer who played for the Adelaide Football Club in the Australian Football League (AFL). He also had a long career at the West Torrens Football Club and Woodville-West Torrens Football Club in the South Australian National Football League (SANFL).

Payze was a runner up in the Magarey Medal and won the West Torrens 'Best and Fairest' award in 1986. He was then picked up by Essendon with the ninth pick in the 1986 VFL draft but returned to South Australia after being unable to break into the seniors. A wingman, he represented South Australia at the 1988 Adelaide Bicentennial Carnival and played six times in all for his state during his career, included a match as captain in 1994.

After another attempt to launch an AFL career, at Richmond, Payze became a foundation player at the Adelaide Crows when they joined the competition in 1991. He however could only manage 14 appearances and continued in the SANFL, with the newly formed Woodville-West Torrens, with whom he was a premiership winner in 1993. By the time he retired in 1998, Payze had amassed 308 SANFL games and kicked 233 goals. He is a life member, life governor and wingman in the Woodville-West Torrens official 'Team of the Decade'.

Andrew Payze is now a development coach for St Peter's Old Collegians Football Club in the Adelaide Footy League. For work, he is an Associate Director at Morton Philips, Adelaide's premier Executive Search Firm.
