= Steven Sziller =

Australian rules footballer

Personal information
- Born: 15 December 1972 (age 53)
- Original team: Woodville-West Torrens (SANFL)
- Debut: Round 1, 1995, St Kilda vs. West Coast, at the WACA Ground
- Height: 176 cm (5 ft 9 in)
- Weight: 81 kg (179 lb)

Playing career^{1}
Years	Club	Games (Goals)
1995–2000	St Kilda	118 (38)
2001–2002	Richmond	38 (3)
Total		156 (41)
- ^{1} Playing statistics correct to the end of 2002.

Steven Sziller (born 15 December 1972) is a former Australian rules footballer who played for St Kilda and Richmond in the Australian Football League (AFL). He also represented South Australia in a State of Origin game.

Before Sziller arrived at St Kilda he had had a brief but successful career in the South Australian National Football League (SANFL) with Woodville-West Torrens. In 1993 he played in their inaugural premiership team and won the Jack Oatey Medal for 'Best on Ground'. The following season he was the club's Best and fairest winner and attracted the attention of St Kilda who recruited him as the 25th pick in the 1994 National Draft.

Sziller usually played in defence for the Saints but could play forward and as a tagger. He was an inaccurate shot at goal, with 55 behinds for his 41 career goals although he did kick six goals – two in a game against Sydney at the SCG in 1998. After being de-listed at the end of 2000 he was picked up by Richmond who were coached by his former teammate Danny Frawley. He spent two seasons with Richmond, including playing in the 2001 Preliminary Final.

After retiring from the AFL, Sziller played at East Burwood Rams in the Eastern Football League and then at St Pauls in the Southern Football League.
