= 2020 SANFL Grand Final =

North Adelaide	Woodville-West Torrens
7.6 (48)	13.9 (87)
	1	2	3	4
NA	3.4 (22)	4.4 (28)	5.6 (36)	7.6 (48)
WWT	1.1 (7)	10.3 (63)	12.8 (80)	13.9 (87)
- Date: 18 October, 3:00pm
- Stadium: Adelaide Oval
- Attendance: 17,038 (crowd numbers restricted due to Covid-19 Pandemic)
- Umpires: Bowen, Harris, Hundertmark

Accolades
- Jack Oatey Medallist: Jordan Foote

Broadcast in Australia
- Network: Seven Network

The 2020 South Australian National Football League (SANFL) grand final was an Australian rules football match played at the Adelaide Oval on Sunday, 18 October to determine the premiers for the 2020 SANFL season.

The match was contested by North Adelaide and Woodville-West Torrens in the first grand final meeting between the two teams, although North Adelaide did play West Torrens in the 1949 SANFL Grand Final.

Woodville-West Torrens won the grand final, defeating North Adelaide by 39 points, and claiming their fourth premiership and their first since 2011. Woodville-West Torrens midfielder Jordan Foote was awarded the Jack Oatey Medal as the best player on the ground.
