= Andrew Taylor (Australian footballer) =

Australian rules footballer (born 1965)

Personal information
- Full name: Andrew Taylor
- Born: 2 July 1965 (age 61)
- Original team: Albion (WRFL)
- Height: 187 cm (6 ft 2 in)
- Weight: 88 kg (194 lb)

Playing career^{1}
Years	Club	Games (Goals)
1983	Footscray	1 (0)
1988–1991	Brisbane Bears	31 (13)
Total		32 (13)
- ^{1} Playing statistics correct to the end of 1991.

Career highlights
- Brisbane Bears reserves premiership 1991

Andrew Taylor (born 2 July 1965) is a former Australian rules footballer who played with Footscray and the Brisbane Bears in the Victorian/Australian Football League (VFL/AFL), and Woodville and Woodville West Torrens in the South Australian National Football League.

Taylor was a successful junior footballer in the Footscray District League with Albion and won three 'best and fairest' awards. He appeared for Footscray at Under-19 level and broke into the seniors in the 1983 VFL season when he played a game against Geelong. It would however be the only time he played at VFL level for Footscray and he moved to South Australia where he spent a period of time with the Woodville Football Club.

He received another chance to play VFL football when he was picked up by the Brisbane Bears. In 1988 he received three Brownlow Medal votes for a 23-disposal effort against Carlton. The following season he was involved in an on-field incident with Danny Frawley for which the former Woodville player was suspended for three weeks for striking and another report of eye gouging was thrown out. He was a member of Brisbane's reserves premiership team in 1991, as a half forward flanker.

Upon leaving Brisbane, Taylor returned to the SANFL and signed up with Woodville-West Torrens. He topped their goal-kicking three times, with his best season tallies being 74 goals in 1993 and 61 goals in 1994. His performances in 1993 helped the club win the premiership and in 1994 he kicked a club record 12 goals in a game against North Adelaide. For his contributions up forward during their early years, Taylor was named as the centre-half-forward in the Woodville-West Torrens 'Team of the Decade'.
