= Andrew Rogers (footballer) =

Australian rules footballer

Personal information
- Born: 15 August 1964 (age 62); Port Pirie, South Australia
- Original team: Risdon
- Draft: No. 6, 1987 national draft No. 6, 1989 pre-season draft
- Debut: Round 1, 1988, Essendon vs. North Melbourne, at Windy Hill
- Height: 188 cm (6 ft 2 in)
- Weight: 90 kg (198 lb)

Playing career^{1}
Years	Club	Games (Goals)
1985–1986	Woodville	63 (2)
1988	Essendon	8 (1)
1989–1992	Geelong	75 (2)
1993–2001	Woodville-West Torrens	179 (25)
- ^{1} Playing statistics correct to the end of 2001.

Career highlights
- All-Australian team: 1987; Woodville-West Torrens premiership player: 1993; Woodville-West Torrens best and fairest: 1993, 1995 & 1996; Woodville-West Torrens captain 1995-2000; South Australian Football Hall of Fame inductee

Andrew Rogers (born 15 August 1964) is a former Australian rules footballer who played with Essendon and Geelong in the VFL/AFL.

Originally from South Australian National Football League (SANFL) club Woodville, Rogers was recruited by Essendon with pick six in the 1987 VFL Draft. He had played 63 games at Woodville from his debut in 1985 and in 1987 represented South Australia in interstate matches against Victoria and Western Australia, performing well enough to be selected in the All-Australian team.

Rogers made eight senior appearances for Essendon in 1988 but after being unable to cement his place in the side crossed to Geelong. He was at Geelong for four seasons, playing finals football, including the 1992 AFL Grand Final which they lost and was to be his last game in the league.

When he returned to South Australia in 1993 he rejoined his old club Woodville who, while Rogers was in the AFL, had merged to become Woodville-West Torrens. As vice-captain, Rogers played in their inaugural premiership team that year, with a Grand Final victory over Norwood. He was club captain from 1995 to 2000 and just like with his AFL stint, his SANFL career ended in a losing Grand Final. The 2001 decider was his 179th and last game for the merged club, for whom he won 'best and fairests' in 1993, 1995 and 1996.

Rogers coached North Shore Australian Football Club in the Sydney AFL competition in 2022 and 2023, taking the Bombers to the Grand Final in both seasons at the helm; but it would be two more losing Grand Finals.
