= Woodville-West Torrens Football Club =

Australian rules football club

Woodville-West Torrens

Names
- Full name: Woodville-West Torrens Football Club
- Nickname: Eagles

2026 season
- Home-and-away season: 3rd
- Leading goalkicker: Connor Ballenden (39)
- Best and fairest: Ted Clohesy

Club details
- Founded: 1991; 35 years ago
- Colours: Blue, green and gold
- Competition: South Australian National Football League
- Coach: Luke Barmby (from 2027)
- Captain(s): James Rowe & Riley Knight
- Premierships: SANFL (5): 1993, 2006, 2011, 2020, 2021; SANFLW (1): 2026
- Grounds: Woodville Oval (capacity: 15,000)
- Eastern Parade (capacity: 8,000)

Uniforms
Home

Other information
- Official website: wwtfc.com.au

Woodville-West Torrens Football Club is an Australian rules football club playing in the South Australian National Football League (SANFL). The club was formed in 1990 from a merger of the neighbouring Woodville and West Torrens football clubs and played its inaugural game in 1991. Since 1993, the Eagles have played most of their home games at Woodville's home ground of Woodville Oval, having previously used Football Park.

== History ==
West Torrens had competed in the SANFL since the 1895 SAFA season, when it was originally known as the Port Natives (who wore Blue and Gold) and renamed to West Torrens for the 1897 SAFA season, while Woodville entered the competition for 1964 SANFL season. However, a third western suburbs team in the competition West Adelaide proved too much to handle with both sides struggling on the field following Woodville's inception.

Heading into 1964, West Torrens had won four premierships in the previous forty seasons, and were a highly competitive club, regular finalists, and played off in 8 Grand Finals - the last one being the 1953 victory over Port Adelaide.

Woodville did not win a premiership or play in a grand final in their twenty-seven seasons (1964–90), usually being close to or on the bottom of the ladder. West Torrens were also dragged down to this level by the 1970s.

Whispers had grown throughout SA football circles that a merger would save these clubs throughout the 1980s. Public figure and talkshow radio host Robert Al Forno reported in 1987 that if the merger ended up happening, he would eat his hat. Network Seven also aired a story in late 1989 on local fan Tony 'T-Bone', who had stated that if the merge happened, he would riot and attempt to hold up traffic in Adelaide's CBD.

In 1990, the imminent admission of the Adelaide Crows into the AFL placed both club's futures as separate entities in serious doubt: West Torrens was technically insolvent, with debts of $1.1 million, and while Woodville was financially viable, club officials realised that it would be difficult, if not impossible, for the club to be competitive in the foreseeable future.

It was decided at the end of the season to merge the two sides to form the Woodville-West Torrens Eagles, effectively returning to how things were prior to 1964. The club would play their home games at Woodville's home ground, Woodville Oval, and use the West Torrens Eagle emblem. The new club proved immediately competitive, and won their first premiership in 1993.

In accepting the Thomas Seymour Hill Trophy for the first time for the Eagles, captain Peter Schwarz jubilantly proclaimed:

"This is a very sweet moment – the result of two clubs that made a lot of tough decisions three years ago. This is for Woodville and for West Torrens. Now we are one club."

The club colours of blue, gold and green incorporate the club colours of West Torrens (blue and gold) and Woodville (green and gold). The Eagle logo of the West Torrens Football Club was adopted as the official emblem of Woodville West Torrens. It was also agreed that blue would be the primary colour of the merged club.

It took 27 years, but order was finally restored for SANFL clubs in the western suburbs in 1991.

By 2018, the Woodville-West Torrens Football Club officially surpassed Woodville's total existence as it entered its 28th SANFL season, and interestingly, the club's on-field record read very similar to that of West Torrens prior to Woodville entering the competition in 1964.

Woodville-West Torrens entered a team in the SANFL Women's League in 2019 and, as of 2021 SANFL season, are the only club to have never won a wooden spoon

=== Premierships ===
After having merged only 3 years prior, Woodville-West Torrens claimed the Thomas Seymour Hill Trophy, with a convincing 73-point victory over Norwood. It would, however, prove to be the Eagles only premiership success during 1994–2005 in which they lost 5 Grand Finals – 1994 to Port Adelaide and 2000, 2001, 2004 and 2005 all to Central District. After losing yet another Grand Final to their arch-rivals in 2005, the Eagles bounced back and got their first premiership in 13 years, and after 6 attempts, with a thumping 76-point victory over the Bulldogs.

In 2011, the Eagles became the only club since the turn of the century to defeat Central District in two grand finals, with a thrilling 3-point win – 81 to 78 on 9 October 2011. The Eagles went in as the underdogs but coach Michael Godden (in only his second year with the team and in a senior coaching position) believed his Eagles could overcome the Dogs.

Ruckman Craig Parry was named the Jack Oatey Medalist for Best on Ground for 2011.

Godden became the third coach to win a Premiership for Woodville-West Torrens, following Bruce Winter (1993) and Ron Fuller (2006). He became the second to win one at his first attempt (Winter 1993).

The Eagles became the first side to win the Premiership from a Qualifying Final loss since Sturt did so in 1976, and the only club in the competition to have won Premierships in each of the last 3 decades.

In 2015 the Woodville West Torrens Football Club celebrated their 25th season in the SANFL, and dominated the competition in U/18s, Reserves and League, taking out each Minor Premiership (the only club to ever do so) dropping just 4 games across all 3 grades throughout the minor round season. The league team with a 16–2 record from their 18 games.

Each club progressed straight through to their respective Grand Finals, and the Reserves completed a remarkable undefeated season (first team to do so since West Torrens in 1919) to take out their 8th flag. Unfortunately, the League team were dealt with 3 major season-ending injuries in their 2nd semi-final victory, ripping out their engine room including Magarey Medal Runner-up and eventual 2015 Club Champion Angus Rowntree, as well as number 1 ruckman Marc Borholm and former Reserves Magarey Medalist Angus Poole.

It proved too much to cover for the Eagles in the Grand Final, falling short to West Adelaide by 30 points. The U/18s also lost their decider.

=== SANFLW Commences at the Eagles ===
In 2018 the Woodville West Torrens Football Club were amongst the last of the SANFL clubs to enter a team in the SANFLW Competition that had been established in 2016 for a 2017 season. The Eagles SANFLW team played its inaugural season in 2019 being coached by Tess Baxter finished with the wooden spoon.

It has been a slow build for the SANFLW at the Eagles as it has struggled to attract players with finishing positions of 2019 - 8th (wooden spoon), 2020 - 7th, 2021 - 8th (wooden spoon), 2022 - 7th & 2023 - 7th.

After three years with Tess Baxter at the helm, a change of Senior Coach saw experienced Narelle Smith come in to the Senior Coach role with momentum starting to build in the women's football space at Oval Avenue.

With the addition of more established pathways to develop and grow zone talent including the drafting of Shineah Goody to PAFC - from local zone York Peninsula. 2024 may be the year the Eagles women's side improve on

the consistent finishing spot of 7th.

Following a 23-point loss to South Adelaide in the 2025 grand final, the Eagles returned to the pinnacle match of the 2026 season and reversed the result against Norwood, winning by 22 points to claim their maiden women's premiership. Full-forward Klaudia O'Neill dominated for the Eagles, kicking five goals en route to claiming the best on ground medal.

=== The Jade Sheedy era and going back-to-back ===
Before the start of the 2020 SANFL season, the club hired a new coach: former Sturt premiership player and Magarey Medalist Jade Sheedy. In Sheedy's first year in charge, the club finished minor premiers and advanced to the 2020 SANFL Grand Final where the club overcame North Adelaide by 39 points to win their first premiership in 9 years. This was the first premiership against North Adelaide. West Torrens had previously played North Adelaide in the 1949 SANFL Grand Final.

During the 2021 SANFL season, the Eagles finished 2nd behind minor premiers Glenelg who had lost only one game all season. They defeated Glenelg in the 2021 SANFL Grand Final by a margin of 67 points to claim their 5th premiership and became only the second team all year to defeat Glenelg. In doing so, the club went back-to-back for the first time in their history. Not even West Torrens had managed the feat previously.

West Torrens won 4 Premierships pre-1991, in 1924, 1933, 1945 and 1953.

== Player development ==
In 2011, a study commissioned by the AFL identified Woodville-West Torrens as the most effective developer of AFL talent in the country. From 1998 to 2010, the Eagles had 19 selected at the AFL Draft.

Notable AFL Listed Players

- Matthew Pavlich
- Brian Lake
- Matthew Stokes
- Scott Camporeale
- Bernie Vince
- Stephen Sziller
- Jay Schulz
- Kent Kingsley
- Rhett Biglands
- Nathan Bock
- Luke Thompson
- Jared Petrenko
- Jarrad Redden
- Martin Frederick
- Justin Cicolella
- Sam Jacobs
- Riley Knight
- Luke Dunstan
- Tyson Stengle
- Jimmy Toumpas
- Brennan Cox
- Brodie Smith
- Matthew Broadbent
- Brett Burton
- Aaron Shattock
- Sebastian Sergi
- Paul Stewart
- Ken McGregor
- Jack Hayes
- Jared Polec
- Cameron Sutcliffe
- Harry Schoenberg
- Jack Lukosius
- Glenn Freeborn

== Club details ==
=== Club song ===
The Woodville-West Torrens Football Club song is called "We're the mighty flying Eagles" and is to the tune of The Battle Hymn of the Republic

(Verse)

We're the mighty Eagles
And we always battle through
The mighty flying Eagles
Wearing Gold and Green and Blue
Sound the Siren, turn us loose
And watch the Feathers fly
And you'll see what we can do

(Chorus)

We're the mighty flying Eagles
We're the mighty flying Eagles
We're the mighty flying Eagles
In Gold and Green and Blue

(Home Run)

In Gold and Green and Blue

=== SANFL League Coaches ===
- 1991–1992 – Neil Balme
- 1993–1997 – Bruce Winter *
- 1998–1999 – Mark Mickan
- 2000 – Paul Hamilton
- 2001–2009 – Ron Fuller *
- 2010-2018 – Michael Godden *
- 2019 – Sam Lonergan
- 2020 – 2023 Jade Sheedy *
- 2024 – 2026 Sam Jacobs
- 2027 – Luke Barmby

italics current coach
* Premiership Coach

=== SANFLW League Coaches ===
- 2019 - 2021 - Tess Baxter
- 2022 - Narelle Smith *

italics current coach
* Premiership Coach

=== SANFL League Captains ===
- 1991–1994 – Peter Schwarz *
- 1995–2000 – Andrew Rogers
- 2001–2006 – Gavin Colville
- 2007 – Justin Cicolella *
- 2008–2011 – Mark McKenzie *
- 2012-2014 – Luke Powell
- 2015–2019 - Patrick Giuffreda & Luke Thompson
- 2020 - 2022 Luke Thompson *
- 2023 - 2025 Joseph Sinor
- 2026 - James Rowe & Riley Knight

italics current captain
* Premiership Captain (Justin Cicolella was acting captain for the 2006 Premiership)

=== SANFLW League Captains ===
- 2019 - Adele Gibson / Nicole Farrier
- 2020 - Adele Gibson / Megan Andreson
- 2021 - Anastasia Falkenberg
- 2025 - 2026 Anastasia Falkenberg & Poppy Waterford

== Current SANFL playing list ==
Woodville West Torrens Football Club
SANFL Senior list			Coaching staff
1 Luke McKay; 2 Zac Buck; 3 Kade Herbert; 4 Cameron Fleeton; 5 Adam D'Aloia; 6 Harrison Dawkins; 7 Riley Knight; 8 Will Neumann; 9 Max Beattie; 10 Connor Ballenden; 11 David Brinker-Ritchie; 12 Jack Hayes; 13 Will Pearce; 14 Blake Hansen; 15 Callum Fairall; 16 James Rowe; 17 Patrick Weckert; 18 Kobe Mutch; 19 Bailey Hann; 20 Jack Boyd	21 Nick Hayes; 22 Liam Puncher; 23 Sam Nicholls; 24 Sam Rowland; 25 Jordan Lukac; 26 Harry Dodd; 27 Jack Wheare; 28 Jordan Moore; 29 Jett Hasting; 30 Zane Williams; 31 Daniel Sladojevic; 32 Oliver Megins; 33 Deakan Jackson; 34 Lukas Cooke; 35 Joseph Sinor; 36 Jake Andrews; 37 Nathan Barkla; 38 Jordan Tilbrook; 39 Zac Schwarz; 40 Brody Mair	41 Patrick Toole; 42 Isacc McGrath; 43 Noah Angove; 44 Tate Delmenico; 45 Izacc Niemann; 46 Raymond Sumner; 47 Brandon Jackson-Martin; 48 Jay Watson; 49 Isaac Edwards; 50 Oskar Kilpatrick; 51 Max Litster; 52 Jack Hankins; 53 Liam Ueding; 55 Charlie McGrath; 56 Oscar Pearce; 57 Mishai Wollogorang; 58 Charlie Blair; 60 Sebastian Menta; 61 Jack Slattery; 62 Griffyn Hansen; 63 Josh Capogrego	Head coach: Sam Jacobs; Legend: (c) Captain(s); (vc) Vice-captain(s)

== Current SANFLW playing list ==
- 1 Poppy Waterford
- 2 Popi Gikas
- 3 Bianca Portaro
- 4 Mikayla Cavallaro
- 5 Chantelle Mitchell
- 6 Erini Gikas
- 7 Grace Martin
- 8 Ananstasia Falkenberg
- 9 Hannah Scholar
- 10 Audrey Holt
- 11 Madison Turner
- 12 Amie Blanden
- 13 Brianna Walling
- 14 Tayla Coles
- 15 Lucy Moore
- 16 Rose Clancy-Dillon
- 17 Skye Nagel
- 18 Klaudia O'Neill
- 19 Christina Luezzi
- 20 Cher Waters
- 21 Astrid Gooley
- 22 Imogen Trengove
- 23 McKenzie Dowrick
- 24 Sophie Zuill
- 25 Nikita McRostie
- 26 Leah Cutting
- 27 Renee Forth
- 28 Olivia Evans
- 29 Abbie Butler
- 30 Marlie Fiegert
- 31 Maddison McLeod
- 32 Rosette Zerella
- 33 Brooklyn Kraft
- 34 Shineah Goody
- 35 Jasmine Elsworthy
- 36 Jessie Sandford
- 37 Isabelle Benedictson
- 38 Zahlia Niemann
- 39 Georgie Blades
- 40 Ashleigh Forbes
- 41 Zoe McGill-Rankin
- 42 Sophie Whitwell
- 43 Kelsey Chadwick
- 44 Ashley Baker
- 45 Chanel Rugari
- 46 Sinead Saunders
- 48 Mikaya Bryant
- 49 Lily Tarlinton
- 50 Macy Young
- 52 Nicolette Dunn
- 54 Zara Kemp
- 57 Madison Paech
- 58 Brittany Higgins
- 60 Taylah Levy

SANFLW League Senior Coach= Narelle Smith

- Assistant (Mids) = Darren Sziller
- Assistant (Def) = Maria Mccarthy
- Assistant (Fwds) = Paul Uncle

SANFLW Development League Senior Coach= Claire Christie

- Game Day Coach= Talia Radan
- Development Coach= Caitlyn Swanson

== Honours ==
=== Club achievements ===
Premierships
Competition	Level	Wins	Years won
South Australian; National Football League	Men's Seniors	5	1993, 2006, 2011, 2020, 2021
South Australian; National Football League	Women's Seniors	1	2026
South Australian; National Football League	Men's Reserves	9	1992, 1993, 2000, 2001, 2004, 2013, 2014, 2015, 2020
South Australian; National Football League	Under 19s (1937–2008)	3	1996, 1998, 2000
South Australian; National Football League	Under 17s (1939–2008)	4	1993, 1998, 1999, 2000
South Australian; National Football League	Under 18s (2009–present)	6	2012, 2013, 2018, 2019, 2021, 2024
South Australian; National Football League	Under 16s (2010–present)	1	2022
Other titles and honours
Stanley H Lewis Trophy	Multiple	7	1993, 2000, 2013, 2015, 2016, 2017, 2020
SANFL Night Series	Men's Seniors	2	1993, 1994
Finishing positions
South Australian; National Football League	Minor premiership (men's seniors)	8	1993, 1994, 2000, 2006, 2015, 2016, 2017, 2020
South Australian; National Football League	Grand Finalists (men's seniors)	12	1993, 1994, 2000, 2001, 2004, 2005, 2006, 2011, 2015, 2016, 2020, 2021
South Australian; National Football League	Wooden spoons (men's seniors)	0	Nil
South Australian; National Football League	Minor premiership (women's seniors)	1	2025, 2026
South Australian; National Football League	Grand Finalists (women's seniors)	1	2025
South Australian; National Football League	Wooden spoons (women's seniors)	2	2019, 2021

=== Fos Williams medallists ===
Presented to best on ground for South Australia in a State match

- 2012 – Adam Grocke (representing South Australia vs Western Australia)
- 2023 – James Rowe (representing South Australia vs Western Australia)

=== Jack Oatey medallists ===
Presented to best on ground in an SANFL Grand Final

- 1993 – Steven Sziller
- 2006 – Hayden Skipworth
- 2011 – Craig Parry
- 2020 – Jordan Foote
- 2021 - Jack Hayes

=== Reserves Magarey medallists ===
- 1992 – Jason Sziller
- 1996 – Jason King
- 2003 – David Newett
- 2012 – Angus Poole
- 2015 – Matthew Appleton
- 2016 - Jake Comitogianni

=== Tomkins medallists (U/19s) ===
- 1997 – Adam O'Hara
- 1999 – Greg Chapman
- 2008 – Shane Harris

=== McCallum–Tomkins medallists (U/18s) ===
- 2013 – Paul Ventura
- 2018 - Kai Pudney

=== Bob Lee medallists ===
Presented to best on ground in an SANFL Reserves Grand Final

- 2001 – Brett O'Hara
- 2004 – Luke Spehr
- 2013 – Byron Sumner
- 2014 – Sam Martyn
- 2015 – Ethan Haylock
- 2020 – Mitch Mead

=== Alan Stewart medallists ===
Presented to best on ground in an SANFL U/18's Grand Final

- 2012 – Matthew Appelton
- 2013 – Malcolm Karpany
- 2018 - Jackson Mead
- 2019 - Michael Frederick
- 2021 - Adam D’Aloia
- 2024 - Jett Hasting

=== U16s Grand Final medal ===
Presented to best on ground in an SANFL U/16's Grand Final

- 2022 - Tom Luck

=== Ken Farmer medallists (SANFL Leading Goalkickers) ===
- Scott Morphett: 99 goals (1991)
- Mark Passador: 74 goals (2006)
- Michael Wundke: 63 goals (2014)
- James Rowe: 47 goals (2020)
- Daniel Menzel: 51 goals (2022)

=== Bob Quinn medalists ===
Presented to best on ground in an ANZAC Day match (Grand Final replay)

- 2005 – Luke Powell
- 2006 – Mark Passador
- 2016 – Jared Petrenko
- 2017 – Angus Poole
- 2021 – Sam Rowland

=== R.O. Shearman medalists ===
Presented to best SANFL player as voted by League coaches

- 2000 – Gavin Colville
- 2006 – Justin Cicolella
- 2016 – Jared Petrenko
- 2022 – Riley Knight

=== SANFLW League Best and fairest ===
- 2019 - Jaimi Tabb
- 2020 - Jovanka Zecevic
- 2021 - Anastasia Falkenberg
- 2022 - Sophie Zuill
- 2023 - Shineah Goody
- 2024 - Poppy Waterford
- 2025 - Leah Cutting
- 2026 - Tahlita Buethke

=== Life Governors ===
The highest individual honour that is bestowed by the club

- Bob Hank
- Lindsay Head
- Fred Bills
- Malcolm Blight
- Andrew Payze
- Andrew Rogers
- Bob Simunsen
- Ron Fuller
- Justin Cicolella
- Luke Powell
- Mark McKenzie
- Gavin Colville

== Honour Board 1991–2026 ==
Year	Ladder position	W–L–D	%	Finals	Coach	Captain(s)	Best & Fairest	Leading goalkicker	
1991	2nd	16–6–0	54.0	Semi–final	N Balme	P Schwarz	S Morphett	S Morphett	99
1992	2nd	15–7–0	51.4	Preliminary final	N Balme	P Schwarz	R Pyman	S Morphett	52
1993	1st	15–4–1	57.3	Premiers	B Winter	P Schwarz	A Rogers	A Taylor	74
1994	1st	18–4–0	58.2	Runners-up	B Winter	P Schwarz	J Sziller	A Taylor	61
1995	8th	7–15–0	44.8	DNQ	B Winter	A Rogers	A Rogers	S Morphett; A Taylor	25
1996	4th	12–8–0	52.0	Semi-final	B Winter	A Rogers	A Rogers	S Morphett	43
1997	7th	6–14–0	45.2	DNQ	B Winter	A Rogers	S Hall	M Kluzek	32
1998	6th	9–11–0	50.3	DNQ	M Mickan	A Rogers	N Pesch	R Pyman	33
1999	2nd	14–6–0	54.2	Preliminary final	M Mickan	A Rogers	G Colville; A Pearce	M Pavlich	38
2000	1st	17–3–0	61.8	Runners-up	P Hamilton	A Rogers	G Colville	C Kluzek	72
2001	3rd	14–6–0	56.1	Runners-up	R Fuller	G Colville	G Colville	C Kluzek	64
2002	4th	10–10–0	53.1	Semi-final	R Fuller	G Colville	J Cicolella	P Allison	25
2003	4th	12–8–0	51.7	Semi-final	R Fuller	G Colville	J Cicolella	M Passador	51
2004	2nd	16–4–0	57.7	Runners-up	R Fuller	G Colville	G Colville	V Rugolo	38
2005	2nd	15–5–0	57.2	Runners-up	R Fuller	G Colville	M McKenzie	M Passador	46
2006	1st	16–4–0	57.1	Premiers	R Fuller	G Colville	M McKenzie	M Passador	79
2007	3rd	12–7–0	53.2	Preliminary final	R Fuller	J Cicolella	L Treeby	B Schwarze	46
2008	6th	9–11–0	49.7	DNQ	R Fuller	M McKenzie	M McKenzie; L Powell	M Passador	79
2009	4th	11–8–1	49.8	Semi-final	R Fuller	M McKenzie	M McKenzie	N Salter	45
2010	5th	11–9–0	51.7	Preliminary final	M Godden	M McKenzie	J Cicollela	A Grocke	40
2011	3rd	13–7–0	54.9	Premiers	M Godden	M McKenzie	M McKenzie	A Grocke	49
2012	5th	9–11–0	47.1	Elimination final	M Godden	L Powell	A Rowntree	A Grocke	34
2013	2nd	13–7–0	54.6	Semi-final	M Godden	L Powell	P Raymond	A Aigner	51
2014	5th	10–8–0	50.2	Elimination final	M Godden	L Powell	S Lewis	M Wundke	63
2015	1st	16–2–0	58.2	Runners-up	M Godden	P Giuffreda; L Thompson	A Rowntree	M Wundke	38
2016	1st	14–4–0	58.6	Runners-up	M Godden	P Giuffreda; L Thompson	J Petrenko	M Wundke	46
2017	1st	14–4–0	54.9	Preliminary final	M Godden	P Giuffreda; L Thompson	J Sinor	M Wundke	36
2018	2nd	12–5–1	55.8	Preliminary final	M Godden	P Giuffreda; L Thompson	J Boyd	J Hayes	39
2019	7th	8–10–0	49.0	DNQ	S Lonergan	P Giuffreda; L Thompson	J Foote	J Rowe	39
2020	1st	11–3–0	61.0	Premiers	J Sheedy	L Thompson	J Sinor	J Rowe	47
2021	2nd	13–5–0	59.8	Premiers	J Sheedy	L Thompson	J Tsitas	D Menzel; T Stengle	44
2022	7th	9–9–0	49.5	DNQ	J Sheedy	L Thompson	R Knight	D Menzel	51
2023	8th	6–12–0	47.3	DNQ	J Sheedy	J Sinor	J Rowe	C Ballenden	29
2024	5th	8–10–0	51.8	Elimination final	S Jacobs	J Sinor	S Rowland	C Ballenden	34
2025	7th	7–11–0	47.1	DNQ	S Jacobs	J Sinor	J Rowe	C Ballenden	31
2026	3rd	12-9-0	51.44	Preliminary Final	S Jacobs	J Rowe; R Knight	T Clohesy	C Ballenden	39

== Club records ==
- South Australian Premiers: 9 – 1924, 1933, 1945, 1953, 1993, 2006, 2011, 2020, 2021
- South Australian Night Series Winners: 4 – 1983, 1988, 1993, 1994
- Home Ground(s): Woodville Oval (Maughan Thiem Kia Oval) (1992–present)
- Former Home Ground(s): Football Park (AAMI Stadium) (1991), Thebarton Oval (Adelaide Airport Stadium) (2012– 2014)
- Record Attendance: 42,719 v Norwood at Football Park, 1993 SANFL Grand Final
- Record Attendance Minor Round: 15,126 v Port Adelaide at Football Park, 1994 SANFL ANZAC Day
- Record Night Attendance at Thebarton Oval: 4,566 v Port Adelaide, Round 1, 2012
- Most Games: 266 by Justin Cicolella (1998–2012)
- Most Goals in a Season: 99 by Scott Morphett in 1991
- Most Goals for the Club: 312 by Mark Passador (2003–10)
- Most Goals in a Game: 12 by Andrew Taylor vs North Adelaide in 1994
- Most Years as Coach: 9 by Michael Godden (2010–18)
- Most Premierships as Coach: 2 by Jade Sheedy (2020, 2021)
- Most Years as Captain: 8 by Luke Thompson (2015–22)
- Most Premierships as Captain: 2 by Jonny Walker (2020, 2021)
- Most Best & Fairest Awards: 5 by Mark McKenzie (2005, 2006, 2008, 2009, 2011)
- SANFL Magarey Medallists: James Tsitas (2021)
- SANFL Ken Farmer Medallists: Scott Morphett (1991), Mark Passador (2006), Michael Wundke (2014), James Rowe (2020), Daniel Menzel (2022)
- Highest Score: 30.14 (194) v North Adelaide in 1994
- Longest Winning Run: 14 (1993–94 – last 7 games in 1993, first 7 games in 1994)
- Longest Winning Run in a Season: 12 (2004)
- Longest Losing Run: 8 (1997)

== Home grounds ==
The Woodville-West Torrens Eagles first home ground was SANFL league headquarters Football Park in their inaugural season of 1991. In 1992, the new club had to move to Tusmore Park temporarily due to lack of infastrcure at Woodville Oval. Under the direction of local M.P. Steele Hall, the park was set up for football, however ended in disaster. A dispute broke out around payment between Hall and the club, as well as around the designated name of the oval. Due to the dilemmas, building plans were rushed ahead, with the club moving permanently to the Woodville Oval (former home of the Woodville Warriors) in late 1992. Due to Woodville Oval also being the home of the Woodville Cricket Club who play in the South Australian Grade Cricket League, the Eagles use West Torrens' former home ground Thebarton Oval as their pre-season training base. Thebarton, which had lights installed for night games since the 1950s (the lights were upgraded in 2011–12), is occasionally used as an alternative playing venue for the club, with the team having played a handful of games at the venue since 2006.

- Football Park (AAMI Stadium) (1991)
- Tusmore Park (Colosseum) (1992)
- Woodville Oval (Maughan Thiem Hyundai Oval) (1993—present)
- Thebarton Oval (Adelaide Airport Stadium) (2006—2012)
