= Woodville Oval =

Sports venue in Woodville, South Australia

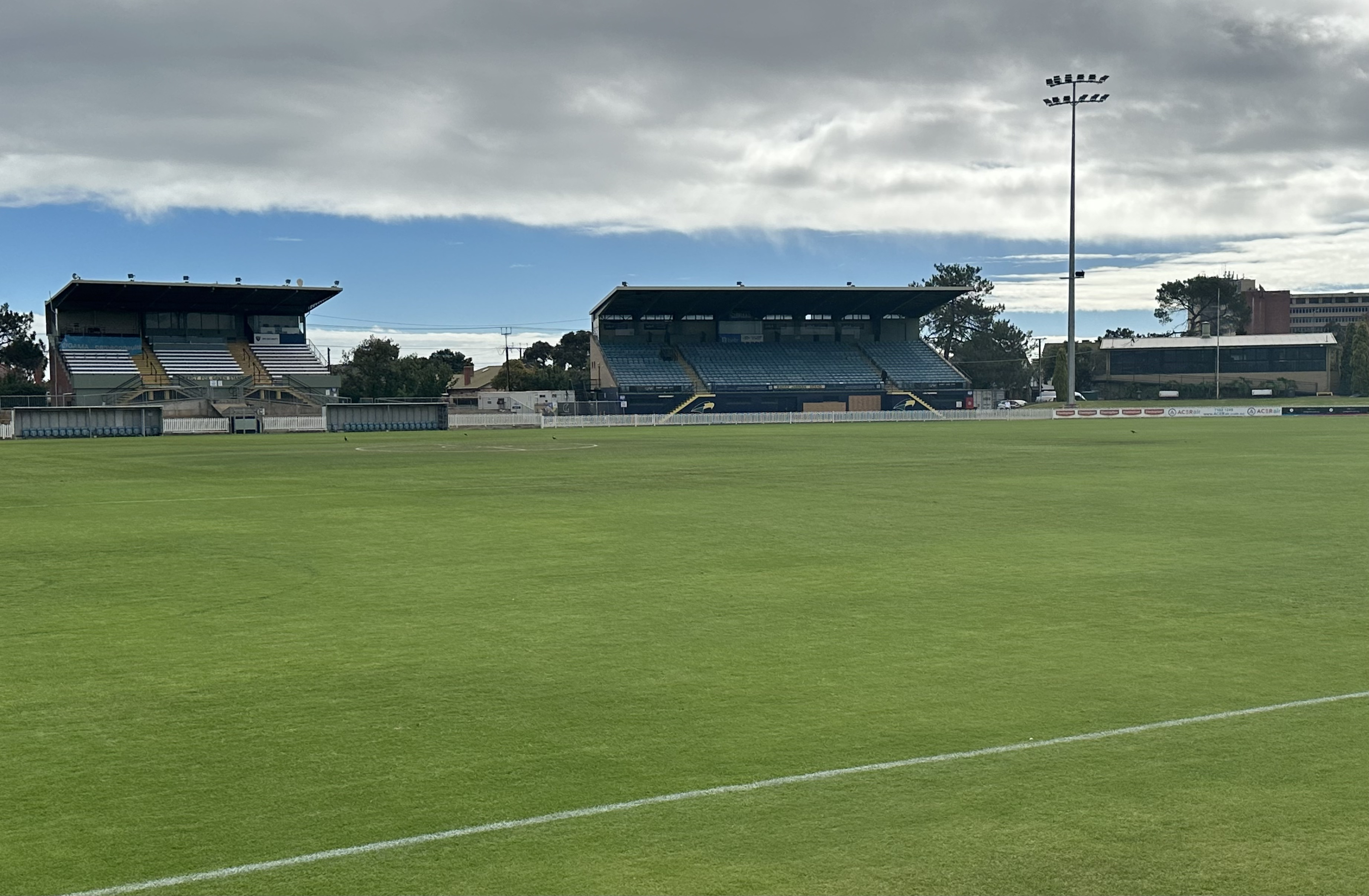
- Woodville Oval in April 2026
- Interactive map of Woodville Oval
- Former names: Unleash Solar Oval; Maughan Thiem Hyundai Oval
- Address: Oval Avenue; Woodville, South Australia
- Coordinates: 34°53′17″S 138°32′18″E
- Owner: City of Charles Sturt
- Operator: Woodville-West Torrens Football Club
- Capacity: 15,000
- Record attendance: 11,026 – Woodville vs Port Adelaide, 9 August 1986
- Field size: Football: 175m x 110m

Tenants
- Woodville-West Torrens Football Club (SANFL) (1992–present); Woodville Football Club (SANFL) (1941–1990); Woodville Cricket Club

Ground information
- Only women's ODI: 28 February 2006: Australia v India

Woodville Oval (known under naming rights as Maughan Thiem Kia Oval) is an Australian rules football and cricket venue located in the Adelaide suburb of Woodville South.

It is the home of the Woodville-West Torrens Football Club in the South Australian National Football League (SANFL) and the Woodville Cricket Club in the South Australian Premier Cricket (SAPC) competition.

== History ==
Woodville Oval has a capacity of around 15,000 people, with seating for up to 2,000 in two covered stands located on the western side of the ground, with the players changerooms located under the Barry Jarman Stand on the centre wing. The playing surface of the oval is 175m x 110m.

The ground's attendance record was set on 9 August 1986 when 11,026 saw Woodville, led by captain-coach and club legend Malcolm Blight, and on their way to a rare SANFL finals appearance, defeat their hated western suburbs 'big brother' Port Adelaide 14.11 (95) to 13.11 (89) in their Round 18 match.

Adjoining the Oval directly to the north is the Woodville Lawn Bowling Club, the Woodville Croquet Club and the Woodville Glengarry Tennis Club, with both lawn and hardcourts it is one of the largest multi surface tennis clubs in the Adelaide.

On-site car parking is available for Eagles members, located near the Eagles club rooms in the north-west of the facility while limited on-street parking is available for the general public during Eagles SANFL games at the ground.

Woodville Oval is located approximately 600 metres from one of Adelaide's major public hospitals, the Queen Elizabeth Hospital.
