= 1985 SANFL Grand Final =

1985 Australian rules football final

Glenelg	North Adelaide
21.15 (141)	12.12 (84)
	1	2	3	4
GLE	2.2 (14)	9.7 (61)	14.10 (94)	21.15 (141)
NA	4.4 (28)	7.7 (49)	9.10 (64)	12.12 (84)
- Date: Saturday, 5 October (2:10 pm)
- Stadium: Football Park
- Attendance: 50,289
- Umpires: Laurie Argent, Rick Kinnear
- Coin toss won by: North Adelaide
- Kicked toward: Lake End

Broadcast in Australia
- Network: Seven Network
- Commentators: Peter Marker; Ian Day; Robert Oatey

The 1985 SANFL Grand Final was an Australian rules football game contested between the Glenelg Football Club and North Adelaide Football Club at Football Park on 5 October 1985. It was the 87th grand final of the South Australian National Football League, staged to determine the premiers for the 1985 SANFL season. The match, attended by 50,289 spectators, was won by Glenelg by a margin of 57 points, marking the club's third SANFL premiership, having previously won the premiership in 1973. Glenelg's Stephen Kernahan won the Jack Oatey Medal as the player judged best on ground.

== Teams ==
Glenelg
B:	2 Ross Gibbs	26 Chris Duthy	6 Michael Murphy
HB:	11 Tony Hall	31 John Seebohm	14 Wayne Stringer
C:	9 Tony Symonds	25 Alan Stringer	37 David Kernahan
HF:	16 David Marshall	4 Stephen Kernahan (v/c)	19 Stephen Copping
F:	8 Tony McGuinness	22 Adam Garton	5 Peter Carey (c)
Foll:	29 Wayne Henwood	30 Peter Maynard	10 Chris McDermott
Int:	17 Robin Kidney	36 Scott Salisbury	
Coach:	Graham Cornes		

NORTH ADELAIDE: 4. David Tiller (c) 1. John Riley 3. Darel Hart 6. Trevor Hill 7. Kim Klomp 9. David Sanders 12. Paul Zoontjens 13. Tony Antrobus 14. Stephen Hay 15. John Brealey 16. Michael Armfield 17. Andrew Jarman 22. Stephen Riley 23. David Wildy 25. Matthew Campbell 27. Brenton Phillips, 28. Michael Parsons 32. Paul Arnold 34. David Robertson 35. Peter Bennett 42. Mick Redden (v/c)
Coach: Michael Nunan

== Match Summary ==
Retiring champion Malcolm Blight was given the honour of tossing the coin. North skipper David Tiller called correctly and elected to kick to the Lake End.

Midway through the second quarter, the Roosters had opened up a 29-point lead after restricting the Tigers to just two goals.

But then, in one moment, the momentum of the match shifted dramatically.

== Aftermath ==
Years later, when reflecting on the sudden change in momentum in the second quarter that swung the result in Glenelg's favour, Graham Cornes remarked: ”It was as if someone flicked the switch and it all turned.”
