= 1985 SANFL season =

Football season

- Teams: 10
- Premiers: Glenelg; 3rd premiership
- Minor premiers: North Adelaide; 12th minor premiership
- Magarey Medallist: Grantley Fielke; West Adelaide (54 votes)
- Ken Farmer Medallist: Malcolm Blight; Woodville (126 Goals)

Attendance
- Matches played: 116
- Total attendance: 815,396 (7,029 per match)
- Highest: 50,289 (Grand Final, Glenelg vs. North Adelaide)

The 1985 South Australian National Football League season was the 106th season of the top-level Australian rules football competition in South Australia.

== Ladder ==
1985 SANFL Ladder
Pos	Team	Pld	W	L	D	PF	PA	PP	Pts
1	North Adelaide	22	15	7	0	2738	2460	52.67	30
2	Norwood	22	14	7	1	2602	2362	52.42	29
3	Glenelg (P)	22	14	8	0	2704	2263	54.44	28
4	West Adelaide	22	13	9	0	2856	2591	52.43	26
5	Sturt	22	12	9	1	2741	2470	52.60	25
6	Central District	22	11	11	0	2649	2546	50.99	22
7	Port Adelaide	22	8	14	0	2464	2786	46.93	16
8	South Adelaide	22	8	14	0	2315	2693	46.23	16
9	West Torrens	22	8	14	0	2481	2946	45.72	16
10	Woodville	22	6	16	0	2752	3185	46.35	12

Rules for classification: 1) points; 2) percentage; 3) number of points for.
(P) Premiers

== 1985 SANFL Finals ==
=== Week 1 ===
1985 SANFL Elimination Final
Saturday, 14 September (2:10pm)	West Adelaide	def.	Sturt	Football Park (crowd: 20,828)
5.5 (35); 7.13 (55); 14.20 (104); 17.21 (123)	Q1; Q2; Q3; Final	3.2 (20); 7.8 (50); 10.10 (70); 16.14 (110)	Umpires: Argent, Thorp
Smith 6.3, Andrews 5.4, Bennett 2.0, Lamb, Morris 1.2, Fielke 1.1, Meuret 1.0, D. Herbert 0.2, Grosser 0.1	Goals	Motley, Hollis 3.2, Fielke 2.1, Paynter, Craig 2.0, Willmott 1.2, Viney 1.1, Frost, Work 1.0, Smith 0.2, Martin 0.1
D. Herbert, Fielke, C. Herbert, Shaw, Hamilton, Mickan	Best	Craig, Paynter, Poech, Smith, Motley, Whittlesea

1985 SANFL Qualifying Final
Sunday, 15 September (2:10pm)	Norwood	def. by	Glenelg	Football Park (crowd: 25,316)
3.3 (21); 10.9 (69); 11.15 (81); 16.13 (109)	Q1; Q2; Q3; Final	7.4 (46); 11.7 (73); 16.10 (106); 21.13 (139)	Umpires: Field, Kinnear
O'Dwyer 3.1, K. Thomas, M. Aish 2.2, Taylor 2.1, G. Thomas 2.0, McIntosh 1.2, Neagle 1.1, Jenkins, Jarvis 1.0, (Note: One Norwood goal is missing from the Advertiser reports), Payne 0.5, Halyer, Michelanney, A. Aish 0.1	Goals	Gorton 6.2, Copping 5.0, S. Kernahan 4.3, Symonds 3.0, McGuinness 2.2, Carey 1.1, Marshall, Murphy, A. Stringer, Motlop, Maynard
Taylor, McIntosh, M. Aish, Gallagher, K. Thomas, Payne	Best	S. Kernahan, Symonds, Copping, Maynard, Henwood, W. Stringer, Gorton

=== Week 2 ===
1985 SANFL First-Semi Final
Saturday, 21 September (2:10pm)	Norwood	def. by	West Adelaide	Football Park (crowd: 25,419)
3.3 (21); 5.6 (36); 7.6 (48); 13.7 (85)	Q1; Q2; Q3; Final	5.1 (31); 6.4 (40); 13.10 (88); 16.13 (109)	Umpires: Kinnear, Hylton
O'Dwyer, Taylor 3.0, G. Thomas 2.0, Fondike, K. Thomas, Kelly 1.1, Michelanney, Payne 1.0, Gallagher 0.2, McIntosh, Neagle 0.1	Goals	Andrews 3.2, Meuret 3.1, Morris 3.0, Lamb 2.2, Woodhall 2.1, Mickan, Rennie, Bennett 1.0, Fielke, Smith 0.2, Conlen 0.1
Winter, Gallagher, Taylor, K. Thomas M. Aish	Best	Mickan, C. Herbert, D. Herbert, Meuret, Bennett, Fielke, Rennie

1985 SANFL Second Semi-Final
Sunday, 22 September (2:10pm)	North Adelaide	def. by	Glenelg	Football Park (crowd: 25,926)
7.4 (46); 11.6 (72); 14.9 (93); 16.12 (108)	Q1; Q2; Q3; Final	5.1 (31); 12.6 (78); 14.11 (95); 18.14 (122)	Umpires: Argent, Hilton
Parsons 4.1, Jarman 3.1, Dietrich 3.1, Phillips 2.1, Hart, Klomp 1.1, Hill, Tiller 1.0, Campbell 0.2, Antrobus, Robertson 0.1	Goals	Gorton 5.2, Marshall 3.2, S. Kernahan 2.3, McGuinness 2.2, Symonds 2.1, Maynard 2.0, D. Kernahan 1.2, A. Stringer 1.0, McDermott, Motlop 0.1
Hart, Redden, J. Riley, Jarman, Tiller, Parsons	Best	A. Stringer, S. Kernahan, McDermott, Gibbs, McGuinness, Salisbury

=== Week 3 (Preliminary Final) ===
1985 SANFL Preliminary Final
Sunday, 29 September (2:10pm)	North Adelaide	def.	West Adelaide	Football Park (crowd: 27,251)
2.1 (13); 8.8 (56); 13.11 (89); 18.13 (121)	Q1; Q2; Q3; Final	5.6 (36); 6.8 (44); 10.12 (72); 16.14 (110)	Umpires: Kinnear, Hylton
Parsons, Sanders 3, Antrobus, Campbell, Tiller, Phillips, Brealey 2, Wildy, Robertson	Goals	Woodhall 4.0, Miller, McKinnon 2.0, Smith 1.3, Fielke 1.2, Andrews, Morris 1.1, Bennet, D. Herbert, Ryan, Meuret 1.0, Conlen 0.1
Jarman, J. Riley, Campbell, Phillips, Hart, Redden, Antrobus	Best	Fielke, Hamilton, Andrews, Kantlaftas, Rennie, Mickan, Bennett
After a sluggish start – and despite easing off at the very end – North rebound for its first Grand Final berth in twelve seasons against a West team that had won twelve of its last thirteen but was without key players Leon Grosser, Derek Shaw, Roger Luders and Mark Dreher.

=== Week 4 (Grand Final) ===
1985 SANFL Grand Final
Saturday, 5 October (2:10pm)	Glenelg	def.	North Adelaide	Football Park (crowd: 50,289)
2.2 (14); 9.7 (61); 14.10 (94); 21.15 (141)	Q1; Q2; Q3; Final	4.4 (28); 7.7 (49); 9.10 (64); 12.12 (84)	Umpires: Argent, Kinnear; Jack Oatey Medal: Stephen Kernahan (Glenelg)
Stephen Kernahan 7.3, Garton 4.1, Copping 3.1, McGuinness 2.3, McDermott 1.1, Symonds 1.0, Hall 1.0, Henwood 1.0, Maynard 1.0, W. Stringer 0.2, Kidney 0.1	Goals	Parsons 2.2, Hart 2.2, Robertson 2.1, Brealey 2.0, Sanders 2.0, Antrobus 1.1, Tiller 1.0, Jarman 0.4, Campbell 0.1
Gibbs, Stephen Kernahan, Carey, Symonds, MeGuinness, Maynard, Kidney	Best	Phillips, Redden, S. Riley, Campbell, Armfield, Riley
Injuries	Wildy (damaged retina, left eye); Parsons (groin)

== Events ==
- 12 May – Former Hawthorn player Don Scott resigns as South Adelaide coach, after Port Adelaide defeat the Panthers 21.16 (142) to 10.15 (75). It was Scott's sixth loss from six games in charge.
