= 1987 SANFL Grand Final =

1987 Australian rules football final

North Adelaide	Glenelg
23.7 (145)	9.9 (63)
	1	2	3	4
NA	5.2 (32)	11.4 (70)	18.5 (113)	23.7 (145)
GLE	0.1 (1)	1.5 (11)	4.7 (31)	9.9 (63)
- Date: Saturday, 3 October (2:10 pm)
- Stadium: Football Park
- Attendance: 50,617
- Umpires: Neville Thorpe, Rick Kinnear, Mostyn Rutter (goal)
- Coin toss won by: Darel Hart (NA)
- Kicked toward: southern end (with the wind)

Ceremonies
- National anthem: Ricky May

Accolades
- Jack Oatey Medallist: Michael Parsons (North Adelaide)

Broadcast in Australia
- Network: Channel 7 and 2
- Commentators: Peter Marker, David Darcy, Ian Day, Graham Campbell

The 1987 SANFL Grand Final was an Australian rules football game contested between the North Adelaide Football Club and the Glenelg Football Club, held at Football Park on 3 October 1987. It was the 70th annual grand final of the South Australian National Football League, staged to determine the premiers for the 1987 SANFL season. The match, attended by 50,617 spectators, was won by North Adelaide by a margin of 82 points, marking that club's 12th premiership victory.

== Background ==
This was the third consecutive year that North coached by Michael Nunan and Glenelg coached by Graham Cornes met in the grand final. It gave Nunan his first success as a coach, and Cornes the first of 3 losses in 4 years.

The Jack Oatey Medal was won by North Adelaide ruckman Michael Parsons who top scored with 6 goals and 1 behind.

== Teams ==
1987 Premiership Team
B:	Peter Simmons (31)	32 Paul Arnold	22 Stephen Riley
HB:	1 John Riley	29 Trevor Clisby	4 David Tiller
C:	11 Roger Carlaw	Kym Klomp (7)	David Sanders (9)
HF:	Darren Jarman (8)	Peter Bennett (35)	5 Craig Burton
F:	Michael Parsons (28)	25 John Roberts	2 Steven Sims
Foll:	42 Michael Redden	17 Andrew Jarman	3 Darel Hart (c)
Int:	16 Michael Armfield	34 Wayne Slattery	
Coach:	Michael Nunan		

Glenelg: F: Craig Woodlands, John Seebohm, Robin Kidney HF: Alan Stringer, Tony Hall, Geoff Winton C: Mark Hewett, David Marshall, David Kernahan HB: Wayne Stringer, Michael Murphy, David Grenvold B: Max Kruse, Jim West, Scott Salisbury R: Peter Carey, Peter Maynard, Chris McDermott Int: Ross Gibbs, Mark Donovan Coach: Graham Cornes

== Match summary ==
The match was played in superb conditions. Besides North Adelaide's crushing victory, this game would later become known for Ricky May's terrible performance of the national anthem before the game, forgetting the lyrics and falling out of tempo with the backing track.
