= South Australian Football Hall of Fame =

Australian rules football hall of fame

The South Australian Football Hall of Fame enshrines those who have made a most significant contribution to the game of Australian Football.

The Hall of Fame was established in 2002 when 114 outstanding individuals became inaugural inductees.

Since then, the contributions of other players, administrators, media representatives and umpires have been added to this prestigious roll of honour... To be eligible for hall of fame award a player must have been retired from football for at least three years.

== 2002 ==
114 inductees:

- John Abley
- John Acraman
- Brenton Adcock
- Merv Agars
- Michael Aish
- Ken Aplin
- Paul Bagshaw
- Alby Bahr
- Barrie Barbary
- Fred Bills
- Malcolm Blight
- Dave Boyd
- Don Brebner
- Haydn Bunton, Jr
- John Cahill
- Peter Carey
- Colin Churchett
- Graham Cornes
- Allan Crabb
- Neil Craig
- John Daly
- Tony Daly
- Peter Darley
- Neil Davies
- Rick Davies
- Robert Day
- Les Dayman
- Jim Deane
- Murray Ducker
- Russell Ebert
- Ken Eustice
- Tim Evans
- Brian Faehse
- Ken Farmer
- Grantley Fielke
- Len Fitzgerald
- Des Foster
- Percy Furler
- Frank Golding
- Michael Graham
- John Halbert
- Bob Hammond
- Jim Handby
- Bob Hank
- Neville Hayes
- Lindsay Head
- Richard Head
- Ned Hender
- Thomas Hill
- Kym Hodgeman
- Sampson Hosking
- Laurie Jervis
- George Johnston
- Neil Kerley
- Stephen Kernahan
- Ron Kneebone
- Ray Kutcher
- Tom Leahy
- Bob Lee
- Percy Lewis
- Alick Lill
- Don Lindner
- Tom MacKenzie
- Peter Marker
- Frank Marlow
- John Marriott
- Chris McDermott
- Bruce McGregor
- Tony McGuinness
- Ian McKay
- Bob McLean
- Peter Mead
- Mark Mickan
- Hugh Millard
- Dan Moriarty
- Geof Motley
- Max Murdy
- Mark Naley
- Michael Nunan
- Jack Oatey
- Robert Oatey
- Doug Olds
- Harold Oliver
- Jack Owens
- Dennis Phillis
- Greg Phillips
- Ron Phillips
- John Platten
- Jeff Potter
- Bob Quinn
- John Quinn
- Michael Redden
- Dinny Reedman
- Colin Richens
- Don Roach
- Barrie Robran
- Len Sallis
- Rick Schoff
- Gordon Schwartz
- Walter Scott
- Ralph Sewer
- Bob Shearman
- Bernie Smith
- Laurie Sweeney
- Michael Taylor
- Jack Tredrea
- Frank Tully
- Topsy Waldron
- Bill Wedding
- Paul Weston
- Ted Whelan
- Syd White
- Fos Williams
- John Woods

== 2003 ==
10 inductees:

- Max Basheer
- Jack Cockburn
- Norm Grimm
- Ray Huppatz
- David Marshall
- Jeff Pash
- Vic Richardson
- Alton Smith
- Colin Smith
- Mark Williams

== 2004 ==
10 inductees:

- Wayne Jackson
- Vic Johnson
- Tony Kenny
- Bruce Lindsay
- P. T. (Bo) Morton
- Wally Miller
- Sandy Nelson
- Rodney Pope
- Allan "Bull" Reval
- Allan Roberts

== 2005 ==
Eight inductees:

- Laurie Argent
- Brian Cunningham
- Don Gilbourne
- Peter Kitschke
- Andrew Rogers
- Cliff Semmler
- Clayton Thompson
- Gary Window

== 2006 ==
Eight inductees:

- Craig Bradley
- John Forrester
- Darren Jarman
- Rick Kinnear
- Jack Lynch
- Shaun Rehn
- Neville Roberts
- Bob Simunsen

== 2007 ==
10 inductees:

- Bruce Abernethy
- Mark Bickley
- Jeff Bray
- Ian Day
- Max Hall
- Scott Hodges
- Andrew Jarman
- Andrew McKay
- Kevin McSporran
- John T. Taylor

== 2008 ==
Five inductees:

- Geoff Kingston
- Nigel Smart
- Doug Thomas
- Keith Thomas
- Peter Woite

== 2010 ==
Eight inductees:

- Josh Francou
- John 'Snowy' Hamilton
- Horrie Riley
- Mostyn Rutter
- Bill Sanders
- Terry Von Bertouch
- Ernest Wadham
- Bruce Winter

== 2012 ==
Eleven inductees:

- K. G. Cunningham
- Kevin Duggan
- Simon Goodwin
- Ben Hart
- Garry McIntosh
- Andrew McLeod
- Don McSweeny
- Mark Ricciuto
- Warren Tredrea
- Gavin Wanganeen
- Richard Williams

== 2014 ==
Ten inductees:

- Laurie Cahill
- Chad Cornes
- Tyson Edwards
- Phil Gallagher
- Chris Gowans
- James Gowans
- Darel Hart
- Tony Modra
- Tim Pfeiffer
- Matthew Primus

== 2015 ==
Five inductees:

- Tim Ginever
- Brett James
- Rodney Maynard
- John Paynter
- Leigh Whicker

== 2016 ==
Five inductees:

- Brenton Phillips
- Roger James
- Stephen Williams
- John Wynne
- Brian Sando

== 2017 ==
Three inductees:

- Stuart Palmer
- Michael O'Loughlin
- John Condon

== 2018 ==
Three inductees:

- Peter Vivian
- Darren Smith
- Harry Kernahan

== 2019 ==
Three inductees:

- Peter Motley
- Greg Anderson
- W. (Bill) Mayman

== 2022 ==
Four inductees:

- Kane Cornes
- Matthew Pavlich
- Bruce Schultz
- Darren Wilson

== 2023 ==
Four inductees:

- Daryl Hicks
- Nick Chigwidden
- Sonny Morey
- Charles Kingston

== 2024 ==
Four inductees:

- Lyle Griffin
- Roy Laird
- Jade Sheedy
- Scott Thompson

== 2025 ==
Four inductees:

- Andrew Payze
- James Allan
- David Kantilla
- Kris Grant
