= 1991 SANFL Grand Final =

1991 Australian rules football final

North Adelaide	West Adelaide
21.22 (148)	11.7 (73)
	1	2	3	4
NTH	5.4 (34)	11.9 (75)	15.12 (102)	21.22 (148)
WA	4.2 (26)	7.3 (45)	10.4 (64)	11.7 (73)
- Date: Saturday, 5 October (2:10 pm)
- Stadium: Football Park
- Attendance: 39,276

The 1991 South Australian National Football League (SANFL) Grand Final saw North Adelaide defeat West Adelaide by 75 points. The match was played on Saturday 5 October 1991 at Football Park in front of a crowd of 39,276.

== Teams ==
1991 Premiership Team
B:	Rod Saunders (4)	Sean Tasker (21)	Bradley Ryan (24)
HB:	Steven Barratt (18)	Trevor Clisby (29)	Tim Perkins (15)
C:	David Sanders (9)	Peter Krieg (17)	Marc Marshall (19)
HF:	Brodie Atkinson (47)	Peter Bennett (35)	Steven Hamilton (25)
F:	Craig Burton (5)	Michael Parsons (28)	Darel Hart (3)
Foll:	Michael Redden (42)	Kym Klomp (c) (7)	Steven Sims (2)
Int:	Stephen Riley (22)	Tim Nunan (38)	
Coach:	Michael Nunan		
