= Grenville Dietrich =

Australian rules footballer

Personal information
- Full name: Grenville Dietrich
- Born: 5 March 1960 (age 66); Mildura, Victoria
- Position: Full forward

Playing career^{1}
Years	Club	Games (Goals)
1982–86	North Adelaide (SANFL)	103 (445)
1987–88	West Torrens (SANFL)	24 (72)
Total		127 (517)
- ^{1} Playing statistics correct to the end of 1988.

Career highlights
- SANFL debut with North Adelaide in 1982 vs South Adelaide at Prospect Oval; North Adelaide Leading Goal kicker 1982-86; 2 State of Origin games for South Australia

Grenville Dietrich (born 5 March 1960) is a retired Australian Rules football player who played for the North Adelaide and West Torrens football clubs in the South Australian National Football League (SANFL) between 1982 and 1988.

== Early life ==
Dietrich grew up in Mildura in a football loving family. Like his mother, Dietrich was an Essendon supporter, while his father barracked for Geelong. He lived "around the corner" from former Sturt player Geoff Lauder, while his sister went to school with West Adelaide player Greg Hollick.

== Career ==
=== Teal Cup ===
Grenville represented Victoria in a victorious Teal Cup side in 1977, and was rewarded with All Australian selection at centre-half-forward with such players as Roger Merrett, Doug Hawkins, Stevie Wright, Mark Bos, Glen Hawker, Justin Maddern, Neale Daniher, just to name a few.

=== VFL ===
In 1978, Dietrich played in a trial game for Richmond against North Melbourne. During his time brief in Melbourne he lived with Richmond player Kevin Sheedy, whom he is still friends with to this day. Dietrich counts his time at Richmond as a great learning experience, but regrets not playing more games for the club due to torn ankle ligaments. Since his time at the Tigers, Dietrich has been a supporter of the club in the AFL.

=== Millewa Football League ===
After returning to Mildura, Grenville Dietrich played for Bambill in the Millewa Football League in 1980 and 1981. Here he was spotted by former North Adelaide player David Cearns, who was in town to watch his brother-in-law, Mildura assistant coach Neville Caldow. Cearns gave Dietrich's name to North Adelaide, and one or two years later he was visited by a delegation from the club who convinced him to sign with the Roosters in 1982.

=== SANFL ===
Dietrich made his SANFL debut for the Roosters, playing Centre half-forward against South Adelaide at Prospect Oval in 1982. He injured his ankle before half time and sat out the rest of the game beside ruckman Mick Redden who had the same injury, also suffered before half time. It was the last time he would play centre half-forward for North.

Dietrich became known for his quick leads and high marking ability, despite his less than athletic physique (the joke in Adelaide at the time was that his training regime consisted of one or two laps around Prospect Oval, with the rest of the night spent sitting at the club's bar working his elbow).

Dietrich topped North Adelaide's goal kicking list in 1983 and 1984, both times kicking over 100 goals for the season. Unfortunately on both occasions he wasn't awarded the Ken Farmer Medal as the SANFL's leading goal kicker as Rick Davies (Sturt - 151 in 1983) and Tim Evans (Port - 127 in 1984) had kicked more goals in each season. In not winning the medal he became the only player in SANFL history to twice kick over 100 goals in a season and not be the league's leading goal kicker.

He played in North's losing Grand Final teams in 1985 and 1986, losing both times to Glenelg. The 1986 season had started brilliantly for Dietrich, who was averaging 8 goals per game before injuring his knee in a night series game and missed most of the last half of the season (before the AFL the SANFL Grand Finalists from the previous season were invited to play in the VFL's Night Premiership). After having Arthroscopic surgery on his knee, he returned one game before the finals to take his place in the Roosters 1986 Grand Final team. After an unhappy first half of the game, he was benched by coach Michael Nunan at half time and never returned to the field.

At the end of 1986, Dietrich and Nunan, who weren't getting along with each other, sat down to talk about the future. Cearns, who had recently been appointed the Football Director at West Torrens, approached him about the possibility of moving to the Eagles in 1987. Dietrich signed with Torrens, who in return sent Steven Sims, John Roberts and Sean Tasker to the Roosters. Despite his differences with Nunan, Dietrich still holds his coaching in high regard and has stated his preferred option was to stay at North Adelaide.

Dietrich topped the struggling Eagles' goal kicking list in 1987 with 54 goals (Roberts kicked 111 for North and won the Ken Farmer Medal). He retired from playing after only two games of the 1988 SANFL season. Ironically, North Adelaide would win the SANFL Grand Final in 1987, finally getting the better of Glenelg.

As of 2013, Grenville Dietrich sits 20th on the list of all-time leading SANFL goal kickers with 517 goals.

=== State of Origin ===
Before his knee injury, Dietrich's form saw him play two State of Origin games for South Australia in 1986, kicking seven goals. This included 4 goals in the Croweaters 18.17 (125) to 17.13 (115) win over Victoria at Football Park in front of 43,143 fans.

=== Millewa Football League return ===
Grenville was the leading goalkicker in the Millewa Football League each year from 1993 to 1996. He now played for Karween Karawinna.

== Retirement ==
Grenville Dietrich still lives in Adelaide with his wife, the couple have two sons Sam and Lachy. He plays lawn bowls for the Rosewater Bowling Club, enjoying the social side of the game which allows him two of his favourite pastimes, smoking and drinking. He also enjoys watching the local football rather than the AFL, believing it to be a "better style of footy" and is better umpired.
