= 1949 SANFL Grand Final =

North Adelaide	West Torrens
13.17 (95)	9.18 (72)
	1	2	3	4
NA	4.7 (31)	6.13 (49)	10.13 (73)	13.17 (95)
WT	2.6 (18)	5.11 (41)	8.15 (63)	9.18 (72)
- Date: Saturday, 1 October
- Stadium: Adelaide Oval
- Attendance: 42,490

The 1949 SANFL Grand Final was an Australian rules football competition. North Adelaide beat West Torrens 95 to 72.

== Teams ==
1949 Premiership Team
B:	Tom MacKenzie (4)	Ian McKay (c) (1)	Frank O’Leary (2)
HB:	Alan Galloway (16)	Frank Crouch (9)	John Blunden (3)
C:	Brian Coulls (11)	Stanley Hancock (7)	Allen Odgers (5)
HF:	Jeff Pash (17)	Ron Phillips (10)	Paul Kennett (15)
F:	Keith Carroll (21)	Dean Stringer (8)	Morrie Arbon (13)
Foll:	Len Pedler (18)	Colin Aamodt (20)	Darcy Cox (14)
Int:	John Tidwell (12)	Don Gilbourne (22)	
Coach:	Ken Farmer		
