= 1952 SANFL Grand Final =

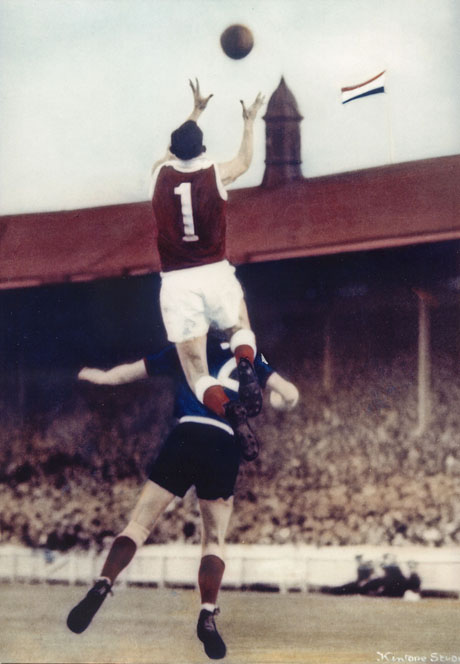

North Adelaide	Norwood
23.15 (153)	6.9 (45)
	1	2	3	4
NTH	3.1 (19)	11.3 (69)	17.10 (112)	23.15 (153)
NOR	2.0 (12)	3.4 (22)	5.5 (35)	6.9 (45)
- Date: Saturday, 4 October (2:10 pm)
- Stadium: Adelaide Oval
- Attendance: 50,105

Accolades
- Best on Ground: Doug Olds

The 1952 SANFL Grand Final was an Australian rules football championship match. North Adelaide beat Norwood 153 to 43.

== Teams ==
1952 Premiership Team
B:	Lloyd Weston (14)	Ian McKay (c) (1)	John Tidswell (15)
HB:	Les Cunningham (22)	Alan Galloway (4)	John Blunden (5)
C:	Merv Way (20)	Lyle Griffin (9)	John Renner (21)
HF:	Don Gilbourne (16)	Geoff Fuller (17)	Paul Kennett (12)
F:	Ron Phillips (2)	Bob Proud (7)	Hubert McKenzie (18)
Foll:	Alan Aldenhoven (3)	Dean Stringer (6)	Darcy Cox (23)
Int:	Keith Carroll (8)	Allen Odgers (10)	
Coach:	Ken Farmer		
