= 1960 SANFL Grand Final =

Norwood	North Adelaide
13.12 (90)	14.11 (95)
	1	2	3	4
NOR	4.2 (26)	7.5 (47)	10.12 (72)	13.12 (90)
NTH	5.5 (35)	8.6 (54)	11.10 (76)	14.11 (95)
- Date: Saturday, 1 October (2:10 pm)
- Stadium: Adelaide Oval
- Attendance: 54,162

The 1960 SANFL Grand Final was an Australian rules football match played at Adelaide Oval on 1 October 1960 to conclude the 1960 SANFL season. North Adelaide beat Norwood 95 to 90. North Adelaide won by 5 points. Norwood had led by 8 points late in the last quarter before North scored 3 goals 1 behind in 5 minutes to take an 11 point lead into time on. Norwood scored a late goal but North then held the ball in their forward lines until the siren sounded just as Norwood were streaming out of defence.

== Teams ==
1960 Premiership Team
B:	Don Gilbourne (c) (1)	Bob Hammond (18)	Theodore "Hank" Lindner (3)
HB:	Brian Gambling (7)	Malcolm Montgomery (4)	Ray Carroll (20)
C:	Ron Hewett (6)	Ray Trenorden (21)	Barrie Barbary (5)
HF:	Malcolm Whitford (10)	Don Lindner (2)	Trevor Hughes (16)
F:	Alwin Faggotter (12)	Bob Pascoe (15)	Barry Potts (8)
Foll:	John Bubner (9)	Barry Kent (11)	Billy Thomas (14)
Int:	Alan Cheek (19)	Peter Bottroff (17)	
Coach:	Jack McCarthy		
