= Percy Furler =

Australian rules footballer and coach

Personal information
- Full name: Percy Stuart Newling Furler
- Nickname: Brone
- Born: 20 February 1904
- Died: 23 January 1991 (aged 86)
- Original team: Noarlunga

Playing career^{1}
Years	Club	Games (Goals)
1922-1933	North Adelaide	187 (152)
Total		187 (152)

Representative team honours^{2}
Years	Team	Games (Goals)
1923, 1928-1933	South Australia	19 (15)
Total		19 (15)

Coaching career^{3}
Years	Club	Games (W–L–D)
1929	North Adelaide	17 (8-8-1)
Total		17 (8-8-1)
- ^{1} Playing statistics correct to the end of 1933.^{2} Representative statistics correct as of 1933.^{3} Coaching statistics correct as of 1929.

Career highlights
- North Adelaide leading goalkicker 1927 (41); 2x North Adelaide premiership player 1930, 1931; North Adelaide captain 1928-1929, 1931-1933; North Adelaide Team of the Century; South Australian Football Hall of Fame Inductee 2002; South Australia captain 1932-1933; 2x Best on Ground SA v Vic 1932, 1933

Percy Stewart Newling Furler (20 February 1904 – 23 January 1991) was an Australian rules footballer who played for and coached North Adelaide in the South Australian National Football League (SANFL). Furler was a key figure in North Adelaide's 1930 and 1931 premierships, including the latter as captain.

Originating from the Noarlunga Football Club in the Southern Football Association, Furler played there together with his four brothers, Ray, Albert, Ross and Leslie, and was rejected by Sturt prior to joining North Adelaide.

In 1947, Furler was appointed Secretary of the North Adelaide Football Club, a position he would only hold for the one season.

In 2002 Furler was an inaugural inductee into the South Australian Football Hall of Fame.

Furler's nephew Bob Furler was also a notable footballer, winning the 1947 Tassie Medal.
