= 1949 SANFL season =

South Australian National Football League season

- Teams: 8
- Premiers: North Adelaide; 7th premiership
- Minor premiers: North Adelaide; 6th minor premiership
- Magarey Medallist: Ron Phillips; North Adelaide; Allan Crabb; Glenelg
- Ken Farmer Medallist: Colin Churchett; Glenelg (72 Goals)

Attendance
- Matches played: 72
- Total attendance: 666,658 (9,259 per match)
- Highest: 42,490 (Grand Final, North Adelaide vs. West Torrens)

The 1949 South Australian National Football League season was the 70th season of the top-level Australian rules football competition in South Australia.

== Ladder ==
1949 SANFL Ladder
Pos	Team	Pld	W	L	D	PF	PA	PP	Pts
1	North Adelaide (P)	17	12	5	0	1616	1301	55.40	24
2	Norwood	17	12	5	0	1698	1471	53.58	24
3	West Torrens	17	11	6	0	1638	1320	55.38	22
4	West Adelaide	17	11	6	0	1580	1378	53.41	22
5	Glenelg	17	8	9	0	1456	1519	48.94	16
6	Port Adelaide	17	7	10	0	1277	1362	48.39	14
7	South Adelaide	17	4	13	0	1392	1791	43.73	8
8	Sturt	17	3	14	0	1139	1645	40.91	6

Rules for classification: 1) points; 2) percentage; 3) number of points for.
(P) Premiers

== Finals ==
=== Grand Final ===
1949 SANFL Grand Final
Saturday 1 October	North Adelaide	def.	West Torrens	Adelaide Oval (crowd: 42,490)	Report
4.7 (31); 6.13 (49); 10.13 (73); 13.17 (95)	Q1; Q2; Q3; Final	2.6 (18); 5.11 (41); 8.15 (63); 9.18 (72)
