= 1967 SANFL season =

- Teams: 10
- Premiers: Sturt; 7th premiership
- Minor premiers: North Adelaide; 9th minor premiership
- Magarey Medallist: Trevor Obst; Port Adelaide; Don Lindner; North Adelaide
- Ken Farmer Medallist: Dennis Sachse; North Adelaide (90 Goals)

Attendance
- Matches played: 104
- Total attendance: 1,090,164 (10,482 per match)
- Highest: 58,849 (Grand Final, Sturt vs. Port Adelaide)

The 1967 South Australian National Football League season was the 88th season of the top-level Australian rules football competition in South Australia.

== Ladder ==
1967 SANFL Ladder
Pos	Team	Pld	W	L	D	PF	PA	PP	Pts
1	North Adelaide	20	16	4	0	2048	1447	58.60	32
2	Sturt (P)	20	15	4	1	2122	1480	58.91	31
3	Port Adelaide	20	14	6	0	1769	1324	57.19	28
4	Glenelg	20	12	8	0	1835	1539	54.39	24
5	South Adelaide	20	11	9	0	1729	1738	49.87	22
6	Norwood	20	10	10	0	1830	1880	49.33	20
7	West Adelaide	20	9	11	0	1780	1722	50.83	18
8	West Torrens	20	6	14	0	1439	1840	43.89	12
9	Central District	20	5	15	0	1199	2019	37.26	10
10	Woodville	20	1	18	1	1450	2212	39.60	3

Rules for classification: 1) points; 2) percentage; 3) number of points for.
(P) Premiers

== Finals Series ==
=== Grand Final ===
1967 SANFL Grand Final
Saturday, 30 September (2:10 pm)	Sturt	def.	Port Adelaide	Adelaide Oval (crowd: 58,849)
5.0 (30); 7.6 (48); 9.6 (60); 13.10 (88)	Q1; Q2; Q3; Final	2.5 (17); 8.9 (57); 9.14 (68); 10.17 (77)
