= Ian McKay (footballer) =

Australian rules footballer (1923–2010)

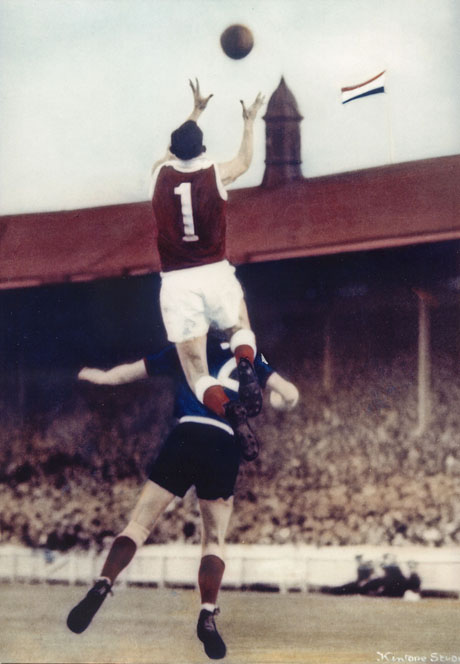

Personal information
- Full name: Ian Lawson McKay
- Born: 9 March 1923; North Adelaide, South Australia
- Died: 3 April 2010 (aged 87)
- Original team: St George

Playing career^{1}
Years	Club	Games (Goals)
1946–1955	North Adelaide	164 (45)
- ^{1} Playing statistics correct to the end of 1955.

Ian Lawson McKay (9 March 1923 – 3 April 2010) was an Australian rules footballer who played with North Adelaide in the SANFL. He played a total of 164 games for North Adelaide.

Recruited from Sydney club St George where he had played during his war service, McKay joined North Adelaide in 1946 and although he started as a centre half back he played at fullback from 1949 until his retirement. McKay was selected to the South Australian interstate side in his debut season, the first of 14 times that he would represent his state. He won the Magarey Medal in 1950, the first fullback to win the award. He captained North Adelaide for eight seasons and led them to premierships in 1949 and 1952, also captaining South Australia twice. In 2000 he was named North Adelaide Team of The Century captain in a team that included Tom Leahy, Ken Farmer, Barrie Robran, Don Lindner, Darren Jarman and Andrew Jarman.

Ian was perhaps the only full back to have the great John Coleman's measure. Prior to Coleman's debut McKay had already proven himself against the "Big V", being chosen by the Victorian selectors as South Australia's best player in the 1946 clash between the states and thus being awarded the O'Halloran Trophy. Coleman and McKay were opposed 4 times and McKay kept Coleman to a tally of 10 goals in the four games at an average of 2.5 goals per game. McKay had the pace to go with Coleman and as freakish as Coleman's marking was McKay probably had an even better leap. No less a judge than Fos Williams stated that one of the main reasons South Australia defeated Victoria in both 1951 and 1952 was McKay's brilliance in curtailing Coleman.

In 1976 respected journalists Mike Coward and Geoff Kingston named South Australia's greatest 40 players of the first 100 years of SANFL football, and named McKay as 9th. He was an inaugural member of the SANFL Hall of Fame yet (as at 2025) has not made the AFL Hall of Fame.

Further in 1977, Merv Agars named South Australia's greatest team of the first 100 years and McKay was named full back.

Prior to official All Australian teams being selected the Sporting Life magazine annually chose an All Australian team and McKay was named full back in both 1951 and 1952. There teams were officially recognised by the AFL for a time.

McKay was also notable for an overhead mark he took in the 1952 SANFL Grand Final against Norwood. The photograph of the mark, by Sunday Mail photographer Bill Teubner, captured McKay's dramatic leap over Norwood's Pat Hall and was reputedly distributed around the world. McKay kicked a goal from that mark, but was hardly decisive: North Adelaide defeated Norwood by a margin of 18 goals – a record for an SANFL grand final.
