= Michael Parsons (Australian footballer) =

Australian rules footballer

Personal information
- Full name: Michael Wayne Parsons
- Born: 3 October 1960; Legana, Tasmania
- Died: 24 April 2009 (aged 48); Sydney, New South Wales, Australia
- Original team: Launceston (NTFA)
- Draft: No. 10, 1987 national draft
- Height: 203 cm (6 ft 8 in)
- Weight: 99 kg (218 lb)
- Position: Ruckman / Forward

Playing career^{1}
Years	Club	Games (Goals)
1988–90	Sydney Swans	25 (14)
1983–87 & 1991-92	North Adelaide	158 (196)
- ^{1} Playing statistics correct to the end of 1992.

Career highlights
- Jack Oatey Medal (1987); North Adelaide premiership player 1987, 1991

Michael Parsons
Personal information
- Listed height: 203 cm (6 ft 8 in)
- Listed weight: 90 kg (200 lb)

Career information
- College: University of Utah
- Playing career: 1980–1983
- Position: Power forward / Centre
- Number: 7

Career history
- 1980–1981: Launceston Casino City
- 1982–1983: West Adelaide Bearcats

Career highlights
- NBL champion (1981)

Michael Wayne Parsons (3 October 1960 – 24 April 2009) was an Australian rules footballer and basketball player who played for the Sydney Swans in the Victorian/Australian Football League (VFL/AFL) and North Adelaide in the South Australian National Football League (SANFL) as well as playing for Launceston Casino City and the West Adelaide Bearcats in the National Basketball League (NBL).

Parsons grew up in Legana, Tasmania where he first played football as a junior with Launceston. He played under ex-St.Kilda defender Roy Apted who coached the young Blues to the 1976 Under 16 premiership in the Northern Tasmanian Junior Football Association (NTJFA).

== Basketball ==
Nicknamed "Bristles" and eventually standing an imposing 6'8" (203 cm) tall, Parsons was also initially a talented basketball player, winning a basketball scholarship to the University of Utah in the late 1970s. Upon returning to Australia in 1980, Parsons was recruited to play for the Launceston Casino City in the fledgeling National Basketball League (1980 was only the NBL's 2nd ever season), most notably he played at Launceston in the 1981 NBL Season when they were the NBL Champions after defeating the Nunawading Spectres 75–54 in the Grand Final at the Apollo Stadium in Adelaide with Parsons scoring the final point of the game with a free throw.

Parsons later moved to Adelaide to continue his studies, where he played for the West Adelaide Bearcats in the NBL, though he ultimately missed playing in the Bearcats 1982 Grand Final win over the Geelong Supercats in Newcastle (NSW).

Michael Parsons played 85 games in the NBL for Launceston (36) and West Adelaide (49), scoring 8.1 points per game and grabbing 4.7 rebounds per game.

== Australian Rules Football ==
While in Adelaide, Parsons was approached by North Adelaide Football Club coach Michael Nunan about the possibility of returning to play Aussie Rules footy. He joined the Roosters in 1983 as a ruckman/forward and is best remembered for his Jack Oatey Medal winning performance in North Adelaide's 1987 SANFL Grand Final win over Glenelg (who had actually beaten Parsons and the Roosters in the 1985 and 1986 Grand Finals).

He was then recruited to Sydney with the tenth pick in the 1987 VFL draft but struggled to make an impact in his three years, although he gathered three Brownlow Medal votes for his 23 disposal effort in a match against the West Coast Eagles midway through his first season.

Parsons returned to North Adelaide in 1991 and finished the year as a member of another premiership winning team as the Roosters defeated West Adelaide by 75 points in a highly spiteful Grand Final where there were numerous all-in brawls.

Michael Parsons retired from playing football at the end of the 1992 SANFL season having played 158 games for North Adelaide, kicking 196 goals and winning 2 SANFL premierships. He also played 25 games and kicked 14 goals for the Sydney Swans in the then VFL from 1988 to 1990

== Post Playing ==
Following his playing career, Parson's joined ABC Television in Adelaide as a commentator for their SANFL telecasts in the mid-late 1990s, mostly working as the Boundary rider during the ABC's Match of the Day telecasts.

In 2008, Parsons suffered a stroke and was revealed to be suffering from a brain tumour. He died in hospital on 24 April 2009.

== Sources ==
- Holmesby, Russell and Main, Jim. The Encyclopedia of AFL Footballers (7th edition). Melbourne: Bas Publishing (2007)
