= 1930 SANFL season =

- Teams: 8
- Premiers: North Adelaide; 5th premiership
- Minor premiers: North Adelaide; 4th minor premiership
- Magarey Medallist: Walter Scott; Norwood (53 votes)
- Ken Farmer Medallist: Ken Farmer; North Adelaide (105 Goals)
- Matches played: 72
- Highest: 23,609 (Grand Final, North Adelaide vs. Port Adelaide)

The 1930 South Australian National Football League season was the 51st season of the top-level Australian rules football competition in South Australia.

== Ladder ==
1930 SANFL Ladder
Pos	Team	Pld	W	L	D	PF	PA	PP	Pts
1	North Adelaide (P)	17	14	3	0	1555	1198	56.48	28
2	Norwood	17	11	5	1	1574	1340	54.02	23
3	Sturt	17	11	6	0	1488	1307	53.24	22
4	Port Adelaide	17	10	6	1	1673	1439	53.76	21
5	West Adelaide	17	8	9	0	1219	1351	47.43	16
6	South Adelaide	17	6	11	0	1470	1645	47.19	12
7	Glenelg	17	4	13	0	1261	1697	42.63	8
8	West Torrens	17	3	14	0	1282	1545	45.35	6

Rules for classification: 1) points; 2) percentage; 3) number of points for.
(P) Premiers

== Finals series ==
=== Grand Final ===
1930 SANFL Grand Final
Saturday, 4 October	North Adelaide	def.	Port Adelaide	Adelaide Oval (crowd: 23,609)
2.7 (19); 6.7 (43); 9.9 (63); 9.13 (67)	Q1; Q2; Q3; Final	2.1 (13); 3.2 (20); 7.7 (49); 9.9 (63)
