= Alan McConnell =

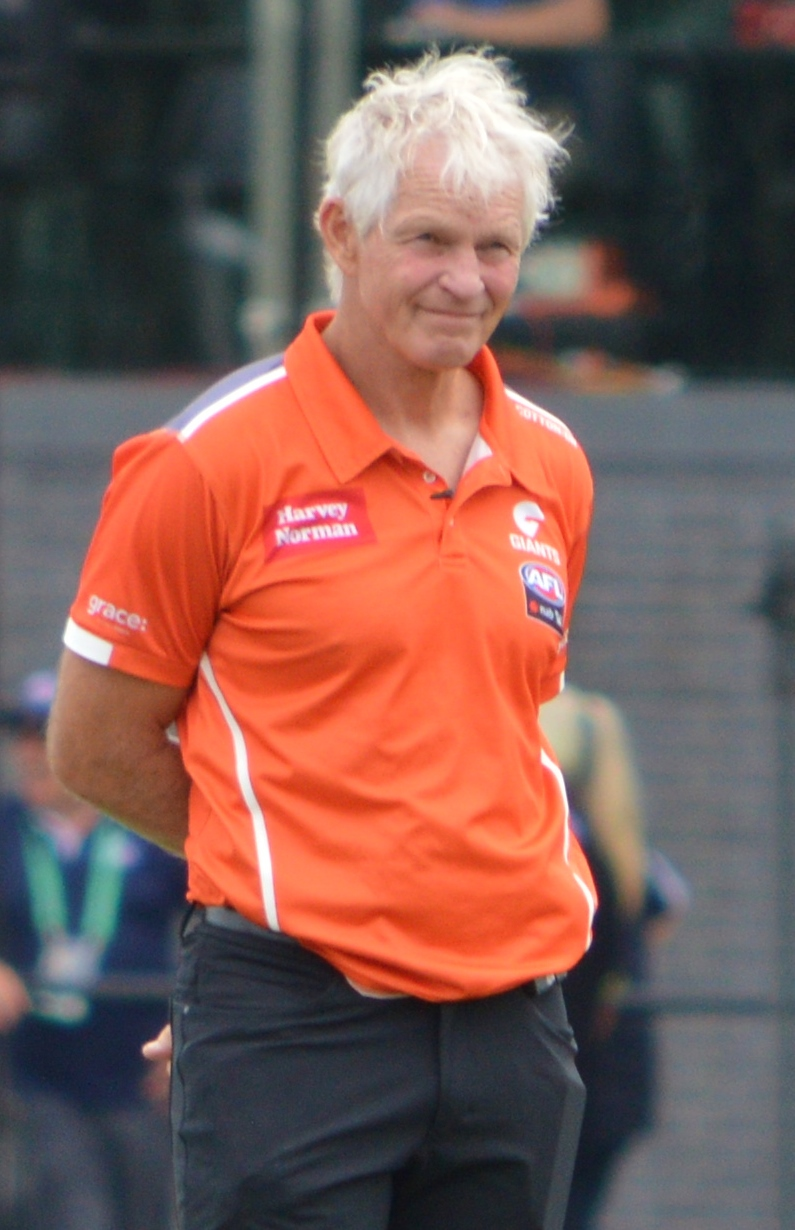
- McConnell coaching the Greater Western Sydney AFLW side in February 2018

Personal information
- Full name: Alan John McConnell
- Born: 30 March 1957 (age 69); Terang
- Original team: Kolora
- Height: 178 cm (5 ft 10 in)
- Weight: 73 kg (161 lb)

Playing career^{1}
Years	Club	Games (Goals)
1980–1982	Footscray	37 (5)

Coaching career^{3}
Years	Club	Games (W–L–D)
1995; 1996	Fitzroy	11 (0–11–0)
2018–2022 (S6)	Greater Western Sydney (W)	40 (17–22–1)
Total		51 (17–33–1)
- ^{1} Playing statistics correct to the end of 1996.^{3} Coaching statistics correct as of 2022 (S6).

Alan John McConnell (born 30 March 1957) is a former Australian rules footballer who played for Footscray in the Victorian Football League (VFL) during the early 1980s and later coached Fitzroy. McConnell is currently serving as director of coaching at the Greater Western Sydney Giants.

== Playing career ==
Originally from Kolora Football Club in the Mount Noorat Football League (MNFL), McConnell played with Terang in the Hampden Football League, under age football with Fitzroy and Victorian Football Association (VFA) football with Preston.

While at Preston in 1980, McConnell represented the VFA in a match against Tasmania before transferring to Footscray Football Club in Victorian Football League (VFL) mid-season.

Gaining a reputation as a fierce defender, McConnell spent three seasons with Footscray, from 1980 to 1982, playing 37 games and kicking 5 goals.

== Coaching career ==
=== Fitzroy Football Club caretaker senior coach (1995), (1996) ===
In 1995, he was appointed as the caretaker senior coach of Fitzroy when Bernie Quinlan was sacked during the season. He again became the caretaker senior coach of Fitzroy, in the following year in the 1996 season for the last eight games when senior coach Michael Nunan stood aside, but he failed to register a win in either season. McConnell then became the last official senior coach of Fitzroy Football Club in the AFL. McConnell left Fitzroy after the 1996 season, when Fitzroy's AFL operations were taken over by the Brisbane Bears to form the Brisbane Lions.

=== Geelong Football Club ===
McConnell then joined Geelong as an assistant coach.

=== Australian Institute of Sport ===
After leaving Geelong, he became the head AFL coach for the Australian Institute of Sport.

=== GWS Giants ===
McConnell later became the first appointment to the Greater Western Sydney Giants as an assistant coach working with the forward line in 2013, McConnell then later became the GWS Director of Coaching under GWS senior coach Leon Cameron. McConnell was appointed the senior coach of the Giants' AFL Women's side in July 2017, becoming the first person to coach both an AFL and AFLW side.

In the round three, 2018 match against Collingwood, McConnell registered his first win in his entire coaching career, having endured eleven losses from as many matches during his two stints as Fitzroy's caretaker senior coach in 1995 and 1996. On 26 March 2022, it was announced that McConnell would step down from his role as senior coach of the Giants' AFL Women's side at the end of the 2022 season and move into another role within the club. However, on 12 April 2022, McConnell reversed this decision and stepped down early from his role as senior coach GWS AFL Women's side effective immediately and was replaced by Cameron Bernasconi.

== Coaching statistics ==
Statistics are correct to the end of the 2023 season

Legend
W	Wins	L	Losses	D	Draws	W%	Winning percentage	LP	Ladder position	LT	League teams

Season	Team	League	Games	W	L	D	W %	LP	LT
1995	Fitzroy	AFL	3	0	3	0	0.0%	16	16
1996	Fitzroy	AFL	8	0	8	0	0.0%	16	16
2018	Greater Western Sydney	AFLW	7	3	3	1	42.9%	4	8
2019	Greater Western Sydney	AFLW	7	2	5	0	28.6%	3^{c}/8^{o} (Note: In 2019 and 2020, the AFLW was split into two conferences. ^{c} denotes the statistic for Greater Western Sydney's conference, while ^{o} denotes the statistic if the conferences were combined.)	5^{c}/10^{o}
2020	Greater Western Sydney	AFLW	7	4	3	0	57.1%	2^{c}/6^{o}	7^{c}/14^{o}
2021	Greater Western Sydney	AFLW	9	4	5	0	44.4%	9	14
2022 (S6)	Greater Western Sydney	AFLW	10	4	6	0	40.0%	9	14
Career			51	17	33	1	33.3%		
