= 2022 SANFL Women's League season =

SANFL Women's League season

2022 SANFL Women's season
- Teams: 8
- Premiers: North Adelaide; 2nd premiership
- Minor premiers: North Adelaide; 3rd minor premiership
- Best and fairest: Jessica Bates; Glenelg (22 votes)
- Leading goalkicker: Alana Lishmund; Norwood (18 goals)

The 2022 SANFL Women's League season was the sixth season of the SANFL Women's League (SANFLW). The season commenced on 4 February and concluded with the Grand Final on 28 May. The competition was contested by eight clubs, all of whom are affiliated with clubs from the men's South Australian National Football League (SANFL).

== Clubs ==
- Central District, Glenelg, North Adelaide, Norwood
- South Adelaide, Sturt, West Adelaide, Woodville-West Torrens

== Ladder ==
Pos	Team	Pld	W	L	D	PF	PA	PP	Pts	Qualification
1	North Adelaide	12	9	3	0	552	310	64.04	18	Finals series
2	Sturt	12	9	3	0	483	285	62.89	18	Finals series
3	Glenelg	12	9	3	0	518	361	58.93	18	Finals series
4	South Adelaide	12	6	6	0	451	377	54.47	12	Finals series
5	Norwood	12	6	6	0	380	472	44.60	12	
6	Central District	12	5	7	0	406	528	43.47	10	
7	Woodville-West Torrens	12	3	9	0	414	473	46.67	6	
8	West Adelaide	12	1	11	0	253	651	27.99	2	

Source: sanfl.com.au
Rules for classification: 1) points; 2) percentage; 3) number of points for.

== Finals series ==
=== First semi-final ===
	First Semi Final
Sunday 15 May (12:30 pm)	Glenelg 5.7 (37)	def.	South Adelaide 3.3 (21)	Prospect Oval

=== Second semi-final ===
	Second Semi Final
Sunday 15 May (2:40 pm)	North Adelaide 11.5 (71)	def.	Sturt 2.2 (14)	Prospect Oval

=== Preliminary final ===
	Preliminary Final
Sunday 22 May (1:40 pm)	Sturt 6.1 (37)	def.	Glenelg 2.8 (20)	Wigan Oval

=== Grand Final ===
2022 SANFLW Grand Final
Saturday 29 May (2:15 pm)	North Adelaide	def.	Sturt	Coopers Stadium
1.1 (7); 3.2 (20); 4.4 (28); 7.6 (48)	Q1; Q2; Q3; Final	3.4 (22); 4.4 (28); 4.6 (30); 4.6 (30)	Umpires: C.Scott, C.Williams, Abbott; Best on ground: Zoe Prowse (Sturt); Television broadcast: Channel 7 Adelaide, 7Plus & SANFL Now
J De Melo 3, M Ryan, H Ewings, J Tabb, D Hansen	Goals	A Rigter 2, I Rasheed 2
E Greet, J De Melo, H Ewings, M Ryan	Best	Z Prowse, K Mueller

== Awards ==
- SANFL Women's Best and Fairest

Jessica Bates – 22 votes (Glenelg)

- Coaches Award

Jessica Bates – 86 votes (Glenelg)

- Leading Goal Kicker Award

Alana Lishmund – 18 goals (Norwood)

- Leadership Award

Alison Ferrall (Norwood)

- Development League Premiers

No finals series or grand final was staged; North Adelaide finished the highest on the ladder at the conclusion of the season.
