= Allan Crabb =

Australian rules footballer (1923–1982)

Personal information
- Full name: Allan John Crabb
- Born: 24 May 1923; Brighton, South Australia
- Died: 11 February 1982 (aged 58)

Playing career^{1}
Years	Club	Games (Goals)
1942–1956	Glenelg (SANFL)	204 (168)
- ^{1} Playing statistics correct to the end of 1956.

Career highlights
- Glenelg Best and Fairest 1949; Glenelg captain 1949, 1955–1956; 20 matches for South Australia; Magarey Medallist 1949 (Runner up 1950); Inducted SANFL Hall of Fame 2002

Allan John "Buster" Crabb (24 May 1923 – 11 February 1982) was an Australian rules footballer best known for his playing career with South Australian National Football League (SANFL) club Glenelg in the 1940s and 1950s.

Crabb was a left-foot ruckman who debuted with the war-time combined West Adelaide-Glenelg side in 1942, and played out his career from 1945 to 1956 with Glenelg. In the process he became one of the most popular and respected footballers in the State .

Jeff Pash, a contemporary and later a sports writer, noted Crabb's outwardly placid nature, yet he was well able to look after himself in the roughhouse world of the ruck. Pash described Crabb's rucking as "both the deft palmer and the solid knocker" and felt that he had "some adventurous quality about him, too – whimsical almost – that leads him to mark one-handed or otherwise do the dangerouse thing, but not at all in any spirit of ostentation".

Crabb represented South Australia against interstate teams for many years; usually in ruck partnership with Norwood's John Marriott. Crabb was runner-up in the Magarey Medal – the highest individual award in the League for the "fairest and most brilliant" player – in both 1949 (on a countback) and 1950. The SANFL in 1998 retrospectively awarded Medals to all players who had lost on countbacks (i.e. had tied for the award but had less first preference votes), thus giving Crabb his reward fifty years later. Crabb also won Glenelg's 1949 best and fairest award, and captained the club for three seasons.
