= 1931 SANFL Grand Final =

North Adelaide	Sturt
17.13 (115)	11.11 (77)
	1	2	3	4
NA	4.3 (27)	8.7 (55)	12.9 (81)	17.13 (115)
STU	2.4 (16)	5.6 (36)	10.8 (68)	11.11 (77)
- Date: Saturday, 3 October
- Stadium: Adelaide Oval
- Attendance: 34,202

The 1931 SANFL Grand Final was an Australian rules football competition. North Adelaide beat Sturt 115 to 77.

== Teams ==
1931 Premiership Team
B:	Bob Barrett (12)	Harry Fleet (11)	Ray Munn (23)
HB:	Bert Mangelsdorf (8)	Stan Burton (24)	Darrell Conrad (5)
C:	Norm Drew (7)	Stan Lock (19)	Jack MacKay (3)
HF:	Robert Taylor (6)	Harold Hawke (14)	Brian Burns (8)
F:	Percy Furler (c) (1)	Ken Farmer (9)	Norman Proud (15)
Foll:	Clarrie Willshire (22)	Don Phillis (16)	Garfield Storer (10)
Int:	George Foulis (13)		
Coach:	Percy Lewis		
