= 2020 SANFL Women's League season =

2020 SANFL Women's season
- Teams: 8
- Premiers: North Adelaide; 1st premiership
- Minor premiers: North Adelaide; 2nd minor premiership
- Best and fairest: Anne Hatchard; North Adelaide; Rachelle Martin; West Adelaide (15 votes each)
- Leading goalkicker: Jess Kirk; South Adelaide (10 goals)

The 2020 SANFL Women's League season was the fourth season of the SANFL Women's League (SANFLW). The season commenced on 14 February and concluded with the Grand Final on 23 August. The competition was contested by eight clubs, all of whom were affiliated with clubs from the men's South Australian National Football League (SANFL). Following the fourth round of competition, the season was suspended for over three months due to the impact of the COVID-19 pandemic, though upon resumption in June the season continued uninterrupted and concluded in late August 2020.

== Clubs ==
- Central District
- Glenelg
- North Adelaide
- Norwood
- South Adelaide
- Sturt
- West Adelaide
- Woodville-West Torrens

== Ladder ==
Pos	Team	Pld	W	L	D	PF	PA	PP	Pts	Qualification
1	North Adelaide (P)	10	10	0	0	598	135	81.58	20	Finals series
2	South Adelaide	10	9	1	0	389	206	65.38	18	Finals series
3	Norwood	10	5	3	2	329	305	51.89	12	Finals series
4	West Adelaide	10	5	4	1	291	220	56.95	11	Finals series
5	Glenelg	10	3	7	0	305	356	46.14	6	
6	Sturt	10	2	7	1	148	442	25.08	5	
7	Woodville-West Torrens	10	2	8	0	234	376	38.36	4	
8	Central District	10	2	8	0	200	454	30.58	4	

Source: australianfootball.com
Rules for classification: 1) points; 2) percentage; 3) number of points for.
(P) Premiers

== Finals series ==
=== First semi-final ===
	First semi-final
Sunday 9 August (12:20 pm)	Norwood 2.3 (15)	def. by	West Adelaide 9.4 (58)	Thebarton Oval	Report

=== Second semi-final ===
	Second semi-final
Sunday 9 August (10:30 am)	North Adelaide 3.7 (25)	def.	South Adelaide 2.5 (17)	Thebarton Oval	Report

=== Preliminary final ===
	Second semi-final
Sunday 16 August (11:30 am)	South Adelaide 6.6. (42)	def.	West Adelaide 1.6 (12)	Thebarton Oval	Report

=== Grand Final ===
2020 SANFLW Grand Final
Sunday 23 August (11:30 am)	North Adelaide	def.	South Adelaide	Thebarton Oval
2.2. (14); 4.2 (26); 5.5 (35); 5.5 (35)	Q1; Q2; Q3; Final	2.0 (12); 3.1 (19); 3.2 (20); 4.4 (28)	Umpires: Whittlesea, Allen, Cuming; Best on ground: Anne Hatchard (North Adelaide); Television broadcast: SANFL.com.au
C. Castle 2, B. Perry 2 H. Ewings 1	Goals	G. Schirmer, I. Tahau, N. Gore, T. Charlton 1
A. Hatchard, E. Sundstrom, K. Pope, B. Perry, A. Ward, C. Taylor	Best	L. Buchanan, L. Northcott, G. Schirmer, L. Whiteley
North Adelaide won their first senior women's premiership.
