= Fred Bills =

Playing career
Years	Club	Games (Goals)
1959–1975	West Torrens	313 (58)

Career highlights
- South Australian Football Hall of Fame (2002)

Fred Bills (1942 – 18 March 2018) was an Australian rules footballer for the West Torrens Football Club in the South Australian National Football League. A ruckman, he played 313 games for the club
