= 1930 SANFL Grand Final =

Port Adelaide	North Adelaide
9.9 (63)	9.13 (67)
	1	2	3	4
PTA	2.1 (13)	3.2 (20)	7.7 (49)	9.9 (63)
NA	2.7 (19)	6.7 (43)	9.9 (63)	9.13 (67)
- Date: Saturday, 4 October (2:10 pm)
- Stadium: Adelaide Oval
- Attendance: 23,609
- Coin toss won by: Port Adelaide

The 1930 SANFL Grand Final was an Australian rules football competition. North Adelaide beat Port Adelaide 67 to 64.

== Teams ==
1930 Premiership Team
B:	George Foulis (12)	Harry Fleet (11)	Ron May (21)
HB:	Robert Taylor (6)	Bert Mangelsdorf (18)	Darrell Conrad (5)
C:	Norm Drew (7)	Stan Lock (19)	Garfield Storer (10)
HF:	Sid Burton (24)	Clarrie Willshire (22)	Harold Hawke (14)
F:	Bob Barrett (12)	Ken Farmer (9)	James McDowall (c) (1)
Foll:	Percy Furler (2)	Ray Munn (23)	William Thomas (8)
Int:	Frederick Hardwick (17)		
Coach:	Percy Lewis		
