= Barrie Barbary =

Australian rules footballer (1939–2023)

Personal information
- Born: 10 February 1939
- Died: 11 February 2023 (aged 84)

Playing career^{1}
Years	Club	Games (Goals)
1957–1964	North Adelaide	146 (63)
1967–1970	Woodville	
Total		213

Coaching career
Years	Club	Games (W–L–D)
1972–1973	Woodville	
- ^{1} Playing statistics correct to the end of 1970.

Career highlights
- Two time North Adelaide best and fairest 1960, 1964; Member of North Adelaide premiership team 1960; Represented South Australia 18 times; Magarey Medalist, 1960; Inductee, South Australian Football Hall of Fame, 2002; Wingman in North Adelaide's official 'Team of the Century'; O'Halloran Trophy (Best on ground vs. Victoria) 1963

Barrie Barbary (10 February 1939 – 11 February 2023) was an Australian rules footballer who played 213 games for North Adelaide and Woodville in the SANFL between 1957 – 1970. He was the 1960 Magarey Medalist and had a 14-year SANFL career. He is also a cousin to John Cahill and Darrell Cahill.

== North Adelaide playing career ==
Combining solidity of build with enormous pace and superb ball handling ability, Barrie Barbary was a most damaging player for North Adelaide. After displaying consistent brilliance all year, he earned the 1960 Magarey Medal, and backed this up with a premiership medal as well, as North held off a stern challenge from Norwood to win by 5 points.

Jeff Pash, former footballer and then journalist with "The News", reflected on his 1960 season:

As a footballer, he must please the most severe critic; his play is based on the solid, boring rush forward, complete technical mastery of his craft, and a serene, Bunton-like concentration. Strength plus dexterity makes for the brilliant effects.

=== State representative ===
In his debut SANFL season he impressed enough to earn interstate selection and would go on to represent South Australia 18 times. In 1963 Barbary was part of arguably South Australia's greatest ever state team that overcame Victoria at the MCG. The game was a fierce, uncompromising and close encounter, with the South Australians getting home in a tense and thrilling last quarter by 7 points, in front of a 59,260 fans. South Australian coach Foster Williams stated "the win is the climax to my football career".

In a match featuring superstars Ron Barassi, Kevin Murray, John Nicholls, Graham 'Polly' Farmer, Darrel Baldock, Brian Dixon, Doug Wade, Sergio Silvagni, Noel Teasdale, Alistair Lord, Lindsay Head, John Halbert, Neil Kerley, Don Lindner, Bill Wedding, Robert Day, John Cahill, Ken Eustice, Geof Motley, John Halbert, Ron Benton, and Neil Hawke, Barbary put in the best on ground performance, earning the O'Halloran Trophy. The Adelaide Advertiser reported on Barbary's performance:

At the MCG on Saturday his speed, tenacity and sure ball-handling were dominating factors in SA's seven point win over Victoria. As SA's best player, chosen by the Victorian selectors, Barbary won the trophy given by a leading oil company...... A steadfast refusal to admit defeat and the ability to gain possession against overwhelming odds are two of Barbary's greatest attributes. Barbary knows his capabilities, exploits his skill to the full and lifts the morale of his teammates with his courageous and dashing approach.

== SANFL Retirement ==
Barbary retired from the SANFL at the end of 1964. He played country football, as captain-coach of Kybybolite, in the Kowree Naracoorte Football League and won two successive Mail Medals in 1965 and 1966.

== Woodville FC ==
In 1967 Barbary returned to the SANFL, joining the Woodville Football Club. He played 66 senior games, his experience and well-practiced skills being valuable to a young side. In 1971, Barbary captain-coached Woodville's seconds side, before being appointed non-playing coach of senior team for seasons 1972 and 1973. Woodville won the Coca-Cola Cup in 1972 and a young Malcolm Blight won the Magarey Medal in the same year.

== Honours cited in Hall of Fame Induction ==
- Member of premiership side of North Adelaide 1960
- Played 18 matches for South Australia
- Magarey Medallist, 1960
- Two time North Adelaide best and fairest
- O'Halloran Trophy 1963
- Coached Woodville 1972, 1973

On 23 August 2000, Barbary was awarded the Australian Sports Medal for being a recipient of the highest individual honour in South Australian Football.

== External sources ==
- Gordon Schwartz (21 June 1963). "The Advertiser".
- Pash, Jeff; Depasquale, Paul (1999). The Pash papers : Australian Rules football in South Australia, 1950–1964. The News. ISBN 0-908065-48-5.
