= Tyson Slattery =

Australian rules footballer (born 1990)

Personal information
- Full name: Tyson Slattery
- Born: 3 December 1990 (age 35)
- Original team: West Adelaide
- Draft: No. 67, 2008 National Draft, Essendon
- Height: 185 cm (6 ft 1 in)
- Weight: 80 kg (176 lb)
- Position: Defender

Playing career^{1}
Years	Club	Games (Goals)
2010	Essendon	1 (1)
- ^{1} Playing statistics correct to the end of Round 14, 2010.

Tyson Slattery (born 3 December 1990) is an Australian rules footballer who was drafted by Essendon in the fifth round of the 2008 AFL draft. He is the son of Wayne Slattery, a former St Kilda player.

After playing for all of 2009 and most of 2010 for the Bendigo Bombers in the Victorian Football League, Slattery made his AFL debut for Essendon in Round 14 of the 2010 AFL season. He was involved in a controversial shepherd on Adelaide's Bernie Vince, although no charges were laid. He dropped back to the VFL the following week, staying there for the rest of the season.
