= Josh Francou =

Australian rules footballer

Personal information
- Born: 7 August 1974 (age 52)
- Original team: North Adelaide
- Debut: Round 1, 29 March 1997, Port Adelaide vs. Collingwood, at MCG

Playing career^{1}
Years	Club	Games (Goals)
1997–2006	Port Adelaide	156 (72)
- ^{1} Playing statistics correct to the end of 2005.

Career highlights
- Club: Player in Port Adelaide's AFL debut (1997); Representative: All-Australian 2002; International Rules Series 2001, 2002; Honours: 2nd Brownlow Medal 2002; 3rd (equal) Brownlow Medal 2001; Magarey Medal 1996; 4x Showdown Medal; 2x Merv Agars Medal 1999, 2002

Joshua Francou (born 7 August 1974) is a former professional Australian rules footballer in the Australian Football League (AFL). He is currently serving as the head coach of the North Adelaide Football Club in the South Australian National Football League (SANFL).

== Port Adelaide (1997–2006) ==
Debuting with Port Adelaide as a 22-year-old, Francou was part of Port Adelaide's inaugural team. He was one of the club's best players, playing every game, averaging a respectable 15 disposals per game as well as kicking 16 goals for the year. He played every game the next season also, averaging 16 disposals. In the 1999 season, Francou missed out on just three games. Port Adelaide played in their first final in that year, losing to the Kangaroos by 44 points.

The 2000 season was a good one for Francou, averaging 22 creative disposals a match. He continued to average over 20 disposals the next season, kicking 7 goals in both years. In 2002, he once again averaged over 20 disposals, and for the first time since 1998, played in all games.

== Injuries and retirement (2003–2006) ==
In his early career in the SANFL, Francou dislocated his left knee so badly, that it bent 90 degrees, which forced him out of the game for over a year. In recent times, he has been ravaged with knee-reconstructions, one in just his second game of the year in 2003, and then another injury to his other good knee in Pre-Season 2004. He was able to play every game except one in 2005 (despite battling osteitis pubis). He injured both his left and right knee.

On 23 August 2006, Francou announced his retirement after playing only 23 games since his knee reconstruction in 2003, and no games in his final year (2006).

== Since retirement (2006– ) ==
Josh joined radio station 5AA, replacing Russell Ebert as special comments commentator. He also wrote for the Adelaide Advertiser.

Josh Francou has also worked as a part-time Physical Education teacher at Banksia Park International High School and Pulteney Grammar School in South Australia – and taught full-time at Prince Alfred College and St Peter's College, Adelaide.

Josh was an assistant coach at the Gold Coast Suns in the AFL, joining in 2019. Josh has also been an assistant coach for both Sydney Swans and the Adelaide Crows. He was re-appointed as head coach of North Adelaide Football Club in August 2025, after previously coaching them from 2011 to 2013.

Francou's son, Oliver, plays for the West Coast Eagles.

== Statistics ==
Legend
G	Goals	K	Kicks	D	Disposals	T	Tackles
B	Behinds	H	Handballs	M	Marks

Season	Team	No.	Games	Totals							Averages (per game)							Votes
Season	Team	No.	Games	G	B	K	H	D	M	T	G	B	K	H	D	M	T	Votes
1997	Port Adelaide	10	22	16	15	214	122	336	54	44	0.7	0.7	9.7	5.5	15.3	2.5	2.0	1
1998	Port Adelaide	10	22	12	15	243	154	397	50	54	0.5	0.7	11.0	7.0	18.0	2.3	2.5	7
1999	Port Adelaide	10	20	10	8	224	168	392	42	48	0.5	0.4	11.2	8.4	19.6	2.1	2.4	6
2000	Port Adelaide	10	20	7	10	237	192	429	34	46	0.4	0.5	11.9	9.6	21.5	1.7	2.3	8
2001	Port Adelaide	10	22	7	7	308	224	532	67	81	0.3	0.3	14.0	10.2	24.2	3.0	3.7	19
2002	Port Adelaide	10	25	13	13	259	269	528	42	100	0.5	0.5	10.4	10.8	21.1	1.7	4.0	21
2003	Port Adelaide	10	2	0	0	8	15	23	4	5	0.0	0.0	4.0	7.5	11.5	2.0	2.5	0
2004	Port Adelaide	10	0	—	—	—	—	—	—	—	—	—	—	—	—	—	—	—
2005	Port Adelaide	10	23	7	13	179	204	383	70	82	0.3	0.6	7.8	8.9	16.7	3.0	3.6	5
Career			156	72	81	1672	1348	3020	363	460	0.5	0.5	10.7	8.6	19.4	2.3	2.9	67
