= Darren Wilson (umpire) =

Australian rules football boundary umpire

Darren Wilson (born 21 September 1974) is a former Australian rules football boundary umpire and current boundary umpire coach. He is also an elite stair climber who won the 2016 Empire State Building Run-Up.

== Umpiring career ==
=== SANFL ===
Wilson umpired the 1992, 1993, and 1997 SANFL grand finals.

=== AFL ===
Wilson made his Australian Football League debut as a boundary umpire in 1992, the youngest umpire ever as of 2023.

Wilson umpired the 1998 AFL Grand Final between Adelaide and North Melbourne. By 2009, he had umpired 12 consecutive AFL Grand Finals, a record; this feat also simultaneously set a new record for the number of grand finals umpired.

Wilson was inducted into the South Australian Football Hall of Fame in 2022. In 2021, he was made a life member; he is the only AFL life member who is a boundary umpire.

He became the inaugural AFLW boundary umpires coach for 2017–18, and he was the AFL national boundary umpire coach from 2019 to now.
