= Tom MacKenzie =

Australian rules footballer

Personal information
- Full name: Thomas David MacKenzie
- Born: 4 October 1882; Adelaide, South Australia
- Died: 28 November 1927 (aged 45); Southwark, South Australia
- Position: Centreman

Playing career^{1}
Years	Club	Games (Goals)
1900–04, 1909–14	West Torrens	121 (45)
1905–1908	North Adelaide	54 (4)
Total		175 (49)
- ^{1} Playing statistics correct to the end of 1914.

Career highlights
- Captain of West Torrens, 1911–1913; 1905 premiership player; Triple Magarey Medallist – 1902, 1905 and 1906; South Australian representative 20 matches

Thomas David MacKenzie (4 October 1882 – 28 November 1927) was an Australian rules footballer in the (then) South Australian Football Association (SAFA)/South Australian Football League (SAFL).

MacKenzie was the first man to win three Magarey Medals as the fairest and most brilliant player in the competition. He played as a calm centreman who did well under pressure.

He later served in World War I, being wounded several times while fighting in France.

In 1996 MacKenzie was inducted into the Australian Football Hall of Fame. In 2002 he was inducted into the South Australian Football Hall of Fame.
