= Dale Woodhall =

Australian rules footballer (born 1961)

Personal information
- Full name: Dale William Edward Woodhall
- Born: 11 March 1961 (age 65)
- Height: 183 cm (6 ft 0 in)
- Weight: 80 kg (176 lb)
- Position: Full-forward

Playing career^{1}
| Years | Club | Games (Goals) |
| 1977–1983 | Mayne | |
| 1984 | Collingwood | 12 (32) |
| 1985–1987 | West Adelaide | |
| 1988– | Mayne | 142 (537) |
- ^{1} Playing statistics correct to the end of final.

Dale William Edward Woodhall (born 11 March 1961) is a former Australian rules footballer who played with Collingwood in the Victorian Football League (VFL).

Although he had only just turned 23 when he started playing for Collingwood, Woodhall was already a three time Queensland Australian Football League leading goal-kicker. His 85 goals in his debut QAFL season in 1977 saw him finish second behind Owen Backwell but he topped the league's tables with 81 goals in 1979, 92 goals in 1982 and 113 goals in 1983.

He joined Collingwood in 1982, having previously being signed by South Melbourne back in 1978 only to remain in Brisbane. The full-forward was a multiple goal scorer in all but two of his VFL games and kicked a league best seven goals in a match against the Sydney Swans at Victoria Park, before being benched in the next game against Carlton due to only getting one kick and no goals. His 32 goals for the season was bettered at Collingwood only by Mark Williams. A Queensland interstate football representative on ten occasions, Woodhall finished his career back at Mayne.

Woodhall went with coach John Cahill to West Adelaide in 1985 and played some good football. He kicked 11 goals in a match against Woodville in 1987, but West Adelaide still lost.
