= Steven Hamilton =

Australian rules footballer

Personal information
- Full name: Steven Kerry Hamilton
- Born: 7 September 1970 (age 56)
- Original team: North Adelaide
- Draft: No. 74, 1988 national draft
- Height: 180 cm (5 ft 11 in)
- Weight: 75 kg (165 lb)

Playing career^{1}
Years	Club	Games (Goals)
1990	North Melbourne	6 (1)
- ^{1} Playing statistics correct to the end of 1990.

Steven Kerry Hamilton (born 7 September 1970) is a former Australian rules footballer who played with North Melbourne in the Australian Football League (AFL).

Hamilton was selected by North Melbourne at pick 74 in the 1988 National Draft, from North Adelaide. He made six appearances in the 1990 AFL season and received two Brownlow Medal votes for his efforts in a win over Fitzroy at Princes Park. Hamilton returned to North Adelaide in 1991 and was a member of their premiership team that year. He joined West Adelaide in 1994.
