= Doug Olds =

Australian rules footballer

Douglas William Olds (3 April 1927 – 27 April 1994) was an Australian rules footballer who played in the South Australian National Football League ('SANFL') for the Norwood Football Club from 1944 to 1957 and coached them in 1963 and 1964. He was an inaugural inductee in the South Australian Football Hall of Fame.
