= Wayne Slattery (footballer) =

Australian rules footballer

Personal information
- Born: 22 October 1960 (age 66)
- Original team: South Adelaide (SANFL)
- Debut: 27 March 1982, St Kilda vs. Hawthorn, at Moorabbin Oval
- Height: 173 cm (5 ft 8 in)
- Weight: 73 kg (161 lb)

Playing career^{1}
Years	Club	Games (Goals)
1977-81 & 1983-86	South Adelaide	170 (230)
1982	St Kilda	11 (12)
1987-88	North Adelaide	19 (19)
Total		200 (261)
- ^{1} Playing statistics correct to the end of 1982.

Wayne Slattery is a former professional Australian rules footballer who played for South Adelaide Football Club in the South Australian National Football League (SANFL) and St Kilda Football Club in the Victorian Football League (VFL).

Slattery debuted with South Adelaide in 1977 as a sixteen-year-old and played in the 1979 SANFL Grand Final, which South Adelaide lost to Port Adelaide Football Club. VFL club St Kilda recruited him for the 1982 season but injuries restricted Slattery to 11 games.

Slattery returned to South Adelaide in 1983, and left at the end of 1986, having played a total of 170 SANFL games for the club.

He transferred to the North Adelaide Football Club in 1987 and was a member of their premiership team that year. He retired after the 1988 pre-season cup, having played 19 games for the club.

Slattery's son Tyson Slattery played for Australian Football League (AFL) club Essendon.
