= Bob Hammond =

Australian rules footballer (1942–2020)

- Hammond in his North Adelaide playing days

Personal information
- Full name: Robert Allen Hammond
- Born: 16 February 1942; Perth, Western Australia
- Died: 30 May 2020 (aged 78); Adelaide, South Australia
- Original team: Kilburn
- Position: Key defender

Playing career^{1}
Years	Club	Games (Goals)
1960–1973	North Adelaide	234 (69)
1974	Norwood	14 (0)
Total		248 (68)

Coaching career
Years	Club	Games (W–L–D)
1974-1979	Norwood	141 (89–52–0)
1984	Sydney Swans	8 (3–5–0)
- ^{1} Playing statistics correct to the end of 1974.

Career highlights
- Australian Football Hall of Fame inductee 2015

Robert Allen Hammond AM (16 February 1942 – 30 May 2020) was an Australian rules footballer who played for North Adelaide and Norwood in the South Australian National Football League (SANFL) during the 1960s and early 1970s. He later served as coach of the Sydney Swans in the Victorian Football League (VFL).

Hammond played his early football at Kilburn before being recruited to North Adelaide. He took a while to break into the senior side but when he did in 1960 he was a member of their premiership team. A key defender, he also participated in North Adelaide's premiership years of 1971/72 and played in the club's 1972 Championship of Australia win.

While at North Adelaide he represented South Australia at an interstate level in a win over Victoria in 1963, one of eight times that he would appear for his state.

Norwood lured Hammond to their club in 1974 as captain-coach and he went on to have success. After retiring as a player at the end of his initial season, Hammond steered them to premierships in 1975 and 1978.

His coaching career continued at the interstate level and he was in charge of the South Australian team which defeated Victoria for the first time at State of Origin level, in 1983. The following year he coached the Sydney Swans in eight games during the 1984 VFL season after Ricky Quade resigned and Tony Franklin was a caretaker coach for a single game. Hammond initially said he would have been interested in continuing as Swan coach, but his business interests in Adelaide supermarkets forced him to resign in the second week after his final match with the club.

From 1991 to 2000, Hammond served as the chairman of the Adelaide Football Club, a tenure during which they won two premierships.

In 2001 he was named as a back pocket in North Adelaide's official Team of the Century, then in 2002 was inducted into the South Australian Football Hall of Fame, followed by the AFL Hall of Fame in 2015. He was made a Member of the Order of Australia in June 2003.
