= Darren Jarman =

Australian rules footballer (born 1967)

Personal information
- Full name: Darren Robert Jarman
- Born: 28 January 1967 (age 59)
- Original team: North Adelaide (SANFL)
- Draft: No. 55, 1986 national draft
- Height: 186 cm (6 ft 1 in)
- Weight: 96 kg (15 st 2 lb)
- Position: Midfielder/forward

Playing career^{1}
Years	Club	Games (Goals)
1985–1990	North Adelaide (SANFL)	144 (237) (Note: These tallies include all SANFL matches as decreed by the SANFL)
1991–1995	Hawthorn	109 (122)
1996–2001	Adelaide	121 (264)
Total		374 (621)

Representative team honours
Years	Team	Games (Goals)
	South Australia	12
- ^{1} Playing statistics correct to the end of 2001.

Career highlights
- AFL: 3× AFL Premiership player: (1991, 1997, 1998); 3× All-Australian team: (1992, 1995, 1996); Peter Crimmins Memorial Trophy: (1995); 3× Adelaide leading goalkicker: (1998, 1999, 2001); South Australian Football Hall of Fame, inducted 2006; Australian Football Hall of Fame, inducted 2007; Adelaide Team of the Decade – forward pocket; SANFL: SANFL premiership: 1987; North Adelaide best and fairest: 1990; North Adelaide leading goalkicker: 1990; North Adelaide Team of the Century; Representative: National Football Carnival Championship: 1993

Darren Robert Jarman (born 28 January 1967) is a former Australian rules footballer who played for the Hawthorn Football Club and Adelaide Football Club in the Australian Football League (AFL), and for the North Adelaide Football Club in the South Australian National Football League (SANFL).

Jarman is recognised, along with older brother Andrew, as one of the most skillful South Australian footballers of the late 1980s and 1990s. While Andrew was renowned for his constructive handball skills, Darren was regarded as one of the finest kicks on either foot, whether passing to a leading forward or shooting for goal.

== SANFL career (1985–1990) ==
Jarman played 144 games and kicked 237 goals for North Adelaide in the SANFL between 1985 and 1990. The highlight of this period was playing in the 1987 SANFL Grand Final premiership victory with brother Andrew. He was selected on the interchange in the club's Team of the Century at a gala dinner held on 7 October 2000. He also played 27 night series/pre-season competition matches for North Adelaide, in which he kicked 25 goals.

== Hawthorn (1991–1995) ==
Jarman was initially drafted by Melbourne with pick 55 in the inaugural 1986 VFL Draft., but chose to remain in Adelaide with the Roosters. Once the Demons' three-year rights to Jarman lapsed, Brisbane claimed him with a concessional pre-draft selection in the 1989 VFL Draft. Once again Jarman chose to stay in his home state.

In 1990 the turmoil that led to the creation of the Adelaide Crows and thereby automatically relegated the SANFL to secondary importance within South Australia caused Jarman to reassess his career. Following some friction with the Crows' football manager Neil Kerley, Jarman chose to head east, signing for Hawthorn after the club traded pick 10 in the 1990 AFL draft to the Bears for his contractual rights.

In Round 1, 1991 Jarman made his debut in an 86-point loss to Adelaide. Despite this early setback, the highly skilled midfielder made an immediate impact in his debut year, averaging 18 disposals and booting 41 goals before his infamous performance in the Hawks' winning side on Grand Final day, when he was restricted to just 5 touches on the big stage.

Jarman bounced back in 1992, winning his first All-Australian selection (at centreman) and stamping himself as one of the game's elite players. Following his excellent 1995 season where he won his second All-Australian selection, Hawthorn's Best and Fairest Award and finished with the second-most votes behind Sydney's Paul Kelly in the Brownlow Medal count (Note: Jarman was however ineligible to place due to a suspension incurred in the opening round.)Jarman sought a return home to Adelaide to play with his brother Andrew at the Crows.

== Homecoming (1996–2001) ==
In the 1995/6 offseason, Jarman was traded to the Adelaide Crows in a complex three-way deal that involved Paul Salmon moving from Essendon to Hawthorn, promising defender Sean Wellman moving from Adelaide to Essendon and a handful of peripheral draft picks and players exchanged between the three clubs.

As with his move to Glenferrie Oval five years earlier, Jarman had an immediate impact at his new club, winning his third All-Australian selection following a 400 disposal/46 goal season despite playing just 19 games. In the following years as he passed the age of 30, Jarman increasingly spent more time up forward, capturing the imagination of fans everywhere with remarkable performances in the Crows' back-to-back Grand Final wins, booting six goals against St Kilda in 1997 (Note: Five of these 1997 Grand Final goals were in the last quarter.) and five goals in the 1998 triumph over North Melbourne. Jarman's influence as a goalsneak in the twilight of his career was highlighted by his capture of the Crows' leading goalkicker award in 1998, 1999 and 2001.

In 2000 Jarman was named in the forward pocket in Adelaide's Team of the Decade 1991–2000.

== Playing statistics ==
Legend
G	Goals	K	Kicks	D	Disposals	T	Tackles
B	Behinds	H	Handballs	M	Marks

Season	Team	No.	Games	Totals							Averages (per game)						
Season	Team	No.	Games	G	B	K	H	D	M	T	G	B	K	H	D	M	T
1991	Hawthorn	11	24	41	28	297	136	433	74	39	1.7	1.2	12.4	5.7	18.0	3.1	1.6
1992	Hawthorn	11	23	30	30	395	148	543	112	49	1.3	1.3	17.2	6.4	23.6	4.9	2.1
1993	Hawthorn	11	21	24	15	319	141	460	117	63	1.1	0.7	15.2	6.7	21.9	5.6	3.0
1994	Hawthorn	11	21	16	11	304	157	461	95	83	0.8	0.5	14.5	7.5	22.0	4.5	4.0
1995	Hawthorn	11	20	11	11	346	127	473	67	71	0.6	0.6	17.3	6.4	23.7	3.4	3.6
1996	Adelaide	3	19	46	17	286	112	398	96	42	2.4	0.9	15.1	5.9	20.9	5.1	2.2
1997	Adelaide	3	24	39	17	381	125	506	104	67	1.6	0.7	15.9	5.2	21.1	4.3	2.8
1998	Adelaide	3	23	45	29	230	101	331	90	41	2.0	1.3	10.0	4.4	14.4	3.9	1.8
1999	Adelaide	3	21	58	23	179	63	242	96	18	2.8	1.1	8.5	3.0	11.5	4.6	0.9
2000	Adelaide	3	14	36	12	131	48	179	53	20	2.6	0.9	9.4	3.4	12.8	3.8	1.4
2001	Adelaide	3	20	40	17	217	64	281	85	17	2.0	0.9	10.9	3.2	14.1	4.3	0.9
Career			230	386	210	3085	1222	4307	989	510	1.7	0.9	13.4	5.3	18.7	4.3	2.2

== Retirement and recognition ==
An emotional Jarman retired after the 2001 Elimination Final loss to Carlton, closing the book on his playing career with a further 2 goals.

After being inducted into the SANFL Hall of Fame in 2006, on 19 July 2007 Jarman's outstanding 17-season career of top-flight football was recognised with induction into the Australian Football Hall of Fame.

Jarman was awarded Life Membership of the Adelaide Football Club in March 2008.

== Coaching career ==
From 2002 to 2004 Jarman re-joined the Adelaide Football Club as an assistant coach to Gary Ayres. In 2006 he was appointed assistant coach to brother Andrew Jarman at North Adelaide, ending in 2007.

== Personal life ==
In March 2023, Jarman, alongside former AFL player Jay Schulz and the family of former AFL player Shane Tuck, launched a class action lawsuit in the Supreme Court of Victoria against the AFL and the Richmond, Port Adelaide, Hawthorn and Adelaide football clubs, with the plaintiffs alleging that the defendants failed to ensure proper concussion management during the plaintiffs' playing careers.
