= North Adelaide Football Club =

Australian rules football club

North Adelaide Football club

Names
- Full name: North Adelaide Football Club
- Nickname: Roosters
- Former nickname(s): Dindies (1880s - Short form of Medindie); Dingoes (1890s)

2025 season
- After finals: 9th
- Home-and-away season: 9th
- Leading goalkicker: Frank Szekely (30) - 2025
- Best and fairest: TBA

Club details
- Founded: 1881; 145 years ago
- Colours: Red and White
- Competition: South Australian National Football League
- President: Kris Mooney
- CEO: Keenan Ramsey
- Coach: Josh Francou
- Captain: Alex Spina
- Premierships: SANFL (14) (1900, 1902, 1905, 1920, 1930, 1931, 1949, 1952, 1960, 1971, 1972, 1987, 1991, 2018); SANFLW (2) (2020, 2022); WWII Patriotic League (2): 1943, 1944 (as Norwood-North Adelaide)
- Ground: Prospect Oval (capacity: 20,000)

Uniforms
Home

Other information
- Official website: nafc.com.au

The North Adelaide Football Club, nicknamed the Roosters, is an Australian rules football club affiliated with the South Australian National Football League (SANFL) and SANFL Women's League (SANFLW). The club plays its home games at Prospect Oval, located in Prospect, a northern suburb of Adelaide. North Adelaide’s history can be traced directly back to the formation of the Medindie Football Club in 1881. Medindie was elevated to the South Australian Football Association (SAFA, later to become the SANFL) in 1888 as the Medindie Football Club (nickname Dindies and from 1890s Dingoes), changing its name to North Adelaide in 1893 with the promise of support from North Adelaide residents. It is the fourth oldest club still in operation in the SANFL after South Adelaide (1877), Port Adelaide (1877) and Norwood (1878). As the Port Adelaide SANFL team merged with the Port Adelaide AFL team in 2013 and now plays in the SANFL as an AFL Reserves team, some will argue that North Adelaide is now the third oldest SANFL club still in operation in the SANFL. North Adelaide's first premiership was won in 1900 (which finally broke the dominance of the 3 older clubs), and the club has won a total of fourteen senior men's premierships in the SANFL, most recently in 2018.

== History ==
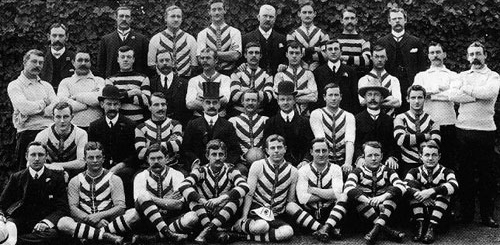
The 1905 NAFC team.

In 1880 a group of schoolboys from Prince Alfred College and the now defunct Whinham College got together and played football on a section of the Park Lands, previously known as Hawker's Paddock. It was so called locally because it was leased from the City of Adelaide by George Hawker, a well known citizen of the suburb of Medindie. The schoolboys dubbed their football team the Medindie Football Club. They wore the red and white colours of Prince Alfred College and played other football teams on the site. One of those schoolboys was Charles Nitschke who would become Captain of the Medindie Club and would be known as the founding Father of North Adelaide Football Club.

One of the club's first reported games were in May 1882 against Prince Alfred and St Peters Colleges Second Twenties both on Medindie's home ground.

Medindie was a foundation member in 1885 of the South Australian Junior Football Association, before being admitted to the Adelaide and Suburban Football Association in 1886.

At the Annual General Meeting on 16 March 1888, held at the Red Lion Hotel, the Secretary Charles Nitschke was elected a Life Member for his valuable services to the club.

At the start of 1888, during a split of the SAFA, the Medindie Club was invited to join with 3 senior clubs, Port Adelaide, South Adelaide and the Adelaide (1885), into forming a new Senior South Australia Football Association. Once the dispute was settled the club was still invited to join the senior Association for the 1888 SAFA season.

On 14 March 1893, at a meeting held at Temperance Hall, Tynte Street, North Adelaide it was unanimously decided to renamed itself from Medindie to North Adelaide. Although several other early clubs, including Victorians and Hothams which used the name of "North Adelaide" prior to 1893, none of them bore ties to the current club.

North Adelaide started playing at Prospect Oval from 1922 with the first game of the season on Monday 8 May 1922 against Glenelg and it has remained their home ground ever since.

North Adelaide competed in the first match played at Football Park (now known as AAMI Stadium) in round 5, 1974. Their opponent was Central District. The match was won by Central District.

The longest serving coach for the club is Michael Nunan – 12 seasons from 1981 to 1992.

The Captain's record is held by Ian McKay, captaining the team for 8 years from 1948 to 1955.

The North Adelaide Football Club officially renamed both ends of Prospect Oval in 2012 after the two official Icons of the club. The northern end around the goals was named the "Ken Farmer End", while the southern end was named the "Barrie Robran End".

South Australian Football Hall of Fame and Australian Football Hall of Fame inductee Jack 'Dinny' Reedman and future North Adelaide Premiership Captain began his career at Medindie in 1884.

North Adelaide was a foundation member of the SANFL Women's competition in 2017. The Roosters lost two grand finals in the league before eventually claiming their maiden women's premiership in 2020.

== Club Icons ==
The North Adelaide Football Club has named two of their past champions as Icons. They are:

- Ken Farmer – All-time leading SANFL goal kicker with 1,419 from 1929 to 1941. Premiership player in 1930 and 1931. Premiership coach in 1949 and 1952. Since 1981 the leading goalkicker in each SANFL season has been awarded the "Ken Farmer Medal". He kicked 105 goals in 1930 to become the first SA League player to kick 100 goals in a season. He was a prolific goalkicker, kicking 100 goals in a season in 11 consecutive seasons (1930–1940). Farmer also holds the record for the most goals in an SANFL match – 23 against West Torrens at Prospect on 6 July 1940. Farmer scored ten or more goals in thirty-seven matches, and 1,419 goals in total over his career, at an astounding average of 6.3 per match.
- Barrie Robran – Triple Magarey Medallist (1968, 1970, 1973). Premiership player in 1971 and 1972, is North Adelaide's other iconic player, Barrie Robran, played 201 League games for the Roosters and 10 State games, and won 3 Magarey Medals (1968, 1970 and 1973). He was the first SANFL player to be made a "Legend" in the Australian Football Hall of Fame, and the only "Legend" not to have played VFL or AFL.

== Club song ==
North Adelaide have had many versions of their club song in the past. All versions have contained the same lyrics, but have been changed rhythm wise to keep up with the times. The lyrics and tune, by well known Australian singer/songwriter Johnny Mac, are the only completely original written in the league, as all the other clubs have written lyrics to well known tunes. The most recent version was brought in during the early 2000s, but all versions can still be found on the club song CD.

It's a great, great club,
And the club we love,
We're the good old red and whites!
The mighty Roosters we're called,
All for one, one for all,
If we're down we fight, fight, fight!
We always play as a team,
And we play it clean,
We're never out of sight,
Be it wet, be it dry,
We try, try, try,
We're the good old red and whites!

== Current playing list ==
North Adelaide Football Club
Senior list		Coaching staff
1 Harrison Wigg (VC); 2 Sam Ramsay; 3 Hughen Wissman; 4 Will Gowers; 5 Angus Schumacher; 6 Lost to AFL MidSeason Draft; 7 Jake Cresswell; 8 Kelsey Rypstra; 9 Tom Tasker; 10 Alex Spina (C); 11 Josh Gillow; 12 Dyson Hilder; 13 Cody Raak; 14 Amin Naim; 15 Reed Van Huisstede; 16 Frank Szekely; 17 Mitch Harvey; 18 Jed Dignan; 19 Blayne O’Loughlin; 20 Steve Jackson; 21 Tom Stevens; 22 Kalan Caputo; 23 James Battersby; 24 Jerome Mills-Vasas; 25 Lachie Wilsdon; 26 Lost to AFL MidSeason Draft; 27 Harrison Magor; 28 Luke Lawrence; 29 Charlie Haysman; 30 Tadhg Evans; 31 Max Blacker; 32 Blake Oudshoorn-Bennier	33 Hugh Payze; 34 Bryce Sanders; 35 Will Francou; 36 Charlie Dickerson; 37 Alex Hollingworth; 38 James Van Wyk; 39 Angus Tully; 40 Taj Murray; 41 Luke Harvey; 42 Ben Francou; 43 Liam Grubb; 44 Owen Kalic; 45 Max Kozlik; 46 Fergus Lamp-Brooks; 47 Kobe Banks; 48 Luigi Mondello; 49 Lachlan Crabb; 50 Ryan Paul; 51 Antonio Mondello; 52 Henry Turner; 53 Jay Saunders; 54 Hunter Press; 55 Steve Jackson; 56 Luke Hadad; 57 Lachlan Gardner; 58 Mitchell Crosby; 59 Jarman Sigal; 60 Elijah Welsh; 61 Matthew Reed; 62 Finn Hayden; 63; 64; 65 vacant	Head coach: Josh Francou; Legend: (c) Captain(s); (vc) Vice-captain(s); Updated: 19 October 2024; Source(s): Players,

== Club achievements ==
Premierships
Competition	Level	Wins	Years Won
South Australian National Football League	Men's Seniors	14	1900, 1902, 1905, 1920, 1930, 1931, 1949, 1952, 1960, 1971, 1972, 1987, 1991, 2018
South Australian National Football League	Women's Seniors	2	2020, 2022
South Australian National Football League	Men's Reserves	12	1912, 1925, 1928, 1932, 1934, 1964, 1965, 1966, 2005, 2006, 2016, 2018
South Australian National Football League	Women's Reserves (Note: The second-tier of women's competition is officially referred to as the "Development League".)	1	2022 (Note: No grand final was held though official league documents regard North Adelaide as the premiers of the 2022 Women's Development League.)
South Australian National Football League	Under 19s (1937–2008)	8	1937, 1942, 1948, 1949, 1954, 1961, 1966, 2005
South Australian National Football League	Under 17s (1939–2008)	12	1939, 1940, 1947, 1950, 1952, 1956, 1969, 1970, 1987, 1997, 2005, 2007
South Australian National Football League	Under 16s (2010–present)	3	2010, 2011, 2013
Other titles and honours
Championship of Australia	Men's Seniors	1	1972
Stanley H Lewis Trophy	Multiple	7	1966, 1967, 1971, 1972, 2005, 2006, 2014, 2022
SANFL Night Series	Men's Seniors	1	1968
Finishing positions
South Australian National Football League	Minor premiership (men's seniors)	16	1900, 1905, 1920, 1930, 1932, 1949, 1952, 1958, 1967, 1971, 1972, 1985, 1986, 1987, 1989, 2022
South Australian National Football League	Grand Finalists (men's seniors)	18	1906, 1913, 1914, 1919, 1923, 1926, 1927, 1932, 1951, 1963, 1973, 1985, 1986, 1989, 2007, 2013, 2020, 2022
South Australian National Football League	Wooden spoons (men's seniors)	10	1888, (Note: Club was known as the "Medindie Football Club" at this time.) 1889, 1894, 1899, 1912, 1978, 1999, 2003, 2015, 2017
South Australian National Football League	Minor premiership (women's seniors)	3	2017, 2020, 2022
South Australian National Football League	Grand Finalists (women's seniors)	2	2017, 2019
South Australian National Football League	Wooden spoons (women's seniors)	1	2024

== Club records ==
- Home Ground: Prospect Oval (1922–present)
- Previous Home Grounds: Kensington Oval (1888–94), Adelaide Oval (1895–98, 1902–03, 1905–21), Jubilee Oval (1899–1901, 1904)
- Record Attendance at Prospect Oval: 19,120 v Port Adelaide in Round 5, 1958
- Record Attendance: 56,525 v Glenelg at Adelaide Oval, 1973 SANFL Grand Final
- Record Attendance at AAMI Stadium: 50,617 v Glenelg, 1987 SANFL Grand Final
- Record Attendance since Adelaide Crows (AFL) formation (1991): 40,355 v Norwood at Adelaide Oval, 2018 SANFL Grand Final
- Record Attendance since Port Adelaide (AFL) entry (1997): 40,355 v Norwood at Adelaide Oval, 2018 SANFL Grand Final
- Most Games: 378 by Michael Redden (1978–93) plus 11 state games
- Most Goals in a Season: 134 by Ken Farmer in 1936
- Most Goals for the club: 1419 by Ken Farmer (1929–41, 224 games)
- First player to kick 100 goals in an SANFL season: Ken Farmer (1930 – 105 goals)
- Most Years as Coach: 12 by Michael Nunan (1981–92)
- Most Premierships as Coach: 2 by P. Lewis (1930, 1931), Ken Farmer (1949, 1952), Mike Patterson (1971, 1972) and Michael Nunan (1987, 1991)
- Most Years as Captain: 8 by Ian McKay (1948–55)
- Most Premierships as Captain: 2 by John Reedman (1902, 1905), Percy Furler (1930, 1931), Ian McKay (1949, 1952) and Mike Patterson (1971, 1972)
- Most Best & Fairest Awards: 7 by Barrie Robran (1967–73)
- Highest Score: 34.22 (226) v South Adelaide 6.12 (48) at Adelaide Oval in Round 5, 1972

== Premiership sides ==
=== 2018 Premiership Side ===
North Adelaide 19.10 (124) defeated Norwood 15.15 (105)
Venue: Adelaide Oval
Attendance: 40,355
Date: 23 September 2018
Umpires: Bowen, Medlin, Harris
Jack Oatey Medallist: Mitch Grigg (Norwood)

2018 Premiership Team
B:	Callum Wilkie (26)	Cameron Craig (5)	Mitch Clisby (10)
HB:	Brock Castree (23)	Tanner Smith (7)	Connor Rozee (48)
C:	Maris Olekalns (14)	Aidan Tropiano (1)	Jarred Allmond (11)
HF:	Lewis Hender (19)	Keenan Ramsey (3)	Boyd Woodcock (27)
F:	Mitch Harvey (17)	Alex Barns (4)	Robbie Young (8)
Foll:	Jordon Sweet (40)	Tom Schwarz (15)	Max Thring (c) (30)
Int:	Sam McInerney (39)	Mackenzie Slee (53)	Jake Wohling (20)
Coach:	Josh Carr		

Best: Schwarz Allmond Barns Tropiano Woodcock Castree
Goals:
4 – Barns
3 – Harvey, Woodcock, McInerney
2 – Hender
1 – Ramsey, Sweet, Wilkie, Young

=== 1991 Premiership Side ===
North Adelaide 21.22 (148) defeated West Adelaide 11.7 (73)
Venue: Football Park
Attendance: 39,276
Date: 5 October 1991
Umpires: Laurie Argent and Mick Abbott
Jack Oatey Medallist: Darel Hart

1991 Premiership Team
B:	Rod Saunders (4)	Sean Tasker (21)	Bradley Ryan (24)
HB:	Steven Barratt (18)	Trevor Clisby (29)	Tim Perkins (15)
C:	David Sanders (9)	Peter Krieg (17)	Marc Marshall (19)
HF:	Brodie Atkinson (47)	Peter Bennett (35)	Steven Hamilton (25)
F:	Craig Burton (5)	Michael Parsons (28)	Darel Hart (3)
Foll:	Michael Redden (42)	Kym Klomp (c) (7)	Steven Sims (2)
Int:	Stephen Riley (22)	Tim Nunan (38)	
Coach:	Michael Nunan		

Best: Hart, Perkins, Sanders, Krieg, Redden, Parsons, Sims
Goals:
7 – Hart
4 – Burton
2 – Hamilton, Parsons
1 – Atkinson, Clisby, Krieg, Nunan, Perkins, Sanders

=== 1987 Premiership Side ===
North Adelaide 23.7 (145) defeated Glenelg 9.9 (63)
Venue: Football Park
Attendance: 50,617
Date: 3 October 1987
Umpires: Neville Thorpe, Rick Kinnear
Jack Oatey Medallist: Michael Parsons

1987 Premiership Team
B:	Peter Simmons (31)	Paul Arnold (32)	Stephen Riley (22)
HB:	John Riley (1)	Trevor Clisby (29)	David Tiller (4)
C:	Roger Carlaw (11)	Kym Klomp (7)	David Sanders (9)
HF:	Darren Jarman (8)	Peter Bennett (35)	Craig Burton (5)
F:	Michael Parsons (28)	John Roberts (25)	Steven Sims (2)
Foll:	Michael Redden (42)	Andrew Jarman (17)	Darel Hart (c) (3)
Int:	Michael Armfield (16)	Wayne Slattery (34)	
Coach:	Michael Nunan		

Best:
Goals:
6 – Parsons
5 – Roberts
4 – Sims
3 – Burton, D. Jarman
2 – A. Jarman

=== 1972 Premiership Side ===
North Adelaide 19.14 (128) defeated Port Adelaide 10.12 (72)
Venue: Adelaide Oval
Attendance: 55,709
Date: 30 September 1972
Umpires:

1972 Premiership Team
B:	Geoff Paull (6)	Bob Hammond (29)	John Spry (38)
HB:	Geoff Strang (3)	Bohdan Jaworskyj (27)	Allan Howard (15)
C:	John Phillips (7)	Barrie Robran (10)	Barry Stringer (9)
HF:	Darryl Webb (19)	Rodney Robran (20)	Adrian Rebbeck (18)
F:	Barry Hearl (14)	Dennis Sachse (30)	David Marsh (36)
Foll:	Garry Sporn (26)	John Plummer (13)	Terry von Bertouch (2)
Int:	Rick Schubert (37)	Kevin Barr (17)	
Coach:	Mike Patterson		

Best:
Goals:
6 – Sachse
3 – Hearl
2 – Marsh, R. Robran, von Bertouch
1 – Phillips, Plummer, Rebbeck, B. Robran, Webb

=== 1971 Premiership Side ===
North Adelaide 10.19 (79) defeated Port Adelaide 9.5 (59)
Venue: Adelaide Oval
Attendance: 52,228
Date: 25 September 1971
Umpires:

1971 Premiership Team
B:	Geoff Paull (6)	Bob Hammond (29)	Peter Anderson (3)
HB:	David Burns (28)	Bohdan Jaworskyj (27)	Allan Howard (15)
C:	John Phillips (7)	Kym Lehmann (11)	Barry Stringer (9)
HF:	Terry Collins (17)	Barrie Robran (10)	Adrian Rebbeck (18)
F:	Mike Patterson (c) (25)	Neil Sachse (12)	Ken Francou (21)
Foll:	Garry Sporn (26)	Darryl Webb (19)	Terry von Bertouch (2)
Int:	Arch Wilkey (23)	Barry Hearl (14)	
Coach:	Mike Patterson		

Best:
Goals:
4 – Rebbeck
3 – Webb
2 – Sachse
1 – Collins

=== 1960 Premiership Side ===
North Adelaide 14.11 (95) defeated Norwood 13.12 (90)
Venue: Adelaide Oval
Attendance: 54,162
Date: 1 October 1960
Umpire:

1960 Premiership Team
B:	Don Gilbourne (c) (1)	Bob Hammond (18)	Theodore "Hank" Lindner (3)
HB:	Brian Gambling (7)	Malcolm Montgomery (4)	Ray Carroll (20)
C:	Ron Hewett (6)	Ray Trenorden (21)	Barrie Barbary (5)
HF:	Malcolm Whitford (10)	Don Lindner (2)	Terry Hughes (16)
F:	Alwin Faggotter (12)	Bob Pascoe (15)	Barry Potts (8)
Foll:	John Bubner (9)	Barry Kent (11)	Billy Thomas (14)
Int:	Alan Cheek (19)	Peter Bottroff (17)	
Coach:	Jack McCarthy		

Best: Potts, Gilbourne, Hammond, Gambling
Goals:
7 – Potts
1 – Barbary, Hughes, Kent, D. Lindner, Thomas, Trenorden, Whitford

=== 1952 Premiership Side ===
North Adelaide 23.15 (153) defeated Norwood 6.9 (45)
Venue: Adelaide Oval
Attendance: 50,105
Date: 4 October 1952
Umpire:

1952 Premiership Team
B:	Lloyd Weston (14)	Ian McKay (c) (1)	John Tidswell (15)
HB:	Les Cunningham (22)	Alan Galloway (4)	John Blunden (5)
C:	Merv Way (20)	Lyle Griffin (9)	John Renner (21)
HF:	Don Gilbourne (16)	Geoff Fuller (17)	Paul Kennett (12)
F:	Ron Phillips (2)	Bob Proud (7)	Hubert McKenzie (18)
Foll:	Alan Aldenhoven (3)	Dean Stringer (6)	Darcy Cox (23)
Int:	Keith Carroll (8)	Allen Odgers (10)	
Coach:	Ken Farmer		

Best:
Goals:
4 – Kennett, McKenzie, Phillips
3 – Cox
2 – Proud
1 – Aldenhoven, Gilbourne, Griffin, Fuller, McKay, Renner

=== 1949 Premiership Side ===
North Adelaide 13.17 (95) defeated West Torrens 9.18 (72)
Venue: Adelaide Oval
Attendance: 42,490
Date: 1 October 1949
Umpire:

1949 Premiership Team
B:	Tom MacKenzie (4)	Ian McKay (c) (1)	Frank O’Leary (2)
HB:	Alan Galloway (16)	Frank Crouch (9)	John Blunden (3)
C:	Brian Coulls (11)	Stanley Hancock (7)	Allen Odgers (5)
HF:	Jeff Pash (17)	Ron Phillips (10)	Paul Kennett (15)
F:	Keith Carroll (21)	Dean Stringer (8)	Morrie Arbon (13)
Foll:	Len Pedler (18)	Colin Aamodt (20)	Darcy Cox (14)
Int:	John Tidwell (12)	Don Gilbourne (22)	
Coach:	Ken Farmer		

Best:
Goals:
4 – Stringer
3 – Cox
2 – Peddler
1 – Arbon, Kennett, Pash, Phillips

=== 1931 Premiership Side ===
North Adelaide 17.13 (115) defeated Sturt 11.11 (77)
Venue: Adelaide Oval
Attendance: 34,202
Date: 3 October 1931
Umpire:

1931 Premiership Team
B:	Bob Barrett (12)	Harry Fleet (11)	Ray Munn (23)
HB:	Bert Mangelsdorf (8)	Stan Burton (24)	Darrell Conrad (5)
C:	Norm Drew (7)	Stan Lock (19)	Jack MacKay (3)
HF:	Robert Taylor (6)	Harold Hawke (14)	Brian Burns (8)
F:	Percy Furler (c) (1)	Ken Farmer (9)	Norman Proud (15)
Foll:	Clarrie Willshire (22)	Don Phillis (16)	Garfield Storer (10)
Int:	George Foulis (13)		
Coach:	Percy Lewis		

Best:
Goals:
6 – Farmer
4 – Proud
2 – Furler, Willshire
1 – Burns, Hawke, Lock

=== 1930 Premiership Side ===
North Adelaide 9.13 (67) defeated Port Adelaide 9.9 (63)
Venue: Adelaide Oval
Attendance: 23,609
Date: 4 October 1930
Umpire:

1930 Premiership Team
B:	George Foulis (12)	Harry Fleet (11)	Ron May (21)
HB:	Robert Taylor (6)	Bert Mangelsdorf (18)	Darrell Conrad (5)
C:	Norm Drew (7)	Stan Lock (19)	Garfield Storer (10)
HF:	Sid Burton (24)	Clarrie Willshire (22)	Harold Hawke (14)
F:	Bob Barrett (12)	Ken Farmer (9)	James McDowall (c) (1)
Foll:	Percy Furler (2)	Ray Munn (23)	William Thomas (8)
Int:	Frederick Hardwick (17)		
Coach:	Percy Lewis		

Best:
Goals:
4 – Farmer
2 – Barrett
1 – Burton, Furler, Hawke

=== 1920 Premiership Side ===
North Adelaide 9.15 (69) defeated Norwood 3.3 (21)
Venue: Adelaide Oval
Attendance: Approximately 31,000
Date: 18 September 1920
Umpire:

1920 Premiership Team
B:	Ivan Davey (3)	Richard Foale (7)	Leslie Reedman (18)
HB:	Charles Penery (17)	Jack "Snowy" Hamilton (9)	David Crawford (2)
C:	Russell Fuss (6)	Percy Lewis (12)	Alby Fooks (21)
HF:	Frank Haines (10)	Percy Frost (23)	Glyn Trescowthick (13)
F:	Lloyd Davies (14)	Dan O'Brien (19)	Laurence Sprigg (16)
Foll:	Tom Leahy (c) (1)	Cecil Curnow (20)	Vernon Maloney (4)
Coach:	Albert Klose		

Best:
Goals:
2 – Frost, Leahy
1 – Curnow, Lewis, Maloney, Sprigg, Trescowthick

=== 1905 Premiership Side ===
North Adelaide 6.8 (44) defeated Port Adelaide 1.6 (12)
Venue: Adelaide Oval
Attendance: Approximately 11,000
Date: 9 September 1905
Umpire:

1905 Premiership Team
B:	Alec Ewers	Jimmy Matthews	Charles Fotheringham
HB:	Tom MacKenzie	Fred Odlum	Herb Ward
C:	Jack Rees	Edward MacKenzie	Norman Pash
HF:	Charlie Jessop	Vern Drew	William "Peter" Fleet
F:	Ernie Johns	Anthony "Boss" Daly	Jack "Dinny" Reedman (c)
Foll:	John Earl	Frank Young	Harold "Araby" Pash
Coach:	n/a		

Best:
Goals:
4 – Jessop
1 – Fleet, Johns

=== 1902 Premiership Side ===
North Adelaide 9.14 (68) defeated South Adelaide 4.7 (31)
Venue: Adelaide Oval
Attendance: not recorded
Date: 6 September 1902
Umpire:

1902 Premiership Team
B:	William Dawkins	Alec Ewers	George Carter
HB:	Terry Bradley	Norm Clark	Norman Claxton
C:	Jack Rees	Phil Sandland	Norman Pash
HF:	Jimmy Matthews	Frederick Dickenson	Norman Lemon
F:	John Earl	Ernie Johns	Anthony "Boss" Daly
Foll:	Charles Fotheringham	Jack "Dinny" Reedman (c)	Charlie Jessop
Coach:	n/a		

Best:
Goals:
4 – Jessop
2 – Dickenson, Johns
1 – Daly

=== 1900 Premiership Side ===
North Adelaide 4.3 (27) defeated South Adelaide 1.8 (14)
Venue: Adelaide Oval
Attendance: approximately 7,000
Date: 8 September 1900
Umpire:

1900 Premiership Team
B:	William Baker	George Carter	Sam Heseltine
HB:	Norm Clark	Ernie Jones (c)	Norman Claxton
C:	Harry Wilmshurst	Ernie Mitchell	Harold "Araby" Pash
HF:	William Dawkins	Jimmy Matthews	Thomas McNamara
F:	Bill Shaw	Norman Pash	Frederick Dickenson
Foll:	Jack "Dinny" Reedman	Harry Mumme	Charles "Joe" Coates
Coach:	n/a		

Best:
Goals:
2 – McNamara
1 – Matthews, Shaw

== Team of the Century (1901–2000) ==
Selected by a committee composed of Colin Walsh (chairman), Don Lindner, Tom McKenzie, Jeff Pash, Barrie Robran and Gordon Schwartz. Each member provided a list of candidates for each position and the Committee then set about the arduous task of selecting the final team. The selected team was formally announced at a gala dinner held on 7 October 2000.

North Adelaide Team of the Century
B:	Bob Hammond	Ian McKay (c)	Don Gilbourne
HB:	John Riley	Ron Phillips	Bohdan Jaworskyj
C:	Norm Drew	Andrew Jarman	Barrie Barbary
HF:	Jeff Pash	Don Lindner (vc)	Harold Hawke
F:	Tony Antrobus	Ken Farmer	Percy Furler
Foll:	Tom Leahy	Barrie Robran	Tom MacKenzie
Int:	Michael Redden	Darren Jarman	Brenton Phillips
Coach:	Mike Patterson		

== Individual ==
=== Magarey Medallists ===
- Phil Sandland 1901
- Tom MacKenzie 1905, 1906
- Tom Leahy 1913
- Harold 'Dribbler' Hawke 1937
- Jeff Pash 1939
- H.Ron Phillips 1948, 1949
- Ian McKay 1950
- Barrie Barbary 1960
- Don Lindner 1967^
- Barrie Robran 1968, 1970, 1973
- Tony Antrobus 1983
- Andrew Jarman 1987
- Brenton Phillips 1993
- Josh Francou 1996
- James Allan 2007, 2010, 2011
- Rhys Archard 2009
- Campbell Combe 2020
- Aaron Young 2022

^ – awarded retrospectively

=== All-Australians ===
- Haydn Bunton 1956
- Don Lindner 1961
- Andrew Jarman 1986, 1987

=== League Leading Goalkickers ===
- Anthony "Bos" Daly (54) 1903, (30) 1905
- Perc Lewis (58) 1923
- Ken Farmer (105) 1930, (126) 1931, (102) 1932, (112) 1933, (106) 1934, (128) 1935, (134) 1936, (108) 1937, (112) 1938, (113) 1939, (123) 1940
- W. McKenzie (67) 1954
- Dennis Sachse (90) 1967
- John Roberts (111) 1987
- Daniel Hargraves (68) 2002
- Mitch Harvey (45) 2024
