= Jeff Pash =

Australian rules footballer (1916–2005)

Personal information
- Born: 18 August 1916
- Died: 22 April 2005 (aged 88)

Playing career^{1}
| Years | Club | Games (Goals) |
| 1938–40, 1944–49 | North Adelaide | 137 (37) |

Representative team honours
| Years | Team | Games (Goals) |
| | South Australia | 4 |
- ^{1} Playing statistics correct to the end of 1949.

Career highlights
- Magarey Medalist: 1939; South Australian Football Hall of Fame inductee

Jeff Pash (15 August 1916 – 22 April 2005) was an Australian rules footballer who played with North Adelaide in the South Australian National Football League (SANFL). He is a half forward flanker in North Adelaide's official 'Team of the Century'.

Pash made his North Adelaide debut in a game against Port Adelaide in 1938, aged 21. He was the club's best and fairest winner that year and again the following season. In 1939 he was also a Magarey Medalist, tying with Ray McArthur from West Adelaide but winning after the umpires conferred. From 1941 to 1943 he was in Port Augusta due to teaching commitments and didn't return to the club until 1944, although they had merged with Norwood Football Club. He was a premiership player that season and when the war was over the merger ended. His last game of league football was in the 1949 SANFL Grand Final against West Torrens which North Adelaide won by 23 points, thus ending a premiership drought for the club stretching back to 1931.

He finished with a total of 137 games for North Adelaide and four for South Australia at interstate football.

From 1950 to 1964 he was a respected football journalist for The Adelaide News.
