= Tony Antrobus =

Australian rules footballer

Personal information
- Full name: Anthony John Antrobus
- Nickname: The Angry Ant / The Ant
- Born: 8 April 1962 (age 64); Adelaide, South Australia
- Draft: No. 20, 1982 interstate draft
- Height: 174 cm (5 ft 9 in)
- Weight: 72 kg (159 lb)

Playing career^{1}
Years	Club	Games (Goals)
1981–1986	North Adelaide	82 (155)
1987–1990	Essendon	22 (26)
1991	St Kilda	6 (5)
1992	North Adelaide	0 (0)
- ^{1} Playing statistics correct to the end of 1992.

Career highlights
- Magarey Medal: 1983; North Adelaide Team of the Century 1901–2000: selected in forward pocket

Anthony John Antrobus (born 8 April 1962) is a former Australian rules footballer who played for the North Adelaide Roosters in the South Australian National Football League (SANFL) and had stints with Essendon and St Kilda in the Victorian Football League (VFL). He was commonly referred to by his nickname of "The Ant". Although only weighing 72 kg and being 174 cm tall, Antrobus was a very aggressive player who never took a backward step. Tony Antrobus was the winner of the 1983 Magarey Medal while playing for North Adelaide.

== Career ==
As a forward with considerable speed and goal sense, Antrobus first played for North Adelaide in 1981 and scored one Magarey Medal vote from his three games (contrary to other articles, which stated that he was awarded three votes in each of those three games). He won the award in 1983, becoming the tenth North Adelaide player to achieve the most sought after individual award in the SANFL. The talent scouts from Victoria persisted in pursuing one of the most sought after players in the SANFL. He eventually was lured to the VFL in 1987 to join Essendon but niggling injuries kept his appearances limited, playing 22 games over four seasons. St Kilda picked him up in 1991 but the following year he decided to return to his home state for one last season with the Roosters, where he played four Foundation Cup pre-season games before retiring.

Antrobus was named in the forward pocket in the official North Adelaide 'Team of the Century'.

On 24 October 2000, Antrobus was awarded the Australian Sports Medal for being a "recipient of the highest individual honour in South Australian Football".
