= John Roberts (footballer, born 1956) =

Australian rules footballer

Personal information
- Born: 23 September 1956 (age 70)
- Height: 186 cm (6 ft 1 in)
- Weight: 87 kg (13 st 10 lb)

Playing career^{1}
Years	Club	Games (Goals)
1974–1979, 1983	Woodville (SANFL)	120 (191)
1980–1982	South Melbourne/Sydney (VFL)	50 (135)
1984–1986	West Torrens (SANFL)	58 (215)
1987–1988	North Adelaide (SANFL)	53 (210)
Total		281 (751)
- ^{1} Playing statistics correct to the end of 1988.

Career highlights
- SANFL debut for Woodville in 1974; VFL for South Melbourne in 1980; All-Australian team 1980; SANFL Ken Farmer Medalist 1987; North Adelaide premiership player 1987

John Roberts (born 23 September 1956) is a former Australian rules footballer who played with South Melbourne in the Victorian Football League (VFL). He was the club's leading goal kicker in 1980 and 1981.

Roberts holds the record for the most goals kicked in a game at Football Park in Adelaide when he kicked 16 for Woodville against Central District in the 1977 SANFL season.

For 1984, Roberts switched to West Torrens, where he would top the team's goalkicking in each of his three seasons. In 1985, Roberts would kick ten goals for a losing side against Centrals, and finish the season with 83 goals. He later went on to play full forward for North Adelaide in their 1987 SANFL Grand Final win over Glenelg at Football Park. He also won the Ken Farmer Medal as the SANFL's leading goal kicker in 1987 with 111 goals.
