= Sean Tasker =

Australian rules footballer

Personal information
- Full name: Sean James Tasker
- Born: 18 June 1968 (age 58)
- Original team: North Adelaide
- Height: 188 cm (6 ft 2 in)
- Weight: 90 kg (198 lb)

Playing career^{1}
Years	Club	Games (Goals)
1991–1997	Adelaide	48 (17)
- ^{1} Playing statistics correct to the end of 1997.

Sean James Tasker (born 18 June 1968) is a former professional Australian rules footballer who played for the Adelaide Football Club in the Australian Football League (AFL).

Tasker was North Adelaide's leading goal-kicker in 1989 but played as a full-back in their 1991 premiership team.

A foundation player at Adelaide, he made his AFL debut in 1991 at the age of 23. Used mostly as a defender, he still played as a forward on occasions and kicked five goals against Sydney in 1992. He made just five appearances in 1993, but participated in two finals. Over the next three seasons he played in the seniors just 21 times and was let go by the club. He continued playing in the SANFL, with stints at both Glenelg and Sturt.

He has three sons, named Sam, Will and Tom.
