= Merv Agars =

Australian rules footballer and journalist

Personal information
- Full name: Mervyn Stanley Agars
- Born: 12 June 1925; Elliston, South Australia
- Died: 8 August 2017 (aged 92); Nuriootpa, South Australia
- Original team: Prince Alfred College
- Height: 186 cm (6 ft 1 in)
- Weight: 76 kg (168 lb)
- Position: Follower

Playing career
Years	Club	Games (Goals)
1946–1952	West Adelaide	106 (92)

Representative team honours
Years	Team	Games (Goals)
1948-1950s	South Australia	8

Career highlights
- West Adelaide premiership player: 1947; West Adelaide leading goalkicker: 1951; SA Football Hall of Fame inductee: 2002

Mervyn Stanley Agars (12 June 1925 – 8 August 2017) was an Australian rules footballer and journalist. He played with West Adelaide in the South Australian National Football League (SANFL). An eight-time state representative, Agars went on to have a significant career in sports journalism and in 2002 was inducted into the South Australian Football Hall of Fame. In 2018, Agars was posthumously inducted into the SA Media Awards Hall of Fame.

== Early life ==
Born to John and Margaret, on a sheep farm close to Elliston, South Australia, Agars grew up as one of 10 siblings, with seven brothers and two sisters. Aged 13, he began boarding at Prince Alfred College in Adelaide and studied there for three years before returning to the family farm. Towards the end of World War II, Agars served in the Air Force Reserve.

== Career ==
Agars, a follower, began playing for West Adelaide in 1946 and in his second year of senior football was a member of their 1947 premiership team. He also played cricket for East Torrens and scored a century on his A-Grade debut in 1947.

In 1948, he joined The Advertiser and worked in the printing office, while he continued to play football for West Adelaide and at representative level for South Australia. He married his wife Margaret—the sister of state cricketer Phil Ridings—in a ceremony at an Anglican church in Adelaide in 1949. Agars topped the goalkicking at West Adelaide in 1951, his penultimate season.

Retired from football, Agars transferred to the editing section of The Advertiser in 1953 and began work as a sports journalist. He later became sports editor, a position he held for close to 20 years, the longest serving in the newspaper's history.

During his journalism career, Agars covered four Summer Olympics. He is the author of the book West Adelaide Football Club, Bloods, Sweat and Tears, a history of the club which was published in 1987.

The Advertiser annually awards the Merv Agars Medal to the best player from the Australian Football League's two South Australian clubs.

== Personal life ==
One of Agars' West Adelaide teammates, Don Taylor, was his brother-in law, and a nephew, Leon Lovegrove, played in the club's 1961 premiership team.

Agars' son, Graeme, is a noted golf and tennis commentator.

== Death ==
Agars retired and resided in the Barossa Valley until his death in 2017.
