= David Tiller =

Australian rules footballer

Personal information
- Born: 30 May 1958 (age 68); Port Pirie, South Australia
- Original team: Risdon (SGFL)
- Draft: No. 18, 1981 interstate draft

Playing career^{1}
Years	Club	Games (Goals)
1977–1990	North Adelaide	290
- ^{1} Playing statistics correct to the end of 1990.

Career highlights
- Premiership player and vice-captain 1987; Captain North Adelaide Football Club 1984–1986; Best & Fairest North Adelaide Football Club 1981,1984; Awarded Life Membership North Adelaide Football Club 1986

David Tiller (born 30 May 1958) is a former Australian rules footballer in the South Australian National Football League (SANFL), playing for the North Adelaide Football Club.

Recruited from the Risdon Football Club in the Spencer Gulf Football League, Tiller made his SANFL debut in 1977. In 1984 he was appointed captain of the North Adelaide Football Club, and captained the club from 1984 to 1986.

He played in the North Adelaide premiership team of 1987, and was vice-captain of the club that year.

Tiller won the club's best and fairest award in both 1981 and 1984, and was awarded life membership at North Adelaide in 1986.

Tiller coached the North Adelaide Under-17s team to a premiership in 2005, and coached the South Adelaide Under-17s team for two years. He coached North Adelaide Under 16s from 2009 until 2016 for premierships in 2010, 2011 and 2013. In 1993 he was playing coach of the Broadview Football Club's premiership team in A1 Amateur League. He is also a long-serving physical education and geography teacher at Westminster School in Adelaide.

During his time with the Roosters, Tiller was regarded as having one of the longest kicks in the league. He was inducted into The North Adelaide Football Club Hall Of Fame on 11 November 2017.
