= John Riley (physicist) =

- Born: 23 April 1958 (age 68)
- Occupations: Scientist and footballer
- Spouse: Dianne
- Children: Alexandra, Katherine and Andrew
- Scientific career
- Education: Flinders University PhD
- Known for: sonar
- Awards: Aeronautical and Maritime Research Laboratory Best Research Award (1996)
- Fields: atomic physics, sonar, signal processing
- Workplaces: Defence Science and Technology Organisation
- Thesis: Coherence in inelastic electron scattering from sodium (1985)
Australian rules football career
Personal information
- Original team: Broadview
- Height: 178 cm (5 ft 10 in)
- Weight: 80 kg (176 lb)
Playing career^{1}
Years	Club	Games (Goals)
1977–1990	North Adelaide	250 (31)
1984	Footscray	1 (0)
- ^{1} Playing statistics correct to the end of 1990.

John Riley (born 23 April 1958) is an Australian scientist at the Defence Science and Technology Organisation and former Australian rules footballer who played with Footscray in the Victorian Football League (VFL) and North Adelaide in the South Australian National Football League (SANFL).

== Scientist ==
Riley played football for North Adelaide Football Club while he was studying at Flinders University. He was still finishing off his PhD in atomic physics when he was recruited to the Footscray Football Club in the Victorian Football League (VFL). He returned to Adelaide after only playing one match for Footscray.

Riley completed an Australian Research Grants Scheme research fellowship, then worked in the development of instrumentation for the mining industry.

Riley moved to the Defence Science and Technology Organisation (DSTO), the research arm of the Australian Department of Defence, in 1988, initially working on sonar signal processing which improved the performance of towed array and sonobuoy systems.

Riley was awarded a Defence Science Fellowship in 1993, leading to two-year at the Defence Research Establishment Atlantic in Nova Scotia, Canada, and subsequently to the Aeronautical and Maritime Research Laboratory Best Research Award in 1996. Riley worked as the Navy Scientific Adviser in 1997, and then was appointed as head of Airborne Sonar leading a research programme in support of the RAAF P3-C Orion maritime patrol aircraft and RAN Seahawk helicopters.

Riley spent a year based in Washington, D.C. as Defence Science Attaché supporting liaison between Australia, the US and Canada. He then returned to Australia to lead submarine operations research for DSTO, based at HMAS Stirling in Western Australia. This included improvements to the Collins-class combat and sonar systems. Afterwards, he moved to Research Leader of Maritime Combat Systems, which included support for the Air Warfare Destroyer project. He has also chaired the Maritime Systems Group of The Technical Cooperation Program (TTCP).

As of 2015, Riley was back in Adelaide, as Chief of the Weapons and Combat Systems Division of DSTO. He retired in 2022.

== Football ==
Originally from Broadview, Riley made his SANFL debut in 1977 and by 1982 was North Adelaide captain. In 1982, he also won the club's 'fairest and most brilliant' award and took part in South Australia's interstate fixtures.

He was lured to the VFL in 1984 when Footscray signed him and made his first appearance in the opening round of the 1984 VFL season, with eight disposals in a win over Richmond. However, he had not been granted a clearance by North Adelaide, and the club was successful in getting a Supreme Court injunction to prevent him playing more games at Footscray.

Riley finished the season with North Adelaide and remained with the club until 1990, amassing 250 games. After playing in their 1985 and 1986 Grand Final losses, Riley was on the half back flank when they won the 1987 premiership decider. He was later named at the same position in the North Adelaide 'Team of the Century'.
