= Harold Hawke =

Australian rules footballer

Personal information
- Full name: Harold James Hawke
- Born: 26 August 1909; Adelaide, South Australia
- Died: 16 June 1995 (aged 85)

Playing career^{1}
Years	Club	Games (Goals)
1927–1939	North Adelaide	70 (103)
- ^{1} Playing statistics correct to the end of 1939.

Career highlights
- Magarey Medal (1937)

Harold James "Dribbler" Hawke (26 August 1909 – 16 June 1995) was an Australian rules footballer who played with North Adelaide in the South Australian National Football League (SANFL).

Hawke was a centre half forward and first played with North Adelaide in the 1927 season. The next year he moved to a farm on the Yorke Peninsula to work and over the coming years only played for North Adelaide on occasions, such as playing finals football in 1930 and 1931.

Hawke played a full season in 1937, winning the Magarey Medal for the best and fairest player in the SANFL. Despite playing in eleven different seasons, he finished his SANFL career with just 70 games, as well as representing South Australia at two interstate carnivals.

Hawke was named a half forward flanker in North Adelaide's official Team of the Century.

Hawke later served in the 13th Field Regiment of the Australian Army during World War II.
