= Brenton Phillips =

Australian rules footballer and coach

Personal information
- Born: 5 November 1962 (age 63)
- Original team: North Adelaide (SANFL)
- Draft: No. 8, 1982 interstate draft
- Height: 180 cm (5 ft 11 in)
- Weight: 83 kg (183 lb)

Playing career^{1}
Years	Club	Games (Goals)
1986	Essendon	10 (3)
1987–1991	Brisbane Bears	61 (30)
Total		71 (33)
- ^{1} Playing statistics correct to the end of 1991.

Career highlights
- Brisbane Bears reserves premiership 1991

Brenton Phillips (born 5 November 1962) is a former Australian rules footballer who played mainly for the Brisbane Bears in the VFL/AFL and North Adelaide in the SANFL.

Phillips spent most of his time on the field playing as wing, half forward or ruck-rover. He first played with North Adelaide in 1981 and remained with them until after the 1985 season when he joined Essendon. The Bombers were coming off successive premierships and Phillips got just 10 games in 1986 due to the strength of the side. The following year he joined the Brisbane Bears for their inaugural season in the VFL and spent five seasons at the club.

In 1992 Phillips returned to South Australia and in 1993 won the Magarey Medal. He won his first North Adelaide "best and fairest" award in 1993 and retained it in 1994. By the time he retired in 1998, he had played 222 games for North Adelaide. He was later named on the interchange bench in the club's official 'Team of the Century'.

He became coach of Sturt in 2002 and led them to the premiership in his debut season in charge, ending a 26-year drought for the club.

In 2016 was an inductee into the South Australian Football Hall of Fame
