= Don Lindner =

Australian rules footballer and coach

Donald Lindner

Personal information
- Born: 16 February 1935
- Died: 31 December 2008 (aged 73)

Playing career^{1}
Years	Club	Games (Goals)
1954–1970	North Adelaide	280 (267)

Representative team honours
Years	Team	Games (Goals)
	South Australia	16 (13)

Coaching career
Years	Club	Games (W–L–D)
1963–1966	North Adelaide	
- ^{1} Playing statistics correct to the end of 1970.

Career highlights
- North Adelaide leading goalkicker: 1955; North Adelaide best and fairest: 1958, 1962, 1967; All-Australian team: 1961; North Adelaide captain 1963–1969; Magarey Medalist: 1967; South Australian Football Hall of Fame inductee

Donald Lindner (16 February 1935 – 31 December 2008) was an Australian rules footballer who played with North Adelaide in the South Australian National Football League (SANFL). He is the centre half-forward in North Adelaide's official Team of the Century and Hall of Fame, and in 2002 was inducted into the SANFL Hall of Fame.

Lindner was renowned for his high marking and by the time he retired in 1970 had played 280 premiership games, kicking 267 goals for North Adelaide: this games total remained a club record until it was broken by Mike Redden in Round 12 of 1991. Lindner also played nine night series matches, kicking six goals.

His greatest achievement was winning the 1967 Magarey Medal, originally losing on a countback, but was awarded it retrospectively when the league decided to give the award to those who had lost on countback in previous years. He had played that season in both defence and in the ruck and was also North Adelaide's best and fairest winner for the third time, having previously won the award in 1958 and 1962.

Other honours during his career include topping North Adelaide's goal kicking in 1955 with 36 goals, being a member of their 1960 premiership side, and representing South Australia 16 times at interstate football, for a total of 305 senior career games. His best performance in South Australian colours came in the 1961 Brisbane Carnival where he was selected in the All-Australian side. He polled Tassie Medal votes in both matches he played in the Carnival, and also played a pivotal role in South Australia's famous win against Victoria in 1963, having come off the Reserves bench early in the game to score three goals, also setting up Lindsay Head for the winning goal.

He captained and coached North Adelaide from 1963 to 1966, leading them to the Grand Final in his first year in charge. In 1967 he relinquished the coaching role to Geof Motley, but remained captain until 1969.

Don Lindner died celebrating New Year's Eve 2008 at the Hampstead Hotel in Collinswood.

He is a member of the SANFL Hall of Fame, but like his first captain, Ian McKay, he is not a member of the Australian Football Hall of Fame.

== Don Lindner Walk ==
The Council of the City of Prospect commemorated Lindner's achievements by naming a short pedestrian walkway beside Prospect Oval after him. The walkway connects his former family home in Kintore Avenue with his football home in Menzies Crescent. On 29 August 2010, Mayor David O’Loughlin formally opened the Don Lindner Walk at an unveiling of a plaque at the Council Room within the North Adelaide Football Club, attended by over seventy guests and Lindner's family. The plaque has been placed on short bollards at each end of the walkway.

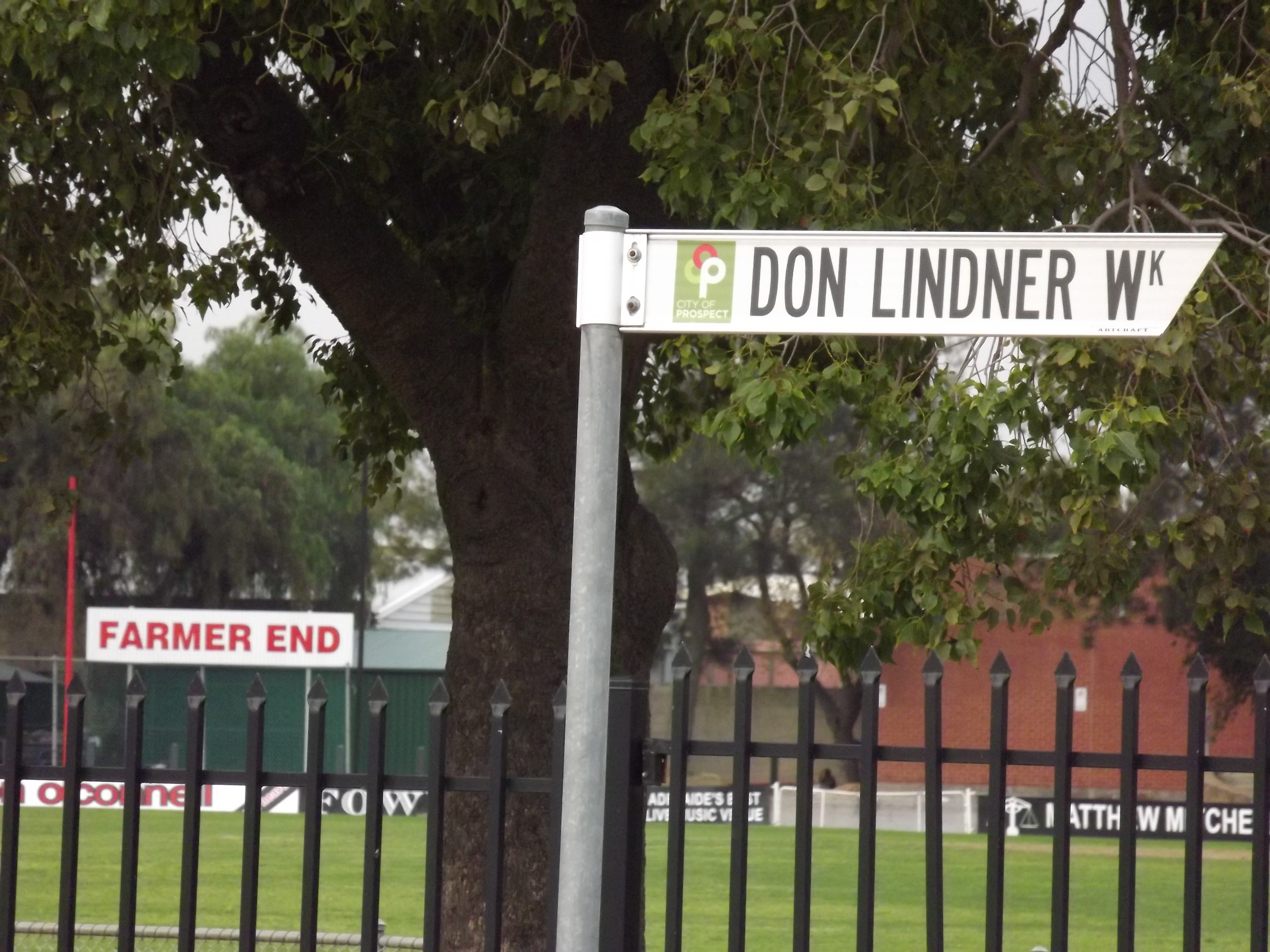
Signpost outside Prospect Oval, looking north east to the opposite end of the oval
