= Darel Hart =

Australian rules footballer

Personal information
- Full name: Darel Hart
- Born: 3 January 1964 (age 62)
- Original team: Salisbury West Football Club
- Height: 178 cm (5 ft 10 in)
- Weight: 80 kg (176 lb)

Playing career^{1}
Years	Club	Games (Goals)
1980–83	Central District	47
1984–94	North Adelaide	189
1991–92	Adelaide	39 (38)
- ^{1} Playing statistics correct to the end of 1994.

Darel Hart (born 3 January 1964) is a former Australian rules footballer who played in the South Australian National Football League (SANFL) and for the Adelaide Football Club in the Australian Football League (AFL).

From Salisbury North, Hart played junior football at Salisbury West Football Club and was recruited to and played with Central District while still a teenager. recruited to and played with Central District while still a teenager. He transferred to North Adelaide in 1984 and soon established himself as one of their best players, with 'Best and Fairest' wins in 1986 and 1987. Hart captained North Adelaide to the 1987 premiership, under coach Michael Nunan, the same year that he represented Australia in an International Rules series against Ireland. He was a premiership player again in 1991, with a Jack Oatey Medal winning seven-goal haul in the 1991 Grand Final.

Hart was recruited by Adelaide in 1991 for their inaugural AFL season and played 18 of a possible 24 games that year, including their opening round victory over Hawthorn. He was also a regular in the team the following season and kicked six goals at the Melbourne Cricket Ground when Adelaide convincingly best Richmond by 110 points in round 20.

He continued at North Adelaide in 1993 and 1994 as playing coach. Hart then coached the club from the sidelines in 1995 before returning for one final stint from 2001 to 2003, which ended after an 108 point belting in Round 16 to an equally struggling South Adelaide. North Adelaide claimed the wooden spoon.
