= Mick Nunan =

Australian rules footballer and coach

Personal information
- Full name: Michael Allen Nunan
- Born: 12 April 1949 (age 77)
- Original team: Port Pirie
- Height: 165 cm (5 ft 5 in)
- Weight: 63 kg (139 lb)

Playing career
Years	Club	Games (Goals)
1966–1977	Sturt	188 (259)
1971	Richmond	1 (3)
1978–1979	Norwood	36 (34)
1980–1982	North Adelaide	34 (18)
Total		259 (313)

Representative team honours
Years	Team	Games (Goals)
	South Australia	3 (?)

Coaching career
Years	Club	Games (W–L–D)
1981–1992	North Adelaide	279 (157–120–2)
1996	Fitzroy	14 (1–13–0)
Total		293 (158–133–2)

Career highlights
- 5× SANFL Premiership player: (1969, 1970, 1974, 1976, 1978); 2× SANFL Premiership coach: (1987, 1991); Sturt Football Club player life member; SANFL player life member; North Adelaide Football Club life member; South Australian Football Hall of Fame, inducted 2002

Michael Allen Nunan (born 12 April 1949) is a former Australian rules footballer who played for the Sturt Football Club, Norwood Football Club and the North Adelaide Football Club in the South Australian National Football League (SANFL), as well as for the Richmond Football Club in the Victorian Football League (VFL).

Nunan had a highly decorated playing career, winning premierships with Sturt and Norwood before becoming coach of North Adelaide and leading the club to two premierships. He was also Fitzroy Football Club's last official AFL senior coach in 1996, resigning halfway through the season as news came out that Fitzroy's AFL operations would be taken over by Brisbane Bears and that the Bears would become the Brisbane Lions.

Nunan was recognized for his achievements in South Australian football when he was among the inaugural inductees at the establishment of the South Australian Football Hall of Fame in 2002.

== SANFL career ==
Nunan played his football as a rover. He joined Sturt from Port Pirie in 1966 and during his 188 games with the Double Blues, he played in their 1969, 1970, 1974 and 1976 premiership sides. Having spent his whole playing career at Sturt under the tutelage of the legendary Jack Oatey, it was no surprise that Nunan was heavily influenced by him when he later became a coach. He played in the 1978 premiership side during the first of his two seasons at Norwood. He then coached North Adelaide to premierships in 1987 and 1991 during his twelve seasons as senior coach.

His solitary VFL senior game came while he was on National Service training in Melbourne. The previous week he had played in the Richmond reserves side while fellow Sturt footballer and conscript, Malcolm Greenslade, played in the senior side. The next week they both played in the seniors. Both then returned to the SANFL.

== Coaching career ==
=== Fitzroy Football Club senior coach ===
Nunan was appointed senior coach of Fitzroy Football Club for the 1996 season, when he replaced caretaker senior coach Alan McConnell, who replaced Bernie Quinlan, after Quinlan was sacked in the middle of the 1995 season.

Nunan was at the helm for Fitzroy's last ever AFL win, in Round 8 against Fremantle at Whitten Oval on 16 May 1996. It was an emotional day for many Fitzroy fans, and he described it as "a relief and reward for those players who had worked very hard to improve their skill levels". After Fitzroy lost to Essendon in Round 14, 1996 and just 48 hours after the Fitzroy administrator at the time negotiated a deal with Brisbane Bears whereby Brisbane would take over Fitzroy's AFL operations, Nunan announced his resignation as senior coach of Fitzroy Football Club to the staff and players, which he had planned to do if the deal with Brisbane went ahead. As he left the room, he remembered that the club doorman, Tommy Couch, had taken a liking to Nunan's jacket and had asked him if he could have it if he couldn't fulfill his commitments. So he returned and handed Couch the jacket. Nunan was then replaced by Alan McConnell, who returned to the role in his second stint as caretaker senior coach of Fitzroy Football Club in the 1996 season for Fitzroy's last eight games within the AFL. At the end of the 1996 season, the Fitzroy Football Club's AFL operations were taken over by Brisbane Bears, and Brisbane Bears then became Brisbane Lions.

== Bibliography ==
- Hogan P: The Tigers Of Old, Richmond FC, Melbourne 1996
