= Ron Phillips (Australian footballer) =

Australian rules footballer

Personal information
- Full name: Horace Ronald Phillips
- Born: 3 June 1921; Peterborough, South Australia
- Died: 11 January 2007 (aged 85)

Playing career^{1}
Years	Club	Games (Goals)
1940, 1946–1953	North Adelaide	139 (219)
- ^{1} Playing statistics correct to the end of 1953.

Horace Ronald Phillips (3 June 1921 – 11 January 2007) was an Australian rules footballer who played with North Adelaide in the SANFL. He won back to back Magarey Medals in 1948 and 1949, the only other North Adelaide player to achieve this feat is Tommy MacKenzie.

He was born on 3 June 1921 in Peterborough, South Australia to Horace Norman Phillips and Winifred Lena Phillips (née Cosgrove).

Phillips was a very versatile footballer and played in most positions during his 139-game career. His 1948 Magarey Medal win was at centre half back and he won the award the following season when playing at centre half forward. From 1949 to 1952 he topped North Adelaide's goalkicking, with his best tally of 66 goals coming in 1952. He also played interstate football for South Australia, making a total of 10 appearances.
