= Michael Redden =

Australian rules footballer

Personal information
- Full name: Michael John Redden
- Born: 17 May 1957 (age 69); Pekina, South Australia
- Original team: Orroroo (NAFA)
- Height: 196 cm (6 ft 5 in)
- Weight: 92 kg (203 lb)
- Position: Ruck

Playing career^{1}
Years	Club	Games (Goals)
1978–1993	North Adelaide	334 (141) (Note: These tallies refer to premiership matches (home-and-away and finals matches) only.)

Representative team honours
Years	Team	Games (Goals)
	South Australia	11
- ^{1} Playing statistics correct to the end of 1993.

Career highlights
- Premiership player 1987 and 1991; Best & Fairest North Adelaide 1983; Life membership of North Adelaide 1987; Captain of North Adelaide 1993; Captain of South Australia 1991; SANFL Hall Of Fame 2002

Michael John Redden (born 17 May 1957) is a former Australian rules footballer who played for the North Adelaide Football Club in the South Australian National Football League (SANFL). He is the holder of the club games record for North Adelaide with 334 premiership games, and also played 44 pre-season/night series matches, kicking 11 goals.

Recruited from the Orroroo Football Club in the Northern Areas Football Association, Redden made his SANFL debut in 1978.

He played in North Adelaide's premiership teams of 1987 and 1991, and won the club's best and fairest award in 1983, being awarded life membership at North Adelaide in 1987. In 1993, he was appointed captain of North Adelaide, and captained the club until his retirement at the end of the season.

Redden also played 11 matches in State of Origin football for South Australia, and was State Captain in 1991, being inducted into the SANFL Hall of Fame in 2002.

Redden lived on a farming property in Pekina, near Orroroo, 270 kilometres or 170 miles north of Adelaide, during his playing career. It is estimated that he travelled approximately 260,000 kilometres or 160,000 miles to and from matches during his career.

The value of Mick Redden's contribution to North Adelaide was officially recognised with his inclusion on the interchange bench in the club's Team of the Century. and Hall of Fame.
