= 2025 SANFL Women's League season =

SANFL Women's League season

2025 SANFL Women's season
- Date: 15 March – 27 July 2025
- Teams: 8
- Premiers: South Adelaide; 4th premiership
- Minor premiers: Woodville-West Torrens; 1st minor premiership
- Best and fairest: Zoe Venning; West Adelaide (24 votes)
- Leading goalkicker: Katelyn Rosenzweig; Central District (27 goals)
- Matches played: 60

The 2025 SANFL Women's League season was the ninth season of the SANFL Women's League (SANFLW), the state-level senior women's Australian rules football competition in South Australia. The season commenced on 15 March and concluded with the grand final on 27 July 2025.

The competition was contested by eight clubs, all of whom are affiliated with clubs from the men's South Australian National Football League (SANFL).

== Clubs ==
Club	Home ground	Capacity
Central District	X Convenience Oval	18,000
Glenelg	Stratarama Stadium	15,000
North Adelaide	Prospect Oval	2,000
Norwood	Coopers Stadium	10,000
South Adelaide	Magain Stadium	12,000
Sturt	Unley Oval	10,000
West Adelaide	Hisense Stadium	9,000
Woodville-West Torrens	Maughan Thiem Kia Oval	15,000

== Home-and-away season ==
- Full list of fixtures available here

=== Round 1 ===
	Round 1
Saturday, 15 March (11:00 am)	Woodville-West Torrens 8.5 (53)	def.	Sturt 2.6 (18)	Eastern Parade Reserve
Saturday, 15 March (6:30 pm)	South Adelaide 7.11 (53)	def.	Norwood 4.5 (29)	Magain Stadium
Sunday, 16 March (12:00 pm)	Central District 7.10 (52)	def.	Glenelg 3.3 (21)	X Convenience Oval
Sunday, 16 March (2:00 pm)	West Adelaide 5.7 (37)	def.	North Adelaide 4.8 (32)	Hisense Stadium

=== Round 2 ===
	Round 2
Saturday, 22 March (12:30 pm)	Central District 6.7 (43)	def.	Sturt 6.3 (39)	X Convenience Oval
Saturday, 22 March (12:30 pm)	Norwood 2.3 (15)	def. by	West Adelaide 5.12 (42)	Coopers Stadium
Saturday, 22 March (1:30 pm)	Woodville-West Torrens 7.9 (51)	def.	Glenelg 6.3 (39)	Eastern Parade Reserve
Sunday, 23 March (12:30 pm)	South Adelaide 1.7 (13)	def. by	North Adelaide 3.4 (22)	Magain Stadium

=== Round 3 ===
	Round 3
Saturday, 29 March (12:30 pm)	Woodville-West Torrens 12.9 (81)	def.	Central District 3.9 (27)	Eastern Parade Reserve
Saturday, 29 March (6:00 pm)	Sturt 4.8 (32)	def.	Glenelg 0.6 (6)	Summit Sport and Recreation Park
Sunday, 30 March (12:00 pm)	West Adelaide 2.4 (16)	def. by	South Adelaide 4.6 (30)	Hisense Stadium
Sunday, 30 March (2:20 pm)	Norwood 3.5 (23)	def.	North Adelaide 3.1 (19)	Hisense Stadium

=== Round 4 ===
	Round 4
Saturday, 5 April (11:50 am)	Woodville-West Torrens 7.7 (49)	def.	Norwood 1.5 (11)	Maughan Thiem Kia Oval
Saturday, 5 April (12:30 pm)	North Adelaide 7.10 (52)	def.	Glenelg 3.4 (22)	Prospect Oval
Sunday, 6 April (11:50 am)	Sturt 3.4 (22)	def.	West Adelaide 2.6 (18)	Thomas Farms Oval
Sunday, 6 April (2:00 pm)	South Adelaide 6.12 (48)	def.	Central District 7.5 (47)	Magain Stadium

=== Round 5 ===
	Round 5 (Easter Weekend)
Friday, 18 April (10:00 am)	North Adelaide 8.9 (57)	def.	Central District 3.4 (22)	Prospect Oval
Friday, 18 April (11:20 am)	Glenelg 4.7 (31)	def. by	South Adelaide 7.5 (47)	Stratarama Stadium
Friday, 18 April (11:50 am)	West Adelaide 3.4 (22)	def. by	Woodville-West Torrens 6.4 (40)	Hisense Stadium
Friday, 18 April (2:10 pm)	Sturt 7.3 (45)	def.	Norwood 6.6 (42)	Thomas Farms Oval

=== Round 6 ===
	Round 6 (ANZAC Round)
Friday, 25 April (5:00 pm)	Glenelg 1.2 (8)	def. by	Norwood 2.7 (19)	Stratarama Stadium
Saturday, 26 April (2:50 pm)	West Adelaide 4.10 (34)	def. by	Central District 7.4 (46)	Hisense Stadium
Saturday, 26 April (2:50 pm)	Woodville-West Torrens 9.6 (60)	def.	North Adelaide 3.1 (19)	Maughan Thiem Kia Oval
Sunday, 27 April (9:20 am)	Sturt 3.3 (21)	def. by	South Adelaide 8.14 (62)	Thomas Farms Oval

=== Round 7 ===
	Round 7
Saturday, 10 May (9:40 am)	West Adelaide 4.3 (27);	def.	Sturt 5.4 (34)	Hisense Stadium
Saturday, 10 May (12:00 pm)	Central District 3.7 (25)	def. by	South Adelaide 7.1 (43)	X Convenience Oval
Sunday, 11 May (9:40 am)	North Adelaide 8.3 (51)	def.	Norwood 4.6 (30)	Prospect Oval
Sunday, 11 May (12:10 pm)	Glenelg 5.5 (35)	def. by	Woodville-West Torrens 14.6 (90)	Stratarama Stadium

=== Round 8 ===
	Round 8
Saturday, 17 May (11:00 am)	Glenelg 7.7 (49)	def.	Central District 6.10 (46)	Stratarama Stadium
Saturday, 17 May (11:00 am)	Norwood 0.7 (7)	def. by	Woodville-West Torrens 8.9 (57)	Coopers Stadium
Saturday, 17 May (11:00 am)	North Adelaide 5.4 (34)	def.	West Adelaide 0.4 (4)	Prospect Oval
Sunday, 18 May (1:00 pm)	South Adelaide 9.9 (63)	def.	Sturt 3.2 (20)	Strathalbyn Oval

=== Round 9 ===
	Round 9 (First Nations Round Week 1)
Saturday, 24 May (11:50 am)	Norwood 9.4 (58)	def.	Central District 8.2 (50)	Coopers Stadium
Saturday, 24 May (12:00 pm)	Sturt 0.7 (7)	def. by	North Adelaide 5.7 (37)	Thomas Farms Oval
Saturday, 24 May (12:10 am)	Woodville-West Torrens 4.5 (29)	def. by	South Adelaide 5.3 (33)	Maughan Thiem Kia Oval
Saturday, 24 May (4:55 pm)	Glenelg 1.4 (10)	def. by	West Adelaide 4.9 (33)	Stratarama Stadium

=== Round 10 ===
	Round 10 (First Nations Round Week 2)
Saturday, 31 May (11:00 am)	West Adelaide 5.4 (34)	def.	Norwood 5.3 (33)	Hisense Stadium
Saturday, 31 May (12:10 pm)	North Adelaide 4.5 (29)	def. by	Woodville-West Torrens 5.5 (35)	Prospect Oval
Saturday, 31 May (12:10 am)	South Adelaide 8.5 (53)	def.	Glenelg 4.6 (30)	Magain Stadium
Saturday, 31 May (2:50 pm)	Sturt 6.12 (48)	def.	Central District 6.8 (44)	Thomas Farms Oval

=== Round 11 ===
	Round 11 (King's Birthday Weekend)
Saturday, 7 June (12:00 pm)	Central District 1.5 (11)	def. by	Woodville-West Torrens 6.8 (44)	X Convenience Oval
Saturday, 7 June (12:00 pm)	South Adelaide 2.4 (16)	def. by	West Adelaide 0.2 (2)	Magain Stadium
Sunday, 8 June (5:00 pm)	Glenelg 1.3 (9)	def. by	North Adelaide 3.4 (22)	Stratarama Stadium
Monday, 9 June (12:10 pm)	Sturt 0.1 (1)	def. by	Norwood 5.5 (35)	Thomas Farms Oval

=== Round 12 ===
	Round 12
Saturday, 21 June (12:00 pm)	Central District 8.3 (51)	def.	North Adelaide 3.4 (22)	X Convenience Oval
Saturday, 21 June (12:00 pm)	Woodville-West Torrens 6.5 (41)	def.	West Adelaide 3.3 (21)	Maughan Thiem Kia Oval
Sunday, 22 June (11:50 am)	Glenelg 4.9 (33)	def.	Sturt 4.4 (28)	Stratarama Stadium
Sunday, 22 June (12:10 pm)	Norwood 3.6 (24)	def. by	South Adelaide 5.9 (39)	Coopers Stadium

=== Round 13 ===
	Round 13
Saturday, 28 June (9:20 am)	Norwood 4.6 (30)	def. by	Glenelg 7.4 (46)	Coopers Stadium
Saturday, 28 June (9:50 am)	Central District 5.3 (33)	def.	West Adelaide 3.9 (27)	X Convenience Oval
Saturday, 28 June (9:50 am)	Sturt 3.2 (20)	def.	Woodville-West Torrens 1.8 (14)	Thomas Farms Oval
Saturday, 28 June (11:30 am)	North Adelaide 1.3 (9)	def. by	South Adelaide 2.3 (15)	Prospect Oval

=== Round 14 ===
	Round 14
Saturday, 5 July (9:50 am)	South Adelaide 5.7 (37)	def. by	Woodville-West Torrens 7.3 (45)	Coopers Stadium
Saturday, 5 July (12:00 pm)	Central District 10.11 (71)	def.	Norwood 7.4 (46)	X Convenience Oval
Saturday, 5 July (2:50 pm)	North Adelaide 1.2 (8)	def. by	Sturt 6.7 (43)	Thomas Farms Oval
Saturday, 5 July (4:00 pm)	West Adelaide 4.9 (33)	def.	Glenelg 2.3 (15)	Prospect Oval

== Ladder ==
Pos	Team	Pld	W	L	D	PF	PA	PP	Pts	Qualification
1	Woodville-West Torrens	14	12	2	0	689	329	67.68	24	Finals series
2	South Adelaide (P)	14	12	2	0	552	350	61.20	24	Finals series
3	North Adelaide	14	7	7	0	413	371	52.68	14	Finals series
4	Sturt	14	7	7	0	378	485	43.80	14	Finals series
5	Central District	14	6	8	0	568	617	47.93	12	
6	West Adelaide	14	5	9	0	350	401	46.60	10	
7	Norwood	14	4	10	0	402	565	41.57	8	
8	Glenelg	14	3	11	0	354	588	37.58	6	

Source: Australian Football
Rules for classification: 1) points; 2) percentage; 3) number of points for.
(P) Premiers

== Finals series ==
=== Semi-finals ===
	First Semi Final
Sunday, 13 July (2:00pm)	North Adelaide 1.2 (8)	def. by	Sturt 5.2 (32)	Maughan Thiem Kia Oval

	Second Semi Final
Sunday, 13 July (12:00pm)	Woodville-West Torrens 4.6 (30)	def.	South Adelaide 4.5 (29)	Maughan Thiem Kia Oval
Woodville-West Torrens's win by one point was the first time in competition history a final had been decided by one point.

=== Preliminary final ===
	Preliminary Final
Sunday, 20 July (12:00pm)	South Adelaide 7.6 (48)	def.	Sturt 0.3 (3)	Magain Stadium
Sturt's score is the lowest in SANFL Women's League finals history.

=== Grand Final ===
2025 SANFLW Grand Final
Sunday, 27 July (2:15 pm)	Woodville-West Torrens	def. by	South Adelaide	Stratarama Stadium (crowd: 2,831)	Report
0.2 (2); 0.4 (4); 1.6 (12); 2.6 (28)	Q1; Q2; Q3; Final	2.1 (13); 4.2 (26); 5.4 (34); 6.5 (41)	Umpires: P. Orr, J. Abbott, R. Williams; Best on ground: Emma Charlton (South Adelaide); Television broadcast: Seven Network
A. Blanden, R. Lynch	Goals	E. Brockhurst, L. Northcutt, H. Taylor, L. Clifton, L. Cockatoo-Motlop, L. Vizgaudis
C. Leuzzi, Z. Niemann, L. Moore, A. Falkenberg	Best	E. Charlton, T. King, S. Moon, L. Clifton, C. Couch, E. Schirmer, L. Vizgaudis, M. Tape

== Awards ==
- SANFL Women's Best and Fairest

Zoe Venning – 24 votes (West Adelaide)

- Coaches Award

Christina Leuzzi – 74 votes (Woodville-West Torrens)

- Leading Goal Kicker Award

Katelyn Rosenzweig – 27 goals (Central District)

- Leadership Award

Jess Bates (Glenelg)

- Breakthrough Player

Imogen Trengrove (Woodville-West Torrens)

- Development League Premiers

Glenelg

2025 SANFL Women's Team of the Year
B:	Jaslynne Smith (South Adelaide)	Jamie Parish (North Adelaide)	
HB:	Laela Ebert (North Adelaide)	Tiffany King (South Adelaide)	Maia Freemantle (Woodville-West Torrens)
C:	Zoe Venning (West Adelaide)	Christina Leuzzi (c) (Woodville-West Torrens)	Monique Bessen (Sturt)
HF:	Imogen Trengove (Woodville-West Torrens)	Kaitlyn Rosenzweig (Central District)	Jade Halfpenny (Norwood)
F:	Lucy Waye (Woodville-West Torrens)	Klaudia O'Neill (Woodville-West Torrens)	
Foll:	Soriah Moon (South Adelaide)	Jess Bates (vc) (Glenelg)	Isobel Kuiper (Sturt)
Int:	Taya Maxwell (South Adelaide)	Emma Charlton (South Adelaide)	Hannah Button (West Adelaide)
Int:	Kiana Lee (Norwood)	Lucy Moore (Woodville-West Torrens)	
Coach:	Narelle Smith (Woodville-West Torrens)		

== Representative matches ==
Two representative fixtures were organised for SANFLW-listed players. A match against the VFL Women's during the 2025 AFL's Gather Round was played for the first time since the formation of both competitions in 2016 and 2017 respectively. This was followed by a contest against the WAFL Women's the following month.

=== SANFLW vs VFLW ===
2025 AAMI State Game
Friday, 11 April (18:30 ACST)	SANFL Women	def. by	VFL Women	Alberton Oval, Adelaide
0.1 (1); 1.6 (7); 2.11 (23); 4.12 (36)	Q1; Q2; Q3; Final	4.2 (26); 7.2 (44); 8.5 (53); 9.9 (63)	Best on ground players: Christina Leuzzi (SANFLW) & Tahlia Fellows (VFLW); Television broadcast: afl.com.au
L. Breguet, K. Lee, C. Leuzzi, K. Rosenzweig	Goals	T. Fellows 4 L. Williamson 2 E. Chaston, N. Dojiok, S. Whiting
C. Leuzzi, J. Bates, L. Ebert, Z. Venning, M. Anderson, T. King	Best	T. Fellows, A. Barba, D. Carbone, L. Williamson, E. Chaston, S. Casey

=== WAFLW vs SANFLW ===
2025 State Game
Saturday, 3 May (13:15 ACST)	SANFL Women	def.	WAFL Women	Adelaide Oval
2.0 (12); 3.1 (19); 4.2 (26); 6.5 (41)	Q1; Q2; Q3; Final	1.1 (7); 3.7 (25); 3.9 (27); 4.9 (33)	Best on ground players: Laela Ebert (SANFLW) & Lisa Steane (WAFLW)
L. Breguet, K. Lee 2, K. Rosenzweig, Z. Venning	Goals	I. Shannon, C. Lindgren, F. Dethlefsen, T. Ferguson
L. Ebert, J. Bates, L. Cutting, Z. Venning, S. Moon, K. Rosenzweig	Best	L. Steane, K. Petrevski, I. Shannon, J. Harken, T. Milder, S. Goranova

== See also ==
- 2025 SANFL season
