= 2024 SANFL Women's League season =

SANFL Women's League season

2024 SANFL Women's season
- Teams: 8
- Premiers: South Adelaide; 3rd premiership
- Minor premiers: South Adelaide; 3rd minor premiership
- Best and fairest: Nikki Nield; South Adelaide (27 votes)
- Leading goalkicker: Katelyn Rosenweig Central District (25 goals); Emily Brockhurst South Adelaide (25 goals)
- Matches played: 60

The 2024 SANFL Women's League season was the eighth season of the SANFL Women's League (SANFLW). The season commenced on 1 March and concluded with the Grand Final on 6 July, won by South Adelaide against Norwood, South Adelaide's third premiership.

The competition was contested by eight clubs, all of whom are affiliated with clubs from the men's South Australian National Football League (SANFL).

== Clubs ==
Club	Location	Home ground	Capacity
Central District	Elizabeth	X Convenience Oval	18,000
Glenelg	Glenelg	Stratarama Stadium	15,000
North Adelaide	Prospect	Prospect Oval	2,000
Norwood	Norwood	Coopers Stadium	10,000
South Adelaide	Noarlunga Downs	Magain Stadium	12,000
Sturt	Unley	Unley Oval	10,000
West Adelaide	Richmond	Hisense Stadium	9,000
Woodville-West Torrens	Woodville South	Maughan Thiem Kia Oval	15,000

== Ladder ==
Pos	Team	Pld	W	L	D	PF	PA	PP	Pts	Qualification
1	South Adelaide (P)	14	11	3	0	551	288	65.67	22	Finals series
2	Glenelg	14	9	4	1	486	485	50.05	19	Finals series
3	Central District	14	9	5	0	578	554	51.06	18	Finals series
4	Norwood	14	7	6	1	501	376	57.13	15	Finals series
5	Sturt	14	7	7	0	490	507	49.15	14	
6	West Adelaide	14	6	8	0	433	474	47.74	12	
7	Woodville-West Torrens	14	4	10	0	430	479	47.30	8	
8	North Adelaide	14	2	12	0	272	578	32.00	4	

Source: sanfl.com.au
Rules for classification: 1) points; 2) percentage; 3) number of points for.
(P) Premiers

== Finals series ==
=== First semi-final ===
	First Semi Final
Saturday, 22 June (2:50 pm)	Central District 5.5 (35)	def. by	Norwood 6.4 (40)	Flinders University Stadium	Report

=== Second semi-final ===
	Second Semi Final
Saturday, 22 June (12:30 pm)	South Adelaide 6.5 (41)	def.	Glenelg 1.7 (13)	Flinders University Stadium	Report

=== Preliminary final ===
	Preliminary Final
Saturday, 29 June (12:45 pm)	Glenelg 5.6 (36)	def. by	Norwood 8.7 (55)	Stratarama Stadium	Report

=== Grand Final ===
2024 SANFLW Grand Final
Saturday 6 July (4:05 pm)	South Adelaide	def.	Norwood	Coopers Stadium	Report
1.0 (6); 3.0 (18); 3.0 (18); 3.0 (18)	Q1; Q2; Q3; Final	0.0 (0); 0.1 (1); 1.1 (7); 2.1 (13)	Umpires: Abbott, Orr, Bayre; Best on ground: Jordann Hickey (South Adelaide); Television broadcast: Seven Network
M. Anderson, S. Archibold, L. Clifton	Goals	T. Buethke, A. Davies
J. Hickey, E. Schirmer, N. Nield	Best	C. Belbin, J. Halfpenny

== Awards ==
- SANFL Women's Best and Fairest

Nikki Nield – 27 votes (South Adelaide)

- Coaches Award

Jess Bates – 91 votes (Glenelg)

- Leading Goal Kicker Award

Katelyn Rosenzweig – 25 goals (Central District)
Emily Brockhurst – 25 goals (South Adelaide)

- Leadership Award

Annie Falkenberg (Woodville-West Torrens)

- Breakthrough Player

India Rasheed (Sturt)

- Development League Premiers

South Adelaide

2024 SANFL Women's Team of the Year
B:	Annie Falkenberg (vc) (Woodville-West Torrens)	Esther Schirmer (South Adelaide)	
HB:	Tahlita Buethke (Norwood)	Charlotte Riggs (Central District)	Laela Ebert (North Adelaide)
C:	Poppy Waterford (Woodville-West Torrens)	Jess Bates (Glenelg)	Monique Bessen (Sturt)
HF:	India Rasheed (Sturt)	Jade Halfpenny (Norwood)	Zoe Venning (West Adelaide)
F:	Emily Brockhurst (South Adelaide)	Kaitlyn Rosenzweig (Central District)	
Foll:	Soriah Moon (South Adelaide)	Nikki Nield (South Adelaide)	Shelby Smith (c) (Central District)
Int:	Violet Patterson (Glenelg)	Jasmine Evans (Central District)	Grace Martin (Woodville-West Torrens)
Int:	Jo Miller (Glenelg)	Jordann Hickey (South Adelaide)	
Coach:	Rick Watts (South Adelaide)		

== Representative match ==
The first ever women's state league interstate representative match was held in May, as the SANFLW defeated the WAFL Women's by 16 points in Perth.

2024 State Game
Saturday, 4 May (3:00 pm)	WAFL Women's	def. by	SANFL Women's	Optus Stadium
0.0 (0); 2.2 (14); 5.3 (33); 5.3 (33)	Q1; Q2; Q3; Final	3.1 (19); 4.2 (26); 6.3 (39); 7.7 (49)	Best on ground award: Jessica Bates (SANFLW)
Popovsky 2 Arnup, Ferguson, Fish 1	Goals	Gepp, Maher 2 Cockatoo-Motlap, Franson, Rosenzweig 1
Fish, Orme, Popovsky, Cameron, O'Hehir, Ortlepp, Bennett	Best	Bates, Smith, Wendland, Buethke, Button, Halfpenny, Waterford

== See also ==
- 2024 SANFL season
