= 2023 SANFL Women's League season =

SANFL Women's League season

2023 SANFL Women's season
- Teams: 8
- Premiers: Central District; 1st premiership
- Minor premiers: South Adelaide; 2nd minor premiership

The 2023 SANFL Women's League season was the seventh season of the SANFL Women's League (SANFLW). The season commenced on 17 February and concluded with the Grand Final on 11 June. The competition was contested by eight clubs, all of whom are affiliated with clubs from the men's South Australian National Football League (SANFL). Central District won their first women's league premiership, defeating South Adelaide by three points.

== Clubs ==
Club	Location	Home ground	Capacity
Central District	Elizabeth	X Convenience Oval	18,000
Glenelg	Glenelg	Stratarama Stadium	15,000
North Adelaide	Prospect	Prospect Oval	2,000
Norwood	Norwood	Coopers Stadium	10,000
South Adelaide	Noarlunga Downs	Magain Stadium	12,000
Sturt	Unley	Unley Oval	10,000
West Adelaide	Richmond	Hisense Stadium	9,000
Woodville-West Torrens	Woodville South	Maughan Thiem Kia Oval	15,000

== Ladder ==
Pos	Team	Pld	W	L	D	PF	PA	PP	Pts	Qualification
1	South Adelaide	12	10	2	0	328	295	52.65	20	Finals series
2	Central District	12	9	3	0	495	414	54.46	18	Finals series
3	Norwood	12	7	5	0	462	338	57.75	14	Finals series
4	Sturt	12	6	6	0	460	388	54.25	12	Finals series
5	Glenelg	12	6	6	0	358	390	47.86	12	
6	North Adelaide	12	4	8	0	452	444	50.45	8	
7	Woodville-West Torrens	12	3	8	1	326	451	41.96	7	
8	West Adelaide	12	2	9	1	288	449	39.08	5	

Source: sanfl.com.au
Rules for classification: 1) points; 2) percentage; 3) number of points for.

== Finals series ==
=== First semi-final ===
	First Semi Final
Sunday 28 May (2:10 pm)	Norwood 4.3 (27)	def.	Sturt 2.9 (21)	Flinders University Stadium	Report

=== Second semi-final ===
	Second Semi Final
Sunday 28 May (12:00 pm)	South Adelaide 4.4 (28)	def.	Central District 2.5 (17)	Flinders University Stadium	Report

=== Preliminary final ===
	Preliminary Final
Sunday 4 June (12:00 pm)	Central District 9.8 (62)	def.	Norwood 3.4 (22)	X Convenience Oval	Report

=== Grand Final ===
2023 SANFLW Grand Final
Sunday 11 June (2:15 pm)	South Adelaide	def. by	Central District	Prospect Oval (crowd: 3228)	Report
1.3 (9); 3.3 (21); 3.4 (22); 4.4 (28)	Q1; Q2; Q3; Final	0.1 (1); 1.1 (7); 2.6 (18); 4.7 (31)	Umpires: Smith, Abbott, Scott; Best on ground: Shelby Smith (Central District); Television broadcast: Seven Network
Northcott 2, Anderson, Hooper	Goals	Evans, Huynh, Riggs, Teague
Moon, Couch, Boileau, Northcott, Pratt	Best	Smith, Teague, Wendland, Riggs, Rosenzweig
A goal from Caitlen Teague in the last minute of the match gave Central District a three-point victory for the club's first SANFL Women's premiership.

== Awards ==
- SANFL Women's Best and Fairest

Piper Window – 19 votes (Glenelg)

- Coaches Award

Piper Window – 57 votes (Glenelg)

- Leading Goal Kicker Award

Katelyn Rosenzweig – 21 goals (Central District)

- Leadership Award

Kate Harris (Sturt)

- Maccas Moment Award

Lily Baxter (South Adelaide)

- Development League Premiers

South Adelaide
