= 2018 SANFL Women's League season =

2018 SANFL Women's season
- Teams: 6
- Premiers: South Adelaide; 1st premiership
- Minor premiers: South Adelaide; 1st minor premiership
- Best and fairest: Hannah Martin; West Adelaide (11 votes)
- Leading goalkicker: Katelyn Rosenzweig; North Adelaide (15 goals)

The 2018 SANFL Women's League season was the second season of the SANFL Women's League (SANFLW). The season commenced on 2 February and concluded with the Grand Final on 25 April 2018. The competition was contested by six clubs (two more than the previous season following the admission of South Adelaide and Sturt), each affiliated with clubs from the men's South Australian National Football League (SANFL).

== Clubs ==
- Glenelg
- North Adelaide
- Norwood
- South Adelaide
- Sturt
- West Adelaide

== Ladder ==
Pos	Team	Pld	W	L	D	PF	PA	PP	Pts	Qualification
1	South Adelaide (P)	10	9	1	0	448	129	77.64	18	Finals series
2	North Adelaide	10	7	3	0	482	234	67.32	14	Finals series
3	Norwood	10	5	5	0	254	230	52.48	10	Finals series
4	West Adelaide	10	5	5	0	310	310	50.00	10	
5	Sturt	10	3	7	0	204	512	28.49	6	
6	Glenelg	10	1	9	0	177	460	27.79	2	

Source: australianfootball.com
Rules for classification: 1) points; 2) percentage; 3) number of points for.
(P) Premiers

== Finals series ==
=== Preliminary final ===
	Preliminary final
Sunday 14 April (3:45 pm)	North Adelaide 1.4 (10)	def. by	Norwood 2.6 (18)	Prospect Oval	Report

=== Grand Final ===
2018 SANFLW Grand Final
Wednesday 25 April (4:00 pm)	South Adelaide	def.	Norwood	Unley Oval
0.3 (3); 2.5 (17); 3.6 (24); 4.6 (30)	Q1; Q2; Q3; Final	0.0 (0); 1.0 (6); 3.0 (18); 4.1 (25)	Best on ground: Cheyenne Hammond (South Adelaide); Television broadcast: SANFL.com.au
K. Harvey, A. Hatchard, C. Williams, C. Gum 1	Goals	R. McMahon, N. Burns, A. Browne, S. Riley 1
C. Hammond, N. Gore, A. Hatchard, C. Gum, K. Harvey, L. Whiteley	Best	M. Hollick, C. Tsoumbris, A. Browne, R. Busch, E. O'Dea, M. Reid
South Adelaide won their inaugural senior women's premiership.
