= 2019 SANFL Women's League season =

2019 SANFL Women's season
- Teams: 8
- Premiers: South Adelaide; 2nd premiership
- Minor premiers: Norwood; 1st minor premiership
- Best and fairest: Najwa Allen; Norwood (17 votes)
- Leading goalkicker: Kelly Barltrop; North Adelaide (26 goals)

The 2019 SANFL Women's League season was the third season of the SANFL Women's League (SANFLW). The season commenced on 15 February and concluded with the Grand Final on 26 May 2019. The competition was contested by eight clubs (two more than the previous season following the admission of Central District and Woodville-West Torrens), each affiliated with clubs from the men's South Australian National Football League (SANFL).

== Clubs ==
- Central District
- Glenelg
- North Adelaide
- Norwood
- South Adelaide
- Sturt
- West Adelaide
- Woodville-West Torrens

== Ladder ==
Pos	Team	Pld	W	L	D	PF	PA	PP	Pts	Qualification
1	Norwood	10	9	1	0	439	166	72.56	18	Finals series
2	South Adelaide (P)	10	8	2	0	421	241	63.60	16	Finals series
3	North Adelaide	10	7	3	0	480	242	66.48	14	Finals series
4	Glenelg	10	6	4	0	320	229	58.29	12	Finals series
5	West Adelaide	10	6	4	0	298	347	46.20	12	
6	Sturt	10	2	8	0	239	409	36.88	4	
7	Central District	10	2	8	0	225	473	32.23	4	
8	Woodville-West Torrens	10	0	10	0	227	542	29.52	0	

Source: australianfootball.com
Rules for classification: 1) points; 2) percentage; 3) number of points for.
(P) Premiers

== Finals series ==
=== First semi-final ===
	First semi-final
Friday 10 May (6:30 pm)	North Adelaide 4.1 (25)	def.	Glenelg 3.5 (23)	Norwood Oval	Report

=== Second semi-final ===
	Second semi-final
Friday 10 May (7:45 pm)	Norwood 3.3 (21)	def. by	South Adelaide 5.4 (34)	Norwood Oval	Report

=== Preliminary final ===
	Preliminary final
Friday 17 May (7:00 pm)	Norwood 1.10 (16)	def. by	North Adelaide 2.6 (18)	Norwood Oval	Report

=== Grand Final ===
2019 SANFLW Grand Final
Sunday 26 May (4:00 pm)	South Adelaide	def.	North Adelaide	Glenelg Oval
1.0 (6); 3.3 (21); 4.5 (29); 4.7 (31)	Q1; Q2; Q3; Final	0.0 (0); 1.0 (6); 1.2 (8); 1.3 (9)	Best on ground: Indy Tahau (South Adelaide); Television broadcast: SANFL.com.au
I. Tahau 2 T. Page, T. Charlton 1	Goals	L. Daniel 1
I. Tahau, J. Smith, M. McKinnon, N. Gore, C. Cavouras, E. Gryczewski	Best	N. von Bertouch, A. Davies, K. Howell, L. Daniel, A. Ward, S. Ellis
South Adelaide won their second senior women's premiership; they remain the only club in the competition to have won two consecutive premierships.
