= Brett Eddy =

Australian rules footballer (born 1989)

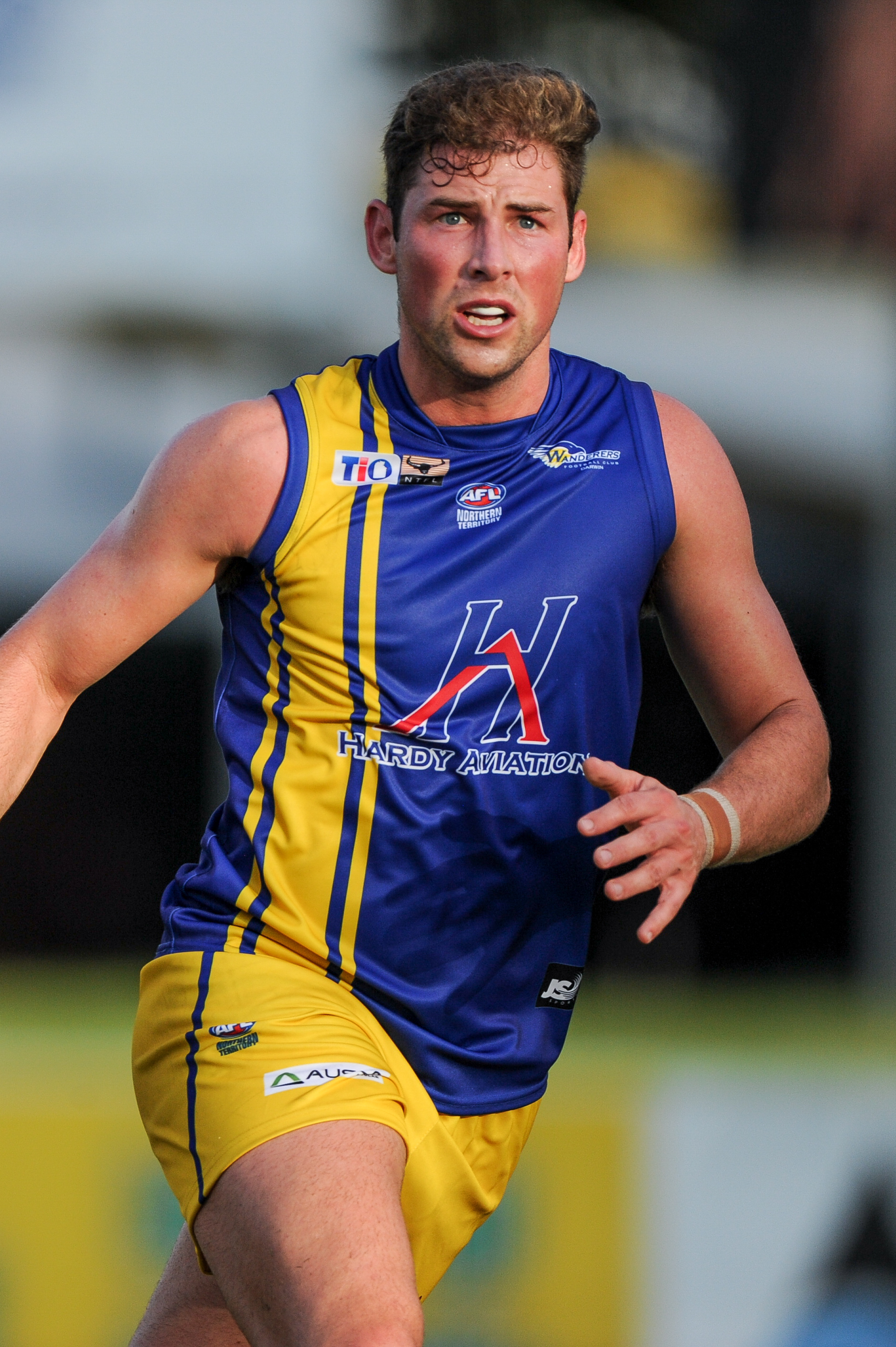
- Eddy playing for Wanderers in December 2017

Personal information
- Full name: Brett Eddy
- Nickname: Hollywood
- Born: 26 August 1989 (age 37); Gippsland, Victoria
- Original teams: Foster (AFNL), Sandringham (VFL), De La Salle (VAFA), Collingwood (VFL), South Adelaide (SANFL)
- Draft: No. 26, 2017 rookie draft
- Height: 193 cm (6 ft 4 in)
- Weight: 97 kg (214 lb)
- Position: Forward

Playing career^{1}
Years	Club	Games (Goals)
2013–2016	South Adelaide	72 (199)
2017	Port Adelaide	3 (3)
	Port Adelaide (SANFL)	20 (59)
- ^{1} Playing statistics correct to the end of 2017.

Career highlights
- 2× Ken Farmer Medallist (2016, 2017)

Brett Eddy (born 26 August 1989) is a former professional Australian rules footballer who played for the Port Adelaide Football Club in the Australian Football League (AFL).

== Victorian Football League ==
=== Collingwood ===
Eddy was previously listed with Collingwood's VFL team in 2011, he kicked 21 goals in eight games before injuring his ACL.

== South Australian National Football League ==
=== South Adelaide ===
He joined South Adelaide in 2013, playing for four seasons and having an impressive 2016 season kicking 74 goals and winning the Ken Farmer Medal. He was runner up for the medal in 2014 and 2015.

== Australian Football League ==
=== Port Adelaide ===
Eddy was drafted by Port Adelaide as a mature aged rookie with their 2nd pick, 26th overall, in the 2017 rookie draft.

He kicked five goals in a JLT Community Series match against Hawthorn at Hickinbotham Oval (South Adelaide's home ground, his former club).

He made his AFL debut in Round 1 against Sydney at the SCG. He was delisted by Port Adelaide at the conclusion of the 2017 season.
