= Peter Darley =

Australian rules footballer (born 1944)

Personal information
- Full name: Peter Darley
- Born: 1944 (age 81–82)
- Original team: Prince Alfred College
- Height: 6 ft 4 in (193 cm)
- Weight: 14 st 4 lb (91 kg)
- Position: Ruckman

Playing career^{1}
| Years | Club | Games (Goals) |
| 1962–74 | South Adelaide | 206 (123) |

Representative team honours
| Years | Team | Games (Goals) |
| | South Australia | 13 |

Coaching career^{3}
| Years | Club | Games (W–L–D) |
| 1967–69 | South Adelaide (SANFL) | 60 (22–39–1) |
- ^{1} Playing statistics correct to the end of 1974.^{3} Coaching statistics correct as of 1969.

Career highlights
- South Adelaide premiership 1964; South Adelaide captain 1967–1969, 1971; South Adelaide best and fairest 1963–64, 1966–68, 1972–73; South Adelaide leading goalkicker 1974; All-Australian 1969; South Australia captain 1968, 1970

Peter Darley (born 1944) is a former Australian rules footballer who played with South Adelaide in the South Australian National Football League (SANFL) during the 1960s and 1970s. He is a member of the first ruck in the club's official Team of the Century called the 'Greatest Team'.

Peter Darley, who was a ruckman, played in South Adelaide's 1964 premiership side. In the subsequent years South Adelaide struggled but Darley went on to win a record seven best and fairest awards for the club. His awards came in 1963, 1964, 1966 to 1968 and 1972 to 1973. He came close to winning the League best and fairest, the Magarey Medal, on two occasions; the first was in 1964 when he was runner-up, and the second came in 1968 when he tied with Barrie Robran on 22 votes but was ineligible due to a suspension earlier in the season for abusing an umpire.

From 1967 to 1969 he was captain-coach while in 1971 he captained the club but did not coach. He also topped South Adelaide's goalkicking once, with 44 goals in his final season.

He represented South Australia in 13 interstate game over the course of his career including as captain in 1968 and 1970. In 1969 he was chosen in the All-Australian team for his efforts at the Adelaide Carnival.

== Life after football ==
After retiring from football, Darley went into hospitality business. He spent the next 20 years buying, building up and selling pubs. While the business was good financially, it took a toll on his health, and soon after changing careers he gave up alcohol. In 2002 Darley was inducted into the South Australian Football Hall of Fame.

== Bibliography ==
- Atkinson, Graeme; Hanlon, Michael (1989). The 3AW Book of Footy Records. South Melbourne: Matchbooks. ISBN 1-86321-009-1.
