= 2017 SANFL Women's League season =

2017 SANFL Women's season
- Teams: 4
- Premiers: Norwood; 1st premiership
- Minor premiers: North Adelaide; 1st minor premiership
- Best and fairest: Courtney Gum; Glenelg (13 votes)
- Leading goalkicker: Chloe Scheer; North Adelaide (13 goals)

The 2017 SANFL Women's League season was the inaugural season of the SANFL Women's League (SANFLW). The season commenced on 17 February and concluded with the Grand Final on 1 April 2017. The competition was contested by four clubs, each affiliated with clubs from the men's South Australian National Football League (SANFL).

== Clubs ==
- Glenelg
- North Adelaide
- Norwood
- West Adelaide

== Ladder ==
Pos	Team	Pld	W	L	D	PF	PA	PP	Pts
1	North Adelaide	6	5	1	0	285	177	61.69	10
2	Norwood (P)	6	4	2	0	298	159	65.21	8
3	Glenelg	6	3	3	0	218	206	51.42	6
4	West Adelaide	6	0	6	0	134	393	25.43	0

Source: australianfootball.com
Rules for classification: 1) points; 2) percentage; 3) number of points for.
(P) Premiers

== Grand Final ==
2017 SANFLW Grand Final
Saturday 1 April (4:30 pm)	North Adelaide	def. by	Norwood	Unley Oval
3.1 (19); 4.2 (26); 6.2 (38); 6.2 (38)	Q1; Q2; Q3; Final	3.1 (19); 5.5 (35); 6.8 (44); 9.11 (65)	Best on ground: Sophie Li (Norwood); Television broadcast: SANFL.com.au
Norwood won their and the competition's inaugural senior women's premiership.
