= Danny Del-Re =

Australian rules footballer

Personal information
- Born: 12 February 1968 (age 58)
- Original team: Williamstown (VFA)
- Height: 188 cm (6 ft 2 in)
- Weight: 98 kg (216 lb)

Playing career^{1}
| Years | Club | Games (Goals) |
| 1990–1994 | Footscray | 62 (139) |
- ^{1} Playing statistics correct to the end of 1994.

Danny Del-Re (born 12 February 1968) is a former Australian rules footballer who played for Footscray in the AFL during the early 1990s.

Del-Re spent five seasons with Footscray, topping their goalkicking in 1992 and 1993. The 1992 season was his most prolific; he kicked 70 goals, including 13 in the finals. He kicked eight goals, a club record for a finals match, in the 1992 Qualifying Final against Geelong at the MCG. By 1994, Del-Re was playing mostly in the reserves, where he kicked nine goals in the preliminary final and three in the Grand Final win over North Melbourne.

Following the 1994 season, Del-Re was delisted by the Bulldogs and, despite nominating for November's AFL draft, was not chosen by any club.

He moved to SANFL club South Adelaide for 1995 and booted 90 goals to win the Ken Farmer Medal, including equalling "Diddy" Munro's club record when he kicked 12 goals against Sturt at Hickinbotham Oval. In 1996 he returned to Williamstown in the VFA, where he had played from 1987 to 1989 before moving to Footscray. He played with Williamstown until the end of 1999 and totalled 114 games and 246 goals. He was vice-captain of the team in his last two year with the Seagulls. Del-Re played in losing grand finals in 1988 and 1989 but did win a premiership with Williamstown Thirds in 1987, the year he made his senior debut. He was the club's leading goalkicker in 1998 with 60 goals and 1999 with 49 goals, and won the Club best and fairest award in 1998 and was runner-up in 1989. Del-Re was named at centre half-forward in the WFC 1990s Team-of-the-Decade.
