= Lapthorne =

Lapthorne is a surname. Notable people with the surname include:

- Andrew Lapthorne (born 1990), British wheelchair tennis player
- Darren Lapthorne (born 1983), Australian professional racing cyclist
- Len Lapthorne (1919–1997), Australian footballer
- Richard Lapthorne (born 1943), English company director

== See also ==
- Lapthorn
