= South Adelaide Football Club =

Australian rules football club

Names
- Full name: South Adelaide Football Club
- Nickname: Panthers
- Motto: "Visionary, Can-Do, United"

2025 season
- After finals: SANFL 8th SANFLW: 1st
- Leading goalkicker: SANFL: Corey Grocock (20); SANFLW: Shae Archbold (23)
- Best and fairest: SANFL: Oliver Davis; SANFLW: Soriah Moon

Club details
- Founded: 12 April 1876; 150 years ago
- Colours: Navy White
- Competition: South Australian National Football League (SANFL)
- Chairperson: Margaret Nyland
- Coach: SANFL: Jarrad Wright; SANFLW: Rick Watts
- Captain(s): SANFL: Oscar Clavarino; SANFLW: Jordann Hickey
- Premierships: SANFL (11): 1877; 1885; 1892; 1893; 1895; 1896; 1898; 1899; 1935; 1938; 1964; SANFLW (4): 2018; 2019; 2024; 2025
- Ground: Magain Stadium (capacity: 10,000)

Uniforms
Home

Other information
- Official website: safc.com.au

The South Adelaide Football Club, nicknamed the Panthers, is an Australian rules football club based in the Adelaide suburb of Noarlunga Downs. The club competes in the South Australian National Football League (SANFL) with Magain Stadium as its home ground.

The Panthers have won 11 senior men's premierships, the last being in 1964. The club is a dominant force in women's football, having won a record four women's league premierships, including back-to-back triumphs in 2018–2019 and 2024–2025.

South Adelaide Football Club is the owner of South Adelaide Netball Club and South Adelaide Volleyball Club, with all three clubs now under the Panthers brand. The partnership between these clubs is seen as an initiative to establish South Adelaide as the sporting hub for the southern community.

== History ==
=== Club formation and early years ===
The South Adelaide Football Club is one of the two surviving original members of the South Australian Football Association formed 30 April 1877 still competing in the SANFL, and has held its original colours (which were originally blue caps and long white trousers) longer than any other and has competed in every single season.

A meeting was held on Wednesday 12 April 1876 at the Draper Memorial Schoolroom, Adelaide in the evening for the purpose of forming a South Adelaide Football Club. There were more than thirty persons present and Mr. C. Simmonds presided. A set of rules was adopted, and the following officers were elected: President, Mr. A. G. Chapman; Vice-Presidents, Messrs G. Colyer, R. Couche, A. Farr, W. Holland, and M. C. Morris; Captain, Mr. George Kennedy; Vice Captain, Mr. Mehrtens; Committee, Messrs. Bridgland, Colbey, Cole, A. Holmesby, Jones, Simmonds, and Wallace; Treasurer, J. Holmesby; Secretary, C. C. Kingston. The code of playing rules passed by the leading Victorian Clubs in 1874 was discussed and adopted, and Messrs. Kennedy, Mehrtens, and Kingston were appointed delegates to confer with representatives from the other Clubs, with a view of considering the propriety of introducing the code generally throughout the colony.

On Wednesday 19 April 1876 at the General Havelock Hotel, The South Adelaide Football Club, which formed in 1875 and had its headquarters in the south east portion of the city, resolved without a dissentient that it should amalgamate with the new Club started this season to create one really good Club rather than two modest clubs. It was also proposed to move the practice ground to a new one on the Park Lands nearer to King William Street.

The new South Adelaide club played their first game on 20 May 1876 against the Victorian Club at Montefiore Hill which started at 3pm. George Kennedy an ex Carlton player was the club captain. After some hard work and several disputes over the rules of the game it ceased 2 hours later after the Victorians scored a goal. South Adelaide was joint SAFA Club Champions along with the Victorians in the inaugural SAFA season of 1877.

=== Golden era of success ===
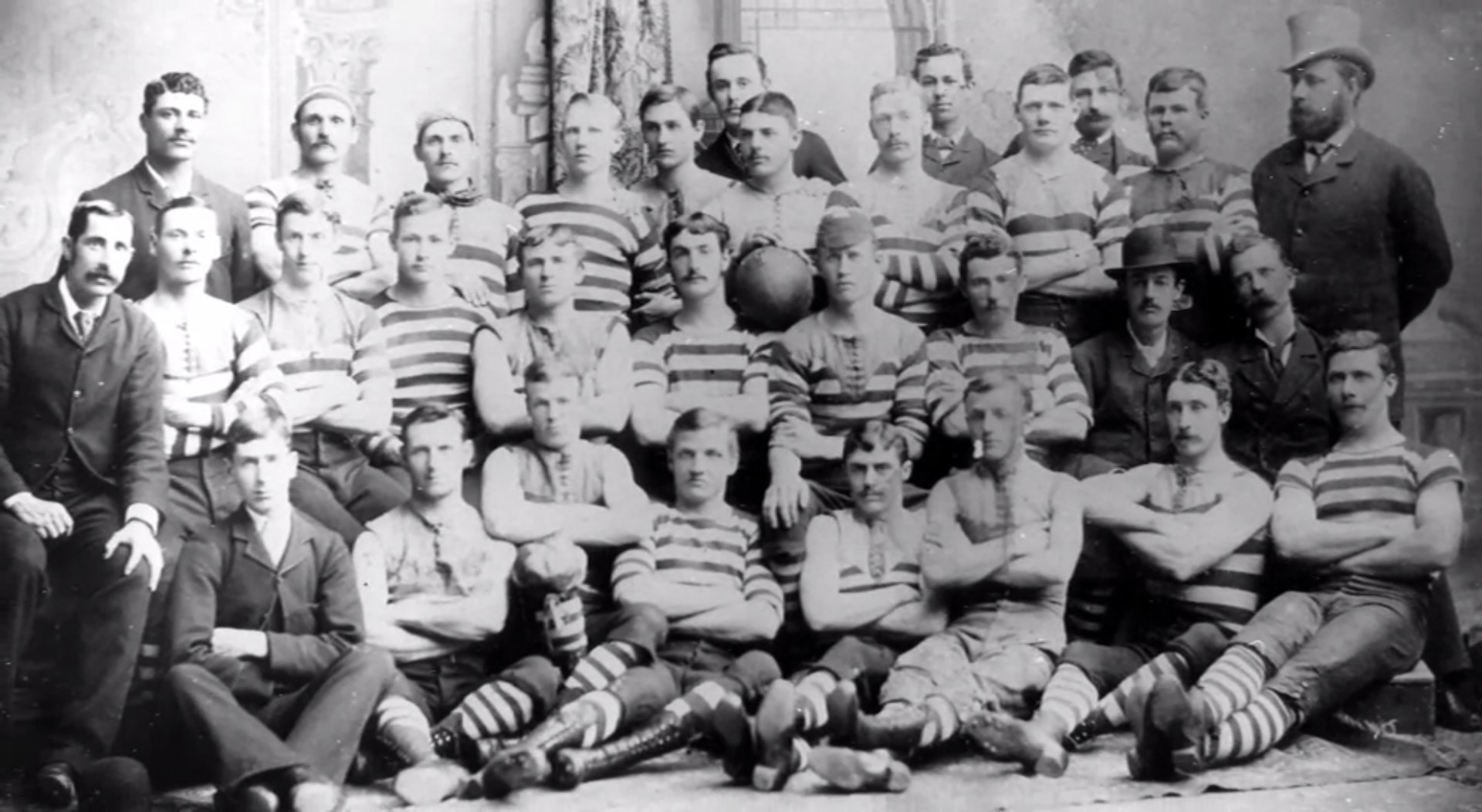
The 1885 premiership team

Between 1885 and 1900 South Adelaide won seven premierships (1885, 1892, 1893, 1895, 1896, 1898 and 1899) and was runner-up eight times between 1881 and 1903 (1881, 1882, 1886, 1894, 1897, 1900, 1902, 1903).

South Adelaide was led from 1888 to 1898 by captain and "proto-coach" Dinny Reedman who is generally seen as the first to view team combination and planning as a critical component of success in football. In 1896 they won sixteen and drew two of eighteen games.

=== Decline after district football ===
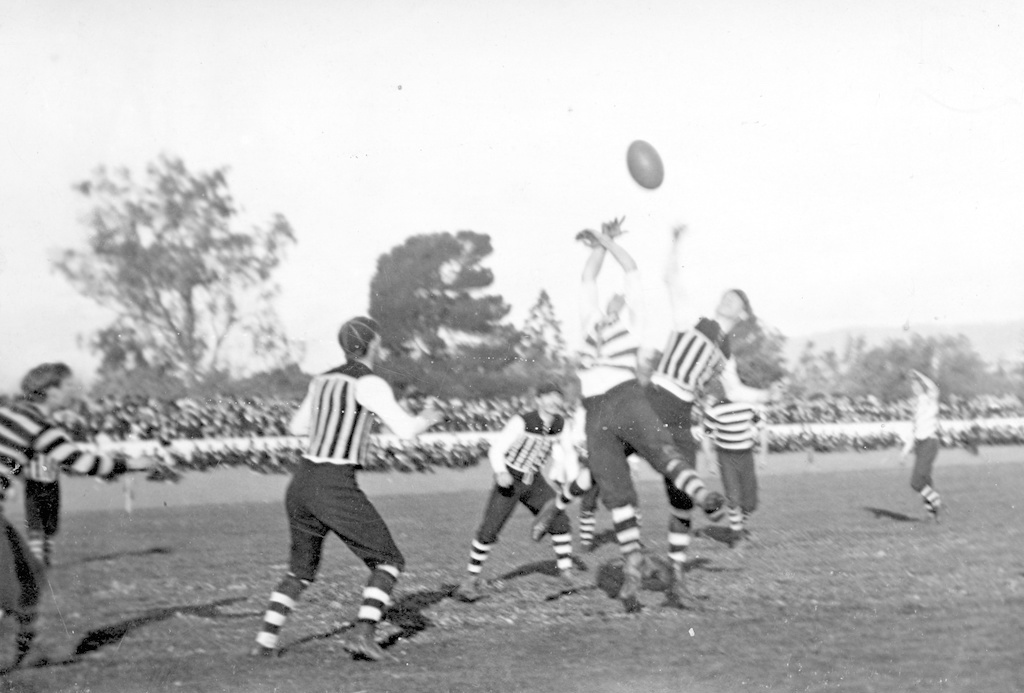
South Adelaide vs Port Adelaide 1903

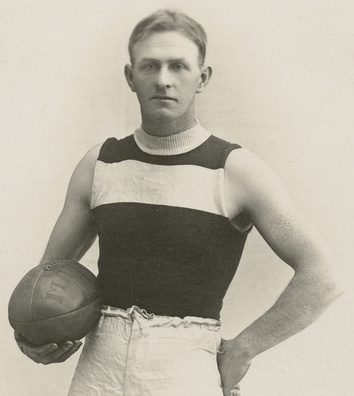
Jack Tredrea was the first South Australian league player to reach 200 games.

District football was introduced optionally in 1897 and became compulsory in 1899. This was difficult for South Adelaide, who had under Reedman obtained most of its top players from Christian Brothers College, and even in 1899 when it won its sixth premiership in eight years half its side came therefrom. With the loss of Reedman and Jones to North Adelaide, and after one season goalsneak "Bos" Daly to West Torrens in 1900, the blue and whites declined steadily. This was exacerbated by the admission of Sturt in 1901. South Adelaide was runner-up in 1903 to Port Adelaide, but won only 26 and drew two of 108 games between 1906 and 1914, including a winless season in 1909 and two consecutive one-win seasons (both wins by less than a goal) in 1910 and 1911. In 1915, South improved to second before lack of finals experience took its toll in the semi-final.

Following an enforced halt to SAFL football during World War I, the presence of champion defender Dan Moriarty made South highly competitive between 1919 and 1924, though it never rose above third in 1921. However, after his retirement South took four consecutive wooden spoons from 1926 to 1929 and did not finish above sixth in an eight-team competition between 1925 and 1934, winning only thirty and drawing three of 164 games. It was generally known that South had an unfairly small share of the area zoned between eight league clubs, but the league committee refused to alter the status quo.

=== Brief halcyon and abrupt fall ===
In response to South Adelaide's limited metropolitan recruiting resources, the club began a concerted country recruiting campaign during the 1930s. This bore spectacular fruit between 1935 and 1940. Under coach Vic Johnson, South Adelaide after a slow start played impressive football throughout 1935 and ultimately upset Port Adelaide for its first premiership since 1899. Jack Cockburn at centre half-back was the team's star and won the Magarey Medal. After two more seasons in the finals, South Adelaide reached a high point in 1938, losing only two games and swamping Port Adelaide with a 13-goal third quarter in the Grand Final. Led by Clem Rosewarne, Max Murdy and Len Lapthorne, South averaged an amazing 132 points per game, and even without Rosewarne their attack remained extremely potent in 1939 and 1940, averaging 125 points over the minor round. The blue and whites failed badly in the 1939 finals, but won two finals before losing to Sturt in 1940.

1941 saw South slip to fifth with only six wins, but that could hardly have prepared them for the experiences of the two decades after full-scale football resumed following World War II. (Note: Between 1942 and 1944 the SANFL contested a restricted, four team competition with its eight member clubs paired off geographically: Port Adelaide-West Torrens; Norwood-North Adelaide; West Adelaide-Glenelg and South Adelaide-Sturt) Between 1947 and 1951 South won only seven games out of eighty-six, and from 1945 to 1963 South never won more than six games in a season, nor finished above any rival except Glenelg and Sturt. Other clubs with greater financial resources duplicated South's 1930s country recruiting campaigns and the club turned over coaches at an extraordinary rate. Eight coaches were employed in nine seasons from 1953 to 1961: even a spell by Port Adelaide legend "Fos" Williams in 1960 failed to raise them above second last, and neither did the adoption of the club's current nickname "The Panthers" in 1957

=== Kerley and another decline ===
In 1959, after doubting whether the club was viable as a league team, the SANFL granted South Adelaide a substantial area of newly developing southern Adelaide suburbs. During the early 1960s it became apparent that South Adelaide, though only marginally better statistically than the dreadful late 1940s and early 1950s teams, was possessed of enough talent to move beyond the bottom couple of placings. In 1963, South Adelaide sought the services of proven West Adelaide player/coach Neil Kerley after he was controversially sacked by the Bloods, and despite being sceptical Kerley did accept and put the team on an intense training schedule during the 1963/1964 off-season.

South Adelaide rose rapidly in 1964, losing only three minor round games before defeating Port Adelaide by 27 points in the Grand Final. It remained prominent for the remaining two years of Kerley's stint but failed to make the grand final. However, under champion player Peter Darley as captain-coach the Panthers declined very quickly owing to the loss of key followers Kerley and David Kantilla, winning only two games in 1969 for another wooden spoon and not improving until another renowned coach in Haydn Bunton, Jr. took over the reins in 1975. Under Bunton, the Panthers, playing fast, skilful football firmly rooted in the South "tradition", contested the major round for the first time in eleven years in 1977 and reached the Grand Final in 1979. However, on an appallingly windy day and muddy ground the experienced Port Adelaide, aided by winning the toss, were too good, winning 9-9 (63) to 3-14 (32). The Panthers fluctuated in yo-yo fashion under Bunton, never playing in two consecutive finals series before he departed to return to Subiaco after a sabbatical at the end of 1982.

=== Noarlunga ===
In 1979, South Adelaide's recruiting zone in the southern suburbs was extended to cover all the developing areas around O‘Halloran Hill, giving the club a potential community base for the first time in its long history. It continued to play at Adelaide Oval until 1994 (the oval was ironically located on the northern side of the City of Adelaide and River Torrens), and its fortunes fluctuated, with two unsuccessful finals appearances under future Adelaide Crows coach Graham Cornes in 1983 and 1984 being followed by free-fall under the coaching of former Hawthorn (VFL) ruckman Don Scott and Sturt champion full forward Rick Davies to a wooden spoon in 1987. South was under severe pressure to enter into a merger with another SANFL club, but was argued that if South made the long-proposed move to Noarlunga it would be able to capture expanding suburbs in the future.

Under John Reid, South developed rapidly after a one-win season and twenty-six successive losses during 1988 and early 1989. After this disastrous losing streak, South rose to contest each SANFL finals series between 1990 and 1992, with a minor premiership in 1991 the highlight, the Panthers being bundled out by West Adelaide in the Preliminary Final. The next 20 seasons saw some dubious coaching changes such as the sacking of former St Kilda coach Ken Sheldon in 1996, and briefly employing seventy-one-year-old veteran John Cahill during 2008. After this, the Panthers won only four games in the 2009 and 2010 seasons for their worst two-season record since the dark days of 1950 and 1951.

The Panthers were lacking in success until 2006 when they reached a semi final and again in 2011. The 2010s and early 2020s saw some finals action and helped cement the club as a competitor in the league. In 2014 they finished third, losing a preliminary final to Port Adelaide. In 2016 they finished the minor round second but were knocked out the finals in straight sets. In 2018 they lost an elimination final to eventual Premier North Adelaide. In 2020 and 2021 they reached back-to-back Preliminary Finals but unfortunately couldn’t go that one step further.

Three South Australian Premiers have had a close association with the South Adelaide Football Club: Charles Cameron Kingston (Premier 1893–1899), Dean Brown (1993–96) and Mike Rann (2002–2011). Kingston played for South Adelaide, Dean Brown became Patron and Mike Rann was Number One Ticket Holder. During his Premiership Rann presented the club with a 100-year peppercorn lease over the Noarlunga Oval site owned by the State Government in what he described as 'land rights for the Panthers'. The club presented the Premier with 100 peppercorns.

South Adelaide entered a team in the SANFL Women's League in 2018. In their short history fielding a women's team, they have become the most successful team in the competition, winning back-to-back premierships in 2018/19.

== Home grounds ==
Home grounds

- South Parklands, Adelaide (1876–1881)
- Adelaide Oval, North Adelaide (1882–1903, 1905–94)
- Jubilee Oval, Adelaide (1904)
- Magain Stadium, Noarlunga Downs (1995–present)

Training grounds

- South Parklands, Adelaide (1876–1903, 1915)
- Jubilee Oval, Adelaide (1904–1914, 1916–1926)
- Adelaide Oval, North Adelaide (1927–70)
- Panther Park, St Marys (1971–94)
- Magain Stadium, Noarlunga Downs (1995–present)

In 1969 South Road Recreation Ground at St Marys, South Australia, later renamed Panther Park, was earmarked to be South's new home ground with plans to build a grandstand, but only the change rooms were built and it was used as a training base and for South's junior teams. South Adelaide's clubrooms were based at Panther Park, but home games continued to be played at Adelaide Oval until 1995, when the club moved to Noarlunga and its new ground Magain Stadium (then called Noarlunga Oval). With the exception of 1904, when they played at the now defunct Jubilee Oval, the Panthers played all their home games at the Adelaide Oval (ironically located on the northern side of the Adelaide city centre), while in 1992 and 1993 they played two games at the Bice Oval in the southern suburb of Christies Beach to gauge support in the area for the Panthers. The oval, located only 1 kilometre or 0.6 miles from where Hickinbotham Oval now sits, was packed to capacity in 1993 with approximately 8,000 crammed in to see South take on "local" rival Glenelg. Following this game the South Adelaide Football Club made the decision to move permanently to Noarlunga.

South Adelaide christened their new home at Noarlunga in Round 8 of the 1995 SANFL season. The opening game at Noarlunga also saw the ground record crowd of 10,123 when Glenelg defeated the Panthers by 47 points. Originally called Noarlunga Oval, the name was officially changed to Hickinbotham Oval in 2005 to honour former Panther and successful property developer, the late Alan Hickinbotham.

In late 2010 the South Adelaide Football Club obtained permission from the City of Onkaparinga to install four light towers at the oval with the intent to host night SANFL games at the venue. Unlike other SANFL grounds which had lights installed, Hickenbotham Oval is not surrounded by housing and permission to build the lights was easily obtained as they were ruled to have minimal impact on the local residents. The first game played under lights on 9 April 2011 saw South defeat North Adelaide in front of 2,630. The record night attendance at the oval was set just a few weeks later in Round 4 of the 2011 SANFL season when 2,700 saw the clash between the Panthers and Port Adelaide.

== Club records ==
- Record attendance at Hickinbotham Oval: 10,123 v Glenelg in Round 8, 1995
- Record night attendance at Hickinbotham Oval: 2,700 v Port Adelaide in Round 4, 2011
- Record attendance at Adelaide Oval (minor round): 30,618 v Port Adelaide in Round 2, 1965
- Record attendance: 56,353 v Port Adelaide at Adelaide Oval, 1964 SANFL Grand Final
- Record attendance at Football Park: 50,428 v Port Adelaide, 1979 SANFL Grand Final
- Most games: 337 by Stuart Palmer (1969–85)
- Most goals in a season: 115 by Chris Munro in 1935
- Most goals in a match:
  - 12 by Chris Munro v Glenelg, 6 June 1936
  - 12 by Danny Del-Re v Sturt, 29 July 1995
- Most goals for the club: 380 by Chris Munro (1932–37)
- Most years as coach: 9 by Jarrad Wright (2018–26)
- Most years as captain: 11 by Jack Reedman (1888–98)
- Most premierships as captain: 5 by Jack Reedman (1892, 1893, 1895, 1896, 1898)
- SANFL leading goal kicker: R Wardrop (1882), Alf Bushby (1887), Jack Kay (1896, 1898, 1902), Stanley Scott (1945), Danny Del-Re (1995), Michael Wundke (2011, 2013), Brett Eddy (2016)
- SANFL Ken Farmer Medallists: Danny Del-Re (1995), Michael Wundke (2011), Brett Eddy (2016)
- Most Best & Fairest Awards: 7 by Peter Darley (1963, 1964, 1966, 1967, 1968, 1972, 1973)
- Highest score: 39.16 (250) v Woodville 19.14 (128) at Football Park in Round 14, 1984

== Honours ==
=== Club ===
Premierships
| Competition | Level | Wins | Years won |
| South Australian National Football League | Men's Seniors | 11 | 1877, 1885, 1892, 1893, 1895, 1896, 1898, 1899, 1935, 1938, 1964 |
| South Australian National Football League | Women's Seniors | 4 | 2018, 2019, 2024, 2025 |
| South Australian National Football League | Men's Reserves | 4 | 1914, 1979, 1991, 2026 |
| South Australian National Football League | Men's 2nd Twenty | 2 | 1878,1879 |
| South Australian National Football League | Women's Reserves (Note: The second-tier of women's competition was officially referred to as the "Development League".) (2022–2025) | 2 | 2023, 2024 |
| South Australian National Football League | Under 19s (1937–2008) | 2 | 1993, 1994 |
| South Australian National Football League | Under 17s (1939–2008) | 2 | 1990, 1995 |
| South Australian National Football League | Under 16s (2010–present) | 1 | 2021 |
Other titles and honours
| Championship of Australia | Men's Seniors | 1 | 1898 |
| NFL Night Series (Australia) | Men's Seniors | 2 | 1978, 1979 |
| Stanley H Lewis Trophy | Men's Seniors | 1 | 1991 |
| SANFL Night Series | Men's Seniors | 3 | 1984, 1986, 1991 |
| SANFL Fast Footy | Men's Seniors | 1 | 2018 |
Finishing positions
| South Australian National Football League | Minor premiership (men's seniors) | 4 | 1898, 1899, 1938, 1991 |
| South Australian National Football League | Grand Finalists (men's seniors) | 11 | 1881, 1882, 1886, 1894, 1897, 1900, 1902, 1903, 1937, 1940, 1979 |
| South Australian National Football League | Wooden spoons (men's seniors) | 27 | 1909, 1910, 1911, 1926, 1927, 1928, 1929, 1932, 1934, 1945, 1947, 1948, 1950, 1951, 1953, 1955, 1957, 1959, 1962, 1963, 1969, 1970, 1987, 1988, 1997, 2009, 2010 |
| South Australian National Football League | Minor premiership (women's seniors) | 3 | 2018, 2023, 2024 |
| South Australian National Football League | Grand Finalists (women's seniors) | 2 | 2020, 2023 |

=== Individual ===
==== Magarey Medallists ====
- Frank Barry (1915)
- Dan Moriarty (1919, 1920, 1921)
- Jack Cockburn (1935)
- Jim Deane (1953, 1957 – awarded retrospectively)
- Mark Naley (1991)
- Andrew Osborn (1998)
- Joel Cross (2012)
- Joel Cross (2015)
- Bryce Gibbs (2021)

==== All-Australians ====
- Peter Darley 1969
- Mark Naley 1986

==== League top goalkickers (Ken Farmer Medal since 1981) ====
The Ken Farmer Medal is awarded to the South Australian Football League's (SANFL) top goalkicker at the end of the home-and-away matches each season and was instigated in 1981.

| Year | Goals | Player |
|---|---|---|
| 1882 | 14 | R. Wardrop |
| 1885 | 19 | H. Hill |
| 1887 | 25 | Alf Bushby |
| 1896 | 25 | Jack Kay |
| 1898 | 35 | Jack Kay |
| 1902 | 28 | Jack Kay |
| 1945 | 64 | Stanley Scott |
| 1995 | 95 | Danny Del-Re |
| 2011 | 67 | Michael Wundke |
| 2013 | 52 | Michael Wundke |
| 2016 | 68 | Brett Eddy |

=== 'Greatest Team' ===
The South Adelaide Team of the Century is officially called the 'Greatest Team'.

Greatest Team
| B: | Jack Reedman (captain) | Bill Oliver | George Mulcahy |
| HB: | Bob Schmidt | Dan Moriarty | Jack Cockburn |
| C: | Laurie Cahill | Jim Deane | Mark Coombe |
| HF: | Max Murdy | Don Pryor | Alf 'Bulla' Ryan |
| F: | Mark Naley | Chris Munro | Jack Dawes |
| Foll: | Peter Darley | Jack Tredrea | Frank Tully |
| Int: | Lindsay Backman | Ray Linke | Len Lapthorne |
| Coach: | – | | |

=== Honour board ===
South Adelaide Football Club Honour board
| Year | Pos | W–L–D | Coach | Captain | Best & Fairest | Top Goalkicker | Goals |
|---|---|---|---|---|---|---|---|
| 1876 | 2 (Runner up) | 4–1–4 | —N/a | G. D. Kennedy | —N/a | G. D. Kennedy | 2 |
Formation of the South Australian Football Association
| 1877 | 1 (Premiers) | | —N/a | G. D. Kennedy | —N/a | W. H. J. (Billy) Dedman | 10 |
| 1878 | 3 | | —N/a | G. D. Kennedy A. C. Mehrtens | —N/a | | 2 2 |
| 1879 | 3 | | —N/a | S. A. Wallace | —N/a | | 2 |
| 1880 | 3 | | —N/a | J. H. Sinclair A. C. Mehrtens | —N/a | | 9 |
| 1881 | 2 (Runner up) | | —N/a | A. C. Mehrtens T. Maloney | —N/a | | 8 |
| 1882 | 2 (Runner up) | | —N/a | A. C. Mehrtens | —N/a | | 13 |
| 1883 | 8 | | —N/a | A. C. Mehrtens H. R. Hill | —N/a | | 8 |
| 1884 | 3 | | —N/a | A. C. Mehrtens | —N/a | | 12 |
| 1885 | 1 (Premiers) | | —N/a | A. J. Hall | —N/a | H. R. Hill | 19 |
| 1886 | 2 (Runner up) | | —N/a | A. McIntyre | F. Mehrtens | | 8 |
| 1887 | 4 | | —N/a | W. H. Watling | —N/a | | 22 |
| 1888 | 4 | | —N/a | W. H. Watling | —N/a | | 15 |
| 1889 | 5 | | —N/a | G. J. Rowley A. Hammond J. C. Reedman | —N/a | | 8 |
| 1890 | 3 | | —N/a | J. C. Reedman | —N/a | | 13 |
| 1891 | 3 | | —N/a | J. C. Reedman | —N/a | | 24 |
| 1892 | 1 (Premiers) | | —N/a | J. C. Reedman | —N/a | | 26 |
| 1893 | 1 (Premiers) | | —N/a | J. C. Reedman | —N/a | | 16 16 |
| 1894 | 2 (Runner up) | | —N/a | J. C. Reedman | —N/a | | 21 |
| 1895 | 1 (Premiers) | | —N/a | J. C. Reedman | —N/a | | 32 |
| 1896 | 1 (Premiers) | | —N/a | J. C. Reedman | —N/a | J. L. Kay | 25 |
| 1897 | 2 (Grand Finalist) | | —N/a | J. C. Reedman | —N/a | A. C. Marlow | 26 |
| 1898 | 1 (Premiers) | 12–2 | —N/a | J. C. Reedman | —N/a | J. L. Kay | 35 |
| 1899 | 1 (Premiers) | 11–3 | —N/a | A. E. Tomlin | —N/a | A. D. Daly | 32 |
| 1900 | 2 (Grand Finalist) | 9–5 | —N/a | S. E. Reedman | —N/a | J. O. O'Dea | 16 |
| 1901 | 4 | 7–10 | —N/a | H. A. Kruss | —N/a | J. Cheek | 18 |
| 1902 | 2 (Grand Finalist) | 8–3–1 | —N/a | S. E. Reedman | —N/a | J. L. Kay | 28 |
| 1903 | 2 (Grand Finalist) | 4–6–2 | —N/a | S. E. Reedman J. Kay | —N/a | J. L. Kay | 18 |
| 1904 | 3 | 7–5 | —N/a | J. Kay | —N/a | J. L. Kay | 23 |
| 1905 | 4 | 5–6–1 | —N/a | S. E. Reedman J. P. Hansen | —N/a | | |
| 1906 | 5 | 4–6–2 | —N/a | A. Morton | —N/a | | |
South Australian Football League
| 1907 | 5 | 4–8 | —N/a | J. B. Windsor | —N/a | F. I. Hansen | 28 |
| 1908 | 6 | 3–9 | F. T. O'Brien | F. T. O'Brien | —N/a | F. I. Hansen | 30 |
| 1909 | 7 (Wooden Spoon) | 0–12 | G. Wallace | D. V. McDougall | | F. I. Hansen | 19 |
| 1909 | 7 (Wooden Spoon) | 0–12 | Jack Tredrea | D. V. McDougall | | F. I. Hansen | 19 |
| 1910 | 7 (Wooden Spoon) | 1–11 | T. M. Thomas | Jack Tredrea | | W. Murdoch | 7 |
| 1910 | 7 (Wooden Spoon) | 1–11 | T. M. Thomas | Jack Tredrea | | E. M. Jones | 7 |
| 1910 | 7 (Wooden Spoon) | 1–11 | T. M. Thomas | Jack Tredrea | | W. Job | 7 |
| 1910 | 7 (Wooden Spoon) | 1–11 | T. M. Thomas | Jack Tredrea | | H. V. Conrad | 7 |
| 1911 | 7 (Wooden Spoon) | 1–11 | T. M. Thomas | Jack Tredrea | —N/a | C. Warburton | 10 |
| 1912 | 5 | 4–8 | J. C. Reedman | Jack Tredrea | —N/a | L. S. Waye | 11 |
| 1913 | 5 | 5–7 | T. M. Thomas | Jack Tredrea | —N/a | G. Wallace | 9 |
| 1914 | 6 | 4–8 | Bert Renfrey | Jack Tredrea | —N/a | J. N. Hansen | 19 |
| 1915 | 3 | 8–3–1 | Bert Renfrey | Jack Tredrea | —N/a | G. Wallace | 15 |
Competition suspended due to WWI
| 1919 | 5 | 4–7–1 | Bert Renfrey | S. N. McKee | —N/a | S. N. McKee | 18 |
| 1920 | 6 | 5–7 | G. Wallace | S. N. McKee | —N/a | S. N. McKee | 26 |
| 1921 | 3 | 9–5 | Jack Tredrea | S. N. McKee | —N/a | S. N. McKee | 40 |
| 1922 | 4 | 8–6 | Jack Tredrea | S. N. McKee | —N/a | S. N. McKee | 28 |
| 1923 | 3 | 9–5 | Jack Tredrea | A. F. Caust | Dan Moriarty | J. W. Daly | 24 |
| 1924 | 5 | 9–5 | —N/a | A. F. Caust | A. J. Ryan | A. J. Ryan | 52 |
| 1925 | 7 | 4–10 | —N/a | Dan Moriarty | W. G. Oliver | A. J. Ryan | 57 |
| 1926 | 8 (Wooden Spoon) | 0–13–1 | Sampson Hosking | W. G. Oliver | W. G. Oliver | A. J. Ryan | 53 |
South Australian National Football League
| 1927 | 8 (Wooden Spoon) | 2–15 | A. J. Ryan | W. G. Oliver | W. H. Jackson | A. J. Ryan | 55 |
| 1927 | 8 (Wooden Spoon) | 2–15 | W. T. Oliver | W. G. Oliver | W. H. Jackson | A. J. Ryan | 55 |
| 1928 | 8 (Wooden Spoon) | 2–14–1 | A. H. Job | H. Lingwood-Smith | A. J. Ryan | George Margitich | 47 |
| 1929 | 8 (Wooden Spoon) | 3–14 | A. H. Job | W. G. Oliver | F. J. Tully | George Margitich | 74 |
| 1930 | 6 | 6–11 | H. B. McGregor | S. R. Jaffer | F. J. Tully | A. J. Ryan | 35 |
| 1931 | 7 | 4–13 | Jack Tredrea | S. R. Jaffer | S. R. Jaffer | P. W. Gardiner | 37 |
| 1932 | 8 (Wooden Spoon) | 2–14–1 | H. B. McGregor | H. B. McGregor | C. R. Rose | C. G. Hall | 32 |
| 1933 | 7 | 3–14 | S. R. Jaffer | S. R. Jaffer | F. J. Tully | Chris Munro | 72 |
| 1934 | 8 (Wooden Spoon) | 4–13 | Frank Golding | C. R. Rose | Jack Cockburn | Chris Munro | 74 |
| 1935 | 1 (Premiers) | 11–6 | W. V. Johnson | F. J. Tully | F. J. Tully | Chris Munro | 115 |
| 1936 | 4 | 11–6 | W. V. Johnson | F. J. Tully | G. L. Mulcahy | Chris Munro | 92 |
| 1936 | 4 | 11–6 | W. V. Johnson | F. J. Tully | J. P. Dawes | Chris Munro | 92 |
| 1937 | 2 (Grand Finalist) | 11–6 | L. J. Ashby | W. J. McKay | J. P. Dawes | J. P. Dawes | 54 |
| 1938 | 1 (Premiers) | 15–2 | L. J. Ashby | J. P. Dawes | Laurie Cahill | C. R. Rosewarne | 82 |
| 1939 | 3 | 12–5 | L. J. Ashby | J. P. Dawes | Laurie Cahill | W. E. Isaac | 63 |
| 1940 | 2 (Grand Finalist) | 12–5 | L. J. Ashby | J. P. Dawes | M. A. Murdy | W. E. Isaac | 90 |
| 1941 | 5 | 6–11 | L. J. Ashby | J. P. Dawes | Jack Cockburn | L. Rushby | 42 |
Merger with Sturt due to WWII
| 1942 | | | J. P. Dawes L. F. E. Rusby | J. P. Dawes | | | |
| 1943 | | | L. F. E. Rusby L. J. Ashby | J. P. Dawes | | | |
| 1944 | | | L. J. Ashby | J. P. Dawes | | | |
Competition returns to unaligned teams
| 1945 | 8 (Wooden Spoon) | 3–14 | L. Ashby | C. Ames | M. Doherty | Stanley Scott | 64 |
| 1946 | 7 | 5–12 | M. Murdy | J. Templeton | K. Brown | Len Lapthorne | 29 |
| 1947 | 8 (Wooden Spoon) | 2–15 | Laurie Cahill | D. Pryor | Alan Hickinbotham | D Pryor | 51 |
| 1948 | 8 (Wooden Spoon) | 0–17 | Laurie Cahill | D. Pryor | Jim Deane | Len Lapthorne | 23 |
| 1949 | 7 | 4–13 | Jim Deane | Len Lapthorne | Jim Deane | M. Merchant | 35 |
| 1950 | 8 (Wooden Spoon) | 0–17 | Jim Deane | Len Lapthorne | R. Linke | Len Lapthorne | 27 |
| 1951 | 8 (Wooden Spoon) | 1–17 | Jim Deane | | Jim Deane | Len Lapthorne | 47 |
| 1952 | 7 | 5–12 | Jim Deane | | R. Linke | M. Read | 47 |
| 1953 | 8 (Wooden Spoon) | 5–13 | Jim Deane | | Jim Deane | M. Read | 47 |
| 1954 | 7 | 5–13 | Alan Hickinbotham | | R. Linke | M. Read | 46 |
| 1955 | 8 (Wooden Spoon) | 2–15 | Jack Graham | R. Hewitt | D. Polden | J. Judd | 25 |
| 1956 | 7 | 6–12 | P. Hunt | Jim Deane | Jim Deane | J. Judd | 38 |
| 1957 | 8 (Wooden Spoon) | 2–16 | Laurie Cahill | Jim Deane | Jim Deane | K Peucker | 37 |
| 1958 | 6 | 6–11–1 | R. Reiman | | G. Christie | J. Judd | 37 |
| 1959 | 8 (Wooden Spoon) | 3–15 | R. Reiman | | R. Jackson | J. Judd | 52 |
| 1960 | 7 | 3–15 | Fos Williams | D. Panizza | D. Panizza | D. Panizza | 22 |
| 1961 | 6 | 5–14 | W. Sutherland | G. Christie | David Kantilla | David Kantilla | 31 |
| 1962 | 8 (Wooden Spoon) | 3–16 | W. Sutherland | G. Christie | David Kantilla | L Backman | 45 |
| 1963 | 8 (Wooden Spoon) | 2–18 | W Sutherland; D. Parham | I. Day | Peter Darley | L. Backman | 34 |
| 1964 | 1 (Premiers) | 17–3 | Neil Kerley | | Peter Darley | I. Day | 35 |
| 1965 | 3 | 15–5 | Neil Kerley | | R. Schmidt | L. Backman | 41 |
| 1966 | 4 | 14–6 | Neil Kerley | | Peter Darley | A. Skuse | 38 |
| 1967 | 5 | 11–9 | Peter Darley | | Peter Darley | L. Backman | 31 |
| 1968 | 6 | 9–10–1 | Peter Darley | | Peter Darley | P. Jones | 32 |
| 1969 | 10 (Wooden Spoon) | 2–18 | Peter Darley | | M. Coombe | L. Backman | 42 |
| 1970 | 10 (Wooden Spoon) | 3–17 | Jim Deane | L. Backman | L. Backman | P. Howlett | 60 |
| 1971 | 9 | 6–15 | Jim Deane | Peter Darley | P. Haines | P. Howlett | 50 |
| 1972 | 9 | 5–16 | Dave Darcy | | Peter Darley | P. Jones | 30 |
| 1973 | 9 | 4–17 | Dave Darcy | | Peter Darley | M. Dittmar | 60 |
| 1974 | 8 | 7–15 | Dave Darcy | Bob Keddie | David Young | P. Darley | 44 |
| 1975 | 8 | 5–13 | Haydn Bunton, Jr | Bob Keddie | Bob Keddie | Graham Robbins | 50 |
| 1976 | 7 | 9–11–1 | Haydn Bunton, Jr | Bob Keddie | Ron Hateley | Andy Bennett | 67 |
| 1977 | 4 | 14–8 | Haydn Bunton, Jr | G. Robbins | G. Baynes | Wayne Slattery | 54 |
| 1978 | 7 | 8–13–1 | Haydn Bunton, Jr | G. Baynes | G. Baynes | Geoff Linke | 38 |
| 1979 | 2 (Grand Finalist) | 14–8 | Haydn Bunton, Jr | G. Baynes | G. Baynes | Wayne Slattery | 61 |
| 1980 | 7 | 8–14 | Haydn Bunton, Jr | G. Baynes | S. Butler | Geoff Linke | 84 |
| 1981 | 4 | 15–7 | Haydn Bunton, Jr | G. Baynes | Robb Hawkins | Geoff Linke | 74 |
| 1982 | 8 | 8–14 | Haydn Bunton, Jr | S. Palmer | Robin White | C. Reynolds | 70 |
| 1983 | 5 | 12–10 | Graham Cornes | S. Palmer | Robb Hawkins | John Schneebichler | 65 |
| 1984 | 5 | 13–9 | Graham Cornes | S. Palmer | Mark Naley | Darren Harris | 57 |
| 1985 | 8 | 8–14 | Don Scott | John Schneebichler | David Kappler | Rick Davies | 72 |
| 1985 | 8 | 8–14 | Rick Davies | John Schneebichler | David Kappler | Rick Davies | 72 |
| 1986 | 9 | 7–14–1 | Rick Davies | John Schneebichler | Darren Troy | Rick Davies | 72 |
| 1987 | 10 (Wooden Spoon) | 5–17 | Rick Davies | John Schneebichler | David Kappler | David Stoeckel | 55 |
| 1988 | 10 (Wooden Spoon) | 1–21 | John Reid | Shane Butler | David Kappler | Steven Schmid | 38 |
| 1989 | 9 | 6–16 | John Reid | Shane Butler | Michael Whitford | David Stoeckel | 50 |
| 1990 | 4 | 9–11 | John Reid | Michael Bennett | Darren Trevena | David Stoeckel | 52 |
| 1991 | 3 | 16–6 | John Reid | Michael Bennett | David Kappler | Steven Schmid | 40 |
| 1992 | 5 | 11–11 | John Reid | Michael Bennett | MacGregor Grummet | Randall Bone | 35 |
| 1993 | 6 | 9–11 | John Reid | Darren Kappler | Martin Dillon | Peter McIntyre | 79 |
| 1994 | 7 | 9–13 | Ken Sheldon | Darren Trevena | Chris Wittman | Peter Keam | 35 |
| 1995 | 6 | 11–11 | Ken Sheldon | Darren Trevena | John Polkinghorne | Danny Del-Re | 92 |
| 1996 | 8 | 6–14 | K Sheldon | David Stoeckel | Andrew Osborn | David Stoeckel | 23 |
| 1996 | 8 | 6–14 | S Butler | David Stoeckel | Andrew Osborn | David Stoeckel | 23 |
| 1997 | 9 (Wooden Spoon) | 4–14–2 | Ken Applegarth | David Stoeckel | John Polkinghorne | Gary Cameron | 20 |
| 1998 | 7 | 9–11 | Ken Applegarth | Andrew Osborn | Dean Talbot | Ryan Fitzgerald | 40 |
| 1999 | 8 | 2–18 | Ken Applegarth | Andrew Osborn | Kym Cobb | David Hams | 43 |
| 2000 | 6 | 9–10–1 | Greg Anderson | Andrew Osborn | Dean Talbot | Mark Demasi | 39 |
| 2001 | 7 | 7–13 | Greg Anderson | Kym Koster | David Morgan | Clay Sampson | 28 |
| 2002 | 8 | 4–16 | Greg Anderson | Kym Koster | Clay Sampson | Mark Demasi | 25 |
| 2003 | 7 | 6–13–1 | Greg Anderson | Clay Sampson | Chris Hall | Rod Tregenza | 59 |
| 2004 | 8 | 7–13 | Robert Pyman | Clay Sampson | Clinton King | Rod Tregenza | 39 |
| 2005 | 7 | 7–13 | Robert Pyman | Clay Sampson | Michael Davis | Ben Warren | 60 |
| 2006 | 4 | 11–9 | Robert Pyman | Clay Sampson | Rhys Archard | Ben Warren | 64 |
| 2007 | 8 | 4–15–1 | Robert Pyman | Clay Sampson | Scott McGlone | Ben Warren | 27 |
| 2007 | 8 | 4–15–1 | Gary Cameron | Clay Sampson | Scott McGlone | Ben Warren | 27 |
| 2008 | 8 | 5–14–1 | John Cahill | Jason Torney | James Boyd | Ben Warren | 42 |
| 2008 | 8 | 5–14–1 | Clay Sampson | Jason Torney | James Boyd | Ben Warren | 42 |
| 2009 | 9 (Wooden Spoon) | 2–18 | Clay Sampson | Jason Torney | Mitch Sandery | Ben Warren | 48 |
| 2010 | 9 (Wooden Spoon) | 2–17–1 | Ron Fuller | Ben Warren | Nick Liddle | Ben Warren | 32 |
| 2011 | 4 | 8–11–1 | Ron Fuller | Nick Murphy | Joel Cross | Michael Wundke | 67 |
| 2012 | 8 | 7–13 | Ron Fuller | Nick Murphy | Nick Liddle | Michael Wundke | 55 |
| 2013 | 8 | 6–14 | Ron Fuller | Josh Thewlis | Nick Liddle | Michael Wundke | 52 |
| 2013 | 8 | 6–14 | Kym Cobb | Josh Thewlis | Nick Liddle | Michael Wundke | 52 |
| 2014 | 3 | 11–7 | Brad Gotch | Josh Thewlis | Keegan Brooksby | Brett Eddy | 67 |
| 2014 | 3 | 11–7 | Brad Gotch | Nick Murphy | Keegan Brooksby | Brett Eddy | 67 |
| 2015 | 6 | 9–8–1 | Brad Gotch | Brad Crabb | Joel Cross | Brett Eddy | 42 |
| 2016 | 4 | 14–4 | Brad Gotch | Brad Crabb | Joel Cross | Brett Eddy | 74 |
| 2016 | 4 | 14–4 | Brad Gotch | Brad Crabb | Brede Seccull | Brett Eddy | 74 |
| 2017 | 6 | 8–10 | Garry Hocking | Brad Crabb | Nick Liddle | Ben Haren | 23 |
| 2018 | 5 | 11–7 | Jarrad Wright | Joel Cross | Nick Liddle | Nathan Kreuger | 22 |
| 2018 | 5 | 11–7 | Jarrad Wright | Keegan Brooksby | Nick Liddle | Nathan Kreuger | 22 |
| 2019 | 6 | 9–7–2 | Jarrad Wright | Joel Cross | Joel Cross | Joel Cross | 26 |
| 2019 | 6 | 9–7–2 | Jarrad Wright | Matt Rose | Joel Cross | Joel Cross | 26 |
| 2020 | 3 | 9–5 | Jarrad Wright | Joel Cross | Matthew Broadbent | Sam Overall | 26 |
| 2020 | 3 | 9–5 | Jarrad Wright | Matt Rose | Matthew Broadbent | Sam Overall | 26 |
| 2021 | 3 | 10–8 | Jarrad Wright | Matt Rose | Bryce Gibbs | Liam Fitt | 30 |
| 2022 | 6 | 9–9 | Jarrad Wright | Matt Rose | Joseph Haines | Ryan Garthwaite | 22 |
| 2023 | 9 | 5–12–1 | Jarrad Wright | Jake Summerton | Keegan Brooksby | Zachary Sproule | 30 |
| 2024 | 9 | 4–14 | Jarrad Wright | Jake Summerton | Elliot Dunkin | Liam Fitt | 27 |
| 2024 | 9 | 4–14 | Jarrad Wright | Sam Skinner | Elliot Dunkin | Liam Fitt | 27 |
| 2025 | 8 | 4–14 | Jarrad Wright | Jake Summerton | Oliver Davis | Corey Grocock | 20 |
| 2025 | 8 | 4–14 | Jarrad Wright | Sam Skinner | Oliver Davis | Corey Grocock | 20 |
| 2026 | 6 | 8–10 | Jarrad Wright | Oscar Clavarino | Oliver Davis | Jack Delean | 46 |
| 2026 | 6 | 8–10 | Jack Maher | Oscar Clavarino | Oliver Davis | Jack Delean | 46 |

== Players ==
=== Notable players and coaches ===
Source: Australian Football - South Adelaide Football Club - Stats

| A: | Wally Allen | Len 'Buck' Ashby | | | |
| B: | Lindsay Backman | Frank 'Dinky' Barry | Andy Bennett | Mark Bickley | Randall Bone |
| B: | Dean Brogan | Keegan Brooksby | Keith Brown | Alf Bushby | William Bushby |
| C: | Laurie Cahill | Alipate Carlile | Arnold Caust | Gary Christie | Matthew Clarke |
| C: | Craig Cock | Jack Cockburn | Mark Coombe | Graham Cornes | Damian Cupido |
| D: | Anthony 'Bos' Daly | 'Jack' Daly | Caleb Daniel | David Darcy | Luke Darcy |
| D: | Peter Darley | Alwyn Davey | Rick Davies | James 'Jim' Dawes | John 'Jack' Dawes |
| D: | Ian Day | Jim Deane | Danny Del-Re | Michael Doughty | Stephen Doyle |
| E: | Brett Eddy | | | | |
| F: | Ashley Fernee | Tom Fields | Ryan "Fitzy" Fitzgerald | Eddie Fry | |
| G: | Simon Goodwin | Nikki Gore | Jack Graham | Ryan Griffen | Chris Groom |
| H: | Jim Handby | Michael Handby | Frank Hansen | John 'Jack' Hansen | Keith 'Barney' Haussen |
| H: | Robb Hawkins | Glynn Hewitt | Alan Hickinbotham | Clem Hill | H. Hill |
| H: | Jason Horne-Francis | | | | |
| J: | Dick Jackson | Stan Jaffer | Vic Johnson | Ernie Jones | John Judd |
| K: | David Kantilla | Darren Kappler | Barry Karklis | Jack Kay | Bob Keddie |
| K: | Neil Kerley | Ron Kitchen | Kym Koster | | |
| L: | Brendon Lade | Len Lapthorne | Ray Linke | | |
| M: | George Margitich | Ron McGowan | Cory McGrath | Bruce McGregor | Peter McIntyre |
| M: | Dan Moriarty | George Mulcahy | Max Murdy | Chris Munro | Beau McCreery |
| N: | Mark Naley | | | | |
| O: | Bill Oliver | Andrew Osborn | | | |
| P: | Stuart Palmer | Des Panizza | Denis Parham | Bryan Ploenges | Ian Prendergast |
| P: | Don Pryor | | | | |
| R: | Jack 'Dinny' Reedman | Brian Roberts | Matthew Rogers | Lester Ross | Alfred 'Bulla' Ryan |
| S: | Clay Sampson | Joe Scanlon | Bob Schmidt | John Schneebichler | S. Scott |
| S: | Alf Skuse | Nigel Smart | Frank Spiel | Chris Stasinowsky | |
| T: | Jim Templeton | James Tierney | Jason Torney | Jack Tredrea | Frank Tully |
| V: | Nathan van Berlo | Lyndon Valente | John Vickers | | |
| W: | George Wallace | H. Wardrop | Alan White | Robin White | Malcolm Whitford |

== See also ==
- Category:South Adelaide Football Club players
- Category:South Adelaide Football Club coaches
