= 1911 SAFL season =

1911 season of SANFL

1911 SAFL premiership season
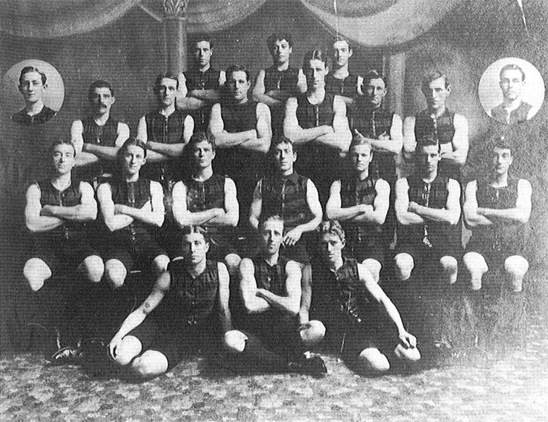
- 35th season Pictured above is the 1911 West Adelaide premiership team.
- Teams: 7
- Premiers: West Adelaide; 3rd premiership
- Minor premiers: Port Adelaide; 8th minor premiership
- Magarey Medallist: Harold Cumberland; Sturt
- Leading goalkicker: Frank Hansen; Port Adelaide (41 goals)
- Matches played: 46
- Highest: 24,500 (26 June, West Adelaide vs. Port Adelaide)

The 1911 South Australian Football League season was the 35th season of the top-level Australian rules football competition in South Australia. The season was dominated by Port Adelaide and West Adelaide, who lost only one game to any of the other five clubs – and that came when West Adelaide was affected by injuries to key players late in the season. The dominance of the top two was strengthened by the decline of Norwood, who missed the top four for only the second time since district football began; for Norwood, it was the beginning of the bleakest era of its entire history, not returning to the major round until 1920. Sturt also failed to maintain its 1910 form, being affected by the defections of star players Phil Matson and Herbert Limb to the WAFL, and of Jack Londrigan to Port Adelaide via University.

== Minor round ==
=== Round 1 ===
	Round 1
Saturday, 6 May 1911	South Adelaide 4.6 (30)	def. by	North Adelaide 7.20 (62)	Adelaide Oval
Saturday, 6 May 1911	Sturt 4.9 (33)	def. by	West Adelaide 7.13 (55)	Unley Oval
Monday, 8 May 1911	Port Adelaide 16.20 (116)	def.	West Torrens 12.4 (76)	Alberton Oval
	Bye; Norwood

=== Round 2 ===
	Round 2
Saturday, 13 May 1911	West Adelaide 5.11 (41)	def.	Norwood 4.4 (28)	Adelaide Oval
Saturday, 13 May 1911	Port Adelaide 16.11 (107)	def.	North Adelaide 5.4 (34)	Alberton Oval
Saturday, 13 May 1911	Sturt 3.13 (31)	def.	South Adelaide 3.10 (28)	Unley Oval
	Bye; West Torrens

=== Round 3 ===
	Round 3
Saturday, 20 May 1911	South Adelaide 5.2 (32)	def. by	Port Adelaide 7.16 (58)	Adelaide Oval
Saturday, 20 May 1911	West Torrens 6.7 (43)	def. by	West Adelaide 7.10 (52)	Hindmarsh Oval
Saturday, 20 May 1911	Norwood 2.7 (19)	def. by	Sturt 6.9 (45)	Norwood Oval
	Bye; North Adelaide

=== Round 4 ===
	Round 4
Saturday, 27 May 1911	South Adelaide 5.5 (35)	def. by	West Adelaide 7.16 (58)	Adelaide Oval
Saturday, 27 May 1911	West Torrens 5.9 (39)	def. by	North Adelaide 4.18 (42)	Hindmarsh Oval
Saturday, 27 May 1911	Norwood 3.13 (31)	def. by	Port Adelaide 8.14 (62)	Norwood Oval
	Bye; Sturt

=== Round 5 ===
	Round 5
Saturday, 3 June 1911	North Adelaide 8.12 (60)	def.	Norwood 5.8 (38)	Adelaide Oval
Monday, 5 June 1911	Port Adelaide 10.12 (72)	def.	Sturt 3.8 (26)	Adelaide Oval
Monday, 5 June 1911	West Torrens 6.16 (52)	def.	South Adelaide 5.9 (39)	Hindmarsh Oval
	Bye; West Adelaide

=== Round 6 ===
	Round 6
Saturday, 17 June 1911	North Adelaide 4.9 (33)	def. by	West Adelaide 5.14 (44)	Adelaide Oval
Saturday, 17 June 1911	Norwood 10.14 (74)	def.	South Adelaide 8.10 (58)	Norwood Oval
Saturday, 17 June 1911	Sturt 5.7 (37)	def.	West Torrens 2.10 (22)	Unley Oval
	Bye; Port Adelaide

=== Round 7 ===
	Round 7
Saturday, 24 June 1911	North Adelaide 6.15 (51)	def.	Sturt 3.7 (25)	Adelaide Oval
Monday, 26 June 1911	West Adelaide 8.19 (67)	def.	Port Adelaide 3.5 (23)	Adelaide Oval (crowd: 24,500)
Monday, 26 June 1911	Norwood 9.15 (69)	def.	West Torrens 4.9 (33)	Norwood Oval
	Bye; South Adelaide

=== Round 8 ===
	Round 8
Saturday, 1 July 1911	West Adelaide 10.17 (77)	def.	Sturt 4.10 (34)	Adelaide Oval
Saturday, 1 July 1911	West Torrens 7.12 (54)	def. by	Port Adelaide 14.20 (104)	Hindmarsh Oval
Saturday, 1 July 1911	North Adelaide 12.11 (83)	def.	South Adelaide 9.13 (67)	Jubilee Oval
	Bye; Norwood

=== Round 9 ===
	Round 9
Saturday, 15 July 1911	Port Adelaide 13.12 (90)	def.	South Adelaide 7.6 (48)	Alberton Oval
Saturday, 15 July 1911	West Adelaide 13.10 (88)	def.	West Torrens 8.6 (54)	Jubilee Oval
Saturday, 15 July 1911	Sturt 6.11 (47)	def.	Norwood 3.11 (29)	Unley Oval
	Bye; North Adelaide

=== Round 10 ===
	Round 10
Saturday, 22 July 1911	North Adelaide 6.8 (44)	def.	West Torrens 4.12 (36)	Adelaide Oval
Saturday, 22 July 1911	Port Adelaide 16.21 (117)	def.	Norwood 6.4 (40)	Alberton Oval
Saturday, 22 July 1911	West Adelaide 9.11 (65)	def.	South Adelaide 6.11 (47)	Jubilee Oval
	Bye; Sturt

=== Round 11 ===
	Round 11
Saturday, 19 August 1911	South Adelaide 8.9 (57)	def.	West Torrens 8.8 (56)	Adelaide Oval
Saturday, 19 August 1911	Norwood 6.15 (51)	def.	North Adelaide 5.12 (42)	Norwood Oval
Saturday, 19 August 1911	Sturt 9.11 (65)	def. by	Port Adelaide 8.18 (66)	Unley Oval
	Bye; West Adelaide
South's thrilling win over West Torrens was only its second victory in thirty-eight matches going back to late 1908.

=== Round 12 ===
	Round 12
Saturday, 26 August 1911	South Adelaide 7.4 (46)	def. by	Norwood 7.19 (61)	Adelaide Oval
Saturday, 26 August 1911	West Torrens 5.10 (40)	def. by	Sturt 8.10 (58)	Hindmarsh Oval
Saturday, 26 August 1911	West Adelaide 10.12 (72)	def.	North Adelaide 5.8 (38)	Jubilee Oval
	Bye; Port Adelaide

=== Round 13 ===
	Round 13
Saturday, 2 September 1911	Port Adelaide 11.17 (83)	def.	West Adelaide 5.8 (38)	Alberton Oval
Saturday, 2 September 1911	West Torrens 5.9 (39)	def. by	Norwood 5.10 (40)	Hindmarsh Oval
Saturday, 2 September 1911	Sturt 3.4 (22)	def. by	North Adelaide 7.2 (44)	Unley Oval
	Bye; South Adelaide
West Adelaide's loss ended a ten match winning streak, which as of 2026 remains a club record.

=== Round 14 ===
	Round 14
Saturday, 9 September 1911	North Adelaide 6.5 (41)	def. by	Port Adelaide 6.10 (46)	Adelaide Oval
Saturday, 9 September 1911	South Adelaide 5.10 (40)	def. by	Sturt 9.7 (61)	Jubilee Oval
Saturday, 9 September 1911	Norwood 10.10 (70)	def.	West Adelaide 6.7 (43)	Norwood Oval
	Bye; West Torrens

== Ladder ==
1911 SAFL Ladder
Pos	Team	Pld	W	L	D	PF	PA	PP	Pts
1	Port Adelaide	12	11	1	0	944	552	63.10	22
2	West Adelaide (P)	12	10	2	0	700	521	57.33	20
3	North Adelaide	12	7	5	0	574	577	49.87	14
4	Sturt	12	6	6	0	484	543	47.13	12
5	Norwood	12	6	6	0	550	633	46.49	12
6	West Torrens	12	1	11	0	544	746	42.17	2
7	South Adelaide	12	1	11	0	527	751	41.24	2

Rules for classification: 1) points; 2) percentage; 3) number of points for.
(P) Premiers

== Major round ==
=== First semi-final ===
1911 SAFL first semi-final
Saturday, 23 September	West Adelaide	def.	Sturt	Adelaide Oval (crowd: 12,000)
1.5 (11); 5.5 (35); 6.7 (43); 8.11 (59)	Q1; Q2; Q3; Final	3.1 (19); 3.2 (20); 6.2 (38); 6.2 (38)	Umpires: Ottey
Lane 3, Dowling, Slattery, Bats, Dailey, Pierce	Goals	Molle 2, Banningan 2, Osborn, Cumberland
Dowling, Hele, Baker, Mills, Stearnes, Slattery	Best	Renfrey, Cumberland, Dunne, Bannigan, Wickens, Hewitt

=== Second semi-final ===
1911 SAFL second semi-final
Saturday, 23 September	Port Adelaide	def.	North Adelaide	Adelaide Oval (crowd: 14,000)
5.4 (34); 7.7 (49); 9.10 (64); 10.11 (71)	Q1; Q2; Q3; Final	1.2 (8); 3.5 (23); 4.7 (31); 6.9 (45)	Umpires: McKenzie
Hansen 3, Congear 2, McFarlane 2, O'Grady, Meadows, Oliver	Goals	Johns 3, Kirkpatrick, Tierney
Pope, Meadows. Cocks, McEwen, Hansen, O'Grady, Congear, Cullinan	Best	Wilson, R. Leahy, Trescowthick, Le Messurier, Klose, Kirkpatrick

=== Final ===
1911 SAFL Final
Saturday, 30 September	Port Adelaide	def. by	West Adelaide	Adelaide Oval (crowd: 20,000)
1.3 (9); 2.5 (17); 4.6 (30); 4.11 (35)	Q1; Q2; Q3; Final	1.2 (8); 5.2 (32); 7.7 (49); 7.11 (53)	Umpires: Aldersey
Hansen 2, Congear, Dickson	Goals	Dowling 2, Moore 2, Mills, Alec Conlin, Bates
O'Grady, Oliver, McFarlane, Dewar, Knapman, Callinan	Best	Dowling (best on ground), Oakley, Alec Conlin, Arthur Conlin, Stearnes, Moore, a'Court

=== Grand final ===
1911 SAFL Grand Final
Saturday, 7 October	Port Adelaide	def. by	West Adelaide	Adelaide Oval (crowd: 19,000)
2.2 (14); 4.3 (27); 4.9 (33); 6.10 (46)	Q1; Q2; Q3; Final	3.4 (22); 4.6 (30); 5.8 (38); 7.9 (51)	Umpires: Aldersey
Hosking 3, Hansen 2, Congear	Goals	Dowling 2, Alec Conlin 2, Hele, Pierce, Dailey
Oliver (best on ground), Magor, Hosking, Dempster, Congear, O'Grady, Dewar	Best	Moore, Slattery, Dowling, Hele, O'Grady, Moy

== Championship of Australia ==
1911 Championship of Australia
Wednesday, 11 October	West Adelaide	def.	Essendon	Adelaide Oval
1.1 (7); 3.6 (24); 6.6 (42); 8.9 (57)	Q1; Q2; Q3; Final	2.3 (15); 3.5 (23); 5.10 (40); 7.12 (54)	Umpires: Aldersey
Alec Conlin 3, Mills 2, Moy, Slttery, Dowling	Goals	L. Armstrong 3, A. Armstrong 2, Benstead, Walker
Stearnes, J.F. McCarthy, a'Court, Oakley, Alec Conlin, Hele	Best	Sewat, Chalmeers, L. Armstrong, Shea, Griffiths, Baring
Despite playing several injured players, West Adelaide took advantage of lapses by Essendon's defence in the last quarter to win a close match.
