= David Darcy =

Australian rules footballer and coach (1943–2020)

Personal information
- Full name: David Darcy
- Born: 11 August 1943
- Died: 1 August 2020 (aged 76)
- Original team: Sunshine YCW (CYMSFA)
- Height: 188 cm (6 ft 2 in)
- Weight: 83 kg (183 lb)
- Position: Key position defender

Playing career^{1}
Years	Club	Games (Goals)
1963–1966, 1968–1971	Footscray	133 (47)
1967, 1972–1973	South Adelaide	44

Coaching career
Years	Club	Games (W–L–D)
1972–1974	South Adelaide	64 (16–48–0)
- ^{1} Playing statistics correct to the end of 1971.

David Darcy (11 August 1943 – 1 August 2020) was an Australian rules footballer who played for Footscray in the Victorian Football League (VFL) during the 1960s. Darcy also played for and coached South Adelaide in the South Australian National Football League (SANFL).

== Career ==
Darcy was recruited from Sunshine YCW, a junior club in the CYMS Football Association (CYMSFA). David initially spent four seasons at Footscray from 1963 to 1966, before a work transfer sent him to Adelaide in October 1966.

He started his career at half forward but in his second season moved to defence where he excelled. As a key position defender he went on to represent Victoria on four occasions.

Upon moving to South Australia Darcy chose to play with South Adelaide but Footscray initially refused to clear him, while Darcy himself refused to fly to Melbourne to continue with Footscray. Once the clearance came through in June, he had an outstanding year with the Panthers whereby he would finish third in the Magarey Medal from only 11 games.

Darcy transferred back to Melbourne in 1968 and returned to Footscray until 1971.

On his return to the Panthers he was selected as captain-coach for the 1972 and 1973 seasons, and became non-playing coach for 1974.

Darcy was the father of former Western Bulldogs player and current football commentator Luke Darcy and the grandfather of current Western Bulldogs player Sam Darcy.
