= Nikki Nield =

Australian rules footballer (born 2000)

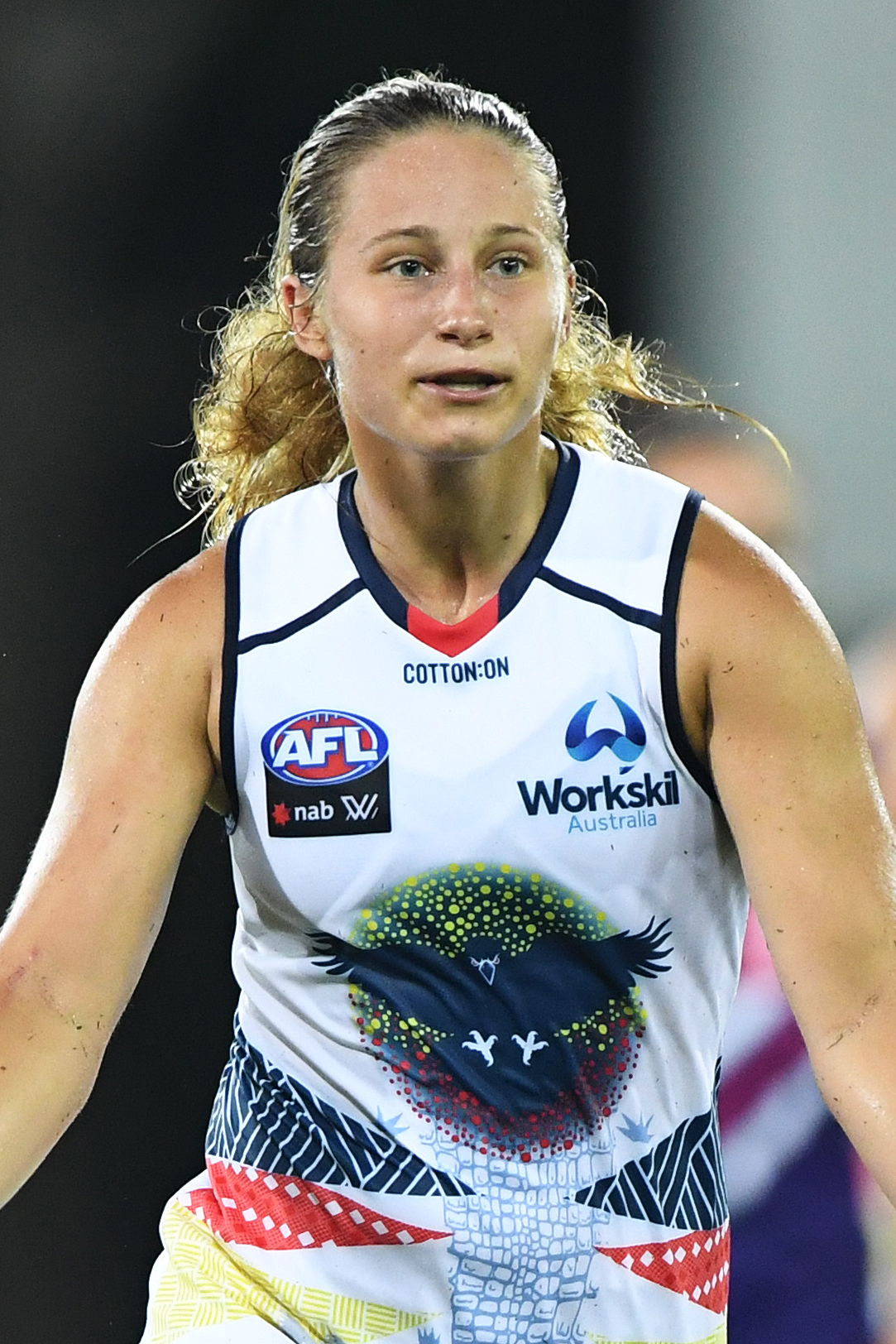
- Nikki Nield playing for Adelaide in 2019

Personal information
- Nickname: Turbo
- Born: 11 December 2000 (age 25); Adelaide, South Australia
- Original teams: Christies Beach (AdelFL) South Adelaide (SANFLW)
- Draft: No. 8, 2018 AFL Women's draft
- Debut: Round 6, 2019, Adelaide vs. Greater Western Sydney, at Peter Motley Oval
- Height: 164 cm (5 ft 5 in)
- Position: Midfielder

Club information
- Current club: Fremantle

Playing career^{1}
Years	Club	Games (Goals)
2019–2022 (S6)	Adelaide	21 (2)
2022 (S7)–2023 (S8)	Fremantle	9 (1)
Total		30 (3)
- ^{1} Playing statistics correct to the end of the 2023 season.

Career highlights
- AFL Women's premiership player: 2022 (S6); AdelFL Division 2 premiership player (Christies Beach): 2017; 2× SANFLW premiership player (South Adelaide): 2018, 2019; SANFLW Breakthrough Player Award: 2018; South Adelaide best and fairest: 2018; SANFLW Best and Fairest: 2024

Nikki Nield (née Gore, born 11 December 2000) is a former Australian rules footballer who played for both Adelaide and Fremantle in the AFL Women's (AFLW) competition. Nield made 30 appearances in the AFLW, before returning to state league football.

== State football ==
Nield played Australian rules football since the age of 11, first at McLaren and then joined Christies Beach She captained Christies Beach under-14 boys' team in 2014 and in 2016 joined their senior South Australian Women's Football League (SAWFL) side, helping them claim the Adelaide Footy League Division 2 premiership in 2017. In 2018, Nield joined SANFL Women's League (SANFLW) club South Adelaide. She had a very successful first season, averaging 19.5 disposals over eight games, as well as collecting 21 disposals and laying eight tackles in the Grand Final victory over Norwood. In round 4, after collecting 20 disposals, she was nominated for the Breakthrough Player Award, winning the award at the end of the season. Furthermore, she was selected for the 2018 SANFLW Team of the Year and won South Adelaide's best and fairest award. Nield represented South Australia at the 2018 AFL Women's Under 18 Championships and was selected for the initial squad of the All-Australian team. In 2019, Gore averaged 18 disposals over seven games, laying 48 tackles during the SANFLW season, helping South Adelaide claim back-to-back premierships. Gore also played two games for NT Thunder during the 2018 VFL Women's (VFLW) season.

In 2024, Nield won the SANFL Women's League Best and Fairest Award with 27 votes, with South Adelaide qualifying for another Grand Final.

== AFL Women's career ==
Nield was drafted by Adelaide with their first selection and eighth overall in the 2018 AFL Women's draft. Adelaide's general manager of football, Phil Harper, said that she "is a real competitor who loves the contest, tackles hard, and has an enormous work rate." She made her debut in the 32 point win over Greater Western Sydney at Peter Motley Oval in round 6 of the 2019 season.

In June 2022, Nield was traded to Fremantle.

After the 2023 AFLW season, Nield was told by Fremantle that she would not receive a new contract, therefore finishing her AFLW career.

== Personal life ==
Nield was born in Christies Beach in Adelaide. She has a twin sister, named Amy, who is a surfer. Both twins had started out surfing, but Gore changed to football due to not enjoying the individual aspect of surfing. Both twins studied at Tatachilla Lutheran College until year nine, when they took up online schooling.

Nield now teaches at a high school in the Morphett Vale area, where she has taught since 2024.
