= Lapthorn =

Lapthorn is a surname. Notable people with the surname include:

- Enid Lapthorn (1889–1967), British politician
- Katherine Lapthorn, Dutch member of Kayak (band)

== See also ==
- Ratsey and Lapthorn, British company of sail making
- Lapthorne
