= Darren Troy =

Australian rules footballer

Personal information
- Born: 28 February 1964 (age 62)
- Original team: Kerang (NDFL)
- Height: 180 cm (5 ft 11 in)
- Weight: 87 kg (192 lb)

Playing career^{1}
| Years | Club | Games (Goals) |
| 1983–1990 | Geelong | 46 (6) |
| 1985–1986, 1991-1992 | South Adelaide | 74 (40) |
- ^{1} Playing statistics correct to the end of 1990.

Darren Troy (born 28 February 1964) is a former Australian rules footballer who played with Geelong in the Victorian/Australian Football League (VFL/AFL).

Troy, a utility, came to Geelong from Kerang. An Under-19s player initially, he broke into the seniors for the first time in the final round of the 1983 VFL season, against Hawthorn at Kardinia Park.

After not making a VFL appearance in 1984, Troy left Geelong for South Adelaide, where he played in 1985 and 1986. He won their best and fairest award in 1986.

In 1987, Troy returned to Geelong and this time was able to establish a place in the team, with 18 games that year. He made another 15 appearances in 1988, then six in 1989 and another six in 1990.

Troy went back to South Adelaide in 1991. He captain-coached Geelong Football League side Leopold in 1993 and 1994. From 1995 to 1997, Troy was captain of Newtown & Chilwell, in the same league.
