= Jack Tredrea =

Australian rules footballer

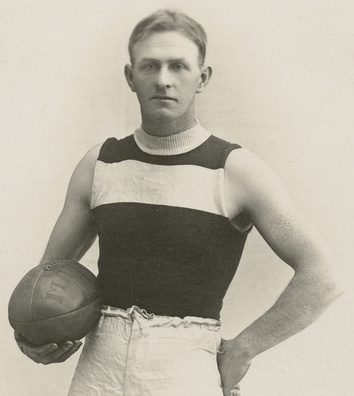

Personal information
- Full name: John James Tredrea
- Nickname: Jack
- Born: 17 December 1884
- Died: 8 October 1975 (aged 90); Adelaide
- Position: Utility

Playing career
Years	Club	Games (Goals)
1903–15, 1919–22	South Adelaide	220 (53)

Representative team honours
Years	Team	Games (Goals)
	South Australia	29

Career highlights
- South Adelaide life membership (1912); South Adelaide greatest team (ruck-rover)

John J. Tredrea (1884 to 1975) was an Australian rules footballer who played for the South Adelaide in the South Australian Football League. He served as the captain of South Adelaide from 1911 to 1915. He was the first South Australian player to reach 200 league games.
