= 1898 SAFA Grand Final =

South Adelaide	Port Adelaide
8.8 (56)	4.8 (32)
	1	2	3	4
STH	4.3 (27)	8.5 (55)	8.5 (55)	8.8 (56)
PTA	0.1 (1)	1.3 (9)	3.6 (24)	4.8 (32)
- Date: Saturday 10 September (2:10 pm)
- Stadium: Adelaide Oval
- Attendance: 6,500
- Umpires: Mr Ford

The 1898 SAFA Grand Final was the concluding championship match of the 1898 SAFA season. The game resulted in a victory for South Adelaide who beat Port Adelaide by 24 points.
