= Andrew Osborn =

Australian rules footballer

Personal information
- Born: 10 October 1972 (age 54)
- Original team: Reynella (SFL)

Playing career^{1}
Years	Club	Games (Goals)
1992–2000	South Adelaide	115 (93)
- ^{1} Playing statistics correct to the end of 2008.

Career highlights
- Magarey Medal - 1998

Andrew Osborn (born 10 October 1972) is a former Australian rules footballer who played with South Adelaide in the South Australian National Football League (SANFL).

After beginning his football with Southern Football League club Reynella, Andrew won the trophy for the Most Consistent Player in 1988. Then, in the following year, he won the W.J. Mahoney Cup for the best and fairest in South Adelaide's U17's, and the McCallum Medal for best and fairest in the SANFL U17 competition.

Progressing through the grades, Andrew was instrumental in South Adelaide's win in the 1991 Reserves Grand Final and his football prowess naturally attracted the interest of two AFL clubs (Geelong in 1993 and Port Adelaide in 1998 (Zone Selection)). However, Andrew was kept from performing on that stage by long-term injuries, especially to his back. The self-discipline, dedication and perseverance which he showed to overcome these difficulties and to reach the pinnacle of the SANFL competition were qualities that had long been recognised as an integral part of his game.

Andrew was a great team-man, and his appointment as South Adelaide captain from 1998 to 2000 recognised his skills as a leader and the respect in which he was held by his fellow team-mates and the club as a whole. In 1998, his victory in the Magarey Medal, and his selection in the state side, were clear indications that this same respect was afforded him by the wider South Australian community.

When he retired from league football at the end of 2000, Osborn had played 115 games and kicked 93 goals for the Panthers.

In late 2007 Andrew returned to his beloved Panthers in an off-field role, becoming the club's Marketing Manager.
