= Alan Hickinbotham =

Australian rules football player and coach (1925-2010)

Personal information
- Full name: Alan David Hickinbotham, AM
- Born: 9 December 1925; Geelong, Victoria
- Died: 25 May 2010 (aged 84); Adelaide, South Australia
- Original team: South Adelaide
- Height: 6 ft 0 in (183 cm)
- Weight: 13 st 5 lb (85 kg)

Playing career^{1}
Years	Club	Games (Goals)
1949–1951	Geelong	6 (0)

Representative team honours
Years	Team	Games (Goals)
	South Australia	4
- ^{1} Playing statistics correct to the end of 1951.

Alan David Hickinbotham AM (9 December 1925 – 25 May 2010) was an Australian businessman and Australian rules football player and coach.

== Biography ==
Hickinbotham was born on 9 December 1925 in Geelong, Victoria. During 1944 and 1945 he served in the Royal Australian Air Force as a gunner.

In 1948 he graduated from the University of Adelaide with a Bachelor of Science and Diploma of Education. From 1949 to 1951 he taught science and mathematics at Geelong Grammar.

Hickinbotham founded the Hickinbotham Group of Companies in 1954, which became one of Australia's largest building companies, developing over 50 community estates in Adelaide. He was an influential member of the Housing Industry Association SA and worked to sponsor skilled migrants from Britain to settle in Adelaide. He also had an interest in wineries in South Australia.

He was appointed a Member of the Order of Australia for "services to housing and urban development" in 1998. A scholarship at St Columba College in Adelaide is named in honour.

=== Football ===
Before his business career, Hickinbotham played with South Adelaide Football Club and won their best and fairest award in 1947, before playing six matches as a key defender for Geelong Football Club. He later captain-coached South Adelaide Football Club in 1954 and was club president between 1965 and 1982. He retained ties with the club until his death.

Hickinbotham was captain-coach of Irymple Football Club in the Sunraysia Football League in 1952 (runners up) and 1953 (3rd), before returning to Adelaide.

In 2005 South Adelaide renamed their home ground Hickinbotham Oval, (formerly Noarlunga Oval), in his honour. He played four representative games for South Australia.

In the early 1970s, Hickinbotham was part of a committee that drove the development of Football Park, a dedicated Australian rules football ground for major matches in Adelaide.

=== Politics ===
He unsuccessfully stood as a Liberal Party candidate for the Division of Hawker in the 1969 Federal election.

== Death ==
Hickinbotham died in May 2010 after a long illness, aged 84.
