= John Schneebichler =

Australian rules footballer (1958–2020)

Personal information
- Full name: John Schneebichler
- Born: 23 July 1958
- Died: 9 March 2020 (aged 61)

Playing career^{1}
Years	Club	Games (Goals)
1975-1987	South Adelaide (SANFL)	234 (351)
1988	Glenelg (SANFL)	25 (26)
Total		259 (377)

Representative team honours
Years	Team	Games (Goals)
	South Australia	5
- ^{1} Playing statistics correct to the end of 1988.

Career highlights
- South Adelaide Captain 1985–1987; South Adelaide Leading Goalkicker 1983 (65); South Adelaide Hall of Fame

John Schneebichler (23 July 1958 – 9 March 2020) was an Australian rules footballer who played for South Adelaide and Glenelg in the South Australian National Football League (SANFL).
