= Robin White (footballer) =

Australian rules footballer

Personal information
- Full name: Robin White
- Born: 8 September 1960 (age 66)
- Original team: South Adelaide (SANFL)
- Height: 177 cm (5 ft 10 in)
- Weight: 80 kg (176 lb)
- Position: Defence

Playing career^{1}
Years	Club	Games (Goals)
1985–87	Melbourne	30 (2)
- ^{1} Playing statistics correct to the end of 1987.

Robin White (born 8 September 1960) is a former Australian rules footballer who played with Melbourne in the Victorian Football League (VFL) and South Adelaide in the South Australian National Football League (SANFL).

A Best and Fairest winner at South Adelaide in 1982 who also represented South Australia, White was recruited by Melbourne and made his senior VFL debut in 1985.

Following the end of his VFL career, White moved to Victorian Football Association (VFA) club Prahran in 1988, where he played 13 matches, kicking one goal, until his retirement in 1990.
