= Bob Schmidt (Australian footballer) =

Australian rules footballer (1943–2020)

Robert 'Bob' Dennis Schmidt (22 January 1943 – 4 November 2020) was an Australian rules footballer.

Born in Adelaide, Schmidt played 162 games with the South Adelaide Foodball Cup and was awarded the 1965 Knuckey Cup, Hall of Fame, Best Team Ever, and State Representative on 11 occasions. Schmidt also won two Mail Medals.

Schmidt played Australian rules football as a boy, he was in the Black Forest Primary school team in grade Four, captaining in grade Seven. He played at Unley High School for five years and then moved to the Glandore Football Club under future South Adelaide team mate Tony Shaw. He continued his playing career when he entered teachers' college and then joined the South Adelaide Football Club. In 1964 Schmidt played half back in the grand final between South Adelaide and Port Adelaide. This was the first grand final won by South Adelaide since 1938 and they have not won another one since. He finished playing league football in mid-1971. In the late 1970s he joined the Onkaparinga Valley Football Club where he was playing coach for four years.

Schmidt was also a sailor and was a runner-up in the 1964 state titles and sailed in the Australian titles. He also did a great deal of kayaking including competing in several Murray Marathons (each 100 km long). Schmidt had a career in teaching including at Mount Barker High School and Ingle Farm High School. He was the dean of studies at Adelaide University Senior School before he retired in January 2010. His wife Inger was the head of the International School at the University of Adelaide at the same time. He also had a few breaks from teaching and undertook a diverse variety of career diversions including as a piggery farmhand, insurance salesman and author. He was commissioned to write a book on the history of Mount Barker called Mountain Upon the Plain.
