= Laurie Cahill =

Australian rules footballer and coach

Personal information
- Full name: Lawrence William Denmon Cahill
- Born: 22 September 1912; Quorn, South Australia
- Died: 6 December 1974 (aged 62); Adelaide, South Australia
- Height: 5 ft 7 in (171 cm)
- Weight: 11 st 9 lb (74 kg)
- Positions: Rover, Wingman

Playing career^{1}
Years	Club	Games (Goals)
1933–42, 1944–47	South Adelaide	187
1943	Richmond	7 (4)

Coaching career
Years	Club	Games (W–L–D)
1947–48	South Adelaide	34 (2–32–0)
1954–56	West Adelaide	59 (34–24–1)
1957	South Adelaide	18 (2–16–0)
Total		111 (38–72–1)
- ^{1} Playing statistics correct to the end of 1947.

Lawrence William Denmon Cahill (22 September 1912 – 6 December 1974) was an Australian rules footballer who played for South Adelaide in the South Australian National Football League (SANFL) and Richmond in the Victorian Football League (VFL).

== Career ==
Cahill, the uncle of coaching great John, played as both a rover and wingman during his career. A premiership player in 1935 and 1938, he won South Adelaide's 'best and fairest' in the second of those years as well as in 1939.

While in Melbourne in 1943, Cahill made seven appearances for Richmond. He was the team's top goal-kicker in the Preliminary Final win over Fitzroy, with three goals and also participated in their premiership a week later.

He continued playing for four years after returning to South Adelaide and then coached the club in 1947 and 1948, as well as another stint later in 1957. In between, from 1953 to 1956, Cahill was in charge of West Adelaide and coached them to a couple of Grand Final losses.

A South Australian representative at the 1937 Perth Carnival, Cahill played a total of 11 interstate matches over the years. He is a wingman in South Adelaide's official 'Greatest Team'.
