= Kym Koster =

Australian rules footballer, born 1973

Personal information
- Full name: Kym Koster
- Born: 1 February 1973 (age 53)
- Original team: South Adelaide
- Height: 182 cm (6 ft 0 in)
- Weight: 79 kg (174 lb)

Playing career^{1}
Years	Club	Games (Goals)
1994–1995	Footscray	38 (13)
1996–2000	Adelaide	95 (31)
Total		133 (44)
- ^{1} Playing statistics correct to the end of 2000.

Career highlights
- 2× AFL premiership player (1997, 1998)

Kym Koster (born 1 February 1973) is a former Australian rules footballer who played 133 games in the Australian Football League, kicking 44 goals.

Recruited from South Australian National Football League side South Adelaide, Koster made his AFL debut for Footscray in 1994, playing 38 games and kicking 13 goals. He transferred to Adelaide in 1996 where he played a further 95 games and kicked 31 goals until 2000. Koster was a member of the 1997 and 1998 Adelaide Premiership teams.

== Playing statistics ==
Legend
G	Goals	K	Kicks	D	Disposals	T	Tackles
B	Behinds	H	Handballs	M	Marks

Season	Team	No.	Games	Totals							Averages (per game)						
Season	Team	No.	Games	G	B	K	H	D	M	T	G	B	K	H	D	M	T
1994	Footscray	12	23	10	6	156	110	266	53	42	0.4	0.3	6.8	4.8	11.6	2.3	1.8
1995	Footscray	12	15	3	4	121	87	208	32	26	0.2	0.3	8.1	5.8	13.9	2.1	1.7
1996	Adelaide	9	9	4	6	92	62	154	39	18	0.4	0.7	10.2	6.9	17.1	4.3	2.0
1997	Adelaide	5	24	12	8	240	110	350	81	51	0.5	0.3	10.0	4.6	14.6	3.4	2.1
1998	Adelaide	5	26	7	11	255	158	413	63	54	0.3	0.4	9.8	6.1	15.9	2.4	2.1
1999	Adelaide	5	20	6	6	177	115	292	43	44	0.3	0.3	8.9	5.8	14.6	2.2	2.2
2000	Adelaide	5	16	2	3	95	93	188	25	18	0.1	0.2	5.9	5.8	11.8	1.6	1.1
Career			133	44	44	1136	735	1871	336	253	0.3	0.3	8.5	5.5	14.1	2.5	1.9
