= Jim Deane =

Australian rules footballer and coach

Personal information
- Full name: James Grant Deane
- Born: 2 January 1928; Rose Park, South Australia
- Died: 14 November 2010 (aged 82); Balaklava, South Australia
- Original team: South Adelaide
- Height: 5 ft 11 in (180 cm)
- Weight: 12 st 11 lb (81 kg)

Playing career^{1}
Years	Club	Games (Goals)
1945-1953	South Adelaide	
1954-1955	Richmond	33 (17)
1956-1957	South Adelaide	157 (95)
1958-1962	Myrtleford	78

Representative team honours
Years	Team	Games (Goals)
	South Australia	15 (12)

Coaching career
Years	Club	Games (W–L–D)
1951-1953, 1970-1971	South Adelaide	94 (20–74–0)
- ^{1} Playing statistics correct to the end of 1955.

Career highlights
- Captain of South Adelaide, 1951, 1952, 1953, 1956, 1957; Magarey Medallist 1953, 1957 (runner up in 1949, 1950, 1951); Six time best and fairest for South Adelaide, 1948, 1949, 1951, 1953, 1956, 1957; SANFL U/19 - Tomkins Medallist 1945; Life member of South Adelaide 1956; Ovens & Murray Football League - Morris Medal 1958 & 1961; Ovens & Murray Football League - Hall of Fame 2019

James Grant Deane (2 January 1928 – 14 November 2010) was an Australian rules footballer who played with Richmond in the Victorian Football League (VFL) and South Adelaide in the South Australian National Football League (SANFL).

A half forward flanker, Deane is one of only two South Adelaide players to have won dual Magarey Medals. He won the first in 1953 and the second in 1957, although the latter was not awarded until 1998 when the league decided to give players who lost on a countback over the years their Medal retrospectively. Deane also won six best and fairest awards for South Adelaide and represented South Australia at interstate football on 15 occasions.

Deane coached Myrtleford in the Ovens and Murray Football League from 1958 to 1962. He won the league's Morris Medal in 1958 and 1961.

In 1970 and 1971 he was non-playing coach of South Adelaide.

Deane died in Balaklava, South Australia on 14 November 2010.
