= Len Lapthorne =

Australian rules footballer

Personal information
- Full name: Lenton Lapthorne
- Born: 29 January 1919
- Died: 30 May 1997 (aged 78)
- Position: Rover

Playing career^{1}
Years	Club	Games (Goals)
1937–1941, 1945–1952	South Adelaide	205 (365)
1942–1944	Sturt/South	15 (?)
Total		220 (365)

Representative team honours
Years	Team	Games (Goals)
1947	South Australia	2 (?)
- ^{1} Playing statistics correct to the end of 1952.

Career highlights
- 4 x South Adelaide leading goalkicker (1946, 1948, 1950, 1951); South Adelaide captain 1949–1950; South Adelaide Football Club 'Greatest Team' (Interchange)

Lenton "Len" Lapthorne (29 January 1919 – 30 May 1997) was an Australian rules footballer who played for South Adelaide in the South Australian National Football League (SANFL) between 1937 and 1952. He was appointed Captain of South Adelaide for two seasons from 1949 to 1950.
