= 1964 SANFL Grand Final =

Port Adelaide	South Adelaide
5.12 (42)	9.15 (69)
	1	2	3	4
PTA	0.5 (5)	0.10 (10)	4.12 (36)	5.12 (42)
STH	2.5 (17)	5.6 (36)	7.10 (52)	9.15 (69)
- Date: Saturday, 3 October (2:10 pm)
- Stadium: Adelaide Oval
- Attendance: 56,353

The 1964 SANFL Grand Final was an Australian rules football competition. South Adelaide beat Port Adelaide 9.15 (69) to 5.12 (42).

This win was South Adelaide's eleventh (and as of 2024) most recent premiership, having won the wooden spoon in 1963 with a 1–17 record.
