= SANFL Women's League =

Australian rules football league

- Most recent season or competition: 2026 SANFL Women's League season
- Sport: Australian rules football
- Founded: February 2017
- First season: 2017
- Administrator: SANFL
- No. of teams: 8
- Country: Australia
- Most recent champions: Woodville-West Torrens (1st premiership)
- Most titles: South Adelaide (4 premierships)
- Broadcaster: Seven Network (Grand Final only)
- Website: www.sanfl.com.au/women

SANFL Women's League (also known as the SANFLW or the Hostplus SANFL Women's League) is the major state-level women's Australian rules football league in South Australia.

== History ==
The league was launched in February 2017, initially comprising four clubs (Norwood, Glenelg, North Adelaide and West Adelaide) from the men's South Australian National Football League (SANFL). The league now features eight teams, and acts as the second primary competition for South Australian female footballers underneath the semi-professional national AFL Women's (AFLW) competition, as well as being one of the three elite leagues in women's Australian rules football (the VFLW, SANFLW and WAFLW).

The SANFLW initially ran from February to May, meaning it partially overlapped with the AFLW season prior to AFLW Season 7, and so was mostly played by players either not yet drafted by an AFLW club or AFLW listed players not selected for a senior premiership match.

In 2022, the SANFL Commission introduced the SANFL Women's Development League, a seven-week reserves competition providing players from the eight clubs with the opportunity to play at a level beneath the senior competition. The competition was replaced with the SANFL Under-18 Girls competition in 2026, with the eligibility being players turning 15 (minimum age) to 18 (maximum age) in the calendar year of the season and up to four 19-year-olds per team per match, provided they are listed on a senior team list.

== Clubs ==
The first season comprised four SANFL clubs: Norwood, Glenelg, North Adelaide and West Adelaide. The following year, Sturt and South Adelaide were admitted to the competition, with Woodville-West Torrens and Central District being admitted in 2019.

Neither of the state's two AFL clubs, Adelaide and Port Adelaide, who field reserves teams in the SANFL, field teams in the SANFLW; Adelaide were a foundation club of the AFLW in 2017, while Port Adelaide entered the league in 2022.

Club Name	Club Colours	Club Nickname	Home venue	Est.	First SANFLW season	SANFLW seasons	SANFLW premierships	Most recent
Central District		Bulldogs	Elizabeth Oval	1959	2019	8	1	2023
Glenelg		Tigers	Glenelg Oval	1920	2017	10	1	2021
North Adelaide		Roosters	Prospect Oval	1888	2017	10	2	2022
Norwood		Redlegs	Norwood Oval	1878	2017	10	1	2017
South Adelaide		Panthers	Hickinbotham Oval	1876	2018	9	4	2025
Sturt		Double Blues	Unley Oval	1901	2018	9	0	—
West Adelaide		Bloods	Richmond Oval	1892	2017	10	0	--
Woodville-West Torrens		Eagles	Woodville Oval	1991	2019	8	1	2026

== Honours ==
=== Premiers ===
This lists the most recent premiers. For a full list of premiers see List of SANFL Women's League premiers.

- 2026: Woodville-West Torrens

=== Best and Fairest Award ===
This lists the most recent best and fairest winner. For a full list of winners see SANFL Women's League Best and Fairest Award.

- 2026: Jade Halfpenny (Norwood)

== See also ==
- AFL Women's
- VFL Women's
- South Australian National Football League
