= SANFL Women's League best and fairest =

Award for fairest and best player in the South Australian Football League Women's

SANFLW Best and Fairest Award
- Awarded for: The best and fairest player in the SANFL Women's League
- Country: Australia
- Presented by: SANFL Women's League
- First award: 2017
- Currently held by: Jade Halfpenny (Norwood)

The SANFL Women's League Best and Fairest Medal is awarded to the best and fairest player in the SANFL Women's League (SANFL) during the home-and-away season, as determined by votes cast by the officiating field umpires after each game. Future Greater Western Sydney and Adelaide player Courtney Gum was the inaugural winner of the award in 2017, with Lauren Young the youngest winner of the award after her win in 2021, aged just 15 years in her winning season.

== Criteria ==
Umpires cast their votes for each game independent of eligibility criteria of the players; i.e. umpires can cast votes for players who have already been suspended during that season if they perceive them to be amongst the best on the ground.

== Winners ==
Season	Player	Club	Votes	Ref.
2017	Courtney Gum	Glenelg	13	
2018	Hannah Martin	West Adelaide	11	
2019	Najwa Allen	Norwood	17	
2020	Anne Hatchard	North Adelaide	15	
2020	Rachelle Martin	West Adelaide	15	
2021	Lauren Young	West Adelaide	18	
2022	Jessica Bates	Glenelg	20	
2023	Piper Window	Glenelg	19	
2024	Nikki Nield	South Adelaide	27	
2025	Zoe Venning	West Adelaide	24	
2026	Jade Halfpenny	Norwood	27	

== See also ==
- Magarey Medal
- AFL Women's best and fairest
