= List of SANFL Women's League premiers =

This page is a complete chronological listing of SANFL Women's League premiers. The SANFL Women's League (SANFLW) is the major state-level women's Australian rules football league in South Australia. South Adelaide have won the most titles with three.

== List of premiers ==
The following is a list of premiers and the grand final results.

Premiership decided by a Grand Final
Premiership decided by a Grand Final Replay/ET, after the scheduled Grand Final was drawn

Season	Premiers	Runners-up	Score	Best on Ground Medal	Venue	Date
2017	Norwood	North Adelaide	9.11 (65) d. 6.2 (38)	Sophie Li (Norwood)	Unley Oval	1 April 2017
2018	South Adelaide	Norwood	4.6 (30) d. 4.1 (25)	Cheyenne Hammond (South Adelaide)	Unley Oval	25 April 2018
2019	South Adelaide (2)	North Adelaide (2)	4.7 (31) d. 1.3 (9)	Indy Tahau (South Adelaide)	Glenelg Oval	26 May 2019
2020	North Adelaide	South Adelaide	5.5 (35) d. 4.4 (28)	Anne Hatchard (North Adelaide)	Thebarton Oval	23 August 2020
2021	Glenelg	West Adelaide	5.10 (40) d. 2.5 (17)	Ebony Marinoff (Glenelg)	Thebarton Oval	5 June 2021
2022	North Adelaide (2)	Sturt	7.6 (48) d. 4.6 (30)	Zoe Prowse (Sturt)	Norwood Oval	29 May 2022
2023	Central District	South Adelaide (2)	4.7 (31) d. 4.4 (28)	Shelby Smith (Central District)	Prospect Oval	11 June 2023
2024	South Adelaide (3)	Norwood (2)	3.0 (18) d. 2.1 (13)	Jordann Hickey (South Adelaide)	Norwood Oval	6 July 2024
2025	South Adelaide (4)	Woodville-West Torrens	6.5 (41) d. 2.6 (18)	Emma Charlton (South Adelaide)	Glenelg Oval	27 July 2025
2026	Woodville-West Torrens	Norwood (3)	9.4 (58) d. 3.8 (26)	Klaudia O’Neill (Woodville-West Torrens)	Alberton Oval	29 August 2026

Table correct to the end of the 2026 season.

== Premierships by team ==
This table summarises all premierships won by each team.

Club	Grand final matches	Premierships		Runners-up		Years since last premiership
Club	Grand final matches	Total	Years	Total	Years	Years since last premiership
South Adelaide	6	4	2018, 2019, 2024, 2025	2	2020, 2023	1
North Adelaide	4	2	2020, 2022	2	2017, 2019	3
Norwood	4	1	2017	3	2018, 2024, 2026	8
Woodville-West Torrens	2	1	2026	1	2025	0
Glenelg	1	1	2021	0	—	4
Central District	1	1	2023	0	—	2
West Adelaide	1	0	—	1	2021	—
Sturt	1	0	—	1	2022	—

Table correct to the end of the 2026 season.

=== Premiership frequency ===
Club	Years in competition	Seasons	Premierships	Runners-up	Strike rate (based on seasons in competition)	Average years per	
Club	Years in competition	Seasons	Premierships	Runners-up	Strike rate (based on seasons in competition)	Premiership	Grand final
South Adelaide	2018–present	9	4	2	44.44%	2.25	1.50
North Adelaide	2017–present	10	2	2	20.00%	5.00	2.50
Central District	2019–present	8	1	0	12.50%	8.00	8.00
Norwood	2017–present	10	1	2	10.00%	10.00	3.33
Glenelg	2017–present	10	1	0	10.00%	10.00	10.00
West Adelaide	2017–present	10	0	1	0.00%	—	10.00
Sturt	2018–present	9	0	1	0.00%	—	9.00
Woodville-West Torrens	2019–present	8	1	1	12.50%	8.00	4.00

Table correct to the end of the 2026 season.

=== Premiership droughts ===
The duration of the drought is given as the number of full seasons contested between premierships; the season in which the drought is broken is considered to be part of the drought, and if the drought began from a club's entry to the league, the club's inaugural season is also considered to be part of the drought.

^{+} Drought began upon club's entry to league

Club	Seasons	Start	Grand final appearances during drought
West Adelaide	10	2017^{+}	2021
Sturt	9	2018^{+}	2022
Norwood	8	2018	2024, 2026
Glenelg	5	2021	
North Adelaide	4	2022	
Central District	3	2023	
South Adelaide	1	2025	
Woodville-West Torrens	0	2026	

Table correct to the end of the 2026 season.

== Minor grades ==
=== Development League (2022–2025) ===
The Development League was introduced ahead of the 2022 season as a de-facto reserves grade competition contested by all eight SANFLW clubs. There were no age-range restrictions imposed on players. The competition was discontinued after the 2025 season.

Season	Premiers	Runners-up	Score	Venue	Date	Ref.
2022	No grand final was held. North Adelaide finished the season on top of the ladder and are regarded as premiers in official league documents.					
2023	South Adelaide	Norwood	3.7 (25) d. 3.0 (18)	Norwood Oval	22 April 2023	
2024	South Adelaide	Glenelg	3.3 (21) d. 1.3 (9)	Hickinbotham Oval	27 April 2024	
2025	Glenelg	South Adelaide	6.7 (43) d. 3.4 (22)	Glenelg Oval	27 April 2025	

=== Under 18s premiers (2026–present) ===
An under-18 girls competition was introduced ahead of the 2026 season to replace the development league. Players turning 15 to 18 in the calendar year of the season are permitted to play, as are up to four 19 year olds per team per match, provided they are listed on the club's senior list.

Season	Premiers	Runners-up	Score	Venue	Date	Ref.
2026	Norwood	Central District	7.0 (42) d. 3.20 (20)	Elizabeth Oval	3 May 2026	

== Sources ==
- Official website
