= Hickinbotham Oval =

Australian Football Stadium

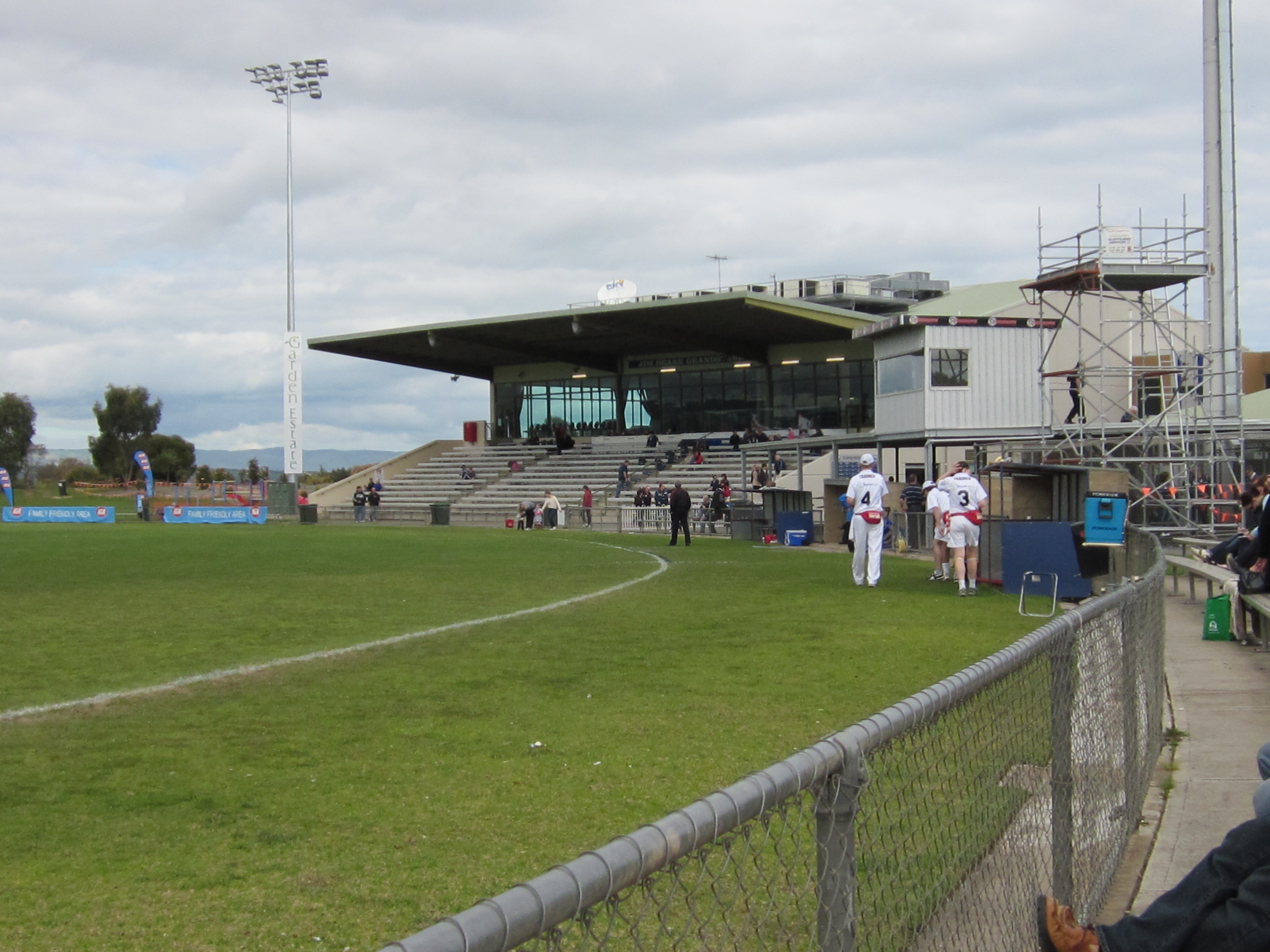
- The Jim Deane Grandstand
- Interactive map of Hickinbotham Oval
- Former names: Hickinbotham Oval, Noarlunga Oval, Flinders University Stadium
- Address: Adelaide; Australia
- Location: 1 Lovelock Drive, Noarlunga Downs, South Australia
- Coordinates: 35°8′43″S 138°29′36″E
- Owner: South Adelaide Football Club
- Operator: South Adelaide Football Club
- Capacity: 12,000
- Surface: Grass
- Record attendance: 10,123 – South Adelaide vs Glenelg, 6 May 1995
- Field size: 170m x 135m

Construction
- Groundbreaking: 1994
- Opened: 1995

Tenant
- South Adelaide Football Club (1995–present)

Hickinbotham Oval (traditionally referred to as Noarlunga Oval and known under naming rights as Magain Stadium) is an Australian rules football stadium in Noarlunga Downs, an outer-southern suburb of Adelaide. It has been the home of South Australian National Football League (SANFL) club South Adelaide Football Club (also known as "The Panthers") since 1995. In 2024 the ground was re-named Magain Stadium as part of a ten-year sponsorship deal with Magain Real Estate.

South Adelaide decided to move to the southern suburb of Noarlunga in the early 1990s, after 111 years (1882-1903 and 1904-1994) of playing home games at the Adelaide Oval, located on the northern side of the Adelaide city centre and the Torrens River.

The club played two games at the Bice Oval in Christies Beach (approximately 1.5 km from Noarlunga Oval) in 1992 and 1993 to gauge support in the area for the club. An overflow crowd of approximately 8,000 fans occupied Bice Oval in 1993 to see the Panthers' match against the Glenelg Tigers. The level of community support was a determining factor in South Adelaide's decision to permanently move to Noarlunga, becoming a community based club for the first time in its then 119-year history.

The Panthers' clubrooms and administration offices, previously located on South Road at St Marys (opposite the then Mitsubishi Motors factory at Tonsley Park), were also relocated to the Noarlunga Oval.

== History ==
=== SANFL ===
The stadium has a capacity of 12,000 people, with seating for up to 1,000 in the Jim Deane Grandstand, named in honor of South Adelaide's 1953 and 1957 Magarey Medallist. The record crowd for Noarlunga is 10,123 attending the SANFL match between South Adelaide and Glenelg on 6 May 1995 – the first SANFL match played at the venue.

The stadium is located at the top of a hill, and is known for its cold southerly wind and wet weather coming straight from the nearby Gulf St Vincent, something which is generally unpopular with spectators as only the grandstand and a roofed standing-room-only area in front of the change rooms offer any protection from the weather.

Magain Stadium's dimensions are 170×135 m, giving it the widest playing surface in the SANFL. To entertain fans, the South Adelaide Football Club has introduced a gas powered fireball that shoots up at the start of all four-quarters of Panthers night games. The fireball, located in the south east corner of the ground near the scoreboard, also ignites every time the Panthers league team kicks a goal.

The venue was renamed from Noarlunga Oval to Hickinbotham Oval in 2005 to honour former Panther captain-coach and successful property developer Alan Hickinbotham. In 2018 the strong partnership between South Adelaide and Flinders University reached the next level, with the club announcing that the ground would be re-named Flinders University Stadium, as part of a five-year deal with Flinders University.

Along with the Norwood and Richmond Ovals, Flinders University Stadium is one of only three SANFL grounds not used for cricket during the summer months.

In late 2010 the South Adelaide Football Club obtained permission from the City of Onkaparinga to install four light towers at the oval, with the intent to host night SANFL games at the venue.

The first official SANFL night game was played at the oval on 21 April 2011, with the Panthers defeating Port Adelaide in front of the ground's night attendance record crowd of 2,700. However, the lights failed at the start of a Souths v Adelaide Crows game in 2015 and the organisers had to reorganise the match schedule for the 2015 season.

=== Southern Football League (SFL) ===
As Magain Stadium has the largest spectator capacity, and has the most modern facilities, of any outdoor sports venue in the southern suburbs, it has been used as the Grand Final venue for the Southern Football League since 2005.

== Access ==
Magain Stadium is easily accessed by both road and public transport. The oval is located approximately 600 metres south of Noarlunga Centre railway station which is serviced by both bus and rail, with the rail line having been upgraded in 2013, and an extension beyond Noarlunga Centre to Seaford which opened in February 2014.
