= Deaths in August 1990 =

The following is a list of notable deaths in August 1990.

Entries for each day are listed alphabetically by surname. A typical entry lists information in the following sequence:

- Name, age, country of citizenship at birth, subsequent country of citizenship (if applicable), reason for notability, cause of death (if known), and reference.

== August 1990 ==
=== 1 ===
- Michel Arnaud, 74, French general, heart attack.
- Roar Berthelsen, 55, Norwegian Olympic long jumper (1960).
- Leo Des Vignes, Trinidadian politician, MP (since 1987).
- Carl Ekern, 36, American football player (Los Angeles Rams), traffic collision.
- Norbert Elias, 93, German sociologist.
- Michael Glenny, 62, British academic and translator, heart attack.
- Lotta Hitschmanova, 80, Czech-Canadian humanitarian, cancer.
- Robert Krieps, 67, Luxembourgish politician.
- Bárbara Mujica, 46, Argentine actress, heart attack.
- Tiger Joginder Singh, 71, Indian professional wrestler.
- Graham Young, 42, English convicted serial killer, heart attack.

=== 2 ===
- Fahad Al-Ahmed Al-Jaber Al-Sabah, 44, Kuwaiti royal and sports administrator, killed in battle.
- André De Wulf, 67, Belgian Olympic bobsledder (1952).
- Adonias Filho, 74, Brazilian writer.
- Al Guokas, 64, American basketball player (Philadelphia Warriors).
- Norman Maclean, 87, American novelist.
- François Perrier, 68, French psychoanalyst.
- Edwin Richfield, 68, English actor.
- Nikolaus Riehl, 89, German nuclear physicist.
- Al Rosen, 80, American actor, cancer.

=== 3 ===
- Betty Amann, 85, German-American film actress.
- Nella Maria Bonora, 86, Italian actress.
- Bob Brown, 79, American baseball player (Boston Braves/Bees).
- Thomas Dunne, 64, Irish politician.
- Jeff Modesitt, 26, American football player (Tampa Bay Buccaneers).
- M. Ranga Rao, 58, Indian composer, cancer.
- Wilbur Schwartz, 72, American musician.
- George Stavrinos, 42, Greek-American illustrator, complications of pneumonia.
- Mariano Trigo, 89, Spanish Olympic water polo player (1928).
- Paul Watkins, 40, American cult member (Manson Family), leukemia.

=== 4 ===
- Ian Allison, 81, Canadian Olympic basketball player (1936).
- As'ad Syamsul Arifin, 92-93, Indonesian ulama.
- Mathias Goeritz, 75, German-Mexican artist.
- Chua Phung Kim, 51, Singaporean weightlifter and Olympian (1964).
- Norman Malcolm, 79, American philosopher.
- Ettore Maserati, 95-96, Italian automotive engineer (Maserati).
- Wajahat Mirza, 82, Indian filmmaker.
- Pierre Nguyễn Huy Mai, 77, Vietnamese Roman Catholic prelate, bishop of Ban Mê Thuột (1967–1990).
- Lajos Somló, 77, Hungarian Olympic triple jumper (1936).
- John T. Wilson, 76, American academic.

=== 5 ===
- Ivan Blatný, 70, Czech-British poet.
- Aldo Grimaldi, 47-48, Italian filmmaker, cancer.
- Jacob J. Hecht, 66, American rabbi, writer and radio commentator, heart attack.
- Jack Hubbert, 74, Australian rules footballer.
- Ellis T. Johnson, 79, American multi-sport athlete and coach.
- Kazimierz Kaszuba, 60, Polish Olympic football player (1952).
- Zhou Keqin, 53, Chinese writer.
- George Quin, 76, Irish Anglican prelate.

=== 6 ===
- Charles Arnt, 83, American actor, cancer.
- Taylor G. Belcher, 70, American diplomat, cancer.
- Leo Bird, 81, Australian rules footballer.
- Gordon Bunshaft, 81, American architect.
- George Dixon, 56, Canadian football player.
- Luis Lucchetti, 87, Argentine Olympic fencer (1924, 1928, 1936).
- Magnús Pálsson, 77, Icelandic Olympic water polo player (1936).
- Lemuel Cornick Shepherd, Jr., 94, American general, bone cancer.
- Jacques Soustelle, 78, French politician.
- Antoon van Schendel, 80, Dutch road bicycle racer.
- Pat Wall, 57, English politician.

=== 7 ===
- Diego Carpitella, 66, Italian professor of ethnomusicology.
- Tamara Deutscher, 77, Polish-British writer.
- Phiny Dick, 77, Dutch illustrator and children's writer.
- Gebhard Müller, 90, German politician.
- Chepudira Muthana Poonacha, 79, Indian politician.

=== 8 ===
- Harry Bulpit, 95, Australian rules footballer.
- Andrzej Dobrowolski, 68, Polish composer.
- Wallace Douglas, 78, Canadian producer, director and actor.
- Joseph H. Harper, 89, United States Army officer.
- Laurier Régnier, 86, Canadian politician, member of the House of Commons of Canada (1958–1962).
- Gopal Singh, 72, Indian Governor and politician.
- Urho Teräs, 75, Finnish football player.

=== 9 ===
- Dorothy Appleby, 84, American actress.
- William Bosworth Castle, 92, American physician.
- Joe Mercer, 76, English football player.
- Władysław Orlicz, 87, Polish mathematician.
- Max Starcevich, 78, American football player.
- Art Van Tone, 71, American gridiron football player (Detroit Lions).

=== 10 ===
- Jacobo Arenas, 66, Colombian guerrilla leader, cancer.
- Harold Boyd, 89, Australian football player.
- Martha Dodd, 81, American writer.
- Cookie Lavagetto, 77, American baseball player (Pittsburgh Pirates, Brooklyn Dodgers).
- Helmut Lipfert, 74, German flying ace during World War II.
- David Martin, 57, Australian politician, lung cancer.
- Eugenia Ravasio, 82, Italian Roman Catholic nun.
- Joško Vidošević, 55, Yugoslav football player.

=== 11 ===
- Bonnie Baker, 73, American singer.
- Gonzalo Gaviria, 43, Colombian drug lord, shot.
- Asa S. Knowles, 81, American academic.
- Charles Marquis Warren, 77, American filmmaker, ventricular aneurysm.
- Florio Martel, 67, French Olympic field hockey player (1952).
- Guy le Mouroux, 72, French Olympic sailor (1952).

=== 12 ===
- Paul Cuba, 82, American football player (Philadelphia Eagles).
- Ethyl Eichelberger, 45, American drag queen, suicide by exsanguination.
- Les Harvey, 81, Australian rules footballer.
- Christa Jungnickel, 55, German-American science historian.
- B. Kliban, 55, American cartoonist, pulmonary embolism.
- Dorothy Mackaill, 87, British-American actress, liver failure.
- Piotr Perkowski, 89, Polish composer.
- Sara Seegar, 76, American actress, cerebral hemorrhage.
- James Stewart, 80, Canadian Olympic basketball player (1936).
- Fay Thomas, 86, American baseball player, suicide by gunshot.
- Roy Williamson, 54, Scottish songwriter, brain cancer.

=== 13 ===
- Caridad Bravo Adams, 82, Mexican screenwriter.
- Dallas Bixler, 80, American Olympic gymnast (1932).
- Hedley Donovan, 76, American magazine editor.
- Inés Mendoza, 82, Puerto Rican writer, first lady (1949–1965).
- Alejandro Otero, 69, Venezuelan painter and sculptor.
- Jimmy Starr, 86, American screenwriter.
- Henry Swoboda, 92, Czech-American conductor.

=== 14 ===
- Henry Crown, 94, American industrialist.
- John Fox, 38, American writer, AIDS.
- Lafayette Leake, 71, American jazz musician, diabetes.
- Sun Lianzhong, 97, Taiwanese general.
- Thomas Matthewman, 87, British Olympic sprinter (1924).
- Liu Xingyuan, 81, Chinese politician and general.

=== 15 ===
- Nina Bara, 70, American actress.
- Jimmy Carruthers, 61, Australian boxer and Olympian (1948), lung cancer.
- Lew DeWitt, 52, American musician, kidney failure.
- Bob Garbark, 80, American baseball player.
- Billy Hume, 54, Scottish football player.
- Inger Koppernæs, 62, Norwegian politician.
- Kalamandalam Krishnan Nair, 76, Indian dancer.
- Arthur McMahon, 69, Irish Olympic sports shooter (1968, 1972).
- Zdenko Švigelj, 87, Yugoslavian Olympic cross-country skier (1924).
- Viktor Tsoi, 28, Soviet singer, traffic collision.
- Louis Vola, 88, French bassist.

=== 16 ===
- Frank Asling, 78, Australian rules footballer.
- Pierre Bonnet, 92, French arachnologist.
- Bobby Gordon, 54, American football player (Chicago Cardinals, Houston Oilers).
- Louis Kozma, 52, Belgian Olympic swimmer (1956).
- Pat O'Connor, 65, New Zealand wrestler, cancer.
- Ernest Pogosyants, 55, Soviet chess player.
- Ricardo Saprissa, 89, Salvadoran-Costa Rican football player and tennis Olympian (1924).

=== 17 ===
- Pearl Bailey, 72, American actress (Hello, Dolly!) and singer ("Takes Two to Tango"), cardiovascular disease.
- David A. Burchinal, 75, American general, cancer.
- Roderick Cook, 58, English actor and playwright, heart attack.
- James Thomas Foley, 80, American district judge (United States District Court for the Northern District of New York).
- Ian Handysides, 27, English footballer, brain cancer.
- Gordon Parsons, 63, Australian country music singer-songwriter.
- Maria Paudler, 87, German actress.
- Larry Weldon, 75, American football player (Washington Redskins).
- Graham Williams, 45, English television producer, shot.

=== 18 ===
- Edmund Edwards, 80, Australian cricketer.
- Grethe Ingmann, 52, Danish singer, cancer.
- József Kovács, 79, Hungarian Olympic hurdler (1936).
- D. Scott Rogo, 40, American writer, murdered.
- Mary Shaw Shorb, 83, American biochemist.
- B. F. Skinner, 86, American social philosopher, leukemia.

=== 19 ===
- Olavi Alakulppi, 75, Finnish military officer and cross-country skier.
- Ilham Aliyev, 29, Soviet Azerbaijani soldier, killed in battle.
- Jim Cavanagh, 77, Australian politician.
- Ercole Gallegati, 78, Italian Olympic wrestler (1932, 1936, 1948, 1952).
- Tony Mancini, 77, Canadian Olympic boxer (1932).
- Sandy Paris, 81, Scottish cricketer.
- Anna Rutgers van der Loeff, 80, Dutch writer of children's novels.
- Stephen Edward Smith, 62, American political consultant, lung cancer.
- Richard Strout, 92, American journalist, complications from a fall.

=== 20 ===
- Tim Barrett, 61, English actor.
- Larry Buhler, 73, American NFL player (Green Bay Packers).
- Howard Clifton, 51, American Olympic bobsledder (1968).
- Bill Curry, 54, English football player.
- Wiley Feagin, 52, American football player (Baltimore Colts, Washington Redskins).
- Rudolf Gellesch, 76, German football player and Olympian (1936).
- Maurice Gendron, 69, French cellist.
- Ray Johnson, 75, American gridiron football player (Cleveland Rams, Chicago Bears, Chicago Cardinals).
- John La Nauze, 79, Australian historian.
- Ike Sewell, 86, American businessman (Uno Pizzeria & Grill), leukemia.

=== 21 ===
- Antonio Argilés, 58, Spanish footballer.
- Larry Buhler, 73, American football player.
- Ed Glancy, 73, American basketball player.
- Bill Lasley, 88, American baseball player (St. Louis Browns).
- Bob Uhl, 76, American baseball player (Chicago White Sox, Detroit Tigers).

=== 22 ===
- Luigi Dadaglio, 75, Italian Roman Catholic cardinal.
- Patrick McAlinney, 76, Irish actor.
- Edward W. Pattison, 58, American politician, member of the U.S. House of Representatives (1975–1979), liver cancer.
- Boris Shcherbina, 70, Soviet politician.

=== 23 ===
- Samuel J. Brown, 72, American fighter pilot during World War II.
- Ron Clegg, 62, Australian rules footballer.
- Yutaka Kanai, 30, Japanese Olympic runner (1984), accident.
- Billy King, 70, Australian rules footballer.
- Karl Löwenstein-Wertheim-Rosenberg, 86, German noble, head of the house of Löwenstein-Wertheim (since 1952).
- Parviz Natel-Khanlari, 76, Iranian politician.
- David Rose, 80, American songwriter ("The Stripper"), heart attack.
- Omero Tognon, 66, Italian football player.

=== 24 ===
- Victor Civita, 83, Italian-Brazilian journalist and publisher.
- Sergei Dovlatov, 48, Soviet writer, heart failure.
- Francis Hastings, 16th Earl of Huntingdon, 89, British politician and artist.
- Harold Masursky, 67, American geologist.
- Nick Metz, 76, Canadian ice hockey player (Toronto Maple Leafs).
- Jack Sanders, 86, Australian rules footballer.
- Mickey Witek, 74, American baseball player (New York Giants, New York Yankees).

=== 25 ===
- Talbert Abrams, 95, American photographer and aviator.
- Willard Leon Beaulac, 91, American diplomat, Alzheimer's disease.
- Morley Callaghan, 87, Canadian writer.
- David Hampshire, 72, British racing driver.

=== 26 ===
- Mehdi Akhavan-Sales, 61, Iranian poet.
- Sir Peter Agnew, 1st Baronet, 90, British politician.
- Mário Pinto de Andrade, 62, Angolan poet and politician.
- Sture Ericson, 61, Swedish Olympic modern pentathlete (1960).
- Stuart Hamilton, 71, Australian rules footballer.
- Minoru Honda, 77, Japanese astronomer.
- Roh Ogura, 74, Japanese composer.
- Paul Potts, 79, British-Canadian poet.
- Retta Scott, 74, American animator.
- Tom Toner, 40, American football player (Green Bay Packers), cancer.

=== 27 ===
- Avdy Andresson, 90, Estonian Minister of War in exile
- Ed Balatti, 66, American football player (San Francisco 49ers).
- Kathleen Fitzpatrick, 84, Australian historian.
- Raymond St. Jacques, 60, American actor and filmmaker, lymphoma.
- Ramón Piñeiro López, 75, Spanish writer and politician.
- Armin Scheurer, 72, Swiss Olympic athlete (1948), and football coach.
- Stevie Ray Vaughan, 35, American blues musician and guitarist, helicopter crash.

=== 28 ===
- Sumitra Devi, 67, Indian actress.
- Larry Jackson, 59, American baseball player (St. Louis Cardinals, Chicago Cubs, Philadelphia Phillies), cancer.
- Gedeon Ladányi, 76, Hungarian Olympic speed skater (1948).
- Richard Lauffen, 83, German actor.
- Edmund H. North, 79, American screenwriter.
- Rosely Roth, 31, Brazilian LGBT activist, suicide.
- Paul Rowe, 73, Canadian football player.
- Victorio Spinetto, 79, Argentine footballer.
- Eva Stiberg, 69, Swedish actress.
- Willy Vandersteen, 77, Belgian cartoonist (Spike and Suzy).
- Earl Ernest Veron, 68, American district judge (United States District Court for the Western District of Louisiana).

=== 29 ===
- Luigi Beccali, 82, Italian Olympic runner (1928, 1932, 1936).
- Manly Palmer Hall, 89, Canadian philosopher.
- Chin Fung Kee, 70, Malaysian civil engineer.
- Solomon Mikhlin, 82, Soviet mathematician, stroke.
- Sayyid Shahab al-DIn Mar'ashi Najafi, 93, Iraqi Marja'.
- Juozas Vinča, 84, Lithuanian-American boxer and Olympian (1928).

=== 30 ===
- Rhett Baynes, 26, Australian rules footballer.
- Lou Garland, 85, American baseball player (Chicago White Sox).
- Edmund G. Love, 78, American author, heart attack.
- Ch'ien Mu, 95, Chinese-Taiwanese historian and philosopher.
- Bernard D. H. Tellegen, 90, Dutch electrical engineer.

=== 31 ===
- Bert Assirati, 82, English professional wrestler, bladder cancer.
- Nathaniel Clifton, 67, American Hall of Fame basketball player (New York Knicks, Detroit Pistons).
- James H. Donovan, 66, American politician, colon cancer.
- André Dufau, 85, French Olympic sprinter (1928).
- Henry From, 64, Danish footballer and Olympian (1952, 1960).
- Frank Hindman Golay, 75, American economist.
- Johnny Lindsay, 81, South African cricket player.
- Jack Marshall, 82, American baseball player.
- Jack C. Rowan, 79, American football coach.
- Sergey Volkov, 41, Soviet figure skater and Olympian (1968, 1976), stomach cancer.
