= 1984 Australian Football Championships =

Australian football tournament

Tournament information
- Sport: Australian football
- Location: Adelaide and Perth, Australia
- Dates: 15 May 1984–17 July 1984
- Format: Round Robin
- Teams: 3

Final champion
- Western Australia

The 1984 Australian Football Championships was an Australian football series between representative teams of the three major football states. Games involving Victoria were played under State of Origin rules, whilst the match between Western Australia and South Australia involved players based in their respective states at the time. The competition was won by Western Australia.

== Results ==
=== Game 1 ===
Home team	Home team score	Away team	Away team score	Ground	Crowd	Date	Time	Broadcast Network
Victoria	16.12 (108)	South Australia	16.8 (104)	Football Park	52,719	15 May 1984	8:00pm	Seven

- Fos Williams Medal: Stephen Kernahan (South Australia)

=== Game 2 ===
Home team	Home team score	Away team	Away team score	Ground	Crowd	Date	Time	Broadcast Network
Western Australia	14.14 (98)	South Australia	14.13 (97)	Football Park	26,649	9 June 1984		

- Fos Williams Medal: Garry McIntosh (South Australia)

=== Game 3 ===
Home team	Home team score	Away team	Away team score	Ground	Crowd	Date	Time	Broadcast Network
Western Australia	21.16 (142)	Victoria	21.12 (138)	Subiaco Oval	42,500	17 July 1984		Seven

- Simpson Medal: Brad Hardie (Western Australia)
- Tassie Medal: Brad Hardie (Western Australia)

== Standings ==
1984 Australian Championship
Pos	Team	Pld	W	L	D	PF	PA	PP	Pts
1	Western Australia	2	2	0	0	240	235	102.1	4
2	Victoria	2	1	1	0	246	246	100.0	2
3	South Australia	2	0	2	0	201	206	97.6	0

== Squads ==
Western Australia

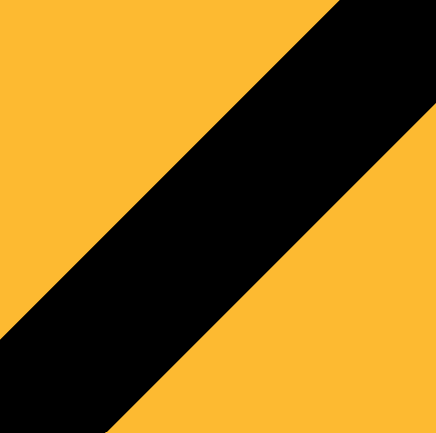

Coach/es: John Todd
Captain/s: Steve Malaxos
Vice Captain/s:
Deputy Vice Captain/s:
Both Games

- Michael Aitken (Claremont)
- Peter Bosustow (Perth)
- Gavin Carter (South Fremantle)
- Allen Daniels (Claremont)
- Brad Hardie (South Fremantle)
- Paul Harding (East Fremantle)
- Don Langsford (Swan Districts)
- Steve Malaxos (Claremont)
- Murray Rance (Swan Districts)
- Robert Wiley (Perth)

vs South Australia

- Rhett Baynes (Perth)
- Leigh Brenton (Swan Districts)
- Grant Campbell (East Perth)
- Jon Fogarty (Swan Districts)
- David Hart (South Fremantle)
- Don Holmes (Swan Districts)
- Laurie Keene (Subiaco)
- Warren Mosconi (South Fremantle)
- Darrell Panizza (Claremont)
- Peter Ware (Swan Districts)
- Greg Wilkinson (Subiaco)

vs Victoria

- Leon Baker (Swan Districts)
- Wayne Blackwell (Carlton)
- Phil Cronan (St Kilda)
- Jon Dorotich (South Fremantle)
- Ross Glendinning (North Melbourne)
- Craig Holden (Sydney)
- Brian Peake (Geelong)
- Andrew Purser (Footscray)
- Mike Richardson (Collingwood)
- Maurice Rioli (Richmond)
- Garry Sidebottom (Fitzroy)
- Kevin Taylor (East Fremantle)
Victoria

Coach/es: Allan Jeans
Captain/s:
Vice Captain/s:
Deputy Vice Captain/s:
Both Games

- David Ackerly (Sydney)
- Jim Buckley (Carlton)
- Geoff Cunningham (St Kilda)
- Bernie Evans (Sydney)
- Doug Hawkins (Footscray)
- Gerard Healy (Melbourne)
- Wayne Johnston (Carlton)
- Simon Madden (Essendon)
- Chris Mew (Hawthorn)
- Peter Moore (Melbourne)
- Gary Pert (Fitzroy)
- Michael Tuck (Hawthorn)

vs South Australia

- Mark Bos (Geelong)
- Dennis Carroll (Sydney)
- Peter Daicos (Collingwood)
- Bruce Doull (Carlton)
- Keith Greig (North Melbourne)
- Jim Jess (Richmond)
- John Kennedy (Hawthorn)
- Mark Lee (Richmond)
- Stephen McCann (North Melbourne)
- Paul Salmon (Essendon)
- Tim Watson (Essendon)
- Garry Wilson (Fitzroy)

vs Western Australia

- Gary Ablett (Geelong)
- Gary Ayres (Hawthorn)
- Terry Daniher (Essendon)
- Robert DiPierdomenico (Hawthorn)
- Russell Greene (Hawthorn)
- Steven Icke (Melbourne)
- Roger Merrett (Essendon)
- Tony Shaw (Collingwood)
- Michael Turner (Geelong)
- Darren Williams (Essendon)

Did not play

- Rod Ashman (Carlton)
- Dermott Brereton (Hawthorn)
- Des English (Carlton)
- Alan Jarrott (Melbourne)
- Mervyn Keane (Richmond)
- Tony Lockett (St Kilda)
- Geoff Raines (Collingwood)
- Paul Vander Haar (Essendon)
South Australia

Coach/es: Neil Kerley
Captain/s: Greg Phillips
Vice Captain/s: Greg Phillips
Deputy Vice Captain/s:
Both Games

- Craig Bradley (Port Adelaide)
- Grantley Fielke (West Adelaide)
- Stephen Kernahan (Glenelg)
- Martin Leslie (Port Adelaide)
- Garry McIntosh (Norwood)
- Peter Motley (Sturt)
- Mark Naley (South Adelaide)
- Michael Redden (North Adelaide)
- Neville Roberts (Norwood)
- Lee Robson (West Torrens)
- Dwayne Russell (Port Adelaide)
- John Schneebichler (South Adelaide)
- Robin White (South Adelaide)

vs Victoria

- Neil Craig (Sturt)
- Greg Phillips (Collingwood)
- Greg Anderson (Port Adelaide)
- Tony Giles (Port Adelaide)
- Russell Johnston (Port Adelaide)
- Robin McKinnon (West Adelaide)
- Max Parker (Woodville)
- John Platten (Central District)

vs Western Australia

- Michael Aish (Norwood)
- Peter Carey (Glenelg)
- Mark Dreher (Collingwood)
- Bruce Lindsay (West Torrens)
- David Marshall (Glenelg)
- Tony McGuinness (Glenelg)
- John Paynter (Sturt)
- Tom Warhurst (Norwood)

Did not play

- Ian Borchard (West Adelaide)
- Richard Cousins (Central District)
- Paul Martin (South Adelaide)
- John Riley (North Adelaide)
- Jamie Thomas (Central District)
