= Jacob Hecht =

Jacob Hecht may refer to:

- Chic Hecht (Mayer Jacob Hecht, 1928–2006), U.S Senator and U.S. Ambassador
- Jacob J. Hecht (died 1990), Chabad rabbi, educator, writer and radio commentator
