= Leslie Harvey (disambiguation) =

Leslie Harvey was a Scottish guitarist

Leslie or Les Harvey may also refer to:

- Leslie Harvey (RAF officer) (1896–1972), British Royal Air Force officer
- Les Harvey (footballer) (1909–1990), Australian footballer for Collingwood
- Leslie Harvey Eyres (1892–1983), Canadian businessman and politician
