= 1957 Copa del Generalísimo final =

Copa del Generalísimo 1957 final
- Event: 1957 Copa del Generalísimo
Barcelona	Espanyol
1	0
- Date: 16 June 1957
- Venue: Montjuic, Barcelona
- Referee: Daniel Zariquiegui
- Attendance: 75,000

The Copa del Generalísimo 1957 final was the 55th final of the King's Cup. The final was played at Montjuic in Barcelona, on 16 June 1957, being won by CF Barcelona, who beat RCD Español 1–0.

== Details ==
16 June 1957
18:00 CET

Barcelona	1–0	Espanyol
Sampedro 80'	Report

Montjuic, Barcelona
Attendance: 75,000
Referee: Daniel Zariquiegui

Barcelona
Espanyol

GK	1	(Spain) Antoni Ramallets
DF	2	(Spain) Ferran Olivella
DF	3	(Spain) Joaquim Brugué
DF	4	(Spain) Juan Segarra (c)
MF	5	(Spain) Martí Vergés
MF	6	(Spain) Enric Gensana
FW	7	(Spain) Estanislau Basora
FW	8	(Uruguay) Ramón Villaverde
FW	9	(Paraguay) Eulogio Martínez
FW	10	(Hungary) László Kubala
FW	11	(Spain) Francisco Sampedro
Manager:
(Spain) Domènec Balmanya

GK	1	(Spain) José Vicente
DF	2	(Spain) Antonio Argilés
DF	3	(Spain) Cata (c)
DF	4	(Spain) Agustín Faura
MF	5	(Spain) Emilio Gámiz
MF	6	(Spain) David Casamitjana
FW	7	(Spain) José María Ruiz
FW	8	(Argentina) Oswaldo
FW	9	(Spain) Antonio Cruellas
FW	10	(Spain) José Sastre
FW	11	(Argentina) Oscar Coll
Manager:
(Spain) Ricardo Zamora

== See also ==
- Derbi barceloní
