= Stuart Hamilton (disambiguation) =

Stuart Hamilton (1929–2017) was a Canadian pianist, operatic vocal coach, radio broadcaster, artistic director, and producer.

Stuart Hamilton may also refer to:

- Stuart Hamilton (public servant) (born 1950), Australian senior public servant
- Stuart Hamilton (footballer) (1918–1990), Australian rules footballer
