= Jack Sanders =

Jack Sanders may refer to:

- Jack Sanders (sledge hockey) (born 1958), American ice sledge hockey player
- Jack Sanders (Australian footballer) (1904–1990), Australian rules footballer
- Jack Sanders (English footballer) (born 1999), English footballer
- Jack Sanders (American football) (1917–1991), American football guard
