= Aaron Raskin =

American religious leader and rabbi

Aaron L. Raskin is an American Chabad Lubavitch rabbi and writer. He serves as spiritual leader of Congregation B'nai Avraham, an Orthodox synagogue in Brooklyn Heights, New York, and dean of Brooklyn Heights Jewish Academy.

== Early life ==
Aaron Raskin was born to Benzion and Bassie Raskin and raised in Crown Heights, a neighborhood in Brooklyn, New York. His maternal grandfather was Jacob J. Hecht, official translator of Lubavitcher Rebbe Menachem Mendel Schneerson, and Shea Hecht is his maternal uncle. His grandfather's strong influence plus the fact that Raskin himself came from a long line of rabbis, with all his maternal uncles being rabbis, helped him decide to embark on a rabbinical path. Raskin graduated from the United Lubavitcher Yeshiva and the Rabbinical College of America with a BA in Rabbinical Studies.

Raskin served as a shliach (emissary) of the Lubavitcher Rebbe in Great Britain, and was the representative on Jewish leadership on a visit to the House of Lords. In doing so, he was following in the footsteps of his grandfather, who had served on the Ethics Committees during the administrations of President George H. W. Bush and New York Governor Mario Cuomo.

== Rabbinical career ==
=== Congregation B'nai Avraham ===
As the shliach of the Rebbe to Downtown Brooklyn, Raskin founded Congregation B'nai Avraham at 117 Remsen Street in Brooklyn Heights at age 21 with a handful of families. It eventually grew into a sizable and active congregation. A pre-school called Kiddie Korner that started inside the synagogue's brownstone location, expanded in 2009 to include a day care center called Gan Menachem, housed in a glass-fronted street-level site at the intersection of Clinton and Montague streets. The families served by the pre-school and daycare are a diverse group that includes secular Jews, less-observant Jews, and some non-Jews. In 2007, the synagogue's stoop was defaced with a swastika. In March 2009 during Purim, Raskin, while wearing The Man with the Yellow Hat costume, helped police to catch a thief who had been robbing the synagogue's charity boxes.

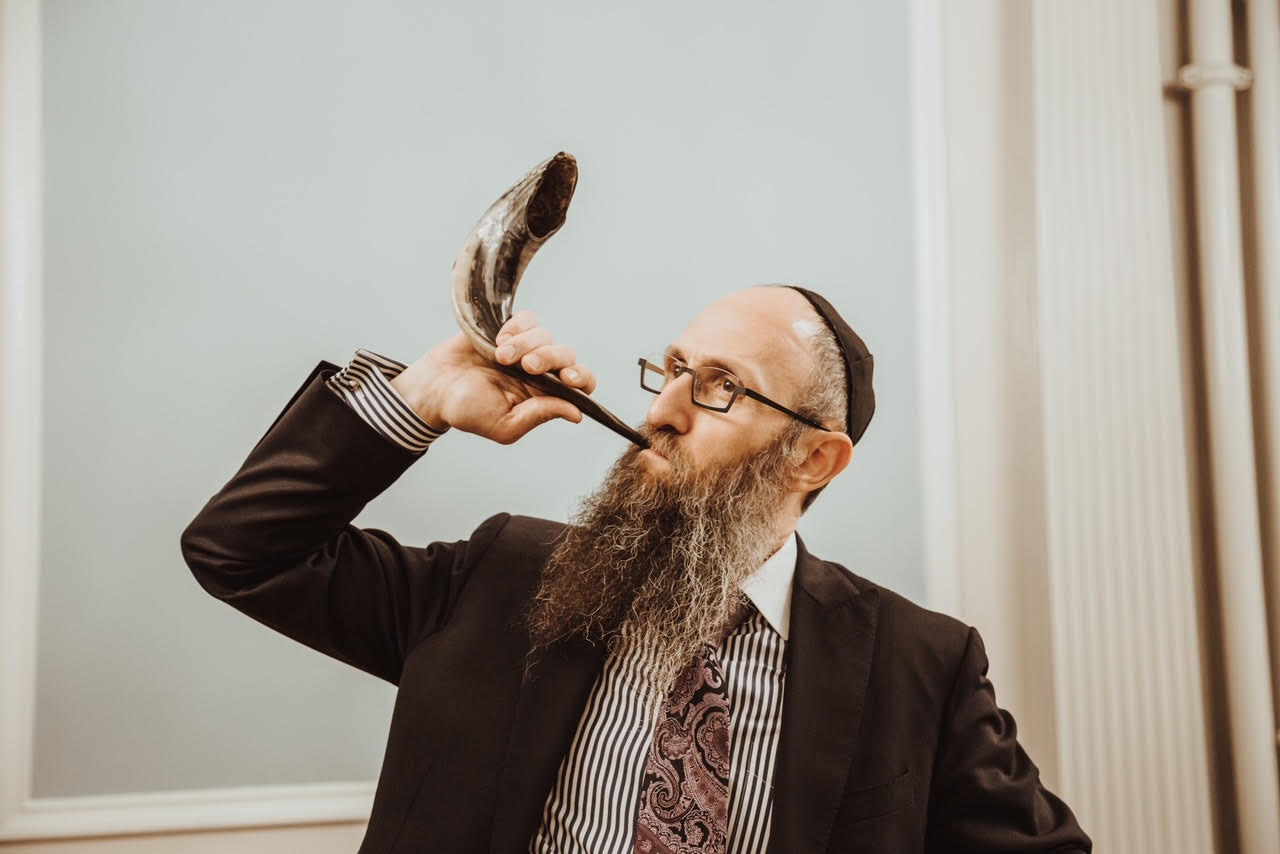

Raskin holds regular weekly classes, open to the entire community. These classes include: a Monday evening lecture series devoted to topics ranging from Pirkei Avot ("Ethics of the Fathers") to kabbalah; a Wednesday morning women's Weekly Torah portion class; a Wednesday afternoon class geared toward male professionals given at private offices near Brooklyn Borough Hall, as well as lecture sessions in Tanya, Mishneh Torah, and Talmud held in the early morning and late afternoon of every Shabbat (Jewish Sabbath). His weekly classes can also be attended through Zoom since 2020.

=== Mikveh ===
Raskin built a state-of-the-art mikveh (ritual bath) in B'nai Avraham, based on the Lubavitcher Rebbe's philosophy that mikvehs should be aesthetically pleasing. The mikveh, located in the basement of the Remsen Street building, has the atmosphere of a mini spa, though all the requirements of halakhah (Jewish law) are fulfilled in its design. In October 2011, Oprah Winfrey, wearing an austere, cape-like dress in dark colors, took a tour of the mikveh for a segment on the daily life of Hasidic Jews for her television series, "Oprah's Next Chapter," which aired on the Oprah Winfrey Network. Reporting on the visit, The New York Post called her "Shul Girl Oprah."

=== Hanukkah menorah ===
Every Hanukkah, Raskin oversees the placement of a giant 32-foot menorah in front of Brooklyn's Supreme Court building on Cadman Plaza, and lights it reciting the traditional blessings. Local energy provider Consolidated Edison provides a bucket truck to facilitate the nightly lighting ceremony. The menorah has since been designated Brooklyn's Official Menorah by Brooklyn Borough President Marty Markowitz. New York Mayor Michael Bloomberg accompanied Raskin in lighting the menorah in 2011.

Raskin serves as dean of Brooklyn Heights Jewish Academy, which opened in the fall of 2015. He received a dayonis judgeship from Rabbi Zalman Nechemia Goldberg and Rabbi Yohoram Ulman in 2017.

== Conversion and non-Jews ==
Raskin was involved for many years in conversions to Judaism, particularly at the start of his career. He continues to offer classes geared toward baal teshuvas (returnees to Judaism) and potential converts.

Raskin is a strong proponent of involving non-Jews in learning and following the Seven Laws of Noah ("Noahide Laws"). He adheres to the tenets of respecting the concepts of the Righteous Gentile, and maintains friendly relations with Brooklyn Heights' secular communities. As Raskin sees it, non-Jews can, and do, play a role in the life of his synagogue's community, a policy that is unusual in Orthodox and Hasidic Jewish circles. Among the most visible are Domenico Lepore, an Italian, and his British-born wife, Angela Montgomery, who have studied extensively with Raskin on the topic of corporate management techniques; Lepore has forged a Talmudic and Torah-based approach to problem solving with Raskin's help. At Raskin's invitation, Lepore presented a lecture on this topic alongside a panel of rabbis and scholars at Brooklyn's Borough Hall on the occasion of the Lubavitcher Rebbe's yahrtzeit (death anniversary) in 2011.

== Public relations ==
Raskin is known by local journalists and public relations people as a quotable source of information about Jewish law, who can speak to the Orthodox Jewish lifestyle in secular, pop-cultural contexts and outlets.

Raskin was featured in the February 2006 issue of National Geographic magazine about the Chabad Lubavitch movement, with a large photo of Raskin and his wife instructing a new female congregant in the recitation of blessings over the Sukkot festival's Lulav and Etrog (palm frond and citron) as they stood in a high wind on the Brooklyn Promenade at the beginning of the article. In October 2011, Raskin commented for ABC News' Good Morning America program about the alleged infidelity existing between Ashton Kutcher and Demi Moore, both of whom had been documented attendees and students at the Los Angeles Kabbalah Centre.

In an interior Chabad ranking, Raskin was listed as top "rising rabbi" in the United States, and fourth globally.

=== Technology and Social Media ===
Raskin, who as a Chabad rabbi feels comfortable with new media, began recording his Monday night lectures at B'nai Avraham on video in 2010. There are a large number of these lectures archived online, and pdf-format documents of materials that were distributed to in-person participants to the lectures are available on the site for download. A number of instructional videos and interviews with Raskin can be found on YouTube. Likewise, he maintains a presence on both Facebook and Twitter and has over 500 classes online.

B'nai Avraham has a dedicated website that offers various study resources (mainly on the weekly Torah portion).

== Family ==
Raskin is married to Shternie, who directs the Gan Menachem-Kiddie Korner preschool. They and their six children live in Brooklyn Heights.

== Works ==
Raskin has had seven books published to date, and they have been translated into Spanish, Portuguese, German, Polish, and now being translated into Hebrew. His latest book is Simanim, Parsha Mnemonics: Decoding the Number of Verses in the Torah Portion, published January 1, 2022. It explores the connection between the mnemonic, the number of pesukim and the theme of the parshah. Currently he is working on A Daily Guide for a More Meaningful Life, which includes business ethics and charity.

Other books published include the following:

On March 8, 2020, Parsha Mnemonics was published, and it is available on Amazon.com.

In March 2017, Thank You, G-d for Making Me a Woman, now also available on Kindle through Amazon.com. This book aims to show that it is a mistaken belief that Judaism values the male contribution to its daily liturgy and life more than the female. In a clear and compassionate style, it lays out traditional observance and new scholarship with simple language. Ultimately, the Jewish woman's role as ubiquitous force in daily life becomes clear: her power is subtle, mystical, transformative. Her role isn't marginal, it's essential.

In 2013, Sichos in English (an imprint of the Lubavitch movement) published his book, Guardian of Israel: Miracle Stories of Tefillin and Mezuzah. It focuses on two of the Lubavitcher Rebbe's favorite Mitzvah ("commandment") campaigns: for Jews to place a mezuzah on their doorpost; and the mitzvah incumbent upon Jewish males to don tefillin (phylacteries) daily. Raskin is convinced of the 'miraculous' nature of these observances, and compiled human interest stories from across the globe that relate what people feel might be confluences and personal revelations associated with them.

In March 2011 Sichos in English published Raskin's By Divine Design: The Kabbalah of Large, Small, and Missing Letters in the Parshah, where Raskin investigates the graphic design of the individual Hebrew letters as they appear in the weekly Torah portion. In a rather unusual approach, he dwells on anomalies and discrepancies he finds in the letters' size, shape, and contextual usage. He also peppers his reference material with time-worn Jewish jokes that he uses in his sermons.

He co-authored The Rabbi & the CEO in 2008 with Swiss corporate management consultant Thomas Zweifel (Select Books, publisher), giving advice to corporate professionals on how to use the tenets of the Jewish Torah in the secular environment of their respective businesses. This book is also available in German, Russian and Polish.

Raskin authored Letters of Light in 2004 (also published with Sichos in English), in which each chapter is devoted to a discussion of a single letter of the Hebrew alphabet (22 letters in all). Many of Raskin's books have also been translated into Spanish, German, and Portuguese.

Over 500 of Raskin's weekly lectures on various Jewish topics are broadcast online at Chabad.org, YouTube and Spotify.
