= Lee Robson =

Australian rules footballer

Personal information
- Full name: Lee Robson
- Original team: Central Whyalla (WFL)

Playing career^{1}
Years	Club	Games (Goals)
1979-1990	West Torrens (SANFL)	228 (81)
Total		228 (81)

Representative team honours
Years	Team	Games (Goals)
1984	South Australia	2
- ^{1} Playing statistics correct to the end of 1990.

Career highlights
- West Torrens Life Member 1989; SANFL Life Member 1990

Lee Robson is a former Australian rules footballer who played for West Torrens in the South Australian National Football League (SANFL).
