= Shea Hecht =

American chabad rabbi

Shea Hecht is an American Chabad rabbi, writer and radio broadcaster. He serves as chairman of the board of the National Committee for the Furtherance of Jewish Education.

Hecht is a vocal supporter of political candidates. According to The Guardian, he has influence over as many as 200,000 voters in any given election.

== Biography ==
Shea Hecht was born in Brooklyn, New York to Jacob J. Hecht, one of the closest confidants of Lubavitcher Rebbe Menachem Mendel Schneerson, and Chave Hecht. Hecht is one of twelve children, and a fifth generation New Yorker. He was educated in the Lubavitch Yeshiva Central School System, where he received his semikhah (rabbinic ordination).

Hecht rose to prominence in the 1970s after he began a program that sought to remove and educate Jewish youths away from various cults. This inspired his autobiography, Confessions of a Jewish Cult Buster.

As a community leader during the violent Crown Heights riot in 1991, Hecht worked across racial barriers in the pursuit of a harmonious side-by-side existence between the Hasidic and African-American communities. Along with Edison Jackson, he co-chaired the Crown Heights Coalition after its inception. For his leadership and service during the riots, he received the Buffalo Soldier Award.

Hecht was appointed by New York City Mayor Rudy Giuliani as Commissioner of Human Rights. and as member of the Police Task Force Committee. In 1998, Giuliani appointed Hecht to the Committee for Proper Art in New York City.

Hecht is a dean at Hadar Hatorah Yeshiva in Brooklyn, a yeshiva dedicated to fostering the Baal Teshuvah movement, as well as a faculty member of the Ivy League Torah Study Program. He also served as the spiritual leader of the Seaview Jewish Center in Canarsie, Brooklyn.

== Radio and press ==
After his father died, Hecht assumed the role of host of the "Shema Yisroel" radio program, a weekly one-hour show broadcast on WEVD in New York that focused on religion. Hecht was also featured as host alongside Felipe Luciano on the afternoon drive show on WWRL, and later moved to the morning drive show alongside Karen Hunter. He currently hosts the Dov Hikind show once a month on Saturday night.

Hecht writes a weekly column that has been printed in many newspapers across the world such as The Jerusalem Post, The Jewish Press, GOP USA, and Israel National News.

On May 4, 2014, Hecht started a new family advice call in show for Israel National Radio, the online radio station of Arutz Sheva.

== Don King ==
Hecht is known as Don King's rabbi. As a result of their friendship, King donated one million dollars to the National Committee for the Furtherance of Jewish Education, an organization that Hecht serves as chairman of the board. Hecht was seen publicly at King's trial in New York City. King also marched alongside Hecht in Crown Heights to further Jewish and Black relations.

== Politics ==
As the son of J.J. Hecht, he was born into the political arena. Hecht regularly endorses and backs candidates for office, even though Chabad rabbis generally do not do so. Hecht has explained that the reason that he does this is because the Rebbe gave his father special dispensation to endorse candidates for office.

Hecht has been known to sway elections by giving candidates his support. Most notably, in 1998 he backed Chuck Schumer instead of longtime incumbent Al D'Amato, acknowledging Schumer's help during the 1991 Crown Heights riot. Hecht backed Rudy Giuliani for his run for mayor of the City of New York in his first try at mayor in 1989. He was the first Jewish leader to publicly back Scott Stringer for City Comptroller against former Governor Eliot Spitzer. He has written many op-eds over the course of his career supporting many candidates running for office. According to The Guardian, Hecht has influence over as many as 200,000 voters in any given election. He is a strong supporter of school vouchers.

== Family ==
Hecht is married to Baila (née Sufrin), the daughter of A.D. Sufrin from London. Together they have ten children. His eldest son Yitchok Hecht is a director of Chabad of Ulster County, New York. His son Levi Hecht is a real estate developer in New York; he was named one of the "People to Watch" in the Hudson Valley in 2005. His son Rabbi Hanoch Hecht, also known as the 6 Minute Rabbi (for his quick, inspiring Torah lessons) is the director of Chabad of Dutchess County and the spiritual leader of the Rhinebeck Jewish Center in Rhinebeck, New York.

== Controversies ==
Hecht claims to be one of the pioneers in the Hasidic community of bringing child abuse to the forefront.

Hecht's perspectives on sex-abuse have come under attack. In an article from the Tablet Magazine, Hecht maintains that rabbis should be granted the discretion to determine whether victims are lying before getting involved in a case of accused molestation. "The last time I remembered, I was ordained as a rabbi", said Hecht. "If the person [victim] came to me, I have at least the responsibility to decide if it’s true or not true, because they want guidance."
