= Yisroel Jacobson =

Chabad Hasidic rabbi

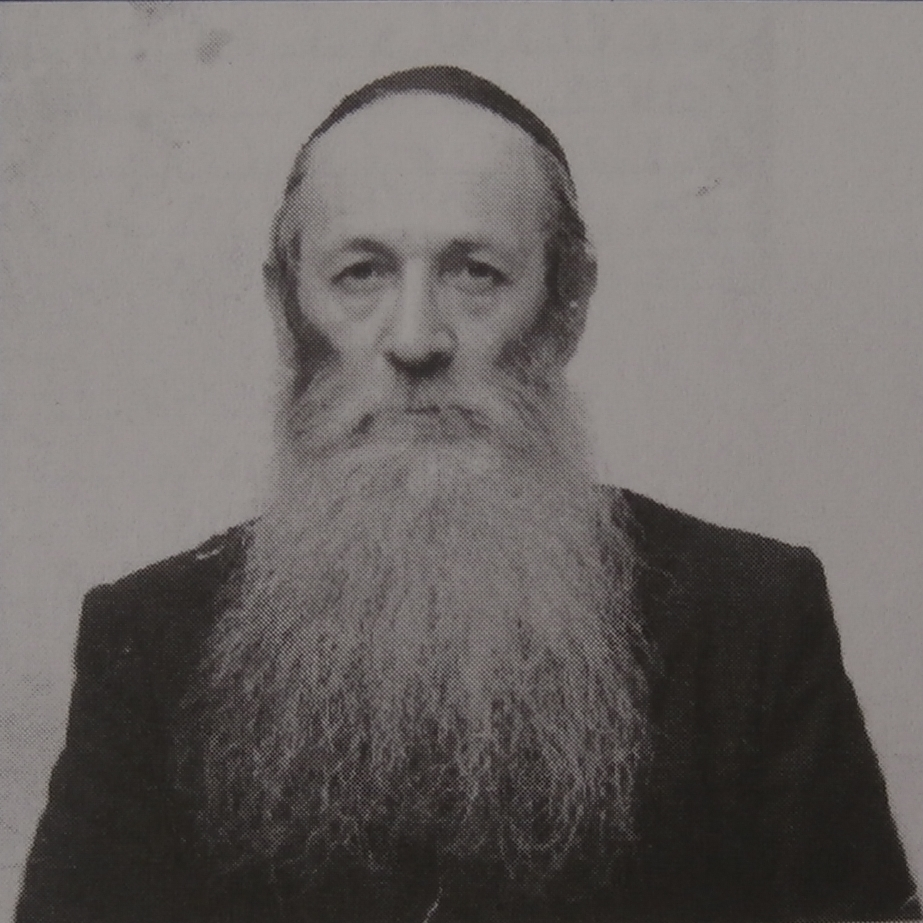
Jacobson

Yisroel Jacobson (or Israel Jacobson) (1895-1975) was a Chabad Hasidic rabbi and the representative of the sixth Chabad rebbe, Yosef Yitzchak Schneersohn, to the United States during the 1920s and 1930s. He was one of the first Lubavitcher activists to arrive in to the United States. He was born in Russia and migrated to the United States in 1925.

== Biography ==
Jacobson was born in Zurowitz, Belarus, on 20 November 1895 and died on 27 May 1975 at the age of 79.

=== Before World War Two ===
Jacobson moved from Poland to New York in 1925 to help Chabad Hasidim emigrate to the United States. He became a rabbi and teacher and became active in fundraising activities, sending the funds to Schneersohn in Eastern Europe, supporting Chabad activities and enabling Schneersohn to leave Russia.

Jacobson was the rabbi in the Anshei Bobroisk synagogue in Brownsville, Brooklyn. He founded Yeshivas Achei T’mimim in New York in 1932 for young men.

=== During World War Two ===
After the start of World War II, Jacobson arranged for Schneersohn and his family to leave Poland. After Schneersohn's secured passage from Nazi-occupied Poland to Riga, Latvia, Jacobson interceded unsuccessfully with the American consul in Berlin to secure Schneersohn's library of books and manuscripts in Otwock, Poland. Subsequent attempts to secure the library were made after the war.

=== After World War Two ===
Following the death of Schneersohn in 1950, Jacobson became an early supporter of Menachem Mendel Schneerson (who was not yet leader of Chabad) backing him over his brother-in-law Shemaryahu Gurary.

Jacobson served on the faculty of the central Lubavitch yeshiva at 770 Eastern Parkway. He also helped found the Yeshiva Hadar Hatorah for baalei teshuvah ("returnees" to Judaism) where he served as dean. He was also the dean of the Beth Rivkah school for girls.

== Influence ==
Zalman Schachter-Shalomi, founder of the Jewish Renewal movement, described Jacobson as "my mashpia" (spiritual mentor) and cites his teachings in his memoir.
