= Thomas Zweifel =

Swiss-American author (born 1962)

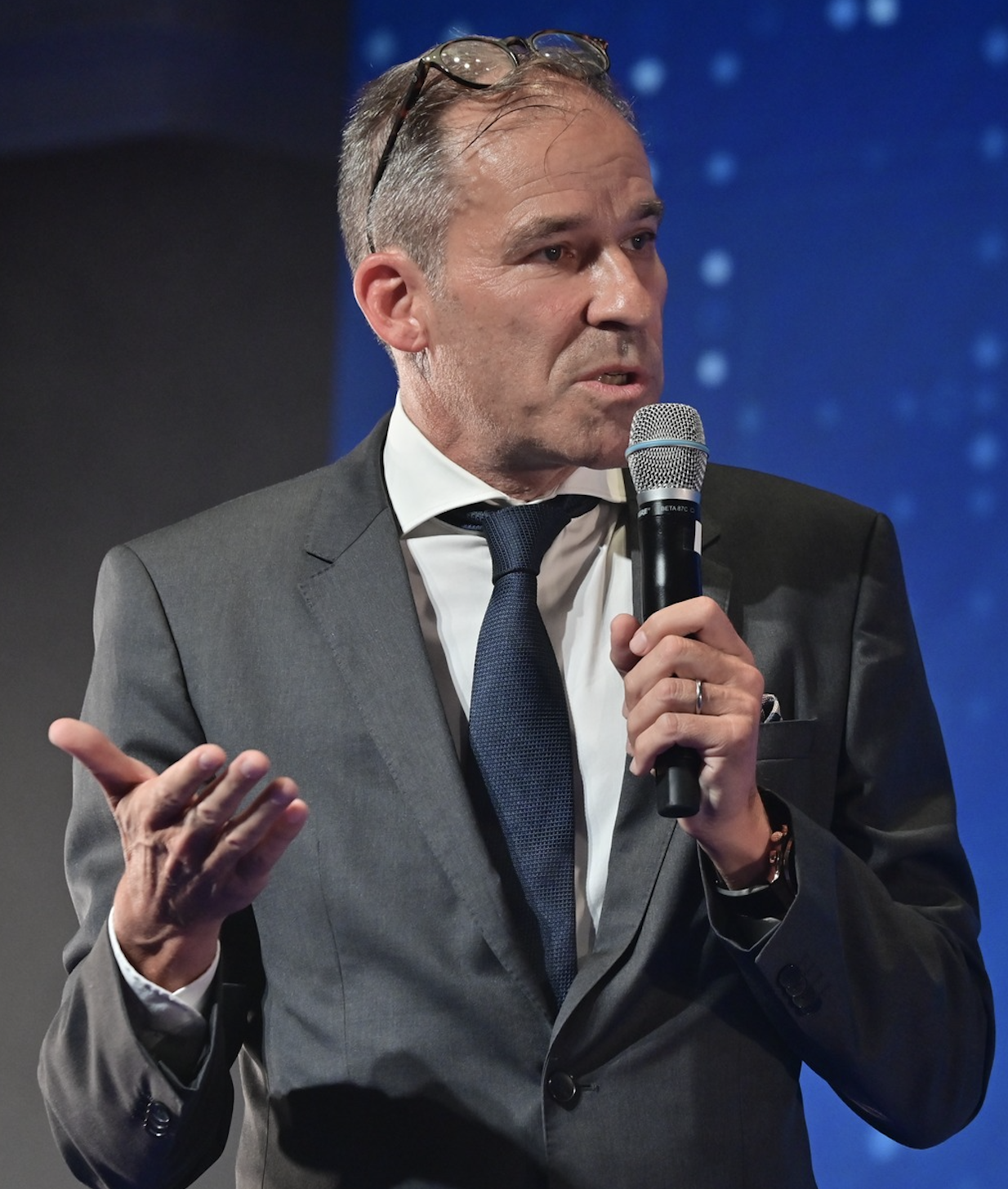
- Zweifel in 2022
- Born: Thomas David Zweifel; January 7, 1962 (age 64); Paris
- Spouse: Gabrielle Zweifel-Wurmser (1968-)

Academic background
- Education: Columbia University, New York University
- Thesis: “Democratic Deficit? Institutions and Regulation in the European Union, Switzerland and the United States”

Academic work
- Institutions: Columbia University; University of St. Gallen
- Main interests: Strategy, Leadership, Performance, Communication, Cross-Cultural, AI Management
- Website: https://thomaszweifel.com

Thomas David Zweifel is a Swiss-American ex-CEO, university professor and author known for his theories Strategy-in-Action, the Global Leader Pyramid, and the Matterhorn of Masterful Listening.

== Career ==
From 1985 to 1997, Zweifel worked for the non-governmental organization The Hunger Project on the roster of the United Nations Economic and Social Council (ECOSOC). As its Director of Global Operations (from 1992 to 1997), he lived in various European countries as well as in Japan, India, and the United States. He was responsible for the profitability of 27 Global Affiliates but did not have the legal power to manage them through command-and-control. So he learned the skill of coaching in action. Under his leadership, annual revenues grew by 45% compound growth while holding expenses stable.

In 1997, Zweifel became co-founder and CEO of Swiss Consulting Group, a management consulting firm that he sold in 2013. Since then, he has worked independently as a management consultant for strategy and performance. He has worked with Fortune 500 companies, the United States Military Academy at West Point, the United States Air Force Academy, the United States Department of State, the Swiss Federal Office of Public Health and Federal Department of Foreign Affairs, the Government of Haiti, and the Government of Kazakhstan's prime minister and cabinet.

Between 2001 and 2013, Zweifel worked with the United Nations Development Programme on capacity-building in developing countries, as well as with the German soccer club 1. FC Saarbrücken on its strategy.

== Strategy and Leadership Methodologies ==
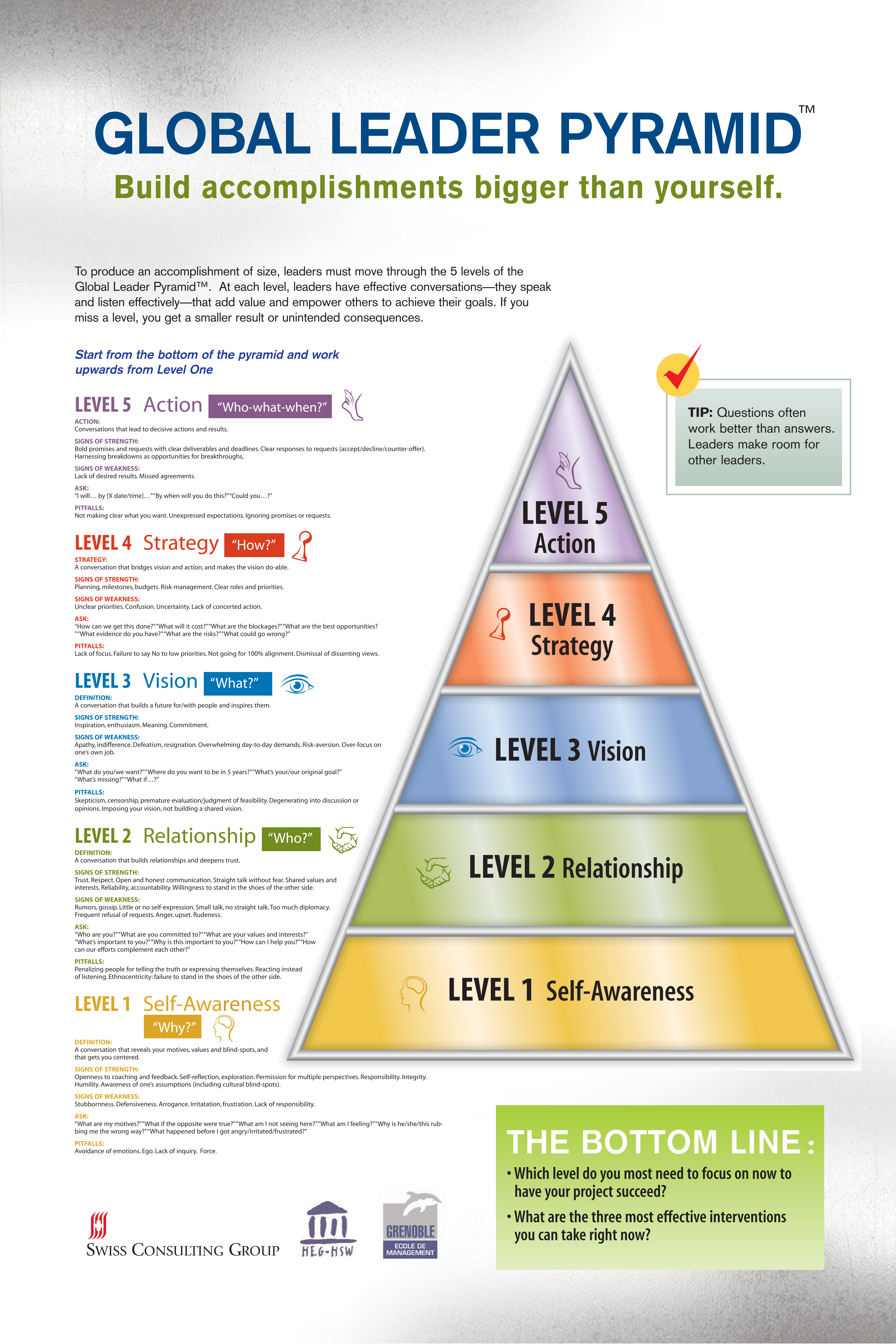
The Global Leader Pyramid, Copyright © 2006 Thomas D. Zweifel. To lead effectively, a leader needs to master five conversational levels: self-awareness, relationship, vision, strategy, and action.

Zweifel developed several strategy and leadership methodologies, such as Strategy-In-Action, the Global Leader Pyramid and the Matterhorn of Masterful Listening.

The theoretical foundation of the Global Leader Pyramid™ is Radical Constructivism: Leadership is understood as the product of specific conversations. To achieve organizational objectives, leaders must progress through the five levels of the Global Leader Pyramid: Self-Awareness, Relationship, Vision, Strategy, and Action. At each level, leaders conduct effective conversations (they speak and listen effectively) that create value and empower others to achieve their goals. Missing a level leads to a diminished outcome or unintended consequences.

== Academics ==
In 1996, Zweifel earned a master's degree from the School of International and Public Affairs at Columbia University.

In 2001, he earned a PhD in International Political Economy from New York University with a thesis on the democratic deficiencies of the European Union, particularly in the regulation of corporate mergers.

Zweifel has also taught as an adjunct professor at Columbia University since 2001, and as a guest professor at the University of St. Gallen since 2004.

== Publications ==
- 2002: Democratic Deficit? Institutions and Regulation in the European Union, Switzerland, and the United States (Rowman & Littlefield), ISBN 978-0-7391-0812-3
- 2003: Communicate or Die: Getting Results Through Speaking and Listening (SelectBooks), ISBN 1-59079-000-6
- 2003: Culture Clash: Managing the Global High-Performance Team (SelectBooks), ISBN 978-1590799611
- 2005: International Organizations: Democracy, Accountability, Power (Lynne Rienner Publishers), ISBN 978-1-58826-392-6.
- 2008: (with Aaron L. Raskin) The Rabbi and the CEO: The Ten Commandments for 21st Century Leaders (Select Books), ISBN 1-59079-150-9
- 2010: Leadership in 100 Days: A Systematic Self-Coaching Workbook (iHorizon), ISBN 978-1091667433
- 2014: Strategy-In-Action: Marrying Planning, People and Performance, New York: iHorizon, ISBN 978-1491031100
- 2019: iCoach: The Simple Little Formula for Freeing Yourself, Boosting People Power and Changing the World, New York: iHorizon, ISBN 978-1687492944
- 2022: (with Vip Vyas) Gorilla in the Cockpit: Breaking the Hidden Patterns of Project Failure and the System for Success, New York: iHorizon, ISBN 979-8359079228
- 2023: Anti-Crash: The 5-Part System for De-Risking and Winning in a VUCA World. New York: iHorizon, ISBN 979-8870377582
- 2024: Lead: Mobilizing People to Get Big Things Done. Copenhagen: Bookboon, ISBN 978-87-403-4885-9
