= Frank Asling =

Australian rules footballer

Personal information
- Full name: Leslie Frank Asling
- Born: 7 March 1912; Berwick, Victoria
- Died: 16 August 1990 (aged 78); Narre Warren, Victoria
- Original team: Belgrave
- Height: 183 cm (6 ft 0 in)
- Weight: 84 kg (185 lb)

Playing career^{1}
Years	Club	Games (Goals)
1934	Collingwood	5 (1)
1935	Essendon	7 (0)
1936	Hawthorn	2 (1)
Total		14 (2)
- ^{1} Playing statistics correct to the end of 1936.

Leslie Frank Asling (7 March 1912 – 16 August 1990) was an Australian rules footballer who played with Collingwood, Essendon and Hawthorn in the Victorian Football League (VFL).

Asling attended Dandenong High School and initially played football for Berwick, where he was halfback and follower. He transferred to Belgrave in 1932 and then in the 1934 season played four games for the Collingwood seconds before being promoted to the seniors where he played five games that year. After failing to make Collingwood's list in 1935, Asling moved to Essendon and made seven appearances for them that year. After again failing to make a list in his second year, in 1936 Asling transferred to Hawthorn where he made two senior appearances. In 1937 he returned to Belgrave.

Asling served in both the Australian Army and the Royal Australian Air Force during World War II.
