= Jack Hubbert =

Australian rules footballer, born 1916

Personal information
- Full name: Jack Hubbert
- Born: 19 March 1916
- Died: 5 August 1990 (aged 74)

Playing career^{1}
Years	Club	Games (Goals)
1937	Essendon	2 (1)
- ^{1} Playing statistics correct to the end of 1937.

Jack Hubbert (19 March 1916 – 5 August 1990) was an Australian rules footballer who played with Essendon in the Victorian Football League (VFL).
