= Frank Hindman Golay =

American economist

Frank Hindman Golay (July 2, 1915 – August 31, 1990) was an American economist.

== Biography ==
Golay was born in Windsor, Missouri, on July 2, 1915, and served in the United States Navy during World War II. After his military service, Golay obtained a doctorate in economics from the University of Chicago in 1951, and worked for the Federal Reserve Board until 1953, when he joined the Cornell University as an assistant professor of economics and Asian studies. In 1960, Golay received a Guggenheim fellowship. He was named chair of the Cornell Department of Economics in 1963, and left the position in 1967. He taught at SOAS, University of London as a visiting professor on a Fulbright grant from 1965 to 1966. Between 1970 and 1976, Golay led the Cornell Southeast Asia Program. Golay was a visiting professor at the University of the Philippines from 1973 to 1974 as a recipient of a Rockefeller Foundation grant. He retired from Cornell in 1981, and served as president of the Association for Asian Studies in 1985. Golay died on August 31, 1990, at the veterans' hospital in Oxford, New York.

He was awarded an honorary L.L.D. degree by Aterneo de Manila University in 1966, and he received fellowships from Henry Luce foundation, Social Science Research Council, National Endowment for the Humanities, and Fulbright Program.
