= Hadar Hatorah =

Chabad school in New York City, U.S.

- Yeshiva Kol Yaakov Yehuda Hadar Hatorah Rabbinical Seminary
- Formation: 1962
- Founder: Rabbi Yisroel Jacobson
- Parent organization: National Committee for the Furtherance of Jewish Education
- Website: https://www.hadarhatorah.org/

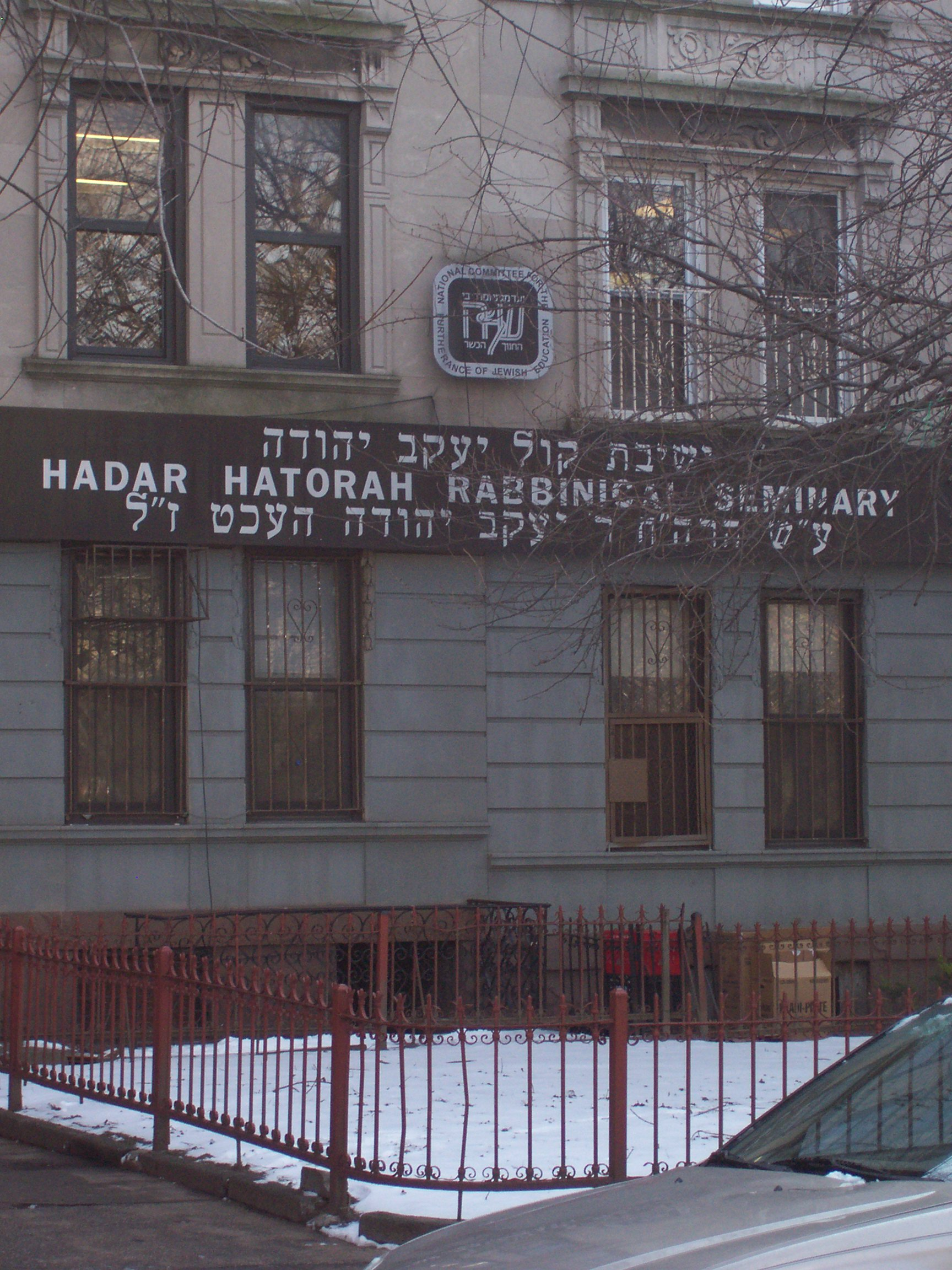
Yeshiva Hadar Hatorah on Eastern Parkway in Crown Heights, Brooklyn

Hadar Hatorah (full name: Yeshiva Kol Yaakov Yehuda Hadar Hatorah Rabbinical Seminary) is a Chabad men's yeshiva in Brooklyn, New York. It is the world's first yeshiva for baalei teshuva.

== History ==
The yeshiva, located at 824 Eastern Parkway, Brooklyn, New York 11213, was founded in 1962 by Rabbi Yisroel Jacobson, a Chabad activist, to accommodate baalei teshuva interested in full-time study in a traditional yeshiva environment. It has been located in the Chabad-Lubavitch Hasidic community in the multi-ethnic neighborhood of Crown Heights in Brooklyn, New York since inception. The yeshiva was first located within the Chabad world headquarters building at 770 Eastern Parkway before moving to its present location at 824 Eastern Parkway following growing enrolment.

The yeshiva is a branch of the National Committee for the Furtherance of Jewish Education (NCFJE). Rabbi Jacob J. Hecht, executive vice president and national director of the NCFJE, played a pivotal role in the yeshiva's development and was its dean. After his death the yeshiva was renamed as Yeshivas Kol Yaakov Yehudah - Hadar Hatorah Rabbinical Seminary in recognition of his efforts.

The yeshiva curriculum includes Torah study, prayer, Jewish law, Hasidic teachings and Jewish values. Some of the courses are academically recognized and can be transferred to colleges for credits.

The school accommodates students of all backgrounds, and with affiliation to all Jewish movements.

== Faculty ==
- Rosh Yeshiva: Rabbi Yaakov Goldberg.
- Mashpia: Rabbi Yosef Boruch Wircberg.
- Mashgiach: Rabbi Yankl Osdoba.

== Notable alumni ==
- Rabbi Yishaya Rose
- Abe Saks
- Matisyahu
- Rabbi Leible Morrison

== See also ==
- Baal teshuva
- Jewish fundamentalism
- Orthodox Judaism outreach
