= Leo Bird =

Australian rules footballer, born 1908

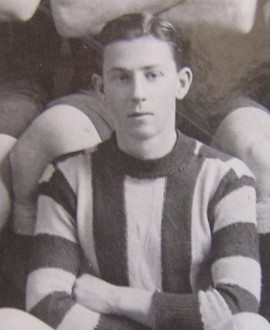
- Bird during his Collingwood career

Personal information
- Full name: Leo James Bird
- Born: 17 September 1908; Collingwood, Victoria
- Died: 6 August 1990 (aged 81)
- Original team: Collingwood District
- Height: 170 cm (5 ft 7 in)
- Weight: 66 kg (146 lb)

Playing career^{1}
| Years | Club | Games (Goals) |
| 1929–30 | Collingwood | 16 (10) |
| 1931 | Fitzroy | 8 (2) |
| Total | | 24 (12) |
- ^{1} Playing statistics correct to the end of 1931.

Leo James Bird (17 September 1908 – 6 August 1990) was an Australian rules footballer who played with Collingwood and Fitzroy in the Victorian Football League (VFL).
