= Antonio Argilés =

Spanish footballer (1931–1990)

Personal information
- Full name: Antonio Argilés Antón
- Date of birth: 31 December 1931
- Place of birth: Terrassa, Spain
- Date of death: 21 August 1990 (aged 58)
- Place of death: Terrassa, Spain
- Position: Defender

Youth career
- 1946–1949: Terrassa

Senior career*
Years	Team	Apps	(Gls)
1949–1950	Terrassa		
1950–1964	Espanyol	301	(2)

International career
1953–1956	Spain B	5	(0)

Managerial career
- 1965: Manresa
- 1965–1967: Badalona
- 1967–1968: Sant Andreu
- 1968–1969: Espanyol
- Tarragona
- Badalona
- Europa
- Hospitalet
- Bufalà
- * Club domestic league appearances and goals

Antonio Argilés Antón (31 December 1931 – 21 August 1990) was a Spanish footballer. He played for RCD Espanyol during all his career, and he is still the most used player at Espanyol with 301 La Liga games.

Born in Terrassa, Argilés began playing football in the youth system of local side Terrassa FC. In October 1950, he joined RCD Espanyol where he would play as a right-wing defender. Argilés was a fixture in Espanyol's lineup from his debut, featuring for the club in the 1957 Copa del Generalísimo Final. He left the club after it was relegated at the end of the 1961–62 La Liga season. Argilés re-joined Espanyol for the 1963–64 La Liga season, which would be his last year playing professional football.

After he retired from playing, Argilés became a football coach. He managed Espanyol, CF Badalona, Gimnàstic de Tarragona, CE Europa, CE L'Hospitalet and Bufalà.
