= Harry Bulpit =

Australian rules footballer

Personal information
- Full name: Harold Bulpit
- Born: 7 April 1895; Carlton, Victoria
- Died: 8 August 1990 (aged 95)
- Original team: Port Melbourne CYMS (CYMSFA)
- Height: 164 cm (5 ft 5 in)
- Weight: 63 kg (139 lb)

Playing career^{1}
| Years | Club | Games (Goals) |
| 1918–19 | South Melbourne | 6 (3) |
- ^{1} Playing statistics correct to the end of 1919.

Harry Bulpit (7 April 1895 – 8 August 1990) was an Australian rules footballer who played with South Melbourne in the Victorian Football League (VFL).
