= Kazimierz Kaszuba =

Polish footballer (1930–1990)

Personal information
- Full name: Kazimierz Józef Kaszuba
- Date of birth: 5 April 1930
- Place of birth: Rząska, Poland
- Date of death: 5 August 1990 (aged 60)
- Place of death: Kraków, Poland
- Height: 1.79 m (5 ft 10 in)
- Positions: Defender; midfielder

Senior career*
Years	Team	Apps	(Gls)
1948–1951	Cracovia		
1952–1953	Wawel Kraków		
1954	Cracovia		
1955–1962	Wawel Kraków		

International career
1951–1954	Poland	3	(0)
- * Club domestic league appearances and goals

Kazimierz Józef Kaszuba (5 April 1930 – 5 August 1990) was a Polish footballer who competed in the 1952 Summer Olympics.

== Honours ==
Cracovia

- Ekstraklasa: 1948
