= Paul Martin (Australian footballer) =

Australian rules footballer (1964–2019)

Personal information
- Full name: Paul Martin
- Born: 14 April 1964; England
- Died: 30 March 2019 (aged 54)
- Original team: Christies Beach (SFL)
- Position: Wing

Playing career^{1}
Years	Club	Games (Goals)
1982-1986	South Adelaide (SANFL)	109 (73)
- ^{1} Playing statistics correct to the end of 1986.

Paul Martin (14 April 1964 - 30 March 2019) was an Australian rules footballer who played with South Adelaide in the South Australian National Football League (SANFL). He won the David Kantilla Memorial Trophy (Best First Year Player) in 1982, and the following year was selected in the Advertiser Team of the Year.
