= Óscar Coll =

Argentine footballer (1928–2001)

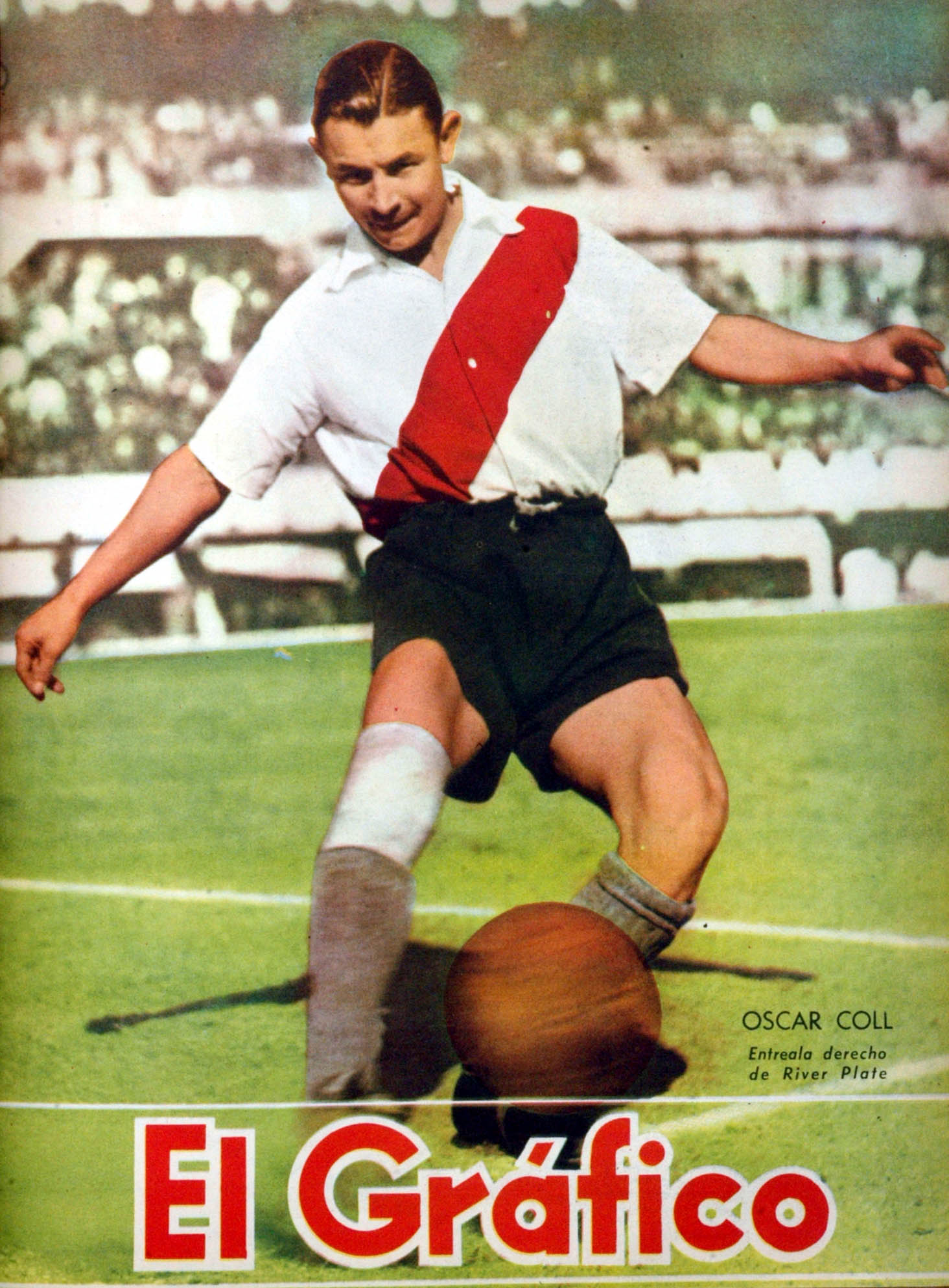
- Oscar Coll (River)

Personal information
- Full name: Óscar Coll Marengo
- Date of birth: September 1, 1928
- Place of birth: Buenos Aires, Argentina
- Date of death: 2001
- Position: Forward

Senior career*
Years	Team	Apps	(Gls)
1948-1950	River Plate	24	(7)
1951-1953	Platense	83	(50)
1954-1955	San Lorenzo	45	(17)
1956-1961	Espanyol	91	(36)
1962-1966	Universidad de Chile	72	(31)
Total		315	(141)
- * Club domestic league appearances and goals

Óscar Coll Marengo (September 1, 1928, in Buenos Aires, Argentina – 2001) was an Argentine footballer who played as a forward for clubs of Argentina, Chile and Spain.

== Career ==
Raised in Avellaneda, Coll was the youngest of seven children, and he and his two brothers would each become professional footballers. His oldest brother Andrés played for Club Atlético Independiente and Racing Club de Avellaneda, while Norberto played for River Plate and Union Espanola of Chile. Óscar began with Club Atlético River Plate's reserve team playing in the fourth division before joining the first team as a right-side attacker (an extremo derecha).

Next, Coll joined Club Atlético Platense for three seasons before San Lorenzo de Almagro for the 1954–55 season. He would move to Spain after that season, joining RCD Espanyol.

Coll died aged 73.

== Teams ==
- River Plate 1948–1950
- Platense 1951–1953
- San Lorenzo 1954–1955
- Espanyol 1956–1961
- Universidad de Chile 1962–1966

== Honours ==
Universidad de Chile

- Chilean Championship: 1962, 1964 and 1965
