= South Australia Australian rules football team =

Australian rules football representative team

South Australia
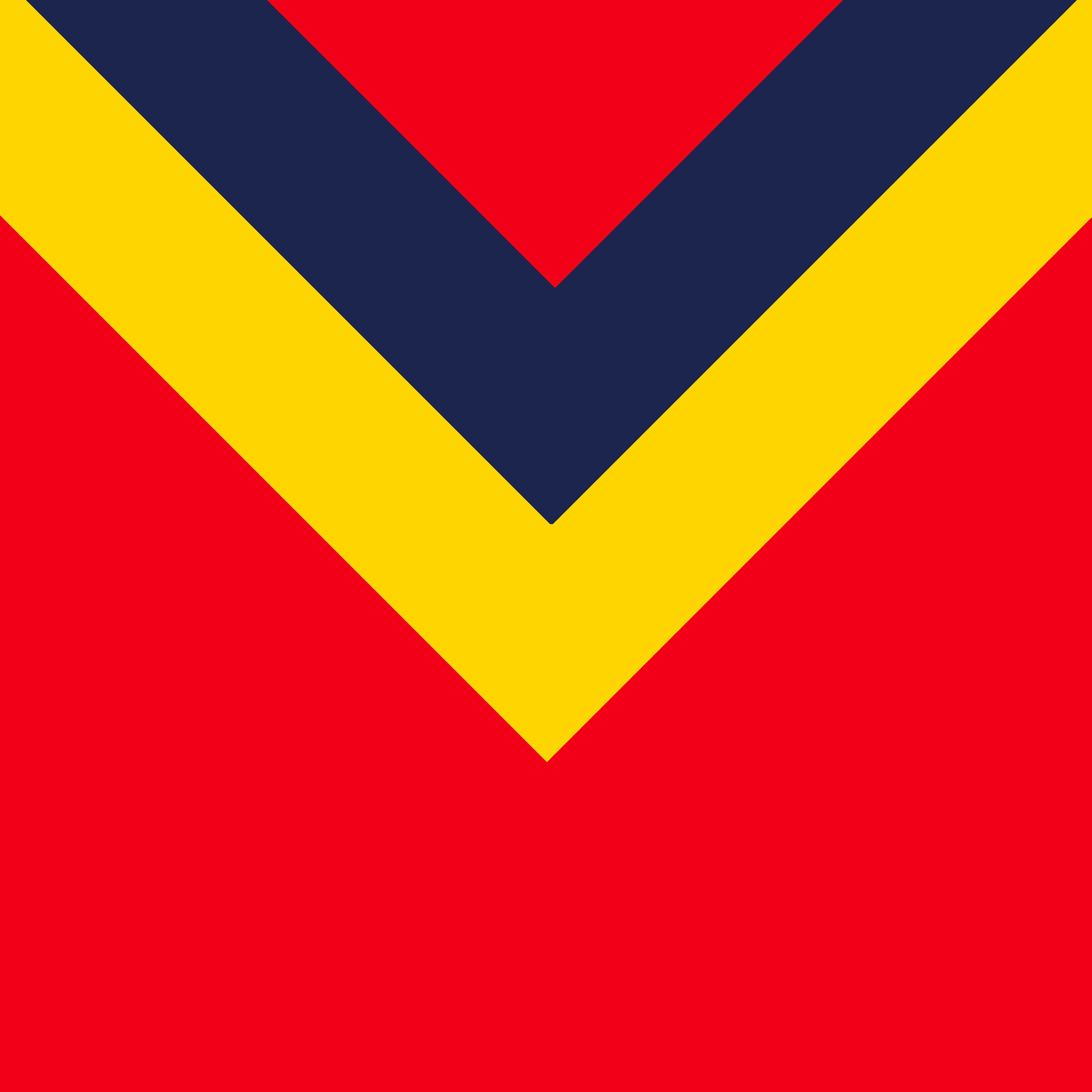

Team information
- Nickname: The Croweaters
- Governing body: South Australian National Football League
- Most caps: Lindsay Head (37)
- Home stadium: AAMI Stadium (51,515); Adelaide Oval (53,583); Various SANFL grounds
- First game
- (Victoria (state)) Victoria 7–0 South Australia; 1879

The South Australia state football team is the representative side of South Australia in the sport of Australian rules football.

South Australia has a proud history in interstate football, having a successful historical record. South Australia won the second National Football Carnival in 1911 and won two out of the four Interstate Carnivals in the State of Origin era, including the last two. The senior team returns in 2027 from a 28 year hiatus, it also contests the underage men's (5 division 1 titles) and underage women's championships (1 division 2 title).

South Australia has a long and intense rivalry with Victoria. The rivalry was characterised by the catchcry in South Australia called "Kick a Vic", and fans would bring signs of the cry to the games. The South Australia–Victoria rivalry was characterised by long-time South Australian player Andrew Jarman, who has said "it was the mother of all battles". Some of the games between South Australia, Victoria and Western Australia in the 1980s and 1990s have been described as "some of greatest games in the history of Australian football".

The rivalry with Victoria stems from before State of Origin started, when the standard rules prior to 1977 mandated that all VFL players must only play interstate football for Victoria. As most of the country's best players played in the VFL, Victoria dominated the pre–State of Origin era, it created a culture of disdain towards Victoria. Another component of the rivalry is a historical feeling in South Australia that Victoria doesn't rate any player or league outside Victoria. Another contributing factor is a feeling in South Australia that Victorians think they own the game.

== History ==
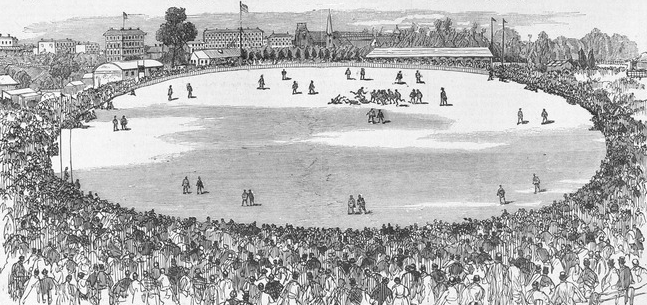
Victoria vs South Australia at the East Melbourne Cricket Ground in 1879

The first game South Australia played was in the first intercolonial/interstate game in 1878 against Victoria. South Australia has played several games annually from 1879 till when interstate football ended in 1999. South Australia has also participated in every Australian National Football Carnival and always participated in section 1 when there were divisions.

The 1980s was a golden period for South Australia, winning the national championship three times, including an Interstate Carnival Championship.

South Australia won the Interstate Carnival three times and came runner up another eight.

== Identity ==
=== Colours and Kit ===
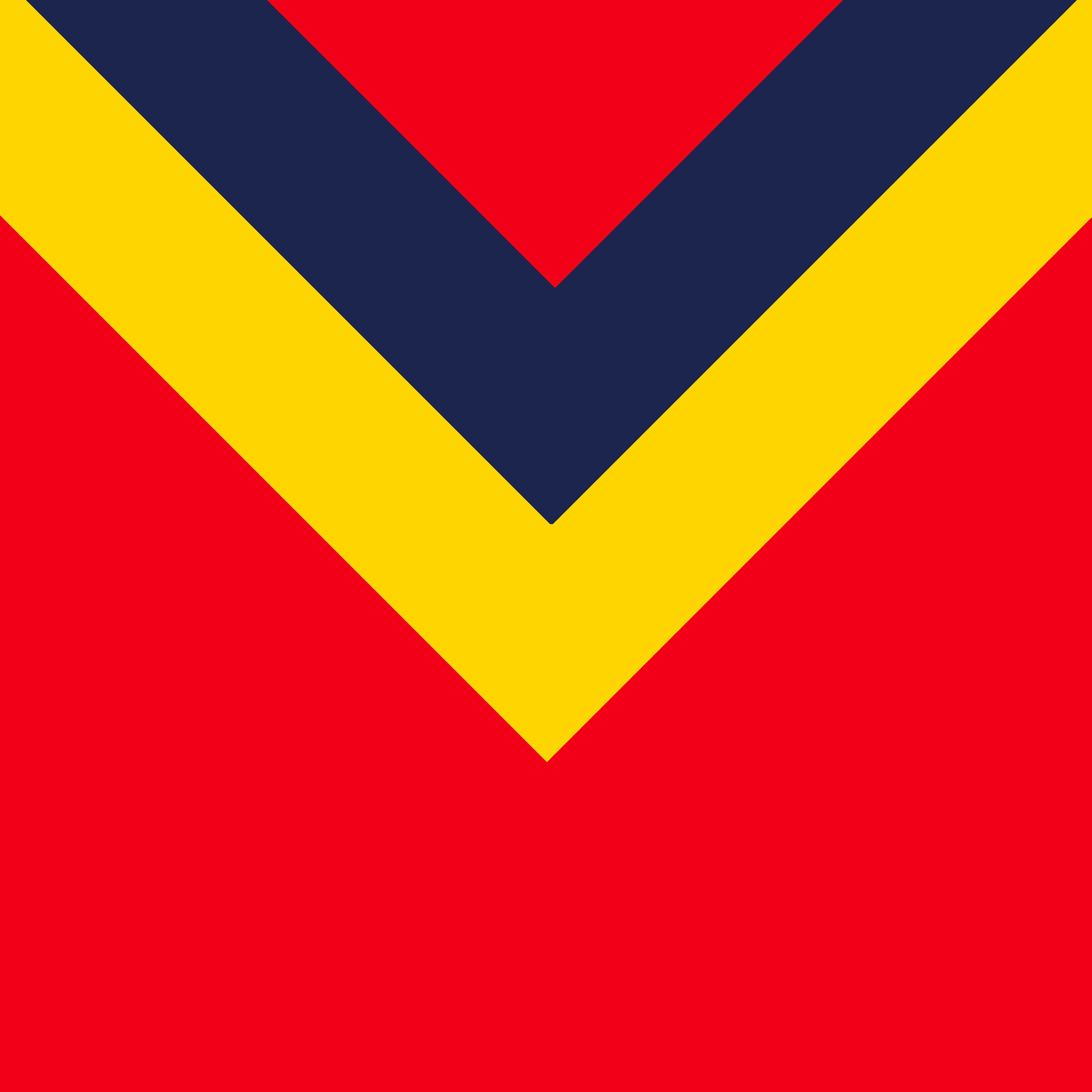
The SA's current jumper design debuted in 1986 State of Origin and revives the team's classic 1936 kit

The South Australian state football team wears a red guernsey with a Dark Blue and Gold chevron on the chest (this matches the South Australian Australian state and territory colours of Red, Dark Blue and Gold). The current kit dates to 1986 and was used primarily in the State of Origin era but has been used on and off in variations since 1936.

Between 1979–1985 the team wore vertical stripes with a white background, a kit design not popular with fans.

The Sporting Agreement in 1930 established the use of the state's current colour scheme. This was incorporated into the state team's jumper in 1936 and ratified in 1982.

Prior to 1936 the team used a number of designs based on "chocolate and turquoise" colours. In the 1908 Melbourne Carnival the turquoise was represented by a stripe across the midriff.

South Australia (1986-present)

=== Nickname ===
The team's nickname is The Croweaters. This term dates back to the Victorian Gold Rush when South Australians prospecting would travel great distances inland over infertile areas and run dangerously low on food, some would say they must have resorted to eating crows (Australian ravens), themselves scavengers. The term was synonymous with the team as early as its first match against Victoria in 1879.

== Honour of playing for South Australia ==
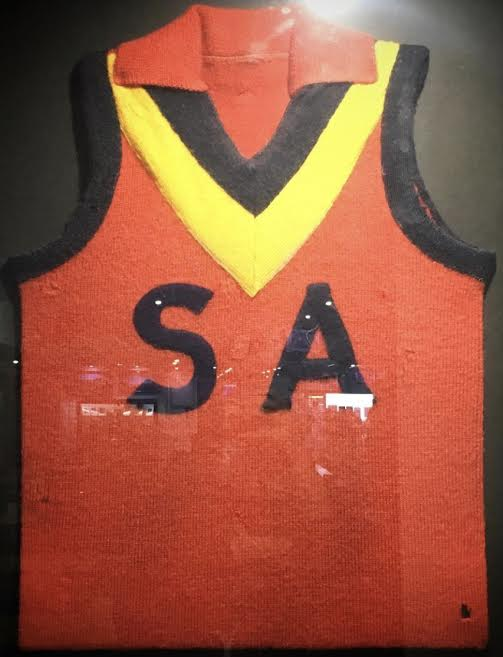
Bob Quinn's 1947 South Australian guernsey.

Many players have spoken of the honour of playing for South Australia. Graham Cornes has said when talking about being presented with the South Australian jumper "the pride of holding the jumper first—I can't describe that", and has also said that "pulling the South Australian jumper on is like a dream come true". Former South Australian and Carlton player Andrew McKay has stated, "I never dreamt of playing VFL/AFL as a child, but I always dreamt of playing for my state". Neil Kerley has stated about playing for South Australia that "it was another level". John Platten has been quoted as saying that "state jumpers have to be earned."

== Rivalries ==
=== Victoria ===
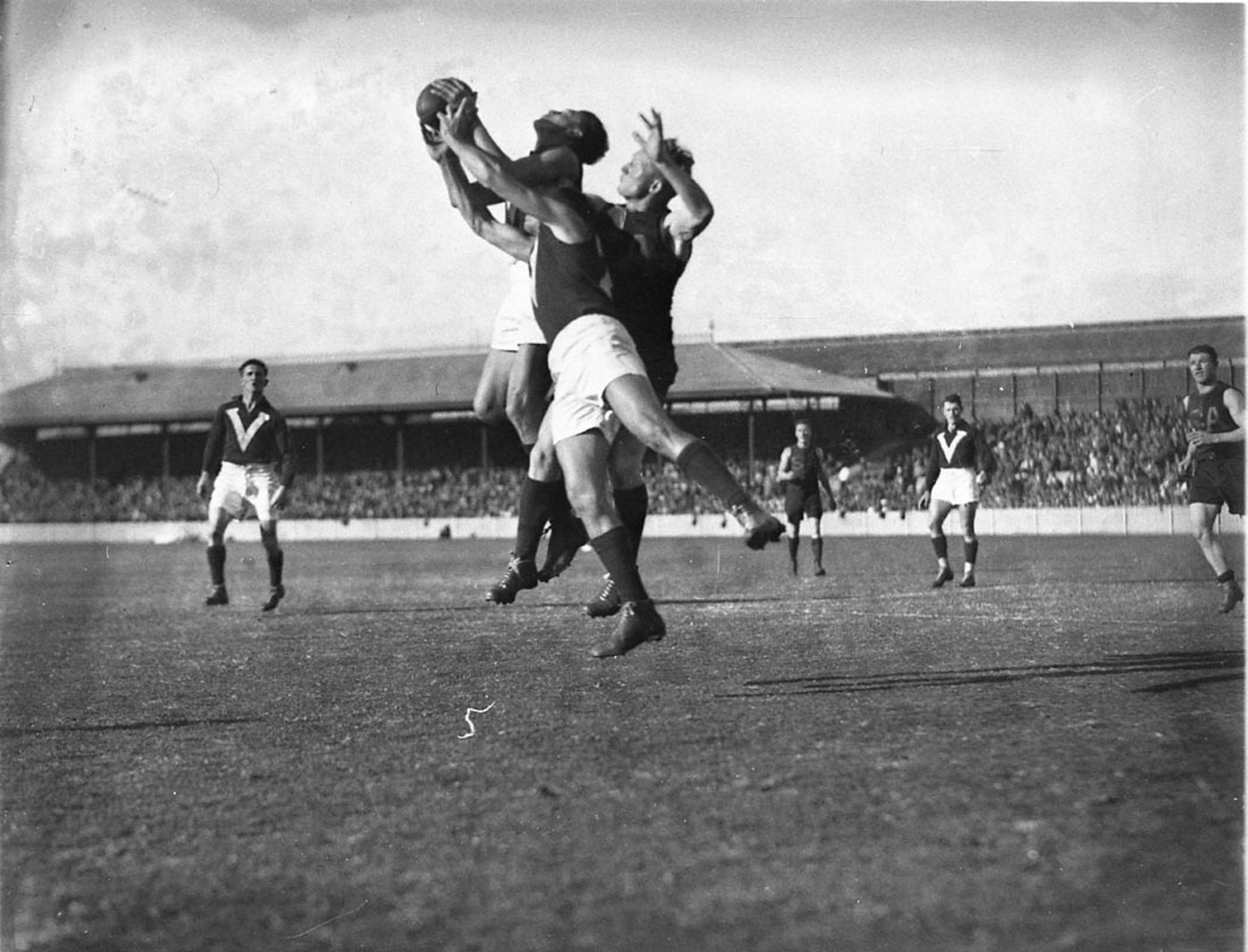
South Australian player contesting a mark against Victoria players during the Australian National Football Council Interstate Carnival at the Sydney Cricket Ground in 1933

Although the rivalry with Western Australia is very strong, the rivalry between South Australia and Victoria is the strongest.

Neil Kerley has stated that beating Victoria was the ultimate in football in South Australia. After stating that the interviewer said "you've got premierships as a player and coach", but Kerley followed up with "they were great" but continued to state it was the ultimate achievement. Neil Kerley has also stated before an Interstate Carnival grand final with Victoria, that "I don't like the Victorians and I think the South Australians are every bit as good".

Graham Cornes has stated about the rivalry with Victoria that "they don't rate anyone else, they don't regard, it's a lack of respect and appreciation". He then followed up saying "there've been some great footballers out of South Australia who are just unknown in Victoria". He's also commented on Victoria taking South Australia's best footballers away and making them play for Victoria, stating "you even claimed Malcolm Blight as a Victorian, we never quite forgave you for that". Cornes has also described the football culture in Victoria as insular, for their lack of regard for football outside their state.

Former Victorian captain Garry Lyon has commented on games in South Australia versus Victoria, that fans in Adelaide absolutely loved those games, the fans in attendance were "hostile and maniacal", and "by the time the games came around they were whipped into a frenzy".

Ben Hart has talked about South Australia playing Victoria by saying,"the games against Victoria have always been such huge occasions for South Australians".

Brett Chalmers was quoted saying before South Australia played Victoria in 1992, "I'd love to beat the Victorians, every South Australian doesn't like the Victorians, it'll be great to beat them".

Victorian Paul Roos has described the first state game he played in South Australia, saying: "when walking up the entrance and onto Football Park [it] was an experience in itself. I quickly realised how much hatred existed towards Victorians and their football". He has also stated about State of Origin games against South Australia, saying: "from an early age I was glued to the television hoping Victoria would destroy South Australia".

=== Western Australia ===
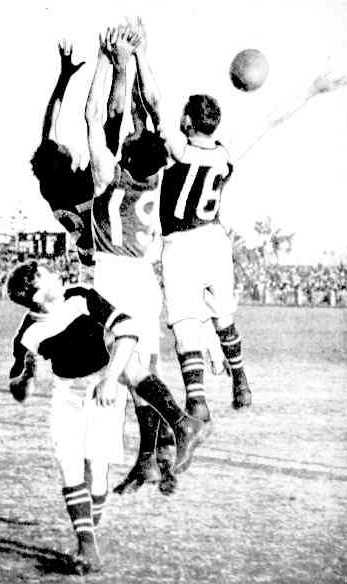
South Australia vs Western Australia in 1921

South Australia also has an intense rivalry with Western Australia. It has been described that South Australia likes to try and underline its authority over Western Australia and let it be known that it's the more powerful football state of the pair.

Fans at games between South Australia and Western Australia have been described as vociferous and parochial. A game between Western Australia and South Australia in Adelaide has been described as "parochialism raining".

== Notable State of Origin games ==
South Australia have been involved in some of the most notable games in the history of Australian football. Here are some of them.

1993 South Australia 16.13.109 d Victoria 14.13.97: A close game at the MCG saw South Australia just get home in a game where Darren Jarman kicks six goals and Gary Ablett kicks five.

1992 South Australia 19.19 133 d Victoria 18.12.120: A game that Wayne Carey has described the reason he believed he could succeed in the AFL. In a high scoring game, Stephen Kernahan kicks six goals, Paul Salmon kicks five, Paul Roos kicks three and Wayne Carey dominates at centre half forward, kicking two goals. A classic where South Australia get home in the dying moments.

1984 Victoria 16.12.108 d South Australia 16.8.104: A packed house at Football Park set the stage for a thriller, in a game where Stephen Kernahan kicks ten goals, Paul Salmon kicks five and Peter Daicos kicks three.

1984 Western Australia 14.14.98 d South Australia 14.13.97: One of the most controversial State of Origin games, Western Australia came from 14 points down at the last break to win by a point. Late in the last quarter Western Australia was awarded a controversial free kick close to goal for holding the ball, and took the lead. With scores tied and seconds to go, a Western Australia player kicked a point on the run from outside 50, kicking the ball just before the siren went, to give Western Australia the lead.

1994 South Australia 11.9.75 d Victoria 10.13.73: A game regarded as one of the greatest games in the history of Australian football. In a close game, Tony Modra kicks six goals and Gary Ablett kicks four.

1986 South Australia 18.17.125 d Victoria 17.13.115: A high-scoring game, where Stephen Kernahan, Grenville Dietrich, and Victoria Australian rules football team's Paul Salmon all kick 4 goals. The game also features John Platten, Tony McGuiness, Greg Williams, Dale Weightman, Chris McDermott and Dermott Brereton.

1989 (Game 2): Victoria 22.7 (149) d. South Australia 9.9 (63). Although Victoria had won Game 1 handily earlier that year by 54 points against Western Australia, South Australia were seen as a legitimate threat, as Victoria had not won a single game against South Australia since the 1984 Australian Football Championships, played five years prior, despite playing off each year (albeit one loss was a result of a technical forfeit). Despite this, various ins bolstered the Victorian line-up. Even without Ablett, Victoria's inclusion of Dermott Brereton and Tony Lockett to an already stacked line-up helped Victoria crush South Australia's chances. Nine of Victoria's 22 for this game (41%) would be future inductees into the Australian Football Hall of Fame. The game was played in front of a record-breaking game for a State of Origin (91,960), a record that stands to this day.

1987 South Australia 12.13.85 d Victoria 11.15.81: South Australia get home in a close finish, in a game that features John Platten, Chris McDermott, Gary Ablett, Dermott Brereton and Tony McGuiness.

1983 South Australia 26.16.172 d Victoria 17.14.117: In front of 42,521 parochial home fans at Football Park, the Croweaters earned their first win over Victoria at home since 1964 with a stirring 53-point win. Starring for South Australia were Fos Williams Medalist Michael Aish, Bruce Lindner, Peter Motley, John Platten and Mark Naley

== Croweaters in popular culture ==
There was a song by the Coodabeen Champions created about South Australia, a parody of "I've Been Everywhere" called "Came from Adelaide", which describes two people watching a game between South Australia and Victoria, when one person says "Those Croweaters just can't play", while the other person replies: "That just isn't true, South Australians are great, as I'm about to tell you."

== Carnival history ==
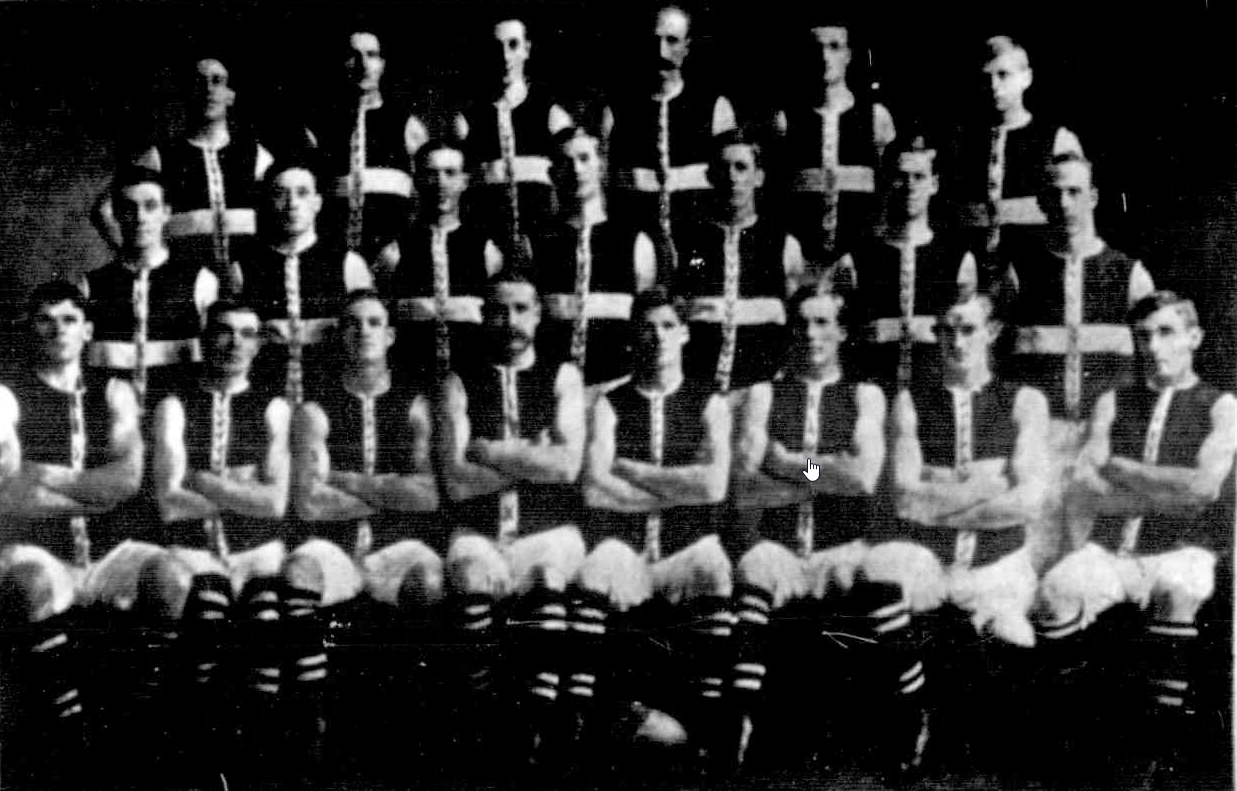
1908 squad

- 1908: 3rd
- 1911: 1st
- 1914: 2nd
- 1921: 3rd
- 1924: 3rd
- 1927: 3rd
- 1930: 2nd
- 1933: 2nd
- 1937: 3rd
- 1947: 3rd
- 1950: 2nd
- 1953: 2nd
- 1956: 4th
- 1958: 4th
- 1961: 3rd
- 1966: 3rd
- 1969: 2nd
- 1972: 3rd
- 1975: 2nd
- 1979: 3rd
- 1980: 2nd
- 1988: 1st, Division 1
- 1993: 1st, Division 1

=== National Under 18 Championships ===
- 7: 1978, 1979, 1980, 1991, 1995, 2013, 2014, 2018

== Fos Williams Medal ==
Mark Williams presents Tom Lewis with a Fos Williams Medal following the 2026 State Game between the SANFL and the VFL at Glenelg Oval

The Fos Williams Medal was awarded to the best player from a South Australian team. The medal was first awarded in 1981 and is named for the South Australian football legend Fos Williams.

== List of matches (incomplete) ==
=== SAFA Intercolonial results vs Victoria 1879 - 1906 (incomplete) ===
The South Australian Football Association (SAFA) formed on 30 April 1877 and the Victorian Football Association (VFA) on 17 May 1877 were the first senior associations to arrange regular intercolonial football matches. Prior to 1897 the team with the most goals scored were declared the winner.

Western Australia played its first interstate games in 1904, which included a win over South Australia in Adelaide after losing to Victoria in Melbourne. The Australasian Football Council was established 1906, and it assumed administration for interstate football.

Year	Game# / Date / Fixture			Opponent	Score and Result	Host City/Venue	Crowd
1879	1	1 July	Intercolonial	Victoria	SAFA: 0.3 (0) defeated by VFA: 7.14 (7)	East Melbourne Cricket Ground	10,000
1879	2	5 July	Intercolonial	Victoria	SAFA: 1.4 (4) defeated by VFA: 4.9 (4)	East Melbourne Cricket Ground	6,000
1880	3	14 August	Intercolonial	Victoria	SAFA: 2.7 (2) defeated by VFA: 5.13 (5)	Adelaide Oval	4,000
1880	4	18 August	State of Origin (SA team - 23 locally born)	Victoria	SAFA: 1.1 (1) defeated by VFA: 5.17 (5)	Adelaide Oval	1,500
1880	5	21 August	Intercolonial	Victoria	SAFA: 0.6 (0) defeated by VFA: 3.2 (3)	Adelaide Oval	2,500

=== South Australia v West Australia Interstate Matches ===
Western Australia played its first interstate games in 1904, which included a win over South Australia in Adelaide after losing to Victoria in Melbourne. Western Australia defeated South Australia 10.7 (67) to 8.10 (58) in their inaugural interstate Australian rules football match on Saturday, August 20, 1904. Played at Jubilee Oval in Adelaide, the nine-point victory kicked off one of Australian football's longest-running state rivalries. In 2025 the two states played their 100th encounter.

As at 2026 in 101 games - South Australia have had 51 wins and 50 losses against Western Australia. Source -

The Australasian Football Council was established 1906, and it assumed administration for interstate football.

=== SANFL results since 1991 ===
The original VFL formed in 1897 changed name to AFL in 1990. VFA formed in 1877 changed name to VFL in 1996.

Bold text indicates the home team.

Year	Result	Venue
1991	**WAFL**17.20 (122) def. SANFL 11.12 (78)	Subiaco Oval
1992	**SANFL** 9.18 (72) def. WAFL 9.12 (66)	Football Park
1993	**WAFL** 15.20 (110) def. SANFL 13.8 (86)	WACA Ground
1994	WAFL 10.14 (74) def. **SANFL** 7.18 (60)	Football Park
1995	**TFL** 14.15 (99) def. SANFL 12.12 (84)	North Hobart Oval
1996	SANFL 15.20 (110) def. **WAFL** 6.9 (45)	Subiaco Oval
1997	SANFL 13.17 (95) def. **ACTFL** 8.5 (53)	
1998	**SANFL** 17.13 (115) def. WAFL 10.10 (70)	Football Park
1999	SANFL 12.11 (83) def. **VFL** 8.11 (59)	MCG
2000	**SANFL** 15.17 (107) def. WAFL 8.17 (65)	Adelaide Oval
2001	**SANFL** 20.14 (134) def. VFL 14.12 (96)	Adelaide Oval
2002	VFL 18.17 (125) def. **SANFL** 10.9 (69)	Adelaide Oval
2003	SANFL 17.16 (118) def. **WAFL** 8.10 (58)	Fremantle Oval
2005	SANFL 20.8 (128) def. **VFL** 18.16 (124)	North Port Oval
2006	**SANFL** 14.14 (98) def. WAFL 12.9 (81)	Adelaide Oval
2008	**SANFL** 25.11 (161) def. VFL 14.12 (96)	Adelaide Oval
2009	**WAFL** 12.10 (82) def. SANFL 12.9 (81)	Leederville Oval
2012	**SANFL** 15.11 (101) def. WAFL 13.9 (87)	Glenelg Oval
2013	**SANFL** 21.14 (140) def. NEAFL North 9.4 (58)	Richmond Oval
2014	SANFL 18.10 (118) def. **VFL** 14.12 (96)	North Port Oval
2015	**WAFL** 18.13 (121) def. SANFL 11.10 (76)	Lathlain Park
2016	**SANFL** 16.10 (106) def. VFL 13.9 (87)	Adelaide Oval
2018	WAFL 15.12 (102) def. **SANFL** 11.10 (76)	Adelaide Oval
2019	SANFL 16.4 (100) def. **WAFL** 13.15 (93)	Perth Stadium
2021	**SANFL** 20.10 (130) def. WAFL 11.11 (77)	Adelaide Oval
2022	SANFL 10.10 (70) def. **WAFL** 9.12 (66)	Perth Stadium
2023	**SANFL** 8.16 (64) def. WAFL 7.9 (51)	Adelaide Oval
2024	**SANFL** 10.5 (65) def. VFL 7.9 (51)	Glenelg Oval
2024	SANFL 16.13 (109) def. **WAFL** 5.16 (46)	Perth Stadium
2025	**SANFL** 15.13 (103) def. by VFL 18.6 (114)	Tanunda Recreation Park
2025	WAFL 13.8 (86) def. **SANFL** 8.8 (56)	Adelaide Oval
2026	VFL 15.13 (103) def. **SANFL** 14.14 (98)	Glenelg Oval
2026	**WAFL 14.14 (98)** def. SANFL 9.8 (62)	Leederville Oval

== Other state teams ==
The South Australian National Football League has a representative state team that plays annually against other state league teams. The South Australian Amateur Football League has a state team that plays annually against other state amateur league teams. There was a women's Victorian representative team that played annually in the defunct AFL Women's National Championships. There are also Under-18 South Australian teams that competes annually in the AFL and AFL Women's Under-18 Championships.

South Australia is also represented in the annual veterans' game, the E. J. Whitten Legends Game, by the All-Stars team representing all states apart from Victoria.
