= Samuel J. Brown =

World War II American fighter pilot

Samuel Jesse Brown
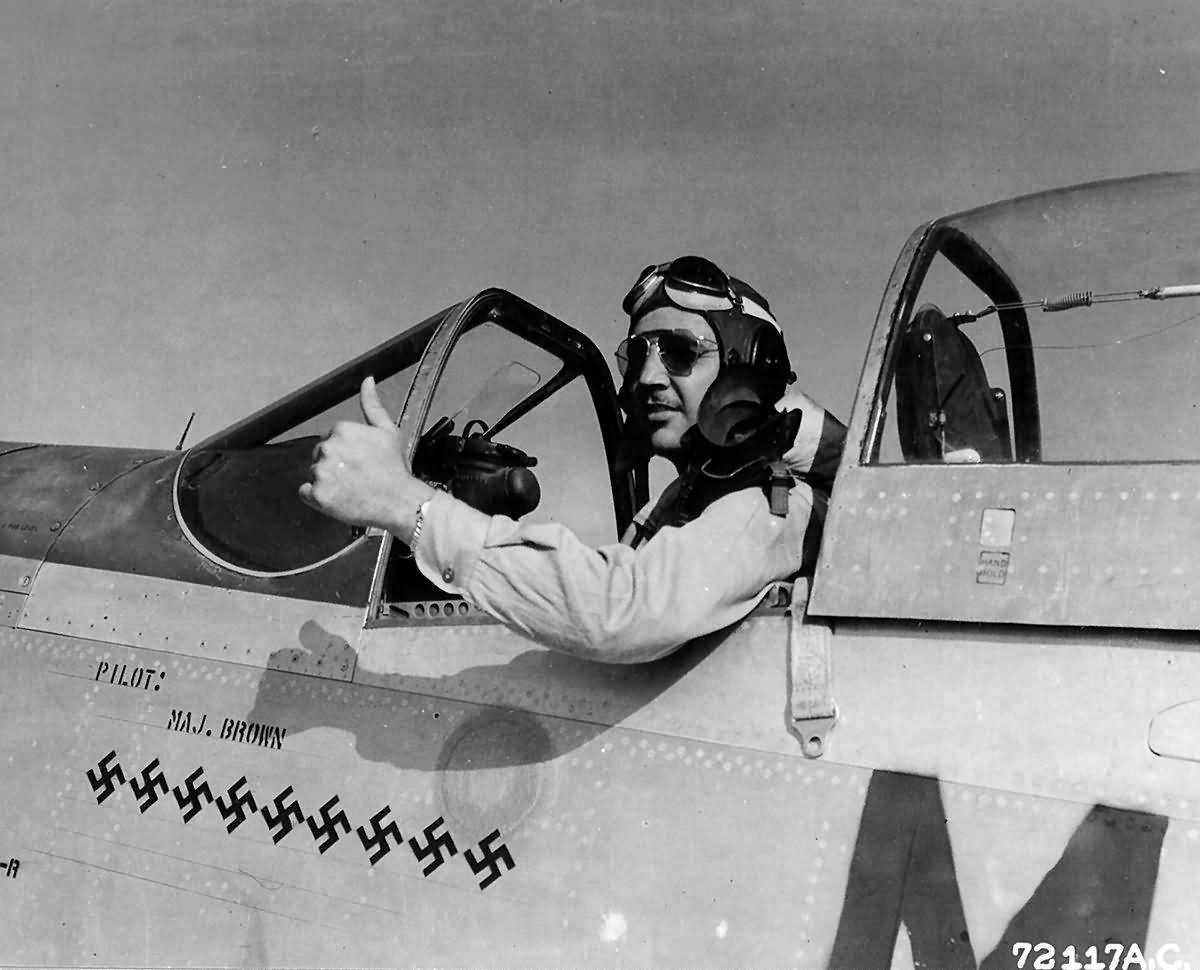
- Major Samuel Jesse Brown of the 309th Fighter Squadron
- Born: October 3, 1917; Bartlesville, Oklahoma
- Died: August 23, 1990 (aged 72)
- Burial place: Fort Sam Houston National Cemetery
- Military career
- Allegiance: United States
- Branch: United States Army Air Forces
- Rank: Major
- Service number: 0-431846
- Unit: 31st Fighter Group
- Commands: 307th Fighter Squadron
- Conflicts: World War II
- Awards: Distinguished Service Cross; Silver Star

Samuel Jesse Brown (October 3, 1917 – August 23, 1990) was a fighter pilot and a major in the United States Air Forces during World War II.

== 307th Fighter Squadron ==
Brown commanded the 307th Fighter Squadron of the 31st Fighter Group between May and September 1944.

He shot down 15.5 aircraft between April 17 and July 26, 1944.

He received the Distinguished Service for attacking a formation of 50 German fighters near Vienna, Austria that were preparing to attack a formation of 15th Air Force bombers near Vienna. During the subsequent aerial combat that followed, Brown shot down four of the planes and damaged two others.

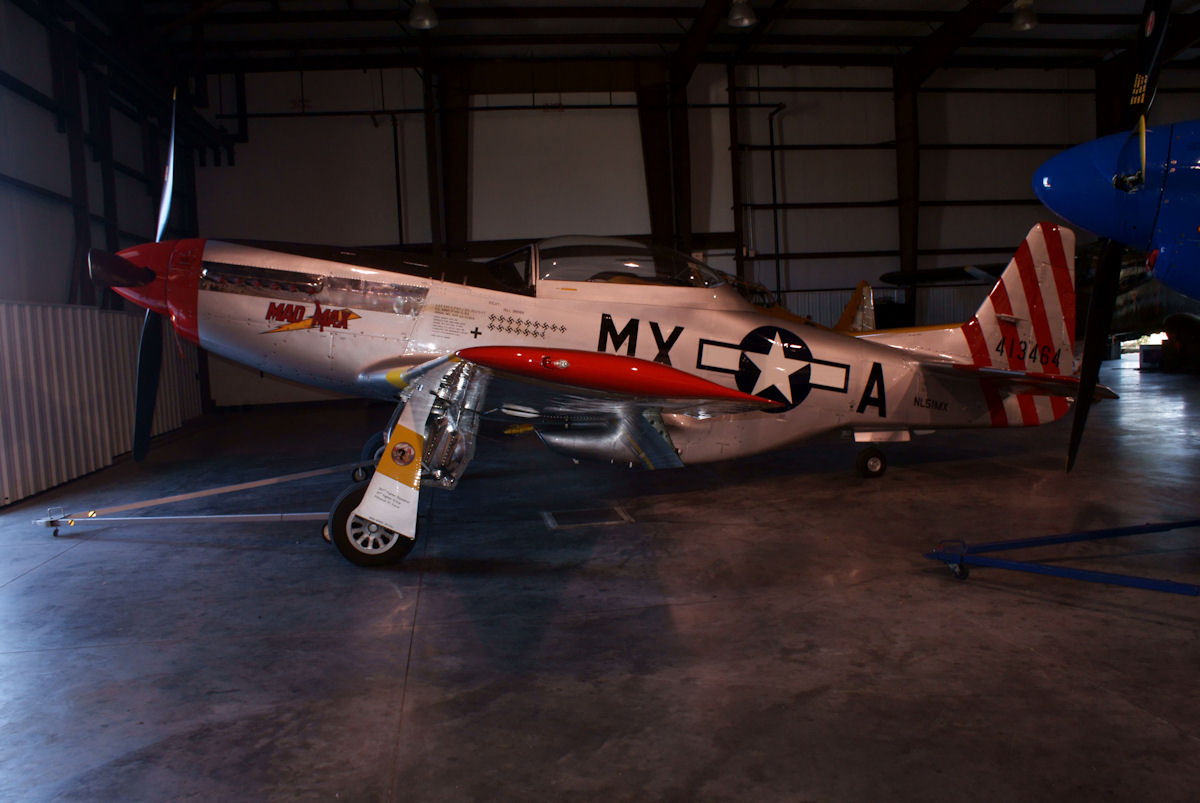
Brown's P-51D Mustang restored

== See also ==
- Harrison Thyng
