= George Stavrinos =

Green-American illustrator

George Stavrinos (1948 – August 3, 1990) was a Greek American illustrator. Born in Somerville, Massachusetts, he graduated from the Rhode Island School of Design in 1969. After a year of study abroad he moved to Philadelphia and worked as a mural artist for local businesses. Stavrinos eventually moved to New York and began working for Push Pin Studios and The New York Times in the mid-1970s before he began his run of influential department store campaigns began in 1977.

He was a 2007 inductee into the Society of Illustrators' Hall of Fame.

His client list included Bergdorf Goodman, Barneys New York, Blueboy, Gentleman's Quarterly, The New York Times, and the Metropolitan Opera. His work for Bergdorf Goodman was hailed as significantly influential and expanded the notions of what fashion illustration could be, incorporating highly elaborate scenery with narrative qualities and cinematic reference.

Stavrinos's works for gay publications and companies were equally revered with commissions for Fire Island Pines Society, Colt Studios, Christopher Street, Gay Source, Lighthouse Court Key West and After Dark. His social circle involved influential gay figures of the 1970s and 1980s such as Paul Popham, Robert Nathan Fain, Stephen Sondheim, Edmund White and Felice Picano.

Posthumous exhibitions include:

- Stroke: From Under The Mattress to Out in the Open. Leslie Lohman Museum, New York, 2014.
- Fashion Illustration: The Visionaries. Society of Illustrators, New York, 2020.
- The Vision of George Stavrinos, Society of Illustrators, New York, 2013.

Various works are in the permanent collections of galleries including New Hampshire Institute of Art; Leslie-Lohman Museum of Art, New York; ClampArt NYC, New York; and Francis Neady Collection at Fashion Institute of Technology, New York.
