= Les Harvey (footballer) =

Australian rules footballer, born 1909

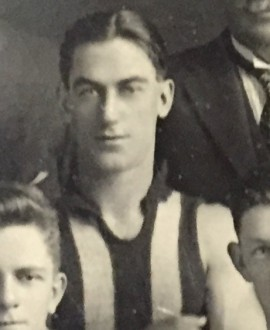
- Harvey in 1932

Personal information
- Full name: Leslie Richard Harvey
- Born: 10 November 1909; Carlton, Victoria
- Died: 12 August 1990 (aged 80)
- Original team: Camberwell
- Height: 173 cm (5 ft 8 in)
- Weight: 71 kg (157 lb)

Playing career^{1}
Years	Club	Games (Goals)
1932	Collingwood	4 (0)
- ^{1} Playing statistics correct to the end of 1932.

Leslie Richard Harvey (10 November 1909 – 12 August 1990) was an Australian rules footballer who played with Collingwood in the Victorian Football League (VFL).
