= Stuart Hamilton (footballer) =

Australian rules footballer

Personal information
- Full name: Joseph Stuart Patrick Hamilton
- Born: 13 September 1918; Carrickfergus, Northern Ireland
- Died: 26 August 1990 (aged 71); Chelsea, Victoria
- Original team: Bentleigh
- Height: 183 cm (6 ft 0 in)
- Weight: 81 kg (179 lb)

Playing career^{1}
| Years | Club | Games (Goals) |
| 1943–47 | Hawthorn | 58 (12) |
- ^{1} Playing statistics correct to the end of 1947.

Joseph Stuart Patrick Hamilton (13 September 1918 – 26 August 1990) was an Australian rules footballer who played with Hawthorn in the Victorian Football League (VFL).

== Family ==
The son of Alexander Hamilton (1886–1922) and Jane Elizabeth Hamilton, née McGiffin (1893–1981), Joseph Stuart Patrick Hamilton was born at Carrickfergus near Belfast in Northern Ireland on 13 September 1918. His father died when he was three and his mother subsequently remarried to Charles Crandles, and the entire family immigrated to Victoria, Australia in May 1931.

Stuart Hamilton married Margaret Mary Doran (1921–2004) in 1942.

== War service ==
During World War II, Hamilton initially served in the Volunteer Defence Corps of the Australian Army before serving in the Royal Australian Air Force for the final years of the war.

== Football career ==
Recruited from Bentleigh, Hamilton played 58 games for Hawthorn over five seasons. He subsequently coached Nathalia in the Goulburn Valley League.

== Honours and achievements ==
Individual

- Hawthorn life member
