= Jacob J. Hecht =

Chabad rabbi

Rabbi Jacob J. Hecht
- Born: 1924; Brownsville, Brooklyn
- Died: August 5, 1990 (aged 65–66); New York City
- Occupation: Director of National Committee for the Furtherance of Jewish Education

Jacob J. Hecht (1924 – August 5, 1990), known occasionally as Rabbi JJ, was the assistant and translator of Rabbi Menachem Mendel Shneerson (the Lubavitcher Rebbe), and a leading Chabad rabbi, educator, writer and radio commentator.

== Early life ==
Hecht was born in 1924 in Brownsville, Brooklyn. He was one of six brothers, all of whom became prominent Lubavitcher Chassidim. Hecht received rabbinical ordination from the Lubavitcher Yeshiva and, in 1947, was appointed head of Congregation Rabbi Meyer Simcha HaCohen in East Flatbush, a role he held for over four decades.

== Leadership and Community Involvement ==
Hecht served as the spiritual leader of Congregation Meir Simcha Hakohen in East Flatbush and held the position of executive vice president of the National Committee for the Furtherance of Jewish Education for 44 years. Hecht co-founded the Hadar Hatorah Rabbinical College for Men with Rabbi Yisroel Jacobson and served as its dean. The yeshiva was later renamed in his memory. Additionally, Hecht served as vice president of the Iranian Jewish Children's Fund and founded the Ivy League Torah Study Program.

Hecht was also the official translator for Rabbi Menachem Mendel Schneerson, providing live English translations of the Rebbe's Yiddish radio discourses. He worked as a commentator on WEVD-AM radio.

== Camp Emunah ==
In 1953, Rabbi Menachem Mendel Schneerson encouraged Hecht to purchase a facility and establish Camp Emunah, the first overnight Lubavitch children's camp. Since its founding, the camp has expanded significantly, now offering more than half a dozen summer programs and hosting over 600 girls annually. Over the past 65 years, it has served more than 100,000 participants.

== Author ==
He wrote two books: Brimstone and Fire and Essays on Judaism.

== Personal life ==
Hecht was married to Chava Hecht (née Lasker) who was the longtime director of Camp Emunah in the Catskills. She died in February 2022 at the age of 95.

They had twelve children and over one hundred grandchildren. Notable descendants include Shea Hecht, chairman of the National Committee for the Furtherance of Jewish Education, and Aaron Raskin, founder of Congregation B’nai Avraham in Brooklyn Heights.
