= Rhett Baynes =

Australian rules footballer

Personal information
- Full name: Rhett Clarke Baynes
- Born: 16 May 1964
- Died: 30 August 1990 (aged 26)
- Original team: East Victoria Park JFC
- Height: 195 cm (6 ft 5 in)
- Weight: 95 kg (209 lb)

Playing career^{1}
Years	Club	Games (Goals)
1980–84	Perth (WAFL)	78 (40)
1985–86	Carlton	13 (6)
Total		91 (46)
- ^{1} Playing statistics correct to the end of 1986.

Career highlights
- Carlton reserves best and fairest 1986

Rhett Clarke Baynes (16 May 1964 – 30 August 1990) was an Australian rules footballer who played with the Perth Football Club in the West Australian Football League (WAFL) and the Carlton in the Victorian Football League (VFL) during the 1980s.

Baynes had started playing senior WAFL football for Perth at the age of just 16. A ruckman and key forward, Baynes represented Western Australia in interstate football before being recruited by Carlton for the 1985 VFL season.

Bayes appeared in the first 11 rounds of the 1985 season, performing well in a win over Sydney at the Sydney Cricket Ground (SCG) with 16 disposals. The following year he won Carlton's reserves 'Best and Fairest' award and twice turned out for the seniors late in the season.

After two seasons at Carlton, Baynes returned to Perth. He died by suicide in August 1990.
