= Jack Sanders (Australian footballer) =

Australian rules footballer, born 1904

Personal information
- Full name: William James Sanders
- Born: 8 August 1904; Warrenheip, Victoria
- Died: 24 August 1990 (aged 86); Ferntree Gully, Victoria
- Position: Half-back flank

Playing career^{1}
| Years | Club | Games (Goals) |
| 1926 | North Melbourne | 1 (0) |
- ^{1} Playing statistics correct to the end of 1926.

Jack Sanders (8 August 1904 – 24 August 1990) was an Australian rules footballer who played with North Melbourne in the Victorian Football League (VFL).

== Family ==
The youngest child born to Michael Patrick Sanders (1872–1921) and Margaret Sanders, nee Walsh (1869–1929), William James Sanders was born at Warrenheip on 8 August 1904. He was known as Jack Sanders during his football career.

== Football ==
Sanders joined North Melbourne from the local C.Y.M.S. team for the 1926 season and played a single senior game against South Melbourne in Round 16 of that season.

== Death ==
Sanders died at Ferntree Gully on 24 August 1990 and was cremated at Springvale Botanical Cemetery.
