= 1996 SANFL season =

117th season of top-level Australian rules football in South Australia

- Teams: 9
- Premiers: Port Adelaide; 34th premiership
- Minor premiers: Central District; 3rd minor premiership
- Magarey Medallist: Josh Francou; North Adelaide (26 votes)
- Ken Farmer Medallist: Scott Hodges; Port Adelaide (102 Goals)
- Matches played: 96
- Highest: 46,210 (Grand Final, Port Adelaide vs. Central District)

The 1996 South Australian National Football League season was the 117th season of the top-level Australian rules football competition in South Australia.

The season opened on 30 March and concluded on 6 October with the Grand Final, in which Port Adelaide went on to record its 34th premiership, defeating Central District by 36 points.

Norwood, Woodville-West Torrens, West Adelaide also made the top (final) five teams and participated in the finals series. North Adelaide, Glenelg, South Adelaide, Sturt all missed the top five, with the last of those finishing last to record its 18th wooden spoon.

The 1996 SANFL season marked the end of an era for Port Adelaide being their last year in the SANFL, as the Port Adelaide Football Club joined the AFL in 1997.

== Premiership season ==
=== Round 1 ===
| | Round 1 |
| Saturday, 30 March (2:10 pm) | Central District 13.9 (87) | def. by | Norwood 14.12 (96) | Football Park | [Report] |
| Saturday, 30 March (2:10 pm) | South Adelaide 16.9 (105) | def. | Sturt 8.4 (52) | Hickinbotham Oval | [Report] |
| Saturday, 30 March (2:10 pm) | West Adelaide 7.9 (51) | def. by | Woodville-West Torrens 10.10 (70) | Richmond Oval | [Report] |
BYE - Port Adelaide, North Adelaide, Glenelg

=== Round 2 ===
| | Round 2 |
| Saturday, 6 April (2:10 pm) | Port Adelaide 4.6 (30) | def. by | Central District 8.9 (57) | Football Park (crowd: 7527) | [Report] |
| Saturday, 6 April (2:10 pm) | Glenelg 12.13 (85) | def. | Sturt 7.8 (50) | Glenelg Oval | [Report] |
| Saturday, 6 April (2:10 pm) | Norwood 11.13 (79) | def. | South Adelaide 7.14 (56) | Norwood Oval | [Report] |
| Saturday, 6 April (2:10 pm) | North Adelaide 9.9 (63) | def. | West Adelaide 9.7 (61) | Prospect Oval | [Report] |
BYE - Woodville-West Torrens

== Ladder ==
1996 SANFL Ladder
| Pos | Team | Pld | W | L | D | PF | PA | PP | Pts |
|---|---|---|---|---|---|---|---|---|---|
| 1 | Central District | 20 | 15 | 5 | 0 | 1970 | 1315 | 59.97 | 30 |
| 2 | Norwood | 20 | 15 | 5 | 0 | 1773 | 1381 | 56.21 | 30 |
| 3 | Port Adelaide (P) | 20 | 13 | 7 | 0 | 1928 | 1491 | 56.39 | 26 |
| 4 | Woodville-West Torrens | 20 | 12 | 8 | 0 | 1627 | 1504 | 51.96 | 24 |
| 5 | West Adelaide | 20 | 10 | 10 | 0 | 1632 | 1472 | 52.58 | 20 |
| 6 | North Adelaide | 20 | 8 | 12 | 0 | 1521 | 1734 | 46.73 | 16 |
| 7 | Glenelg | 20 | 7 | 13 | 0 | 1487 | 1812 | 45.07 | 14 |
| 8 | South Adelaide | 20 | 6 | 14 | 0 | 1449 | 1891 | 43.38 | 12 |
| 9 | Sturt | 20 | 4 | 16 | 0 | 1360 | 2147 | 38.78 | 8 |

Rules for classification: 1) points; 2) percentage; 3) number of points for.
(P) Premiers

== Finals series ==
=== Elimination and qualifying Finals ===
| Elimination and qualifying Finals |
| Woodville-West Torrens 20.7 (127) | def. | West Adelaide 9.8 (62) | Football Park | [Report] |
| Port Adelaide 10.18 (78) | def. | Norwood 9.11 (65) | Football Park (crowd: 31,245) | [Report] |

=== Semi-finals ===
| | Semi-finals |
| Saturday, 22 September (2:10 pm) | Norwood 12.8 (80) | def. | Woodville-West Torrens 5.6 (36) | Football Park |
| Saturday, 22 September (6:10 pm) | Central District 12.15 (87) | def. | Port Adelaide 7.21 (63) | Football Park (crowd: 31604) |

=== Preliminary final ===
| | Preliminary Final |
| Sunday, 29 September (2:10 pm) | Port Adelaide 9.12 (66) | def. | Norwood 9.8 (62) | Football Park (crowd: 18,338) |
At the 29-minute mark of the 4th quarter Scott Hodges had a set shot from the boundary line 40m out to win the game.

=== Grand Final ===
1996 SANFL Grand Final
Sunday 6 October (2:10 pm) | Central District | def. by | Port Adelaide | Football Park (crowd: 46,120)
2.1 (13); 3.4 (22); 5.6 (36); 6.8 (44) | Q1; Q2; Q3; Final | 1.4 (10); 4.6 (30); 7.10 (52); 11.14 (80) | Umpires: Richard Williams, Michael Avon, Troy Burton; Jack Oatey Medallist: David Brown; Television broadcast: ABC
P. Vardy 2 T. Cook, A, Balkwill, J. Cotton, R. Girdham 1 | Goals | 7 S. Hodges; 2 W. Tredrea; 1 D. Smith, R. Smith
S. Schwerdt, S. Lee, R. Girdham | Best | D. Brown, F. Francis, S. Hodges
1996 marked the end of an era for Port Adelaide being their last year their first team played in the SANFL, as the club entered the AFL in 1997.; This is the highest attendance for an SANFL Grand Final since the first year of the Adelaide Crows in the AFL (1991).

== Attendances ==
=== By Club ===
1996 SANFL Attendances
| Club | Total | Games | Avg. Per Game |
|---|---|---|---|
| Port Adelaide | 264,410 | 24 | 11,017 |
