= 1999 SANFL Grand Final =

Port Adelaide	Norwood
14.17 (101)	14.9 (93)
	1	2	3	4
PA	2.1 (13)	8.5 (53)	12.11 (83)	14.17 (101)
NOR	4.2 (26)	9.6 (60)	10.8 (68)	14.9 (93)
- Date: Sunday, 3 October
- Stadium: Football Park
- Attendance: 39,135
- Umpires: Chambers, Woodcock, Rowston

The 1999 South Australian National Football League (SANFL) Grand Final saw the Port Adelaide Magpies defeat the Norwood Redlegs by 8 points. The match was played on Sunday 3 October 1999 at Football Park in front of a crowd of 39,135. .

Doug Robertson in The Advertiser described the game as "the most entertaining and skilful SANFL grand final in decades" and "one of its (Port's) most satisfying and remarkable comeback wins".

This was Port Adelaide's 36th premiership, and ninth in twelve years.

== Quarter by Quarter Scores ==
Team	Q1	Q2	Q3	Q4	Pts
Port Adelaide Magpies	2.1	8.5	12.11	14.17	101
Norwood Redlegs	4.2	9.6	10.8	14.9	93

== Teams and statistics ==
Port Adelaide:

F:	P. McGuinness	P. Evans	B. Beinke
HF:	R. O'Loughlin	D. Poole	David Brown
C:	J. Wait	A. Obst	S. Tregenza
HB:	S. Carter	B. Leys	T. Carr
B:	J. Poulton	N. Fiegert	P. Northeast
R:	B. Chalmers	D. Fraser	A. Bamford
Int:	Damien Brown	M. Clayton	D. Morgan

Norwood:

F:	B. Kemp	A. Pascoe	E. Warrior
HF:	S. Bassett	L. Bowman	J. Cotton
C:	J. Thiessen	A. Harvey	D. Obst
HB:	T. Clements	S. Pitt	P. McCormack
B:	T. Davey	D. Fleming	R. Neill
R:	J. Yerbury	R. James	J. Cunningham
Int:	I. Downsborough	A. Crouch	S. Direen

For Port Adelaide, Anthony (Tony) Bamford had 31 disposals (21 kicks, 10 handballs), followed by Darryl Poole with 30 (6 kicks, 24 handballs), and David Brown with 25 (13 kicks, 12 handballs). Brett Chalmers took 7 marks.

For Norwood, Ben Kemp had 32 disposals (24 kicks, 8 handballs), and Roger James had 29 (19 kick, 10 handballs). Paul McCormack took 5 marks.

== Goal Kickers ==
Port Adelaide: Brett Chalmers 3.0, M. Clayton 2.2, David Brown, P. McGuinness 2.1, S. Tregenza 2.0, A. Bamford 1.2, R. O'Loughlin 1.1, D. Poole 1.0, P. Evans, J. Waite 0.3, Damien Brown, D. Fraser, A. Obst 0.1, (Rushed 0.1). Norwood: E. Warrior 4.2, R. James 2.2, S. Bassett, A. Pascoe 2.1, D. Obst 1.1, S. Direen, A. Harvery, B. Kemp 1.0, (Rushed 0.2).

== Captains, Coaches, and Umpires ==
Port Adelaide was captained by David Brown and coached by Stephen Williams. Norwood was captained by Anthony Harvey and coached by Peter Rohde.

The game was umpired by Kevin Chambers, Derek Woodcock, and Colin Rowston.

== Jack Oatey Medal ==
The Jack Oatey Medal for best player in the Grand Final was awarded to Darryl Poole of Port Adelaide. Poole had previously missed two grand finals through suspension.

== Era of Success 1988–1999 ==
Port Adelaide experienced great success during the years 1988–1999, winning nine SANFL premierships in twelve years. This was a period of much upheaval for the SANFL and Port Adelaide, as the Adelaide Crows were formed and joined the Australian Football League (AFL) in 1991 and the Port Adelaide Football Club moved from the SANFL and joined the AFL in 1997.

In the 3 years during this period where Port did not win the premiership, they finished 5th (1991), 3rd (1993), and 2nd (1997).

During this period, the Port Adelaide Magpies lost several of its best players each year to the AFL and retirement yet still managed to dominate the SANFL. Players who joined the AFL from the Port Adelaide Magpies during this period include Nathan Buckley, Andrew McLeod, Gavin Wanganeen, Martin Leslie, Shane Bond, David Brown, Peter Burgoyne, Brett Chalmers, Che Cockatoo-Collins, Roger Delaney, Fabian Francis, Scott Hodges, David Hynes, Brayden Lyle, Darren Mead, Byron Pickett, Darryl Poole, Darren Smith, Warren Tredrea, Simon Tregenza, Darryl Wakelin, Shane Wakelin, Clive Waterhouse, and Michael Wilson.
