= 1996 SANFL Grand Final =

Central District	Port Adelaide
6.8 (44)	11.14 (80)
	1	2	3	4
CD	2.1 (13)	3.4 (22)	5.6 (36)	6.8 (44)
PA	1.4 (10)	4.6 (30)	7.10 (52)	11.14 (80)
- Date: Sunday 6 October 1996
- Stadium: Football Park
- Attendance: 46,120
- Umpires: Richard Williams, Michael Avon, and Troy Burton
- Coin toss won by: Central District
- Kicked toward: North End

Accolades
- Best on Ground: David Brown

Broadcast in Australia
- Network: ABC

The 1996 South Australian National Football League (SANFL) Grand Final saw the Port Adelaide Magpies defeat the Central District Bulldogs by 36 points. The match was played on Sunday 6 October 1996 at Football Park in front of a crowd of 46,120. As of the 2020 SANFL Grand Final, this is the highest attendance for an SANFL Grand Final since the first year of the Adelaide Crows in the AFL (1991).

This was Port Adelaide's 34th premiership, third premiership in a row, and seventh in nine years. Port would also go on to win in 1998 and 1999.

Port had also beaten Central District in the 1995 Grand Final. Thirteen Port players from the 1995 grand final also played in the 1996 grand final. For Central District, 12 players played in both.

Central District entered the Grand Final as favourite to win as they were minor premiers (first on the ladder prior to the finals) and had beaten Port on all four occasions that the teams had met in 1996 prior to the grand final.

== Match Summary ==
=== Jack Oatey Medal ===
The Jack Oatey Medal for best player in the Grand Final was awarded to David Brown of Port Adelaide. However, The Advertiser (Adelaide) newspaper judged Fabian Francis as the best player on the ground.

== Teams ==
Port Adelaide was captained by Tim Ginever and coached by Stephen Williams. Williams assumed the role mid-season following John Cahill's departure, who left to prepare for the Port Adelaide AFL team's entry. Central District was captained by Roger Girdham and coached by Steve Wright.

Port Adelaide
B:	4 George Fiacchi	7 Roger Delaney	24 Bryan Beinke
HB:	32 Paul Northeast	5 Brian Leys	36 Stephen Carter
C:	26 Greg Anderson	15 Michael Wilson	23 Phil McGuinness
HF:	16 Darryl Borlase (dvc)	28 Darren Smith	13 Rohan Smith
F:	56 Warren Tredrea	11 Scott Hodges	3 Fabian Francis
Foll:	33 Darren Mead	1 Tim Ginever (c)	21 David Brown
Int:	50 Tony Bamford	38 Shane Crothers	17 Nigel Fiegert
Coach:	Stephen Williams		

Central District
B:	12 Scott Lee	14 Damian Hicks	9 Michael Wakelin
HB:	40 Stephen Schwerdt	19 Brian Haraida	18 David Green
C:	29 James Saywell	23 Rick Macgowan	15 Scott Stevens
HF:	44 Jarrod Cotton	11 Andrew Balkwill	28 Craig Potter
F:	8 Jim Wynd	33 Mark Conway	30 Peter Vardy
Foll:	2 Robert Schaefer	10 Roger Girdham (c)	6 Tim Cook
Int:	55 Brenton Daniel	24 Peter Green	25 Simon Luhrs
Coach:	Stephen Wright		

== Umpires ==
The game was umpired by Richard Williams, Michael Avon, and Troy Burton.

== Scorecard ==
1996 SANFL Grand Final
Sunday 6 October (2:10 pm)	Central District	def. by	Port Adelaide	Football Park (crowd: 46,120)
2.1 (13); 3.4 (22); 5.6 (36); 6.8 (44)	Q1; Q2; Q3; Final	1.4 (10); 4.6 (30); 7.10 (52); 11.14 (80)	Umpires: Richard Williams, Michael Avon, Troy Burton; Jack Oatey Medallist: David Brown; Television broadcast: ABC
P. Vardy 2 T. Cook, A, Balkwill, J. Cotton, R. Girdham 1	Goals	7 Hodges; 2 Tredrea; 1 D. Smith, R. Smith
S. Schwerdt, S. Lee, R. Girdham	Best	Brown, Francis, Hodges
1996 marked the end of an era for Port Adelaide being their last year in the SANFL, as the Port Adelaide Football Club joined the AFL in 1997.; This is the highest attendance for an SANFL Grand Final since the first year of the Adelaide Crows in the AFL (1991).

== Port Adelaide entrance into the AFL ==
1996 Port Adelaide guernsey on display in the State Library of South Australia featuring signatures from Tim Ginever, John Cahill and Stephen Carter.

1996 marked the end of an era for Port Adelaide being their last year their senior most team played in the SANFL, as the Port Adelaide Football Club started fielding a side the AFL from 1997 onwards.

The Power's inaugural squad included eight players from the 1996 Port Adelaide SANFL premiership team, including Warren Tredrea, Scott Hodges, Michael Wilson, Fabian Francis, Stephen Carter, Darren Mead, David Brown and Nigel Fiegert.

Fellow Magpies Darryl Poole (who missed the Grand Final via suspension), Peter Burgoyne, Tom Carr, Paul Evans and Jason Dylan (rookie list) would round out the homegrown picks. They would be joined by former Magpies returning from other AFL clubs including inaugural captain Gavin Wanganeen, Brayden Lyle and Shane Bond.

Central District would supply the Power with two players from their defeated Grand Final team, Jarrod Cotton and Mark Conway, and juniors Stuart Dew and Nathan Steinberner.
