= Australian rules football culture =

Cultural influences in the sport of Australian rules football

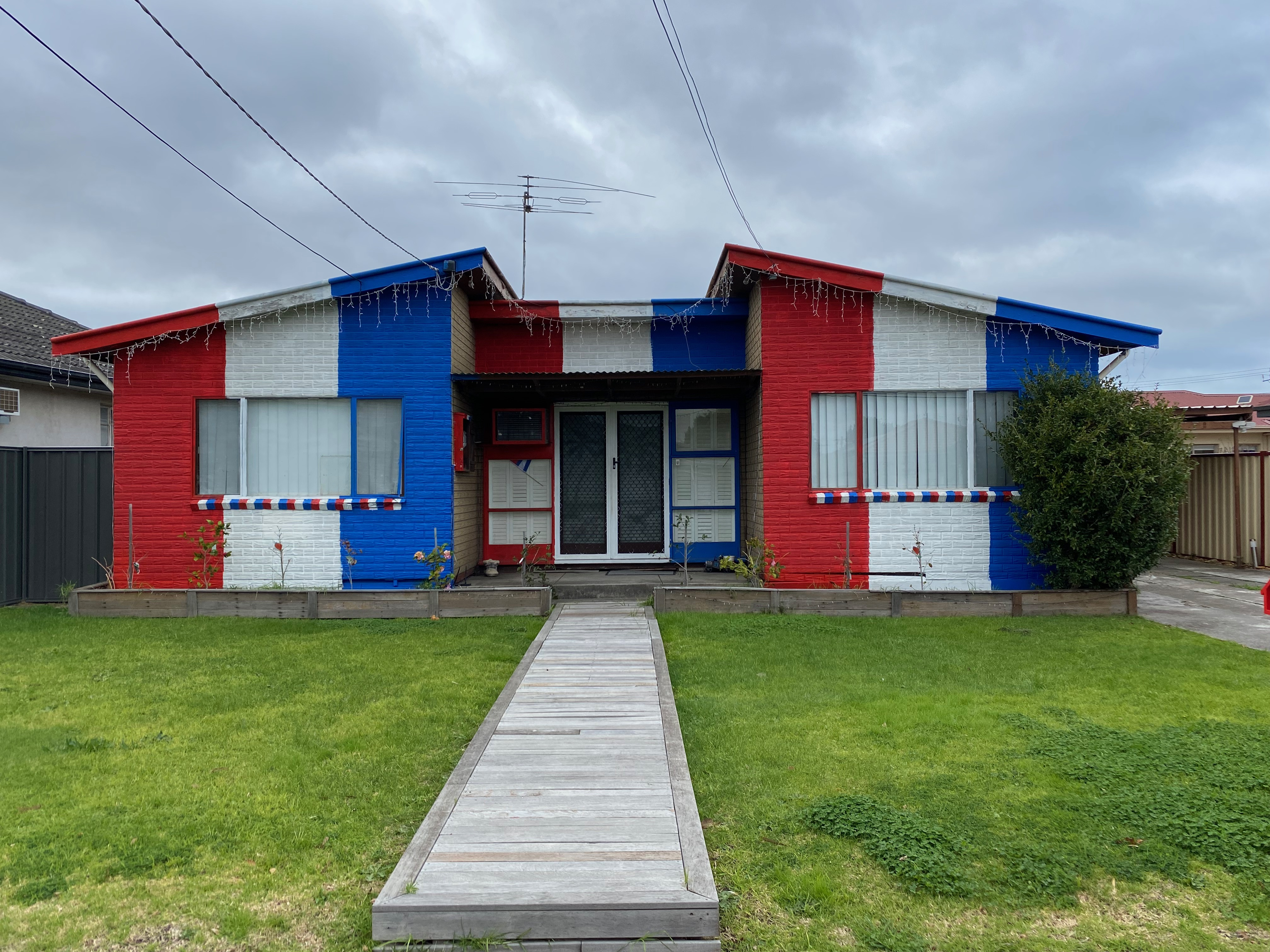
A home in Western Melbourne painted in the colours of the Western Bulldogs Football Club

Australian rules football culture is the cultural aspects surrounding the game of Australian rules football, particular to Australia and the areas where it is most popular. This article explores aspects and issues surrounding the game, as well as the players, and society. Australian Rules is a sport rich in tradition and Australian cultural references, especially surrounding the rituals of gameday for players, officials, and supporters.

== Popularity ==
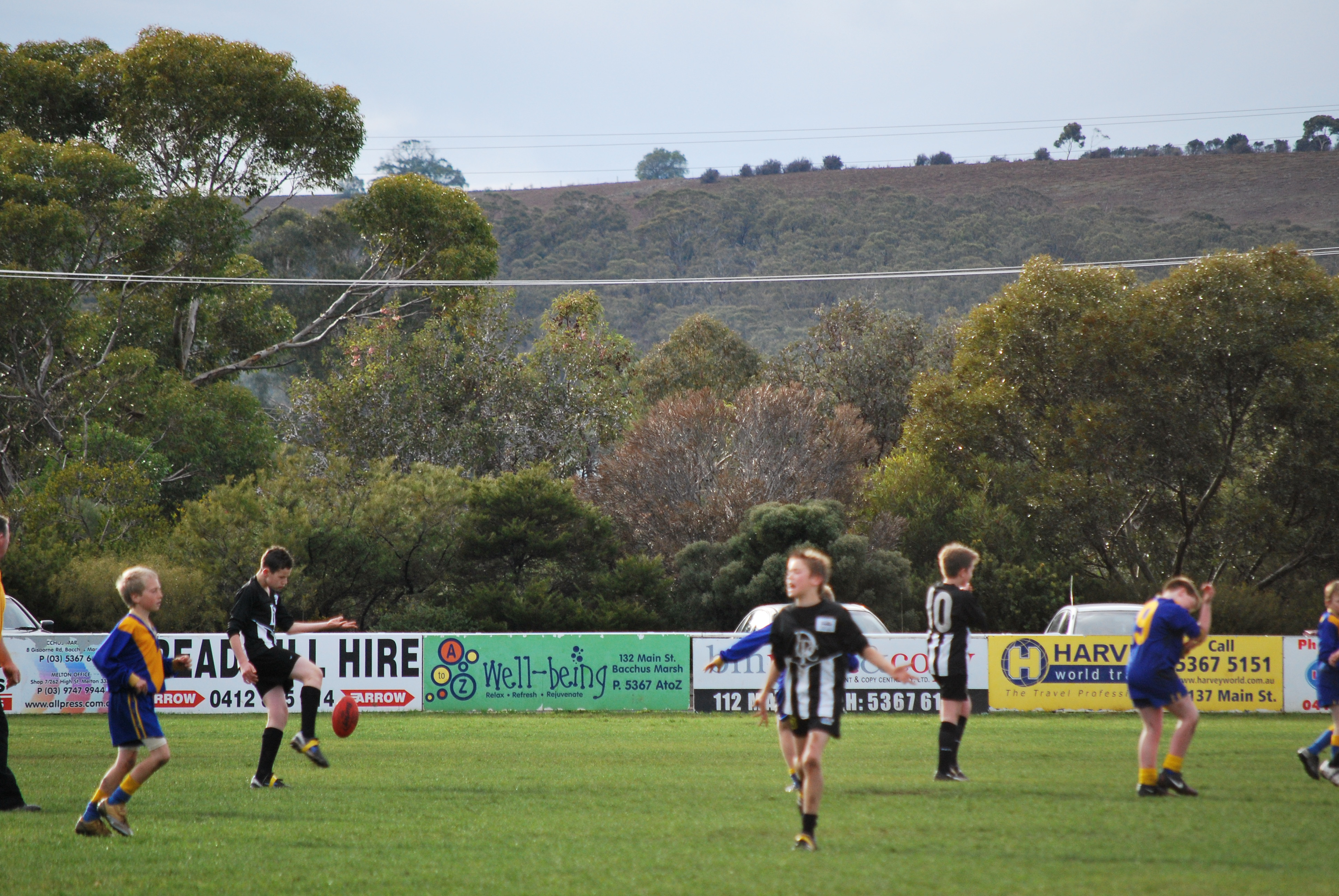
Australian rules football being played by children in Bacchus Marsh, Victoria.

Australian rules football has attracted more overall interest among Australians (as measured by the Sweeney Sports report) than any other football code, and, when compared with all sports throughout the nation, has consistently ranked first in the winter reports, and most recently third behind cricket and swimming in summer. In some of the southern states, it is the most popular of all sports.

As a football code, it is the most popular form of football in the Northern Territory, South Australia, Tasmania, Victoria and Western Australia. It is less popular in New South Wales, the Australian Capital Territory and Queensland, although there has traditionally been support for the code in regions within those states, such as parts of southern New South Wales including the Riverina and parts of Queensland such as Cairns and the Gold Coast. The AFL teams from Brisbane and Sydney attracted a strong increase in crowds and television audiences when they won four premierships between them from 2001–2005 (and appeared in Grand Finals between 2001 and 2006 inclusive), though crowds and TV ratings have both declined as both teams' performances (in particular the Brisbane Lions who have suffered a decline since losing the 2004 AFL Grand Final) in subsequent years dropped. Demographic and migration trends have affected all football codes in recent years, but most significantly Australian football in Queensland.

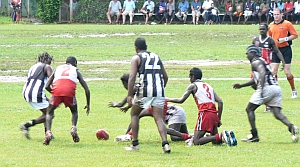
Australian rules football is popular amongst indigenous communities.

It is particularly popular amongst indigenous Australian communities. Indigenous Australians are well represented in professional AFL players: while only 2.4% of the population is of indigenous origin, 10% of AFL players identify themselves this way.

Australian rules is the national sport of Nauru.

=== Attendance ===
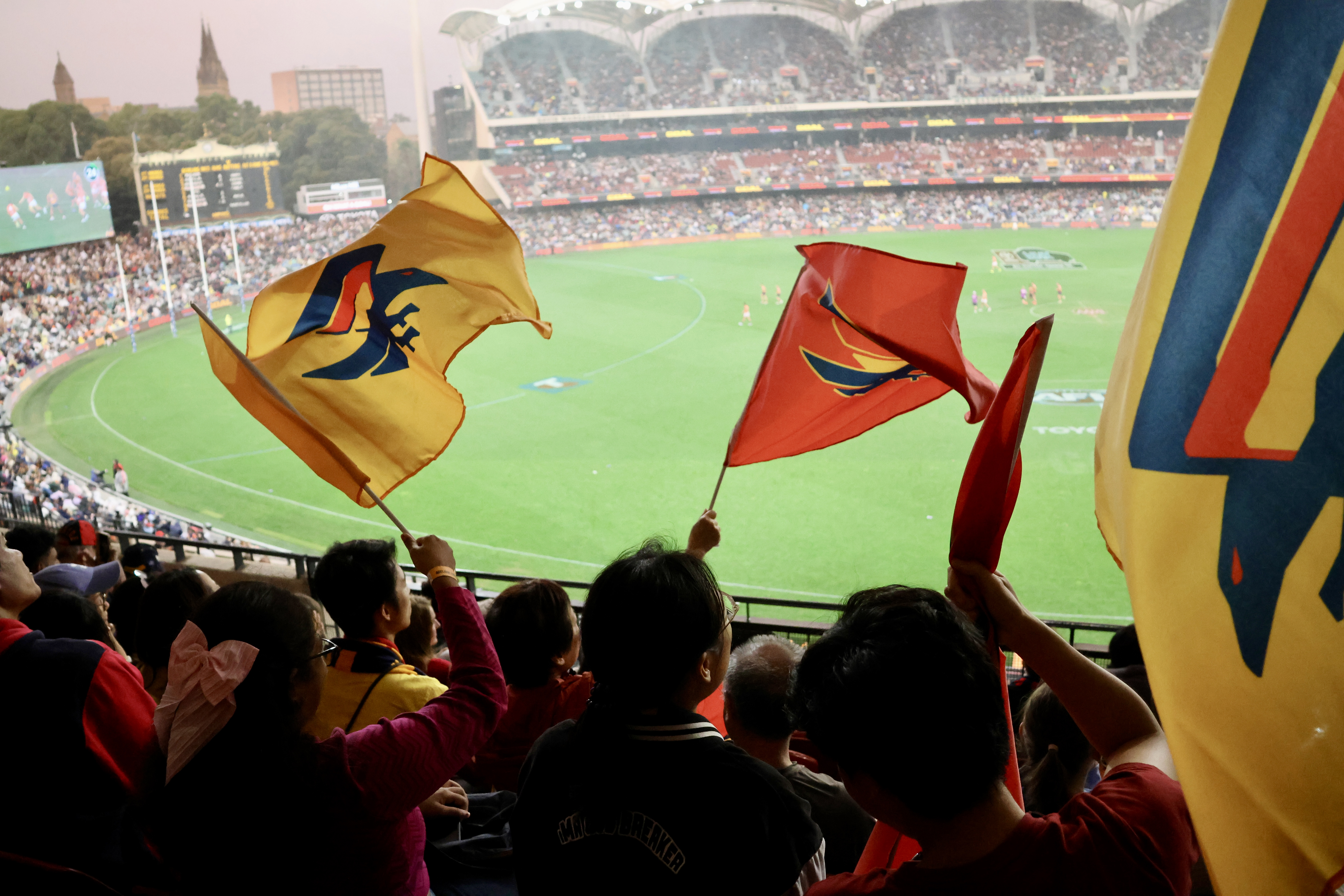
Spectators at Australian rules football matches sometimes demonstrate their support for a team by waving their flags, as seen here in this Australian Football League match between the Adelaide Crows and Greater Western Sydney Giants.

Australian rules football is the most highly attended spectator sport in Australia: government figures show that more than 2.5 million people attended games in 2005-06. In 2007 (including finals matches), a cumulative 7,049,945 people attended Australian Football League premiership matches, a record for the competition. In 2005, a further 307,181 attended NAB Cup pre-season matches and 117,552 attended Regional Challenge pre-season practice matches around the country.

As of 2005 the AFL is one of only five professional sports leagues in the world with an average attendance above thirty thousand (the others are the NFL in the United States and Major League Baseball in the U.S. and Canada, and the top division soccer leagues in Germany and England). In 2007, the average attendance of 38,113 made the AFL the second best attended domestic club league in the world, after only the NFL in the United States.

The Melbourne Cricket Ground is the largest stadium used for Australian rules football and the permanent home of the AFL Grand Final. It is one of the largest sporting stadiums in the world and was the venue for the record Australian rules football attendance of 121,696 at the 1970 VFL Grand Final, between Carlton and Collingwood - which game was also historic, in that it heralded the dawning of a new style of football - still largely in use today, wherein handballing was introduced more to commence the attack from the back line. Redevelopment since then to a mainly seated stadium has reduced the current capacity to approximately 100,000.

In addition to the national AFL competition, some semi-professional local leagues also draw significant crowds. Although crowds for state leagues have suffered in recent years, they continue to draw support, particularly for finals matches. The South Australian SANFL drew an attendance of 309,874 in 2006 and the Western Australian WAFL drew an official attendance of 207,154. Other leagues, such as the Victorian VFL Northern Territory Football League and the popular country league Ovens & Murray also charge admission and draw notable crowds (but with no available attendance figures).

Outside of Australia, the game has drawn notable attendances only for occasional carnival type events, such as International tests and exhibition matches.

=== Television ===
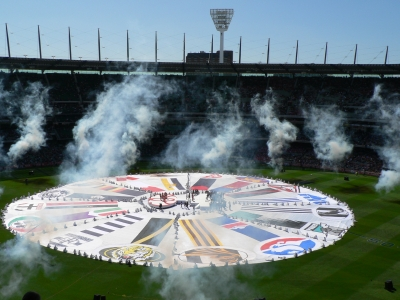
Part of the 2006 AFL Grand Final pre-match entertainment. The AFL Grand Final is one of the most watched sporting events on television in Australia.

The national AFL is the main league which is shown on television in Australia.

The 2005 AFL Grand Final was watched by a record television audience of more than 3.3 million people across Australia's five most populous cities—the five mainland state capitals—including 1.2 million in Melbourne and 991,000 in Sydney. In 2006, the national audience was 3.145 million, including 1.182 million in Melbourne and 759,000 in Sydney.

According to OzTAM, in recent years, the AFL Grand Final has reached the top five programs across the five biggest cities in 2002, 2003, 2004, 2005 and 2006. In 2007, it was #1 in metropolitan markets. Australian rules football has achieved a #1 rating in the sports category in both 2004 and 2005.

Some of the more popular regional leagues in Australia have the "match of the week" televised locally and free-to-air on ABC Television's respective state networks. The SANFL is the most popular of these regional competitions measuring a total of 1,415,000 television viewers in 2007.

Some of these regional leagues also attracted a national audience through free-to-air broadcasting on television networks such as ABC2. OzTAM began measuring these audiences in 2006. Despite a large number of complaints, ABC2 withdrew all of these broadcasts in early 2008. However in 2010 the ABC began replaying these matches nationwide, online via the new ABC iView catch-up TV service. In 2012, the ABC commenced screening replays of the previous weekends VFL, SANFL, WAFL matches in the early hours of the morning during the week from 3.00AM - 5.30AM (local time in each state) nationwide on the ABC1 channel

Australian rules also has a nominal but growing international audience. Since 2005, some AFL matches have been shown in the pacific rim region for the first time through the Australia Network. The AFL Grand Final is broadcast to many countries and attracts many million viewers worldwide. This audience has grown to approximately 30 million viewers from 72 countries.

According to Roy Morgan Research, more Americans watch Australian Rules Football than Australians. A poll taken between April 2002 and March 2004 showed that 7,496,000 North Americans compared to 7,004,000 Australians watch Australian Rules Football at least occasionally on television.

=== New media ===
The AFL website was the #1 most popular Hitwise Australian sports website in 2004, increasing in market share by 9.86% over that year. In 2006, other consistently high traffic websites in the Australian Top 20 included AFL Dream Team, (Trading Post) AFL Footy Tipping, BigFooty.com and Bomberland. In 2006, the search term 'afl' represented the highest number of search terms (2.48%) that delivered users to Hitwise sports category listed websites. Statistics show that Victorians consist of 43% of all visits to the AFL football category.

== Team rivalries ==
The AFL in encourages the building of rivalries between teams as one of the main drivers in generating passionate supporter bases and a method of increasing publicity for the league. Each year, one round is designated as a Rivalry Round, in which many of these match-ups are held during a set weekend. While some rivalries, such as those between teams from adjacent areas, are still strong, the designation of an entire round to promoting rivalries is often criticized due to arbitrary matchups, or the ignorance of stronger and more recent rivalries.

== Traditions of the game ==
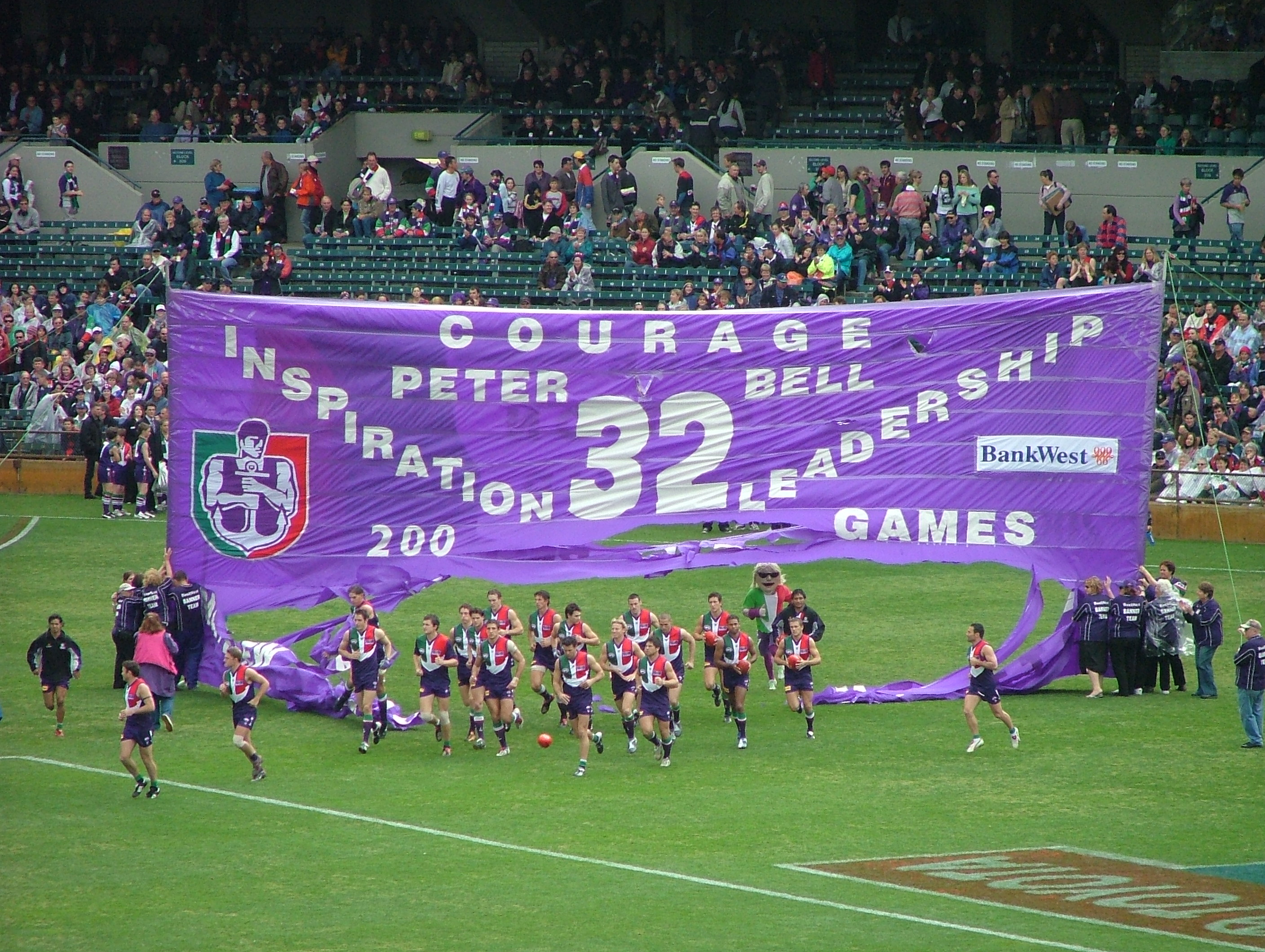
Before the start of each AFL games, players run through a banner constructed by supporters.

=== Clothing ===
As part of their uniform, players wear shirts called guernseys, often referred to colloquially as jerseys. Guernseys are similar to basketball shirts, but of a more robust design and tight fit. In the early period of the game's development players often wore sleeveless lace-up tops which gradually disappeared between the 1960s and early 1980s. A few players choose to wear a long sleeved variation of the modern guernsey design. Players wore full length pants, before adopting shorts in the 1920s. Tight-fitting shorts were a notable fashion trend in most leagues in the 1980s and some players began to wear hamstring warmers. A brief experiment with lycra by the AFL in the State of Origin series was quickly abandoned for more traditional wear. Long socks (football socks) are compulsory and boots with moulded cleats or studs for gripping the ground are worn (screw-ins have been banned from most leagues since the 1990s). Some players wear headbands or hair ties to keep the hair out of their faces when playing, though this is rare. Players will sometimes wear Black armband around their mid biceps and triceps, typically of electrical tape, in honour or in memoriam of someone related to the player or their club who recently died.

Traditionally, umpires have worn white and were sometimes derogatively referred to as "white maggots" amongst supporters. AFL umpires now wear bright colours to also avoid clashes with the player guernseys and AFL goal umpires now wear t-shirts and caps, rather than the traditional white coat and broad brimmed hat (similar to what was worn by many cricket umpires) which they wore before the 1990s.

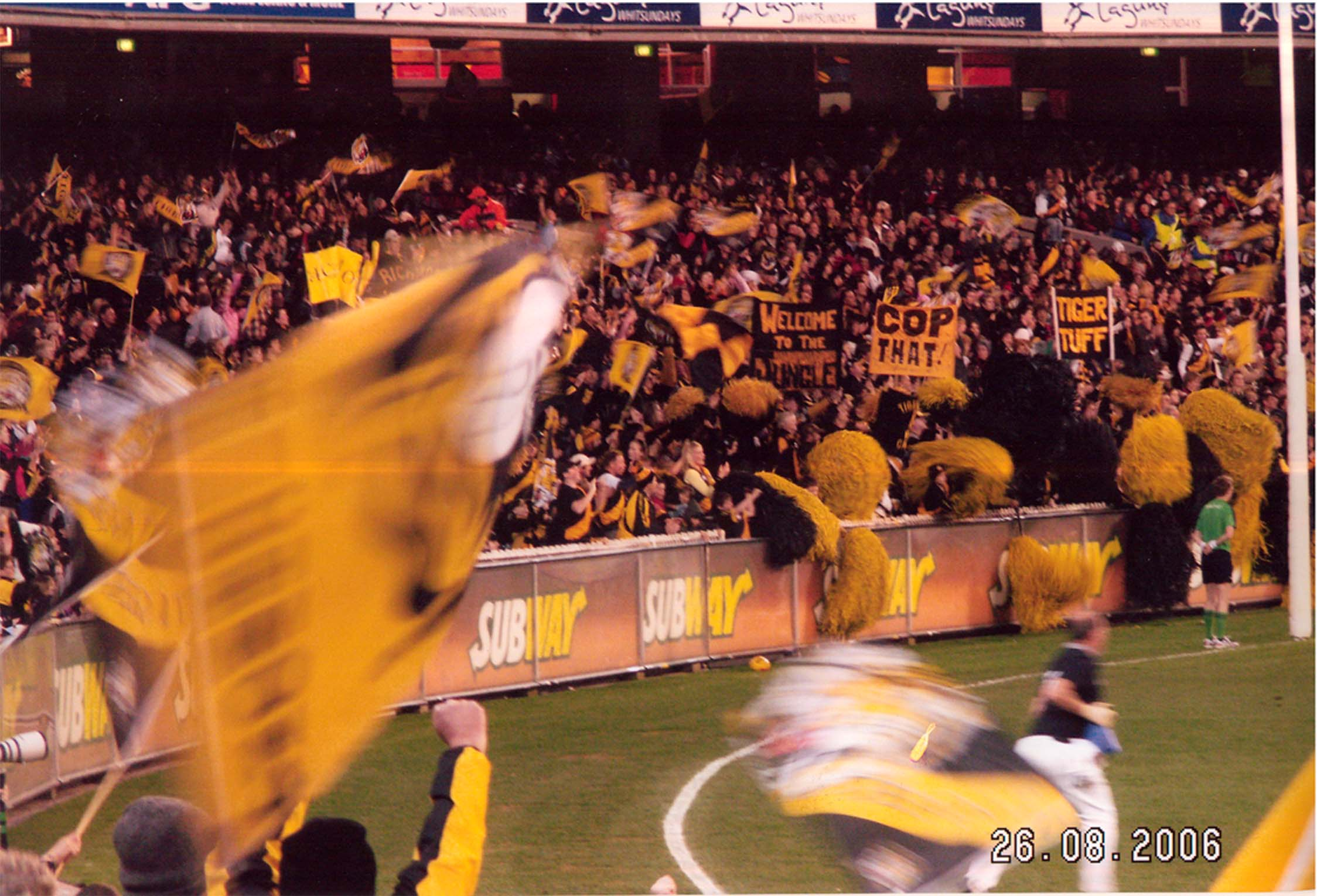
Cheersquads at Australian rules football matches behind the goals wave giant pom-poms or floggers to signify a goal

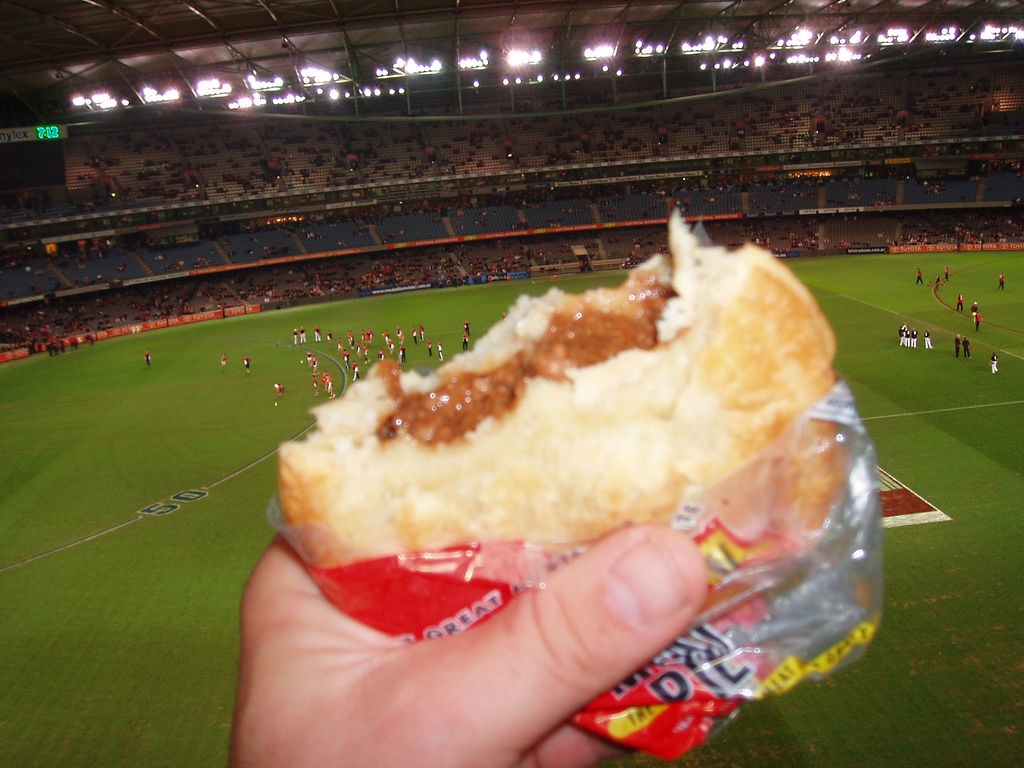
Meat pies are a tradition at Australian football games.

Typical supporter wear includes the team scarf and sometimes beanie (particularly in cooler climates) in the colours of the team. Team guernseys are also worn by supporters. Team flags are sometimes flown by supporters at the start of a game, when a goal is scored, and when their team wins.

=== Gameday and crowd ===
Before AFL matches, it is traditional for teams to run through a crêpe paper banner constructed by the cheersquads of each team. These often feature messages and slogans for the team in the context of the match, such as congratulating a player on a landmark number of games and more recently also sponsorship messages. The banners and sometimes also streamers are used in important local football matches such as finals. Some players are superstitious about running through the banner. As players run through the banners, the team's club song is always played. Calls for the banner to be scrapped have been met with condemnation from fans and players. The winning clubs song is also played at the end of each match.

In recent decades, for important matches, a Welcome to Country has become an important part of pre-match ceremony.

Australian rules supporters (or "barrackers") are said to "barrack" for their team, the Australian slang term originated in cricket in the 1870s but has become more widely used by football fans. The Collingwood Football Club song is the only one to reference the word barracker.

Though other cultures have had an influence at various points in its history, Australian football tends to have different atmosphere to sports like soccer and American football. Partly due to Australian culture, Australian rules spectators are generally more solitary animals. Despite loud shouting and arguing, crowd violence, at least in Australia, is rare and there is no segregation between fans. In contrast to most other football codes, since the sports's early days, half of all spectators are female. With the exception of small official cheersquads, spectators at Aussie Rules matches will rarely engage in support for their teams with organised chants. Instead, each individual spectator will most often shout their own support using the nickname of their team i.e. "Carn the Crows !" or "Carn the Maggies", or after goals perform simple chants such as "Ess-en-don! (clap-clap-clap)" or "Freo! Freo!". In contrast, cheersquads are highly organised, have their own rituals and almost always congregate behind the goals during games. The nature of the sport reflects this method of supporting. While some sports such as English or American football may involve lull periods where large chants reverberate around the ground, Australian rules football is played at a constant, frenetic pace, often leaving the crowd too immersed to take part in 'soccer style' chants. Most professional clubs have official cheersquads which will sometimes wave enormous coloured pompoms known as floggers after the umpire has signalled a goal. American style cheerleading is very rare.

Meat pies, beer and chiko rolls are popular consumables (sometimes noted as a tradition) for supporters at Australian rules matches. At AFL matches mobile vendors walk around the ground selling such pies, yelling out the well-known call of "hot pies, cold drinks!".

At AAMI Stadium in Adelaide; it is tradition to have a barbecue outside the stadium, in the carpark. Many families will bring their barbecues with them. This is particularly popular during the Sunday afternoon matches.

At the end of the match, it is traditional for a pitch invasion to occur. Supporters run onto the field to celebrate the game and play games of kick-to-kick with their families. In many suburban and country games, this also happens during quarter and half-time breaks. In the AFL in recent years, this tradition has been more strictly controlled with security guards to ensure that players and officials can safely leave the ground. At the largest AFL grounds, this tradition has been banned completely, to protect the surface, much to the discontent of fans. But most smaller regional & interstate grounds (Simonds Stadium & Sydney Showground Stadium, for example) still allow fans onto the field after the game. Sometimes a mid-game pitch invasion is expected for various highly anticipated landmark achievements (such as a player kicking a record number of goals).

Reading the AFL Record and recording the goals kicked by players alongside the team lists is also commonly done by spectators.

=== Imported culture ===
Over time, the leagues have experimented with importing traditions from other sports and overseas (mostly US culture) which had been successfully imported into other sports in Australia.

One example is American-style all female cheerleading which is absent from the game in Australia. In 1979, Carlton Football Club started a trend of the scantily clad "Carlton Blue Birds" which were for a time sponsored by Carlton fan Geoffrey Edelsten, however the Blue Birds disbanded in 1986. Nevertheless Edelston reinstated the idea when he bought the Sydney Swans with the "Sydney Swanettes" in 1986 Christopher Skase's Brisbane Bears employed the "Brisbane Bearettes" for several seasons from their 1987 debut season: the practice was seen as flashy and inappropriate by fans, and VFL clubs had abandoned their cheer squads after a few years. In 2014, Collingwood president Eddie McGuire flagged the reintroduction of Melbourne Storm style cheerleading, but with a gender diverse dance crew be introduced to the club though such a move was increasingly frowned upon by the public. The AFL in 2018 stated that it is unlikely to ever approve the reintroduction of cheerleaders.

With its growing popularity in soccer, the Mexican Wave made numerous appearances in AFL matches in the 2010s, along with soccer-like chants but generally fell out of favour after a decade with fans reluctant to start or continue the wave.

The AFL has experimented with Americanisation of the game in many ways since including its implementation of the much hyped AFLX format, an AFL Combine, Free Agency and Wildcard Series few of which have been popular with Australian fans.

== Injuries and prevention ==
Australian rules football is known for its high level of physical body contact compared to other sports such as soccer and basketball. High impact collisions can occur from any direction. Unlike gridiron, padding is not mandatory and is rarely worn. Combined with the range of activity including jumping, running, kicking, twisting and turning this means that injury rates are relatively high in comparison to other sports.

Some ruckmen wear shin pads and thigh pads and players with head injuries sometimes wear soft helmets. Mouthguards are worn by most players but are only compulsory in some leagues.

Soft tissue injuries are the most frequent, including injuries to the thighs, hamstring and calf muscles. Pre-game warm-up and stretching exercises are a focus of the standard preparation routine for clubs at all levels to minimise these injuries. Osteitis pubis is a condition which particularly affects Australian rules footballers. Injuries to the knee, ankle and shoulders are also common. Hospital-treated injuries, particularly for broken bones, account for 40 percent of all Australian rules football injuries.

Knee reconstructions are among the most commonly incurred career threatening injuries for both professional and amateur players, although professional players frequently continue to play after rehabilitation. Recently some professional players have undergone an innovative surgery that inserts a synthetic ligament in the knee which reduces the time out of football from twelve to three months.

Players can suffer head injuries; however, spinal injuries are extremely uncommon and comparatively much lower than rugby football.

In cases of injury, players are able to be treated whilst on the ground and umpires generally only stop the play when players are removed from the ground on a stretcher. Most leagues have implemented a blood rule which forces players with bleeding wounds to leave the field for treatment until the bleeding is stopped to prevent the transmission of blood-borne disease.

Australian rules football does not have the range or severity of health issues of American football however players have been known to die whilst playing Aussie Rules, though the most common cause is heart failure. The Victorian State Coroner reported five sudden deaths in that state among Australian rules footballers aged under 38 years between 1990-1997. Three of these deaths were attributed to Ischaemic heart disease (mean age, 31.7 years), and the other two to physical trauma.

In a study of retired VFL/AFL footballers found that the most common problems amongst the group in old age included arthritis, hip replacements and significantly reduced capacity to participate in athletic activity.

In recent years the AFL has commissioned official studies as well as introduced new rules and precautions aimed at reducing the number and severity of injuries in the sport, and there are variation games which significantly reduce the contact and risk of injury to players and allow players of any age to continue to participate.

== Women ==
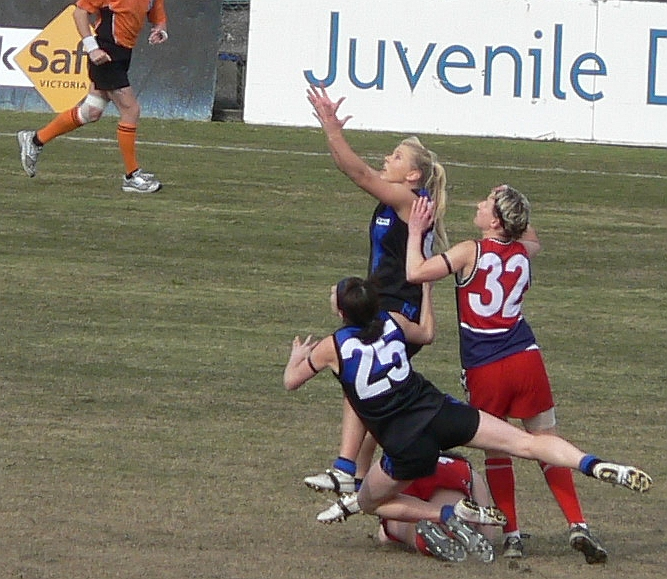
A Women's Australian rules football Match between the Melbourne University Mugars and the Darebin Falcons.

Women have been involved in Australian football since its inception, with many early match reports remarking on the equal representation of both sexes in the crowds. The trend continues with around half of modern day AFL supporters being female, which contrasts with other codes both in Australia and overseas. For instance, only 39% of NRL (rugby league) supporters in Australia are female.

There are women's footy players and umpires in the AFL.

== Popular culture ==
For many years, the game of Australian rules football captured the imagination of Australian film, music, television and literature.

The Club, a critically acclaimed 1977 play by David Williamson, deals with the internal politics of a Melbourne football club steeped in tradition. The play was adapted as a film, directed by Bruce Beresford and starring Jack Thompson and Graham Kennedy, in 1980.

Many songs inspired by the game have become popular, none more so than the 1979 hit "Up There Cazaly", by Mike Brady. Brady followed the hit up with "One Day in September" in 1987. Both are frequently used in Grand Final celebrations.

== AFL players and the media ==
Footballers' off-field behaviour is as highly scrutinised as their on-field behaviour. Footballers are held by many in Australia to be role models.

== Betting ==
"Footy tipping" is the term for office pools where players nominate which teams will win that week. It is part of the staple office environment in Australia.

Traditionally office pools are done with footy tipping posters, however with the modern age these private competitions can be managed by PC or mobile apps.

== Violence ==
=== Player violence ===
On-field assault has historically been socially tolerated in Australia, but, in recent years, this has changed with some players being charged by police for their on-field actions, including a recent jailing in Victoria and the much publicized case involving VFL player Leigh Matthews which ended the public perception that on-field football assaults are somehow legal. League penalties for such actions have also generally increased in recent years and overall violence has decreased over time.

Violence has also affected the International Rules Series, with the Irish team objecting to the level of violence tolerated by Australia.

== Multiculturalism ==
Australian rules football has involved a diverse section of society and the AFL has multicultural programs to engage people from different backgrounds.

== Racial vilification ==
The Australian Football League implemented a racial vilification code in an effort to stamp out racism in the sport. Despite that, there have still been numerous publicized incidents of racism in the sport.

1993

- Nicky Winmar reacted to overt racism from the crowd at Victoria Park, Melbourne, turning to face the offending segments of the crowd, lifted his Guernsey and defiantly pointed to his skin (at the end of a game between St Kilda Football Club and Collingwood Football Club). This act was captured in a series of famous photographs and led to far-reaching reform in the AFL in respect of racism in the game.

1994

- Essendon Football Club champion Michael Long complained to the Australian Football League over an alleged racial vilification incident involving Collingwood Football Club's Damian Monkhorst which was the result of an extensive investigation throughout 1995.

1997

- Sydney Swans player Robert AhMat was involved in an alleged racial vilification row with Essendon Football Club player Michael Prior.

2007

- The Herald Sun launches a special investigation into racism in junior Aussie Rules, revealing several controversial incidents.

2010

- Former Australian rules player Mal Brown apologises for referring to aboriginal Australian Football League players as "cannibals" and that he could not select Nicky Winmar or Michael Mitchell because "there were no lights" [at the poorly lit Whitten Oval] during a promotion for the E. J. Whitten Legends Game. The comments prompted AFL CEO Andrew Demetriou to express his disgust.

2011

- Joel Wilkinson racially vilified in multiple incidents, including by Brisbane Lions player Justin Sherman and by a Collingwood supporter in June 2012.
- Majak Daw racially vilified by Port Melbourne spectators.

2013

- Majak Daw, Daniel Wells and Lindsay Thomas allegedly racially vilified by spectators in a matches against Hawthorn and against the Western Bulldogs.
- Adam Goodes points to a Collingwood spectator in a match against Collingwood after an apparent "ape". The person later apologised to him.
- Video reveals Collingwood supporter racially vilifying both Adam Goodes and Lewis Jetta.
- Eddie McGuire apologises for "King Kong" gaffe in reference to Goodes.

2015

- Adam Goodes endured constant booing by spectators

2016

- A spectator threw a banana at Eddie Betts as he was playing for the Crows against Port Adelaide, as a form of racial abuse. (Note: A banana has long been used as a form of racial abuse in sport, originating in Europe and England in the 1980s. It is intended to imply that the target is a monkey.)

2019

- Two 2019 documentaries, The Final Quarter and The Australian Dream, using the Goodes controversy as a starting point, examine the role of racism in sport as well as more generally, racism in Australia, both historically and today. Following the release of the films, the AFL and individual clubs offered apologies to Goodes.

2023

- In April 2023, In April 2023, the AFL confirmed 23 reported incidents of racial abuse in AFL, VFL, and the Talent League games since the season began. Four Indigenous players – Brisbane's Charlie Cameron, Adelaide's Izak Rankine, and Fremantle's Michael Walters and Nathan Wilson – had received abuse over a period of two days.

== Player drug abuse ==
Performance enhancing drug abuse is also rare according to official studies despite some high profile recent cases and criticisms from the media and government of the AFL's own anti-doping code which allows players to test positive twice to recreational drugs and still continue to play and remain anonymous. This relaxed approach does not comply with the World Anti-Doping Agencyprotocols. The AFL code bans all drugs listed in World Anti Doping Code. The AFL also has an illicit drugs policy.
