= AFL Futures match =

Annual all-star Australian football game

- Other names: AFL All Stars Futures match
- Sport: Australian rules football
- First meeting: 2016
- Latest meeting: 2024
- Next meeting: 2026
- Broadcasters: AFL.com.au
- Stadiums: Melbourne Cricket Ground

Statistics
- Total meetings: 8

The AFL Futures match (currently known as the Marsh AFL National Futures Boys match under naming rights) is an annual all-star game between two representative sides consisting of the most talented under-17 Australian rules footballers. Organised by the Australian Football League (AFL) as part of its talent pathways program, the match is played as a curtain raiser to the AFL grand final. It was first contested in 2016 at Punt Road Oval on the morning of the AFL grand final; since 2018, the match has been played at the Melbourne Cricket Ground (MCG).

== Background ==
Underage representative football has its roots in the Teal Cup, which was first established in 1953 as a one-off match between of an under-18 Queensland representative team and an under-16 New South Wales representative team. The Teal Cup became an annual event from 1963 onwards; at the same time the age qualification was established as under-17. In 1973, the competition included teams outside of Queensland and New South Wales for the first time, and by 1979, all eight Australian states and territories were competing in what was the preeminent under-17 representative football event. The Teal Cup was rebranded as the AFL National Under 18 Championships in 1996, and thus under-17 representative football was limited at a higher level.

After almost two decades, under-17 representative football returned in earnest with the NAB AFL All Stars match taking place on the morning of the 2014 AFL grand final between an under-17 AFL Academy side and an under-18 Allies side. To that point, the AFL had not scheduled a curtain raiser match at the MCG on grand final day since 2007, which was the final time the TAC Cup (now known as the Talent League) held its decider on the Saturday morning. Teams would compete for the Kevin Sheehan Trophy, named after the former Geelong footballer turned national talent identification manager. The All Stars match was reprised the following year before the 2015 AFL grand final, where the Allies again defeated the AFL Academy.

== Concept ==
In 2016, the AFL decided to schedule two underage all-star games in the lead-up to the grand final, showcasing the best young football talent to both recruiters and the general public. Two teams, named after retired AFL stars Chris Judd and Michael O'Loughlin, would compete against each other in two age groups: the under-18s on the Friday following the parade, and the under-17s on the Saturday prior to the main event. In the days preceding the inaugural clash, the under-17 match was moved from the MCG to Punt Road Oval due to inclement weather raising concerns of surface deterioration before the feature match between Sydney and the Western Bulldogs. As was the case in the All Stars matches of 2014 and 2015, teams competed for the Kevin Sheehan Trophy, and a best-on-ground medal sponsored by NAB was awarded.

The dual-match format returned in 2017, this time with the under-18 All Stars match acting as the AFL grand final curtain raiser, and the under-17 match played on the Friday prior. However, this would be the final time the under-18 match would take place, as it was deemed an additional burden to players' increasingly full schedules ahead of the draft combine the following week. This allowed the under-17 All Stars Futures match to take centre stage on grand final day in 2018, and apart from its hiatus in 2020 and 2021 due to the COVID-19 pandemic, the match has remained as the MCG's curtain raiser each year since.

== Match history ==
=== 2016–2019: The first three years ===
The inaugural AFL Futures match was held in 2016. Team Judd were victors by 13 points over Team O'Loughlin, maintaining a slender lead at every break to take the win despite having less scoring shots. Team Judd, coached by outgoing AFL Academy mentor Brenton Sanderson, were led by strong performances from midfielders Lochie O'Brien (20 disposals, two goals) and Hunter Clark (21 disposals), while tall forward Darcy Fogarty was named best on ground. Jack Higgins finished with 24 disposals and a goal to be Team O'Loughlin's best, having gathered 16 touches to half-time.

Izak Rankine created headlines in 2017 when he lined up for both Team Enright and Team Harvey in the former's 39-point win at Kardinia Park. Played on the Friday prior to the AFL grand final for the only time in the match's short history, the South Australian draft prospect kicked two first-half goals for Team Enright to help them create a 45-point buffer at the long break. Ahead of the third quarter, Rankine was switched to the opposing team to even out the contest following numerous injuries to Team Harvey. He kicked a goal for his new side and inspired them to draw back within 24 points at three-quarter-time, and although the margin blew out once more in the final term, was gifted best-on-ground honours.

In 2018, potential number-one draft pick Matt Rowell was touted as a player to watch following his TAC Cup grand final best-on-ground medal performance for Oakleigh Chargers the week prior. As predicted, Rowell earned his second medal in as many weeks to lift Team Bartel to a 42-point win over Team Riewoldt, racking up 27 disposals and a goal in a best-on-ground display. Rowell's teammate Caleb Serong finished with an identical stat line, while Bigoa Nyuon led the goalkicking with three majors.

In 2019, Team Brown kicked 11 goals to four after half-time in 2019 to defeat Team Dal Santo by 41 points. The victors had six multiple goalkickers, led by best-on-ground medal winner Braeden Campbell with three majors, while captain Elijah Hollands gathered 24 disposals to go with his two goals.

=== 2020–2021: COVID-19 hiatus ===
The AFL Futures match went on hiatus in both 2020 and 2021 while the impact of the COVID-19 pandemic, particularly in Victoria, prevented large portions of underage football from being played. In each of these seasons, the AFL National Championships were also cancelled, resulting in precious little representative football opportunities for draft hopefuls.

=== 2022–present: The match returns ===
The match returned in 2022 with teams named after 2021 retirees Bachar Houli and Marc Murphy, who each gave mentoring sessions to the two squads in the lead-up to the game. Team Houli took advantage of a shockingly wasteful Team Murphy to run out winners by 28 points, with West Australian Daniel Curtin (20 disposals, eight marks) adjudged best afield. Team Murphy midfielder Caiden Cleary was the first player to top the 30-disposal mark in an AFL Futures match, amassing 31 touches and six inside-50s for the game.

The first AFL Futures match to be decided by under a goal took place in 2023, when Team Naitanui defeated Team Selwood by just three points. In a see-sawing encounter, Team Naitanui trailed at both quarter time and half-time, but grabbed the ascendancy in the third quarter and surged to a 27-point lead with 12 minutes remaining in the final term. Team Selwood, inspired by potential father–son selection Levi Ashcroft (26 disposals and a goal), then kicked four late goals to give their opponents to threaten a last-minute victory. Another potential father–son pick, Team Naitanui's Ben Camporeale (whose twin brother Lucas played on the opposing side), was awarded the best-on-ground medal for his 30-disposal, eight-mark performance.

== Records and statistics ==
=== Match results ===
List of results
Year	Winner	Runners-up	Score	Venue	Date	Ref.
2016	Team Judd	Team O'Loughlin	11.8 (74) d. 8.13 (61)	Punt Road Oval	Saturday 1 October 2016	
2017	Team Enright	Team Harvey	13.13 (91) d. 7.10 (52)	Simonds Stadium	Friday 29 September 2017	
2018	Team Bartel	Team Riewoldt	15.10 (100) d. 8.10 (58)	Melbourne Cricket Ground	Saturday 29 September 2018	
2019	Team Brown	Team Dal Santo	16.6 (102) d. 9.7 (61)	Melbourne Cricket Ground	Saturday 28 September 2019	
2020	No match played due to the COVID-19 pandemic in Victoria					
2021	No match played due to the COVID-19 pandemic in Victoria					
2022	Team Houli	Team Murphy	10.8 (68) d. 4.16 (40)	Melbourne Cricket Ground	Saturday 24 September 2022	
2023	Team Naitanui	Team Selwood	10.14 (74) d. 10.11 (71)	Melbourne Cricket Ground	Saturday 30 September 2023	
2024	Team Heppell	Team Sloane	9.16 (70) d. 9.9 (63)	Melbourne Cricket Ground	Saturday 28 September 2024	
2025	Team Boak	Team Docherty	14.5 (89) d. 11.10 (76)	Melbourne Cricket Ground	Saturday 27 September 2025	

=== Best-on-ground medal ===
The AFL Futures match currently presents dual medals to the individuals adjudged the 'best player' for each of the two competing teams. Prior to 2024, a single best-on-ground medal was presented; every medal winner throughout this era had represented the winning team.

==== Single medal presented (2016–2023) ====
List of winners
Year	Player	Team	Ref.
2016	Darcy Fogarty	Team Judd	
2017	Izak Rankine	Team Enright / Team Harvey (Note: Rankine played the first half of the match for Team Enright before switching to Team Harvey for the second half.)	
2018	Matt Rowell	Team Bartel	
2019	Braeden Campbell	Team Brown	
2020	No medal awarded		
2021	No medal awarded		
2022	Daniel Curtin	Team Houli	
2023	Ben Camporeale	Team Naitanui	

==== One medal per team presented (2024–) ====
List of winners
Year	Player	Team	Ref.
2024	Josh Lindsay	Team Heppell	
2024	Beau Addinsall	Team Sloane	
2025	Noah Williams	Team Boak	
2025	Cody Walker	Team Docherty	

=== Coaches ===
Each coach to have guided a team in a Futures match has generally been selected for their prior involvement with underage football, which often stems from their previous involvement with the game at the highest level. Prior to 2023, only Tony Bamford had not played in the AFL; indeed, every other coach had played at least 150 AFL matches. This trend has deviated in recent matches, with recently appointed specialist youth and academy team coaches now taking the reins more frequently.

Luke Power is the only person to have coached in a Futures match on two occasions, through his involvement in both 2018 and 2019.

List of coaches
Year	Coach	Team
2016	Brenton Sanderson	Team Judd
2016	Tadhg Kennelly	Team O'Loughlin
2017	Brad Johnson	Team Enright
2017	Peter Sumich	Team Harvey
2018	Tony Bamford	Team Bartel
2018	Luke Power	Team Riewoldt
2019	Luke Power	Team Brown
2019	Leigh Brown	Team Dal Santo
2020	No match played	
2021	No match played	
2022	Nick Davis	Team Houli
2022	Travis Cloke	Team Murphy
2023	Mark McVeigh	Team Selwood
2023	Andrew Sturgess	Team Naitanui
2024	Dale Eames	Team Heppell
2024	Ash Close	Team Sloane
2025	Sam Willatt	Team Boak
2025	Nick Cox	Team Docherty

== Impact and legacy ==
The AFL Futures match is typically seen as the strongest representation of the following year's draft class, with eye-catching performances in front of club scouts elevating players' recruiting potential. As of 2026, every best-on-ground medal winner bar 2023 medallist Ben Camporeale was selected in the first round of the AFL national draft in their first year of eligibility; three winners were taken within the first five picks.

Even mere representation in the two teams is a strong indicator of being selected in the following year's draft. Of the 52 players selected in the squads for the first AFL Futures match in 2016, 33 of those players went on to be drafted or selected by an AFL club at some point. This figure peaked in 2019, where 39 of that year's 48 listed players made it on to an AFL list, a success rate of more than 81 per cent.
