= Stadtbad Gotha =

Coordinates: 50.950092°N 10.695979°E

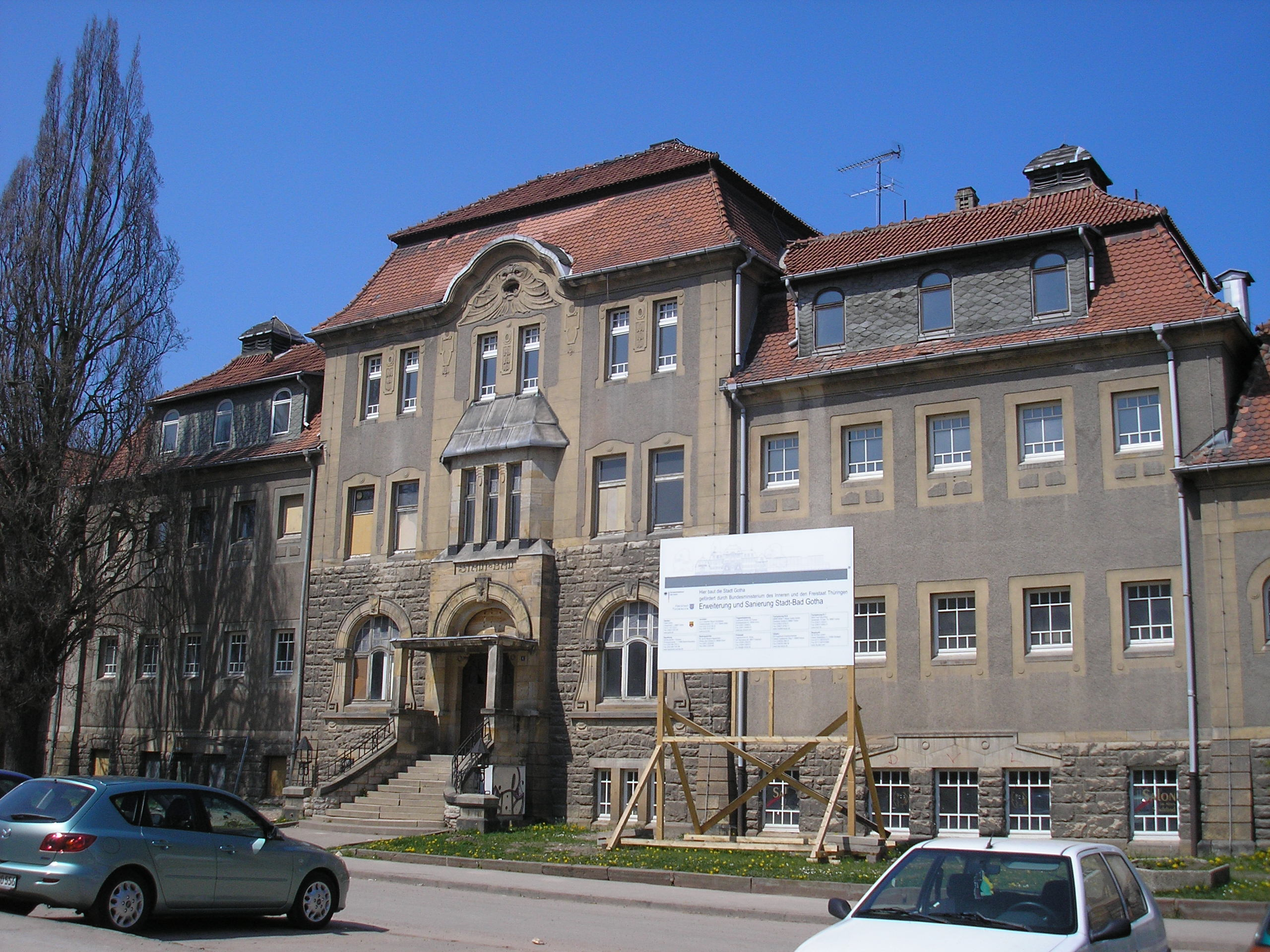
Stadtbad Gotha under renovation

Gotha Public Baths (German: Stadtbad Gotha) is a listed historical building of the Art Nouveau era. Centrally located on the northern fringes of Gotha’s old town, it was completed in 1909. After prolonged use, the original building was closed in the 1980s due to its dilapidated state. In 2007 the baths underwent a thorough restoration, modernisation and expansion programme, the resultant surface area being more than twice that of the original building. The baths were reopened in 2014.

== History ==
Gotha's historical Public Baths date back to 1905–09, a time when similar bathing facilities were being put up across Germany. Gotha's baths were designed and built under the supervision of Wilhelm Goette, the town's head of municipal planning. In common with public baths in other towns, those in Gotha consisted of a swimming hall, sauna as well as baths to wash in. The baths are Historicist in style, with strong Art Nouveau influences.

The restoration of the complex has created barrier-free facilities for families, schools and swimming clubs, as well as additional health and fitness and therapy treatments. As was the case in the original structure, the swimming hall remains at the heart of the complex. Other historical parts of the building, such as the domed sauna rooms, have been integrated into the modern design. A new sauna has been added, as have a competition-level 25 metre sports pool and a beginner's pool. Architect Nils Meyer, of Veauthier Meyer Architekten, Berlin, led the design and comprehensive renovation and extension of the baths, which received several architectural prizes. Arc Nova also carried out supervisory work and quality control.

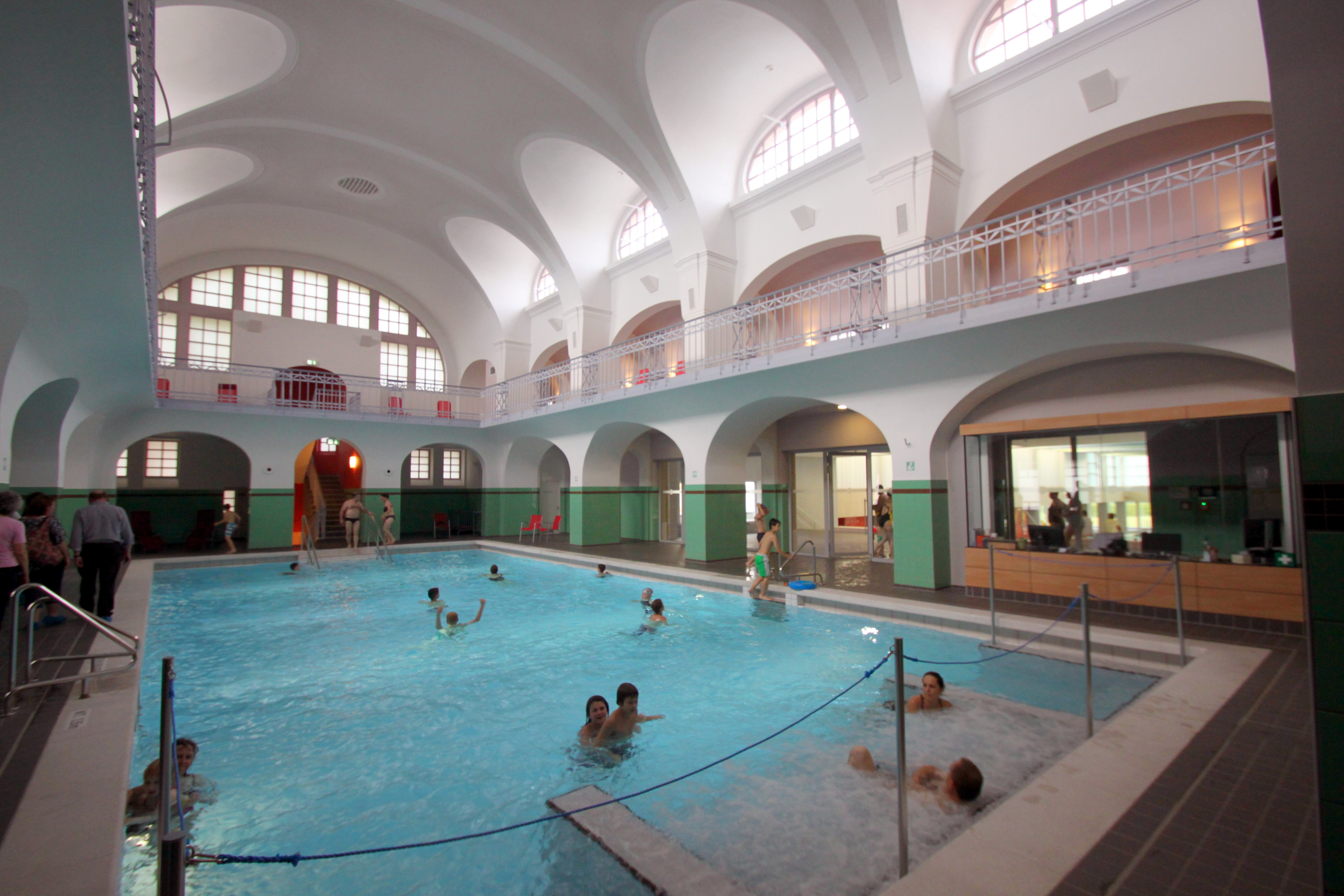
Swimming pool at the Stadtbad Gotha

While initial projections placed the cost at around 12 million euros, the final cost turned out to be around 19 million, making it the largest infrastructure project in Germany since German reunification; the project took 23 years to go from initial planning to final completion, and was organised by a team of 30 people.

== Layout ==
The extensions to Gotha's historical public baths have been designed in a clear but restrained architectural style. New parts of the building have been laid out in a linear fashion to the west and east of the historical swimming hall, which is set back from the historical building façade facing Bohnstedtstrasse.

Linked by a new large staircase, the interior's principal spaces comprise the historical swimming hall with therapy pools and the new swimming hall, with its beginner's and children's pools as well as its main pool for both competition and recreational use.

The main entrance to the original building on Bohnstedtstrasse remains the entrance to the newly restored baths. The oval vestibule, with its historical staircase and new lift, accesses both the upper floors and the changing area on the upper ground floor, from which the swimming pool can also be accessed.

Synthesising old and new into a unified whole proved a challenge in many regards, in particular bringing the old buildings up to today's standards in terms of structural engineering and building physics, as well as acoustic and energy requirements. The same was true of fire safety and, in particular, updating the pool's technical facilities. From a design standpoint, the challenge lay in creating contemporary interiors that nonetheless harmonised with the building's historical context. Lighting and the careful use of colour were an important means of achieving this.

The building extensions are of ferro-concrete construction. Ferro-concrete supports hold up pre-stressed, single-span concrete girders 20 metres wide and 1.4 metres high. The roof consists of plywood boards covered with insulated flat roofing material. Much care was taken to assess and restore the roof beams in the old buildings.
