= Bryan Beinke =

Australian rules footballer (born 1975)

Personal information
- Born: 5 August 1975 (age 51)
- Debut: Round 2, 3 April 1999, Adelaide vs. Hawthorn, at Waverley Park
- Height: 185 cm (6 ft 1 in)
- Weight: 87 kg (192 lb)

Playing career^{1}
Years	Club	Games (Goals)
1993–2003	Port Adelaide (SANFL)	107 (169)
1999–2002	Adelaide (AFL)	38 (42)
Total		145 (211)
- ^{1} Playing statistics correct to the end of 2005.

Career highlights
- 3x Port Adelaide SANFL premiership player (1996, 1998, 1999)

Bryan Beinke (born 5 August 1975) is a former Australian rules footballer in the Australian Football League.

== Football career ==
=== Port Adelaide ===
Playing primarily as a forward, Beinke initially played with South Australian National Football League (SANFL) club Port Adelaide before being drafted by Geelong Football Club with the 108th pick at the 1992 AFL draft. Beinke spent part of the 1993 AFL season with Geelong but did not play a senior game.

Beinke returned to Port Adelaide and played in their 1996 premiership side, winning the club's "Most Improved Player Award" but was not selected in Port Adelaide's initial AFL squad in 1997. He then spent the 1997 season in North Melbourne's reserves, playing 19 games in total. Beinke continued to play with the Port Adelaide Magpies in the SANFL, and following a successful 1998 season, where he won Port's Best and Fairest and the club Goal Kicking Award and played in Port Adelaide's Grand Final win,

During Beinke's time with the Adelaide Crows he continued to play with Port Adelaide in the SANFL when not required, winning his third premiership with Port Adelaide in 1999. Beinke played one more season with Port Adelaide in 2003.

=== Adelaide ===
Beinke was drafted by the Adelaide Crows at the 1998 AFL draft at pick 34. Beinke made his AFL debut for Adelaide in Round 2 1999, against Hawthorn Football Club at Waverley Park, eventually playing 38 AFL matches and kicking 42 goals before his delisting by Adelaide at the end of the 2002 AFL season.

== Coaching ==
Beinke signed with Hampden Football League club South Warrnambool as its playing coach in 2004.

In October 2011 it was announced that Beinke was returning to Alberton Oval to coach the Port Adelaide SANFL reserves.
