= Australian rules football in Australia =

Australian sport

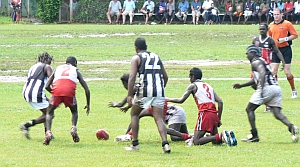
- Contesting for possession in an indigenous community football game in the Northern Territory
- Country: Australia
- Governing body: Australian Football League
- National team: Australia
- First played: 1858; 168 years ago in Melbourne, Victoria
- Registered players: 555,629 (2023)
- Clubs: 2,672

National competitions
- AFL; AFL Women's

Club competitions
- List: Northern Territory FL; South Australian NFL; Tasmanian FL (Defunct); Victorian FL; West Australian FL

Audience records
- Single match: 121,696 – Collingwood vs Carlton, at the MCG (1970 VFL Grand Final)
- Season: 8,243,908 – 2024 AFL season

In Australia, Australian rules football is the most popular spectator sport and the second most participated code of football. Since originating in Victoria in 1858 and spreading elsewhere from 1866, it has been played continuously in every Australian state since 1903 plus the two major territories since 1916. In most states it is referred to simply as just football or footy however in New South Wales and Queensland it is promoted under the acronym AFL by the local development bodies.

The sport is played by more than half a million Australians. Players participate at an organised level in various forms from Auskick (age 5) through to school-based, underage (up to age 19), open age, to Masters (35+) competition. The season runs in most states and territories during the cooler seasons in Australia (from March to September), avoiding clashes with cricket, with the exception being the northern part of the Northern Territory where the season runs during the wet season (October to March). The highest participation rates (players per capita) can be found in the Northern Territory (5%), South Australia (4.8%), Victoria (4.3%), Western Australia (4.2%), Tasmania (3.3%) and the Australian Capital Territory (2.4%). Unlike other football codes which are strongest in urban areas, Australian rules football has the highest participation in regional and remote areas. Nationally this rate is 5.7%, almost double that of any other code. It is also fast growing in New South Wales and in Queensland, though with participation rates there of 1.2% it is considered a minor sport, lagging behind soccer and rugby league in overall interest. These two states represent more than half of the Australian population and this dichotomy of football culture is referred to as the Barassi Line.

Australian rules football holds the match attendance record of any football code in Victoria (121,696), South Australia (66,987), Tasmania (24,968) and the Northern Territory (17,500).

The national professional competitions are the men's Australian Football League (AFL) and AFL Women's (AFLW). Nationally these are the most popular football competitions of any code, with millions of TV viewers across the country. The AFL governs the code nationally through the AFL Commission based in Melbourne. The AFL originated in Victoria and changed its name from Victorian Football League in 1990 after a successful program of national expansion and for these reasons the governing body is often seen by those from other states as having a strong Victorian bias.

The AFL discontinued representative matches as it expanded nationally (with the exception of occasional matches featuring Victoria). This was part of restructuring competitions across the country into a national junior pathway that would provide the league with access to the best junior talent via the Australian Football League draft. South Australia and Western Australia are the only states represented at the AFL Under 19 Championships, state representation is limited to players under 19, and open age players can only represent their state through interleague matches involving lower tier competitions.

The Australian Football Hall of Fame names the greatest players of all time. Of the greatest 32 who are categorised as Legends: 20 are Victorian, 4 each are from South Australia and Tasmania, 3 from Western Australia, 2 from New South Wales and 1 each from Queensland and the Australian Capital Territory.

Australia competed internationally at junior level. Australia's national teams remain undefeated. From 2007 to 2019 the underage men's team competed annually against international opponents as the AFL Academy most recently against New Zealand. Australia has also fielded amateur teams against South Africa, Papua New Guinea and the United States. Sides representing Indigenous Australia have competed against Papua New Guinea and South Africa.

== History ==
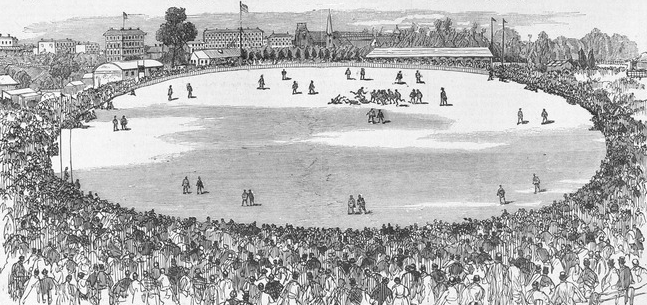
Engraving of the first intercolonial football match between Victoria and South Australia at the East Melbourne Cricket Ground, 1879

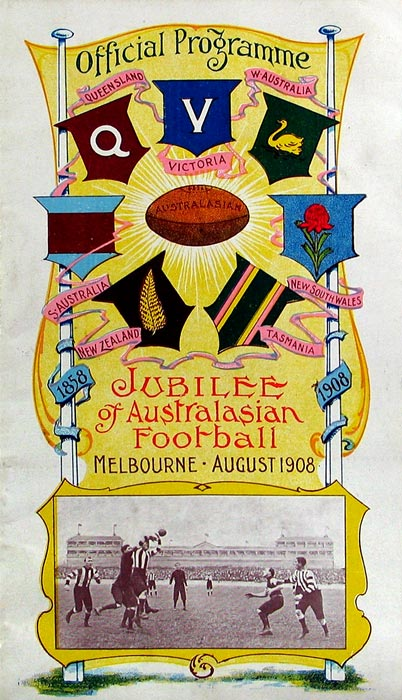
The first national interstate competition was held in 1908

It began in the Colony of Victoria in 1858, followed by the Colony of New South Wales and Colony of Queensland (1866); Colony of South Australia (1877); Colony of Tasmania (1879); and, Colony of Western Australia (1881).

The first intercolonial representative match was Victoria vs South Australia (1879).

Delegates representing the football associations of South Australia, Tasmania, Victoria and Queensland met in 1883 in order to standardise the rules across the colonies. The earliest governing body, the Australasian Football Council (later Australian National Football Council) dates back to this time.

Following a hiatus in Queensland (1892-1903) and New South Wales (1893-1903) it was revived after the Federation of Australia and expanded to the territories of the Australian Capital Territory (1911) and the Northern Territory (1916).

== In Australian popular culture ==
The sport has had a significant impact on popular culture in its native Australia, capturing the imagination of Australian film, art, music, television and literature.

== Audience ==
=== Attendance ===
Football is the most highly attended spectator sport in Australia. Government figures show that more than 2.5 million people (16.8% of the population) attended games in 1999. In 2005, a cumulative 6,283,788 people attended Australian Football League (AFL) premiership matches, a record for the competition. A further 307,181 attended NAB Cup pre-season matches and 117,552 attended Regional Challenge pre-season practice matches around the country. As of 2010, the AFL is one of only five professional sports leagues with an average attendance of over 30,000 per game.

As well as the AFL attendances, strong semi-professional state and local competitions also draw crowds. The South Australian SANFL drew an attendance in 2008 of 362,209 with an average of 3,773 per game, while the Western Australian WAFL drew an attendance of 219,205 with an average of 2,332 per game.

Region/State/Territory	Average AFL premiership season attendance (since 1990 as at 2023)
New South Wales	24,207
(Victoria (state)) Victoria	38,116
Queensland	19,658
Western Australia	34,462
South Australia	35,919
Tasmania	14,206
Australian Capital Territory	10,989
Northern Territory	9,320

==== 2025 ====
In the 2025 league season, 16 Australian football clubs recorded an average home league attendance of at least 20,000:

#	Club	Average
1	Collingwood	67,104
2	Carlton	48,521
3	Fremantle	45,758
4	Adelaide	45,533
5	West Coast	42,576
6	Richmond	41,534
7	Hawthorn	41,479
8	Essendon	40,034
9	Melbourne	37,499
10	Port Adelaide	36,565
11	Geelong	35,439
12	Western Bulldogs	34,470
13	Sydney	34,277
14	Brisbane Lions	30,598
15	St. Kilda	29,776
16	North Melbourne	23,961

=== Television ===
According to OzTAM, in recent years, the AFL Grand Final has reached the top five programs across the five biggest cities in 2002, 2003, 2004, 2005 and 2006. Australian rules football has achieved a #1 rating in the sports category in both 2004 and 2005.

== Participation ==
Adult players
Region/State/Territory	2016	2022/23	2023/24
(Australia) National	496,829	555,629	562,063
New South Wales	51,177	71,481	80,572
(Victoria (state)) Victoria	209,117	235,970	227,213
Queensland	47,274	56,935	51,941
Western Australia	82,701	95,407	108,154
South Australia	74,806	69,868	63,969
Tasmania	15,732	14,528	13,927
Australian Capital Territory	7,504	8,326	9,129
Northern Territory	8,519	9,743	7,158

== Structure and competitions ==
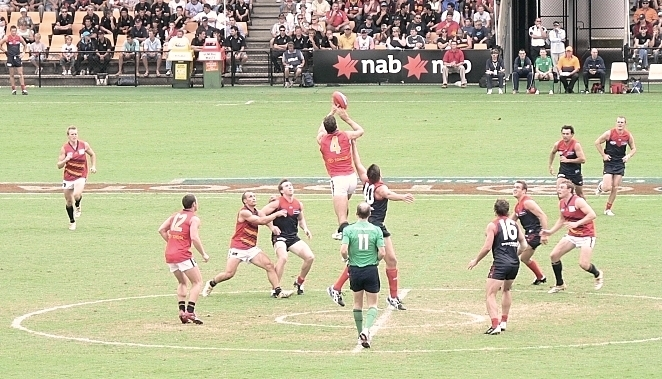
An Australian Football League match at Carrara Stadium on the Gold Coast. Adelaide's Matthew Clarke and Melbourne's Mark Jamar contest a centre bounce. The man in the green shirt is a central field umpire.

The most powerful organisation and competition within the game is the elite professional Australian Football League (AFL). The AFL is recognised by the Australian Sports Commission as being the National Sporting Organisation for Australian rules football. There are also seven state/territory-based organisations in Australia, most of which are affiliated to the AFL. Most of these hold annual semi-professional club competitions while the others oversee more than one league. Local semi-professional or amateur organisations and competitions are affiliated to their state leagues.

Region	Overview	Governing/Development body	Major competition(s)
Australian Capital Territory	Overview	AFL NSW/ACT	AFL Canberra
New South Wales	Overview	AFL NSW/ACT	Sydney AFL
Northern Territory	Overview	AFL Northern Territory	Northern Territory Football League
Queensland	Overview	AFL Queensland	Queensland Australian Football League
South Australia	Overview	South Australian Football Commission	South Australian National Football League
Tasmania	Overview	AFL Tasmania	Tasmanian Football League
(Victoria (state)) Victoria	Overview	AFL Victoria	Victorian Football League
Western Australia	Overview	WA Football	West Australian Football League

=== National championships ===
==== Senior ====
The last senior national carnival was held in 1993 and the last match between interstate senior sides was held under State of Origin rules in 1999. Senior state representation for Australian Football League players is no longer available except for Victoria whose players sometimes compete in one-off events against composite sides. However, state leagues continue to compete in inter-league matches.

==== Under 18 ====
The AFL Under 18 Championships are the annual national Australian rules football championships for players aged 18 years or younger and includes teams from each Australian state or Territory. The competition is monitored by AFL recruiters and frequently seen as the second biggest pathway for junior players to the fully professional Australian Football League. The competition is currently sponsored by the National Australia Bank (NAB). The competition receives an increasing amount of coverage in the media, however still lags behind the TAC Cup in terms of interest in Victoria.

== AFL players' Australian State of Origin ==
AFL player states of origin based on junior participation.

Region/State/Territory	AFL Players (2019)
New South Wales	47
(Victoria (state)) Victoria	483
Queensland	33
Western Australia	101
South Australia	101
Tasmania	23
Australian Capital Territory	4
Northern Territory	10

== See also ==
- Australian Football League
- Australian Institute of Sport
- List of Australian rules football clubs in Australia

== Books ==
- Blainey, Geoffrey (2010). A Game of Our Own: The Origins of Australian Football. Black Inc. ISBN 9781863954853.
- Coventry, James (2015). Time and Space: The Tactics That Shaped Australian Rules and the Players and Coaches Who Mastered Them. HarperCollins. ISBN 978-0-7333-3369-9.
- de Moore, Greg (2011). Tom Wills: First Wild Man of Australian Sport. Allen & Unwin. ISBN 978-1-74237-598-4.
- Hess, Rob (2008). A National Game: The History of Australian Rules Football. Viking. ISBN 978-0-670-07089-3.
- Hess, Rob; Lenkic, Brunette (2016). Play On! The Hidden History of Women's Australian Rules Football. Bonnier Zaffre. ISBN 9781760063160.
- de Moore, Greg; Hess, Rob; Nicholson, Matthew; Stewart, Bob (2021). Australia's Game: The History of Australian Football. Hardie Grant Books. ISBN 9781-74379-657-3.
- Hibbins, Gillian; Mancini, Anne (1987). Running with the Ball: Football's Foster Father. Lynedoch Publications. ISBN 978-0-7316-0481-4.
- Hibbins, Gillian (2008). "Men of Purpose". In Weston, James (ed.). The Australian Game of Football: Since 1858. Geoff Slattery Publishing. pp. 31–45. ISBN 978-0-9803466-6-4.
- Hibbins, Gillian (2013). "The Cambridge Connection: The English Origins of Australian Football". In Mangan, J. A. (ed.). The Cultural Bond: Sport, Empire, Society. Routledge. pp. 108–127. ISBN 9781135024376.
- Nauright, John; Parrish, Charles (2012). Sports Around the World: History, Culture, and Practice. ABC-CLIO. ISBN 9781598843002.
- Pennings, Mark (2012). Origins of Australian Football: Victoria's Early History: Volume 1: Amateur Heroes and the Rise of Clubs, 1858 to 1876. Connor Court Publishing Pty Ltd. ISBN 9781921421471.
- Pippos, Angela (2017). Breaking the Mould. Simon and Schuster. ISBN 9781925475296.
- Williamson, John (2003). Bucknell, Mar (ed.). Football's Forgotten Tour: The Story of the British Australian Rules Venture of 1888. Applegate. ISBN 9780958101806.
