= Tony Bamford =

Playing career
Years	Club	Games (Goals)
1996–2003	Port Adelaide Magpies	78 (58)

Career highlights
- 3× SANFL premiership player (1996, 1998, 1999)

Anthony D. Bamford is a retired Australian rules footballer who played for the Port Adelaide Football Club in the South Australian National Football League.
