= Darryl Poole =

Australian rules footballer

Personal information
- Full name: Darryl J. Poole
- Born: 1 April 1972 (age 54)
- Original team: Port Adelaide (SANFL)
- Height: 195 cm (6 ft 5 in)
- Weight: 107 kg (236 lb)
- Position: Ruckman

Playing career^{1}
Years	Club	Games (Goals)
1997–1999	Port Adelaide (AFL)	24 (11)
1991–2003	Port Adelaide (SANFL)	86 (29)
- ^{1} Playing statistics correct to the end of 2003.

Darryl Poole (born 1 April 1972) is a former Australian rules footballer who played for Port Adelaide in the Australian Football League (AFL).

Poole, a ruckman who was also used as a tall forward, started his career in the South Australian National Football League (SANFL) at Port Adelaide where suspension cost him a place in the 1996 premiership side.

He was a member of the inaugural Port Adelaide squad which entered the AFL in 1997 and he took part in their opening round loss to Collingwood at the Melbourne Cricket Ground, contributing two goals. Poole's AFL career was hampered by a groin injury and he spent most of 1999 in the SANFL where he claimed Port's 'Best and Fairest' and won the Jack Oatey Medal for his performance in the Grand Final win that year.

Poole was delisted from the Power at the end of the year but continued playing with the Port Adelaide Magpies, as captain from 2000 to 2003.
