= Phil McGuinness =

Australian rules footballer

Personal information
- Born: 30 May 1971 (age 55)
- Height: 178 cm (5 ft 10 in)
- Weight: 78 kg (172 lb)

Playing career
Years	Club	Games (Goals)
1991–1995	Glenelg (SANFL)	88 (91)
1996–2002	Port Adelaide (SANFL)	134 (177)
Total		222 (268)

Career highlights
- Port Adelaide best and fairest (SANFL) (2000); 2x Port Adelaide premiership player (SANFL) (1996, 1999)

Phil McGuinness (born 30 May 1971) is a former award-winning Australian rules footballer who played for Glenelg and Port Adelaide in the South Australian National Football League (SANFL).

McGuinness began his career at Glenelg in 1991 and switched to Port Adelaide in 1996. McGuinness was quite successful in that club's Best and Fairest, being runner-up in 1999 and then in 2000 winning the award.

McGuiness is the brother of former Adelaide Football Club captain Tony McGuinness.
