= Brett Chalmers =

Australian rules footballer, born 1973

Personal information
- Full name: Brett Chalmers
- Born: 23 April 1973 (age 53)
- Original team: Port Adelaide (SANFL)
- Height: 195 cm (6 ft 5 in)
- Weight: 94 kg (207 lb)

Playing career^{1}
Years	Club	Games (Goals)
1991–92, 94–99	Port Adelaide (SANFL)	120 (47)
1993	Collingwood	0 (0)
1994–1997	Adelaide	50 (8)
1998–1999	Port Adelaide	25 (12)
Total		195 (67)
- ^{1} Playing statistics correct to the end of 1999.

Career highlights
- 4x Port Adelaide (SANFL) premiership player (1992, 1994, 1998, 1999); Jack Oatey Medal 1998

Brett Chalmers (born 23 April 1973) is a former Australian rules footballer who played in the Australian Football League.

Originally from Cleve in Port Adelaide's country zone, Chalmers was a highly rated player from his early teens, playing for the South Australian State Schoolboys Under-15s in 1988. He was drafted at sixteen to the VFL/AFL by the Richmond Football Club with the No. 103 selection in the 1989 VFL draft. By this time, Chalmers had already played some games for the Port Adelaide thirds, but never even considered going to Punt Road. He remained in the South Australian National Football League (SANFL) for the next three years, making his senior debut for the SANFL Magpies in 1991 and representing the league the following season, at whose end he had played 42 senior games.

Frustrated by their failure to convince Chalmers to join the club, and with their hold expiring with the 1992 AFL National Draft, Richmond attempted to trade Chalmers to numerous other AFL clubs, most notably St. Kilda and Hawthorn. Chalmers insisted he would play in the AFL only with Collingwood — with whom Richmond were implacably opposed to doing any deal because they believed doing so constituted subverting the draft — although when drafted Chalmers announced he would not join Collingwood until 1994. It soon emerged that Chalmers had engaged in draft tampering: in an attempt to get to Collingwood, he had contacted most other AFL clubs and told them that he would remain in the SANFL if another club drafted him. In May 1993, Chalmers admitted his guilt, and in response, the AFL issued Chalmers a huge $30,000 fine, and made him ineligible to play for Collingwood for three years.

Consequently, Collingwood traded Chalmers to Adelaide. He played four seasons for the Adelaide Crows, during which he was affected by a succession of injuries, then two seasons for the Port Adelaide Power. He totalled 75 AFL games, but continued to play for the SANFL Magpies when recovering from injury or losing form.

== Personal life ==
Chalmers is the father of Olympic gold medallist swimmer Kyle Chalmers.
