= March Madness pools =

Form of sports betting in the United States

March Madness pools are a form of sports betting based on the annual NCAA Division I men's basketball tournament each spring in the United States. The annual tournament bracket can be completed online or printed out and completed by hand whereby, prior to the tournament, participants predict the outcome of each tournament game. Each participant's predictions are compared against the others in a given pool. Various scoring systems exist to award points for correct predictions, and various alternative games related to March Madness predictions exist. Tens of millions of brackets are filled out each year. Due to the size of the tournament and its proclivity for upsets, a perfect bracket has never been achieved.

== Background ==
=== Tournament bids ===
The tournament field comprises 68 teams who play NCAA Division I college basketball. Among the field, 31 automatic bids are given to winners of each conference, usually via a season-ending conference tournament. The other 37 teams receive at-large bids from a selection committee. The process of selecting at-large bids involves subjective judgment of teams' performance over the course of the season, and can be controversial.

=== Seeds ===
The four lowest ranked automatic bid teams and the four lowest ranked at-large teams in the tournament play in special play-in games called the First Four at the start of the tournament. The rest of the field is split into four regions of 16 teams, and those regions are seeded from 1 to 16. The top team in each region plays the 16th team, the second plays the 15th and so on. The field plays a 6-round single-elimination tournament, in which a single loss ends a team's chances of becoming champions.

=== Timeframe ===
The tournament takes place over three weekends starting with "Selection Sunday" in mid-March and concluding with the semifinals and championship game (Final Four), usually held on the first weekend of April.

== Brackets ==
The March Madness bracket is the visual representation of all the teams in the tournament and the path they have to follow to the Final Four and the championship game. There are pools or private gambling-related contests in which participants predict the outcome of each tournament game, filling out a complete tournament bracket in the process. Various scoring systems exist to award participants for correctly predicting the results of March Madness games. Some pools or contests are free to enter, while others require an entry fee.

=== Odds of a perfect bracket ===
Completing a bracket by predicting the winners of 63 games is a difficult task that has not been recorded as accomplished. Different methods are used to estimate the probability of a perfect bracket.

There are 2^{63} or 9,223,372,036,854,775,808 unique combinations of winners in a 64-team bracket, meaning that without considering seed number, the odds of picking a perfect bracket are about 9.22 quintillion to 1. Other estimates of the chance of a perfect bracket, accounting for tournament trends (such as higher seeds typically being expected to win), have ranged from 1 in 576 quadrillion to 1 in 128 billion. The longest a bracket has stayed perfect is 49 games in 2019. The streak encompassed the entire Round of 64 and Round of 32 before the first incorrectly predicted result occurred in the Sweet 16 round. Of note, the 2019 tournament was marked by relatively few upsets.

== Popularity ==
March Madness is one of the most popular sporting events in the United States. In 2023, Sports Illustrated reported that an estimated 60 to 100 million brackets are filled out each year. There are numerous prizes given by companies for anyone who can predict every game in the bracket, thereby increasing interest in the practice. Warren Buffett has publicly offered $1 billion for a perfect bracket. Kalshi followed suit with the same offer in 2026. Mainstream media outlets such as ESPN, NCAA.com, CBS Sports, Fox Sports, and MGM host free-entry tournaments online where contestants can obtain cash prizes up to $2 million. Employers have also noticed a change in the behavior of employees during this time: they have seen an increase in the number of sick days used, extended lunch breaks and even the rescheduling of conference calls to allow for more tournament watching. Many handicappers and pundits offer advice for winning one's bracket pool.

== See also ==
- Betting pool
