= Betting pool =

Form of gambling

A betting pool, syndicate, sports lottery, sweep, or office pool if done at work, is a form of gambling, specifically a variant of parimutuel betting influenced by lotteries, where gamblers pay a fixed price into a pool (from which taxes and a house "take" or "vig" are removed), and then make a selection on an outcome, usually related to sport. In an informal game, the vig is usually quite small or non-existent. The pool is evenly divided between those that have made the correct selection. While historically there are no odds displayed; each winner's payoff (or odds) is a simple calculation dividing the pool less takeout by the number of winners. (The only major difference from true pari-mutuel betting is that it allows for variable wager amounts.)

Betting pools are not connected only to sports, as there are topics such as deaths and births which people can bet on. Death pools usually involve well-known individuals, such as celebrities and sports figures, which the participants predict will die within a certain period of time. On the other hand, birth pools involve individuals picking specific dates in which someone, who can be either a celebrity or friend, gives birth.

== Today ==
Today in England, sports lotteries are more commonly referred to as football pools. American sports lotteries often do not require contestants to purchase a lottery ticket or make an initial wager. Hockey pools are common in North America, and footy tipping in Australia.

In the United States the most popular type of betting pool is the March Madness pools. Leading up to the NCAA Men's Division I Basketball Championship, contestants fill out forms that predict who will win. In 2013 it was estimated that 58 million Americans participate in the contest every year. There are also many handicappers and pundits which offer advice for winning your bracket. Another popular type of betting pool is the college football bowl game. Millions of people bet on the winners of all 39 bowl games every year. There are also notable sport betting pools across the globe such as Hollywoodbets, American Totalisator, Sport Select and others.

A traditional betting pool takes place during the Super Bowl, where entrants make random picks for the score of the game. These entries are known as "squares" where players either pick or are assigned a cell in a 10 by 10 grid. Then after the grid is filled, the rows and columns are assigned a digit (0-9) which corresponds to the final number in the score of each team. The player with the correct combination wins, and prizes may be paid out for having the correct score at the end of the game, at the halftime and for each quarter.

=== Japan ===
Sports Promotion Lottery (スポーツ振興くじ, Supōtsu Shinkō-kuji) is a sports lottery run by the Japan Sports Council, a special corporation under the jurisdiction of the Ministry of Education, Culture, Sports, Science and Technology. It was established in the spring of 2000 under the Sports Betting Law and was launched in 2001. It was initially aimed at J-League with Soccer-kuji (サッカーくじ) or Toto. Soccer-kuji was divided into two types: Toto, where the participants predict the result of the game, and TotoGOAL, where the participants predict the goals scored. In the fall of 2022, a prediction-based lottery was established aimed at B.League.

== See also ==
- Arbitrage betting
- Tote betting
- Fixed-odds betting
- Financial betting
- Sports betting
- Sports betting systems
