= Rohan J. Smith =

Australian rules footballer (born 1966)

Rohan Smith

Personal information
- Full name: Rohan J. Smith
- Born: 28 June 1966 (age 60)
- Original team: Port Adelaide (SANFL)
- Draft: No. 36, 1989 National Draft (Sydney)
- Height: 178 cm (5 ft 10 in)
- Weight: 76 kg (168 lb)

Playing career
Years	Club	Games (Goals)
1985-1990, 1992-1997	Port Adelaide (SANFL)	251 (247)
1991	St Kilda	3 (0)

Career highlights
- 6x Port Adelaide premiership player (1988, 1989, 1992, 1994, 1995, 1996)

Rohan J. Smith (born 28 June 1966) is a former Australian rules footballer who played with St Kilda in the Australian Football League (AFL) and the Port Adelaide Football Club in the South Australian National Football League (SANFL).

== Port Adelaide (1985–1990) ==
Smith worked his way through the Port Adelaide's junior until he made seven senior appearances during the 1985 season. In 1986 Smith became a regular, first choice selection for Port Adelaide.

During the 1989 National Draft, Smith was selected by the Sydney Swans, from Port Adelaide, where he had been a member of premiership teams the years prior. The Swans selected him with pick 36. However he wouldn't play a senior game for the club.

== St Kilda (1991) ==
The following year he was traded from Sydney to St Kilda, in return for pick 58 in the 1990 AFL draft. He was already 24 when he made his debut and appeared in a total of three games for St Kilda, in the 1991 season. His year with St Kilda was dogged by injury and returning to Adelaide he missed the 1990 SANFL Grand Final.

== Port Adelaide (1992–1997) ==
After his stint with St Kilda, Smith returned to his original club and took part in a further four Port Adelaide premierships, in 1992, 1994, 1995 and 1996. He finished his Port Adelaide career with exactly 250 SANFL games.
