= Scott Bassett =

Australian rules footballer (born 1978)

Personal information
- Born: 9 October 1978 (age 48)
- Original team: Norwood (SANFL)
- Debut: Round 14, 2 July 1999, Port Adelaide vs. Collingwood, at the M.C.G

Playing career^{1}
Years	Club	Games (Goals)
1999–2002	Port Adelaide	15 (2)
2003–2004	Western Bulldogs	15 (1)
Total		30 (3)
- ^{1} Playing statistics correct to the end of 2004.

Scott Bassett (born 9 October 1978) is a retired Australian rules footballer who played for the Port Adelaide Football Club and the Western Bulldogs in the Australian Football League, and Norwood in the South Australian National Football League.

Scott was one of the inaugural members of Port Adelaide's squad when they entered the AFL, as the team was allowed to select players from the SANFL for their starting team. He was drafted from the Norwood Football Club. He was drafted onto the rookie list for the club. He however did not play a match in the first two seasons on the Port Adelaide list, making his debut against Collingwood in Round 14, 1999, but did not play again in that year. At the end of the year, he was elevated off the rookie list, on to Port Adelaide's senior list. In the next 3 years on the Port Adelaide list, he played just the 14 games, spending much time in and out of the side.

He was delisted at the end of the 2002 AFL season, and nominated for the national AFL draft, and was picked up by the Western Bulldogs at pick number 35 overall. He started the first seven games of the season in 2003, but was sidelined by a thigh injury, and later in the year returned to the VFL. He played a total of 15 games for the Bulldogs before returning to play for Norwood in the SANFL. He finished his AFL career playing a total of 30 games and scoring 3 goals.

He continued playing for Norwood in the SANFL. He is now the senior assistant coach for the Norwood Football Club.
