= Scott Lee (footballer) =

Australian rules footballer

Personal information
- Full name: Scott Lee
- Born: 5 June 1963 (age 63)
- Original team: Yallourn / Hawthorn
- Height: 178 cm (5 ft 10 in)
- Weight: 86 kg (190 lb)
- Position: Defender

Playing career^{1}
Years	Club	Games (Goals)
1985–2000	Central District	243 (107)
1991–1995	Adelaide	86 (18)
- ^{1} Playing statistics correct to the end of 2000.

Scott Lee (born 5 June 1963) is a former professional Australian rules footballer who played for the Adelaide Football Club in the Australian Football League (AFL) and Central District Football Club in the South Australian National Football League (SANFL).

Lee, originally from Yallourn, started out at Hawthorn in the 1980s but couldn't find his way into the firsts and had just one night premiership game to show for his time at the club. He got a clearance to Central District in 1985 and gave them good service as a defender, winning 'Best and Fairests' in 1987 and 1990, before getting his second chance at playing AFL when Adelaide recruited him for their inaugural season.

His AFL career began well, with 29 disposals in Adelaide's win over eventual premiers Hawthorn in the opening round and he missed no games all season, equal best with Grantley Fielke and Rodney Maynard. The following year he received four Brownlow Medal votes, the first two for nine marks and 33 disposals in a win over Richmond at the MCG and the other for his efforts in a victory against St Kilda at home. Lee, a nuggety back pocket, took part in the club's first ever finals series in 1993, including their loss in the Preliminary Final to Essendon.

In 1996, despite his career at Adelaide being finished, Lee continued playing with Central District and appeared in their Grand Final loss that year. He retired in 2000, having played 243 SANFL games for Central District. A five-time South Australian interstate representative, Lee is a back pocket in the Bulldog's 'Best All Time Team 1964 to 2003'.
