= Banner (Australian rules football) =

Message shown by Australian rules football cheer squads

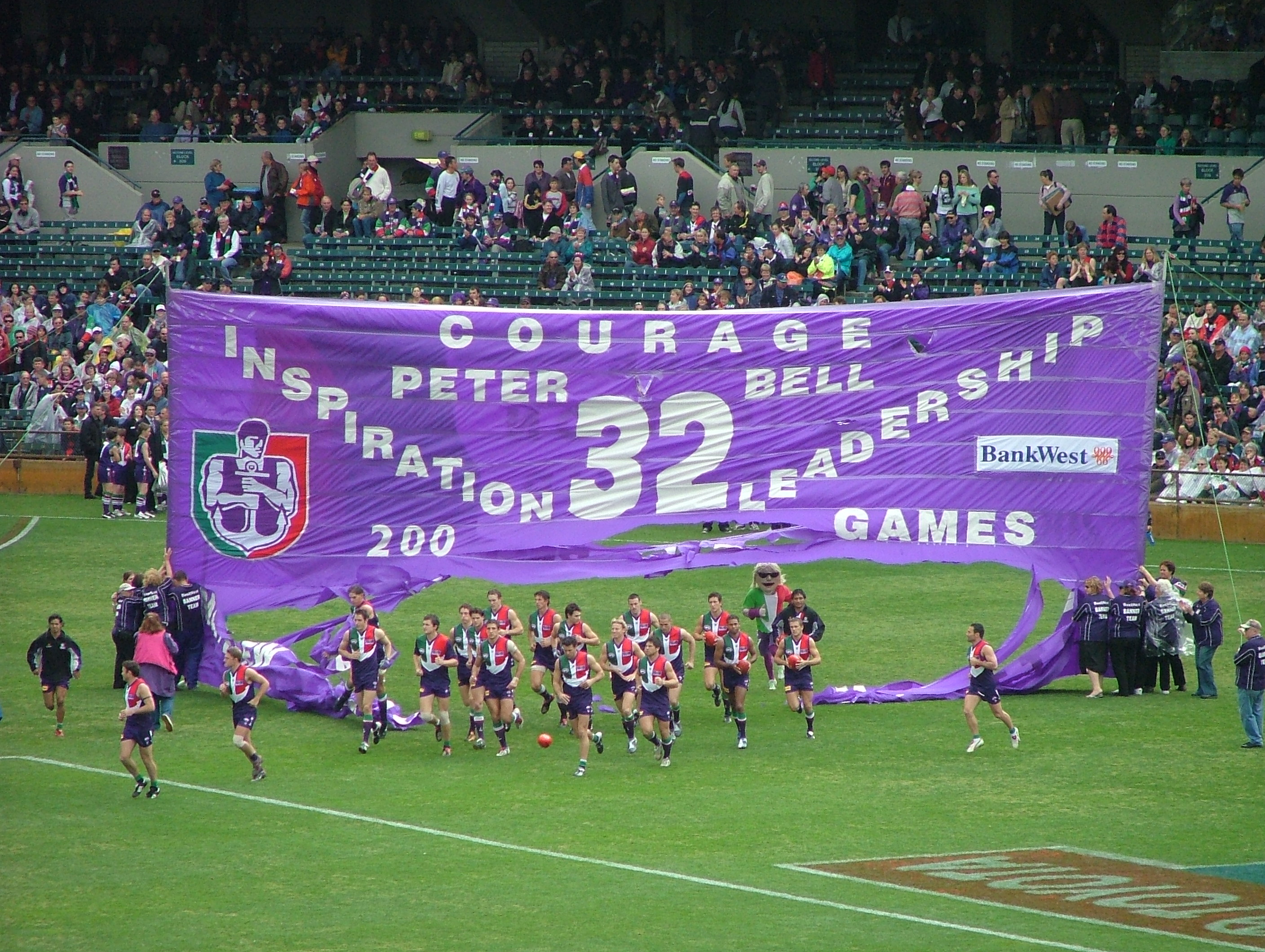
Fremantle players enter Subiaco Oval, by running through a celebratory banner before a game in 2004

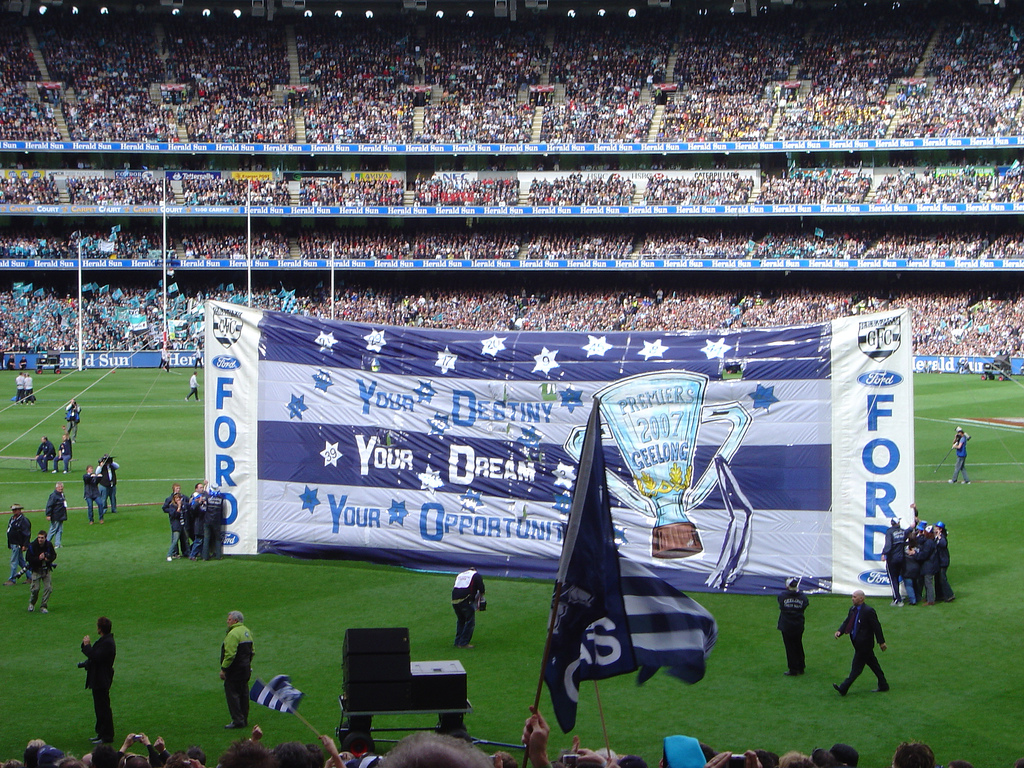
A Geelong Football Club banner, hoisted up.

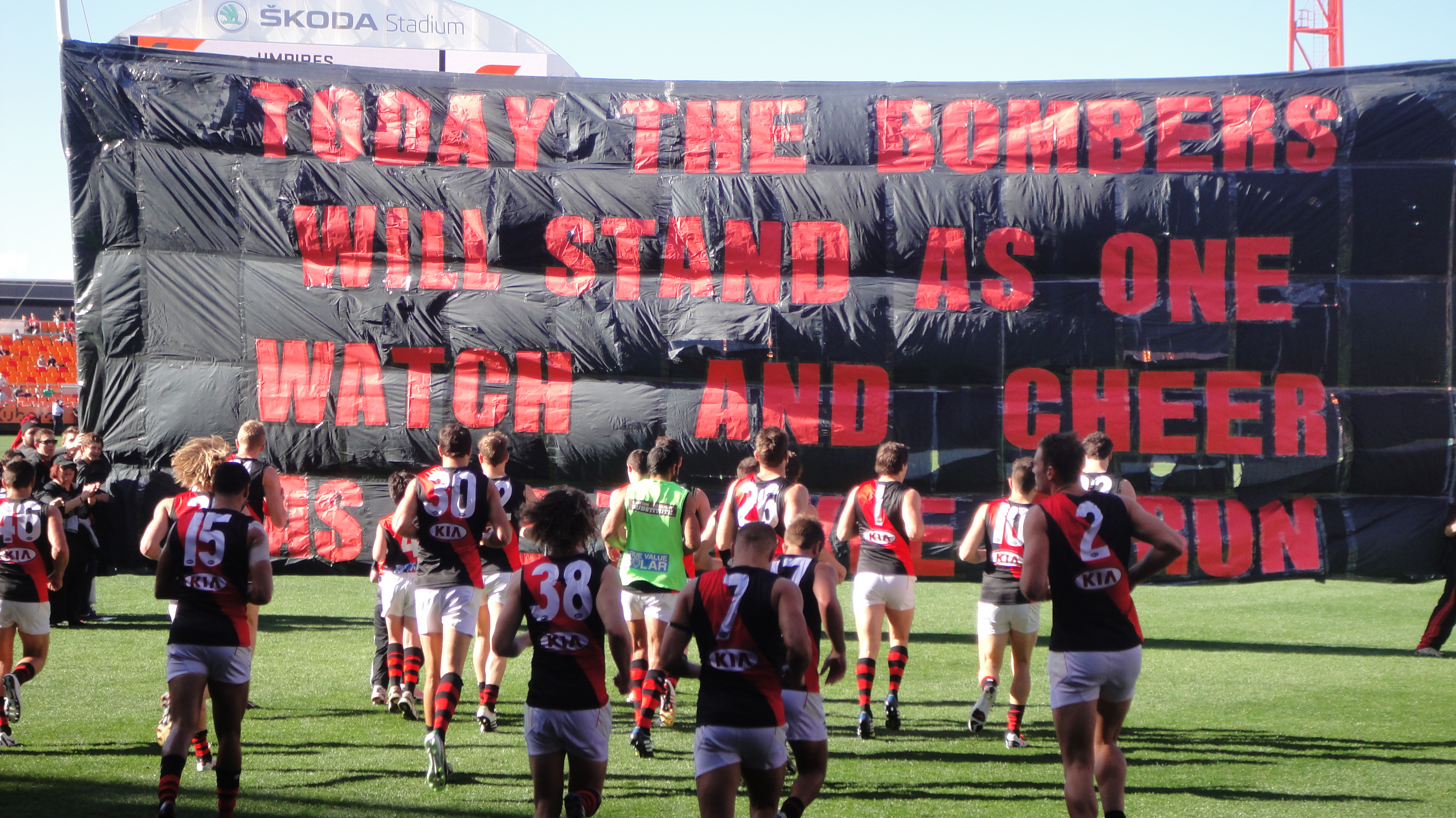
Essendon players running through a banner prior to a match against Greater Western Sydney in 2013.

In Australian rules football, a banner is a large crêpe paper and sticky-tape banner constructed by each team's cheer squad. It is hoisted before the start of a match, and typically shows an encouraging or celebratory message to the team; then, as the players take to the field, they run through the banner, breaking it. Traditionally, the captain, or a milestone-achieving player leads the team when breaking the banner.

Tracing its origins to the 1930s, the concept of the Australian rules football banner is unique in world sport, and has become standard at all AFL matches.

== Construction ==
Banners are made from crêpe paper and sticky tape, and are attached to two long poles which are used to hold the banner up for the players to run through. Banners are generally at least 8–10 m long, and over 3.5 m or 4 m high – crêpe paper is not strong, and so a lot of sticky tape is used to keep the banner together, particularly at the poles. There are two general ways that the banners are taped together: taping parallel lines every six inches along the length of the banner for its entire height, or; taping in both directions to produce 1 ft square panels. With extra tape on the edges and at the pole, this makes the banner a fairly sturdy construction which the players have no trouble breaking through.

Thicker tape is used at the top of the banner, and thinner tape at the bottom. This enables players to run through the banner and not get caught in the tape. 4 inch thick tape is the thickest tape most cheersquads use, and 1 inch is the smallest.

Some cheer squads, such as that of Carlton, have a permanent upper half made from cloth, and tape crêpe paper only across the lower half through which players run. Each week, they will reuse the top half by taping new letters to it.

In 2014, some teams created full fabric curtains rather than use crepe paper. A small split in the lower centre area allowed the players to pass through it. The fabric could be reused each week, saving money and time. However, this limits the design options.

Most banners have one base colour, which in the past was almost always the team's main colour, and writing in the team's secondary colour or colours; for example, Essendon, who wear black with a red sash, would have a black banner with red writing. However, these days it is not uncommon for teams to invert the colours.

== History ==
Older terminology for what is currently known as a banner is "the race", named after the caged wire tunnel separating players from patrons that the players traverse to enter the playing arena. This tunnel is known as "the race" or "the players' race". Supporters would "decorate the race", hence the name. A "race" first appeared at the 1939 VFL Grand Final, with Collingwood running on to the ground through a loose tapestry of woven streamers attached to the players race. This system evolved with the loose tapestry changing to a tightly knitted tapestry.

Essendon's VFL Grand Final races of 1947 & 1949 show the difference: the former is a looser tapestry, the latter tightly woven. Decorating the race continued until 1962: some clubs mounted a sign with the club emblem above the race, adding to the size and beauty of the creation.

Similar to the race decoration, many supporters wove steamers through fence pickets near their seats to demonstrate their support for their team. These decorations evolved to small fabric signs hung on the fence, and later again, they evolved to larger fabric fence-mounted banners.

In 1960, one of the first banners affixed to the MCG Southern Stand simply read, "Collingwood Forever". In 1961, a "Magpies" banner was affixed to the fence directly between the goal posts at an MCG finals game when Carlton Football Club player John James was presented with his Brownlow Medal.

One of the first of the longer banners to traverse quite some length of the fence was at the 1962 VFL Grand Final. It read, "Come on Carlton – The Mighty Blues", behind which sat the Carlton Cheer Squad. Cheer Squads, typically, made these longer banners; and, during 1963, most clubs’ cheer squads had created lengthy banners for mounting to the fence for their club's games. Sometimes, during VFL finals, banners of a non-competing team may appear, often because the club may have had a reserves team competing in an earlier game on the day. An example of this is a prominently mounted Collingwood banner during the 1966 Essendon v St Kilda VFL Preliminary Final.

With the introduction of fence-mounted advertising hoarding, there was no room available for cheer squad banners. One of the last VFL games to have banners was the 1982 Grand Final with a long Richmond banner mounted on the MCG Southern and Ponsford Stands.

By 1984 and 1985 grand finals, advertising filled the fence, and although space remained available at grandstand level, only a few banners were erected. In the little space available on the Ponsford Stand, there were no banners erected at the 1986 Grand Final.

At the raising of Collingwood's 2010 premiership flag in 2011, a re-creation of the banner that read "Collingwood Domination Envy of the Nation" was mounted on the Great Southern Stand. Cheer squads also evolved the size of "floggers"—crepe streamers attached to sticks in club colours and waved in support of their team, which were banned in 1978.

In 1963, poles were added to the "race" to enable it to be portable, and the woven crepe paper construction was moved from the end of the players race onto the arena playing surface. The transition is best shown at the 1963 Grand Final, where Hawthorn's race was the older style mounted to the end of the players' race, whilst Geelong's race was the newer portable style. Typically, cheer squad members held the poles.

With poles being used, the creation of the race was no longer limited to the size of the players race, and they became incrementally larger throughout the late 1960s. Words and messages first appeared on the race sometime between 1966 and 1970.

Up until the early 1970s a race was not created for every game. Because they were cumbersome and tedious to construct, they were reserved only for special occasions, such as finals games and player milestones. As cheer squad's funded the costs themselves, not all cheer squads could afford a race each week.

A terminology change occurred in the mid 1970s. "The race" became a "run-through". There was no specific reason for the change of name, other than a generational change of cheer squad members. However, media reports from the 1960s and early 1970s had often used the name "banner", a precursor of what was to come.

During the 1970s run-throughs became wider and taller. Due to the increased size of run-throughs in the early 1980s, ropes began being used for additional support. Each week, the cheer squad would gather, and construct from crepe paper and adhesive tape, a run-through with an inspirational message, or a message derogatory of the other team, on each side. With fence mounted banners rarely in use, the terminology for a run-through became "banner". Banners were now several metres tall, and the few supporters holding the poles from the base were replaced with three supporters holding tethers from the top of the pole and five or six at the base, for each pole. It is generally raised 20 or 30 metres away from the fence.

Traditionally, the captain would lead the team through the run-through, with his teammates trailing behind. During the 1980s teams began to gather their players in front of the banner before breaking through it together in a display of togetherness and teamwork.

Advertising first appeared on run-throughs in the late 1970s. Costs increased commensurate with the size of the run-through, creating a need for additional funding. Early advertising was in club colours and often incorporated into the run-through's message. After 2000, approximately, advertising logos often appeared in their own colour. If different from the club colours, this detracts from the visual effect of the banner. Inspirational, or anti-opposition, messages were replaced by advertising slogans, creating an insipid feel to the banner.

In 2014, Collingwood Football Club banned the cheer squad from creating or holding the team's banner. The club now arranges this themselves. They have replaced the traditional crepe banner with a fabric curtain. It remains to be seen if terminology will change again. The curtain method is also used by other clubs.

== Uses ==
There are five main functions that a banner can take. As it is a double-sided construction, which the cheer squad usually hoists in all four directions to allow all fans to read each side, most of these are seen each week.

- Inspirational messages: these are generally found in the form of a four-line rhyming message. They can be fairly predictable, and usually will the team on to beat the opposition and continue up the ladder.
- Demotivational messages: when an opponent, particularly a hated one, is coming off a bad loss or is having a bad year, it is common for cheer squads to use the banner to annoy the opposition fans. This is particularly prevalent amongst more heated rivalries, such as Carlton and Collingwood, or Adelaide and Port Adelaide.
- Celebration of milestones: when a player is playing a milestone game - his 50th, 100th, 150th etc. AFL game or club game, or a record-breaking game, it is standard practice to reward that effort by emblazoning his name and often a picture of him on the banner. In these circumstances, it is accepted that the milestone player will lead the team through the banner instead of the captain, unless the player is the captain.
- Advertising club events: one side of a banner will often be used to advertise an upcoming family day, best and fairest night, or to spruik for memberships at the beginning of a season.
- Advertising sponsors: while not historically a feature, it is now accepted that club sponsors will pay the cheer squad to have their logo on the banner. Usually, the sponsors name will feature on plastic sheathes into which the poles are slotted, and the banner is attached between the two.

== Banners outside the AFL ==
It is common for junior clubs to prepare small banners when one of their players is playing a milestone game. This arises from the fact that banners are much loved by children when they go to the football, and clubs like to oblige their desires. Junior milestone banners are generally no bigger than 2×3 m, and the team usually lines up to form a guard of honour for the player before he bursts through his own banner.

In 1983, The Balranald Roos Football Club had a Grand Final banner measuring 7 metres high x 23 metres wide. On one side it read, "History in the Making". On the reverse side, "Bring It On Home". It was created by Richmond Cheer Squad, in recognition of retired VFL player Jim Jess, who was then playing for Balranald.

The Melbourne Storm come through a banner when they take to the field at their home ground, AAMI Park and at their old ground, Olympic Park. Banners have never been a part of the NRL, but cheer squads from Melbourne were keen to bring the AFL practice into their adopted sport, as Victoria, in particular Melbourne, is Australian Rules Football heartland.

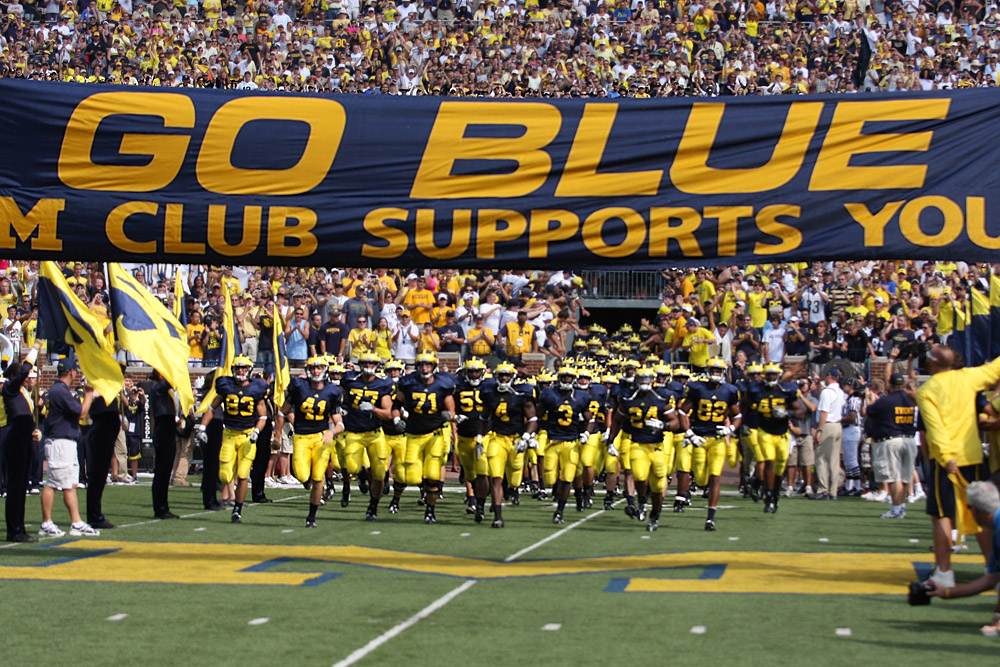
The Michigan Wolverines during their entrance in a 2009 game.

In American College football, banners are used by some teams such as Michigan. However, generally these banners are shorter and held aloft for players to jump and touch, as opposed to running through.

== Banner incidents, customs and superstitions ==
As crepe paper and sticky tape is not renowned for its strength, banners will often rip in places, or even be completely de-poled if the weather is very windy or wet. Seeing an opponent's banner de-poled is always a source of amusement for fans, leaving their opponent open to ridicule.

In 1971, St Kilda's Cheer Squad mocked their poorly performing opposition in a match against South Melbourne when the St Kilda run-through read "South Melbourne the Invincible Masters and Supreme Conquerors of..." and on the reverse side, "the wooden spoon". In response to this, the St Kilda captain, Ross Smith, and several St Kilda players ran around the run-through, not through it.

In 1972, an Essendon supporter ran through the Collingwood run-through at Victoria Park before being detained by security: Collingwood fans invaded the ground and demolished the Essendon run-through in retaliation for the incident.

In 1975, Collingwood supported Hawthorn captain Peter Crimmins in his fight against cancer, with the simple message, "Collingwood supports Crimmins". Later that year, Collingwood derided former player, and then Essendon captain-coach, Des Tuddenham with a banner that read, "Sgt Tuddy's Lonely Tarts Club Band", a play on a Beatles song title.

In 1980, Collingwood ridiculed Carlton's new coach, Peter "Percy" Jones, with a banner that read "Percy Jones - The Mind That Launched Larundel", a reference to an asylum in the nearby suburb of Bundoora.

In protest at their club's imminent relocation to Sydney, South Melbourne Cheer Squad made an all black 'mourning' banner in 1981. Their captain and several players ran around the banner, as it was not in South Melbourne's red and white team colours and did not realise it was theirs to run through. Another South Melbourne banner that year read "South Melbourne - you sold your soul."

Multiple premiership player and coach Ron Barassi returned to coach Melbourne in 1981. Coming into the last round, the Demons were 1-20, one game behind Footscray but with a superior percentage: if they won and the Bulldogs lost, they would avoid the wooden spoon at the Bulldogs' expense, otherwise Barassi, for his first time in his career, would be involved with a 'wooden spooner'. At the beginning of the last game of the season against Hawthorn, the Hawthorn cheer squad poked fun at this situation, with the Hawthorn run-through reading "Congratulations on your first spoon, Ron", which was greeted with laughter by Barassi. Hawthorn won the match by 53 points, meaning that Melbourne won the wooden spoon.

For Kevin Bartlett's 400th game in 1983, the Richmond cheer squad created a banner 10 metres high by 20 metres wide.

Carlton's Cheer Squad were denied permission to use a social club room to make one of their banners in 1984. In protest, on game day they held up two poles with no banner. During a dispute with their club in 1985, Collingwood Cheer Squad refused to make a banner for a game against St Kilda.

In 1986, the St Kilda cheer squad reacted to media rumours that their struggling club was going to be relocated to Brisbane with a banner that read: "St Kilda is here to stay and that's the final say." A year later, after the Brisbane Bears and West Coast had been admitted, the Saints ran through another banner that read "VFL not NFL".

As talks of a merger between Footscray and Fitzroy emerged in 1989, Ron Barassi suggested that Footscray was suffering because the suburb had changed due to drugs and a growing Asian population. In response to this, the cheer squad banner retorted: "Barassi we love our Western Oval + our ethnic + Asian community. Leave us alone."

In Round 16, 1996, the Fitzroy cheer squad protested the club's imminent takeover by Brisbane (after a similar offer by North Melbourne had collapsed) by revealing a banner that read "Seduced by North, Raped By Brisbane, F*****d by the AFL".

In Round 1, 2005, Melbourne and Essendon paid tribute to Melbourne's Troy Broadbridge, who was killed in the Boxing Day tsunami with a special banner precession. The two cheer squads set their banners up side-by-side in the centre of the wing, and the teams observed a minute silence before breaking through their banners at the same time.

The joint banner tribute was repeated in 2013 when Collingwood and Port Adelaide ran through a single banner to remember John McCarthy, a former player of both teams who had died the previous October.

In each of the games played in the round following the death of Adelaide Football Club coach Phillip Walsh in July 2015, no banners were used and the club songs weren't played. When Adelaide played Port Adelaide in Showdown XXXIX the following week, the two teams both ran through a single large black banner without any advertising logos, with one of Walsh's favourite sayings "Get the job done" written on one side and "Vale Phil Walsh" on the other. Walsh had been an assistant coach at Port Adelaide prior to becoming the head coach at Adelaide.

Some players have superstitions or routines regarding the banner. One such superstition is that some players like to be the first one through the banner. Even though it is customary for the captain (or milestone player) to lead the team through the banner, it is often the case that the superstitious player walks up to the banner alongside his leading captain, and then reaches out to touch the paper first.

Other players, notably Matthew Richardson and Brendan Fevola, avoid touching the banner altogether. While they will run through it, they would usually trail the pack and try to avoid any hanging paper. Richardson's superstition led to a special banner being made for his 150th game—it had a very large opening in the centre base to allow Richardson to lead his team straight through it. Other routines include always kicking a football at the banner before running through it, or simply running around it or under it instead of through it.
