= Fabian Francis =

Personal information
- Full name: Fabian Francis
- Born: 24 October 1973 (age 53); Darwin, Northern Territory, Australia
- Original team: Southern Districts (NTFL)
- Height: 177 cm (5 ft 10 in)
- Weight: 87 kg (192 lb)

Playing career^{1}
Years	Club	Games (Goals)
1991–1992	Melbourne	1 (0)
1993–1994	Brisbane Bears	22 (17)
1995–1997	Port Adelaide (SANFL)	33 (32)
1997–2001	Port Adelaide	86 (44)
2002	South Fremantle (WAFL)	3 (2)
Total		145 (95)

Representative team honours
Years	Team	Games (Goals)
1994	Indigenous All-Stars	1
- ^{1} Playing statistics correct to the end of 2002.

Fabian Francis (born 24 October 1973) is a former Australian rules footballer who played for Port Adelaide in the Australian Football League.

== Early life ==
Born in Darwin into a family of Torres Strait Islander descent, Francis grew up playing both rugby league and Australian rules football.

Francis played in the Litchfield Rugby League Club's premiership team in 1992. He chose to focus on Australian rules football and began playing Australian rules football for the Southern Districts club in the Northern Territory Football League.

Francis moved to Adelaide in 1992 to play for Port Adelaide in the South Australian National Football League. Although he did not play a senior game for Port, Francis sufficiently impressed Australian Football League (AFL) club Melbourne to draft him.

== AFL career ==
Francis made his AFL debut with Melbourne in 1991, but he did not enjoy living in Melbourne and after one season returned to Darwin to play rugby league.

Brisbane coach Robert Walls convinced Francis to return to Australian rules with the Brisbane Bears and Francis played for Brisbane from 1994 to 1995. He spent the off-season playing rugby league in Darwin where he was part of the Northern Territory side in the 1995 Ansett Challenge Cup that defeated the Mascot Jets and Victoria. He returned to Port Adelaide for the 1996 season, where he played in Port's premiership winning 1996 SANFL Grand Final side and was runner-up in the Magarey Medal. He was then named as an inaugural member of Port Adelaide's AFL team in 1997. Francis was clearly a favourite with Port Adelaide fans, winning the Member's Choice award for favourite player in both 1999 and 2000.

Following a pay dispute, Francis was delisted by Port Adelaide at the end of the 2001 AFL season. Soon after being appointed coach of the Fremantle Dockers for the 2002 season, Chris Connolly suggested that Francis could be drafted by the Dockers with their number one selection at the upcoming preseason draft. A deal was soon struck between Fremantle and Francis, that he would be drafted, and he moved from Adelaide to Perth, with his family, and began training with the Dockers. Shortly before the preseason draft, the AFL informed Fremantle that they had exceeded Total Player Payments (TPP) for season 2001 - despite finishing last with only two wins for the year, and they would be barred from the upcoming draft, preventing them from selecting Francis. It is understood that the breach of TPP occurred due to an excess of injury payments - several regular players had been injured and a greater than expected number of players on match payments had needed to be paid.

Fremantle then struck a deal with a clearly upset and disillusioned Francis, that he play the 2002 season in the WAFL for South Fremantle, and then be guaranteed to be drafted by Fremantle in the 2002 AFL draft.

During the 2002 season, Francis suffered a serious knee injury playing for South Fremantle, and never played senior football again. He was not drafted by Fremantle later in the year, and a cash settlement was agreed upon in lieu of drafting him. He did stay with the club however, becoming a runner.

== Post-AFL ==
Since his AFL career, Francis has worked with unemployed Indigenous Australians in finding jobs in Darwin and Alice Springs. He also fathered 3 children.

== Personal life ==
Prior to 1999 Francis was in a relationship with Dawn Cleary, together they had a daughter, Kloe Cleary. From 1999 to 2007 he was married to Debra Buckskin, a police officer. In September 2009 he appeared in a South Australian court charged with offences related to domestic violence. Later in 2009, he was officially charged with the following crimes: three charges of threatening life, eight counts of common assault, six counts of aggravated assault, six counts of assault occasioning actual bodily harm, and two counts of threatening to cause harm. Fabian pleaded not guilty to all charges; however, it was announced on 26 January 2012 that Francis was found guilty and was subsequently sentenced to 15 months in jail over the charges. The judge described Francis as "domineering, threatening, verbally vicious and at times physically quite violent ... undeterred by the presence of others - by the presence of [their] children, her parents or by work colleagues", noting "Francis had bashed Ms Buckskin in the face, threatened to stab her and threatened to injure her to such an extent that she would have to drink through a straw."

He later married Trish Gully and had another child with her. In 2021, Francis' step-son Jason Horne-Francis, Gully's son from a previous marriage, was chosen as the number one pick in the 2021 AFL draft.

== See also ==
- 1996 SANFL Grand Final
