= List of Australian television ratings for 2002 =

Following an upward trajectory in the past five years; The Seven Network was tipped to have the highest network share in 2002, following a highly publicized corporate shuffle at the Nine Network, which saw its CEO, David Leckie replaced after the network lost 11 out of 40 rating weeks to Channel 7 in the previous year. Under new management, the Nine Network made considerable tweaks to its programming schedule, most notably discontinuing the game show, Sale of the Century after nearly two decades on air.

However, despite the early media buzz, Channel Seven's reining success did not eventuate and the network struggled without the 2002 AFL season (which was now broadcast by the Nine Network), whilst audience numbers for their other offerings dipping significantly. Moreover, The Weakest Link, a ratings hit in 2001, disappeared mysteriously from Seven's schedule by late April. Seven's ‘5-City’ share plummeted to new lows and after just six weeks into the official ratings season they found themselves in third place behind Nine and Channel Ten. Seven's share would recover in the latter half of the year but came nowhere near rivaling Nine for top spot.

Consequently, 2002 was easily Channel Nine's year; losing only three out of the 40 official ratings weeks, with Seven winning the three weeks with Winter Olympics & Commonwealth Games coverage. The network dominated the most watched broadcast lists; with Nine News and A Current Affair consistently beating competition from main rival, Seven. However 2002 also marked the beginning of the rise of the Ten Network which had some significant programming success in this year. Ten scored another news coup; after being the first TV network to begin rolling reportage of the 11 September attacks in 2001 – 2002 saw them with the most watched news bulletin for the year with its ‘First at Five’ service reporting on the Bali Bombings of 13 October.

A notable event occurred on 11 March 2002 where Nine's Who Wants to Be a Millionaire? outrated Seven's The Weakest Link: The Mole Special, with 1.51 million viewers compared to 1.312 million. The latter episode saw a record low of $14,100 won, which was rounded up to $15,000 on The Mole. That show never returned to its dominance in 2000 when the show first appeared on Seven, causing the following season to be moved to a later time in 2003.

The following is a list of Australian television ratings for the year 2002.

== Most Watched Broadcasts in 2002 ==
Rank	Broadcast	Genre	Origin	Date	Network	Audience
1	Test Australia: The National IQ Test	Game Show	(Australia)	6 August 2002	9	2,779,000
2	2002 FIFA World Cup (Soccer) Final	Sport	(Japan)	30 June 2002	9	2,702,000
3	2002 AFL Grand Final	Sport	(Australia)	28 September 2002	10	2,626,000
4	2002 Melbourne Cup	Sport	(Australia)	5 November 2002	7	2,503,000
5	Friends	Sitcom	(United States)	11 February 2002	9	2,410,000
6	Ten News (Sunday)	News	(Australia)	13 October 2002	10	2,400,000
7	Big Brother 2002 (Final Eviction)	Reality	(Australia)	1 July 2002	10	2,301,000
8	Friends	Sitcom	(United States)	25 February 2002	9	2,279,000
9	National Nine News (Sunday)	News	(Australia)	30 June 2002	9	2,260,000
10	National Nine News (Sunday)	News	(Australia)	26 May 2002	9	2,207,000
11	National Nine News (Sunday)	News	(Australia)	28 April 2002	9	2,197,000
12	2002 NRL Grand Final	Sport	(Australia)	6 October 2002	9	2,177,000
13	National Nine News (Sunday)	News	(Australia)	27 January 2002	9	2,175,000
14	Friends	Sitcom	(United States)	18 February 2002	9	2,173,000
15	National Nine News (Sunday)	News	(Australia)	28 July 2002	9	2,168,000
16	2002 Commonwealth Games (Day 5)	Sport	(United Kingdom)	30 July 2002	7	2,156,000
17	60 Minutes (Dr Kerryn Phelps and Jackie Stricker)	News	(Australia)	13 October 2002	9	2,154,000
18	Friends	Sitcom	(United States)	4 March 2002	9	2,151,000
19	National Nine News (Sunday)	News	(Australia)	14 July 2002	9	2,145,000
20	National Nine News (Sunday)	News	(Australia)	18 August 2002	9	2,137,000

== See also ==
- Television ratings in Australia
