= Stephen Schwerdt =

Australian rules footballer

Personal information
- Full name: Stephen Schwerdt
- Born: 28 May 1968 (age 58)
- Original team: Central District
- Draft: 78th, 1989 VFL draft West Coast Eagles
- Height: 183 cm (6 ft 0 in)
- Weight: 81 kg (179 lb)

Playing career^{1}
Years	Club	Games (Goals)
1992–1994	Adelaide	25 (4)
- ^{1} Playing statistics correct to the end of 1994.

Stephen Schwerdt (born 28 May 1968) is a former Australian rules footballer who played with Adelaide in the Australian Football League (AFL).

Schwerdt was initially drafted by the West Coast Eagles but didn't make the move to Western Australia and remained at Central District for their 1990 season.

The following year however he joined Adelaide's list but didn't play an AFL game in 1991 after twice breaking his jaw. He finally got his chance in 1992 when he made 13 appearances and averaged 21 disposals a game. A wingman and half back flanker, Schwerdt played just 12 more games over the next two seasons.

He appeared in two SANFL grand finals with Central District, in 1995 and 1996, but finished on the losing team in each. In 1998, despite being near the end of his career, he had a good enough season to win Central District's "Best and Fairest" award. He had accumulated 212 SANFL games by the time he retired, just missing out on the club's drought breaking premiership in 2000.

Since his retirement, Schwerdt serving as the Physical Performance Manager at Adelaide before moving to Gold Coast Suns at the end of 2015 as the high performance manager.
