= David Brown (footballer, born 1969) =

Australian rules footballer, born 1969

Personal information
- Full name: David Brown
- Born: 29 September 1969 (age 57)
- Original team: Port Adelaide (SANFL)
- Height: 172 cm (5 ft 8 in)
- Weight: 75 kg (165 lb)

Playing career^{1}
Years	Club	Games (Goals)
1987–1996, 1998-2001	Port Adelaide (SANFL)	182 (156)
1991–1996	Adelaide	69 (55)
1997–1998	Port Adelaide (AFL)	22 (18)
Total		273 (229)
- ^{1} Playing statistics correct to the end of 1998.

Career highlights
- 6x Port Adelaide premiership player (SANFL) 1988, 1989, 1992, 1996, 1998, 1999; Jack Oatey Medal 1996; Inaugural Port Adelaide AFL player

David Brown (born 29 September 1969) is a former professional Australian rules footballer who played for the Adelaide Football Club and Port Adelaide Football Club in the Australian Football League (AFL).

Originally from Port Adelaide, Brown was chosen as one of the Adelaide Crows initial recruits for the Crows' first season in the AFL in 1991. After 69 games in six seasons with Adelaide, Brown was recruited by Port Adelaide to be part of its own inaugural AFL squad in 1997. Brown played two seasons with Port's AFL team, playing 22 matches before being named captain of the Port Adelaide Magpies in 1999.

Brown was a member of Port Adelaide premierships on six occasions; 1988, 1989, 1992, 1996, 1998, 1999, and won the Jack Oatey Medal for best player in the grand final in 1996. He retired in 2001, having played 182 games in the SANFL and kicked 156 goals.

Brown holds the unique honour of being an inaugural player for both Adelaide (in 1991) and Port Adelaide (in 1997) in their first seasons in the AFL.
