= Darren Smith (Australian rules footballer) =

Australian rules footballer

Personal information
- Full name: Darren Smith
- Born: 9 February 1965 (age 61); Rudall, South Australia
- Original team: Rudall (CJFL)
- Height: 193 cm (6 ft 4 in)
- Weight: 90 kg (198 lb)
- Position: Centre half forward

Playing career^{1}
Years	Club	Games (Goals)
1984–1998	Port Adelaide	343 (456)
1991–1992	Adelaide	9 (10)
Total		352 (466)
- ^{1} Playing statistics correct to the end of 1996.

Career highlights
- South Australian Football Hall of Fame Inductee 2018

Darren Smith (born 9 February 1965) is a former Australian rules footballer who played for the Port Adelaide Football Club in the South Australian National Football League (SANFL) and Adelaide Football Club in the Australian Football League (AFL).

== Port Adelaide (1984–1990) ==
Smith grew up in the Eyre Peninsula, playing for Rudall Football Club in the County Jervois Football League (CJFL). After playing under-age football for Port Adelaide, he broke into the Port Adelaide seniors in 1984. He topped Port's goal-kicking in 1986 and 1987, with 49 and 71 goals respectively, ending the sequence of nine leading goal-kicker awards from Tim Evans. Essendon acquired the centre half forward's services when they picked him up with pick 11 in the 1989 VFL Draft but the move didn't work out and he resumed at Port Adelaide.

== Adelaide Crows (1991–1992) ==
When Adelaide entered the AFL in 1991, Smith was one of their local recruits and he performed well in their inaugural with two goals and ten marks against Hawthorn. Two rounds later he played his best game for Adelaide when he had 24 disposals and kicked four goals and five behinds in a win over Sydney at the SCG, with his fellow Port Adelaide key forward Scott Hodges bagging six of his own.

He soon lost his place in the team and spent most of the remainder of the season playing for Port Adelaide in the SANFL.

== Port Adelaide (1993–1998) ==
After being delisted by the Adelaide Crows, Darren Smith resumed playing for Port Adelaide on a full-time basis. He retired in 1998. Smith had appeared in seven premiership teams with Port Adelaide, 1988, 1989, 1990, 1992, 1994, 1995 and 1996. Smith is widely regarded as one of the best team men to play for the Port Adelaide Football Club.

== Personal life ==
Smith's niece, Bella Smith, played junior football for Port Adelaide and has played professionally since 2021, when she was drafted by AFL Women's (AFLW) club Collingwood.

== Honours ==
Darren Smith is only one of six players, the others being Russell Ebert, Greg Phillips, Tim Ginever, Kane Cornes and Travis Boak, to have played 300 games for the Port Adelaide Football Club.
