= 1995 SANFL season =

1995 season of SANFL

- Teams: 9
- Premiers: Port Adelaide; 33rd premiership
- Minor premiers: Central District; 2nd minor premiership
- Magarey Medallist: Glenn Kilpatrick; West Adelaide (17 votes); Garry McIntosh; Norwood (17 votes)
- Ken Farmer Medallist: Danny Del-Re; South Adelaide (92 goals)
- Matches played: 105
- Highest: 45,786 (Grand Final, Port Adelaide vs. Central District)

The 1995 SANFL season was the 116th season of the highest level Australian rules football competition in South Australia. It was dominated by discussion of and planning around the proposed second South Australian AFL team, expected to be premier SANFL team Port Adelaide but encompassing bids via mergers from other clubs. The Magpies, despite the distraction of an AFL bid that was initially expected to enter that competition for 1996, and the loss of key forward Hodges for the entire minor round, won their sixth premiership in eight seasons in coach John Cahill's second stint. Central District, with high expectations from 1994, would be minor premiers for the second time and reach their first Grand Final, but unable to counter the Magpies' machine-like efficiency in critical situations.

== Home-and-away season ==
=== Round 1 ===
	Round 1
Friday, 17 March 1995 (7:30pm)	Glenelg 27.11 (173)	def.	Port Adelaide 11.15 (81)	Football Park (crowd: 12,589)
Saturday, 18 March 1995 (2:10pm)	Woodville-West Torrens 15.14 (104)	def.	North Adelaide 14.17 (101)	Football Park (crowd: 3,267)
Saturday, 18 March 1995 (2:10pm)	Central District 12.8 (80)	def.	Norwood 9.7 (61)	Elizabeth Oval (crowd: 3,020)
Saturday, 18 March 1995 (2:10pm)	West Adelaide 16.17 (113)	def.	Sturt 8.5 (53)	Richmond Oval (crowd: 2,389)
	Bye; South Adelaide

=== Round 2 ===
	Round 2
Saturday, 25 March 1995 (2:10pm)	South Adelaide 30.15 (195)	def.	Sturt 11.5 (71)	Football Park (crowd: 1,897)
Saturday, 25 March 1995 (2:10pm)	Norwood 17.13 (115)	def.	Glenelg 13.13 (91)	Norwood Oval (crowd: 4,642)
Saturday, 25 March 1995 (2:10pm)	North Adelaide 11.15 (81)	def. by	Port Adelaide 25.9 (159)	Prospect Oval (crowd: 4,918)
Saturday, 25 March 1995 (2:10pm)	Woodville-West Torrens 8.14 (62)	def. by	Central District 14.15 (99)	Woodville Oval (crowd: 2,789)
	Bye; West Adelaide
With debutant Del-Re kicking ten goals and Andrew Osborn returning from an eighteen-month absence due to stress fracture of his back another six, South Adelaide kick their highest score ever against the Double Blues and their third-highest against any opposition.

=== Round 3 ===
	Round 3
Saturday, 1 April 1995 (2:10pm)	West Adelaide 24.9 (153)	def.	South Adelaide 8.9 (57)	Richmond Oval (crowd: 2,320)
Saturday, 1 April 1995 (2:10pm)	Glenelg 15.13 (103)	def.	Woodville-West Torrens 11.15 (81)	Glenelg Oval (crowd: 3,474)
Saturday, 1 April 1995 (2:10pm)	Port Adelaide 19.8 (122)	def.	Norwood 9.10 (64)	Alberton Oval (crowd: 8,352)
Saturday, 1 April 1995 (2:10pm)	North Adelaide 9.7 (61)	def. by	Central District 13.8 (86)	Prospect Oval (crowd: 2,861)
	Bye; Sturt

=== Round 4 ===
	Round 4
Saturday, 8 April 1995 (2:10pm)	Norwood 15.15 (105)	def.	West Adelaide 12.10 (82)	Football Park (crowd: 3,420)
Saturday, 8 April 1995 (2:10pm)	Woodville-West Torrens 24.11 (155)	def.	Sturt 13.8 (86)	Woodville Oval
Saturday, 8 April 1995 (2:10pm)	South Adelaide 12.9 (81)	def.	North Adelaide 10.11 (71)	Adelaide Oval (crowd: 2,220)
Saturday, 8 April 1995 (2:10pm)	Central District 12.9 (81)	def.	Glenelg 10.9 (69)	Elizabeth Oval (crowd: 2,875)
	Bye; Port Adelaide

=== Round 5 ===
	Round 5
Saturday, 15 April 1995 (2:10pm)	Port Adelaide 23.13 (151)	def.	Central District 12.11 (83)	Football Park
Saturday, 15 April 1995 (2:10pm)	South Adelaide 19.21 (135)	def.	Woodville-West Torrens 8.16 (64)	Adelaide Oval
Saturday, 15 April 1995 (2:10pm)	North Adelaide 17.13 (115)	def.	West Adelaide 10.6 (66)	Prospect Oval
Saturday, 15 April 1995 (2:10pm)	Sturt 14.4 (88)	def. by	Norwood 16.17 (113)	Johnstone Park
	Bye; Glenelg
Previously winless North Adelaide comes back from five goals down as West kick 0.6 (6) in a fifteen-minute period of the third quarter where they almost completely controlled possession.

=== Round 6 (Anzac Day) ===
	Round 6
Saturday, 22 April 1995 (2:10pm)	Norwood 13.14 (92)	def. by	South Adelaide 16.10 (106)	Norwood Oval (crowd: 3,621)
Saturday, 22 April 1995 (2:10pm)	Glenelg 14.10 (94)	def.	West Adelaide 9.16 (70)	Glenelg Oval (crowd: 4,761)
Tuesday, 25 April 1995 (2:10pm)	Woodville-West Torrens 10.14 (74)	def. by	Port Adelaide 18.15 (123)	Football Park (crowd: 12,205)
Tuesday, 25 April 1995 (2:10pm)	Sturt 16.10 (106)	def. by	North Adelaide 21.15 (141)	Adelaide Oval (crowd: 4,278)
	Bye; Central District

=== Round 7 ===
	Round 7
Saturday, 29 April 1995 (2:10pm)	Glenelg 28.23 (191)	def.	Sturt 7.6 (48)	Glenelg Oval (crowd: 3,164)
Saturday, 29 April 1995 (2:10pm)	Port Adelaide 22.20 (152)	def.	South Adelaide 10.11 (71)	Alberton Oval
Saturday, 29 April 1995 (2:10pm)	Norwood 22.14 (146)	def.	Woodville-West Torrens 9.11 (65)	Norwood Oval
Saturday, 29 April 1995 (2:10pm)	West Adelaide 18.14 (122)	drew with	Central District 19.8 (122)	Richmond Oval (crowd: 2,396)
	Bye; North Adelaide

=== Round 8 ===
	Round 8
Saturday, 6 May 1995 (2:10pm)	Central District 14.16 (100)	def.	Sturt 11.10 (76)	Clare Oval (crowd: 2,166)
Saturday, 6 May 1995 (2:10pm)	Port Adelaide 21.11 (137)	def.	West Adelaide 14.12 (96)	Alberton Oval (crowd: 7,121)
Saturday, 6 May 1995 (2:10pm)	North Adelaide 21.13 (139)	def.	Norwood 10.15 (75)	Prospect Oval (crowd: 3,759)
Sunday, 7 May 1995 (2:10pm)	South Adelaide 8.16 (64)	def. by	Glenelg 16.15 (111)	Noarlunga Oval (crowd: 10,123)
	Bye; Woodville-West Torrens
In what proved Sturt's closest shave in their horrific season, the Double Blues lead Central District by 27 points midway through the third quarter before the Bulldogs awake from Clare's tranquility to kick 9.7 (61) to 1.4 (10) for the remainder of the match; The attendance for the match at Noarlunga Oval (since renamed to Hickinbotham Oval) remains a record for the ground as of 2026.

=== Round 9 ===
	Round 9
Monday, 15 May 1995 (2:10pm)	Port Adelaide 24.20 (164)	def.	Sturt 12.10 (82)	Football Park (crowd: 6,167)
Monday, 15 May 1995 (2:10pm)	Central District 19.16 (130)	def.	South Adelaide 9.5 (59)	Elizabeth Oval (crowd: 3,852)
Monday, 15 May 1995 (2:10pm)	Woodville-West Torrens 11.13 (79)	def. by	West Adelaide 15.11 (101)	Woodville Oval (crowd: 2,947)
Monday, 15 May 1995 (2:10pm)	Glenelg 13.5 (83)	def. by	North Adelaide 20.9 (129)	Glenelg Oval (crowd: 4,251)
	Bye; Norwood
Woodville-West Torrens' woes with only two wins so far are further exacerbated by the resignation of its general manager Geoff Hocking to become chief executive of the South Australians Baseball League.

=== Round 10 ===
	Round 10
Saturday, 20 May 1995 (2:10pm)	Sturt 10.13 (73)	def. by	West Adelaide 22.17 (149)	Adelaide Oval
Saturday, 20 May 1995 (2:10pm)	North Adelaide 10.16 (76)	def.	Woodville-West Torrens 9.13 (67)	Prospect Oval (crowd: 3,111)
Saturday, 20 May 1995 (2:10pm)	Port Adelaide 18.11 (119)	def.	Glenelg 13.6 (84)	Alberton Oval (crowd: 8,924)
Saturday, 20 May 1995 (2:10pm)	Central District 8.7 (55)	def. by	Norwood 9.12 (66)	Football Park
	Bye; South Adelaide

=== Round 11 ===
	Round 11
Saturday, 27 May 1995 (2:10pm)	Port Adelaide 9.15 (69)	def. by	North Adelaide 10.11 (71)	Football Park
Saturday, 27 May 1995 (2:10pm)	Sturt 10.10 (70)	def. by	South Adelaide 19.16 (130)	Adelaide Oval (crowd: 1,912)
Saturday, 27 May 1995 (2:10pm)	Glenelg 6.16 (52)	def. by	Norwood 20.21 (141)	Glenelg Oval (crowd: 2,961)
Saturday, 27 May 1995 (2:10pm)	Central District 23.9 (147)	def.	Woodville-West Torrens 9.8 (62)	Elizabeth Oval (crowd: 2,506)
	Bye; West Adelaide

=== Round 12 ===
	Round 12
Saturday, 3 June 1995 (2:10pm)	Central District 11.10 (76)	def. by	North Adelaide 14.15 (99)	Football Park3,085
Saturday, 3 June 1995 (2:10pm)	West Adelaide 17.16 (118)	def.	South Adelaide 9.12 (66)	Adelaide Oval (crowd: 2,099)
Sunday, 4 June 1995 (2:10pm)	Norwood 23.21 (159)	def.	Port Adelaide 10.7 (67)	Norwood Oval (crowd: 13,308)
Sunday, 4 June 1995 (2:10pm)	Woodville-West Torrens 20.16 (136)	def.	Glenelg 4.11 (35)	Bennett Oval, Whyalla (crowd: 3,039)
	Bye; Sturt

=== Round 13 ===
	Round 13
Saturday, 10 June 1995 (2:10pm)	West Adelaide 14.7 (91)	def.	Norwood 10.10 (70)	Richmond Oval (crowd: 2,953)
Saturday, 10 June 1995 (2:10pm)	Glenelg 13.6 (84)	def. by	Central District 14.14 (98)	Glenelg Oval (crowd: 2,151)
Saturday, 10 June 1995 (2:10pm)	Woodville-West Torrens 16.16 (112)	def.	Sturt 7.11 (53)	Football Park (crowd: 36,955 (Note: Played as the curtain-raiser to the Round 11 AFL game between Adelaide and Footscray.))
Saturday, 10 June 1995 (2:10pm)	South Adelaide 8.5 (53)	def.	North Adelaide 4.9 (33)	Noarlunga Oval
	Bye; Port Adelaide

=== Round 14 ===
	Round 14
Sunday, 18 June 1995 (2:10pm)	Sturt 7.8 (50)	def. by	Norwood 30.18 (198)	Adelaide Oval (crowd: 2,879)
Sunday, 18 June 1995 (2:10pm)	West Adelaide 13.9 (87)	def. by	North Adelaide 13.13 (91)	Richmond Oval (crowd: 3,013)
Sunday, 18 June 1995 (2:10pm)	Woodville-West Torrens 11.12 (78)	def. by	South Adelaide 13.11 (89)	Woodville Oval (crowd: 2,515)
Sunday, 18 June 1995 (2:10pm)	Central District 17.10 (112)	def.	Port Adelaide 6.7 (43)	Elizabeth Oval
	Bye; Glenelg

=== Round 15 ===
	Round 15
Saturday, 24 June 1995 (2:10pm)	Port Adelaide 23.14 (152)	def.	Woodville-West Torrens 8.16 (64)	Alberton Oval
Saturday, 24 June 1995 (2:10pm)	North Adelaide 15.18 (108)	def.	Sturt 11.11 (77)	Prospect Oval (crowd: 2,000)
Saturday, 24 June 1995 (2:10pm)	South Adelaide 10.5 (65)	def. by	Norwood 14.5 (89)	Noarlunga Oval (crowd: 3,826)
Saturday, 24 June 1995 (2:10pm)	Glenelg 10.10 (70)	def. by	West Adelaide 11.15 (81)	Football Park
	Bye; Central District
Fears that clubs would struggle to win at Noarlunga as they were known to at Elizabeth (Note: At this time, Norwood had not won at Elizabeth since 1980, although they played finals in every season except 1991 and 1992.) were laid to rest as Norwood overcome the ground's usual width win on a windswept afternoon.

=== Round 16 ===
	Round 16
Saturday, 1 July 1995 (2:10pm)	Central District 21.17 (143)	def.	West Adelaide 7.6 (48)	Football Park (crowd: 2,564)
Saturday, 1 July 1995 (2:10pm)	Sturt 14.12 (96)	def. by	Glenelg 26.15 (171)	Adelaide Oval (crowd: 2,403)
Saturday, 1 July 1995 (2:10pm)	Woodville-West Torrens 6.5 (41)	def. by	Norwood 31.13 (199)	Woodville Oval (crowd: 3,000 est.)
Saturday, 1 July 1995 (2:10pm)	South Adelaide 18.11 (119)	def.	Port Adelaide 14.5 (89)	Noarlunga Oval (crowd: 4,173)
	Bye; North Adelaide
Woodville–West Torrens suffered their biggest defeat on record, (Note: Woodville suffered five bigger losses – the biggest being 170 points against Glenelg in 1971. Other precursor club West Torrens suffered two bigger defeats, of which the biggest was 198 points to Central District in 1988.) and also the highest score they have ever conceded.; It also remains Norwood's biggest win, beating their 150-point victory over North Adelaide from 1977.

=== Round 17 ===
	Round 17
Saturday, 8 July 1995 (2:10pm)	Norwood 22.17 (149)	def.	North Adelaide 8.13 (61)	Football Park (crowd: 4,445)
Saturday, 8 July 1995 (2:10pm)	Glenelg 13.12 (90)	def. by	South Adelaide 18.11 (119)	Glenelg Oval (crowd: 2,320)
Saturday, 8 July 1995 (2:10pm)	West Adelaide 7.15 (57)	def. by	Port Adelaide 10.14 (74)	Richmond Oval (crowd: 4,296)
Saturday, 8 July 1995 (2:10pm)	Central District 28.16 (184)	def.	Sturt 7.9 (51)	Elizabeth Oval (crowd: 2,510)
	Bye; Woodville-West Torrens

=== Round 18 ===
	Round 18
Saturday, 15 July 1995 (2:10pm)	Woodville-West Torrens 13.12 (90)	def.	West Adelaide 11.16 (82)	Football Park (crowd: 3,291)
Saturday, 15 July 1995 (2:10pm)	Central District 20.18 (138)	def.	South Adelaide 5.9 (39)	Adelaide Oval (crowd: 2,465)
Saturday, 15 July 1995 (2:10pm)	Port Adelaide 22.17 (149)	def.	Sturt 9.6 (60)	Alberton Oval (crowd: 4,242)
Saturday, 15 July 1995 (2:10pm)	North Adelaide 21.15 (141)	def.	Glenelg 7.12 (54)	Prospect Oval (crowd: 2,286)
	Bye; Norwood

=== Round 19 ===
	Round 19
Saturday, 22 July 1995 (2:10pm)	Sturt 2.8 (20)	def. by	West Adelaide 21.22 (148)	Adelaide Oval
Saturday, 22 July 1995 (2:10pm)	Glenelg 9.8 (62)	def.	Port Adelaide 7.10 (52)	Glenelg Oval
Saturday, 22 July 1995 (2:10pm)	Woodville-West Torrens 3.9 (27)	def. by	North Adelaide 5.11 (41)	Woodville Oval
Saturday, 22 July 1995 (2:10pm)	Norwood 10.5 (65)	def.	Central District 5.7 (37)	Norwood Oval
	Bye; South Adelaide
On an extremely wet Saturday, Woodville-West Torrens kick its lowest score until Central District held it to two points fewer in Round 14, 2012.; North's win and Centrals' loss to Norwood leave the Bulldogs – pacesetters for most of the season – at risk of losing the double chance; Winless Sturt's score is its lowest since kicking 2.4 (16) against North Adelaide in July 1920. The Double Blues were goalless after the 24-minute mark of the first quarter

=== Round 20 ===
	Round 20
Saturday, 29 July 1995 (2:10pm)	South Adelaide 23.7 (145)	def.	Sturt 8.9 (57)	Noarlunga Oval (crowd: 1,737)
Saturday, 29 July 1995 (2:10pm)	Norwood 15.12 (102)	def.	Glenelg 13.18 (96)	Norwood Oval (crowd: 4,855)
Saturday, 29 July 1995 (2:10pm)	Port Adelaide 15.8 (98)	def.	North Adelaide 9.11 (65)	Alberton Oval (crowd: 7,575)
Sunday, 30 July 1995 (2:10pm)	Woodville-West Torrens 8.4 (52)	def. by	Central District 11.10 (76)	Football Park
	Bye; West Adelaide
Del-Re's 12 goals from 13 shots equalled the club record of "Diddy" Munro against Glenelg from 1936.

=== Round 21 ===
	Round 21
Saturday, 5 August 1995 (2:10pm)	Port Adelaide 12.10 (82)	def.	Norwood 11.9 (75)	Football Park (crowd: 12,417)
Saturday, 5 August 1995 (2:10pm)	Central District 17.8 (110)	def.	North Adelaide 13.10 (88)	Elizabeth Oval (crowd: 3,759)
Saturday, 5 August 1995 (2:10pm)	West Adelaide 21.12 (138)	def.	South Adelaide 16.9 (105)	Richmond Oval (crowd: 2,439)
Sunday, 6 August 1995 (2:10pm)	Woodville-West Torrens 14.15 (99)	def.	Glenelg 11.11 (77)	Woodville Oval (crowd: 2,773)
	Bye; Sturt
Port Adelaide defender Roger Delaney breaks his jaw in a sickening collision with Norwood's Paul McCormack, but unexpectedly would return for the finals.

=== Round 22 ===
	Round 22
Saturday, 12 August 1995 (2:10pm)	Central District 18.17 (125)	def.	Glenelg 15.4 (94)	Football Park (crowd: 2,889)
Saturday, 12 August 1995 (2:10pm)	Sturt 12.13 (85)	def. by	Woodville-West Torrens 25.15 (165)	Adelaide Oval (crowd: 2,248)
Saturday, 12 August 1995 (2:10pm)	Norwood 18.17 (125)	def.	West Adelaide 9.14 (68)	Norwood Oval (crowd: 6,487)
Saturday, 12 August 1995 (2:10pm)	North Adelaide 19.17 (131)	def.	South Adelaide 11.5 (71)	Prospect Oval (crowd: 2,943)
	Bye; Port Adelaide

=== Round 23 ===
	Round 23
Saturday, 19 August 1995 (2:10pm)	Glenelg 20.22 (142)	def.	Sturt 12.17 (89)	Glenelg Oval (crowd: 2,096)
Saturday, 19 August 1995 (2:10pm)	Central District 18.12 (120)	def.	West Adelaide 13.12 (90)	Elizabeth Oval (crowd: 3,851)
Saturday, 19 August 1995 (2:10pm)	Port Adelaide 28.13 (181)	def.	South Adelaide 14.15 (99)	Football Park
	Bye; North Adelaide, Norwood, Woodville-West Torrens

=== Round 24 ===
	Round 24
Saturday, 26 August 1995 (2:10pm)	North Adelaide 14.15 (99)	def. by	West Adelaide 16.5 (101)	Football Park (crowd: 2,676)
Saturday, 26 August 1995 (2:10pm)	Norwood 21.21 (147)	def.	Sturt 9.7 (61)	Norwood Oval (crowd: 4,143)
Saturday, 26 August 1995 (2:10pm)	Port Adelaide 15.16 (106)	def.	Central District 11.13 (79)	Alberton Oval (crowd: 11,682)
Saturday, 26 August 1995 (2:10pm)	South Adelaide 12.17 (89)	def.	Woodville-West Torrens 8.8 (56)	Noarlunga Oval (crowd: 2,515)
	Bye; Glenelg

=== Round 25 ===
	Round 25
Saturday, 2 September 1995 (2:10pm)	Woodville-West Torrens 18.5 (113)	def. by	Port Adelaide 29.9 (183)	Woodville Oval
Saturday, 2 September 1995 (2:10pm)	West Adelaide 25.13 (163)	def.	Glenelg 13.10 (88)	Richmond Oval
Saturday, 2 September 1995 (2:10pm)	Sturt 17.4 (106)	def. by	North Adelaide 24.14 (158)	Adelaide Oval
Saturday, 2 September 1995 (2:10pm)	Norwood 19.10 (124)	def.	South Adelaide 18.9 (117)	Football Park
	Bye; Central District
South Adelaide loses its finals berth at the last minute as James Thiessen kicks two late goals to knock out the Panthers.

== Ladder ==
1995 SANFL Ladder
Pos	Team	Pld	W	L	D	PF	PA	PP	Pts
1	Central District	22	16	5	1	2281	1648	58.06	33
2	Norwood	22	16	6	0	2480	1716	59.10	32
3	Port Adelaide (P)	22	16	6	0	2553	1943	56.78	32
4	North Adelaide	22	13	9	0	2100	1905	52.43	26
5	West Adelaide	22	11	10	1	2224	1996	52.70	23
6	South Adelaide	22	11	11	0	2074	2236	48.12	22
7	Glenelg	22	8	14	0	2114	2230	48.66	16
8	Woodville-West Torrens	22	7	15	0	1846	2278	44.76	14
9	Sturt	22	0	22	0	1558	3278	32.22	0

Rules for classification: 1) points; 2) percentage; 3) number of points for.
(P) Premiers

== Finals series ==
=== Elimination and Qualifying Finals ===
1995 SANFL Elimination Final
Saturday, 9 September 1995 (12:30 P.M.)	North Adelaide	def.	West Adelaide	Football Park (crowd: 25,895 (Note: Since the Elimination and Qualifying Finals were held at the same ground on the same day, the attendance figure is the same))
4.4 (28); 5.6 (36); 11.11 (77); 14.14 (98)	Q1; Q2; Q3; Final	1.2 (8); 4.9 (33); 6.10 (46); 11.12 (78)	Umpires: Michael Abbott, Doddridge, Elliott
Parker, Bennett 3.1, Rosenbloom 2.2, Atkinson 2.1, Francou, Jeffries 1.1, Soderstrom, Robertson 1.0, Sanders, Squire, Bamford, Allan 0.1	Goals	Wheeldon 2.3, Carlson, Kilpatrick 2.0, Mellor 1.2, Symes, Sinister, Barrett 1.1, McKinnon 1.0, Bank, Thomas 0.1
Perkins, Gerke, Bamford, Tasker, Bennett, Sanders, Viney, Atkinson, Grantham	Best	Carlson, Watkins, Kilpatrick, Barrett, Banik, Edwards, Patterson
Sanford (shoulder); Saunders (corked thigh)	Injuries
Reports	Simister for allegedly striking Sandford with an elbow in third quarter Fielke for attempting to strike North Adelaide runner Pierre Bourdon in final quarter
Handicapped by the ineligibility of Modra despite Adelaide missing the AFL finals and his relegation to the SANFL late in the season, (Note: Modra needed to play three SANFL games to be eligible for the finals, and he was dropped from the Adelaide team for that number, but the Bloods dropped him from the Round 21 game with South Adelaide on disciplinary grounds.) West fails badly in attack and cannot stay with a Rooster team heavily hit by injuries and the late withdrawal of Phillips.

1995 SANFL Qualifying Final
Saturday, 9 September 1995 (3:20 P.M.)	Norwood	def. by	Port Adelaide	Football Park (crowd: 25,895)
1.4 (10); 4.6 (30); 6.11 (47); 9.14 (68)	Q1; Q2; Q3; Final	3.5 (23); 5.7 (37); 8.9 (57); 12.12 (84)	Umpires: Chambers, Pfeiffer, Swaffer
Thiessen 2.2, Harvey 2.0, Prime 1.4, Reade 1.2, James, Growden 1.1, Russell 1.0, Cowham 0.1	Goals	West 4.3, Rohan Smith 2.0, Williams, Hodges, Borlase, Francis 1.1, Ginever, Brown 1.0, Darren Smith 0.1
Maynard (best on ground), Daniels, Harvey, James, Rowe, Clements, Primus	Best	Fiacchi, Malakellis, West, Northeast, Darcy, Ambrose, Carter, Wilson, Leys
Rowe (thigh); Smart (hamstring)	Injuries	Brown (knee); Borlase (knee)

=== Semi-Finals ===
1995 SANFL First Semi-Final
Saturday, 16 September 1995 (12:30 P.M.)	Norwood	def.	North Adelaide	Football Park
6.3 (39); 12.3 (75); 17.8 (110); 17.9 (111)	Q1; Q2; Q3; Final	3.0 (18); 6.2 (38); 9.5 (59); 15.10 (100)	Umpires: Bettridge, Doddridge, Pfeiffer
Reade 4.1, Thiessen 3.2, Robran 3.0, Rowe 2.0, Harvey, Macintosh 1.1, Bairne, Clements, Maynard 1.0, Prime 0.2, Growden 0.1	Goals	Bamford 4.1, Atkinson 3.0, Bennett 2.0, Jeffries 1.2, Parker 1.1, France, Hunan, Robertson, Allan 1.0, Soderstrom 0.2, Saunders, Rosenbloom, Squire 0.1
Primus (best on ground), Thiessen, Harvey, Macintosh, Maynard, Clements, Reade, Russell, James	Best	Sanders, Bamford, Robertson, Perkins, Atkinson, Nunan
Robran (ankle); Cowham (knee)	Injuries	Grantham (hamstring); Phillips (ankle)

1995 SANFL Second Semi-Final
Saturday, 16 September 1995 (3:20 P.M.)	Central District	def. by	Port Adelaide	Football Park
1.0 (6); 6.4 (40); 7.7 (49); 12.10 (82)	Q1; Q2; Q3; Final	5.9 (39); 7.14 (56); 10.18 (78); 11.18 (84)	Umpires: Michael Abbott, Burton, Chambers
Cook 4.1, Conway 3.1, Waken 2.0, Healy 1.2	Goals	Hodges 3.1, Rohan Smith 2.0, Waterhouse 1.2, Stephen Williams, Ginever 1.1, Anderson, Darcy, Darren Smith 1.0, Spiro Malakellis 0.4, Tony Malakellis, West, Francis 0.2
Girdham, McKinnon, Reimers, Arnold, Cotton, Cook, Lee	Best	Rohan Smith (best on ground), Ginever, Tony Malakellis, Wilson, Carter, Darcy, Poole, West, Leys
Wynd (broken leg)	Injuries	Ambrose (knee)

=== Preliminary Final ===
1995 SANFL Preliminary Final
Sunday, 24 September 1995	Central District	def.	Norwood	Football Park (crowd: 16,327)
1.2 (8); 5.10 (40); 6.13 (49); 9.15 (69)	Q1; Q2; Q3; Final	1.2 (8); 3.3 (21); 6.9 (45); 6.9 (45)	Umpires: Burton, Chalmers, Pfeiffer
Luhrs, Abbott, Cook 1.2, Potter, Ingerson 1.1, McKinnon, Macgowan, Conway, Cotton 1.0, Healy 0.2, Windsor 0.1	Goals	Reade, Balme 2.1, Millar, Irvin 1.0, Smart, D'Antiochia, Davey, Russell 0.1
McKinnon, Lee, Macgowan, Potter, Healy, Cotton, Haralda, Girdham, Reimers	Best	Primus (best on ground), Davey, Millar, Harvey, Maynard, D'Antiochia, Reade
P. Green (knee); Potter (knee); Girdham (stitches to eye)	Injuries	Growden (corked thigh)

=== Grand Final ===
1995 SANFL Grand Final
Sunday 1 October (2:10 pm)	Port Adelaide	def.	Central District	Football Park (crowd: 45,786)
3.7 (25); 3.11 (29); 8.14 (62); 13.16 (94)	Q1; Q2; Q3; Final	0.2 (2); 3.6 (24); 4.7 (31); 6.10 (46)	Umpires: Tim Pfeiffer, Kevin Chambers, Mick Abbott; Jack Oatey Medallist: Anthony Darcy; Television broadcast: ABC
C. Waterhouse, A. Darcy, T. Malakellis 2 F. Francis, R. West, S. Williams, S. Carter, T. Ginever, S. Hodges, D. Mead 1	Goals	2 R. Windsor; 1 M. Wakelin, J. Cotton, S. Schwerdt, S. Stevens
Ginever, Darcy, Rohan Smith, Leys, Tony Malakellis, Carter, Anderson, Williams, Wilson	Best	Lee, Macgowan, Reimers, Haralda, Stevens
Fiacchi for striking Wakelin	Reports	Abbott for striking Mead in third quarter Wakelin for striking Fiacchi in third quarter

== Notable events ==
- Sturt, by finishing winless over a 22-game season, set the unwanted record of the longest winless season in a major Australian Rules league. The Double Blues also were further from winning a game than any other winless team in SANFL history, not losing any game by fewer than 24 points.
