= 1995 SANFL Grand Final =

| Port Adelaide | Central District |
|---|---|
| 13.16 (94) | 6.10 (46) |
| | 1 | 2 | 3 | 4 |
|---|---|---|---|---|
| PA | 3.7 (25) | 3.11 (29) | 8.14 (62) | 13.16 (94) |
| CD | 0.2 (2) | 3.6 (24) | 4.7 (31) | 6.10 (46) |
- Date: Sunday 1 October 1995
- Stadium: Football Park
- Attendance: 45,786
- Umpires: Tim Pfeiffer, Kevin Chambers, and Mick Abbott.
- Coin toss won by: Central District
- Kicked toward: South End

Accolades
- Best on Ground: Anthony Darcy

Broadcast in Australia
- Network: ABC

The 1995 South Australian National Football League (SANFL) Grand Final saw the Port Adelaide Magpies defeat the Central District Bulldogs by 48 points. The match was played on Sunday 1 October 1995 at Football Park in front of a crowd of 45,786.

This was Port Adelaide's 33rd premiership, and Central District's first grand final since their admission to the league in 1964.

== Background ==
Port Adelaide had won five of the preceding seven premierships since coach Cahill had returned to the club in 1988, and had won their last eight Grand Finals under his coaching. The Magpies, handicapped by a major knee injury to star forward Scott Hodges before the minor round began, would finish that minor round only third, half a game behind Central District, but with Hodges playing his first games for the season defeated both Norwood and Central District to gain the week's break before the Grand Final.

The previous season, Central District had won its first final since 1972, and this created great expectations for 1995. The Bulldogs would meet these expectations by winning their second minor premiership, (Note: The Bulldogs' first minor premiership was in 1979, when they lost the Second Semi to Port Adelaide and the Preliminary to South Adelaide.) but in the second semi-final would lose their eighth final of eight to Port despite coach Stewart believing they should have been helped by the two weeks' break including a last-round bye.

The 1995 Grand Final was unusual in that both coaches were not certain to continue with their clubs. Alan Stewart had already announced he would leave Centrals after 1995 whether they won or lost the premiership, whilst Cahill was in doubt as to whether he would be coaching in the SANFL or the AFL. Cahill would ultimately step down for Stephen Williams midway through the 1996 season.

== Teams and statistics ==
Port Adelaide was captained by Tim Ginever and coached by John Cahill. Central District was captained by Roger Girdham and coached by Alan Stewart.

Port Adelaide
| B: | 4 George Fiacchi | 7 Roger Delaney | 5 Brian Leys |
| HB: | 15 Michael Wilson | 32 Paul Northeast | 36 Stephen Carter |
| C: | 9 Anthony Darcy | 29 Robbie West | 13 Rohan Smith |
| HF: | 41 Clive Waterhouse | 30 Darryl Poole | 28 Darren Smith |
| F: | 10 Stephen Williams | 11 Scott Hodges | 40 Spiro Malakellis |
| Foll: | 33 Darren Mead | 1 Tim Ginever (c) | 22 Tony Malakellis |
| Int: | 8 Greg Anderson | 46 Fabian Francis | 26 Richard Foster |
| Coach: | John Cahill | | |

Central District
| B: | Scott Lee (12) | Ray Windsor (22) | Roy Laird (27) |
| HB: | Martin McKinnon (21) | Brian Haraida (19) | Hugh Reimers (5) |
| C: | Scott Stevens (15) | Ricky MacGowan (23) | Daniel Healy (51) |
| HF: | David Green (18) | Simon Luhrs (25) | Jarrod Cotton (44) |
| F: | Anthony Ingerson (57) | Michael Wakelin (9) | Tim Cook (6) |
| Foll: | Damien Arnold (26) | Stephen Schwerdt (40) | Roger Girdham (c) (10) |
| Int: | Chris Pyman (54) | John Abbott (7) | Mark Conway (33) |
| Coach: | Alan Stewart | | |

== Umpires ==
The game was umpired by Tim Pfeiffer, Kevin Chambers, and Mick Abbott.

== Scorecard ==
1995 SANFL Grand Final
1 October 1995 (2:10 pm) | Port Adelaide | def. | Central District | Football Park (crowd: 45,786)
3.7 (25); 3.11 (29); 8.14 (62); 13.16 (94) | Q1; Q2; Q3; Final | 0.2 (2); 3.6 (24); 4.7 (31); 6.10 (46) | Jack Oatey Medallist: Anthony Darcy; Television broadcast: ABC
C. Waterhouse, A. Darcy, T. Malakellis 2 F. Francis, R. West, S. Williams, S. Carter, T. Ginever, S. Hodges, D. Mead 1 | Goals | 2 R. Windsor; 1 M. Wakelin, J. Cotton, S. Schwerdt, S. Stevens
A. Darcy, T. Ginever, B. Leys, D. Mead | Best | R. Macgowan, H. Reimers
Fiacchi by field umpire Chambers and boundary umpire Sheppard for striking Wakelin in third quarter | Reports | John Abbott by field umpire Abbott for striking Mead in third quarter Wakelin by field umpire Chambers and boundary umpire Sheppard for striking Fiacchi in third quarter

== Jack Oatey Medal ==
The Jack Oatey Medal for best player in the Grand Final was awarded to Anthony Darcy of Port Adelaide. For the third year in a row, AFL club St Kilda drafted the Jack Oatey medallist, following on from Steven Sziller and Darryl Wakelin.
