= Malakellis =

Malakellis is a surname. Notable people with the surname include:

- Spiro Malakellis (born 1968), Australian rules footballer
- Tony Malakellis (born 1970), Australian rules footballer, brother of Spiro
