= Mark Conway =

Mark Conway may refer to:

- Mark Conway (Australian footballer) (born 1973), Australian rules footballer
- Mark Conway, former guitarist for Beowülf and Symbol Six
- Mark Conway (politician) (born 1989), American politician, member of Baltimore City Council
- Mark Conway, British politician who leads Alliance for Democracy and Freedom
- Mark Conway (rugby league) (born 1964), English rugby league footballer
