= Maroochy/North Shore Australian Football Club =

Maroochy-North Shore Roos

Names
- Full name: Maroochy-North Shore Australian Football Club
- Nickname(s): Kangaroos

Club details
- Colours: Blue, White and Light Grey ( logo and alternative guernsey is Green and Yellow )
- Competition: Queensland Australian Football League
- President: Craig Scrase
- Coach: Roger Delaney
- Captain(s): Ryan White
- Ground(s): Fisherman's Road

Other information
- Official website: Maroochy North Shore sportingpulse website
- Guernsey

Maroochy North Shore Australian Football Club was an Australian rules football club based on the Sunshine Coast which competed in the Pineapple Hotel Cup division of the Queensland Australian Football League from 2005 to 2011.

== Demerger ==
Seven years after Maroochydore and Northshore amalgamated for mutual gain in the senior ranks, the former has severed the partnership and gone it alone.

The decision to de-amalgamate was reached when Maroochydore held a special general meeting on 29 March. The new entity will be known as the Maroochydore Australian Football Club, or the Roos.

That was the name of the club when it folded at the end of the 1999 season, before its rebirth as Maroochy Northshore for the start of the 2005 season.

Northshore will be known as the Northshore Jets Australian Football Club.
