= Milan Faletic =

Australian rules footballer

Personal information
- Full name: Milan Faletic
- Born: 8 March 1953 (age 73)
- Height: 191 cm (6 ft 3 in)
- Weight: 88 kg (194 lb)

Playing career^{1}
Years	Club	Games (Goals)
1971–1977	West Torrens	151 (133)
1978–1983	Port Adelaide	78 (106)
1981–1982	St Kilda	24 (33)
Total		253 (272)
- ^{1} Playing statistics correct to the end of 1983.

Milan Faletic (born 8 March 1953) is a former Australian rules footballer who played with St Kilda in the Victorian Football League (VFL). He also played for West Torrens and Port Adelaide in the South Australian National Football League (SANFL).

== Personal life ==
Faletic, the son of Slovenian immigrants, was a state schoolboys representative for South Australia.

== West Torrens (1971–1977) ==
He started his career at West Torrens and was their leading goal-kicker in 1976.

== Port Adelaide (1978–1980) ==
In 1978 he joined Port Adelaide, where he was a member of two premiership teams, in 1979 and 1980. He won Port Adelaide's best and fairest award in the first of those premiership years. While at Port Adelaide he represented his state in three interstate matches.

== St Kilda (1981–1982) ==
At the age of 28, Faletic made his VFL debut in the opening round of the 1981 season and kicked five goals, against Footscray at Western Oval. He finished the year second in the goal-kicking at St Kilda, with 31 goals, three behind Con Gorozidis. The following year he made just three appearances.

== Port Adelaide (1983) ==
In 1983 he returned to Port Adelaide for one final season.
