= Stan Malin =

Australian rules footballer

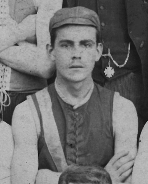

Personal information
- Full name: Stanley Arthur Malin
- Nickname: Sailor
- Born: 2 December 1878
- Died: 4 December 1903 (aged 25)
- Original team: Semaphore Wanderers FC
- Position: Centre Half Forward

Playing career
Years	Club	Games (Goals)
1898–1899	Port Adelaide	26

Career highlights
- Magarey Medal (1899)

Stanley Malin (1878–1903) was an Australian rules footballer who played with Port Adelaide in the SANFL.

Malin usually played across the half forward line or in the centre and played for Port Adelaide in 1898 and 1899. He won the Magarey Medal in 1899, making him the first Port Adelaide player to ever win the award.

In 1900 he left the club and moved to Sydney in order to study medicine. At the age of 25 he died after a brief illness in 1903.
