= Ray Windsor =

Australian rules footballer

Personal information
- Born: 11 August 1972 (age 54)
- Original team: Western Districts (QAFL)
- Height: 190 cm (6 ft 3 in)
- Weight: 87 kg (192 lb)

Playing career^{1}
Years	Club	Games (Goals)
1990–1993	Brisbane Bears	23 (22)
1994–1995	Central Districts	43 (19)
Total		66 (41)
- ^{1} Playing statistics correct to the end of 1995.

Career highlights
- Larke Medal 1989; Brisbane Bears reserves premiership 1991

Ray Windsor (born 11 August 1972) is a former Australian rules footballer who played with the Brisbane Bears in the AFL.

Following his delistment from Brisbane, Windsor moved to South Australian National Football League club Central District, where he was a member of their losing 1995 SANFL Grand Final team.
