= Clive Waterhouse =

Australian rules footballer (born 1974)

Personal information
- Full name: Clive Raymond Waterhouse
- Born: 23 June 1974 (age 52); England
- Original team: Port Adelaide (SANFL)
- Debut: Round 3, 14 April 1996, Fremantle vs. Carlton, at Subiaco Oval
- Height: 184 cm (6 ft 0 in)
- Weight: 88 kg (194 lb)

Playing career^{1}
Years	Club	Games (Goals)
1995 & 2005–2009	Port Adelaide (SANFL)	89 (208)
1996–2004	Fremantle	106 (178)
Total		195 (386)
- ^{1} Playing statistics correct to the end of 2007.

Career highlights
- AFL: Fremantle leading goalkicker 1998 (30); 2000 (53); Fremantle 25 since ‘95 Team; 1999 International Rules Series; SANFL: Port Adelaide premiership player (1995)

Clive Raymond Waterhouse (born 23 June 1974 in England) is a former Australian rules footballer. He played in the Australian Football League (AFL) for the Fremantle Football Club as a half-forward flanker.

== Early life ==
Waterhouse was born in England to a bricklayer and moved to South Australia with his aunt and her three children, followed later by his father.

Despite being a late starter to Australian Rules, having mainly played soccer until the age of 17, Waterhouse played junior Australian Rules for the Para Hills Football Club where he won the best and fairest in an undefeated team. He was invited to play Under 19s with powerhouse club Port Adelaide and after an outstanding season for Port Adelaide in the South Australian National Football League (SANFL), including being a member of the 1995 premiership team, became the number 1 pick in the 1995 AFL draft.

== Fremantle ==
Waterhouse made his AFL debut in round 3, 1996, against the reigning premiers Carlton. Despite Carlton being on an 18-game winning streak, Fremantle won by 53 points. Waterhouse was quiet, with only two kicks, but did manage a goal. He vacillated between the Dockers and Swan Districts for the remainder of the year, finishing with 11 AFL games for nine goals, though he did kick nine goals against South Fremantle in the twelfth WAFL round.

1997 and 1998 were inconsistent seasons for Waterhouse, and he was dropped from the team and injured numerous times. Despite only playing 16 games in 1998, Waterhouse was Fremantle's leading goalkicker, with 30 goals.

1999 saw the recruiting of Adelaide Crows star full-forward Tony Modra to Fremantle. Modra and Waterhouse would make a dangerous pairing for the following two seasons, combining for over 100 goals each year. Waterhouse played all bar one game and finished third in the best and fairest award in those two seasons before injuries took their toll from 2001 onwards. He also represented Australia in the International rules series against Ireland in 1999. Round 21, 2000, would be Waterhouse's greatest on-field moment. In the infamous Demolition Derby against the West Coast Eagles, Waterhouse sparked a last-half comeback from being 42 points behind, six minutes into the third quarter. His career-high seven goals earned him three Brownlow Medal votes and helped Fremantle to their greatest-ever comeback to win by 1 point.

== Injuries and career decline ==
A broken collarbone sustained during a pre-season game against Geelong at Fremantle Oval would delay his start to the 2001 season until round 3 and repeated hamstring strains would restrict him to only six games and ten goals for the season. 2002 was even worse, with an anterior cruciate ligament injury also occurring during a preseason game at Fremantle Oval ruling him out for the entire season. Waterhouse made his return to AFL football in round 4, 2003, but he couldn't recapture his form from 1999 or 2000 and was dropped after kicking only seven goals from eight games. Having played 99 games to this point, and with Fremantle going on to make the finals for the first time, many thought that Clive would be marooned one game short of the century. However, Waterhouse was named to play in the first game of 2004 to reach the milestone. He played a further six games in 2004 for seven goals before being delisted at the end of the season.

== Post-AFL career ==
Waterhouse then returned to Adelaide in 2005, where he continued to play football, rejoining Port Adelaide in the SANFL and becoming the team's leading goalscorer for 2005 with 71 goals.

In 2007, Waterhouse again injured his anterior cruciate ligament while playing in the SANFL.

Clive continued to play for the magpies till 2009, when just after three rounds he announced his retirement after being dropped to the reserves for round 4.

Wearing Guernsey number 26 from throughout his AFL career, he was the first player to score 100 goals for Fremantle. He retired with 178 goals, a club record until Matthew Pavlich surpassed this in 2006.
