= Robbie West =

Australian rules footballer

Personal information
- Born: 7 March 1969 (age 57)
- Original team: Wodonga (O&MFL)
- Height: 178 cm (5 ft 10 in)
- Weight: 77 kg (170 lb)

Playing career^{1}
Years	Club	Games (Goals)
1991–93	West Coast	13 (4)
1991-93	West Perth (WAFL)	47 (46)
1994	Footscray	7 (1)
1995–97	Port Adelaide (SANFL)	32 (38)
Total		99 (89)

Representative team honours
Years	Team	Games (Goals)
1991-1992	Western Australia	2 (0)
- ^{1} Playing statistics correct to the end of 1997.

Career highlights
- West Perth best and fairest: 1992; Sandover Medal: 1992; John Cahill Medal: 1995

Robbie West (born 7 March 1969) is a former Australian rules footballer who played for the West Coast Eagles and Footscray in the Australian Football League (AFL).

Originally from Ovens & Murray Football Netball League club Wodonga, West was drafted by West Coast at the 1990 AFL draft and made his AFL debut in the 1991 AFL season. West was unable to break into West Coast's strong side, managed just three games in each of his first two seasons, instead playing most of his football with Western Australian Football League (WAFL) club West Perth, winning the Sandover Medal for best and fairest player in the WAFL as well as West Perth's Fairest and Best award.

West's most successful year in the AFL came in 1993 when he played 10 games and the following year he crossed to Footscray for one season.

In 1995 he joined South Australian National Football League (SANFL) club Port Adelaide, playing 25 games, playing in Port's premiership team, and winning the club's best and fairest award. West was the victim of an assault in late 1995 that left him fighting for his life. West recovered and after rehabilitation played for Port Adelaide again in 1997, playing seven league games and 14 reserves games. Not surprisingly, West never regained his form of 1995, but it was a major feat that he was able to recover and return to league football.

== Personal life ==
West's son, Connor West was drafted to West Coast in the 2021 mid-season rookie draft, and made his debut in round 18 of the 2021 season.
