= Darren Mead =

Australian rules footballer (born 1971)

Personal information
- Full name: Darren Mead
- Born: 29 March 1971 (age 55)
- Original team: Port Adelaide (SANFL)
- Draft: No. 107, 1988 national draft
- Height: 193 cm (6 ft 4 in)
- Weight: 98 kg (216 lb)
- Position: Centre half-back

Playing career^{1}
| Years | Club | Games (Goals) |
| 1989–1996 | Port Adelaide (SANFL) | 116 (17) (Note: These tallies refer to premiership matches (home-and-away and finals matches) only.) |
| 1997–2002 | Port Adelaide (AFL) | 122 (8) |
| Total | | 238 (25) |

Representative team honours
| Years | Team | Games (Goals) |
| | South Australia | 2 (0) |
- ^{1} Playing statistics correct to the end of 2002.

Career highlights
- 3x Port Adelaide premiership player (1994, 1995, 1996); John Cahill Medal (1997); Showdown Medal: Showdown I

Darren Mead (born 29 March 1971) is a former Australian rules footballer with the Port Adelaide Football Club in the South Australian National Football League (SANFL) and Australian Football League (AFL).

== Football career ==
After being a strong part of the Port Adelaide Football Club in the SANFL, he was retained as part of Port's entry into the Australian Football League competition in 1997. However, he was initially drafted by Essendon during the 1988 VFL draft at selection 107: Mead, to turn 18 soon after for the 1989 season, did not take up the offer from Windy Hill.

Mead was awarded Port Adelaide's best and fairest in the club's first year participating in the AFL. He was a strong competitor at centre half-back and also occasionally played in the ruck. He became the first Port Adelaide Power player to play 100 games in 2001, and was one of the leaders of the club throughout his AFL career, which lasted from 1997 through to 2002.
