= Anthony Darcy =

Australian rules footballer

Personal information
- Full name: Anthony Darcy
- Born: 22 March 1972 (age 54)
- Original team: Cobden (HFL)
- Height: 184 cm (6 ft 0 in)
- Weight: 83 kg (183 lb)

Playing career^{1}
Years	Club	Games (Goals)
1992	Geelong	1 (0)
1993–1994	Footscray	14 (2)
1995	Port Adelaide (SANFL)	
1996	St Kilda	3 (0)
Total		18 (2)
- ^{1} Playing statistics correct to the end of 1996.

Anthony Darcy (born 22 March 1972) is a former Australian rules footballer who played for Geelong, Footscray and St Kilda in the Australian Football League (AFL) during the 1990s.

Darcy, originally from Hampden Football League club Cobden, made just one appearance with Geelong in 1992. He was traded to Footscray and played 12 games in 1993, the closest he ever got to a full AFL season.

After only breaking into Footscray's seniors twice in 1994, one of those a Semi Final, Darcy spent the 1995 season at Port Adelaide in the South Australian National Football League. He had 36 disposals in their Grand Final win that year to claim the Jack Oatey Medal and on the back of this performance was lured back to the AFL by St Kilda, although he only added a further three games in 1996 to his AFL tally.

Darcy was previously married to celebrity vet Katrina Warren. Warren gave birth to their daughter Charlotte Darcy in 2007.
