= Mark Conway (Australian footballer) =

Australian rules footballer

Personal information
- Full name: Mark Conway
- Born: 20 May 1973 (age 53); Wagga Wagga NSW
- Original teams: Mangoplah Cookardinia United, (NSW) / Central District
- Height: 197 cm (6 ft 6 in)
- Weight: 96 kg (212 lb)

Playing career^{1}
Years	Club	Games (Goals)
1997	Port Adelaide	1 (0)
- ^{1} Playing statistics correct to the end of 1997.

Mark Conway (born 20 May 1973) is a former Australian rules footballer who played with Port Adelaide in the Australian Football League (AFL).

Conway, a tall forward, topped Central District's goal-kicking in 1996, with 57 goals.

When Port Adelaide formed a squad for their inaugural AFL season, Conway was picked up from Central District as a zone selection, along with teammates Jarrod Cotton, Stuart Dew and Nathan Steinberner. He played just one senior AFL game for Port Adelaide, which was in round 14 of the 1997 season, against Hawthorn at Waverley Park. The 24-year-old had five disposals.

He was a member of the Sturt team which won the 2002 SANFL premiership, over his former club Central District.
