= Brian Leys =

Australian rules footballer

Personal information
- Born: 7 February 1968 (age 58)
- Original team: Trafalgar
- Height: 194 cm (6 ft 4 in)
- Weight: 94 kg (207 lb)

Playing career^{1}
Years	Club	Games (Goals)
1988–1994	Richmond	110 (19)
1995–1999	Port Adelaide (SANFL)	91
- ^{1} Playing statistics correct to the end of 1999.

Career highlights
- Port Adelaide premierships (1995, 1996, 1998, 1999)

Brian Leys (born 7 February 1968) is a former Australian rules footballer who played with Richmond in the Australian Football League (AFL) and Port Adelaide in the South Australian National Football League (SANFL).

Leys, a defender from Trafalgar, played seven seasons for Richmond, from 1988 to 1994. He spent the next stage of his career in South Australia, playing with SANFL club Port Adelaide, mainly as a centre half back. In his five seasons at Port Adelaide he was member of four premiership teams, in 1995, 1996, 1998 and 1999.

In November 2009, Leys was appointed Chief Executive of the Perth Football Club. Leys returned to Port Adelaide in 2012, as general manager. He resigned from his role in May 2013, for family reasons. In 2016 he returned to coaching as the coach of the Glenunga Rams Football Club, a Adelaide Football League team. In his second season coaching the Rams he steered them to a premiership.
