= Spiro Malakellis =

Australian rules footballer (born 1968)

Personal information
- Born: 23 April 1968 (age 58); Walgett, NSW
- Original team: Geelong Amateurs
- Draft: No. 20, 1989 pre-season draft
- Height: 175 cm (5 ft 9 in)
- Weight: 75 kg (165 lb)

Playing career^{1}
Years	Club	Games (Goals)
1989–1993	Geelong	67 (18)
1995–1997	Port Adelaide (SANFL)	17 (9)
Total		84 (27)
- ^{1} Playing statistics correct to the end of 1993.

Spiro Malakellis (born 23 April 1968) is a former Australian rules footballer who played for the Geelong football club in the Australian Football League (AFL) and Port Adelaide Football Club in the South Australian National Football League (SANFL). He is the older brother of fellow AFL footballer Tony Malakellis.

The third of seven children, Malakellis was born in Walgett in 1968 and grew up in Portarlington before his family moved to Geelong, where his parents ran a fish and chips shop. Malakellis attended Geelong High School, where he and his brother learned to play football, and then studied civil engineering at RMIT University. He admitted that during his school days he was a North Melbourne supporter and wore Malcolm Blight's number 15, which turned out to be somewhat prophetic as he would play his whole AFL career with Blight as his coach.

Malakellis started his football career at Geelong Amateurs, and showed enough promise for Geelong to select him with pick 20 in the VFL pre-season draft at the end of 1988. However, during the summer training period, Malakellis was restricted by a knee injury and was not included in Geelong's final squad list for 1989. Disappointed but undeterred, Malakellis nominated for the internal draft and was allowed to continue training with the Cats. He was subsequently redrafted after his performance in a practice match convinced the selectors and coaches that his knee could cope, and was given the guernsey number 12, which he would wear for his whole career with Geelong.

After impressing in the VFL Reserves, Malakellis was selected for his senior VFL debut in Round 7 of the 1989 VFL season against St Kilda at Kardinia Park. Under Malcolm Blight, the Cats had become one of Australian football's most electrifying teams; in the previous Round 6 clash against the reigning premiers Hawthorn, they had coughed up a 49-point lead at half-time to lose by 8 points, setting an unwanted League record for the highest losing score in the process. Malakellis was one of three changes made, along with Bruce Lindner and Neville Bruns, and was named in the forward pocket.

Malakellis' debut proved to be a memorable one, as the Cats registered their highest League score to that point, blowing the Saints away in the second half to finish with the remarkable score of 35.18 (228), just ten points shy of the League record set by Fitzroy back in 1979. Malakellis was not one of the 12 Geelong players to kick a goal but was nonetheless prolific, being credited with 22 disposals (11 kicks and 11 handpasses) on the official team stat sheet.

After finishing with Geelong, Malakellis spent three seasons playing with Port Adelaide Magpies in the SANFL commencing in the 1995 premiership winning side with his brother Tony.
