= Tony Malakellis =

Australian rules footballer

Personal information
- Full name: Tony Malakellis
- Born: 24 March 1970 (age 56)
- Original team: Geelong Amateurs
- Height: 175 cm (5 ft 9 in)
- Weight: 79 kg (174 lb)

Playing career^{1}
Years	Club	Games (Goals)
1990–1991	Geelong	14 (12)
1993	Sydney Swans	5 (3)
1994–1998	Port Adelaide (SANFL)	70 (81)
Total		89 (96)
- ^{1} Playing statistics correct to the end of 1993.

Career highlights
- 2x SANFL premiership (1994) (1995)

Tony Malakellis (born 24 March 1970) is a former Australian rules footballer who played with Geelong and the Sydney Swans in the Australian Football League (AFL) and is the younger brother of Spiro Malakellis.

Recruited locally, Malakellis made nine appearances for Geelong in 1990, all in the second half of the season. On his debut that year, against Carlton at Princes Park, Malakellis earned a Brownlow Medal vote for his 23 disposals and two goals. He played only five games in 1991 and didn't feature at all in the 1992 AFL season. Sydney secured his services in 1993 but he spent just one year at the club, before moving to South Australia and signing with Port Adelaide. He played 70 games for Port Adelaide, until retiring in 1998, and was a member of their 1994 and 1995 premiership teams. In 1994, he was a runner up for the SANFL Magery Medal count.
