= Roger Delaney =

Australian rules footballer

Personal information
- Full name: Roger Delaney
- Nickname: Batman
- Born: 27 February 1966 (age 60)
- Original teams: Port Adelaide, (SANFL)
- Draft: No. 23, 1989 VFL Draft

Playing career^{1}
Years	Club	Games (Goals)
1990	Fitzroy	1 (0)
1984–89, 91–97	Port Adelaide	208 (13)
- ^{1} Playing statistics correct to the end of 1997.

Career highlights
- 6x Port Adelaide premiership player (1988, 1989, 1992, 1994, 1995, 1996)

Roger Delaney (born 27 February 1966) is a former Australian rules footballer who played for Fitzroy in the Australian Football League (AFL) in 1990. He was recruited from the Port Adelaide Football Club in the South Australian National Football League (SANFL) with the 23rd selection in the 1989 VFL Draft.

== Playing career ==
Delaney played over 200 games for Port Adelaide in the SANFL and after retiring from playing, he became an assistant coach to former Port teammate Mark Williams at Port Adelaide in the Australian Football League (AFL). For the 2011 season he became the coach of the Maroochy/North Shore Australian Football Club in the Queensland Australian Football League on the Sunshine Coast, Queensland.

== Family ==
Delaney is married to Jacqui Delaney, the former Australia netball international. They have three children, Yasmine (b. 1998) and twins Cooper and Jada (born c. 2006). The Delaneys settled in Sydney and then the Sunshine Coast. They live and work in the Coolum Beach/Peregian Beach/Noosa district.
