= Stephen Carter (footballer) =

Australian rules footballer

Personal information
- Full name: Stephen Carter
- Born: 5 February 1974 (age 52)
- Original team: Port Adelaide (SANFL)
- Draft: Zone Selection, 1996 AFL draft
- Height: 186 cm (6 ft 1 in)
- Weight: 89 kg (196 lb)

Playing career^{1}
Years	Club	Games (Goals)
1991–2003	Port Adelaide (SANFL)	172 (43)
1997	Port Adelaide (AFL)	10 (0)
- ^{1} Playing statistics correct to the end of 1997.

Career highlights
- 5x Port Adelaide SANFL premiership player (1994, 1995, 1996, 1998, 1999); Inaugural side for Port Adelaide's first game in the AFL.

Stephen Carter (born 5 February 1974) is a former Australian rules footballer who played with Port Adelaide in the Australian Football League (AFL).

In the 1994 AFL draft, Carter was selected by Essendon with pick 39, but he decided to remain in South Australia and wait for Port Adelaide's entry to the league in 1997. He already played for Port Adelaide in the South Australian National Football League (SANFL) and was a zone selection for the AFL club.

Carter made 10 appearances for Port Adelaide in the 1997 AFL season, including their first ever game, against Collingwood at the MCG, but was delisted at the end of the year.

A half back flanker, he was a member of five Port Adelaide premiership teams in the SANFL during the 1990s.

1996 Port Adelaide guernsey on display in the State Library of South Australia featuring signatures from Stephen Carter, John Cahill and Tim Ginever.
