= Jarrod Cotton =

Australian rules footballer and coach

Personal information
- Full name: Jarrod P. Cotton
- Born: 3 April 1976 (age 50)
- Original team: Central District
- Height: 185 cm (6 ft 1 in)
- Weight: 80 kg (176 lb)

Playing career^{1}
Years	Club	Games (Goals)
1997	Port Adelaide	4 (4)
- ^{1} Playing statistics correct to the end of 1997.

Jarrod Cotton (born 3 April 1976) is a former Australian rules footballer who played with Port Adelaide in the Australian Football League (AFL).

A half forward flanker originally from South Australian National Football League (SANFL) team Central District, Cotton played in consecutive losing SANFL Grand Finals in 1995 and 1996. He was recruited by Port Adelaide as a zone selection in their inaugural league season in 1997.

Cotton made his senior AFL debut against Carlton at Football Park in round 10 1997 and kicked two goals. He made three further appearances that season but was unable to break into Port's side in 1998 and was delisted at the end of the year.

Cotton transferred from Central District to fellow SANFL club Norwood in 1999 and played in another grand final loss that season. Cotton topped Norwood's goal-kicking in 2002 with 42 goals before crossing to a third SANFL club, South Adelaide in 2003 and then to Queensland Australian Football League (QAFL) side Mt Gravatt in 2004, which he both played for and assistant coached.

Following his retirement from playing, Cotton returned to South Australia and was appointed caretaker coach of Norwood Football Club for the final seven rounds of the 2009 SANFL season, following the resignation of coach Trevor Hill. Cotton spent 2 years as a development coach at the Adelaide Crows before returning to Norwood as Director of coaching. At the end of the 2016 season, Cotton was appointed head coach of Norwood following the departure of premiership coach Ben Warren. In the latter stages of the 2018 SANFL season he extended his contract at Norwood, keeping him at the club until 2021. He now a coach for Port Adelaide SANFL team.
