= List of Port Adelaide Football Club players (before 1997) =

The Port Adelaide Football Club was founded in late April or early May 1870. The club played its first interclub match against a side called 'The Young Australians' in 1870 in the North Park Lands. In 1877 Port Adelaide joined seven other local clubs forming the South Australian Football Association, the first organisation of its type in Australia. From 1877 to 1996 Port Adelaide won 4 Championships of Australia, 34 SANFL premierships and 1 wartime SANFL premiership as a merged club with West Torrens. In 1990 the club approached the newly named AFL for entry but was eventually beaten by a composite proposal, the Adelaide Crows, by the SANFL. The AFL guaranteed Port Adelaide a place in the competition in 1994 and eventually entered in 1997.

== SANFL era players (1877–1996) ==
In 1877 Port Adelaide joined seven other local clubs and formed the South Australian Football Association, the first organisation of its type in Australia. In 1994, the AFL announced it would award a second AFL licence to a South Australian club. However a licence did not guarantee entry and although a target year of 1996 was set, this was reliant upon an existing AFL club folding or merging with another. In 1996, the cash-strapped Fitzroy announced it would merge with the Brisbane Bears to form the Brisbane Lions. A spot had finally opened and it was announced that in 1997, one year later than expected, Port Adelaide would enter the AFL.

Legend

– SANFL premiership player

– SANFL captain

– Championship of Australia team member (1880, 1910, 1913, 1914).

Name	PA career span (SANFL)	Debut	Games	Goals
Howard J. Abbott	1938–1940	1938	31	10
William A. Abernethy	1898-1901	1898	37	
Bruce Abernethy	1979–1981, 1987–1992	1979	190	115
John Abley	1950–1961	1950	212	1
Charles E. Adams	1898–1899	1898	5	4
Charles E. G. Adams	1919–1926	1919	94	4
D. Adams	1902	1902	2	
David Adams	1897	1897	51	
William J. Adolphus	1902	1902	5	
Ross Agius	1979–1984	1979	53	103
John Ahern	1992	1992	4	2
Darryl J. Alfred	1965	1965	5	
James A. Allingham	1932–1934	1932	38	1
Maurice Allingham	1920–1931	1920	158	166
Richard Ambrose	1994–1998	1994	52	29
Charles A. Andersen	1909, 1912–1915	1909	35	24
Charles H. Andersen	1932–1935	1932	6	
Greg Anderson	1983–1987, 1995–1996	1983, round 5	150	87
W. Anderson		1901	40	
Damien Angove	1993–1996	1993	51	28
Eddie J. Arkitt	1969	1969	6	
Harold. S. Ashby	1902	1902	83	
William J. Ashley	1912–1915, 1919	1912	70	65
John A. Atkins	1878–1880	1878	38	
Frederick C. E. Badcock	1923–1925	1923	25	10
David B. Baker	1960	1960	6	
David J. Baker	1982–1986	1982	63	8
Keith Baker	1970–1972	1972	31	44
Colin B. Bald	1986–1987	1986	14	
Anthony D. Bamford	1996–2003	1996	78	58
Basil G. Bampton	1931–1941	1931	147	9
Peter A. Bampton	1919–1928	1919	137	5
Norman Barker	1923	1923	11	5
Alexander J. Barr	1935	1935	6	
Edward C. Barrett	1878	1878	24	
Darren Bartsch	1994	1994	10	2
John C. Baruzzi	1969	1969	1	2
John H. Bates	1961–1962, 1964	1961	18	1
Hurtle G. Bath	1941	1941	2	
Murrie A. Batt	1978	1978	13	7
Ronald W. Batt	1948–1952, 1954	1948	56	22
Clement H. Bayley	1920, 1922–1925	1920	39	51
Francis H. Bayley	1900	1901	27	7
John A. Bayley	1901	1901	1	
Edward M. Beare	1906–1909	1906	37	
Reginald J. Beaufoy	1963–1968	1963	80	62
Gordon H. Beck	1921	1921	10	1
Lindsay Beck	1921–1922	1921	29	26
Harold A. Beer	1931	1931	9	
Charles M. Begg	1889	1889	2	
Bryan Beinke	1993, 1995–1996, 1998–2003	1996	107	169
Alfred H. Bell			5	
John J. Belton	1987–1989	1987	8	10
Paul J. Belton	1976–1985	1976	181	171
John P. Bennet	1937–1938	1937	33	
Kevin J. Beswick	1970–1981	1970	66	
Stanley C. Bettison	1911–1913	1911	14	
Reginald J. Betts	1929–1930	1929	21	11
James Biglands	1898	1898	6	
Arthur C. Bilsborow	1924–1925	1924	20	2
Colin Black	1973	1973	1	
Daryl J. Black	1968	1968	5	
Allan R. Blagrove	1955–1959	1955	63	1
Geoffrey Blethyn	1977	1977	11	13
John R. Bodycombe	1884	1884		
John M. Bond	1961	1961	4	1
Shane Bond	1993, 2000–2001	1993	9	9
Troy Bond	1991–1993, 1997–2000	1991	59	54
William Irving Boon	1913–1915	1913	40	
Darryl Borlase	1985–1998	1985	246	328
Robert W. Boston	1973–1974	1973	16	12
David J. Bower	1922	1922	10	
David Boyd	1948–1960	1948	222	183
Gregory J. Boyd	1979–1982, 1985–1990	1979	172	110
Russell J. Boyd	1982–1983, 1985–1987, 1989–1992	1982	87	62
Craig Bradley	1981–1985	1981	98	105
Ian Bradmore	1978–1981	1978	40	6
W. Brain	1958	1958	1	
Phillip R. Bramley	1938	1938	7	
Richard W. Bray	1959, 1962–1966	1959	77	65
Ernest J. Bridgman			4	
Wayne R. Broadbridge	1966–1973	1966	117	62
George L. Brock	1937, 1939–1940	1937	24	
Michael J. Broderick	1974–1975	1974	18	1
Peter J. Broderick	1975–1976, 1979	1975	6	7
Paul Broderick				
Alfred E. Brooks	1884	1884	19	4
Patrick Brosnan	1992	1992	6	5
Albert J. Brown	1932–1935	1932	37	22
David Brown	1987–1996, 1998–2001	1987	182	156
James N. Brown	1941	1941	2	
William G. Brown	1958	1958	1	
Robert G. Buchan	1881	1881	3	
William F. Buchan	1884	1884	30	
Nathan Buckley	1991–1992	1991	36	44
J. Budgeman		1941	4	
George T. D. Buller	1903	1903	3	
Brian Bunce	1949	1949	8	
Howard S. A. Bungey	1923–1924	1923	29	
Haydn Bunton Sr	1945	1945	16	30
Peter Burgoyne Jnr		1996	30	28
Peter Burgoyne Snr	1977	1977	2	3
Patrick J. Burness	1948	1948	2	
Ronald P. Burns				
Julian A. Burton	1991–2003	1991	46	4
Rodney W. Burton	1971–1978	1971	65	29
Alfred M. Bushby	1887	1887	85	33
Robert W. Byers	1941	1941,	4	
Darrell Cahill	1969–1982	1969	263	375
John Cahill	1958–1973	1958, round 5	264	286
George Cairns	1884	1884	28	3
James O. J. Callier	1929–1931	1929	18	2
Edward J. Callinan	1910–1912	1910	40	23
Donaldd A. Cameron	1919	1919	1	
Peter Campbell	1963	1963	1	
Maxwell G. Carmichael	1938–1941	1938	49	
C. Carr	1902	1902		
G. Carr	1902	1902		
Raymond D. Carr	1948–1951	1948	57	15
Stephen J. Carter	1991–2003	1991	172	43
Alfred Causby	1915	1915	1	
Bruce Causby	1915	1915	12	
William H. Cavanagh	1908	1908		
Albert B. Challinder	1897	1897		4
Brett Chalmers	1991–2000	1991	120	47
Telford M. Chambers	1954	1954	4	
Arnold J. Channon	1915	1915	1	
Peter A. Chant	1961–1962	1961	10	3
Albert R. V. Chaplin	1913–1914	1913	25	35
George W. F. Chapman	1928–1930	1928	28	1
David W. Cheetham	1965–1968	1965	12	9
Robert Chervatin	1966	1966	1	
Clarence J. Christensen	1947	1947	1	
Darryl Chynoweth	1988	1988	7	5
Desmond Clark	1923	1923	2	
Noel E. G. Clark	1944–1945, 1948, 1951–1952	1944	49	45
Kym L. Clarke	1972	1972	1	
Bob Clayton	1966–1975	1966	151	4
Stephen Clifford	1978–1986	1978	162	174
Roger Clift	1948–1957	1948	155	66
Craig S. Clohessy	1980	1980	2	0
John A. Cock	1906–1910	1906	26	
Jason M. Cockatoo	1994	1994	3	1
Che Cockatoo-Collins	1993	1993	25	
Clifford T. Cocks	1907–1914	1907	75	
Stanley G. Cocks	1906–1907	1906	8	
Robert J. Coffen	1925–1927	1925	42	13
Michael J. Coffey	1884–1886	1884	82	12
Brian P. Coldwell	1953–1958	1953	53	67
Henry J. Coldwell	1926–1928	1926	40	44
Brenton J. Cole	1981–1985	1981	28	9
Angelo Congear	1908–1922	1908	160	222
Reginald Conole	1926–1929	1926	61	44
Graham A. Cooper	1961–1967	1961	118	3
Malcolm Cooper	1954–1955	1954	5	
John Coppin	1941	1941	8	
Arthur J. Cornell	1928	1928	9	1
John H. Cornish	1923–1925	1923	15	4
Richard E. K. Correll	1890	1890	39	
Lewis T. Corston	1896–1908	1896	152	
Vincent Covacevich	1892–1896	1892	58	
J. Cox	1890	1890		2
Benjamin P. Cranage	1996	1996	1	1
Peter Crerar	1989, 1991	1989	9	
Shane Crothers	1996–1997	1996	15	
John I. Crouch	1972–1977	1972	10	2
Patrick L. Crowley	1909, 1913	1909	5	1
Brian Cunningham	1971–1983	1971	256	428
Don M. Cunningham	1953–1955	1953	6	
Christopher Curcio	1996	1996	1	
Frederick C. Curnow	1910–1911	1910	6	
Joseph W. Curtin	1931	1931	4	
Ross G. Curtis	1946	1946	2	
Kym Curtis	1977–1983	1977	64	42
Stephen Curtis	1983–1988	1983	125	44
William J. Curtis	1931	1931	3	
Christopher R. Dalkin	1987	1987	8	8
Ivor R. Dangerfield	1938–1943, 1945–1946	1938	64	18
Roy F. Dangerfield	1938–1940	1938	41	44
Anthony Darcy	1995	1995	19	17
Lindsay G. Darling	1942, 1944–1946, 1948	1942	35	
John Davies	1902–1909	1902	3	10
Rod N. Davies	1972–1974	1972	24	2
George Davis	1890	1890	27	7
Henry Davis	1909	1909	12	
Len Davis	1947	1947	6	
N. Davis	1901	1901	2	
W. Davis	1901	1901		
Ralph Dawe	1936–1938, 1940	1936	10	5
Mark Dawson	1979	1979	19	25
Richard Dawson	1948	1948	3	
Clarence L. Dayman	1941–1942, 1944–1950	1941	111	
Clement Dayman	1921–1925	1921	69	71
Leslie Dayman	1921–1931, 1937	1921	166	401
Roger Delaney	1984, 1986–1989, 1991–1997	1984	208	13
George Dempster	1904–1912	1904	78	
William F. Dempster	1904–1906	1904	10	
Jack Dermody	1932–1938	1932	108	10
Ricky Dermody	1938	1938	2	
Frederick E. Dewar	1919–1927	1919	90	51
Henry B. Dewar	1908–1911	1908	26	5
John E. Dewhirst	1957–1958	1957	13	1
James S. Dickson	1906–1913	1906	54	38
Colin H. Dinning	1948–1949, 1953	1948	24	2
Ian Dinning	1948	1948	1	
Alan N. Dittmar	1951	1951	1	2
Mark A. Dittmar	1992	1992	6	1
Michael D. Dittmar	1969–1970	1969	26	65
Wallace Dittmar	1952–	1952	79	
Brian G. Dodson	1945–1946, 1949	1945	15	
Robert G. Dolan	1979–1981	1979	38	0
Alan Dolman	1945–1946, 1948	1945	35	
Michael Donaghy	1906–1909	1906	52	
William H. Donnon	1930	1930	7	3
Donald Dorian	1941	1941	1	
James W. Doyle	1934–1938	1934	28	
Kevin R. Doyle	1957–1959, 1962	1957	17	1
Paul Draper	1969	1969	4	3
Harold Drew	1925	1925	1	
Roy Drew	1919–1920, 1922–1924	1919	34	
Desmond Drogemuller	1983–1984	1983	10	2
William R. S. Drummond	1913–1915, 1920	1913	34	28
Scott G. Duncan	1986	1986	4	
Mr Dunn	1888	1888		
John Dunn	1914–1915, 1919	1914	15	
Charles J. Dunstan			35	
Donald Durbridge	1952	1952	1	
Anthony Dutch	1983	1983	4	
H. Duthie	1912	1912	7	2
William C. Dyer	1930	1930	1	
Jason Dylan	1996–2002	1996	13	7
George A. Earle	1897	1897	32	1
Joseph V. Earle	1899–1908	1899	119	
Fred A. Easton	1911	1911	6	
Harold Eaton				
Henry F. Eaton	1911–1915	1911	58	2
Maurice H. Eaton	1935–1937	1935	20	2
Raymond P. Ebel	1996–2005	1996	5	
Craig Ebert	1981–1991	1981	111	16
Jeffrey Ebert	1972	1972	1	
Russell Ebert	1968–1978, 1980–1985	1968	391	295
Ivan B. Eckermann	1974–1975, 1977–1983	1974	150	13
Arnold V. I. Echold	1919	1919	2	
John R. Ede	1969–1976	1969	113	4
Murray F. Ede	1932, 1935	1932	7	
Drozena Eden	1929–1936	1929	73	15
John A. Eden	1928–1929	1928	2	2
Bert Edwards	1941	1941	10	
Russell Edwards	1985	1985	7	
Kevin Egan	1970	1970	15	1
Nicholas Egan				
Graeme H. Eime	1961–1962, 1964	1961	21	
Ronald A. Eime	1931	1931	1	
Robert K. Elix	1965–1966, 1968–1969	1965	38	
Ronald Elleway	1961–1971	1961	204	
Glenn Elliott	1980	1980	1	
Robert L. Enright	1976–1978	1976	17	4
Dennis F. Errey	1963–1972	1963	176	15
Michael D. Errey	1981–1982, 1985, 1987	1981	26	5
John L. Evans	1975, 1977–1978	1975	11	13
Russell B. Evans	1984–1986	1984	21	13
Tim Evans	1975–1986	1975	248	1044
Rudolph Ewers	1890–	1890	31	
Robert E. Fabian	1955–1965	1955	147	3
Peter Fabian	1961	1961	1	
Milan Faletic	1971–1983	1971	78	106
James G. Farr	1950	1950	14	5
John W. Faulkead	1945	1945	14	
Wesley Fellowes	1991–1992	1991	23	7
George Fiacchi	1985–1997	1985	236	53
Edward F. Fidock	1948	1948	3	
Nigel Fiegert	1996–2004	1996	168	36
Dennis Fitzgerald	1925–1927	1925	21	20
J. Fitzpatrick	1882	1882	9	
Donald J. Fletcher	1943–1953	1943	149	33
Harry Fletcher	1878	1878	80	
Peter G. Fletcher	1967–1969	1967	31	4
William Fletcher	1870–1881	1870	79	
William Fletcher	1911	1911	2	
Edward J. Foggo	1920	1920	4	1
Glenn S. Forbes	1986	1986	1	
Henry Ford	1873	1873	17	
J. Ford			2	
John H. Ford	1919–1924	1919	73	
Alfred Formby			2	
Edward L. Formby	1898	1898	2	
John Formby			3	
Darren J. Foster	1986	1986	5	6
Richard Foster	1988–1995	1988	145	32
Carl A. Fragomeni	1973–1979	1973	128	4
Fabian Francis	1995–1997	1995	33	32
Ian Francis	1994	1994	1	1
Arthur G. Franklin	1941–1945	1941	57	31
Frans E. Fransson	1932–1933	1932	4	
Allan A. T. Fraser	1901	1901	3	
Robert W. Fraser	1898–1907	1898	108	
Nathaniel Frayne	1880-1883	1880	29	
Eric Freeman	1964–1971	1964	115	527
Charlie Fry	1886–1890	1886	96	40
James Fry	1884	1884	73	6
Jack C. Fullwood	1941	1941	10	
Michael Gaffney	1992–1994	1992	17	8
Frederick G. L. Galliford	1923–1930	1923	86	97
Percy G. Gardner	1890	1890		1
Thomas E. Garland	1952–1958	1952	136	86
Allan F. Garrick	1945	1945	1	
Henry J. Gates	1941–1942, 1947–1948, 1950	1941	50	
Laurence Gates	1946, 1948–1950	1946	29	11
Jeffrey M. Gerlach	1967–1969	1967	34	6
Randall G. Gerlach	1971–1977	1971	110	
Geoffrey W. Germain	1947	1947	1	
Francis J. Gibaut	1925–1927	1925	12	
Francis J. Gilbert	1928, 1930, 1932–1933	1928	26	
Anthony Giles	1975–1984	1975	190	12
Alan J. Gill	1978–1979, 1981–1985	1978	87	65
David S. Gill	1957–1960, 1962–1967	1957	145	101
Graham J. Gill	1964–1965, 1967	1964	14	3
Tim Ginever	1983–1997	1983	314	302
T. Goode	1884	1884	21	
Archibald J. Gosling	1900–1905	1900	75	
Bradley Gotch	1985	1985	11	25
Stuart Gould	1930	1930	1	
Arthur Gower	1942	1942	9	
G. Gower	1947	1947	2	
Dave Granger	1975–1982	1975	103	92
Colin S. Grant	1947	1947	2	
Harry Graves				
James Graves	1897	1897	82	
Lennard F. Graves	1923, 1929–1931	1923,	37	
Harry G. Green	1908	1908	3	
Claude Greening	1939–1941, 1946	1939	47	
Allen S. Greer	1946–1956	1946	173	2
Donald M. Gregg	1950	1950	6	
Trevor P. Grenfell	1985	1985	2	3
Albert C. Griffiths	1941	1941	3	
Ashley Griffiths				
Frank H. Griffiths	1949	1949	5	
J. A. Griffiths	1941	1941	1	
Wayne F. Griffiths	1967–1968	1967	4	
Colin Grimm	1945	1945	16	
Rodney Grimm	1969, 1973	1969	7	6
Shane Grimm	1990–1993	1990	27	21
Trevor Grimwood	1971–1979	1971	33	30
Britt D. Grocke	1994–1995	1994	2	
Darryl I. Growden	1985–1986	1985	9	7
Kevin W. Growden	1945–1954	1945	126	61
Lionel W. Hagan	1934–1936	1934	8	
James W. Haines	1973	1973	9	1
George P. Hall	1900	1900	4	
John F. Hall	1941	1941	1	
John F. Hall	1951–1955	1951	28	44
Richard F. Hall	1947–1949	1947	12	1
Ronald Hall	1944–1949	1944	49	
William J. Halliday	1927–1928	1927	11	
Michael D. Hamill	1980–1981	1980	15	3
Ernest M. Hamilton	1887-1892	1887	71	50
R. Hanley	1890	1890	12	
Donald M. Hannaford	1959–1961	1959	36	
Ian G. Hannaford	1958–1964	1958	123	108
Victor Hannam	1937–1938	1937	6	
Anthony B. Hannan	1977–1980	1977	40	3
Francis Hansen	1910–1914	1910	58	163
Henry L. Hanson	1897	1897	3	1
William G. T. Hanson	1935	1935	8	
Benedict Harris	1982–1986, 1990–1992	1982	119	21
Fredrick C. P. Harrison	1923	1923	8	4
Phillip Harrison	1984–1989	1984	133	84
David A. Harvey	1984–1988	1984	34	1
James Harvey	1945	1945	2	
John T. Harvey	1982–1988	1982	105	21
Ross W. Haslam	1966–1971	1966	113	108
Wayne J. Hastings	1963–1966	1963	9	
Neil Hawke	1957	1957	5	27
Mervyn W. Hay	1936–1937	1936	24	20
Neville Hayes	1953–1965	1953	217	58
Raymond J. Hayes	1972–1974	1972	55	
John T. Hayman	1915	1915	3	7
G. Hazel	1898	1898	2	
Matthew Healy	1900–1903	1900	48	64
John Heath	1936–1939	1936	25	1
John W. D. Heaton	1941	1941	1	
Stanley G. Hemson	1905–1906	1905	25	
Allen Hender	1928–1933	1928	91	44
Ned Hender	1931–1940	1931	166	219
Rodney C. Hendry	1962	1962	2	
Mr Henley	1890	1890		2
Murray E. Henningsen	1951	1951	4	10
Colin M. Herbert	1945	1945	2	
John J. Hermanson	1970	1970	2	
Mr Herrott	1883	1883	5	1
Charles E. Heslop	1886	1886		
Malcolm T. Hewitson	1948–1951, 1955–1956	1948	72	9
Harry Hewitt				
John S. Hickman	1939–1940	1939	6	
Peter Hill	1956	1956	1	
Horace E. Hoare	1919, 1924	1919	8	7
William Hoare	1901	1901	9	
Stanley J. Hobbs	1948–1950	1948	47	18
Anthony D. Hobby	1972–1974	1972	26	11
Lawrence C. Hodge	1922–1930	1922	90	9
Jeffrey J. Hodges	1967	1967	4	
Scott Hodges	1987–1990, 1992–1998	1987	183	684
Arthur A. Hoffmann	1923–1927	1923	41	24
Ronald W. Hoffmann	1939–1948	1939	69	16
Peter H. Hofner	1978–1982	1978	94	22
Sydney W. Hogben	1919–1920	1919	12	3
Albert E. Hollingworth	1935–1940	1935	91	193
Mark W. Holman	1975	1975	1	
Brian V. Holmes	1964–1967	1964	79	1
John C. Hooper	1931–1934	1931	52	41
Thomas Horan	1882	1882	9	
Maxwell G. R. Horne	1945	1945	11	
Andrew J. Hosie	1922–1924	1922	13	18
Archibald Hosie	1890–1904	1890	183	
Robert Hosie	1882–1886	1882	63	6
Sampson Hosking	1907–1936	1907	160	41
T. J. Howe	1930	1930	1	
Samuel W. Howie	1913–1923	1913	48	5
Alex Hryhorec	1974	1974	3	
R. Hubbert	1947	1947	5	
Wilfred Huddleston	1961–1963	1961	24	12
John W. Hudson	1964	1964	21	19
Danny Hughes	1981–1983, 1991–1993	1981	130	7
Ian G. Hull	1947	1947	10	
Troy Hull	1992–1994, 1996	1992	35	4
Raymond Huppatz	1982–1984	1982	38	54
David S. Hutton	1985–1995	1985	159	89
Stephen D. Hutton	1987	1987	2	
David Hynes	1985–1990	1985	120	115
Patrick J. Hynes	1973, 1975–1977	1973	35	
Gordon B. Inkster	1919	1919	1	
Keith D. Inman	1930	1930	2	
Charles M. Irvine	1953	1953	1	
Ian A. Jackman	1973–1980	1973	29	19
Frederick W. J. Jacobs	1919–1920	1919	14	
Stanley W. Jacquier	1933–1938	1933	84	14
Basil W. J. Jaggard	1952–1959	1952	94	114
Hewitson L. James	1912	1912	2	
Maxwell James	1971–1977, 1982–1984	1971	156	175
Richard James	1901–1909	1901	109	
Edley Jennings	1932	1932	4	
Keith R. Johns	1961	1961	1	
Rex Johns	1954–1963	1954	134	451
Brian Johnson	1967	1967	1	
Christopher Johnston	1935–1942	1935	122	11
Colin N. Johnson	1945, 1949	1945	5	
John A. Johnson	1931–1932	1931	10	33
Kenneth A. G. Johnson	1928–1929	1928	22	17
Robert C. Johnson	1928–1935	1928	107	
Robert R. Johnson	1969	1969	1	
William V. Johnson	1923–1931	1923	147	20
Russell Johnston	1981–1990	1981	208	73
W. Johnston	1934	1934	2	
Kenneth M. Jolly	1945–1947	1945	45	
Ernest Jones	1901–1902	1901	19	
Keith B. Jones	1931–1932	1931	18	2
Laurence S. W. Jordan	1932	1932	1	
Merrick C. Judd	1939–1940	1939	8	
Christos C. Kastanos	1966	1966	3	3
John I. Katavich	1967	1967	3	
Alfred Keal			18	
Clifford Keal	1920–1929	1920	147	90
Edward Keays	1899–1901	1899	61	
Clyde Kellaway	1940–1941, 1944	1940	21	
Stanley Kellaway	1933	1933	1	
Thomas Kellaway	1932–1934, 1936–1943, 1945	1932	126	95
Charles Kellett	1882–1885	1882	133	5
Kimball S. Kelly	1958–1960, 1963	1958	33	2
David J. Kemp	1980, 1982–1984	1980	28	3
Paul Kemp	1990–1993	1990	36	30
Archibald I. Kempster	1892	1894	49	
Harry Kempster	1890	1890	52	
Walter F. Kempster	1890	1890	92	
Arlen V. Kennedy	1985–1988	1985	61	28
Dexter R. Kennedy	1983–1984	1983	50	7
Frederick W. Kennedy	1871	1872	7	
Peter H. Keough	1951–1952	1951	19	15
Alfred Kerr	1884	1884		2
Richard B. Kerr	1884	1884	13	
Roger A. Kerr	1988	1988	24	23
Dean M. Kerrison	1986	1986	4	
Brian H. Key	1957	1957	37	
Brian H. King	1949	1949	2	
Robert Kingston	1971–1974	1971	73	62
Kym Kinnear	1973–1984, 1986	1973	272	125
Robert Kirkpatrick	1883–1884	1883	41	3
David H. Kitson	1984	1984	1	
Raymond Klavins	1970	1970	2	
Frank H. Knapman	1911–1912	1911	24	
Ronald Knight	1936–1937	1936	5	
Steven J. Knight	1984–1986	1984	41	66
Joezef A. Kozlowski	1974–1977	1974	19	17
Kym S. Kretschmer	1977	1977	5	
Lyall R. Kretschmer	1945–1947	1945	29	
Marx A. Kretschmer	1951–1960	1951	143	28
Harold Kuhl	1922–1923	1922	3	1
Jaroslav R. Kurovec	1972–1973	1972	3	
Len L. Lackman	1915, 1919	1915	20	40
Graham R. Ladner	1962–1964	1962	18	1
David W. Laing	1960–1961	1960	3	1
Robert Lander	1934, 1936	1934	7	1
Damian Lang	1996–1997	1996	7	2
Basil Langmead	1924	1924	9	6
P. J. Lashmar	1902–1903	1902	21	
Clarence A. Latimer	1923–1926	1923	41	38
Dale J. Laube	1986–1987	1986	12	10
Mark Lawson	1985–1986	1985	36	15
Shane Lawson	1986, 1988–1989	1986	3	
Alec Leleu	1890	1890	83	2
Frank Leleu			28	
Frederick Leleu			19	
William Leleu			1	
Gregory R. Leal	1967–1970	1967	58	69
Ronald H. R. Leaver	1951–1954	1951	35	34
Adam G. Lees	1896	1896	90	45
Brian A. Lees	1950	1950	7	1
Alfred Roy Le Messurier	1870	1870		5
Alfred Le Messurier			37	
E. M. Le Messurier			6	
Ernest E. Le Messurier	1870–1883	1870	90	12
Edward Le Messurier			46	
Peter Le Messurier	1880	1880		
Roy A. Le Messurier	1907	1907	11	
Martin Leslie	1981–1988	1981	150	21
Lawrence H. Levy	1920	1920	4	3
Brian Leys	1995–1996, 1998–1999, 2002	1995	86	9
Bruce Light	1967–1978	1967	216	89
Allen Limb	1912	1912	3	
Cuthbert H. B. Lincoln	1914–1915, 1919–1920, 1922	1914	34	4
T. Lindsay			2	
George Linklater	1896, 1913	1896	107	
Harry Linklater	1904	1904	6	
John J. Lloyd	1921–1922	1921	13	6
Harold Logan	1925–1934	1925	115	265
John Londrigan	1912–1914	1912	44	
Ernest A. Loveder	1923–1925	1923	22	
Maurice H. Lowe	1889–1890	1889	77	
Brian T. Luke	1958–1964	1958	95	77
John E. Luke	1954	1954	2	
Ronald F. Luke	1950–1954	1950	46	29
Craig Lum	1984–1989	1984	47	8
Brayden Lyle	1993, 2001–2002	1993	68	10
Jack Mack	1900–1905, 1907–1909	1900	114	
Kenwick M. Maddern	1924–1926	1924	24	33
Francis J. C. Magor	1909–1915	1909	87	50
William G. Mahney	1958–1961	1958	23	5
Wayne Mahney	1984–1991	1984	108	92
William Mahoney	1912	1912	10	7
Spiro Malakellis	1995–1997	1995	17	9
Tony Malakellis	1994–1998	1994	70	81
Stanley Malin	1899–1900	1899	26	
Louis Mangan	1945	1945	10	
Rex N. Mann	1946–1947	1946	25	
Richard F. Manouge	1982	1982	7	4
Walter G. Manson	1908–1912	1908	34	
Arthur R. Marrett	1956, 1958–1964	1956	119	76
Murray Marrett	1978	1978	2	3
Paul J. Marrett	1969–1977	1969	139	105
Peter L. Marrett	1947–1953, 1955	1947	127	76
William C. Marshall	1922	1922	4	
William A. Martiensen	1919	1919	2	
Anthony Martyn	1981	1981	15	13
Louis W. Martyn	1937–1944	1937	52	
Ernest J. Mason	1909–1910	1909	28	
John F. W. Mathison	1904–1909	1904	62	128
Graham C. Matters	1962–1965	1962	52	67
Richard Matthews	1884	1884		
Trevor May	1994	1994	10	16
Mr Maynard	1897	1897		
Alan J. Maynard	1913–1915	1913	34	2
Alan W. Maynard	1969–1973	1969	17	10
Rupert Maynard	1939–1940, 1946	1939	15	
Richard Mayne	1922–1924	1922	27	11
Clarence T. Maywald	1919–1931	1919	145	2
John D. McBain	1958–1962	1958	56	24
Graham McCarthy	1957	1957	3	
Harold McDonald	1949–1958	1949	140	9
Thomas W. McDonald	1923–1925	1923	40	1
Arthur McDonnell	1911	1911	4	
Stephen McDougall	1988	1988	1	
Harold G. McEwen	1909–1913	1909	64	
Thomas A. H. McFarlane	1909–1915, 1919	1909	100	28
John F. McFarlane	1934	1934	1	
William McFarlane	1941–1948	1941	102	
Lindsay W. McGie	1970–1972	1970	27	2
Barry McGowan	1964	1964	5	
Phil McGuinness	1991–2002	1991	134	177
James McInerney	1930–1931	1930	32	25
Bruce L. McInnes	1924–1925, 1927	1924	30	5
Norman W. J. McInnes	1927–1928	1927	10	2
Mr McIntyre	1884	1884		
Ashley W. McKay	1964–1968	1964	77	28
Darren A. McKay	1990–1998	1990	85	46
Alexander M. McKenzie	1892	1892	108	163
Colin A. McKenzie	1944, 1946, 1948–1949	1944	16	
E. McKenzie	1899	1899		
Graham McKenzie	1965	1965	9	
John McKenzie	1890	1890	180	91
Kennith McKenzie	1883–1898	1883	186	
Malcolm E. McKiggan	1934	1934	1	
Bob McLean	1939–1948	1939	147	414
Leslie A. G. McLean	1940–1949	1940	116	
Andrew McLeod	1994–1996	1994	23	35
Trevor McLeod	1974–1975	1974	36	
Duncan McNaughton			14	
Darren Mead	1989–1996, 2002	1989	127	20
Peter K. Mead	1963–1967	1963	55	19
Frederick A. Meadows	1911	1911	14	13
Robert M. Meers	1935–1941	1935	117	
Alf Meyers	1880	1880		
Mr Middleton	1884	1884		
George W. Middleton	1870–1879	1870	17	
John E. Middleton	1910	1910	12	
Joseph Middleton	1913–1914	1913	19	
Alfred G. Miers	1891–1890	1891	150	
Leon C. Milde	1968–1976	1968	119	98
Albert Miller	1890	1890	25	
J. Miller	1938–1941	1938	13	
Harold C. Mills	1946–1950	1946	55	36
Percival R. A. Mills	1942, 1946	1942	16	
Maurie Minervini	1952	1952	1	
Albert C. Mitchell	1889-1893	1889	11	
Ernest E. Mitchell	1882-1885	1882	18	
Richard Monoghan	1989	1989	1	
Brian D. Moore	1947–1950	1947	20	1
C. Moore			5	
Colin W. Moore	1965–1969	1965	57	15
George Moore	1904	1904	12	
William D. Morton	1893–1896	1893		
Geof Motley	1953–1966	1953	258	156
Algernon J. K. Mott	1926–1933	1926	105	2
Ernest Mucklow	1920–1923, 1926–1935	1920	183	
James Munro	1882	1882	39	
Thomas P. Munyard	1899	1899	80	
George Murphy	1934–1936	1934	8	16
George A. Murray	1952–1954	1952	4	
Walter Murray	1893	1893	52	
Christopher Natt	1972–1983	1972	216	85
Gregory C. Natt	1978–1981	1978	31	1
Mervyn F. Natt	1945	1945	6	
George T. Neaylon	1929–1930	1929	3	
Roger N. Nettle	1965	1965	2	1
T. Newman	1873–1877	1873	3	
Eric M. Nicholls	1947–1949	1947	37	6
Kenneth Nickels	1972	1972	4	
Harry Ninham	1894	1894	20	
John Noel	1870–1884	1870	81	
Howard J. Norman	1904	1904		
Thomas Nosworthy	1884	1884	24	
Colin J. Northcott	1972–1975	1972	24	37
Paul Northeast	1987, 1989–2000	1987	235	11
Bruce T. Nyland	1962–1972	1962	165	44
Edward J. Oatey	1921	1921	2	
Lionel O'Brien	1948	1948	2	
Michael S. O'Brien	1985–1987	1985	66	79
Stephen T. O'Brien	1973–1975	1973	56	
Andrew Obst	1987–1989, 1998–1999	1987	90	50
Ken Obst	1933–1943	1933	165	
Peter Obst	1955–1964, 1968	1955	171	167
Trevor Obst	1959–1972	1959	200	49
Maxwell G. O'Connell	1958–1959	1958	4	4
David J. O'Donovan	1984	1984	1	
John Oehme	1933, 1935–1936	1933	22	
Phillip M. O'Grady	1910–1913	1910	43	28
Albert Y. Olds	1919–1922	1919	52	
Harold Oliver	1910–1915, 1919–1922	1910	117	89+
Troy Olsen	1994–1995	1994	37	52
Ernest O'Regan	1929–1930, 1932	1929	34	13
Stephen J. Oswald	1984	1984	2	
Brenton W. Owens	1984–1986, 1988–1989	1984	41	3
William G. Owens	1941	1941	9	
Colin S. Parham	1948–1957	1948	115	
Edward Parks	1890	1890		
Joseph Parks			13	
Max Peake	1948	1948	7	
Pat Pedersen	1946–1947	1946	17	
Simon T. Pedler	1994–1999	1994	65	32
Alexander Pender	1946–1947	1946	18	
Harold C. Penn	1925, 1927	1925	13	
Harry Perry	1940	1940,	1	
William Perry	1936	1936	1	
Frederick Peters	1940	1940	9	
Mr Peters			2	
Jack Henry Pettrey	1937–1938	1937	11	
Geoffrey R. Phelps	1986–1990	1986	115	
Greg Phillips	1976–1982, 1987–1993	1976	343	93
Harold Phillips	1885–1900	1885	198	125
Neville W. Phillips	1976–1977, 1979	1976	26	
Robert D. Philp	1958, 1961–1966, 1968	1958	133	118
Percy G. Philp	1934	1934	4	
Henry N. Philps	1904	1904	7	
Barry Pilgrim	1966–1967	1966	27	19
Charles Pleass			28	
George Pleass	1884	1884		
James Pocock	1898	1898	3	
Gregory Pollard	1941	1941	1	
Darryl Poole	1991–2003	1991	86	29
Horace V. Pope	1905–1915, 1919–1920	1905	156	46
Andrew L. Porplycia	1974–1983	1974	163	148
Jeff Potter	1959–1970	1970	235	289
Ronald W. Powell	1955–1958, 1960	1955	10	3
William J. Powell	1939	1939	2	
Jack Prideaux				
James Prideaux	1933–1936	1933	63	276
Thomas Prideaux	1870–1880	1870	70	
W. Prideaux			17	
Danny A. Pritchard	1967–1970	1967	35	21
David E. Pritchard	1915, 1919	1915,	3	5
Richard J. Proctor	1944–1945, 1948	1944	13	
H. Quin			4	
Hugh R. Quin	1933–1937	1933	18	
George U. Quinn	1940	1940	6	
James G. Quinn	1901	1901	13	
John Quinn, Sr.	1900–1908	1900	116	85
John A. Quinn	1967	1967	1	
John M. Quinn	1929, 1932–1934	1929	11	
Robert B. Quinn	1933–1944	1933, round 2	239	386
Robert G. Quinn	1967	1967	1	
Thomas Quinn	1928–1930	1928	59	
William S. Quinn	1915, 1919	1915	6	
Jeffrey Rainsford	1967	1967	1	
Robert Rankin	1963	1963	6	
John A. Rann	1870–1878	1870	39	
Richard J. Rann	1870–1877	1870	17	
Allan Rathjen	1948	1948	2	
Edward Raven	1880–1884	1880	57	
Horrace Reddaway				
Lynton Reeves	1963	1963	3	
Augustus R. Reinberg	1931, 1933	1931	10	
William Renfrey	1890	1890	56	
Allan Reval	1932–1945	1932	187	79
W. J. Richards	1932	1932	7	
John F. Ritch	1932–1934, 1936–1937	1932	38	24
Paul Rizonico	1989–1994	1989	102	22
Lew Roberts	1937–1948	1937	179	50
Alexander Robertson	1922	1922	12	8
Colin Robertson				
Graeme L. Robertson	1982–1984	1982	25	
Herbert Robertson	1933	1933	4	
John W. Robertson	1912–1915, 1919–1920	1912	62	
Philip A. Robertson	1981–1984	1981	26	30
Stanley Robertson	1920–1921	1920	16	6
Mr Robinson	1884	1884		
Bertram Robinson	1926	1926	7	
John W. Robinson	1954–1956	1954	42	
Raymond Robinson	1921	1921	1	
Edward Rose	1912	1912	1	
Herman F. Rose	1909–1912	1909	55	
Trevor J. Rose	1962–1963	1962	3	
Stephen D. Ross	1989	1989	3	
Percival Rowan	1911	1911		
Robert C. Roy	1883–1884	1883	42	
Donald A. Rudd	1935	1935	2	
Lloyd Rudd	1935–1940	1935	77	
Dick Russell	1947–1953	1947	121	1
Dwayne Russell	1981–1986	1981	71	133
Damien Ryan	1993–1995	1993	27	13
Harry Ryan	1897	1897	2	
Jack Ryan			35	
Henry Sadler	1884	1884	13	
Charles G. Sainsbury	1897–1902	1987	55	
Kevin J. Salmon	1960–1971	1960	166	49
Kevin J. Salvemini	1951–1953	1951	35	12
Leonard Salvemini	1930	1930	6	2
Colin L. Sampson	1949	1949	9	5
Richard H. Samuel	1908	1908	4	
John J. Samuel	1897–1901	1897	84	
John H. Sandilands	1881	1881		
Robert C. Sandiland	1875–1882	1875		
Alexander H. Sangster	1910	1910	3	
Thomas Sard	1915	1915	2	
Ben Sawford				
James W. Sawford	1953, 1955–1957	1953	54	86
John F. Sawford	1902	1902	4	
H. Sayers	1880	1880		
Bernard J. Schroeder	1969	1969	1	
Shane Schulz	1978–1979	1978	4	
Reginald Schumann	1939–1941, 1946–1950	1939	116	0
Louis Schupelius	1936–1937	1936	6	
Albert Schwann	1889–1896	1889	29	
Henry L. Selby	1904–1908	1904	26	
Zane Separovich	1977–1978	1977	4	3
Victor E. Serotski	1945–1946, 1950	1945	23	
Adrian J. Settre	1988–1998	1988	121	105
William Shard			2	
Kenneth J. Shannon	1955	1955	6	1
A. Shearer	1897	1897	48	
Charles Shearer	1922–1923	1922	10	1
Damien L. Sheehan	1992, 1995–2001	1992	20	7
Justin Sheehan	1995	1995	1	1
Don I. Shepherd	1941	1941	1	
John Sidoli	1870-1891	1870	118	
Jon C. Simpson	1980–1988	1980	61	35
John Skelley	1938–1946, 1949	1938	103	72
Fidel Skorzewski	1970	1970	2	
Kenneth L. Slade	1921–1922	1921	22	8
George R. Slatter	1882	1882	24	8
Garry Smallridge	1991–1992	1991	37	27
Darren Smith	1984–1996	1984	343	456
Harry Smith Jnr	1882–1884	1882	55	
Rohan Smith	1985–1990, 1992–1997	1985	251	247
Thomas G. Smith	1870–1881	1870	69	
A. Snell	1941	1941	2	
Harold S. Soar	1905–1909	1905	48	
Anthony Sorrell				
Tony Sorrell				
Trevor Sorrell	1970–1981	1970	235	219
Scott Spalding	1994	1994	25	10
Henry Sparnon	1873–1877	1873	14	
Keith L. Spencer	1964–1973	1964	161	50
Paul A. Spencer	1979	1979	1	
Tom Spender	1933	1933	1	
Douglas B. Spiers	1964–1968	1964	69	23
John Spry	1977–1979	1977	52	8
John Stapleton	1939	1939	1	
William B. Stark	1894-1899	1894	51	13
Alfred P. Steed	1996–1998	1996	59	
Henry Stephens	1890	1890	100	
Peter Stephens	1976	1976	14	10
Thomas Stephens	1887-1893	1887		
G. Stevens			8	
H. Stevens				
Laurence A. Stevens	1952, 1954–1958	1952	74	
Lindsay Stevens	1890	1890		
Alan Stewart				
Stedman C. L. Stidson	1910	1910	4	
Albert E. Stone	1915	1915	3	
Frederick Stone	1870–1877	1870	11	
Leonard W. Stone	1953	1953	1	
Mr Strauss	1901	1901		
Edward Strawns	1899–1909	1899	125	
Paul J. Stringer	1987–1991	1987	32	7
Francis H. Stuart	1961	1961	1	
Noel Stuart	1974	1974	3	
John C. E. Swanson	1934–1935	1934	10	
Graham Sweeney	1967–1969	1967	33	5
James Sweeney	1941	1941	12	
Irvine R. Syms	1926	1926	1	
Kenneth W. Tainsh	1927	1927	1	
Sydney Tait			2	
William Tait	1870–1878	1870	18	
James Talbot	1945	1945	6	
Trevor Talbot	1978	1978	3	
Peter Talman	1965–1966	1965	11	5
John M. Tapp	1946–1948	1946	32	
Albert A. Tapping	1913	1913	10	
Michael S. Tate	1979	1979	5	
John T. Taylor Snr	1915–1923	1915	61	
Patrick J. Taylor	1973–1974	1973	51	38
Percy W. Taylor	1921–1922	1912	14	
Victor Taylor	1941, 1944, 1947	1941	3	
Gordon W. Temby	1926–1928	1926	12	
Harold W. Terrell	1930–1933	1930	59	
Norman W. Terrell	1928–1931	1928	36	
William H. Theodore	1919	1919	4	6
Neville W. Thiele	1965, 1967–1973	1965	96	4
J. Thomas	1915	1915	1	
Thomas Thomas	1897–1900	1897	64	
William B. Thomas	1956–1958	1956	18	17
Claude V. Thompson	1930–1934	1930	31	5
Donald L. Thompson	1955–1962	1955	121	35
John D. Thompson	1948, 1950–1951	1948	17	
Trevor B. Thompson	1961, 1963	1961	10	2
Christian Thomson	1991	1991	3	
Wilfred Thurgarland	1913	1913	2	
Kenneth F. Tierney	1954–1963	1954	160	
Noel H. B. Tobin	1915, 1919	1915	4	
Albert E. P. Tomlin	1890	1890	98	
Harbor W. Tompins	1900–1901			
Henry T. Tompkins	1897-1901	1897	25	
James J. Tompkins	1895–1908	1895	147	151
Nicholas Tonkin	1887	1887	2	
Steven K. Traynor	1961–1967	1961	121	163
Gary Tredrea	1973–1976, 1978–1979	1973	71	
Warren Tredrea	1996–1997, 2007	1996	26	33
Simon Tregenza	1988–2000	1988	107	67
William J. Trigg	1936	1936	3	
Dean J. Trowse	1951–1957	1951	105	64
Arthur H. Tubell	1919–1920	1919	6	5
Norman F. Tull	1959–1960	1959	37	34
Mr. Tullagh			19	
Thomas Tulloch	1870–1880	1870	51	
Kevin J. Tully	1969	1969	2	
Arthur J. Tunbridge	1934	1934	5	
Maurice C. Tuohy	1913	1913	5	
James Turnbull	1884	1884		
Stuart Turnbull	1884	1884	43	
Tom Turnbull	1882-1886	1882		
Arthur E. Turner	1908–1910	1908	18	
Dick Turpenny	1880-1885	1880	50	5
Mark Tylor	1985–1995, 1997	1985	161	285
Walter J. Tymko	1965	1965	2	
Graham Tyrrell	1969	1969	4	
Samuel Tyzack	1870–1881	1870	63	
Reginald V. Underwood	1935–1936	1935	3	
Alonzo Utting	1926–1927, 1930–1932	1926	41	16
R. Verco	1898	1898		
Ian A. Verrier	1975–1978	1975	65	13
Graham Virgo	1960, 1962–1963	1960	34	
John Wade	1927–1929	1927	65	
Mark A. Wade	1989–1995, 1998–2003	1991,	38	2
Michael Wade		1991		
Mr Wade			7	
Steve Wade	1927–1928	1927	14	5
Alex Wait	1882	1882		
Julian Wait	1993–2003	1993	77	38
Darryl Wakelin	1992–1994	1992	24	3
Shane Wakelin	1993	1993		
Alexander Wald	1877	1879	34	
Norman W. Waldron	1952	1952	1	
John D. Walker	1950	1950	1	
Bryan L. Walker	1955, 1958	1955	6	
Don Wallace	1900	1900		
Douglas J. Walsh	1908	1908	8	
Richard J. Walsh	1883	1887	14	
Robert A. Walsh			30	
Gavin Wanganeen	1990, 2006	1990, round 1	27	48
Harold Ware	1919	1919	3	
George Warren			7	
Len Warren	1977	1977	30	
Mr Warren				
Eugene Warrior	1995–1997, 1999–2002	1995	33	42
Mark Warton	1988–1989, 1991, 1993–1994	1988	28	
Michael J. Warton	1993–1998	1993	3	
Clive Waterhouse	1995	1995, round 1	89	208
Gordon L. Watson	1951–1952	1951	8	
Joseph C. Watson	1911, 1913–1914	1911	36	19
Kevin Watson	1969–1970	1969	6	3
Michael Watson	1979	1979	3	
Henry J. Watt	1881–1883	1881	37	
Mr Watts			2	
Ivor T. Waye	1929–1931	1929,	54	
George Webb	1890–1898	1890	170	
Frederick R. Wedd	1883	1885	11	
Edward T. Weeden	1920	1920	4	
Sydney Ween	1927–1934	1927	134	49
Jeff Weise	1943, 1945–1948	1943,	49	
Kenneth E. West	1932–1938, 1943	1932	109	
Robert West	1995, 1997	1995	32	38
Gordon Westerly	1937	1937	1	
Mr Western			3	
Robert B. Whatman	1975–1978	1975	62	111
Robert Whelan	1948	1948	1	
Ted Whelan	1949–1961	1949	248	91
Clarence A. Whicker	1936, 1938	1936	6	
Percy C. Whicker	1901–1907	1901	41	
William E. Whicker	1931–1940	1931	116	
William W. Whicker	1960	1960	2	
John C. White	1925–1927	1925	30	1
Victor White	1948–1949, 1952	1948	17	
Colin R. Whitehead	1982–1983	1982	3	4
Raymond D. Whittaker Jnr	1949–1953, 1955	1949	79	104
Raymond Whittaker Snr	1930–1934	1930	42	
Carlyle C. Wightman	1931–1938	1931	109	66
Steve F. Wildman	1991	1991	4	5
Norman Wilkins	1927–1928	1927	11	4
Joseph L. Wilkinson	1932–1937	1932	37	
Anthony Williams	1979–1985	1979	101	60
Fos Williams	1950–1958	1950, round 1	151	263
Mark Williams	1979–1980, 1990–1992	1979	115	104
Melville F. Williams	1946, 1950–1951	1946	20	12
Michael G. Williams	1983	1983	1	
Paul Williams	1988–1992	1988	28	14
Stephen Williams	1979–1986, 1988–1995	1979	268	288
Thomas Williams		1955	108	
Harry Wills	1905	1905		
Barry E. Wilson	1955–1956, 1958	1955	5	
Geoffrey Wilson	1958	1958	1	
Michael Wilson	1995–1996, 2003	1995	42	10
Leonard Wisdom	1914–1915, 1919	1914	26	4
William A. G. Wisdom	1902–1903	1902	41	
Gordon V. Woite	1941	1941	5	
Peter Woite	1969–1978	1969	182	102
Edward Woloszek	1972	1972	5	3
John Woollard	1899–1910	1899	37	7
Albert V. Woolman	1909–1910	1909	7	
Stephen J. Woolman	1910, 1915	1915	5	
Harold W. Yates	1934–1938	1934	45	35
Peter Yeo	1967–1969	1967	48	54
Stanley Young	1945	1945	1	
Lloyd Zucker	1949–1959	1949	183	259

== Foundation era players (1870–1876) ==
The Port Adelaide Football Club was established in late April or early May 1870^{[6]} as part of a joint Australian football and cricket club. The football club played its first match against a team called the "Young Australians" on 30 July 1870 at North Park Lands. Football in South Australia at this stage was yet to be organised and there were several sets of rules in use across the state.

- Club captain

Name	PA career span (Foundation)	Debut	Games	Goals
Tom. J. Bickers	1873–			
Charles H. Brown	1873–			
Walter S. Carr	1873–			
Edwin T. Ede	1873			
William Fletcher	1870–			
Harry Ford	1873			
Henry Ford				
George R. Gliddon	1870			
George H. Ireland	1870			
Alfred LeMessurier	1870			5
Ernest E. LeMessurier	1870			12
George W. Middleton	1870			
T. Newman	1873–			
John Noel	1870			6
Alfred Pickhaver	1873–			
Thomas Prideaux	1870			
John A. Rann	1870–			
Richard J. Rann	1870–			
Robert C. Sandiland	1875–			
Harry Smith	1870–			
Thomas Smith	1870–			
Henry Sparnon	1873–1877			
Fred Stone	1870			
William Tait	1870			
W Townsend	1873–			
Tom Tulloch	1870			
Samuel Tyzack	1870			
Bertie Vincent	1870			
John Wald	1870		3	2
C Wells				
Mr Williams	1873–			
