= 1977 SANFL Grand Final =

- Official match program. Pictured top are Port Adelaide's John Cahill and Russell Ebert in discussion. Inset below is Glenelg coach John Nicholls.

Port Adelaide	Glenelg
17.11 (113)	16.9 (105)
	1	2	3	4
PA	4.3 (27)	9.7 (61)	13.9 (87)	17.11 (113)
GLE	5.2 (32)	8.3 (51)	12.6 (78)	16.9 (105)
- Date: Saturday, 24 September (2:10 pm)
- Stadium: Football Park
- Attendance: 56,717
- Umpires: Peter Mead, Robin Bennet
- Coin toss won by: Port Adelaide
- Kicked toward: South End

Accolades
- Best on Ground: Brian Cunningham
- Australian Football Hall of Fame: John Nicholls (1996; Legend); Russell Ebert (1996); John Cahill (2002); Peter Carey (2009); Graham Cornes (2012); Greg Phillips (2020)

The 1977 SANFL Grand Final was an Australian rules football game contested between the Port Adelaide Football Club and the Glenelg Football Club, held at Football Park on Saturday 24 September 1977. It was the 79th annual Grand Final of the South Australian National Football League, staged to determine the premiers of the 1977 SANFL season. The match, attended by 56,717 spectators, was won by Port Adelaide by a margin of 8 points, marking that club's twenty-fourth premiership victory.

== Background ==
=== Centenary of the SANFL ===
In 1977 the SANFL celebrated its centenary, commemorating 100 years since the inaugural 1877 SAFA season. All SANFL clubs that year wore a patch commemorating the milestone.

=== Port Adelaide's premiership drought ===
The 12-year period leading up to the 1977 SANFL Grand Final included six grand final losses for Port Adelaide, with four to Sturt and two to North Adelaide.

== Teams ==
Port Adelaide
B:	24. Anthony Hannan	22. Greg Phillips	3. Randall Gerlach
HB:	21. Len Warren	17. Peter Woite	4. Ivan Eckermann
C:	26. Bruce Light	1. Russell Ebert (c)	11. Kym Kinnear
HF:	31. Trevor Sorrell	18. David Granger	6. Andy Porplycia
F:	16. Paul Belton	5. Tim Evans	2. Darrell Cahill
Foll:	10. John Spry	27. Max James	8. Brian Cunningham
Int:	23. Tony Giles	13. Geoff Blethyn	
Coach:	John Cahill		

Glenelg
B:	Chris Hercock	Fred Phillis	Rex Voigt
HB:	Steve Hywood	Paul Weston	Jim Lihou
C:	David Johnston	David Holst	Neville Caldwell
HF:	Daryl Rady	Peter Carey	Michael Farquhar
F:	Peter McInerney	Stephen Copping	Robert Paech
Foll:	Wayne Phillis (c)	Graham Cornes	Kym Hodgeman
Int:	Syd Jackson	Peter Johnston	
Coach:	John Nicholls		

Teams listed in the Sunday Mail.

== Scorecard ==
1977 SANFL Grand Final
Saturday, 24 September (2:10 pm)	Port Adelaide	def.	Glenelg	Football Park (crowd: 56,717)
4.3 (27); 9.7 (61); 13.9 (87); 17.11 (113)	Q1; Q2; Q3; Final	5.2 (32); 8.3 (51); 12.6 (78); 16.9 (105)
Evans 7 Eckerman 3 Granger, Cunningham 2 James, Blethyn, Sorrell 1	Goals	5 Paech; 3 Phillis; 2 Rady, Carey; 1 Hodgeman, Farquhar, Holst, Jackson
Cunningham, Ebert, Gerlach, Light, Evans	Best	Hodgeman, Voigt, Carey, Cornes

== Physicality ==
The 1977 Grand Final was a physical affair with Port Adelaide wingman Bruce Light reported for striking, Kym Kinnear was concussed by Graham Cornes and taken from the ground, and several other players sustaining injuries throughout the match. Twenty players were involved in a brawl at the half-time siren.

Twenty-four-year-old Randall Gerlach retired after the game after playing for two years with kidney problems.

== End of 12-year Premiership Drought for Port Adelaide ==
The 1977 premiership marked the end of a 12-year period for Port Adelaide without winning a premiership (a long time by club standards). The 1977 premiership was the first of four premierships in five years for Port Adelaide, with premierships in 1979, 1980 and 1981. Port Adelaide supporters voted the 1977 SANFL Grand Final as the fourth-greatest moment of the club's history at Football Park in August 2013.

== 2007 AFL Heritage Round ==
In the 2007 AFL Heritage Round, Port Adelaide wore a replica of their 1977 jumper. Playing in the Port Adelaide team were Brett Ebert, son of Russell Ebert; and Chad and Kane Cornes, sons of Graham Cornes.
