= James Hawkes =

James Hawkes may refer to:

- James B. Hawkes (1857-1936), Canadian politician
- Jim Hawkes (born 1934), Canadian politician
- James Hawkes (congressman) (1776–1865), American politician from New York
- James S. Hawkes (1856–1918), Australian accountant and civil engineer
- James Hawkes (missionary) (1853–1932), missionary in Persia
