= George Brock (footballer) =

Australian rules footballer (1919–1941)

Personal information
- Full name: Halcombe George Brock
- Born: 3 April 1919; Casterton, Victoria
- Died: 2 August 1941 (aged 22) near the You Yangs, Victoria
- Original team: Port Adelaide
- Height: 189 cm (6 ft 2 in)
- Weight: 92 kg (203 lb)

Playing career^{1}
Years	Club	Games (Goals)
1937, 1939–1940	Port Adelaide	24 (26)
1941	North Melbourne	4 (3)
- ^{1} Playing statistics correct to the end of 1941.

Career highlights
- Port Adelaide premiership player (1939)

Halcombe George Brock (3 April 1919 – 2 August 1941) was an Australian rules football ruckman who played 24 senior games with Port Adelaide Football Club in the South Australian National Football League (SANFL), and 4 senior games with the North Melbourne in the Victorian Football League (VFL). He died as the result of an air collision during a RAAF training exercise on Saturday, 2 August 1941.

== Family ==
The son of Denzil William Brock, and Maude Josephine Brock, née Koch, of "Fairleigh", Merino, Western Victoria, he was born on 3 April 1919.

== Footballer ==
=== Exeter Football Club ===
Recruited from the Exeter Football Club in the South Australian Amateur Football League (SAAFL), he played one senior game for Port Adelaide in 1937.

He returned to Exeter for the 1938 season, winning selection in the SAAFL's State team for the Australian Amateur Football Carnival in Launceston. In the match against New South Wales, Brock was the best on ground.

=== Port Adelaide ===
He returned to Port Adelaide and played for them in the 1939 and 1940 seasons.

=== North Melbourne ===
He sustained serious head injuries in a car crash, in Adelaide, on Saturday night, 26 September 1940 (the evening of the S.A. Grand Final between Sturt and South Adelaide) – which explains the remarks made about Brock's first appearance for North Melbourne, against Hawthorn, on 5 July 1941: "Recently injured, [Brock] played with one side of his head plastered", and "[Brock] was playing at a disadvantage through a recent head injury".

Following his enlistment in the RAAF on 6 January 1941, and his subsequent relocation to the RAAF Flying Training School in Victoria, Brock was granted a permit to play with North Melbourne in the Victorian Football League (VFL) on Saturday morning, 5 July 1941. He played in his first match for North Melbourne that afternoon; and then played on each of the next three Saturdays (i.e., 4 senior games in all).

== Death ==
He was killed in an aircraft accident near the You Yangs, on 2 August 1941, during a RAAF training exercise in World War II, when two training aircraft, flying in formation, collided with one another.

Brock had been chosen to play for North Melbourne against Richmond on Saturday 2 August 1941. However, because he was unable to get leave from the RAAF, he had to withdraw from the team at the last minute – and he died on that very morning (when he would have, otherwise, already been on his way to the Arden Street Oval).

=== Coroner's inquest ===
At the coroner's inquest, conducted by Mr Tingate, P.M. on 19 August 1941, evidence was given that the conditions on the day were far from satisfactory – very gusty and, as a consequence, there were many air pockets – and that Brock was a passenger in one of three aircraft flying in a V formation.

At one stage of the training exercise, the trainee pilot (Maurice McGuire 401137) of Brock's aircraft "signalled to the other pilots to change positions in the V formation, and the plane on the left of the V dropped underneath to take up a new position". Brock's plane hit an air pocket, the pilot (McGuire) "felt a bump, and his plane dropped on to the one beneath" – "[McGuire's] controls failed to respond, and the machine spun down out of control".

The trainee pilot of the other aircraft, Colin Fallon (407785), lost control of his craft immediately after the planes collided. Both he and his passenger, John Distin Hill (407792), successfully bailed out. However, despite being instructed to bail out by the pilot McGuire (who successfully escaped the aircraft), his passenger Brock did not jump. McGuire stated that "Brock must have felt the crash and known what happened, but still did not jump".

=== Coroner's verdict ===
The coroner's finding was one of accidental death.

=== Funeral ===
His funeral was held on Monday, 4 August 1941, at the Springvale Crematorium. His remains were cremated.

=== Tribute ===
"NORTH MELBOURNE – The team will wear black armbands [in their match against Carlton tomorrow] as a mark of respect to the memory of Leading Aircraftsman H.G. Brock, who was killed in an air accident last Saturday." – The Age, 8 August 1941.
"North and Carlton players stood in silence before the match for George Brock, ex-North player and South Australian airman, who was killed in an air collision last Saturday." – The Sporting Globe, 9 August 1941.
"In a brief and dignified ceremony before the [Grand Final between Norwood and Sturt on 4 October 1941], the big crowd stood in silence for a minute to honor [the eight] League players who have died on active service in the present war, The chairman of the League (Major E. Millhouse) told spectators that … they were L.K. Rudd (Port Adelaide), D. Waite (West Torrens), D.L. Carlos (Glenelg), H.G. Brock (Port Adelaide), A. Exley (Glenelg), H.R. Farrant (North Adelaide), L. Leahy (Norwood), and J. Wade (Port Adelaide)." – The Chronicle, 9 October 1941.

== See also ==
- List of Victorian Football League players who died on active service
