= Conole =

Conole is a surname. Notable people with the surname include:

- Gráinne Conole (born 1964), Irish academic
- Reg Conole (1902–1967), Australian rules footballer

== See also ==
- Connole (disambiguation)
