= Grave Danger (disambiguation) =

"Grave Danger" is an episode of the American crime drama CSI: Crime Scene Investigation

Grave Danger may also refer to:

- David Granger (footballer) (a.k.a. Grave Danger, 1955–2024), Australian rules footballer
- "Grave Danger" (The Cleveland Show), a 2013 episode of The Cleveland Show
- "Grave Danger" (Ninjago: Masters of Spinjitzu), a 2015 episode of Ninjago: Masters of Spinjitzu
- "Grave Danger" (Slow Horses), 2024 TV episode
- Grave Danger, a Hardy Boys mystery novel
- Monster Madness: Grave Danger, a 2008 video game published by SouthPeak Games
- Grave Danger, a 2005 Rat City Rollergirls roller derby team
