= John Sidoli =

Australian rules footballer and cricketer

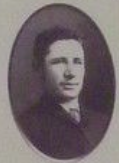
- Sidoli in 1882

Personal information
- Full name: John Baptist Sidoli
- Nickname: Jack
- Born: 15 September 1855; Exeter, South Australia
- Died: 3 November 1934 (aged 79); Semaphore, South Australia
- Position: Follower

Playing career^{1}
Years	Club	Games (Goals)
1870–1876	Port Adelaide (interclub)	30
1877–1885	Port Adelaide (SAFA)	118
Total		148
- ^{1} Playing statistics correct to the end of 1885.

Career highlights
- 2× Port Adelaide best and fairest (1880, 1881); Port Adelaide premiership player (1884)

John B. "Jack" Sidoli (15 September 1855 – 3 November 1934) was an Australian rules footballer for Port Adelaide in the 19th century, noted for his versatility. He also played cricket for South Australia, and was a member of the Royal South Australian Yacht Squadron. He was both a football and cricket umpire.

== Football ==
John Sidoli was a foundation player for the Port Adelaide Football Club.

He won two Port Adelaide best and fairest awards, in 1880 and 1881, and would also play in the club's inaugural premiership in 1884. Sidoli also played eight interstate football matches for South Australia, while his career total of 148 games was a club record until broken by Harry "Tick" Phillips in 1897.

Jack Reedman described John Sidoli in 1923 as "One of the best. He was a big little man. He also followed for Port and could keep up the pace all day. Jack was a splendid kick, but was not looked to as one likely materially to add to the goal tally...Jack was decidedly clever at little marks – none could show him points in that connection."

In 1934 the Adelaide publication Sport described Sidoli as a footballer who could "follow all through a match...Always one of the best, both temperamentally and in the ruck. He could take a knock and return the compliment with a smile, instead of trying to annihilate the cove who gave him the cropper."

== Cricket ==
John Sidoli played for the South Australian cricket team in six interstate matches.

== Tradesman ==
Sidoli worked as a shipwright and blacksmith in Port Adelaide, initially working in a partnership as Hosie & Sidoli before founding his own business, Sidoli and Son; which he retired from in about 1931.

== Personal life ==
He had one brother, Angelo Gabriel, and two sisters, A. Ringer and L. A. Quinn. Sidoli and his wife, Mary Ann, had 11 children. He was survived by three sons, Herbert, Jack and Arnold, and five daughters, Marion, Victoria, Madeline, Lorna and A. B. Mortimer.

John Sidoli was an uncle to John Quinn Sr. and thus a great uncle to Bob Quinn and Tom Quinn.
