= Bob Quinn (Australian footballer) =

Australian rules footballer and coach

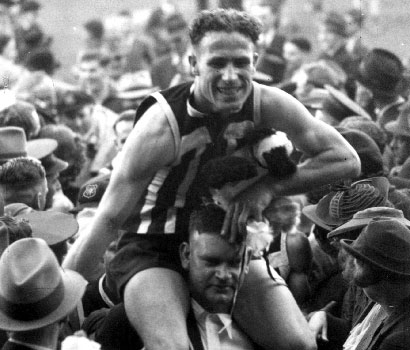
- Bob Quinn being chaired off Adelaide Oval after captaining Port Adelaide to victory in the 1939 SANFL Grand Final.

Personal information
- Full name: Robert Berrima Quinn
- Nickname: Bob
- Born: 9 April 1915; Birkenhead, South Australia
- Died: 12 September 2008 (aged 93); Adelaide, South Australia
- Original team: Semaphore Centrals
- Height: 167 cm (5 ft 6 in)
- Weight: 67 kg (148 lb)

Playing career^{1}
Years	Club	Games (Goals)
1933–1947	Port Adelaide	239 (386)
1944	Port/Torrens (World War II)	12 (28)
Total		251 (414)

Representative team honours
Years	Team	Games (Goals)
1936–1947	South Australia	15 (26)

Coaching career^{3}
Years	Club	Games (W–L–D)
1939–1940; 1945–1947	Port Adelaide	87 (63–24–0); 72.41%
1953	South Australia	4 (3–1–0); 75.00%
- ^{1} Playing statistics correct to the end of 1947.^{3} Coaching statistics correct as of 1953.

Career highlights
- Club: 2× Magarey Medal (1938, 1945); 3× Port Adelaide premiership player (1936, 1937, 1939); Port Adelaide captain (1939–40, 1945–47); 4× Port Adelaide best and fairest (1937, 1938, 1945, 1947); 2× Port Adelaide leading goalkicker (1937, 1945); Representative: South Australia captain (1945, 1946, 1947); 15 games for South Australia; All-Australian captain (1947); Coaching: Port Adelaide premiership coach (1939); Honours: Australian Football Hall of Fame (1996); South Australian Football Hall of Fame (2002); Port Adelaide's greatest team (left half forward); Inaugural Port Adelaide #1 ticket holder in the AFL; Namesake for SANFL medal awarded on ANZAC Day.

Robert Berrima Quinn MM (9 April 1915 – 12 September 2008) was a champion Australian rules footballer with the Port Adelaide Football Club in the South Australian National Football League (SANFL), and a decorated soldier of the Second World War.

== Early life ==
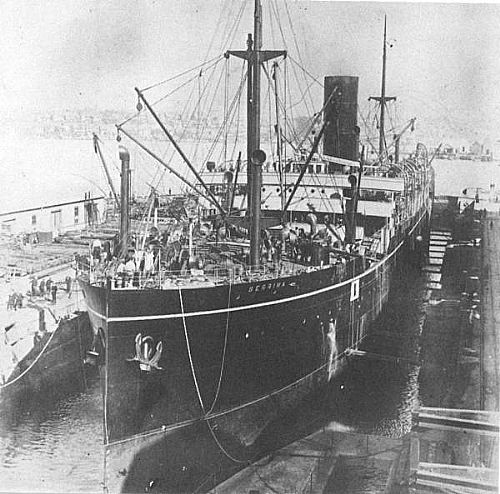
John Quinn, Bob's father, gave his son the middle name Berrima after the SS Berrima which he worked on.

Quinn was born in Birkenhead, South Australia, the third of four sons (Tom, George and Jack Jnr) of John (Jack) Quinn, Sr, a leading footballer of the 1890s and 1900s who captained Port Adelaide Football Club in 1904 and 1905 and represented South Australia. Jack Quinn was a Port Adelaide wharf labourer and gave Quinn the middle name "Berrima" in memory of the SS Berrima, a troop ship that Quinn Snr worked on prior to Bob Quinn's birth.

Quinn went to the Le Fevre Peninsula School.

The Port River lapped only yards from the back door of the Quinn's Birkenhead family home, and twice weekly Bob and his father, Jack, rowed across where the Birkenhead Bridge has since been built, climbed up a ladder to the wharf, and walked to Alberton Oval.

== Football career before World War II (1933–1939) ==
As a junior Quinn played for the Semaphore Centrals Football Club.

=== 1933: Debut for Port Adelaide ===
On the 6 May 1933, Bob Quinn made his debut for Port Adelaide in Round 2 match of the 1933 SANFL season in a draw against Norwood at Alberton Oval. During the match he kicked one goal and was named in Port Adelaide's best. Playing as a rover, Quinn quickly gained a reputation as one of the leading players in South Australia.

=== 1934: Quinn vs Colyer ===
In 1934 Quinn impressed observers from early in the season, with one reporting that "Quinn is practically assured of a position in the side as a rover. His displays in both trial games were full of merit." Port started slowly in the 1934 season, despite a 131-point win over Glenelg Football Club, but improved markedly in the second half of the home and away season, showing a "machine-like" efficiency and winning their last seven games comfortably to finish minor premiers and clear flag favourites. In the first semi final, Port Adelaide again defeated Glenelg comfortably, this time by 65 points, and had a week's break while Glenelg played Sturt Football Club for the right to play Port in the Grand Final. Glenelg won but Port went into the Grand Final as heavy favourites, with Quinn expected to star. In the 1934 SANFL Grand Final, Quinn was prominent from the early stages of the match and was involved in a "battle royale" with Glenelg's star rover Roy Colyer. Although Port Adelaide trailed throughout the match and eventually lost to Glenelg by 21 points, Quinn was close to best on ground, kicking a match high five goals.

=== 1935: Port finish runner up again ===
During the 1935 SANFL season Port Adelaide would win the minor premiership but falter in the Grand Final to South Adelaide by 8 points.

=== 1936: Quinn pulls Port over the line ===
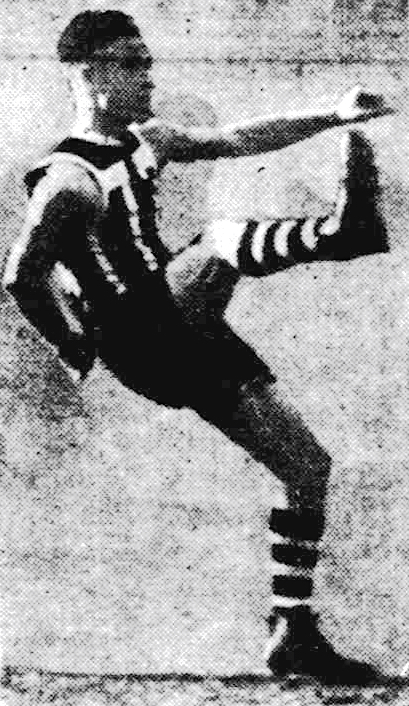
Bob Quinn during the 1936 SANFL season.

In 1936 Bob Quinn was named in South Australia's state team for the first time. It would also be a breakthrough year for Port Adelaide, with Sampson Hosking returning as coach, the club went on to win the 1936 SANFL Grand Final against Sturt Football Club. Port Adelaide were trailing by five goals at half time but, led by Quinn's "magnificent roving", Port recovered to win by three points. It was Quinn's first senior premiership and the clubs first since 1928.

=== 1937: Back to back and Magarey runner up ===
In 1937, Quinn was runner-up in the Magarey Medal, won the club Best and Fairest and was Port's leading goalkicker with 51 goals in another premiership year. In the Magarey Medal count, Quinn came second behind North Adelaide Football Club's Harold Hawke, polling 36 voyes to Hawke's 37. Generally, the voting Magarey Medal voting is conducted under a 3–2–1 vote system but under a trial, 1937 saw votes awarded under a 5–3–1 system. Had 1937 been conducted under the 3–2–1 system, Quinn would have beaten Hawke 24 votes to 23 to receive what would have been the first of three Magarey Medals.

=== 1938: First Magarey and Victorian approaches ===
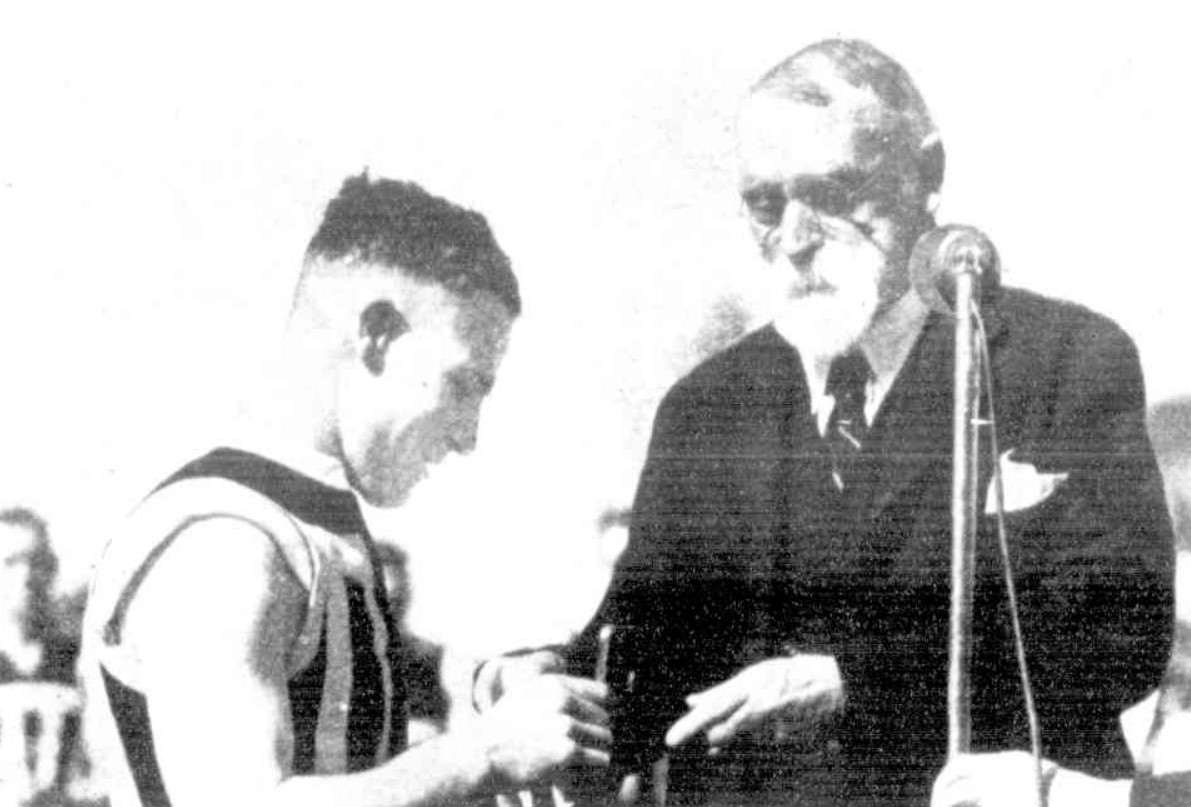
T.S. O'Halloran presenting Quinn with the 1938 Magarey Medal.

In 1938 Quinn was awarded the Magarey Medal for the best player in the SANFL as well as a second Port Best and Fairest award. Following a match for South Australia against Victoria in Adelaide in early July 1938, Quinn was offered a contract with VFL club Geelong (for which his brother Tom played). Quinn was believed to be prepared to accept the offer if the VFL dropped its residency rule where interstate players were required to stand out of football for twelve months before being allowed to play in the VFL. Later in the year, Quinn was reported to have changed his preference of VFL clubs to St Kilda, and was quoted as saying he had "definitely decided to go to Victoria" and that Port Adelaide had agreed not to oppose his transfer. At the start of 1939 both St Kilda and Geelong were both pursuing Bob Quinn sending scouts to Adelaide in addition to then Richmond secretary Maurie Sheahan also enquiring about his services.

=== 1939: Captain-coach of Port Adelaide ===
Ultimately Quinn would be elevated to captain-coach of Port Adelaide in 1939. Quinn would lead Port to a premiership in his first year as coach with new recruit Bob McLean dominating in the ruck and up forward for Port Adelaide. The 1939 premiership was Quinn's third as a player.

== War service (1940–1943) ==
The start of the Second World War led many of his leading players to quit football to enlist in the armed forces. Bob Quinn enlisted for the Australian Army in June 1940 as a Warrant Officer Class 2 while still serving as captain-coach of the Port Adelaide Football Club.

=== Tobruk ===
Warrant Officer Quinn was ordered to take command of the 10th platoon and blow up a barbed-wire barrier and attack an enemy post from which a machine gun was inflicting heavy casualties...To blow up the barbed wire they had to jump out of a trench and lay a Bangalore torpedo, an explosive charge placed on the end of a long, extendable tube. Under an unrelenting hail of fire, Quinn looked at his men in the trench and told them they were probably facing death, and how he would lay the last pipe, the most difficult of all because it was the closest to the machine gun. One by one, Quinn ordered his men to jump from the trench and place a pipe under the wire. Only three of the seven came back. It was then Quinn's turn, and he was hit by shrapnel which put a hole in the top of his right thigh, but he still put the last pipe down, which ultimately made this crucial mission successful. On his way back to the trench, Quinn picked up a wounded mate, and was hit again, this time in the face, prompting another to say: "Hell, Bob, half your face is blown away." Quinn responded: "Any change would be a … improvement."

— Independent Weekly

Quinn was soon after shipped out to fight in the North African campaign as part of the 2/43rd battalion to be stationed in Tobruk, Libya. Showing the same fearlessness that he displayed in football, as a Warrant Officer Quinn was awarded the Military Medal for bravery at the Siege of Tobruk, when, on 3 August 1941, Quinn took command of the 10th platoon and defied German troops, ignoring the wounds he received during the battle.

=== Pacific ===
Commissioned a lieutenant, Quinn was transferred to the Pacific, and in September 1943 severely injured his knee, arm and face in New Guinea. It was feared that due to these injuries he may never play again. When he did return to football, Quinn wore a leather strap on his arm to protect it.

=== Lost Brother ===
Bob Quinn's brother George also played with Port Adelaide before being killed in action in Egypt in July 1942. George had faked his age in order to enlist.

== Return to football (1944–1947) ==
Despite serious injuries to his arm, leg, and face Quinn returned to Australia and resumed his footballing career despite early prognosis suggesting he would never play again.

=== 1944: Last year as Port/Torrens ===
debuting playing 12 games and kicking 28 goals for a combined Port Adelaide/West Torrens side in a reduced SANFL competition due to the war. His return match was the first round of the 1944 season, where Port Adelaide/West Torrens played 1943 premiers North/Norwood at the Adelaide Oval. Quinn was given a standing ovation from the crowd. Quinn's injuries and years away from competition meant he was a slower player than in his pre-war career and was forced to change his playing style, running with the ball less and increased his use of handball. Playing in the second semifinal against Sturt/South Adelaide at Adelaide Oval, Quinn was a leading player when, early in the third quarter, he took a mark and fell heavily, breaking his arm, wrenching his left thumb and badly bruising his hip but still played out the match. There was particular concern about Quinn's broken arm, as the break was just below a severe wound he received in New Guinea.

=== 1945: Quinn & Bunton ===
The 1945 SANFL season returned to an eight club competition with all clubs competing in their own right. Quinn started the season with an arm sound sustained in World War II but showed that he lost nothing of his skill and determination, winning a second Magarey Medal with 45 votes, 17 ahead of second place Doug Olds of Norwood Football Club. He polled votes in twelve of the sixteen games he played, with six best on grounds, five sets of two votes and one one-vote performance. Additionally, Quinn won a third club Best and Fairest and a second club Leading Goalkicking award, with his 51 goals equalling his 1937 return for most goals in a season. 1945 also saw Haydn Bunton, Sr., one of the greatest Australian rules players of all time, join Port Adelaide for his final season of football. Quinn and Bunton regularly combined during the season to show off their superior skills to the admiring crowds. On 7 July, Quinn captained South Australia against Victoria at the Adelaide Oval, leading South Australia to a 17.23 (125) to 10.13 (73) win. Quinn was voted Best on Ground for his "volatile ground play" and was chaired off the ground by his teammates at the end of the match. Port Adelaide finished the minor round on top of the table, three wins clear of clear of second place West Torrens, and were firm favorites for the Grand Final, against West Torrens. After leading early, Port were overtaken by a faster finishing West Torrens who defeated Port Adelaide 15.25 (115) to 15.12 (102). Quinn was named as one of the best for the losing team.

=== 1946: Draw in Victoria ===
In 1946 Quinn captained South Australia to a come from behind draw with Victoria. After the match Quinn was approached by the doctor who operated on him in New Guinea. The doctor told Bob that he saw his name in a Melbourne newspaper as captain of South Australia and in disbelief came to watch the game. He asked Bob to show him his leg and is said to have quipped "Bloody good job I made of that didn't I?"

=== 1947: Sporting Life's All-Australian captain and retirement ===
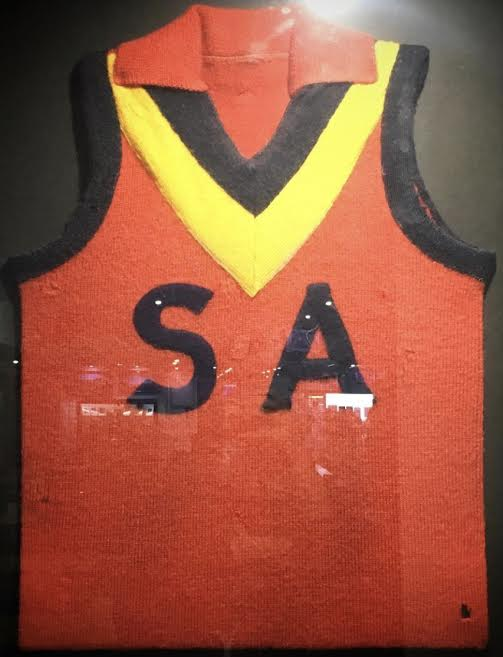
Bob Quinn's 1947 South Australian state football team guernsey is on display at Alberton Oval.

Bob Quinn was named as captain in the first version of an All-Australian team, a concept created by Sporting Life magazine.

During 1947, Quinn's final season as a player, he won a fourth Port Best and Fairest. Sporting Life magazine named Quinn as the captain in the first concept of an All-Australian team with only three South Australian's selected in the side. On his retirement, Quinn had played 186 games for Port Adelaide, kicking 386 goals, plus a further 15 games and 26 goals for South Australia (which he captained from 1945 to 1947).

== Post-football ==
Quinn originally planned to continue as non-playing coach of Port Adelaide but announced his resignation as coach in late March 1948, deciding instead to move to Kadina in South Australia's Yorke Peninsula to become the proprietor of the local Central Hotel and coach local football teams.

Quinn's involvement with local teams led to his appointment as coach of the Yorke Peninsula Football Association in 1950 and South Australia at the 1953 Adelaide Carnival. Additionally, Quinn played the occasional charity match and in 1950 was forced to take the field for Yorke Peninsula in a match against Yorke Valley Association when his team was a player short. Quinn lasted five minutes before fracturing his pelvis after colliding heavily with an opponent and was forced to spend several weeks in hospital recovering.

Quinn also became a newspaper columnist for Adelaide newspaper The Advertiser and was a guest tipster for rival newspaper The News.

Quinn also bought racehorses and had his first win as an owner in April 1954 when 14–1 Baluarte won at Murray Bridge.

Later in life, Quinn returned to Adelaide and bought the Southwark Hotel, serving as publican there for many years.

== Personal life ==
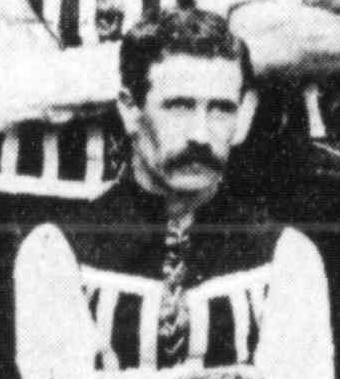
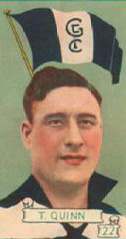
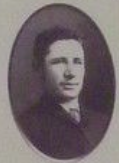
Left: Bob's father John Quinn captained Port Adelaide in 1904 and 1905. He was part of the clubs 1906 premiership
Middle: Tom Quinn, Bob's older brother, was a premiership player for Port Adelaide in 1928 before being offered a job in Victoria. He would be named in Geelong's Team of the Century.
Right: John Sidoli, Bob Quinn's great uncle, was a foundation player for Port Adelaide in 1870.

=== Sporting family ===
Bob Quinn's father, John (Jack) Quinn, Sr, was a leading footballer of the 1890s and 1900s who also captained the Port Adelaide Football Club in 1904 and 1905 and represented South Australia whilst his great uncle John Sidoli was a foundation player for the club. Bob Quinn was the third of four sons, all of whom were leading footballers of their time: Eldest brother Jack Jnr played for Port Adelaide, second eldest Tom played for Port Adelaide between 1928 and 1930 before his transfer to Geelong Football Club in the Victorian Football League (VFL) and youngest brother George also played with distinction for Port Adelaide

Quinn's wife May represented South Australia in netball while Quinn's son Robert Jnr, played league football for Port Adelaide and South Adelaide Football Club, and son Greg played reserves for Port Adelaide and Adelaide grade cricket as a wicketkeeper.

Quinn's brother-in-law Charlie "Chilla" Walker was a leading South Australian cricketer.

The South Australian Cricket Association's annual trophy for the best wicketkeeper in the Adelaide grade competition is named after Walker. Greg Quinn won it seven times.

=== Death ===
In 2008 Quinn died after a long illness at age 93, preceded by his wife May in 1995. He was survived by four children, eight grandchildren and twelve great-grandchildren.

Following Quinn's death, fellow Port player and coach John Cahill praised his courage and charisma; "he had a presence, and for someone that achieved so much on and off the field he was so humble and quietly spoken".

== Reputation ==
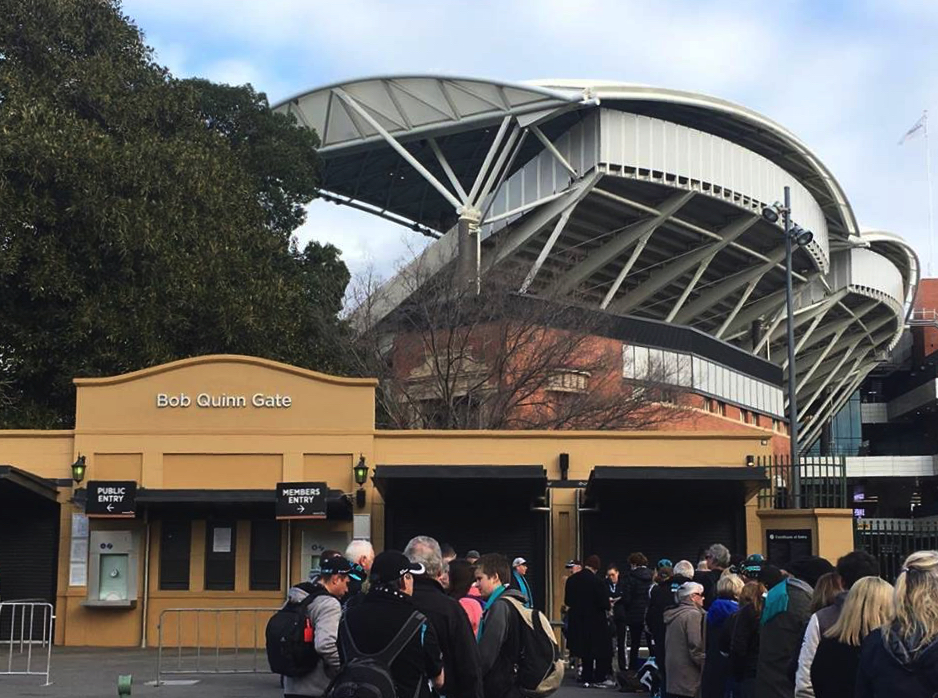
The northern gates at Adelaide Oval are named after Bob Quinn.

**Magarey Medal votes**
Season	Votes
1933	?
1934	?
1935	?
1936	26
1937	36
1938	32
1939	4
1940	?
1941	?
1945	46
1946	4
1947	14
**Total**	**162**
Key:
Green / **Bold** = Won

Quinn was made a life member of the Port Adelaide Football Club in 1944. When Port Adelaide gained admission to the Australian Football League Quinn was named as joint number one ticket holder for 1997. Quinn was an inaugural member of the Port Adelaide Football Club Hall of Fame in 1998. Quinn was made a life member of the SANFL in 2002. Quinn was an inaugural inductee into the Australian Football Hall of Fame in 1996.

The northern gate of Adelaide Oval is named in honour of Bob Quinn. When the new Alberton Oval grandstand was built in 1972, it was named the RB Quinn Stand in his honour.

The Bob Quinn medal, first awarded in 2002, is bestowed to the best player on ground at the annual SANFL ANZAC Day match.

South Australian sports journalist Ray Barber described Bob Quinn as being "beautifully balanced, a two sided player with great courage, a splendid ground player with a 'daisy cutter' stab pass that made him a legend."

Tim Ginever, former Port Adelaide captain, stated regarding Bob Quinn that "If you talk to a lot of people of that era, they still say he's the best player of the footy club."

West Adelaide captain John Taylor Jnr, opponent of Bob Quinn in his final game said that Bob was "The best captain I've ever seen and the best the State has ever had.'

Triple Brownlow and Sandover medalist Haydn Bunton Sr considered Bob Quinn to be the best South Australian player he had seen and one of the best players he had come across during his career describing him as being "A beautiful rover, polished and with a ton of guts. He was a model to the SA sides in how to dish it out and take it with Victorian teams."

== Sources ==
- Atkinson, G. (1982) Everything you ever wanted to know about Australian rules football but couldn't be bothered asking, The Five Mile Press: Melbourne. ISBN 0 86788 009 0.
- Gyss, T. (2013) 1942–44 World War II South Australian Football Seasons Report, Self-published. ISBN 978 1 105 90723 4.
- Gyss, T. (2012) 1945 South Australian Football Season Report, Self-published. ISBN 978 1 105 90943 6.
