= Torrens Island Concentration Camp =

World War I concentration camp in Australia

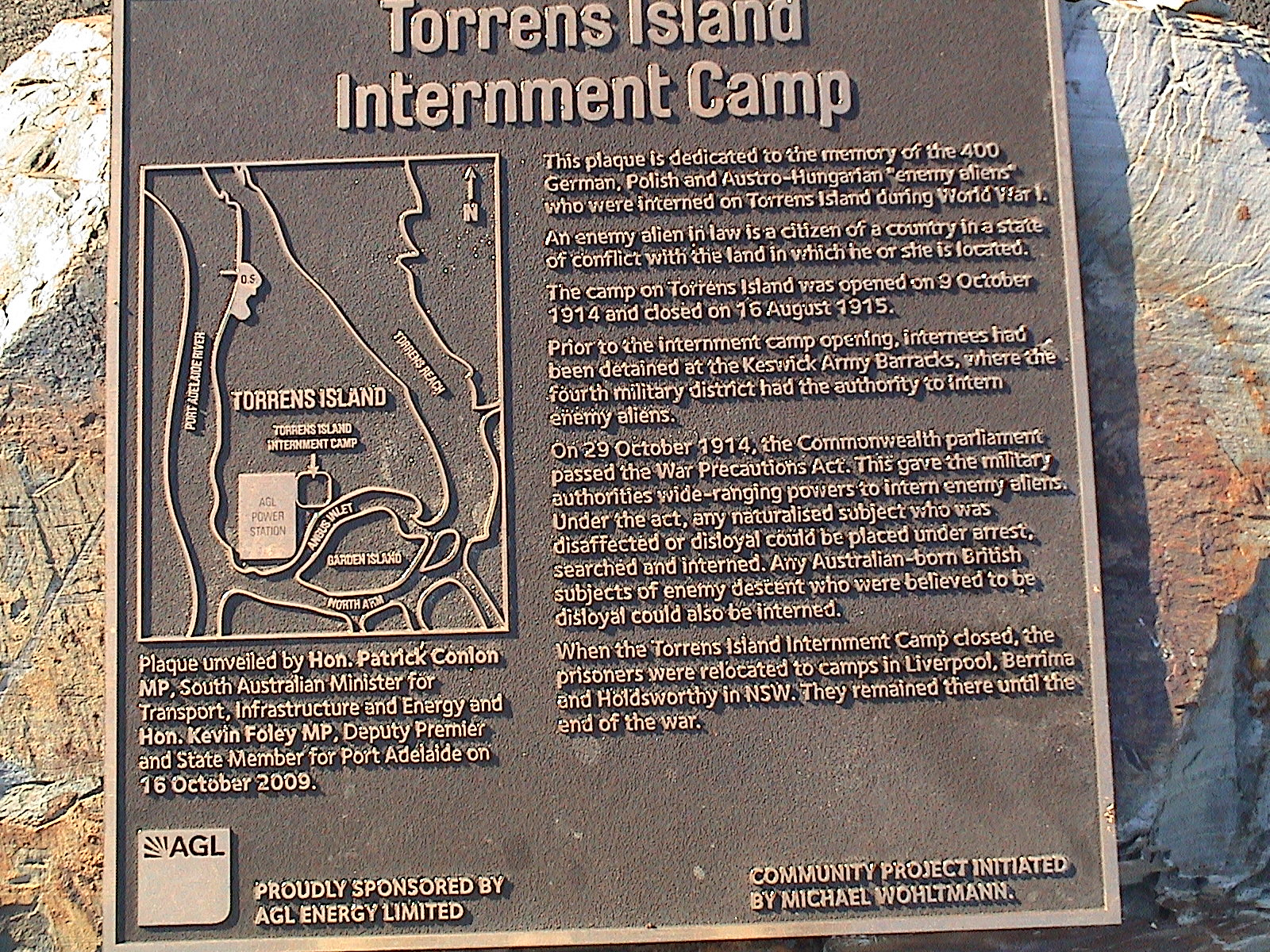
The Torrens Island Internment Camp plaque, located adjacent to the causeway on Garden Island. 34°48′36.7″S 138°31′31.1″E

The Torrens Island Internment Camp was a World War I concentration camp, located on Torrens Island in the Port River Estuary near Adelaide in South Australia. The camp opened on 9 October 1914 and held up to 400 men of German or Austro-Hungarian background, or crew members of enemy ships who had been caught in Australian ports at the beginning of the war. They were held without trial under the provisions of the War Precautions Act 1914.

== History ==
The South Australian population included a large minority of German descent, and the outbreak of the First World War in 1914 brought a wave of anti-German feeling. At official level, the War Precautions Act permitted sweeping powers of search, seizure of property and arrest. Lutheran churches and schools were closed and German-language newspapers were banned. In August 1914, soldiers were sent out under the authority of the Act to round up about 300 of what were called "Germans". The internees included some German and Austro-Hungarian citizens and some Australian-born, a mixture of farmers, intellectuals, and Lutheran pastors. They were only a small fraction of the people of German descent in South Australia; and, with them, the army had rounded up some citizens of Sweden, the Netherlands, and one from the USA – all neutral countries.

At first, the prisoners were interned in a barbed-wire compound at Keswick Barracks within the Adelaide suburbs. As the numbers grew, in October, they were taken by boat to Torrens Island. The island was nearly deserted except for a Quarantine Station, built in the nineteenth century. A fenced compound was built on the bank of the Port River about 500 m south of the Quarantine Station, which had the only jetty on the island. The prisoners were interned there in tents under armed guard. At the time, it was officially called a Concentration Camp.

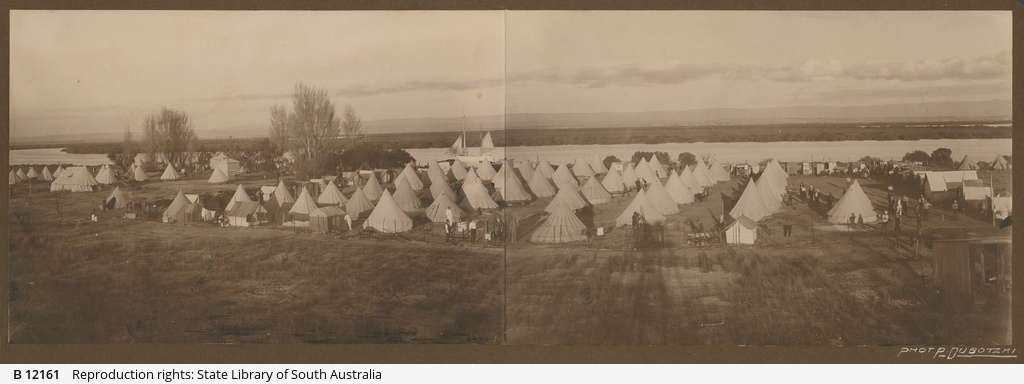
Tents at Torrens Island Internment Camp, 1914.

In its first few months, the Torrens Island internment camp was uncomfortable but not harsh. The internees were housed in tents and made to cater for their own cooking requirements, including growing their own food. Despite these hardships, the inmates managed to organise cultural events and entertainment, and even published a number of editions of a camp newspaper, Der Kamerad. Internee Paul Dubotzki was a professional photographer who was permitted to have a camera in the camp, and his photographs provide a record of conditions.

In early 1915, a new commanding officer, Captain G.E. Hawkes, was posted to the camp and, in about March 1915, the camp was shifted to another location further south away from the Quarantine Station, on the southern end of Torrens Island. The reason for the move was not given, but was presumably because its close proximity would compromise the Quarantine Station in the event of a quarantine emergency. The evidence of a later Court of Enquiry says, "The Camp about this time was removed from the site which this Court has already described, to the southern end of the island, near an old quarantine station which had been unused for many years."

The two sites of the Torrens Island Internment Camp.

Captain Hawkes was to prove extremely unsuitable for the position. Under his command, treatment of the internees deteriorated. He encouraged an atmosphere in which guards became routinely offensive and violent in their behaviour, and soon afterward stories of brutal treatment began to be circulated. Subsequent enquiries found evidence of prisoners being punished for disciplinary offences by exposing them to the weather in an open barbed-wire compound, prisoners habitually being prodded with bayonets, and illegal punishments in which internees were stripped, handcuffed and publicly flogged. One of these incidents involved a Swedish and an American citizen. There were also rumours of worse brutalities and prisoners being shot dead by guards, but the facts about Torrens Island are difficult to verify. On one occasion, Captain Hawkes had fired his pistol into a tent full of internees, wounding one. Flogging the American proved to be a serious mistake. The prisoner wrote to the US Consul about conditions in the camp, forcing an enquiry in June which brought conditions into the open.

The camp was quietly closed in August 1915, many of the internees were released, and others were transferred to a more humanely-run camp at Holsworthy in New South Wales. Captain Hawkes was dismissed from the service, and in 1916 a Court of Enquiry was held into his conduct. None of this became public knowledge in Australia until after the war, when in 1919 the Adelaide press published the story. However, word of the incident had reached Germany, and returning Australian prisoners of war told of being threatened with reprisals, though none took place. The official records of the Torrens Island camp were destroyed, and today virtually all that is known about the incident comes from the only wartime records that survive, principally the typescript and evidence from the Court of Enquiry.

== The sites today ==
The locations of the sites of the Torrens Island Internment Camp are known fairly accurately, but there is no physical evidence remaining today. The site of the first camp was on the western side of the island on the bank of the Port River, a few hundred metres south of the Quarantine Station, much of which still stands. The internment site was a tented encampment occupied for only five months, October 1914 to March 1915, and was then systematically removed. Nothing can be identified on the site today. The site of the second camp was at the southern end of the island on the bank of Angas Inlet, and occupied from March to August 1915. It too was systematically removed, and anything that remained was later obliterated by modern construction. The site is under or close to the switchyard of Section B of the Torrens Island Power Station, built in 1973.

== Exhibition ==
An exhibition, Interned: Torrens Island, 1914–1915 was held at the South Australian Migration Museum from October 2014 to September 2015 to mark the centenary of the internment camp, accompanied by the publication of a book of the same name.
