= Connole =

Connole may refer to:

- Bruce Connole (born 1958), American singer, songwriter, and guitarist
- Jack Connole (1890-1958), Australian rules footballer
- USS Connole, a Knox-class frigate

== See also ==
- Conole, a surname
