= Holsworthy Internment Camp =

Historic commonwealth heritage site in Holsworthy NSW

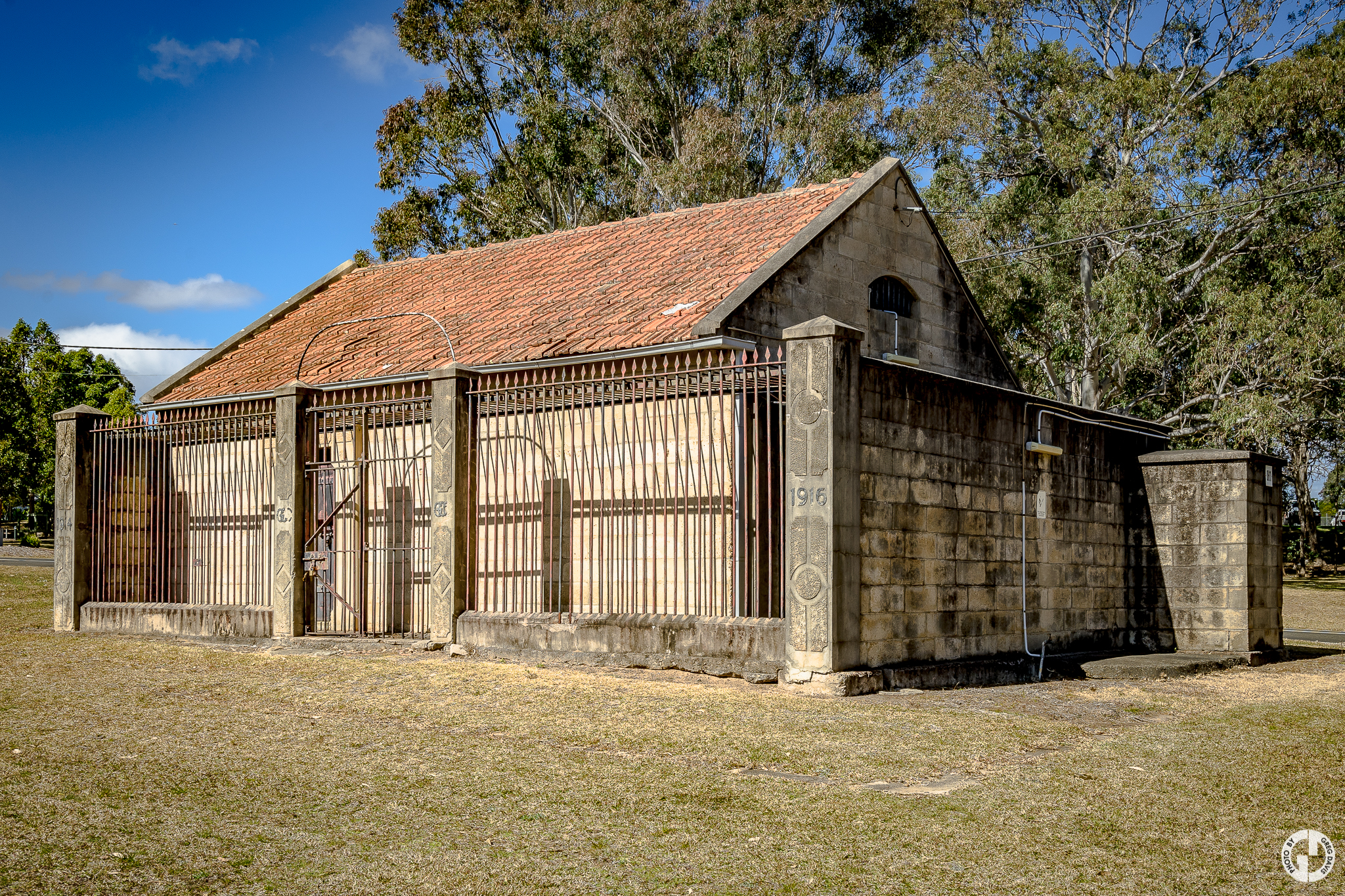

Holsworthy Internment Camp was the largest camp for prisoners of war in Australia during World War I. It was located at Holsworthy, near Liverpool on the outskirts of Sydney. There are varying estimates of the number of internees between 4,000 and 7,000.

== History ==
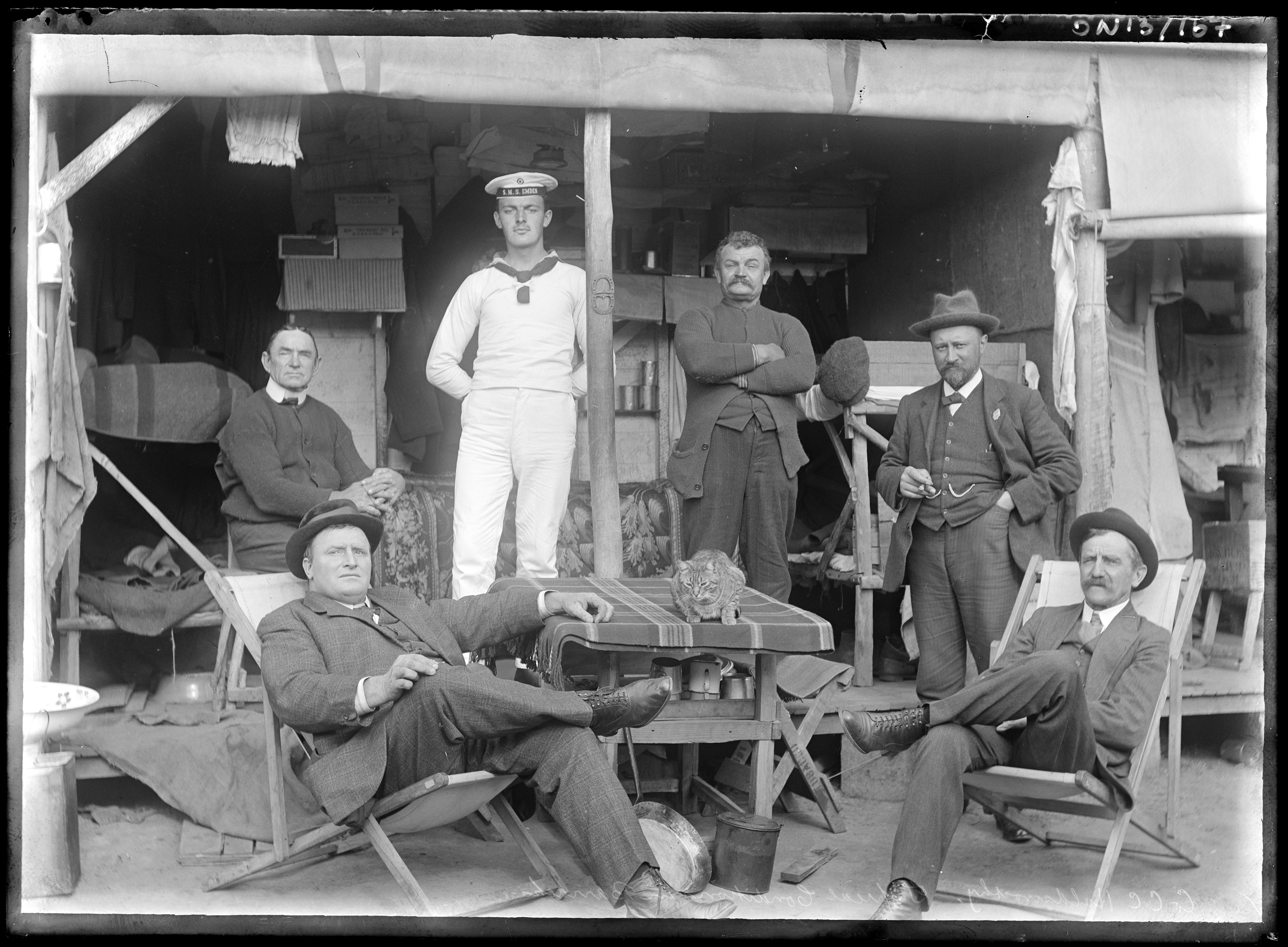
Internees, German Concentration Camp, Holsworthy near Liverpool, New South Wales, 1916

The Australian Defence Force acquired 80,000 acres (approximately 32,375 hectares) of land at Holsworthy before the beginning of World War I. Following the declaration of war, all German subjects in Australia were declared 'enemy aliens' and were required to report and notify the Government of their address. In February 1915 enemy aliens were interned either voluntarily or on an enforced basis. In New South Wales the principal place of internment was the Holsworthy Internment Camp where between 4,000 and 7,000 men were detained.

Most of the internees were from Austria-Hungary including Germans, Slavic men mostly from Dalmatia, as well as Czechs, Slovaks and Hungarians, staff of German companies who were living in Australia, crews of ships caught in Australian ports as well as naturalised and native born Australians of German descent. These prisoners were interned without trial. After the war many of these internees were deported to Germany.

=== Riots ===
In early 1915 there were riots over rations and work duties. In 1916 there were riots when a crime gang calling itself the Black Hand assaulted and extorted money and goods from fellow internees.

== See also ==
- Torrens Island Concentration Camp
