= J. H. M. Hawkes =

Australian businesspeople (1851 – 1944)

John Henry Mason Hawkes (9 July 1851 – 5 May 1944) was a businessman in the early days of Adelaide, South Australia

== History ==
Hawkes was born in Goodwood, South Australia, the eldest surviving son of John Henry Mason Hawkes (c. 1827 – 14 October 1858) and his wife Frances Sarah Ann Hawkes, née Symonds (c. 1831 – 15 February 1902). Both were early settlers; Hawkes aboard Gratitude in August 1848, and Frances Sarah Anne Symonds on Marion in February 1849. They married later that same year. She was in 1880 to marry again, to the recently widowed William Henville Burford.

Hawkes grew up in Port Adelaide, and like his brother James attended Adelaide Educational Institution, but unlike him was not a prize-winning student.

In 1871 he began marketing writing ink and branding inks (used with a stencil for labelling bales of wool etc.), manufactured at premises at 88 Currie Street, then the following year moved to Coromandel Place, off Grenfell Street, where his four or five employees also produced animal charcoal for filtering water and a washing powder. The business was wound up in 1878.

When the South Australian Government adopted a protectionist policy around 1880, the management of D. & J. Fowler, Limited, decided to begin manufacturing groceries, and began offering farmers a market for products such as chicory, which had previously been imported. Around 1885 they appointed Hawkes manager of that side of their Adelaide business, with a staff of eight, which forty years later had grown to ninety.

== Other interests ==
In May 1878 he was succeeded Dedman as treasurer of the South Australian Football Club, and was a member of the Flinders Cricket Club in 1880.

Around 1881 he purchased 464 acres (188 ha) in the Hundred of Davenport.

Hawkes represented D. & J. Fowler at the SA Chamber of Manufactures

He was a member of the Church of Christ, and helped found churches at Maylands and Nailsworth, was a leader of the Men's Bible Class at Norwood and was for 25 a reader, in rotation with John Verco and W. C. Brooker, and served as lay preacher at Queenstown.

He was a member of the St. Peters Model Parliament, and the Chapel Street (Norwood) Literary Society, of which he was president in 1893.

In October 1921 he and Alexander H. Dobbie were appointed to the State Advisory Council on Science and Industry.

== Family ==
Robert Hawkes (c. 1803 – 30 August 1866) married to Sarah; he was land agent of King William Street; home on Magill Road, Norwood. Arrived SA August 1848 aboard Gratitude with their family:

- John Henry Mason Hawkes (c. 1827 – 14 October 1858) married Frances Ann Symonds (c. 1831 – 15 February 1902) in 1849. Their children included:

- Robert Symonds Hawkes (1850–1850)
- John Henry Mason Hawkes (1851 – 5 May 1944) married Rosina "Rose" Brooks (1856 – 12 August 1937) of Oakbank on 7 July 1878. Their children were:

- Bessie Symonds Hawkes (1879– )
- Robert Glandfield "Bert" Hawkes (1881 – 5 October 1941) married to Ethel May Hawkes; they had five children, lived Magill Road, Tranmere.
- Mabel Brookes Hawkes (1884– ) had child Owen Thomas Hawkes (1905– ); father was Thomas Paterson; they married; she married James Black ( – ) in 1914, died in New Zealand.
- Ethel Frances Annie "Sissie" Hawkes (1885– ) married Ernest George Fordham on 29 April 1909, lived at Burnside
- Owen Centenous Hawkes (1888 – 28 September 1917) with 13th Machine Gun Company, died of wounds in France.
- Emily Florence Hawkes (1890–1985) married Leonard William Peglar in 1913, lived in Walkerville
- Percy John Hawkes (1894–1985) lived in Clarendon, South Australia
- Ada Preston Hawkes (1896–1980) married William Henry Mongan in 1917, lived in Leabrook.

- Elizabeth Ann Hawkes (1853 – 29 October 1939) married William Walter Humpherys (c. 1850 – 2 February 1928) in 1876. They had four children.
- James Symonds Hawkes (15 March 1856 – 11 July 1919) married Jane Codling (1859 – ) on 19 July 1878

- Elizabeth Ann Hawkes (c. 1829 – 19 August 1923) married Edward B. W. Glandfield on 14 September 1848. He was later Mayor of Adelaide.
- Charles Flaxman Hawkes (c. 1832 – 19 February 1875) married Frances Annie Johns in 1857. Killed himself with a chisel.

- George Austin Hawkes (1857–1892) married Alice Atkins Martin in 1880
- Charles Robert Hawkes (1859–1907) married Lucy Webb Fidler in 1882

- Robert Joseph Hawkes (c. 1836 – 10 October 1861)
- Jonathan Lea Hawkes (1 April 1839 – 3 July 1932) married Harriet Cook on 6 November 1863; 6 children, including:

- George Edward Hawkes (2 May 1877 – 14 August 1961) Commandant, Torrens Island Concentration Camp in 1915; later bank manager

- George W. Hawkes (c. 1842 – 3 December 1922) carried on his father's land and estate agency business after his death
