= Gilbert Dyett =

Australian soldier

Sir Gilbert Dyett
- Born: 23 June 1891; Bendigo, Victoria
- Died: 19 December 1964 (aged 73); East Melbourne, Victoria
- Military career
- Allegiance: Australia
- Branch: Australian Imperial Force
- Service years: 1914–1919
- Rank: Captain
- Unit: 7th Battalion (1915)
- Conflicts: First World War; Gallipoli campaign; Battle of Lone Pine
- Awards: Knight Bachelor; Companion of the Order of St Michael and St George
- Other work: National President, Returned Sailors' Soldiers' and Airmens' Imperial League of Australia (1919–46)

Sir Gilbert Joseph Cullen Dyett, CMG (23 June 1891 – 19 December 1964) was an Australian soldier, veterans' rights activist and National President of the Returned Sailors' Soldiers' and Airmens' Imperial League of Australia (RSSAILA; 1919–46), forerunner of the present Returned and Services League of Australia. He was succeeded as National President of the RSSAILA by Eric Millhouse.

A First World War veteran of the Gallipoli campaign, Dyett also served as Dominion President of the British Empire Services League from 1921 to 1946, and was secretary of the Victorian Trotting and Racing Association for 30 years, from 1919 to 1949. He was appointed a Companion of the Order of St Michael and St George in the 1927 Birthday Honours, and was made Knight Bachelor in 1934.

Dyett died in 1964, aged 73, following a long illness.

In 2003, a display on Dyett was created for the Eternity Hall at the National Museum of Australia. A collection of Dyett's memorabilia was unveiled in 2006 by Dyett's nephew at a dinner to celebrate the 90th anniversary of the founding of the Bendigo and District branch of the Returned Services League. The collection, normally housed in a vault, includes war medals and photographs, as well as Dyett's writings.
