= Jack Wade (footballer) =

Australian rules footballer

John Wade
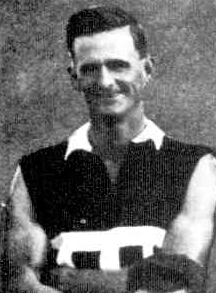

Personal information
- Full name: John Samuel Wade
- Born: 3 October 1907; Renmark, South Australia
- Died: 11 June 1941 (aged 33); Aadloun, Mandatory Lebanon
- Original team: Port Adelaide
- Height: 185 cm (6 ft 1 in)

Playing career^{1}
Years	Club	Games (Goals)
1927–1930	Port Adelaide	49 (15)
1931–1933	South Melbourne	26 (2)
- ^{1} Playing statistics correct to the end of 1933.

Career highlights
- Port Adelaide premiership player (1928)

John Samuel Wade (3 October 1907 – 11 June 1941) was an Australian rules footballer who played with Port Adelaide in the South Australian National Football League (SANFL) and South Melbourne in the Victorian Football League (VFL). Playing in Port Adelaide's premiership side in 1928, he represented South Australia on four occasions before being recruited by South Melbourne in 1930 — however, he was not granted a clearance to play for South Melbourne until 1931.

The collection of players recruited from interstate in 1932/1933 became known as South Melbourne's "Foreign Legion".

Wade also represented Victoria at badminton.

He was killed in action in Lebanon during World War II.

"In a brief and dignified ceremony before the [Grand Final between Norwood and Sturt on 4 October 1941], the big crowd stood in silence for a minute to honor [the eight] League players who have died on active service in the present war, The chairman of the League (Major E. Millhouse) told spectators that … they were L.K. Rudd (Port Adelaide), D. Waite (West Torrens), D.L. Carlos (Glenelg), H.G. Brock (Port Adelaide), A. Exley (Glenelg), H.R. Farrant (North Adelaide), L. Leahy (Norwood), and J. Wade (Port Adelaide)." -- The Chronicle, 9 October 1941.

== See also ==
- List of Victorian Football League players who died on active service
