= James S. Hawkes =

Australian civil engineer

James Symonds Hawkes (1856 – 11 July 1919) was an Australian civil engineer.

== History ==
Hawkes was born in Adelaide, a son of John Henry Mason Hawkes (c. 1827 – 14 October 1858) and his wife Frances Sarah Ann Hawkes, née Symonds (c. 1831 – 15 February 1902). Frances arrived in South Australia in February 1849 aboard the ship Marion; they married later that same year. She was in 1880 to marry again, to the recently widowed William Henville Burford.

Hawkes grew up in Port Adelaide, and at 13 was admitted to Adelaide Educational Institution, where he was dubbed "Geometry Hawkes" by his schoolmates, and whose principal, J. L. Young, was impressed by his ready grasp of complex mathematics. At a little over 16 he went to work for Robin and LeMessurier, timber merchants, of Port Adelaide, and at 18 became their accountant. The owner, Theophilus Robin, died in September 1874, and his widow brought in Theodore Hack to manage what became known as Robin & Hack. Hawkes remained with the company for ten years. Around early September 1884 he left for Silverton, where a rush was on, and tried his hand at prospecting. A few months later, presumably after much hard work for little return, he travelled overland to Sydney, where his mathematical abilities were put to good use in overseeing construction of some complex buildings that were going up. His first job was superintending the erection of the Hôtel Métropole, followed by a variety of other structures: bridges, mining plants, and other engineering work, including various jobs for the State Government. He was the first in Australia to employ giant cranes in construction of multi-storey buildings. For nearly thirty years he was one of the busiest civil engineers in New South Wales. In 1908 he qualified as a quantity surveyor, and established a private practice. In later years his activity became impaired by attacks of acute rheumatism, and after 1916 he was confined to his home, where he died from heart failure.

== Other interests ==
Hawkes is reported as playing football with the Port Adelaide Football Club, and his name is mentioned a few times as a player in 1876 and 1877, but does not appear in the club's list of post-1876 players. He was also a junior member of the Port Adelaide Chess Club.

== Family ==
John Henry Mason Hawkes (c. 1827 – 14 October 1858) married Frances Ann Symonds (c. 1831 – 15 February 1902)

- Robert Symonds Hawkes (1850–1850)
- John Henry Mason Hawkes (1851 – 5 May 1944) married Rosina Brooks (1856–1937) of Oakbank on 7 July 1878. He had own manufacturing business, then was manager of Fowler's "Lion" factory.
- Elizabeth Ann Hawkes (1853 – 29 October 1939) married William Walter Humpherys (c. 1850 – 2 February 1928) in 1876. They had four children.
- James Symonds Hawkes (15 March 1856 – 11 July 1919) married Jane Codling (1859–) on 19 July 1878

- James Symonds Hawkes (2 May 1879 – 28 April 1972) married Mary Ann in June 1899, lived at Oberon, New South Wales; served as mechanic with the Australian Flying Corps during World War I
- Willie Scott Hawkes (14 November 1880 – 1956)
- Jeannie May Frances Hawkes (19 May 1882 – 1938)
- Gladys Annie Hawkes (1884–1957)
- Herbert George Hawkes (1886–1951)
- Harold John Hawkes (1888–1971)
- Gwendoline Hawkes (1890–1969)
- Eric Oswald Hawkes (1893–1979) served with 1st Field Engineers, wounded and repatriated
- Osric Scott Hawkes (1895–1971) served in France; wounded in action and repatriated.
- Frederick J. Hawkes (1895 – 1970?)
- Walter Scott Hawkes (4 February 1898 – 10 August 1977)

He was survived by his second wife and ten [sic] children by his first.
