= Bruce Light =

Australian rules footballer

Personal information
- Full name: Bruce Malcolm Light
- Nickname: Speed of Light
- Born: 26 June 1949
- Died: 24 January 2018 (aged 68); Adelaide, South Australia
- Position: Wingman

Playing career
Years	Club	Games (Goals)
1967–1978	Port Adelaide	216 (89)

Representative team honours
Years	Team	Games (Goals)
	South Australia	4

Career highlights
- SANFL Port Adelaide premiership player (1977)

Bruce Malcolm Light (26 June 1949 – 24 January 2018) was an Australian rules footballer who played for the Port Adelaide Football Club in the South Australian National Football League (SANFL). During his career he played four games for South Australia and won a premiership with Port Adelaide in 1977.

== Career ==
Light represented Port Adelaide in 216 games from 1967 to 1978 and scored 89 goals. He was awarded Port Adelaide Life Membership in 1976. He played a pivotal role the following season in the club’s drought-breaking SANFL 1977 premiership. Light represented South Australia for four games.

== Personal life and death ==
Light died on the night of 24 January 2018 at the age of 68 after a long battle with illness. Light was farewelled at a private service. Port Adelaide honoured Light’s memory and outstanding contribution at Adelaide Oval in Round 1.

His close friend and premiership captain Russell Ebert recalls a man who was adored by Port Adelaide supporters throughout the 1970s for his electrifying speed, courage and flowing blond hair.

“Bruce was all about team success and triumph for the whole club. Along with his teammates, Bruce loved the trainers and volunteers at the club and always felt a real sense of responsibility toward the entire club and supporter base. And anyone who saw Bruce play would know he played like he carried that responsibility,” said Ebert.

“Bruce was a great friend. You often get asked about teammates you would go to war with, and I know Bruce would be the first to put his hand up to be alongside you,” said Ebert.

"Footy was a vehicle for Bruce to do other things in life that were important to him and to help others. During his career, Bruce went back to study as a mature-aged student and got a teaching degree. One of his great passions was teaching and helping the children of Ashford Special School here in Adelaide to develop and achieve their goals, and he spent more than a decade in that role."

In the book Dynasty, Port Adelaide player and coach Fos Williams described Light as a “superior footballer”.

“He was courageous, he'd wave the ball around and get away with it and was just a natural showing the skills on both sides of his body,” said Williams.
