= Wilfred Thurgarland =

Australian cricketer

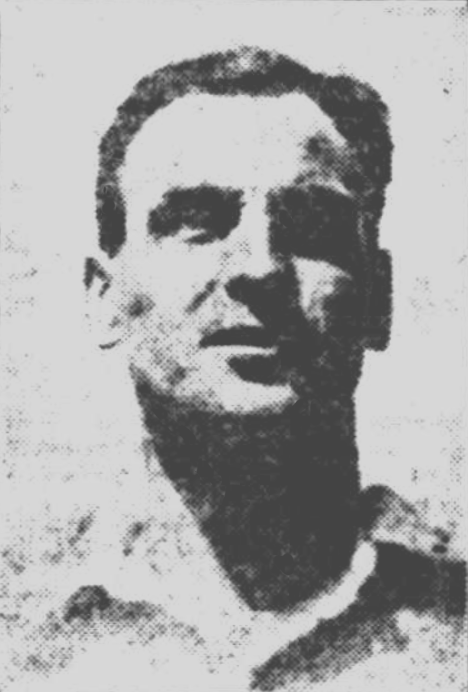

Personal information
- Full name: Wilfred John Thurgarland
- Born: 11 March 1892; Adelaide, Australia
- Died: 12 July 1974 (aged 82)
- Batting: Left-handed
- Bowling: Left fast-medium
- Source: Cricinfo, 28 September 2020

Wilfred Thurgarland (11 March 1892 – 12 July 1974) was an Australian cricketer. He played in one first-class match for South Australia in 1920/21.

== Cricket career ==
Thurgarland began his career playing matting cricket in Adelaide and earned a reputation as a good left-hand bowler which resulted in him being recruited by the Port Adelaide cricket club for the 1913/14 season. He performed well in the 1920/21 first grade season taking 27 wickets at an average of 17, and he was selected to represent South Australia against the touring English side in November 1920, however he went wicketless and did not achieve anything of note during the first-class game.

Thurgarland missed the start of the 1923/24 season, due to appendicitis but returned to playing for Port Adelaide after Christmas. In 1925 he was noted as a veteran of the Port Adelaide club having been of good service for many years. As of 1928 he was primarily playing in second grade cricket both coaching and captaining the Port Adelaide second grade side however he was selected in the first grade side in January 1928 and described as the best wet wicket bowler for Port. He retired from cricket after the 1927/28 season and Port Adelaide reported it was finding it difficult to find a captain/coach for the second grade side to replace him.

== See also ==
- List of South Australian representative cricketers
