= David Johnston (South Australia cricketer) =

Australian cricketer (born 1954)

Personal information
- Born: 14 December 1954 (age 71); Melbourne, Australia
- Source: Cricinfo, 9 August 2020

David Johnston (born 14 December 1954) is an Australian cricketer. He played in ten first-class and nineteen List A matches for South Australia between 1978 and 1990.

== See also ==
- List of South Australian representative cricketers
