= Brian Cunningham (Australian footballer) =

Australian rules footballer

Personal information
- Nickname: Bucky
- Born: 14 August 1952 (age 74); Adelaide, South Australia
- Original team: Rosewater
- Height: 175 cm (5 ft 9 in)
- Weight: 74Kg

Playing career^{1}
Years	Club	Games (Goals)
1971–1983	Port Adelaide	256 (428)
- ^{1} Playing statistics correct to the end of 1983.

Career highlights
- Port Adelaide Premiership Player 1977, 1979-81; Port Adelaide Club Captain 1979-82; 6 State games for South Australia; Port Adelaide Football Club Life Member; South Australian Football Hall of Fame Inductee 2005

Brian "Bucky" Cunningham (born 14 August 1952 in Adelaide, South Australia) is a former Australian Rules footballer in the South Australian National Football League (SANFL), playing the Port Adelaide Football Club. Cunningham was later CEO of Port Adelaide Football Club from 1992 until 2004.

Making his league debut in 1971, Cunningham played as a rover and small forward throughout his career. In 1979 Cunningham was appointed captain of Port Adelaide holding the role until 1982. Port Adelaide won 3 premierships in Cunningham's four years as captain. Cunningham retired at the end of the 1983 season, having played 256 games for Port (kicking 428 goals) and 6 games representing South Australia.

Cunningham was appointed CEO of the Port Adelaide Football Club in 1992 and was part of the club's successful bid to join the AFL. In 1997 Port Adelaide would play its first season in the AFL. Cunningham remained the Port Adelaide Football Club's CEO until his retirement following the club's first AFL premiership in 2004.

In 2005, Cunningham was inducted into the South Australian Football Hall of Fame.

Between his playing and CEO days, Cunningham worked as a high-school teacher. He was appointed chief executive of the Department of Further Education, Employment, Science & Technology (DFEEST) in South Australia in 2005.

== See also ==
- 1977 SANFL Grand Final
