= Steven Knight (footballer) =

Australian rules footballer

Personal information
- Full name: Steven Knight
- Born: 16 March 1961
- Died: 24 February 2009 (aged 47)
- Original team: Geelong College
- Height: 180 cm (5 ft 11 in)
- Weight: 76 kg (168 lb)

Playing career^{1}
Years	Club	Games (Goals)
1981–83	Footscray	17 (17)
1984–1986	Port Adelaide	42 (67)
- ^{1} Playing statistics correct to the end of 1983.

Steven Knight (16 March 1961 – 24 February 2009) was an Australian rules footballer who played with Footscray in the Victorian Football League (VFL).

Following his stint in the VFL, Knight transferred to South Australian National Football League (SANFL) club Port Adelaide where he played 42 games and kicked 67 goals from 1984 to 1986.

He died in February 2009 after a long illness.
