= Randall Gerlach =

Australian rules footballer (1953–2018)

Personal information
- Full name: Randall Gordon Gerlach
- Born: 18 March 1953
- Died: 31 August 2018 (aged 65)

Playing career
Years	Club	Games (Goals)
1971–1977	Port Adelaide	110

Career highlights
- Port Adelaide premiership player (1977); Port Adelaide leading goal-kicker (1976)

Randall Gordon Gerlach (18 March 1953 – 31 August 2018) was an Australian rules footballer for Port Adelaide. Gerlach died in 2018 following a long battle with kidney disease.
