= Max James =

Australian rules footballer

Personal information
- Full name: Max James
- Born: 27 December 1951 (age 74)
- Height: 186 cm (6 ft 1 in)
- Weight: 86 kg (190 lb)
- Position: Centre half forward

Playing career^{1}
| Years | Club | Games (Goals) |
| 1971-77, 1982–85 | Port Adelaide | 148 (152) |
| 1978–1982 | South Melbourne/Sydney | 54 (57) |
- ^{1} Playing statistics correct to the end of 1982.

Career highlights
- SANFL Premiership 1977; Simpson Medal 1977 (SA v WA in Perth)

Max James (born 27 December 1951) is a former Australian rules footballer who played for Port Adelaide in the South Australian National Football League (SANFL). He also spent 5 years in the Victorian Football League (VFL) playing for South Melbourne.

== Port Adelaide (1971–1977) ==
James started out at Port Adelaide in 1971 and was a member of their 1977 premiership team. James represented South Australia in eight interstate matches, including at the 1975 Knockout Carnival. In 1977 he was awarded a Simpson Medal for his performance in a match against Western Australia.

== South Melbourne (1978–1982) ==
James transferred to South Melbourne and made his VFL debut in the opening round of the 1978 VFL season. Known for his high flying marks, most of James's games were played from centre half forward, but he was used in various other positions during an injury-riddled stint in the league.

When South Melbourne relocated to Sydney for the 1982 VFL season, James joined them in the move but could only manage three appearances. His son Heath James would later play for the Sydney Swans.

== Port Adelaide (1982–1985) ==
James returned to Port Adelaide to finish his career.

== Political career ==
James ran as an independent candidate at the 2010 South Australian state election in the House of Assembly seat of Port Adelaide held by Rann Labor Treasurer Kevin Foley. In a candidate field of five, James came third receiving 11 percent of the vote.
