= David Granger (footballer) =

Australian rules footballer (1955–2024)

Personal information
- Full name: David Phillip Granger
- Nickname: Grave Danger
- Born: 23 January 1955
- Died: 7 March 2024 (aged 69)
- Height: 188 cm (6 ft 2 in)
- Weight: 92 kg (203 lb)

Playing career^{1}
Years	Club	Games (Goals)
1975–1982	Port Adelaide	103 (92)
1979	St Kilda	3 (1)
- ^{1} Playing statistics correct to the end of 1982.

Career highlights
- 2x Port Adelaide premiership player 1977, 1981

David Phillip Granger (23 January 1955 – 7 March 2024) was an Australian rules footballer who played for the Port Adelaide Football Club in the South Australian National Football League (SANFL) and St Kilda Football Club in the Victorian Football League (VFL).

== Career ==
=== St Kilda (U19s) ===
David Granger commenced his football career in Victoria where he played trial games with St Kilda.

=== Port Adelaide ===
Granger played for Port Adelaide Football Club in the SANFL between 1975 and 1982. He was a strong, skilled and effective footballer, becoming famously known by his spoonerism nickname, 'Grave Danger'. This was during an era of unprecedented violence in the game and Granger was often employed as an on-field hitman. Over the years he handed out and received countless injuries on the field. Although he played nominally as a forward, Granger was often sent into defence to harass opposition star forwards. Opposition players often found themselves fearing Granger instead of concentrating on the game, a situation Port Adelaide exploited.

In the 1977 Grand Final Granger played a pivotal role as centre half-forward in Port's 8-point victory over Glenelg.

In the 1981 Grand Final, also against Glenelg, Granger ended the career of Neville 'Twiggy' Caldwell with a premeditated King hit. As there is no send-off rule in Australian Rules football, Granger continued in the game to lead Port to a 51-point victory. After the match Glenelg protested which resulted in Granger becoming the first footballer in the SANFL to be suspended on video evidence. Granger was later to claim he initially believed Caldwell had died and was "terrified" by what he had done.

In the 1982 preliminary final Port were trailing by 26 points in the second quarter against Glenelg. Port coach John Cahill sent Granger onto the field in the 21st minute of the quarter whereupon Granger was reported by a goal umpire after he King hit Graham Cornes knocking him down as soon as they matched up. Cornes recovered quickly and was awarded a free kick. Cornes was later to blatantly push Granger in the back but the umpire refused to award a free kick. In the third quarter Glenelg back pocket Stephen Barratt had his right leg broken in a "collision" with Granger (which Granger claims was an accident, though he wasn't sorry that Barratt broke his leg) and Peter Maynard received a bleeding eardrum. Although credited with only one kick and two marks, Granger reportedly had an "eerie" effect on the game with not only Glenelg players hesitant to match him for fear of missing the final but considerable abuse from the crowd.

Port eventually lost the match by one point. As Cahill walked down the stairs of the members' stand he was jeered by the Glenelg supporters in the crowd of 32,339 and Granger had to be escorted from the oval by police. Granger was subsequently suspended for 8 weeks for the Cornes incident and another two for his collision with Barratt which ended his own career. While Granger later claimed that he was sent out to hit Cornes, John Cahill claimed there was no such order and with his career over, Granger felt betrayed by the lack of an admission by Cahill. Cornes for his part has never accepted any apology for the incident (though he has forgiven him), still remembers it bitterly and feels there was no doubt Granger was sent out to target him by the coaching staff.

=== St Kilda (VFL) ===
During 1979, Granger played three games for St Kilda in the Victorian Football League, kicking one goal.

=== Post-retirement ===
After retiring from Port Adelaide, Granger moved to Port Pirie to play for Solomontown in the Spencer Gulf Football League. His first game drew a record attendance.

In December 2007 Granger was interviewed for the Today Tonight program "SA's (20) greatest sporting controversies" where his career was listed at number seven. He claimed he was often ordered to take players out, explaining "I was a good soldier. I did what I was told.....the culture of football at the time was to win at all costs". He insists that the Barratt incident was one of the few times an injury he caused really was an accident. Granger maintains that he was going for the ball when Barratt collided with him. He also recounted how his "exile" by Port Adelaide after his retirement caused depression and eventually led to an incident where he broke into the Port Adelaide locker room at Alberton Oval and attempted suicide by his old locker. The program's co-compere, Graham Cornes, who was on the receiving end of Granger's playing style in 1982, finished the segment by saying he had forgiven him, commenting, "That's Football".

Granger died on 7 March 2024, at the age of 69.

== Off-field controversy ==
Granger had struggled off field for a number of years and it was revealed in his court appearances that he battles depression. On 26 December 2001, Granger informed the media that his house would be repossessed by St George Bank who had lodged documents to this effect with the Supreme Court. He had borrowed $93,000 in 1991 to buy the then-$150,000 house.

In 2003 Granger was finally sentenced to jail after being found guilty of knowingly having cannabis in his possession for the purpose of selling it after 17kg of cannabis had been found by police in his home. He was sentenced to four years and three months imprisonment. Granger had three previous convictions for cannabis offences in 1991, 1998 and 2002.

In 2015 Granger was convicted of assault against MP Michael Atkinson.

== See also ==
- 1977 SANFL Grand Final
