= Tommy Quinn =

Australian rules footballer and coach

Tom Quinn
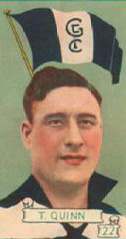

Personal information
- Full name: Thomas James Quinn
- Nicknames: Maggie, Tommy
- Born: 11 August 1908; Birkenhead, South Australia
- Died: 11 November 1969 (aged 61); Rockbank, Victoria
- Height: 169 cm (5 ft 7 in)
- Weight: 80 kg (176 lb)

Playing career^{1}
Years	Club	Games (Goals)
1928–1930	Port Adelaide	59
1931–1940	Geelong	168 (169)
Total		227 (169)

Coaching career
Years	Club	Games (W–L–D)
1946–1948	Geelong	57 (22–35–0)
- ^{1} Playing statistics correct to the end of 1940.

Career highlights
- Port Adelaide premiership side 1928; Geelong best and fairest 1936, 1937; Geelong premiership side 1931, 1937; Geelong Team of the Century (emergency)

Thomas James Quinn (11 August 1908 – 11 November 1969) was a leading Australian rules footballer of the 1920s and 1930s, playing for Port Adelaide Football Club and Geelong Football Club.

Born in Birkenhead, South Australia, the son of former Port Adelaide captain John Quinn, Sr. and the older brother of dual Magarey Medallist Bob, Quinn showed aptitude for football from a young age, and standing 170 cm tall and built like a tank, Quinn made his South Australian National Football League (SANFL) debut for Port as a rover in 1928. Quinn immediately made his mark, becoming a key member of the 1928 Port premiership team. Quinn played 59 matches for Port in three seasons plus six for South Australia before finding himself unemployed in the wake of the Great Depression.

Quinn had attracted interest from Victorian Football League (VFL) clubs at the 1930 Adelaide Carnival with his performances for South Australia, and when Geelong offered Quinn employment with the Ford Motor Company, a club sponsor, as a machine operator, Quinn leapt at the opportunity and transferred to Geelong for the 1931 VFL season. Gaining the nickname "Maggie" for his Port Adelaide heritage, Quinn immediately proved a success in the VFL, being a key player in Geelong's 1931 premiership team and became a firm favorite with Geelong fans.

Quinn won Geelong's best and fairest awards in 1936 and 1937 and was appointed club vice-captain for the 1937 season, captaining Geelong for seven matches when captain Reg Hickey was injured. Quinn capped off 1937 with a best on ground performance in Geelong's 1937 Grand Final win, gaining 31 possessions and six marks in a performance considered "completely error free".

Quinn retired early in the 1940 season after having been dropped to the reserves. He had played 168 games for Geelong, kicking 169 goals. In 1946 Quinn was appointed coach of Geelong but was sacked from the position at the end of the 1948 season after failing to raise Geelong above 7th place.

In 2001 Quinn was selected as an Emergency in Geelong's official 'Team of the Century'.
