= Eric Millhouse =

Australian lawyer

Colonel Sir Eric William John Millhouse (26 December 1891 – 24 February 1950) was a South Australian lawyer, noted for his work for returned servicemen.

== History ==
Millhouse was born at Mount Gambier, a son of Joseph Edward Millhouse and his wife Mary Jane Millhouse, née Mahood. He was educated at the Port Pirie school and subsequently Prince Alfred College. He graduated LLB at the University of Adelaide University in March 1915, serving his articles with Young, Newland, & Ward, then worked as managing clerk for Francis "Frank" Villeneuve Smith, and was admitted to the Bar in the following month. He remained with Smith until 1916, when he joined the Crown Law Office and in 1921 succeeded Shierlaw as Crown Prosecutor, becoming the youngest in the history of Australia.

== Returned servicemen ==
Millhouse enlisted with the 1st AIF in September 1914, serving as a gunner with the 8th Battery in France, in July 1919 promoted to sergeant librarian. Soon after his return from the front, he received a commission in the Legal Corps and served as a part-time officer until placed on the retired list in 1949. He was State president of the RSL from 1942 to 1944, then elected Federal president in 1946, the second to hold the post after G. J. C. Dyett. He pushed energetically for preference in employment and rehabilitation for returned World War II servicemen.

== Other activities ==
- In February 1933 he succeeded Sir Frank Moulden on the district staff of the St. John Ambulance Brigade.
- He was chairman of the Police Appeal Board for some time, replacing W. R. Kelly SM in July 1933, replaced in 1950 by E. L. Bean.
- He was elected unopposed as chairman of the SA National Football League in March 1940, he was re-elected in February 1946, for a further term.
- He was a keen lacrosse player, and represented South Australia in interstate matches.
- In May 1936 he was elected president of the SA Amateur Billiards Association.

== Recognition ==
- In 1933 he was appointed an honorary Special Magistrate by Executive Council
- Millhouse was appointed KC in September 1945
- Millhouse was knighted in the 1950 New Year's list.

Among prominent RSL officials who attended his funeral were the acting Federal president G. W. Holland, the Federal secretary James Clarence "Jim" Neagle of the RSL, and the Minister for the Army, Josiah Francis, flew in from interstate to be present. Tributes were read from the Governor, Sir Willoughby Norrie, the Premier, Tom Playford, and the State president of the RSL Arthur S. Blackburn, VC.

== Family ==
Joseph Edward Millhouse ( –1920) married Mary Jane Mahood ( –1944) in 1884. Their family included:

- Dr. Ernest J. Millhouse (1885–1948), North Terrace dentist
- Eric Millhouse married Marjorie Franklin Wald (1892–1955) in 1906. They had a home on LeFevre Terrace, North Adelaide

- Ian Wald "Billy" Millhouse (1920–1943)

- Vivian Rhodes Millhouse (1902–1963), also a lawyer

- Robin Millhouse, lawyer and politician
