= Trevor Sorrell =

Australian rules footballer (born 1951)

Personal information
- Born: 27 October 1951 (age 75); Owen, South Australia
- Positions: Half forward, full-back

Playing career
Years	Club	Games (Goals)
1970–1974, 1977–1981	Port Adelaide	235 (219)
1975–1976	Clarence	

Representative team honours
Years	Team	Games (Goals)
	South Australia	2
1976	Tasmania	1

Coaching career
Years	Club	Games (W–L–D)
1975–1976	Clarence	

Career highlights
- 3x Port Adelaide premiership player (1977,1979,1980); William Leitch Medallist (1976)

Trevor Sorrell (b. 27 October 1951) is a former Australian rules footballer who played for Port Adelaide in the South Australian National Football League (SANFL) and Clarence in the Tasmanian State League (TSL).
