= Reg Conole =

Australian rules footballer

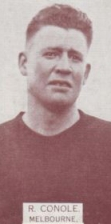

Personal information
- Full name: Reginald Eric Conole
- Born: 23 April 1902
- Died: 4 January 1967 (aged 64)
- Original team: Gladstone
- Height: 174 cm (5 ft 9 in)
- Weight: 71 kg (157 lb)
- Positions: Half-back, ruck

Playing career^{1}
Years	Club	Games (Goals)
1926–1929	Port Adelaide	61 (44)
1930–1933	Melbourne	47 (6)

Representative team honours
Years	Team	Games (Goals)
	South Australia	1
- ^{1} Playing statistics correct to the end of 1933.

Reginald Conole (23 April 1902 – 4 January 1967) was an Australian rules footballer who played with Port Adelaide in the South Australian National Football League (SANFL) and Melbourne in the Victorian Football League (VFL).

Conole, who was from Gladstone, had a late start to his league career, already 24 when he first started playing for Port Adelaide in 1926. He played his football across half-back or in the ruck and was also a cricketer with the Port Adelaide Cricket Club.

In 1928 he played in Port Adelaide's premiership winning team and missed a chance of going back-to-back the following year when an injury cost him a place in the decider.

Although he joined Melbourne in 1930, the injury kept him out of the side until round nine, but he only missed two more games for the rest of the year. He remained with Melbourne for three more seasons.

He represented South Australia at interstate football on one occasion.
