= 1939 SANFL Grand Final =

Port Adelaide	West Torrens
16.28 (124)	11.11 (77)
	1	2	3	4
PTA	2.11 (23)	8.18 (66)	14.23 (107)	16.28 (124)
WT	1.0 (6)	5.1 (31)	7.5 (47)	11.11 (77)
- Date: Saturday, 30 September (2:10 pm)
- Stadium: Adelaide Oval
- Attendance: 44,885

The 1939 SANFL Grand Final was an Australian rules football competition. Port Adelaide beat West Torrens 124 to 77.
