= Darrell Cahill =

Australian rules footballer and golfer

Personal information
- Full name: Darrell Cahill
- Born: 4 April 1949 (age 77); Adelaide, South Australia
- Original team: Seaton Ramblers
- Height: 180 cm (5 ft 11 in)
- Weight: 81 kg (179 lb)
- Position: Rover

Playing career^{1}
| Years | Club | Games (Goals) |
| 1969–1982 | Port Adelaide | 263 (375) |

Representative team honours
| Years | Team | Games (Goals) |
| | South Australia | 8 |
- ^{1} Playing statistics correct to the end of 1982.

Career highlights
- SANFL: 4 x Port Adelaide premiership player (1977, 1979, 1980, 1981); Port Adelaide leading goal-kicker (1974); SANFL Grand Final best on ground (1979); 5 xPort Adelaide Football Club best and fairest runner up.; Port Adelaide Football Club best finals player 1977; Domestic golf: 1 x Club Champion at North Adelaide Golf Club; 4 x Club champion at Riverside Golf Club; 2 x Golf champion of champions (1967,1988); 1 x South Australia State golf foursomes champion; 1 x South Australia state golf champion (1989)

Darrell Cahill is a former Australian rules footballer and golfer.

Cahill played with the Port Adelaide Football Club in the South Australian National Football League (SANFL). He is brother of John Cahill, cousin to Barrie Barbary, nephew of Laurie Cahill and uncle to Darren Cahill. During his time at Port Adelaide he won four premierships and was declared best on ground during the club's 1979 victory. He was the only player nominated in three different positions in Port Adelaide Football Club squad of 40 greatest ever players, being nominated as a small forward, midfielder and defender. He was runner up in Port Adelaide Football Club best and fairest 5 times. He had the most disposals in the league 3 times in his career.

Cahill was an accomplished golfer winning the North Adelaide Golf Club championship in 1967 and then went on to represent the state in junior and senior events. His first handicap was 4 and he got that down to scratch in his first year of golf. He was quoted on the front page of the Perth player as the best first year player Norman Von Nida had ever seen. In 1969 Cahill represented South Australia and played against Western Australia, Tasmania, Victoria and Queensland. His only loss was to Jack Newton. After his career in the SANFL he returned to golf in 1983 and played until 1989 winning four more club championships, this time at Riverside Golf Club. He won a Champion of Champions at The Grange Golf Club and in 1989 he again represented South Australia and also won the state championship the same year which was played at Kooyonga Golf Club.
