= Kym Kinnear =

Australian rules footballer

Personal information
- Full name: Kym Kinnear
- Nickname: Kimmy
- Born: 8 March 1956 (age 70)
- Original team: Rosewater
- Height: 173 cm (5 ft 8 in)
- Weight: 76 kg (168 lb)
- Position: Wingman

Playing career
Years	Club	Games (Goals)
1973–1984, 1986	Port Adelaide	272 (125)

Career highlights
- 3× SANFL premiership player (1977, 1980, 1981)

Kym Kinnear is a former Australian rules footballer who played for the Port Adelaide Football Club in the South Australian National Football League (SANFL), in his time with Port Adelaide, he won three premierships.
