= John Quinn Sr. =

Australian rules footballer

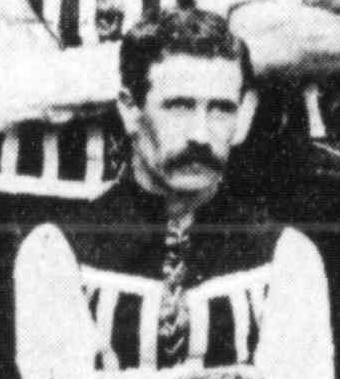
- John Quinn Sr in 1895.

Personal information
- Full name: John Michael Quinn Sr.
- Nickname: Jack
- Born: 1 November 1875
- Died: 5 August 1954 (aged 78)
- Original team: Semaphore Central

Playing career
| Years | Club | Games (Goals) |
| 1894 | Port Adelaide | |
| 1895–1899 | White Feather | |
| 1900–1908 | Port Adelaide | 116 (85) |

Representative team honours
| Years | Team | Games (Goals) |
| 1901, 1904 | South Australia | 3 |

Career highlights
- Port Adelaide premiership player (1906); SAFA leading goalkicker (1907); 2× Port Adelaide leading goal kicker (1901, 1907); 2× Port Adelaide best and fairest (1900, 1905)

John Michael Quinn Sr. (died 5 August 1954) was an Australian rules footballer for the Port Adelaide Football Club, captaining the club from 1904 to 1905.

== Early life ==
John was the eldest of 7 children born to Michael Quinn and Mary Sidoli.

== Junior football ==
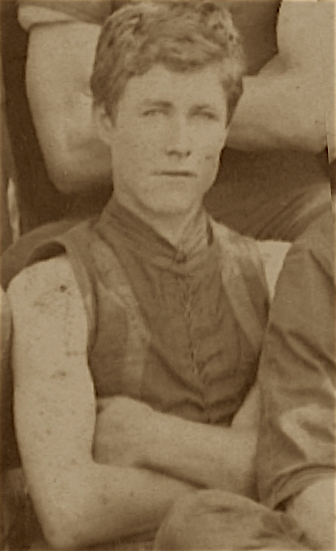
John as a junior at Semaphore Central around 1890.

John began playing for local club Semaphore Central in the early 1890s.

== Goldfields (1895–1899) ==
In 1895 John left for the Western Australian Goldfields for employment. During his years in Western Australia he played in the strong Goldfields competition for Kanowna Football Club (known as White Feather).

== Return to Port Adelaide ==
John returned home and began playing for Port Adelaide around 1900.

== Personal life ==
John Quinn Sr. was the father of future league footballers John Quinn Jr, Tom, Bob, and George. Both Tom and Bob Quinn would win premierships with Port Adelaide. Tom Quinn would later play for Geelong and is honoured in their team of the century. Likewise Bob Quinn is honoured in Port Adelaide's team of the century.
