= NWS (TV station) =

- Adelaide, South Australia; Australia
- Channels: Digital: 8 (VHF); Virtual: 9
- Branding: Nine

Programming
- Language: English
- Affiliations: Nine

Ownership
- Owner: Nine Entertainment; (Channel 9 South Australia Pty Ltd)

History
- First air date: 5 September 1959
- Former channel number: Analog: 9 (VHF) (1959–2013)
- Call sign meaning: The News (S for South Australia)

Technical information
- Licensing authority: Australian Communications & Media Authority
- ERP: 50 kW
- HAAT: 505 m
- Transmitter coordinates: 34°58′57″S 138°42′30″E

Links
- Website: 9now.com.au

NWS is an Australian television station based in Adelaide, Australia. It is owned-and-operated by the Nine Network. The station callsign, NWS, is an initialism of The NeWs South Australia.

== History ==
=== Origins ===
NBN Limited (1981)
Entity	Share
Lamb Family	35.02%
Wansey Family	30.14%
Hadjoin Pty Ltd	19.88%
Others	14.96%

NWS-9 was the first television broadcaster in Adelaide, beginning on 5 September 1959 from their Tynte Street studios. It was owned by Rupert Murdoch's News Limited through Southern Television Corporation Limited who also owned city newspaper The News. Popular programs produced in its early days included the live variety shows Adelaide Tonight and Hey Hey It's Saturday (on-location specials), science show The Curiosity Show, The Country and Western Hour, and children's shows Channel Niners, C'mon Kids, Here's Humphrey and Pick Your Face. NWS also broadcast South Australian National Football League game matches from 1989 to 1992, earlier it had produced the first ever colour broadcast of that league's Grand Final in 1973.

In early 1980, NBN Limited became NWS's owner for A$19 million. In 1981, Hadjoin Pty. Ltd., a subsidiary of Kevin Parry's Esplanade Limited, purchased 19.88% of NBN Limited for $6.7 million.

Following this, Parry then attempted to buy the Wansey family's stake in NBN, but was blocked by the Supreme Court of New South Wales, after which Parry revealed that he wanted to take over NBN (and thus NWS). Parry and the Lamb family then formed a deal – NBN would transfer NWS to the Lambs in exchange for their share of NBN which went to the Parrys. This ended NBN Limited's ownership of NWS.

=== Recent history ===
The Lamb family sold NWS to Southern Cross Broadcasting for $96 million in 1999, leading to redundancies among almost half of the station's staff.

On 30 May 2007, Southern Cross announced its sale of NWS-9 to WIN Corporation for $105 million. WIN took control on 1 July 2007.

It was reported on 3 June 2013 that Nine Entertainment would immediately purchase Nine Adelaide (NWS) from WIN Corporation as part of a deal to secure international cricket television rights. Nine officially gained control of NWS on 1 July 2013. This move saw Nine Adelaide join Brisbane, Sydney and Melbourne as Nine Network owned-and-operated metropolitan stations leaving only Perth which was purchased only months later in September.

Managing Director of Nine Adelaide, Sean O'Brien, announced in late 2014 that within two years, the station would move from its Tynte Street location of over 50 years to new studios in the CBD.

The final broadcast from the Tynte Street studios was on 18 September 2015, followed a day later by the first transmission from the new street-level studios on Pirie Street.

== Programming ==
=== Current in-house productions ===
- Nine News (Adelaide edition)
- Hello SA (2022–present)
- Building Ideas (Adelaide edition)

=== Previous in-house productions ===
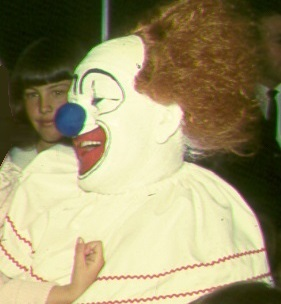
Bobo the Clown, on Channel Niners

- Adelaide Tonight
- The Curiosity Show
- C'mon Kids
- The Country and Western Hour
- Channel Niners
- Here's Humphrey
- Pick Your Face
- Postcards
- Out of the Blue
- Garden Gurus SA
- Building Ideas
- Feeling Good
- Out of the Ordinary

== News ==
Nine News Adelaide is presented from the studios of NWS Adelaide by Kate Collins and Brenton Ragless on weeknights with Will McDonald presenting on weekends. Sport is presented mostly in the studio by Tom Rehn on weekdays and by Corey Norris on weekends, with the weather presented by Jessica Braithwaite on weeknights and Chelsea Carey on the weekend.

=== News history ===
John Doherty was the station's first news presenter.

Between 1988 and 2007, the weeknight bulletin was presented by Rob Kelvin and Kevin Crease. They were one of the longest serving news duos in Australia.

Throughout the 1990s, Deanna Williams was the main fill-in presenter and state political reporter. Following her resignation in March 2002, either Kelvin or Crease would fill in for McGuinness on weekends, but in 2005 the situation arose where all three presenters were unavailable – leaving weekend sports presenter Mark Bickley to read the news.

Also during this time, the weekend bulletins consistently rated higher than its rival Seven News Adelaide in its timeslot, however, the weeknight bulletins continue to languish in second position behind Seven.

In late 2008, NWS-9 launched its own local version of the Nine Network's flagship current affairs program, A Current Affair, hosted by Adelaide journalist Kate Collins. It was axed only one year later.

On 26 November 2009, one day after the axing of the local A Current Affair was announced, Kelly Nestor announced live on air that her contract as Kelvin's weeknight co-anchor would not be renewed and she would finish on 18 December 2009.

On 22 February 2010, it was announced that senior reporter Michael Smyth would be joining Rob Kelvin at the newsdesk.

On 31 October 2010, Rob Kelvin announced that he would retire from the newsdesk after 32 years on the air. He would present his last bulletin on 31 December 2010 after 27 years anchoring the news. However, News Director, Tony Agars announced that Kelvin would continue to present the occasional special report and fill-in a few times a year when required. Kate Collins replaced Kelvin, joining Smyth at the news desk.

In October 2011, it was announced that Michael Smyth and Georgina McGuinness would not have their contracts renewed. From the end of November 2011 until December 2013, Kate Collins presented the bulletin solo on weeknights and Will McDonald replaced McGuinness as presenter for weekend bulletins at the end of December 2011.

Despite the national dominance of Nine News for many years, the Adelaide bulletin has failed to match the same ratings success seen in Sydney, Melbourne and Brisbane, and remains the lowest-rating news program in its market, formerly trailing rival Seven News Adelaide by around 100,000 viewers. This is reflected in the frequent position changes that have taken place at NWS over the years since it last won the local ratings in 2007.

=== Presenters and reporters ===
News presenters

- Brenton Ragless (Weeknights, 2014–present)
- Will McDonald (Weekends, 2011–present)

Sports presenters

- Tom Rehn (Weekends, 2015–2022, Weekdays, 2022–present)
- Corey Norris (Weekends, 2022–present)

Weather presenters

- Jessica Braithwaite (Weeknights, 2016–present)
- Chelsea Carey (Weekends, 2019–present)

News reporters

- Ben Avery
- Alice Monfries
- Ollie Haig
- Kelly Hughes
- Inga Neilsen
- Beth Excell
- Shannen McDonald
- Michaela Komarek
- Dylan Smith
- Will Di Fulvio
- April Cretan
- Samantha Hogan
- Gus Macdonald
- Josephine Shannon

Sport reporters

- Tom Rehn
- Corey Norris
- Jack Berketa
- Will Crouch
- Josh Money
- Vicki Schwarz
- Emma Henderson

=== Notable past presenters ===
- Caroline Ainslie – Weeknight Presenter, 1977–1987 (Now Retired)
- Elise Baker – broke the news of Phil Walsh's death on Today in July 2015 (now a reporter on Seven News Adelaide)
- Sue Baron – Meteorologist, 1970s (Moved to ADS-7, later ADS-10 in 1980s as News Presenter. Now Retired)
- Mark Bickley – Weekend Sports, 2004–2009 (Now co-host of the afternoon Sports Show on talk-back radio station FiveAA)
- James Brayshaw – Sports Reporter, 2002 (Now a commentator for the Seven Network)
- Jarrad Brevi – Now with Nine News Sydney
- Nona Burden – Presenter/Reporter, 1970s–1980s
- Grant Cameron – Weekend Weather Presenter, 1979–1980s (Now with SAS)
- Roger Cardwell – Weeknight Presenter, 1974–1983 (Now retired)
- Jeremy Cordeaux – Cordeaux's Adelaide 1980s
- Kate Collins – Weeknights Presenter, 2011–2025
- Kevin Crease – Weeknight Presenter, 1960s–1974 and 1987–2007 (Deceased)
- Steve Cropper – Presenter/Reporter, 1980s
- K. G. Cunningham – Weekend Sports Presenter, 1975–2003 (Now with SAS)
- Joel Dry – Reporter, 2009–2011 (now with Nine News Brisbane)
- Tony Curtis – Presenter/Reporter, 1970s–1980s
- Troy Gray – Weekend Sports Presenter, 2008–2012
- John Doherty – Presenter, 1959–1960s (Now Retired)
- Sue Ellbourne – Weather, 1970s
- Georgina McGuinness – Weekend Presenter, 1987–2011
- Michael Smyth – Weeknight Presenter, 2008–2011
- Warren Tredrea – Weeknights Sports Presenter, 2013–2021
- Sue Garrard – Presenter/Reporter 1980s
- Clive Hale – Presenter, 1970s (Went on to become national anchor for the ABC, now deceased.)
- Paris Martin – Reporter (now with 10 News Queensland)
- Keith Martyn – Weather, 1996–2007 (Retired, does occasional special news stories)
- Xavier Minniecon – Weekend Weather, 1997–2011
- Ray McGhee – Senior Reporter, 1979–2007 (Owns Mortgage Broker business and formerly an independent candidate in the 2010 Australian federal election in the seat of Boothby)
- Kelly Nestor – Weeknight Presenter, 2007–2009 (Now with AdelaideNOW)
- Barry Pitman – Weather, 1981–1996
- John Riddell – Weekend Presenter/Senior Reporter, 1981–1989 (Chief Presenter at SAS, Retired)
- Eliza Rugg – Reporter (now with Nine News Melbourne)
- Rob Kelvin – Weekday Presenter, 1979–2010 (current stand-in presenter)
- Jessica Rich – Presenter/Reporter, 2001–2004
- Peter Sellen
- Deanna Williams – Presenter/Senior Reporter/State Political Reporter, 1990–2002 (Now Senior Reporter at Seven News Adelaide)
- Anne Wills – Weather, 1960s (Moved on to other networks hosting various programs. Became known as Ms Adelaide.Now retired)
- Kym Dillon – Sports Reporter/Weeknight then Weekend Sports Presenter, 1991–2015 (Made redundant)
- Virginia Langeberg – Weeknight Weather Presenter 2014–2015

=== News bulletin titles ===
- NWS-9 News, Sport and Weather (1959–1965)
- Channel 9 News (1960s–early 1970s)
- National Nine News (early 1970s, 1976–1980, 1987–2008)
- Nine Eyewitness News (1974–1976)
- Nine Action News (1981–1986)
- Nine News (2008–present)
