= K. G. Cunningham =

Australian radio personality, and former sportsman

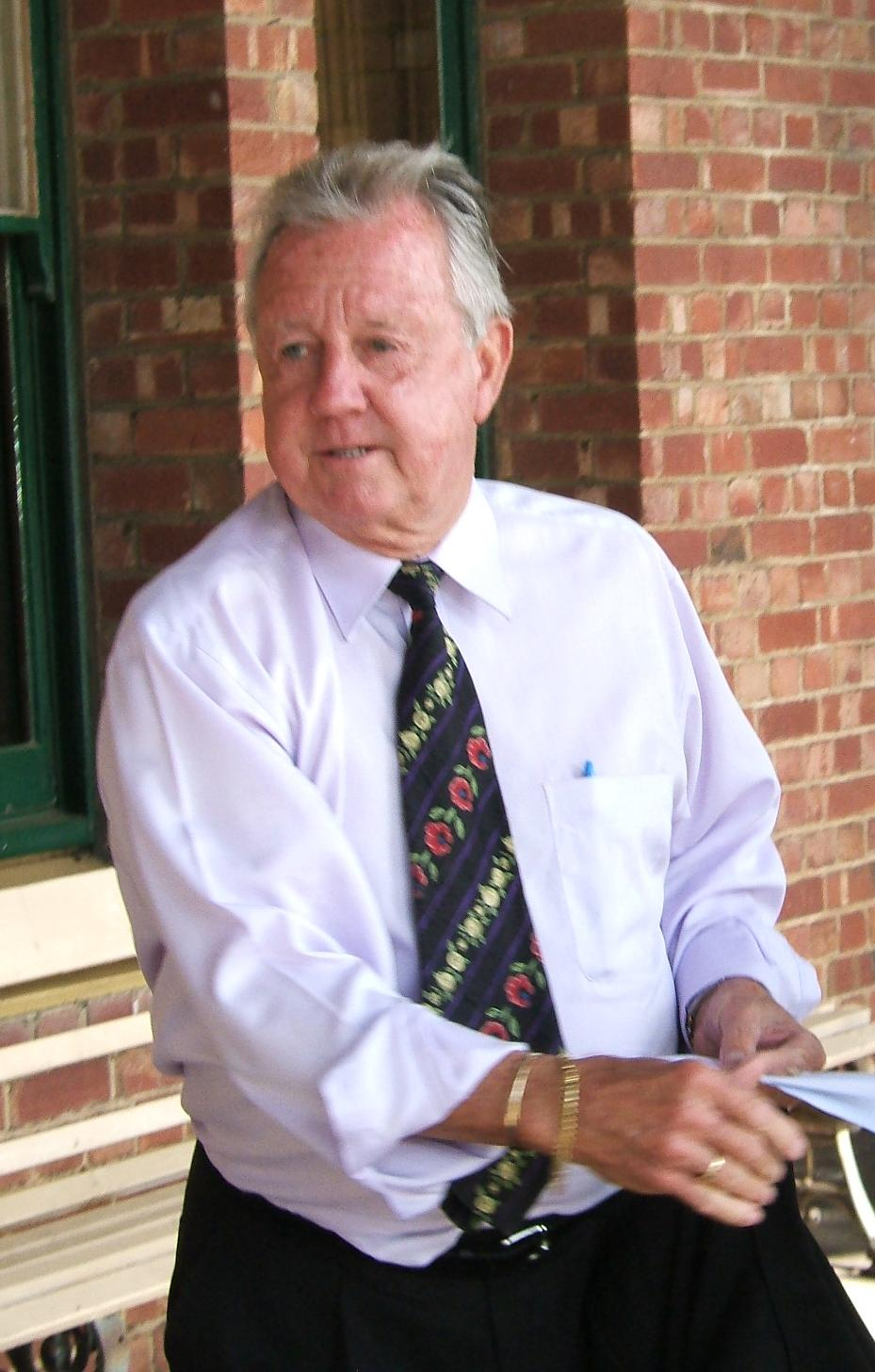

Personal information
- Full name: Kenneth George Cunningham
- Born: 26 July 1939 (age 87); Adelaide, South Australia
- Batting: Left-handed
- Bowling: Right-arm Medium

Domestic team information
- Years: Team
- 1960/61–1974/75: South Australia

Career statistics
Competition	FC	LA
Matches	97	8
Runs scored	5,497	180
Batting average	37.14	25.71
100s/50s	9/29	0/2
Top score	203	87
Balls bowled	4,242	261
Wickets	50	10
Bowling average	30.00	18.30
5 wickets in innings	0	0
10 wickets in match	0	0
Best bowling	3/16	3/20
Catches/stumpings	66/–	0/–
- Source: Cricket Archive, 30 March 2009

Kenneth George (KG) Cunningham AM (born 26 July 1939 in Adelaide, South Australia) is an Australian radio personality, and a former cricketer and football umpire.

== Sporting career ==
Cunningham had a first-class cricket career from the 1960/61 to 1973/74 seasons with the South Australian state cricket team in the Sheffield Shield. A left-hand batsman, he was part of the sides that won the Shield in 1963–64 and 1968–69, and went on to play 97 first-class matches in a solid career, averaging 37 with the bat. He was the SA team captain in 7 matches from 1971 to 1973. He toured New Zealand in 1966–67 with the Australian team captained by Les Favell.

Cunningham was also a highly rated football umpire, officiating in four SANFL grand finals and three interstate games during his 130 games in seven years (1961–1967) at the top level.

== Media career ==
Following his sport career, he became a TV and radio sports presenter. During the 1980s, KG hosted a 30-minute football wrap-up show on Channel 9 Adelaide called KG's Footy Show. The show was run on Saturdays during the football season and ran in the 5:30–6pm time slot. KG and guests who included players usually from the day's winning teams in the SANFL, would give their comments and show highlights of the games. KG was also the weekend sports presenter for Channel 9 news in Adelaide for over 20 years until he joined Channel 7 in 2005. For his long TV service to football, the SANFL inducted him into their Hall of Fame in 2012.

He also co-hosted the FIVEaa Sports Show from the mid-1980s until 2008, firstly with former South Australian cricket captain David Hookes and later with former SANFL player and Adelaide Crows (AFL) coach Graham Cornes. The radio show was among Adelaide's most popular drive time shows.

In the 1990 Australia Day Honours Cunningham was made a Member of the Order of Australia (AM) for "service to the media, particularly as a sporting broadcaster".

Cunningham collapsed from ischaemic heart disease in October 2006, and underwent angioplasty.

He is frequently very opinionated and pro-South Australian. Because of this reputation and his mannerisms, he was often satirised by fellow broadcaster Jon Blake on a weekly comedy skit called Behind Closed Doors (also broadcast on FIVEaa). One well-known incident, which typified Cunningham's broadcast style, took place in 1998 during the AFL fixture when Port Adelaide Football Club played West Coast Eagles at Football Park. During the match, then-Port Adelaide ruckman Darryl Poole marked the football on the goal line, entitling him to a set shot on goal, just metres from the target. Despite this, he was positioned at a difficult angle to take the shot, and was not known as a reliable kick. When Graham Cornes expressed doubts as to whether Poole would convert his shot into a goal, Cunningham exclaimed "If Darryl Poole misses this, I'll jump into the lake" (presumably the West Lakes outside of Football Park). Poole subsequently missed his shot, but despite every attempt during and after the match to make him act on his pledge, Cunningham refused, claiming it to be a "figure of speech".

In March 2009, Cunningham joined former Australian basketball legend Phil Smyth to host an internet sports show, "KG and the General", on australialivetv.com. Cunningham and other sporting personalities lost money owed when australialivetv.com collapsed in December 2010. Since January 2019, Cunningham has presented Saturday Sports Show on Adelaide's 5AA with Graham Cornes.

== See also ==
- List of South Australian representative cricketers
