= Humphrey Bear =

Humphrey Bear may refer to:

- Humphrey the Bear, a 1950s Disney character that appears in several animation shorts
- Humphrey B. Bear, a long-time Australian children's television series and its namesake character
