= Fat Cat and Friends =

Australian children's television series

- Genre: Children's television show
- Written by: Murray George; Channel 10
- Presented by: John Oster; Jane Reilly; Lynn Weston; Patsy Biscoe (music)
- Country of origin: Australia
- Original language: English
- No. of seasons: 16 (SAS-10); 5 (SAS-7)

Production
- Running time: 30 minutes

Original release
- Network: Network Ten (SAS-10) (1972–1987); Seven Network (SAS-7 and TVW-7) (1988–1991)
- Release: 1972 – 27 December 1991

Related
- The Early Birds; The Book Place

Fat Cat and Friends is an Australian children's television show starring Fat Cat (full name: Frederick Alphonso Tubsy Cat or Francis Aloysius Tom Cat), a costumed character, who is an orange/ginger anthropomorphic cat who wears red braces, a blue bow tie and a green bowler hat and striped socks. The show ran from 1972 to 1991, after which it was cancelled in controversial circumstances. However the Fat Cat character continues to feature on television in Perth, as the mascot of the Telethon fundraising organisation.

== Overview ==
Following the cancellation of The Magic Circle Club, actor/writer Max Bartlett continued to work in television production, moving to Western Australia, where he helped to develop the character of Fat Cat and the children's series, The Underground Video Show.

The show is similar in concept to the Nine Network's Here's Humphrey featuring Humphrey B. Bear. The program featured resident music artist Patsy Biscoe, and was variously hosted by John Oster, Jane Reilly and Lynn Weston. Weston later hosted children's show The Book Place, which replaced Fat Cat and Friends after it was cancelled.

Fat Cat and Friends was originally produced in the studios of SAS 10 in Adelaide and it survived the 1987 frequency switch of channels 10 and 7 in Adelaide. It was written, directed and produced by Murray George for 13 years. After 1988 it continued to be produced at the station which then became SAS-7. The show ran on the 0-10 Network (as it was then known) from 1972 until 1987, then on the Seven Network from 1988 until 1991.

Fat Cat was originally played by Reg Whiteman for more than a decade. Fat Cat was then played by Ralf Hadzic for five years. Fat Cat was then played by Melanie George (1980–1985) who is now a freelance choreographer. Robert Fordham played Fat Cat from 1994 and performed on three of the Fat Cat Storytime videos. The character was later played off screen by a male friend of the show's musician, singer Patsy Biscoe.

== Cancellation ==
In 1990, the Australian Broadcasting Tribunal introduced a "P" (for preschooler) category, and every station was required to broadcast at least 130 hours of approved "P" rated content.

In 1991, "Fat Cat and Friends" lost its "P" rating, after the Children's Program Committee claimed that Fat Cat was not clearly defined (possibly including ambiguity of his gender), had "poor production values", and needed to be more educational. Given the expense required to attain a "P" rating, the Seven network decided to cancel the show, replacing it with The Book Place.

This move caused considerable public outcry. The rival Nine Network's A Current Affair program even filmed a mock funeral procession for the character featuring Nine mascot Humphrey B. Bear laying a wreath at the door of the Australian Broadcasting Tribunal. The criticism ultimately led to the Australian Broadcasting Tribunal disbanding the Children's Program Committee.

== After cancellation ==
Despite cancellation, Fat Cat still appears on Perth television screens as the mascot of Seven Perth's highly successful Telethon fundraising organisation. The character still says goodnight to Perth children on television at 7.30 each night.

After cancellation, during the 1990s Fat Cat often appeared on celebrity versions of the then Adelaide produced Wheel of Fortune. As Fat Cat did not speak he was usually paired up with Channel 7's resident puppet Agro who was the mouthpiece for the duo. Fat Cat also made numerous appearances in the Australian comedy show Full Frontal depicting the character's bizarre life as a troublesome housepet. Sketches included the character being neutered on a spoof of Animal Hospital, and being the object of jealousy between a married couple.

In October 2021, the 50th anniversary of Fat Cat's first appearance on television was acknowledged with a birthday reception for the mascot on the front steps of Parliament House, Perth.
