= Patsy Biscoe =

Patsy Biscoe AM
- Born: 1946 (age 79–80); Shimla, India
- Occupations: Television personality; singer; musician; local government politician
- Years active: 1958–2000s
- Known for: Fat Cat and Friends
- Notable work: Here's Humphrey
- Musical career
- Genres: Folk; children's music
- Instruments: Vocals; guitar

Patsy Biscoe AM (born 1946) is an Australian children's television personality, singer and guitarist. She regularly appeared on children's national television shows, Here's Humphrey and Fat Cat and Friends. She has released many children's music albums containing nursery rhymes and similar children's songs and has sold in excess of 500,000 units in her musical career.

== Background, early life and training ==
Biscoe was born in Shimla, India, to a British army officer and a civil servant in 1946. She came to Australia and settled in Sydney with her family during the Partition of India, and they moved to Sandy Bay in Hobart when she was nine.

Biscoe won a classical singing scholarship after making an unscheduled appearance at the St Mary's College annual eisteddfod. While studying medicine at the University of Tasmania, she sang and played guitar at a Sunday night jazz club. Her studies and fledgling career were interrupted by a car accident which damaged her eyesight. She covered a scar on her forehead from the accident with what became her distinctive long-fringed haircut.

Biscoe was a finalist in the Starflight International talent quest of the Australian television show, Bandstand, competing for an overseas trip and a recording contract. She recorded her first LP in Sydney in 1965 with CBS records. She was quite prolific on Graham Morphett's EMS Records label. By 1980, she had a single and at least five albums released on that label, a subsidiary of E.M.S. Sound Industries which was founded by Graham Morphett.

== Career ==
Biscoe gained fame in her adopted home of Adelaide when she regularly appeared on the Nine Network children's show, Here's Humphrey (1965–2008), which she hosted from September 1970. Later she was a presenter on local TV children's show, Channel Niners. She also appeared as a singer on children's TV show, Fat Cat and Friends (1972–91), on SAS-10.

Her album Songs to Play on a Rainy Day that was released on EMS-3010 contained 22 songs. It received a positive review in the 18 June 1976 issue of the Australian Jewish News.

In October 1980 she promoted wearing seat belts for children in a TV ad campaign by the Road Safety Council in South Australia.

Biscoe was pictured in the 7 November 1984 issue of the Port Linco'n Times. Biscoe and Fat Cat popped into the Port Lincon Hospital for a surprise visit where she entertained patients in the children's ward for over half an hour.

After retiring from performing, Biscoe became a naturopath. She has also been Deputy Mayor of the Barossa Council local government area and Chair of the Tanunda Town Committee.

== Recognition ==
Biscoe was made a Member of the Order of Australia in 2016 for her services to music and her local community.

During the early 1990s, Biscoe was parodied by Adelaide comedian Glynn Nicholas, who played Paté Biscuit on the Australian Broadcasting Corporation television comedy show, The Big Gig. Biscoe appeared in several episodes with Nicholas, one time tying up Biscuit and taking his place on the show with Bongo, Biscuit's hand puppet. She also appeared on the show using her own hand puppet, Bongette—the female counterpart of Bongo. When on screen together, neither Bongo nor Bongette could hide their attraction for each other.

== Discography ==
=== Studio albums ===
List of albums, with selected chart positions
Title	Album details	Peak chart positions	Certifications
Title	Album details	AUS	Certifications
The Voice of Patsy Biscoe	Released: 1966; Label: CBS (BP 233287)	–	
Patsy Biscoe Sings Your Fifty Favourite Nursery Rhymes	Released: 1973; Label: EMS Records (EMS 1001)	77 (Note: Patsy Biscoe Sings Your Fifty Favourite Nursery Rhymes peaked at number 77 in August 1982)	AUS: Gold
Games & Songs to Play on Your Birthday	Released: 1978; Label: EMS Records (EMS TV 7081)	–	
Jesus Loves Me	Released: 1979; Label: EMS Records (EMS TV 7078)	–	
Patsy's Christmas Album	Released: December 1980; Label: EMS Records (EMS TV 7006)	62	AUS: Gold
50 Favourite Nursery Rhymes Volume Two	Released: June 1982; Label: J & B Records (JB 105)	48	AUS: Gold
50 Favourite Nursery Rhymes Volume Three	Released: December 1983; Label: J & B Records (JB 160)	91	
Songs to Play on a Rainy Day (For Children of All Ages)	Released: 1976; Label: EMS Records (EMS-3010)	–	
Come Waltzing Matilda	Released: 1986; Label: Powderworks (POW 3063)	–	
Who Built the Ark?	Released: 1987; Label: Powderworks (POW 3066)	–	
Hush Little Baby	Released: 1987; Label: Powderworks (POW 3072)	–	
Once Upon a Time with Patsy Biscoe	Released: 1989; Label: RCA (BPCD0705)	–	
