= Glynn Nicholas =

Australian actor, comic and director

- Born: 1952 (age 73–74); Bristol, England
- Occupations: Actor; comedian; director; writer; producer
- Years active: 1977– present

Glynn Nicholas (born 1952) is an Australian actor, comedian, director, writer, and producer. In the early 1990s he developed several the comic alter ego Paté Biscuit, a parody of Patsy Biscoe, a fellow presenter on the TV show Here's Humphrey, which he later presented in The Big Gig. He has appeared in many stage productions.

== Early life and education ==
Glynn Nicholas was born in Bristol, England in 1952. He subsequently moved to Adelaide, South Australia.

In 1982, he studied mime with Zora Šemberová, a former dancer and choreographer from Czechoslovakia who taught at the University of Adelaide and Flinders University and was founder of the Australian Mime Theatre. He learnt circus skills at a college in San Francisco, and performed regularly at Pier 39 while he was there.

== Busking and early career ==
Glynn Nicholas began his career as a busker in Europe and the United States, starting in Munich in 1977, but he often returned to Adelaide, where he was known for his busking act in Rundle Mall. His act consisted of singing and playing up to three instruments at the same time. Over time his focus shifted to include physical comedy, magic, mime, and audience participation.

During the late 1970s and early '80s he busked in USA, Australia, and Europe. He often played in Adelaide in the central shopping precinct, Rundle Mall, which had recently been closed to traffic.

== Television career ==
Nicholas first appeared on Australian television as a presenter on Channel 9's children's show Here's Humphrey in the 1980s, performing songs, dances, stories and games with a large mute bear. In 1991, his album Glynn Nicholas & The Funky Fossils: The Dinosaur Album was nominated for an ARIA Award for Best Children's Album.

Off-air, he developed a character called Paté Biscuit, a parody of another presenter on Here's Humphrey, Patsy Biscoe. He mimicked her distinctive bob haircut, sing-song voice and "school-prefect" manner, but added cruelty, blood, and a naughty hand puppet called Bongo, to the juvenile story-telling. In 1989, Paté Biscuit found a ready audience on the ABC's new comedy show The Big Gig, where Nicholas had a regular spot. In one episode, the real Patsy Biscoe was seen presenting The Big Gig show with Bongo, having tied Paté Biscuit up. In 1990, Nicholas took over from Wendy Harmer as host of The Big Gig for two seasons. Another of Glynn's characters on the show was Sergeant Smith.

In 1991, Angus and Robertson published his book Bedtime Stories with Paté Biscuit, which sold 18,000 copies.

In 1996, Nicholas co-produced a surreal ten-part comedy series on ABC Television, The Glynn Nicholas Show. It was written by Nicholas, fellow Australian comedian Shaun Micallef, and others.

== Theatre career ==
Since 1992 Nicholas has focussed on writing, producing and performing live comedy. These include several live shows, ranging from the solo Glynn with a why? and Crossing the Line, to ensemble pieces like Scat and all that, Wrung Out, Kissing Frogs, Pumping Irony, and Certified Male, which toured at least seven countries. It was written with his regular artistic collaborator Scott Rankin.

Other writing credits include Kissing Frogs (1991-3) and Leaves Falling at Midnight and co-writer of the book for Eurobeat - almost Eurovision (2006–2009), which he also directed and produced.

He also turned his hand to Shakespeare for the Melbourne Theatre Company's production of The Comedy of Errors, played Major-General Stanley in opera in Essgee Entertainment's 1994 production of The Pirates of Penzance, and in the variety productions The Vaudeville Extravaganza (1994) and Oh Come All Ye Stressful (2005).

In the 2000s his Glynn Nicholas Group entertainment company was producing and touring several shows internationally including Certified Male, and the hit musical Eurobeat: Almost Eurovision directed by Nicholas, which was the top-selling show of the 2007 Edinburgh Festival Fringe. In 2008 it toured the UK for 20 weeks and then ran for three months in the West End.

In January 2019, Glynn collaborated with Gretel Killeen in a production called "#UsTwo", at Holden Street Theatres in Adelaide. The show was described as a mix of "stories, comedy, music, nostalgia, sexual tension, tears, outright lies, familiarity and a bit of tango", comparing male and female perspectives.

== Recognition and awards ==
- 1986: Winner, Australian busking championships
- 1991: Nomination, ARIA Award for Best Children's Album, for Glynn Nicholas & The Funky Fossils: The Dinosaur Album

== Other roles ==
Nicholas has been chair of the arts and social-justice company Big hART, and president of the "Society for the Prevention of Kyle Sandilands".

Working as a public speaker, Glynn produces shows for the corporate market.
