= Will Goodings =

Australian television and radio presenter

- Born: 5 July 1983 (age 41)
- Occupation(s): radio presenter, television newsreader
- Known for: hosting radio programs, reading TV news
- Notable work: FIVAaa Breakfast, 10 News First: Adelaide, Seven News Adelaide
- Father: Graeme Goodings

Will Goodings (born 5 July 1983) is an Australian television and radio presenter.

He is best known for co-hosting FIVEaa Breakfast with David Penberthy and for anchoring Seven News Adelaide bulletins alongside Rosanna Mangiarelli on Channel 7.

== Radio ==
Goodings commenced working at FIVEaa in 2007. He was appointed as the host of the station's afternoon program in December 2013. Goodings hosted the afternoon show until September when he was announced as the new co-host of the FIVEaa breakfast show, replacing Mark Aiston who moved to a weekend lifestyle program. Jeremy Cordeaux replaced Goodings on the afternoon program.

Since Goodings joined Penberthy on the breakfast show, the program has continued to consistently rate well and the duo have routinely been nominated as the Best On-Air Team (Metro AM) at the annual Australian Commercial Radio Awards. However they have never won the award, having been defeated each year by teams from either Sydney's 2GB or Melbourne's 3AW.

When Penberthy took paternity leave in 2017, Goodings co-hosted the breakfast program with various people including Jay Weatherill, Steven Marshall, Nick Xenophon and Grant Stevens.

At the beginning of the COVID-19 pandemic in South Australia in 2020, Goodings commenced co-hosting the breakfast program remotely from a home studio.

== Television ==
In January 2019, it was announced Goodings would be the new sports presenter on 10 News First: Adelaide, replacing Nick Butler who relocated back to Melbourne.

Goodings continued reading the sport on 10 News First alongside anchor Rebecca Morse until the pair were made redundant in September 2020 when the network underwent a major restructure, which included the axing of the locally-presented Adelaide edition of 10 News First. The final bulletin went to air on 11 September 2020, after which it was replaced with a combined Victoria/South Australia bulletin presented by Jennifer Keyte from Melbourne.

In September 2022, Goodings began co-presenting the weekend editions of Seven News Adelaide with Rosanna Mangiarelli, replacing Mike Smithson.

Following the retirement of long-serving weeknight newsreader Jane Doyle, it was announced in December 2022 that Goodings and Mangiarelli would replace Doyle as weeknight presenters in 2023, with Smithson returning as weekend newsreader. On their first night together, Seven News Adelaide recorded more than double the ratings of rival Nine News Adelaide, with 132,000 viewers to the latter's 61,000.

== Personal ==
Goodings is married. He and his wife have one daughter who was born in October 2022.

He studied politics at the University of Adelaide.

Goodings is the son of former Seven News presenter Graeme Goodings.
