= Kane Cornes =

Australian rules footballer and media personality (born 1983)

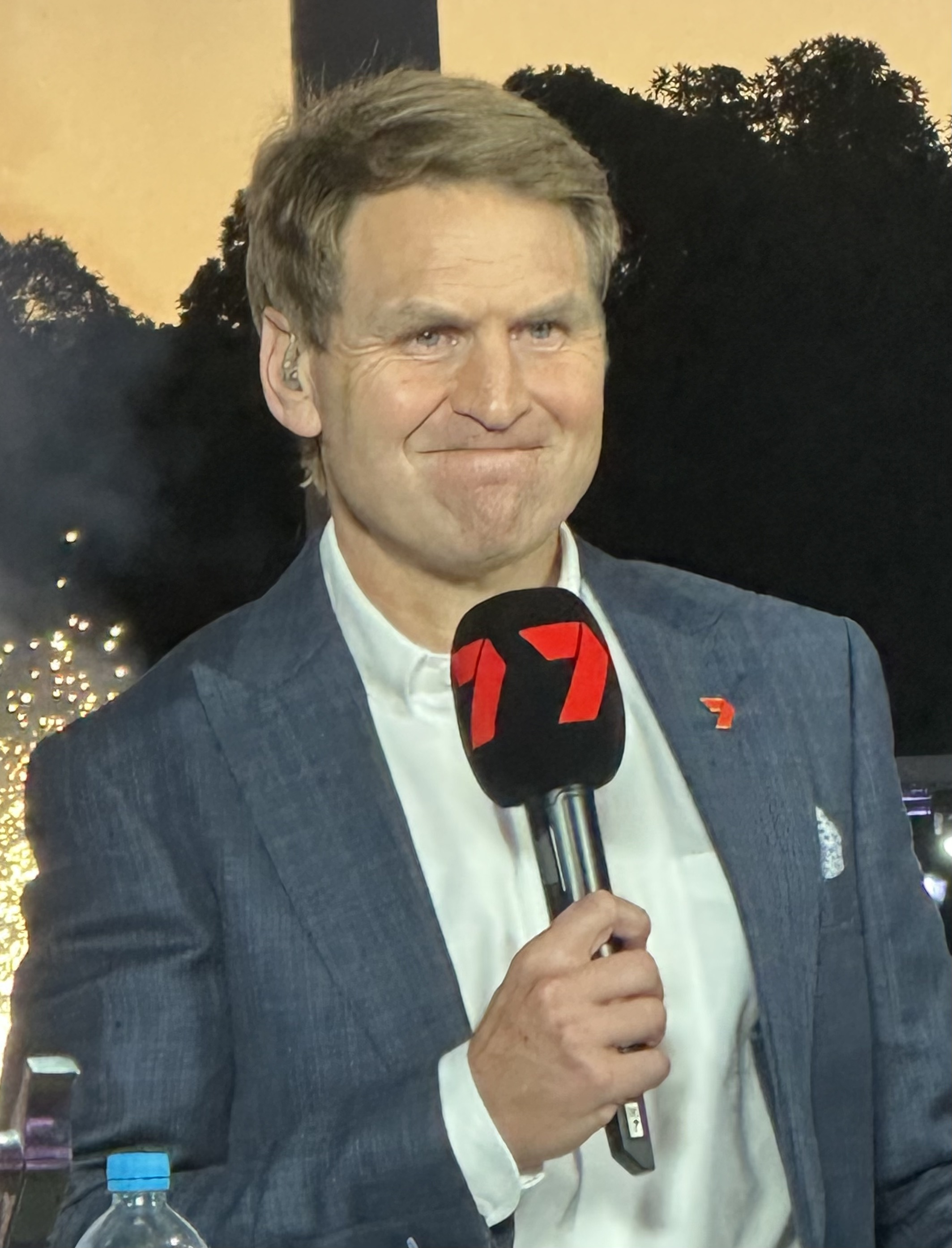
- Cornes in April 2025

Personal information
- Full name: Kane Graham Cornes
- Born: 5 January 1983 (age 43)
- Original team: Glenelg (SANFL)/Brighton Bombers
- Draft: No. 20, 2000 National Draft
- Height: 183 cm (6 ft 0 in)
- Weight: 83 kg (183 lb)
- Position: Midfielder

Playing career
Years	Club	Games (Goals)
2001–2015	Port Adelaide	300 (93)

Representative team honours^{2}
Years	Team	Games (Goals)
2008	Dream Team	1 (0)
- ^{2} Representative statistics correct as of 2008.

Career highlights
- AFL premiership player: 2004; 4x John Cahill Medal (2007, 2008, 2010, 2012); 2x All-Australian Team (2005, 2007); Peter Badcoe VC Medal (Round 6, 2008); Port Adelaide Hall of Fame inductee (2019); 2x Merv Agars Medal: (2005, 2009)

Kane Graham Cornes (born 5 January 1983) is an Australian sports journalist, commentator and former Australian rules footballer who played for Port Adelaide in the Australian Football League (AFL). Known primarily as a tagger during his playing career, Cornes is a four-time John Cahill Medal winner and a 2004 premiership player. He held the club record for the most games for Port Adelaide in the AFL, before being surpassed by Travis Boak.

Following his retirement from the AFL, Cornes transitioned into media, becoming one of the more prominent and polarising commentators and analysts in Australian football broadcasting. He appears regularly for Seven Network and SEN, having previously featured on The Sunday Footy Show and Footy Classified. He is known for outspoken and frequently controversial opinions on players, coaches, and clubs, which have generated significant public debate and on-air disputes with AFL figures.

== Early life ==
A product of Sacred Heart College and Glenelg in the SANFL, he made his AFL debut in 2001 after being selected with pick 20 in the 2000 AFL draft. Before his professional football career he attended Sacred Heart College, which is one of the most prolific schools in Australia in terms of producing Australian footballers. His All Australian brother, Chad Cornes, also attended Sacred Heart College and played for Glenelg in the SANFL. They are the sons of South Australian football identity Graham Cornes, and stepsons of 2007 Federal Labor candidate Nicole Cornes. They have three younger half-sisters paternally.

== AFL career ==
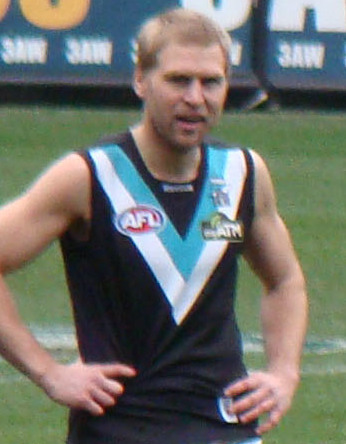
Cornes playing for Port Adelaide during the 2011 AFL season

=== Early career ===
In 2001 and 2002, Cornes played in Port Adelaide's two victorious pre-season premiership teams. Then, in 2004, as the team went from strength to strength despite losing important finals games to infamously be deemed as 'chokers', Cornes was in the team that won Port Adelaide's first AFL premiership at the 2004 AFL Grand Final, where he placed third in the voting for the Norm Smith Medal. 2004 saw Cornes' fourth season in the competition, cementing his position in the midfield while averaging 20 disposals a game. Cornes continued his good form into 2005, becoming All-Australian, and in 2006 played his 100th game for the club in round 7. He also topped the AFL Dreamteam competition despite Port Adelaide having a bad year.

=== Best and fairest years ===
In 2007, Cornes again won All-Australian selection for the second time in a team otherwise dominated by Geelong players. He was also the leading possession winner in the AFL, received the most Brownlow votes for the year for Port Adelaide, and won their best and fairest, the John Cahill Medal, ahead of brother Chad. Despite playing in the Port Adelaide side in the 2007 AFL Grand Final that lost to Geelong by a record 119-point margin, Cornes kicked a goal and was deemed among Port Adelaide's best players.

In 2010, Cornes took out his third John Cahill Medal and confirmed his reputation as the club's most consistent player through a new attacking role that went beyond his previous role of merely tagging the opposition's best players. His 36-possession, 2-goal game against the Western Bulldogs in Round 16 of that year was a highlight, in addition to a 38-possession effort against West Coast late in the year. Instrumental in the Power's late season fortunes, his third best and fairest highlighted his durability as a mainstay of the Port Adelaide engine room.

=== Struggles under Primus ===
In 2011, Cornes had a difficult season by his standards as he adjusted to a new role which took him further away from his traditional tagging duties. Before 2011, Cornes had not missed a single game since 2003. But round 4, 2011 saw his streak of 174 consecutive games come to an end when he was omitted from the side. Playing more on the wing and across halfback, he was sent back to Glenelg in the SANFL with a view to adapting better to the coaching panel's new expectations. He still managed to play 17 games out of a possible 23, despite spending time back at the SANFL Tigers, and was serviceable in his ball-winning ability. Cornes recalls that during this time, coach Matthew Primus informed him that his "services were no longer needed", and thus Cornes sought out a move to the Adelaide Crows, but nothing came of the move.

=== Form resurgence ===
Cornes made a return to form in 2012, playing every game, and playing as a setup midfielder. He won his fourth John Cahill Medal, equalling the AFL record, which topped the disposals count for the season again. Cornes received high praise for returning to his acclaimed tagging football with top performances on midfield heavyweights Brent Harvey (North Melbourne) and Gary Ablett (Gold Coast).

Cornes reached his 250th game in Round 5 of 2013, where Port Adelaide came from 41-points down to win 12.12 (84) to 10.19 (79) at AAMI Stadium against West Coast, taking the Power to a 5–0 start to the season. Shortly after, Cornes passed Warren Tredrea's record of 258 games to become the man who has played the most games for Port Adelaide in the AFL, in a match where Port thrashed Greater Western Sydney at Sydney Showground Stadium, 19.11 (125) to 6.14 (50). Cornes has played a vital role under coach Ken Hinkley in reinventing Port Adelaide and getting the team back into finals in 2013, and helping the Power to their best ever start to an AFL season in 2014, starting 10–1, before eventually losing the 2014 preliminary final to Hawthorn, the eventual premiers, by three points.

=== Late career ===
Cornes' 2015 season was short. He played the first two games of the season before being rested in round three. He then played a further three games to take his career tally to 298 before announcing that the round 8 game against Richmond would be his 300th and last to join the South Australian Metropolitan Fire Service. He finished his Port Adelaide career having played a total of 300 games, winning 4 best and fairest, two All Australian honours and a premiership.

== Media career ==
=== Background and transition ===
Cornes took up a full-time media career in 2016 after a short tenure with the South Australia Metropolitan Fire Service, where he had been trying to balance both commitments simultaneously. He began with appearances on The Sunday Footy Show and 1116 SEN, as well as writing for The Advertiser. He quickly established a reputation as a willing and outspoken commentator, willing to make strong public judgements on players and coaches that more cautious media figures avoided.

Cornes is a regularly scheduled broadcaster on SEN, hosting various shows including Fireball Friday on SEN Breakfast alongside David King, and the regular talkback show Sportsday. In 2024, Cornes joined Seven Network's broadcasting team for AFL football, commentating games and hosting various football-related shows on the channel, with Seven subsequently describing him as the "No. 1 voice in footy" ahead of the 2025 season.

=== Controversial commentary and public disputes ===
Cornes has become one of the more divisive figures in Australian football media, attracting both significant audiences and significant criticism for an on-air style characterised by blunt player assessments, willingness to publicly rank and criticise active footballers, and frequent clashes with players, coaches, and other media figures. Supporters have described his approach as refreshingly direct in a media landscape often dominated by former players reluctant to criticise peers; critics have accused him of being needlessly harsh, sensationalist, and occasionally inaccurate.

==== Taylor Walker ====
Cornes' most prolonged and high-profile public dispute has been with Adelaide Crows forward Taylor Walker, with whom he has engaged in an ongoing exchange of public criticism spanning several years. Walker has publicly referenced Cornes' brief career with the Metropolitan Fire Service as a point of rebuttal, and the feud has been widely covered in AFL media as an example of the adversarial relationship between active players and critical commentators.

==== Patrick Dangerfield ====
Cornes has engaged in notable public exchanges with Geelong midfielder Patrick Dangerfield, who has responded publicly to Cornes' commentary, including a widely reported response in which Dangerfield mocked Cornes' on-air outfits during a Wacky Wednesday segment.

==== Hawthorn Football Club ====
Cornes has been a persistent and vocal critic of the Hawthorn Football Club and its players, attracting strong pushback from Hawthorn figures. Former Hawthorn player Jordan Lewis described Cornes as having "a track record" of what he characterised as disrespectful commentary.

==== Player rankings and assessments ====
Cornes has become particularly associated in recent years with public rankings of AFL players — including lists identifying what he considers the most overrated or underperforming players in the competition. These assessments have generated significant public and media debate, with several players and clubs responding publicly to criticism directed at them. His willingness to make strong negative assessments of active players has been described both as a point of differentiation from other commentators and as a source of ongoing friction with the playing community.

==== Reception ====
Cornes' media style has divided opinion within the AFL community. He has been praised by some commentators and broadcasters for a willingness to voice unpopular opinions and hold players and clubs to account in a media environment where former players are often reluctant to criticise those still playing. His critics, including several active and former AFL players, have described his commentary as unnecessarily harsh, at times factually questionable, and motivated by a desire to generate controversy rather than provide genuine analysis.

== Personal life ==
On 31 December 2004, Kane married long-time girlfriend Lucy, whom he met at Sacred Heart College. They have three children together.

Cornes was a member of the South Australian Metropolitan Fire Service for only six months after retiring from the AFL, while also trying to balance working in the media before leaving to take up a solely media-based position. He has also provided part-time coaching work at the Glenelg Football Club.

Cornes is an accomplished distance runner, having finished in the top 30 of the Melbourne Marathon and Gold Coast Marathon.

== Playing statistics ==
Legend
G	Goals	K	Kicks	D	Disposals	T	Tackles
B	Behinds	H	Handballs	M	Marks
#	Played in that season's premiership team

Season	Team	No.	Games	Totals							Averages (per game)							Votes
Season	Team	No.	Games	G	B	K	H	D	M	T	G	B	K	H	D	M	T	Votes
2001	Port Adelaide	39	7	1	4	47	34	81	20	8	0.1	0.6	6.7	4.9	11.6	2.9	1.1	0
2002	Port Adelaide	18	15	3	4	136	54	190	40	39	0.2	0.3	9.1	3.6	12.7	2.7	2.6	0
2003	Port Adelaide	18	22	12	10	195	86	281	88	51	0.5	0.5	8.9	3.9	12.8	4.0	2.3	0
2004^{#}	Port Adelaide	18	25	12	10	302	197	499	131	57	0.5	0.4	12.1	7.9	20.0	5.2	2.3	6
2005	Port Adelaide	18	24	18	10	338	252	590	135	58	0.8	0.4	14.1	10.5	24.6	5.6	2.4	7
2006	Port Adelaide	18	22	7	11	344	253	597	145	73	0.3	0.5	15.6	11.5	27.1	6.6	3.3	7
2007	Port Adelaide	18	25	11	9	360	336	696	170	94	0.4	0.4	14.4	13.4	27.8	6.8	3.8	13
2008	Port Adelaide	18	22	5	4	268	345	613	128	79	0.2	0.2	12.2	15.7	27.9	5.8	3.6	3
2009	Port Adelaide	18	22	7	4	286	310	596	106	76	0.3	0.2	13.0	14.1	27.1	4.8	3.5	4
2010	Port Adelaide	18	22	4	4	271	335	606	103	103	0.2	0.2	12.3	15.2	27.5	4.7	4.7	6
2011	Port Adelaide	18	17	1	1	180	194	374	70	58	0.1	0.1	10.6	11.4	22.0	4.1	3.4	0
2012	Port Adelaide	18	22	5	6	282	278	560	124	64	0.2	0.3	12.8	12.6	25.5	5.6	2.9	3
2013	Port Adelaide	18	23	5	4	341	289	630	127	107	0.2	0.2	14.8	12.6	27.4	5.5	4.7	8
2014	Port Adelaide	18	25	1	5	328	279	607	132	111	0.0	0.2	13.1	11.2	24.3	5.3	4.4	5
2015	Port Adelaide	18	7	1	0	74	66	140	37	25	0.1	0.0	10.6	9.4	20.0	5.3	3.6	0
Career			300	93	86	3752	3308	7060	1556	1003	0.3	0.3	12.5	11.0	23.5	5.2	3.3	62
