= Here's Humphrey =

Former Australian children's TV show

- Genre: Preschool
- Created by: Rex Heading
- Starring: Humphrey B. Bear
- Country of origin: Australia
- Original language: English
- No. of seasons: 40
- No. of episodes: 3,000; 1,776

Production
- Executive producer: Rosemary Blackwell (1995–2003)
- Production location: Adelaide
- Running time: 30 minutes
- Production company: Banksia Productions

Original release
- Network: Nine Network
- Release: 24 May 1965 – 29 February 2008

Here's Humphrey was an Australian children's television series produced by Banksia Productions for the Nine Network, which first aired on 24 May 1965 and last went to air in 2008.

It features an anthropomorphic brown bear character (a person in a costume) known as Humphrey B. Bear, and was produced in Adelaide, South Australia. In September 2013, community station, West TV, began airing repeats of Here's Humphrey in Perth. The character still exists, owned by Ozpix Entertainment as of 2020.

Here's Humphrey became one of the most successful programs for preschoolers in Australia, was sold internationally, and is one of the longest-running children's television programs in the world. The program received multiple Logie Television Awards.

== Format ==
The series features anthropomorphic brown bear character known as Humphrey B. Bear, who is mute. Set in a magical forest, Humphrey is paired with a human presenter, who narrates their adventures. The series takes place in Humphrey's tree house, where he partakes in magical adventures.

One of the central ideas presented in the show is the importance of taking part and not always being successful at everything.

== Cast ==
=== Presenters ===
Presenter	Tenure	Ref.
Ian Fairweather	1967	
Patsy Biscoe	1970–1972	
Sue Cardwell	1970s	
Malcolm Harslett	1972–1984	
Martin Portus		
Robin Roenfeldt (Note: Also known as a host of Channel Niners and C'mon Kids) (Note: Also producer and writer in the 1990s.)	1979–1988	
Joanna Moore	1980–1989	
Michael Pope	1984	
Glynn Nicholas	1987-1991	
Heidi Greig	1988–1992	
David Sadler	1988–1992	
Terry Webb	1988–1992	
Ann Carter	1988–1992	
Narelle Higson	1989–1993	
Ambrae Jamae	1992–1994	
Albert Colbert	1993–1996	
Anthony O'Donohue (Note: Also producer, writer and editor in the final seasons)	1993–2008	
Joni Combe (Note: Daughter of singer-songwriter Peter Combe) (Note: Also known as the original/vintage portrayer of Rhapsody from The Fairies)	1995–2000	
Carolyn Ferrie (Note: Also known as the voice of Dorothy the Dinosaur for many years)	1997–1999	
Tess Masters (Note: Presented a special American version of the show for the 1998 public television series Someday School)	1998	
Diane Dixon	1999–2000	
Iyari Limon (Note: Presented a Spanish-language version of the show, titled simply Humphrey, which was broadcast in Latin America and the United States on Galavisión)	1999-2001	
Amber Brown	2007–2008	

=== Humphrey B. Bear ===
Several performers portrayed the role of Humphrey.

- Edwin Duryea (1965)
- Ross Hutchinson
- John Maclean
- Tom Fairlie
- Aaron Dubois (1992-1994)
- Tony Balzan (1985–2008)
- Anthony O'Donohue
- Bec Schembri (2002-2007)

== Production ==
Here's Humphrey was originally aired exclusively in Adelaide on NWS-9, premiering on 24 May 1965, before airing nationally two years later. Filmed in Adelaide and produced by Banskia Productions, the character of Humphrey was initially known as "Bear Bear" until he was renamed as a result of a competition. The program was created as a result of Humphrey's previous popularity on the afternoon program The Channel Niners.Here's Humphrey was granted a P classification, deeming it specifically designed to meet the needs and interests of pre-schoolers and allowing it to be broadcast on the Nine Network with a 30-minute runtime commercial-free. Classification deals allowed the Nine Network to repeat each episode three times.

The Nine Network almost cancelled the series in 2000, which led to protests and comments from the Prime Minister. The network responded to popular public demand and allowed its continuation. The series was commissioned for 180 new episodes in May 2000. New episodes aired until 2003.

In February 2007, Nine commissioned a new series of Here's Humphrey, filming episodes for the first time since 2003. This followed negotiations with the network, after speculation they would not renew the series approaching the end of its contract. The episodes started airing in December 2007 and concluded in 2009 when Banksia Entertainment was wound up.

In September 2019, it was revealed OZPIX were planning to revive Here's Humphrey with a pitch to broadcasters at MIPCOM in France. The production company expressed interest in integrating live action characters with virtual technology. The production team for the project was led by Julie Greene, former executive producer of Hi-5, and included Catherine Martin and Helen Martin, early childhood specialists who also worked on the program.

As of 2020, Ozpix Entertainment owns the character, whose "home" is at Village Roadshow Studios on the Gold Coast, Queensland.

== Episodes ==
More than 3,000 episodes of Here's Humphrey have been produced. It has also been stated that only 1,776 episodes were filmed.

Series	Episodes	Originally released	
Series	Episodes	First released	Last released
2000	180	2000	2003
2007	60	10 December 2007	29 February 2008

== Reception ==
In 2019, TV Week listed Here's Humphrey at #96 in its list of the 101 greatest Australian television shows of all time, which appeared in its monthly TV Week Close Up publication. The magazine said young viewers loved watching Humphrey leave his tree house for adventures in the magic forest.

It has been stated that Here's Humphrey is one of the most successful programs for preschoolers of all time. It is one of the longest running children's programs in the world.

== Awards and nominations ==
The program received multiple Logie Television Awards, and the character won a special "Citizen of the Year" Award at the 1994 Australia Day celebrations.

Year	Award	Category	Recipient	Result	Ref.
1969	Logie Award	Best Children's TV Series	Here's Humphrey	Won	
1970	Logie Award	Best Children's TV Series	Here's Humphrey	Won	
1975	Parents Without Partners	Distinguished Service to Children Award	Humphrey B. Bear	Won	
1978	Festival of Light		Humphrey B. Bear	Won	
1978	Logie Award	Favourite Children's Personality	Humphrey B. Bear	Won	
1979	Television Society of Australia	Individual Achievement	Humphrey B. Bear	Won	
1982	Television Society of Australia	Penguin Award for Best Children's Personality	Humphrey B. Bear	Won	
1982	Logie Award	Best Children's TV Series	Here's Humphrey	Won	
1994	Logie Award	Australia Day Citizen of the Year	Humphrey B. Bear	Won	
2003	Logie Award	Heritage Listed and National Trust Icon	Humphrey B. Bear	Won	

== See also ==
- List of Australian television series
- List of longest-running Australian television series
