= Chad Cornes =

Australian rules footballer (born 1979)

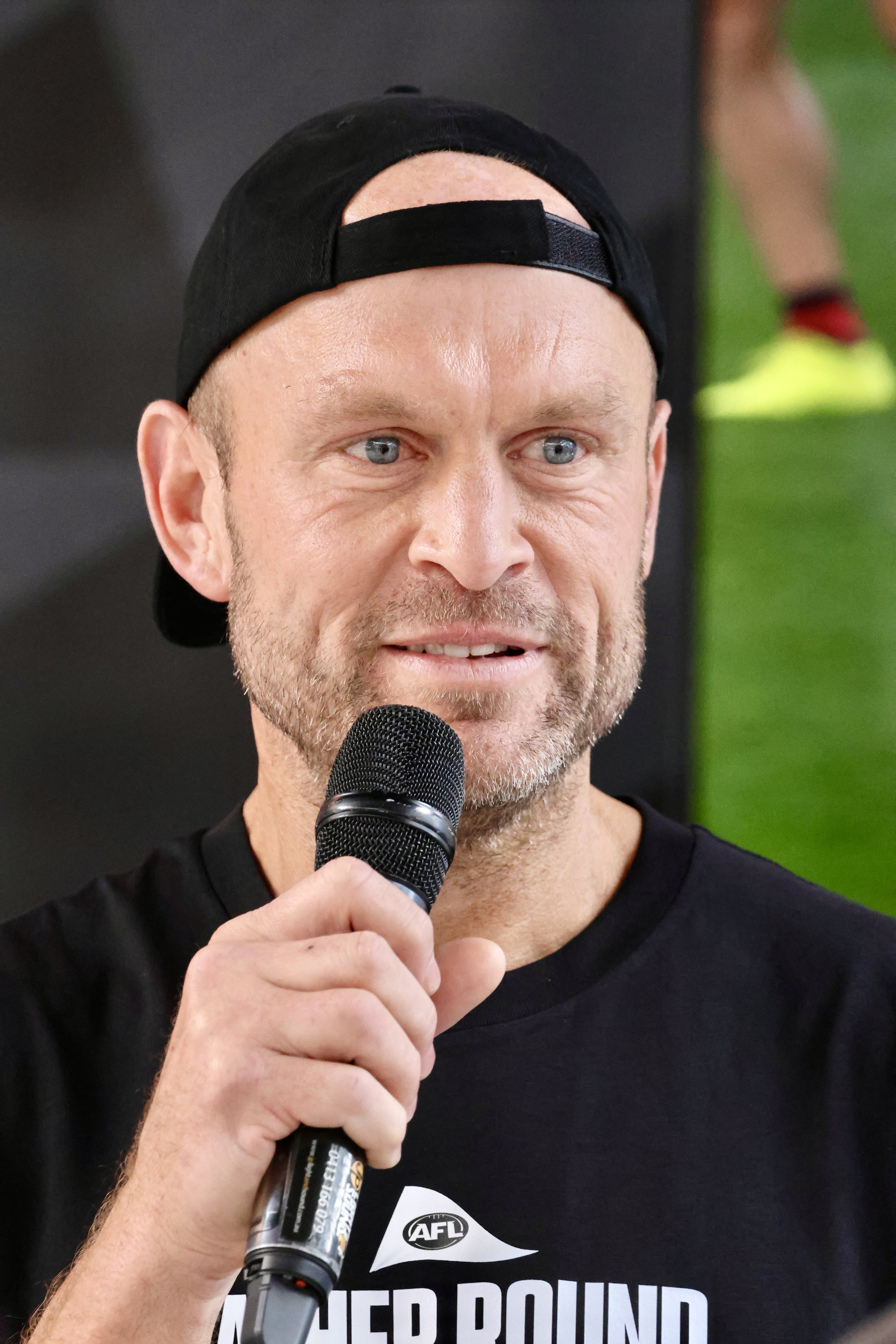
- Cornes at the 2026 Gather Round

Personal information
- Full name: Chad Studley Cornes
- Born: 12 November 1979 (age 47); Adelaide, South Australia
- Original team: Glenelg (SANFL)
- Draft: No. 9, 1997 National Draft, Port Adelaide
- Height: 192 cm (6 ft 4 in)
- Weight: 93 kg (205 lb)
- Position: Utility

Playing career^{1}
Years	Club	Games (Goals)
1998–2011	Port Adelaide	239 (175)
2012–2013	Greater Western Sydney	16 (4)
Total		255 (179)

International team honours
Years	Team	Games (Goals)
2002	Australia	2

Coaching career
Years	Club	Games (W–L–D)
2016–2017	Port Adelaide (SANFL)	38 (24–15–0)
- ^{1} Playing statistics correct to the end of 2013.

Career highlights
- AFL premiership player: 2004; 2× All-Australian team: 2004, 2007; Showdown Medal: 2006 (round 21); Port Adelaide Football Club Hall of Fame Inductee: 2023; Peter Badcoe VC Medal: 2007; SANFL Hall of Fame Inductee: 2014; 2× AFL pre-season premiership player: 2001, 2002

Chad Studley Cornes (born 12 November 1979) is a former professional Australian rules footballer who played for the Port Adelaide Football Club and Greater Western Sydney Giants in the Australian Football League (AFL). He was a member of the Port Adelaide side which won the premiership in 2004. On 3 July 2013, he retired from AFL football due to a troublesome knee. Cornes is currently serving as a forward line coach for the Port Adelaide Football Club.

== Playing career ==
=== Port Adelaide career (1998–2011) ===
==== Early career (1998–2003) ====
Cornes began his AFL career as a key-forward after debuting in 1999 and playing 6 games in his first season. Cornes was a regular in the Power forward line in 2000, booting 22 goals. Between 2000 and 2003 Cornes and Tredrea formed one of the best forward partnerships in the AFL, with Chad playing up the ground demonstrating his great contested marking ability. Despite being one of the best forwards in the game, Cornes was moved into defence at the start of the 2004 season.

==== Career change (2004–2005) ====
In 2004, Cornes was moved to centre-half back. The new position worked wonders as Cornes began to single-handedly dominate games, earning himself his first All-Australian award, and finishing third in the Brownlow medal. The move to centre-half back was a key reason for Port Adelaide's dominance, which culminated in their first Premiership in 2004, defeating the Brisbane Lions by 40 points. He had a key defensive role on Brisbane Lions' forward Jonathan Brown during the Grand Final, restricting him to just one behind for the match.

After Port Adelaide's dominance in 2004, Cornes was again used as a key defender to great effect. However, Port Adelaide was unable to repeat its finals' glory of 2004, being eliminated by cross town rivals Adelaide in the first semi-final.

==== Leadership (2006–2007) ====
2006 was a disappointing one for Port Adelaide, and one which frustrated Cornes in particular. The season never really took off, and with Cornes now being a senior player, he was moved into the midfield to help the younger players. This move paid off as he dominated matches, which was a huge positive for the Power in an otherwise disappointing campaign. Cornes won the Showdown Medal in round 21.

In 2007, Cornes was a key midfielder and has a largely impressive season. Cornes finished the 2007 season with 643 disposals, and led the competition in kicks, and went into the Brownlow medal count as one of the favourites. The great form of Cornes in midfield was crucial to the side making the AFL Grand Final, which was a huge surprise to most, including Cornes. Despite not expecting to have a good season, when they did make the Grand Final the belief appeared to be strong but they were unable to win their second flag, going down to Geelong by a record 119 points

==== Injuries (2008–2010) ====
Port looked to bounce back from their Grand Final humiliation of the previous year when they took on Geelong in the opening round of 2008. Despite being close throughout the match, they were unable to win and that was the start of a four-game losing streak for the Power. Cornes suffered a broken finger in Round 6 against St Kilda but returned just three weeks later despite the nature of the break being very severe. After 2 years with on and off form, Cornes broke his finger again in mid-2010.

==== End of Port Adelaide career (2011) ====
Despite having to stay on the sidelines for the rest of the year, he played on in 2011. In August 2011 he announced that he would be retiring from the AFL after the following week's match against Collingwood.

=== Greater Western Sydney career (2012–2013) ===
Cornes came out of retirement, and was traded to the Giants during the 2011 October Trade Week. He was a playing assistant coach. On 3 July 2013 Cornes retired from AFL football.

== Coaching career ==
=== Greater Western Sydney (2013–2015) ===
Post retirement, Chad Cornes remained with GWS in a full-time coaching role with their backlines, a position he held from 2013 to 2015.

=== Port Adelaide ===
On 21 September 2015, Cornes was announced as the SANFL coach of the Port Adelaide Football Club. He was elevated to a forward development coach with the Power at the end of 2017.

== Family ==
In addition to his brother Kane Cornes, his father, Graham Cornes, is also a former VFL/SANFL footballer, playing 5 games for North Melbourne and 317 games for Glenelg with a career spanning from 1967 to 1982. Graham also coached various AFL/SANFL teams between 1983 and 1994. His stepmother Nicole Cornes, who is 9 years older than him, was a 2007 Labor candidate. He has three younger half-sisters paternally.

He is currently engaged to long-time partner Mikayla Graetz. They have one daughter, Wynter Viola (2021).

== Playing statistics ==
Legend
G	Goals	K	Kicks	D	Disposals	T	Tackles
B	Behinds	H	Handballs	M	Marks

Season	Team	No.	Games	Totals							Averages (per game)						
Season	Team	No.	Games	G	B	K	H	D	M	T	G	B	K	H	D	M	T
1999	Port Adelaide	35	6	5	4	19	1	20	10	3	0.8	0.7	3.2	0.2	3.3	1.7	0.5
2000	Port Adelaide	35	21	22	18	156	81	237	81	25	1.0	0.9	7.4	3.9	11.3	3.9	1.2
2001	Port Adelaide	35	24	21	26	218	95	313	126	23	0.9	1.1	9.1	4.0	13.0	5.3	1.0
2002	Port Adelaide	35	25	29	19	297	108	405	171	26	1.2	0.8	11.9	4.3	16.2	6.8	1.0
2003	Port Adelaide	35	22	29	30	258	86	344	172	46	1.3	1.4	11.7	3.9	15.6	7.8	2.1
2004	Port Adelaide	35	24	4	7	359	139	498	188	37	0.2	0.3	15.0	5.8	20.8	7.8	1.5
2005	Port Adelaide	35	19	8	7	310	109	419	165	42	0.4	0.4	16.3	5.7	22.1	8.7	2.2
2006	Port Adelaide	35	19	13	14	294	118	412	140	31	0.7	0.7	15.5	6.2	21.7	7.4	1.6
2007	Port Adelaide	35	25	18	12	427	216	643	174	56	0.7	0.5	17.1	8.6	25.7	7.0	2.2
2008	Port Adelaide	35	13	5	9	158	120	278	84	36	0.4	0.7	12.2	9.2	21.4	6.5	2.8
2009	Port Adelaide	35	18	7	7	219	166	385	127	47	0.4	0.4	12.2	9.2	21.4	7.1	2.6
2010	Port Adelaide	35	14	4	0	130	109	239	58	30	0.3	0.0	9.3	7.8	17.1	4.1	2.1
2011	Port Adelaide	35	9	10	9	80	46	126	47	19	1.1	1.0	8.9	5.1	14.0	5.2	2.1
2012	Greater Western Sydney	11	16	4	3	181	136	317	103	36	0.3	0.2	11.3	8.5	19.8	6.4	2.3
Career			255	179	165	3106	1530	4636	1646	457	0.7	0.6	12.2	6.0	18.2	6.5	1.8

== Honours and achievements ==
**Brownlow Medal votes**
Season	Votes
1999	0
2000	1
2001	0
2002	3
2003	3
2004	22
2005	0
2006	4
2007	12
2008	0
2009	3
2010	0
2011	0
2012	2
**Total**	**50**
Key:
Green / **Bold** = Won

Team

- AFL Premiership (Port Adelaide): 2004
- AFL McClelland Trophy (Port Adelaide): 2002, 2003, 2004
- AFL Pre Season Cup (Port Adelaide): 2001, 2002

Individual

- 3rd Brownlow Medal 2004
- All-Australian: 2004, 2007
- AFL Rising Star Nomination: 2000
- Port Adelaide F.C. Vice Captain: 2006–2008
- Port Adelaide F.C. Most Improved Player: 2002
- Port Adelaide F.C. Best Finals Player: 2005
- West End Showdown Medal XXI: 2006
- Peter Badcoe VC Medal 2007 round 5
- SANFL Hall Of Fame Inductee: 2014
- PAFC Hall of Fame Inductee 2023
