= Brenton Whittle =

Australian actor

- Born: Australia
- Occupations: Actor, TV presenter, playwright, director
- Years active: 1969–present
- Notable work: Sara Dane (1982)

Brenton Whittle is an Australian actor, TV presenter, playwright and director.

== Career ==
Whittle's acting career began on stage, with a 1969 production of Boeing-Boeing, in Adelaide. He first appeared on screen alongside Jenny Agutter, in 1981 supernatural horror film The Survivor, in the role of Thornton. The following year, he played convict overseer Jeremy Hogan in Sara Dane, winning the 1983 Logie Award for Best Lead Actor in a Miniseries or Telemovie for his performance.

In 1987, Whittle had a role in war drama film The Lighthorsemen, opposite Peter Phelps, Gary Sweet and Bill Kerr. Then in 1991, Whittle began a ten year co-hosting role, together with Lyn Weston, for children's series The Book Place, which lasted ten years. During this time he voiced several animal characters in 1995 family film Napoleon. He also had a role in 1996 Academy Award-nominated biographical drama film Shine alongside Noah Taylor, which featured Geoffrey Rush in his Academy Award-winning performance as David Helfgott.

In 2007, Whittle guested in a season 7 episode of drama series McLeod's Daughters. That same year, he appeared with Rachel Ward in six-part drama miniseries Rain Shadow, playing the role of Kenneth Blake.

Whittle has also had an extensive career in theatre, with a vast history performing with and directing for Adelaide Repertory Theatre. Additionally, he has narrated numerous productions for Australian Classical Youth Ballet. He most recently played Mr Stanley in The Man Who Came to Dinner at Adelaide Repertory Theatre in July 2026.

== Filmography ==
=== Film ===
Year	Title	Role	Notes	Ref
1981	The Survivor	Thornton		
1987	The Lighthorsemen	Padre		
1988	The Dreaming	Barrister		
1988	Sebastian and the Sparrow			
1990	Call Me Mr. Brown	Qantas Official 2		
1995	Napoleon	Owl / Frog / Wombat / Other Wallaby / Desert Mouse (voices)		
1996	Shine	Announcer		

=== Television ===
Year	Title	Role	Notes	Ref
1982	Sara Dane	Jeremy Hogan	Miniseries, 8 episodes	
1983	For the Term of His Natural Life	Captain Best	Miniseries, 1 episode	
1984	Special Squad	Jeff Finnegan	1 episode	
1988	Dusty		Miniseries	
1991–2001	The Book Place	Co-host		
2006	Constructing Australia	Mr Glyde	1 episode	
2007	McLeod's Daughters	James Hall	1 episode	
2007	Rain Shadow	Kenneth Blake	Miniseries, 3 episodes	

== Theatre ==
=== As actor ===
Year	Title	Role	Notes	Ref
1969	Boeing-Boeing		Pioneer Memorial Hall, Adelaide with Pioneer Players	
1970	A Hatful of Rain		Willard Hall, Adelaide with Therry Dramatic Society	
1970	The Devil's Advocate		Arts Theatre, Adelaide with Adelaide Repertory Theatre	
1970	A Man for All Seasons		Willard Hall, Adelaide with Therry Dramatic Society	
1972	Son of God		Maughan Church, Adelaide	
1972	Ballet Season: Giselle Act I / Peter and the Wolf / Le Jardin du Craie / Grand Pas de Deux from Swan Lake / La Danse Des Bouffants	Dancer	Arts Theatre, Adelaide with South Australian National Ballet Company	
1973	The Chocolate Frog and The Old Familiar Juice		University of Adelaide with Stable Productions	
1973	Anne of the Thousand Days		Arts Theatre, Adelaide with Adelaide Repertory Theatre	
1974	All in Good Time		Arts Theatre, Adelaide with Adelaide Repertory Theatre	
1976	Mary of Scotland	Earl of Bothwell	Arts Theatre, Adelaide with Adelaide Repertory Theatre	
1979	Hang Your Clothes on Yonder Bush		Arts Theatre, Adelaide with Adelaide Repertory Theatre	
1982	Only An Orphan Girl		Arts Theatre, Adelaide with Adelaide Repertory Theatre	
1983	Gulls		Space Theatre, Adelaide with The Stage Company	
2001	The Night Before Christmas Carnival of the Animals Triple Bill	Narrator	Her Majesty's Theatre, Adelaide with Australian Classical Youth Ballet	
2002	Alice in Wonderland	Narrator	Dunstan Playhouse, Adelaide with Australian Classical Youth Ballet	
2002	The Nutcracker	Narrator	Festival Theatre, Adelaide with Australian Classical Youth Ballet	
2003	Mary Poppins	Narrator	Festival Theatre, Adelaide with Australian Classical Youth Ballet	
2003	Peter Pan	Narrator	Her Majesty's Theatre, Adelaide with Australian Classical Youth Ballet	
2004	The Perfect Murder		Arts Theatre, Adelaide with Adelaide Repertory Theatre	
2007	A Christmas Carol – The Story of Scrooge		Festival Theatre, Adelaide with Australian Classical Youth Ballet	
2020	A Woman of No Importance	Archdeacon Daubeny	Online – Australia with Adelaide Repertory Theatre	
2026	The Man Who Came to Dinner	Mr Stanley	Adelaide Repertory Theatre	

=== As director/writer ===
Year	Title	Role	Notes	Ref
1971	Schmirz: Boris Vian's Empire Builders	Assistant Stage Manager	Sheridan Theatre, Adelaide with Adelaide Theatre Group	
1975	Who Killed Santa Claus?	Director	Arts Theatre, Adelaide with Adelaide Repertory Theatre	
1976	The Prisoner of Second Avenue	Director	Arts Theatre, Adelaide with Adelaide Repertory Theatre	
1976	6 Rms Riv Vu	Director	Arts Theatre, Adelaide with Adelaide Repertory Theatre	
2005	The Tower	Director	Arts Theatre, Adelaide with Adelaide Repertory Theatre	
2019	Well, Shut My Mouth	Writer	Arts Theatre, Adelaide with Adelaide Repertory Theatre	

== Radio ==
Year	Title	Role	Notes	Ref
2020	The Mystic Dr Drake	Shamus Edgeley	Online with Adelaide Repertory Theatre	

== Awards ==
Year	Work	Award	Category	Result	Ref
1983	Sara Dane	Logie Award	Best Lead Actor in a Miniseries or Telemovie	Won	
