= Napoleon (1995 film) =

- Theatrical release poster
- Directed by: Mario Andreacchio
- Written by: Michael Bourchier; Mario Andreacchio; Mark Saltzman
- Produced by: Michael Bourchier; Mario Andreacchio
- Starring: Jamie Croft; Philip Quast
- Cinematography: Roger Dowling
- Edited by: Edward McQueen-Mason
- Music by: Bill Conti
- Production companies: Blink Films; Adelaide Motion Picture Company; Australian Film Finance Corporation; Nippon-Herald Films; Pony Canyon
- Distributed by: WEA Corp. Columbia TriStar Film Distributors International
- Release date: 1995
- Running time: 81 minutes
- Country: Australia
- Language: English
- Budget: Approximately $4.3 million

Napoleon is a 1995 Australian family adventure film about a Golden Retriever puppy who runs away from his city home to fulfil his dream of living with the wild dogs.

== Plot ==
In Sydney, Australia, a puppy named Muffin lives with a human family and his own mother. Calling himself 'Napoleon' and adopting a brave persona, he wishes that he could live with the wild dogs. When the family has a party, Napoleon climbs inside a basket with balloons strapped to it, causing the basket to float away.

A galah named Birdo appears and helps Napoleon descend by popping the balloons. He lands unharmed, and hoping to find the wild dogs, heads into a nearby forest. He encounters a cat, who thinks Napoleon is a mouse and gives chase. When a Tawny frogmouth pushes the cat into a pond, Napoleon escapes and the cat swears revenge.

The next morning, Napoleon meets with Birdo, for advice on how to live in the wild. Birdo teaches Napoleon how to swim, hunt and distinguish friendly animals from dangerous ones. Napoleon gets into a few scrapes narrowly avoiding a herd of stampeding brumbies and then a bushfire in a cane field. The cat returns and tries to attack Birdo and his flock, but Napoleon rescues them. The pair eventually part ways, as Napoleon wants to seek the wild dogs and Birdo wants to rejoin his flock.

Napoleon runs for shelter when a storm floods the area. He discovers two dingo puppies named Sid and Nancy inside a cave. Water floods the cave, sweeping Nancy away, but Napoleon rescues her. When the pups' mother returns, Napoleon realises that he has finally found the wild dogs. He explains that he wanted to feel brave by living in the wild, but confesses to being disappointed with the lifestyle. The pups' mother tells him he has the true spirit of the wild dogs, because his courage led him there and he saved Sid and Nancy.

Intent on returning home, Napoleon travels to the shore by kangaroo and discovers a penguin called Conan in his basket. That night, the cat returns. When Conan intervenes, Napoleon knocks the cat off the cliff and into the basket, which sails away. Birdo reappears with a sea turtle, who takes Napoleon back to his family in Sydney, where his mother agrees to call him 'Napoleon'. The cat, meanwhile, vows revenge.

== Voice cast ==
=== Original Australian cast ===
- Jamie Croft as Napoleon
- Philip Quast as Birdo
- Carole Skinner as the Cat
- Mignon Kent as Nancy
- Michael Wilkop as Sid
- Susan Lyons as Penny, Napoleon's mother / Other Wallaby
- Dame Edna Everage as Kangaroo
- Catherine Lambert as Lorikeet / Rabbit
- Tracey Canini as Lorikeet / Rabbit
- Annabel Sims as Lorikeet / Rabbit
- Lucia Mastrantone as Lone Lorikeet
- Frank Whitten as Koala
- David Argue as Galah / Frill-Necked Lizard
- Steven Vidler as Snake / Galah / Desert Mouse / Turtle
- Anne-Louise Lambert as Spider / Earless Wallaby / Desert Mouse
- Brenton Whittle as Owl / Frog / Wombat / Other Wallaby / Desert Mouse
- Stuart Zagnit as Penguin

== Production ==
Napoleon was directed by Mario Andreacchio, and written by Michael Bourchier, Andreacchio, and Mark Saltzman. Andreacchio and Bourchier also produced. Bill Conti composed the soundtrack.

With a budget of approximately $4.3 million, the film was the most expensive independent production to be made in South Australia at the time of production. Director Mario Andreacchio was inspired to make it after watching The Adventures of Milo and Otis with his children.

During the shoot, 64 different dogs played the title role.

== Songs ==
Original songs performed in the film include:

No.	Title	Performer(s)	Length
1.	"How Far I'll Fly"	Jamie Croft
2.	"Muffin"	Brenton Whittle & Chorus
3.	"Wild Dog"	Philip Quast & Chorus
4.	"My Hills to Climb"	Jamie Croft & Philip Quast
5.	"Kangaroo La Roo"	Dame Edna Everage
6.	"How Far I'll Fly (Reprise)"	Timothy B. Schmit

== Release ==
The film grossed 2,051,855 Australian Dollars at the box office in Australia during 1995. In Japan, it opened on 87 screens during late February under the name Kulta, Finnish for 'gold'. According to Andreacchio, the Japanese public mistook the original English title for a kind of brandy.

The film was released on VHS in the United States, with a different dub, on 11 August 1998 by Metro-Goldwyn-Mayer.

The film later screened at the 2000 Saint Tropez Film Festival and the 2004 London Australian Film Festival.

== Reception ==
In the US, the film received no advance screenings for critics. It however received three stars out of four from the New York Daily News, with film critic Jami Bernard calling it: "a charming and delightful children's movie" and saying: "this Australian movie puts human voices in the mouths of animals, often to hilarious effect. Although the puppy's voice is disappointingly generic, a parrot named Birdo Lucci, voiced by Philip Quast, is a triumph of screeches and self-deprecation."

In a review for Variety magazine, Australian film critic David Stratton from At the Movies wrote: "Well and truly pipped at the post by the more inventive, witty and technically assured Babe, this 1994 co-production... could entrance moppet audiences with its disarmingly naive tale of a lively golden retriever puppy... Artful use of a large variety of animals and sometimes breathtaking photography are undermined by formulaic plotting and some strident voicing. Classic cult status will elude this animal odyssey." He went on to say: "a few arcane film-buff in-jokes are likely to pass way over the heads of most viewers", before adding "Production values are top-drawer, and Adelaide-based filmmaker Mario Andreacchio, better known for his action films, has done the best possible job given the concept and resources. Main kudos here are reserved for the skilled animal trainers, and for the sterling work of cinematographer Roger Dowling."

== See also ==
- Cinema of Australia
- South Australian Film Corporation
