= Leon Byner =

Australian broadcaster (1948–2025)

Leon Byner OAM
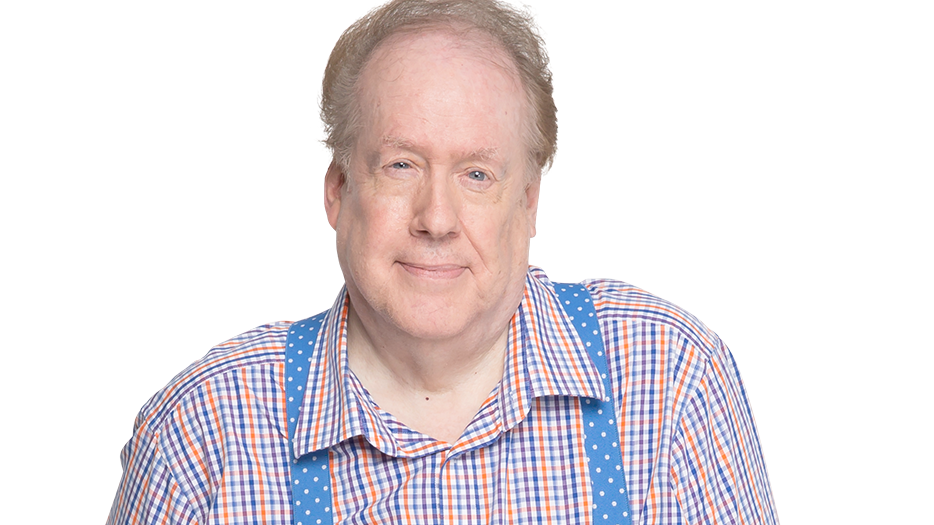
- Born: Leon Robert Byner; 16 September 1948; Melbourne, Victoria, Australia
- Died: 11 November 2025 (aged 77); Adelaide, South Australia, Australia
- Occupation: Talkback radio presenter
- Employer: 5AA/ Nova Entertainment

Leon Robert Byner, OAM (17 September 1948 – 11 November 2025) was an Australian broadcaster who started his radio career in 1966 in Shepparton, Victoria. He worked in Sydney, Brisbane,Canberra, Melbourne, Perth and Hobart. Byner had been at 5AA for over two decades hosting a top rating morning talk show on radio station 5AA Adelaide and nine radio Macquarie affiliates in country South Australia.

== Career ==
During his career, Byner has worked on radio in every Australian state capital. He switched from music presentation to talk radio in 1996, and his career included a couple of stints on Los Angeles talk stations in California.

Byner also presented segments for Adelaide, Brisbane local television and satellite TV Europe on Australian and international celebrities.

He was nominated 13 times for ACRA awards (best talk and current affairs) and Australian of the Year three times.

Byner retired from 5AA on 2 December 2022.

He was awarded the Medal of the Order of Australia (OAM) for "service to radio broadcast media" in the 2023 King's Birthday Honours on 11 June 2023.

== ACMA investigation ==
On 25 October 2011, ACMA found that on 1 October 2010, Byner's show had breached the Commercial Radio Codes by presenting a paid advertisement to promote water purifiers as a current affairs item regarding the "dangers" of water fluoridation. FIVEaa were also found to have breached the complaint handling provisions as directed by the code. Byner had previously been suspended from 5AA for eight weeks in 2004 when he had been found to have not disclosed financial arrangements with businesses.

== Death ==
Byner died from acute leukaemia on 11 November 2025, at the age of 77.
