= Mike Smithson (Australian journalist) =

Australian journalist

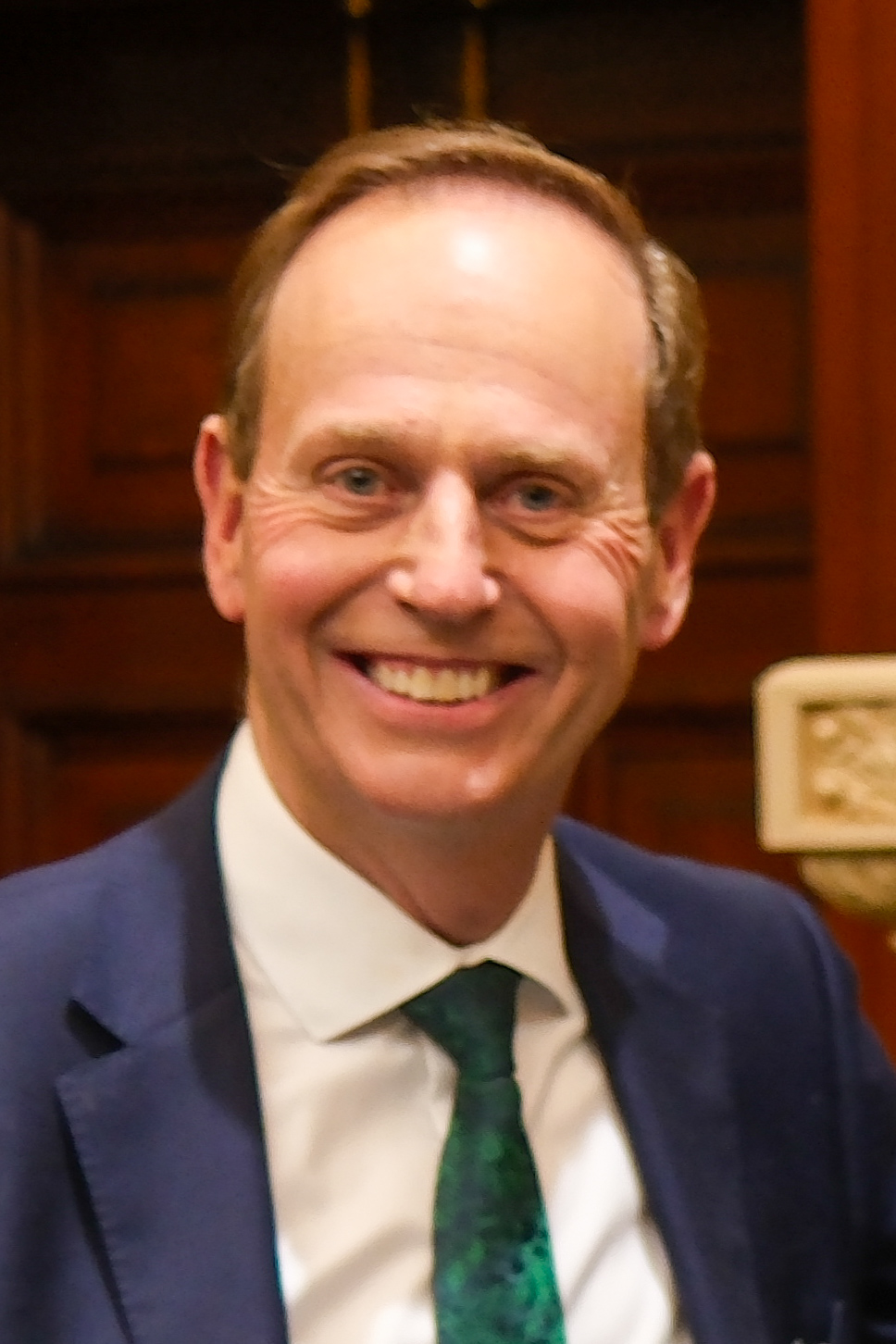
- Smithson in 2026
- Born: Michael Grant Smithson; 26 November 1956 (age 69)
- Occupations: Journalist; news presenter; political commentator; columnist
- Employers: Seven Network; InDaily
- Spouse: Fiona Smithson
- Children: 2
- Awards: South Australian Journalist of the Year (2007)

Michael Grant Smithson (born 26 November 1956) is an Australian political reporter and journalist. He is a presenter for Seven News in Adelaide, South Australia, Australia and can be heard on Adelaide radio station FIVEaa discussing political events with Leon Byner.

== Career ==
Smithson started his career in print media with Messenger Newspapers in the mid-1970s. He later moved to television joining the Seven News in Adelaide, later becoming the senior police reporter with Seven News in Melbourne. Mike returned to Adelaide and became Network Ten's first weekend newsreader before becoming a bureau chief with the Hinch and Real Life programs. He has previously been brief host of Today Tonight Adelaide and European Correspondent.

Some of his biggest reporting stories have included the Skase Chase, the 2000 Summer Olympics and the war on terror in Afghanistan.

In 2007, Smithson won 3 awards at the SA Media Awards: the inaugural award for Commentary, Analysis, Opinion & Critique for his work with the Sunday Mail, Best TV news report and the title of Journalist of the Year.

Smithson is a regular fill in presenter on 5AA.

== Personal life ==
Smithson is married to Fiona and they have two children, Matt and Emma.

Smithson's wife Fiona is the sister of retired Seven News presenter John Riddell
