= Graham Cornes =

Australian rules footballer and coach

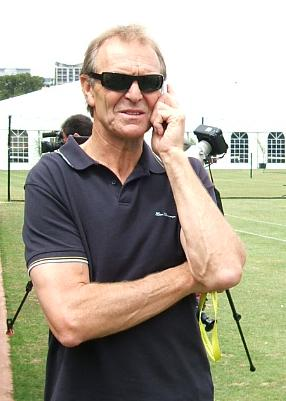

Personal information
- Full name: Graham Studley Cornes OAM
- Born: 31 March 1948 (age 78); Melbourne, Victoria
- Height: 189 cm (6 ft 2 in)
- Weight: 76 kg (168 lb)
- Positions: Ruck Rover, Centre half-forward

Playing career^{1}
Years	Club	Games (Goals)
1967–82	Glenelg	317 (339)
1979	North Melbourne	5 (10)
1983–84	South Adelaide	47 (42)
Total		369 (391)

Representative team honours
Years	Team	Games (Goals)
	South Australia	21 (?)

Coaching career
Years	Club	Games (W–L–D)
1983–84	South Adelaide	46 (25–21–0)
1985–90	Glenelg	149 (94–54–1)
1986–1999	South Australia	11 (9–2–0)
1991–94	Adelaide	89 (43–45–1)
Total		395 (171–122–2)
- ^{1} Playing statistics correct to the end of 1994.

Career highlights
- SANFL: SANFL premiership: 1973; 3x Glenelg best and fairest; Glenelg Captain: 1978; South Adelaide playing coach: 1983–84; Nine times Advertiser Team of the Year; Glenelg Hall of Fame; Representative: Tassie Medal: 1980; 2x All-Australian team: 1979, 1980; Simpson Medal: 1979; Overall: Australian Football Hall of Fame; South Australian Football Hall of Fame (inaugural inductee); Coaching: 2x National Football Carnival Championship: 1988, 1993; 2x SANFL premiership: 1985, 1986; 2x All-Australian team: 1987, 1988

Graham Studley Cornes OAM (born 31 March 1948 in Melbourne, Victoria) is a former Australian rules footballer and coach, as well as a media personality. From 1995 until early 2013, Cornes co-hosted a weekday drivetime sports program that he hosts on Adelaide radio station 5AA, first with Ken "KG" Cunningham and, following Cunningham's retirement in 2008, with Stephen Rowe. In 2012 he was inducted into the Australian Football Hall of Fame.

Cornes is also a Vietnam veteran, having served as an infantry soldier with the 7th Battalion of the Royal Australian Regiment in 1968.

== Playing career ==
Cornes was a champion with the Glenelg Football Club in the SANFL, between 1967 and 1982. He played mostly at Ruck Rover in the SANFL and centre half-forward. In his 317 club games for Glenelg he kicked 339 goals and won the club best and fairest award three times. He captained Glenelg in 1978 and was a member of the premiership team in 1973, taking a spectacular mark in the last minutes of the game and calmly kicking the goal to regain the lead.

In 1977 Cornes took a memorable spectacular mark against Norwood which is captured in Jamie Cooper's painting the Game That Made Australia, commissioned by the AFL in 2008 to celebrate the 150th anniversary of the sport.

Cornes signed with the VFL's South Melbourne in Victoria early in his career, but stayed in South Australia. He made his VFL debut at the age of 31 in 1979 and played five games with Ron Barassi's North Melbourne before returning to South Australia after he was dropped from the team. Most South Australians thought that he was played out of position in the VFL having made his name in South Australia as a Ruck Rover.

As playing coach with South Adelaide he played 47 games in 1983–1984.

Cornes represented South Australia 21 times, including as captain in 1978. He was selected in the All-Australian team in 1979 and 1980, winning the Tassie Medal in 1980 and the Simpson Medal in 1979. playing as a Ruck Rover.

== Coaching career ==
Cornes was the playing coach of South Adelaide in 1983 and 1984, finishing fifth both years. He then retired as a player, but returned to Glenelg in 1985 as coach. He had an immediate impact, winning premierships in 1985 and 1986 and also taking them to three losing Grand Finals in 1987, 1988 and 1990.

Cornes had a very good record in State of Origin matches, boasting nine wins from eleven matches including six wins from eight matches coaching the South Australia team against Victoria. He was the All-Australian coach in 1987 and 1988.

In 1991, Cornes was appointed the inaugural senior coach of the Adelaide Football Club in their first year in the AFL. The Crows in its inaugural year under Cornes finished ninth at the end of 1991 season and ninth again at the end of the 1992 season. Cornes guided the Crows to their first finals appearance in 1993, where they finished third at the end of the 1993 season. They made it to the preliminary final against Essendon and led at half-time by 42 points. But inspired by the brilliance of Michael Long, the Bombers mounted an amazing comeback to win the game by 11 points. However, the Crows finished eleventh in 1994 and at the end of the season, Cornes was replaced by Robert Shaw because the club wanted a new coach.

== Head coaching record ==
Team	Year	Home and Away Season					Finals			
Team	Year	Won	Lost	Drew	%	Position	Won	Lost	Win %	Result
ADE	1991	10	12	0	.455	9th out of 15	—	—	—	—
ADE	1992	11	11	0	.500	9th out of 15	—	—	—	—
ADE	1993	12	8	0	.600	5th out of 15	1	2	.333	Lost to Essendon in Preliminary Final
ADE	1994	9	12	1	.432	11th out of 15	—	—	—	—
Total		42	43	1	.494		1	2	.333	

== Post-football ==
Cornes is now a football media personality, having appeared on the Seven Network's football coverage during the 1990s, and co hosting the FIVEaa Sports Show with, first K. G. Cunningham from 1995 to 2008, and then former Adelaide Crow Stephen Rowe, 2009 to April 2013. Since retirement he has hosted a conversations program, "Conversations with Cornesy", and is also back with K. G Cunningham on FIVE aa's Saturday Morning Sports Show. He has been a long-time News Limited columnist. He has also coached the All Stars in an E. J. Whitten Legends Game. Cornes was also the centrepiece of Cornesy's Allstar Rock Band (formerly known as the 5AA Rock-n-Roll Allstars), in which he plays guitar and does some vocals. Other members of this Adelaide-based band are Greg Mallen, Simon Wilson, David Heath, Dean Fioretti, Travis and Rob Dragani, and "Polly" Politis. In 2007, Cornes argued for the return of State of Origin in Australian football. He cited the success of the annual New South Wales–Queensland series in the National Rugby League (NRL) and blamed the narrow-mindedness of clubs and coaches for undermining the concept in Australian football.

== Personal life ==
Cornes' sons Chad and Kane became players for the Port Adelaide Football Club in the AFL. He has been married three times, currently married to Nicole Cornes, whom he met when she was a secretary at radio station 5AA. Cornes and his wife have three daughters.

In 1968, he was drafted under the National Service Act 1964 and served in Vietnam as an infantry soldier with the 7th Battalion of the Royal Australian Regiment. He remains active with several veterans groups.

Cornes does not drink alcohol.

== See also ==
- 1977 SANFL Grand Final
