= The Book Place =

- Genre: Children's television
- Presented by: Lynn Weston (1991-2001); Brenton Whittle (1991-2001); Andy Armstrong (1991-2001); Nuala Hafner (1997-2003); Pete Michell (2002-2003); Amelia McFarlane (2002-2003)
- Country of origin: Australia
- Original language: English
- No. of seasons: 10

Production
- Production locations: Adelaide, South Australia
- Running time: 30 minutes
- Production company: SAS7

Original release
- Network: Seven Network
- Release: 30 December 1991 – 2003

The Book Place is an Australian educational television show for children, which aired on the Seven Network from 1991 to 2003. The show was originally presented by former host of Fat Cat and Friends, Lynn Weston with Brenton Whittle, and Andy Armstrong, with Michael Scheld as the Bookworm. Television and media personality Nuala Hafner joined the cast in 1997, while Pete Michell and Amelia McFarlane replaced departing cast members in 2002.

== See also ==
- Between the Lions
