= Pick Your Face =

- Genre: Children's Game Show
- Presented by: Angus Smallwood
- Country of origin: Australia
- Original language: English
- No. of seasons: 5
- No. of episodes: 195

Production
- Production locations: Adelaide, South Australia
- Running time: 21 minutes
- Production company: Banksia Productions

Original release
- Network: Nine Network
- Release: 9 May 1999 – 2003

Pick Your Face is an Australia game show created by Banksia Productions for the Nine Network that ran from 1999 until 2003 and rerun on the Disney Channel from 2005 until 2009. It was hosted by Angus Smallwood.

== Format ==
=== Round 1 ===
Contestants had to remove items that served as clues from a large fake nose which, when gathered together would make the name of a celebrity.

=== Round 2 – Place the Face (Part 1) ===
Player one would move to the rear of the studio and play a game where they had four celebrity faces (originally three celebrities and the fourth being the player themselves) with the eyes, nose, and mouth each cut out and posted randomly around the outside of the board. The object being to put them back together in 60 seconds and getting points for guessing the celebrity successfully.

=== Round 3 – The Morph Mobile ===
Each player looked at their own photo as it slowly transformed into the face of a celebrity with more points being earned the quicker the player solved the puzzle. Each player had 30 seconds.

=== Place The Face (Part 2) ===
The second player got their opportunity to play Place The Face, as above with the same celebrities (but their own face as the fourth picture as before).

=== Round 4 ===
All three players were presented with a photograph of a celebrity upon which cartoonish, grotesque features were superimposed. The players asked questions in a yes or no answer format which when answered with a yes removed the additional facial features until a contestant correctly guessed the name of the celebrity.

=== Place The Face (Part 3) ===
The third player played Place the Face as above.

=== Round 5 – Face Off ===
A trivia round where the buzzer was a touch activated giant eyeball.

== Production ==
It was reported in Adelaide's Advertiser that some filming sessions were affected by heatwaves that hit the city in January 1999 and producers pleaded with audiences to attend.

It was also reported that Banksia Productions was in negotiation with Fox Kids in the United States to produce an American version of Pick Your Face with American contestants and host, but filmed in Adelaide.
