= C'mon Kids (TV series) =

- Genre: Children's television series
- Country of origin: Australia
- Original language: English
- No. of seasons: 5

Production
- Production locations: Adelaide, South Australia

Original release
- Network: Nine Network
- Release: 1986 – 1990

C'Mon Kids was an Australian children's television show which screened on the Nine Network from 1986 to 1990. It was produced in Adelaide, South Australia and screened on weekday afternoons.

== Synopsis ==
The show had a number of hosts or presenters who were accompanied by puppet co-hosts Winky Dink, a puppet portrayed/voiced by actress Wendy Patching or Frank Duck, portrayed/voiced by actor Maurie Annese.

The show consisted of small educational editorials presented in a variety of segments and cartoons. The segments featured a number of regular presenters and reporters including Robin Roenfeldt, Tammy Macintosh, Narelle Higson, Joanna Moore, Vicki Radenge, Stephanie Raethal and Mark Fantasia.

== See also ==
- List of Australian television series
- Wombat
- Fat Cat and Friends
- Play School
