= Kevin Crease =

South Australian television presenter and news presenter

- Born: 8 May 1936; North Adelaide, South Australia, Australia
- Died: 12 April 2007 (aged 70); Queen Elizabeth Hospital Woodville, South Australia, Australia
- Occupation: Television presenter
- Years active: 1957−2006
- Children: 4

Kevin John Crease (8 May 1936 – 12 April 2007) was a South Australian television presenter and news presenter. He was most noted for presenting South Australian edition of the Nine Network's National Nine News with Rob Kelvin between 1987 and 2007.

== Early life ==
Born in North Adelaide and raised in the working class seaside suburb of Semaphore, Crease was the eldest of four children. He was a prodigious public speaker from a young age and won the Year 7 senior school debating championship.

He started his working life as a clerical worker in 1952 with Shell before becoming a copy boy and later cadet at Adelaide's The News newspaper, where he quickly "fell foul of the chief-of-staff" and was sacked. Crease completed his national service, but resigned from the army following an incident where he used an armoured car to attend a party with his girlfriend.

== Professional career ==
Crease started his radio career at radio station 5DN in 1957 after being noticed as a spruiker selling plastic raincoats in Adelaide's city streets. On 17 July 1959, Channel 9 began its first broadcast in Adelaide. Crease was chosen to compere the station's first program – Clarkson's TV Hostess Quest. During the 1960s, he worked on a variety of different projects, from reading commercials and news, to performing on Adelaide Tonight as compere from 1962 to 1975. In the early 1970s, he hosted the news program News Beat.

From 1975 to 1977, Crease was then Premier of South Australia Don Dunstan's press secretary before returning to television. He went on to present news for ADS-7. 1983 saw the release of his children's book Sam and the Dreamtime, which was set in his home city of Adelaide and included illustrations by John Draper and photographs by Crease. He returned to Channel 9 in April 1987 as presenter for National Nine News with Rob Kelvin. Together, the pair would enjoy considerable ratings success, taking Nine News Adelaide to the top of the ratings in the 1990s.

On 9 February 2007, co-host Rob Kelvin announced that Crease was going through a serious health issue and was taking extended leave from presenting. It was revealed on 17 March 2007 on National Nine News that he was suffering from a 'serious form of cancer'. The Sunday Mail reported the following day that Crease would be retiring from television broadcasting.

== Death ==
Crease died on 12 April 2007, aged 70 at the Queen Elizabeth Hospital.

== Honours ==
Following his death, Crease was posthumously inducted into the South Australian Media Hall of Fame. The award was accepted by his son, Tom Crease, at the awards ceremony held 28 April 2007, at the Adelaide Festival Centre. Later that week NWS-9 aired Farewell Creasey which was the top rating program in Adelaide for the week.

== Personal life ==
He had three children with his first wife Josie. He was also the father with his second wife Cathy of Frenzal Rhomb bassist Tom Crease.

Media offices
Preceded by Rob Kelvin with Caroline Ainsle	Nine News Adelaide; Weeknight presenter with Rob Kelvin; 1987–2007	Succeeded by Rob Kelvin with Kelly Nestor
