= Humphrey B. Bear =

Australian children's television character

- Here's Humphrey character
- Humphrey B. Bear
- First appearance: 24 May 1965 on Children’s TV show The Channel Niners, with hosts Ian Fairweather and Ann North
- Portrayed by: Edwin Duryea (original)

In-universe information
- Nickname: Humphrey
- Species: Brown bear
- Gender: Male

Humphrey B. Bear is a fictional character first created in an Australian children's television series called Here's Humphrey, which first went to air in 1965. Its fictional character namesake is an icon of Australian children's television. Humphrey B. Bear first aired on Adelaide's NWS-9 on Monday, 24 May 1965. The show became one of the most successful programs for pre-schoolers in Australia. Edwin "Ted" Duryea (c.1930-2009), an actor, singer and dancer, first played the part of Humphrey.

The character of Humphrey is a tall, shaggy honey-loving brown bear with a large, round, shining, glossy black nose, straw boater hat, tartan waist-coat and oversized yellow bow-tie. His television show always features a companion who assists and narrates Humphrey's various adventures in the "magic forest" including his brightly coloured treehouse. In the early days, the character was known as Bear Bear, and was named Humphrey B. Bear as the result of an on-air competition.

== Television show ==
The show has won Logies for Best Children's Series and the Humphrey character has received national awards and commendations, including the "Citizen of the Year" Award at the 1994 Australia Day celebrations. Humphrey B. Bear has viewers all over the world thanks to the United States version of his show shown on PBS in America and the Spanish version shown on Galavision. It has been translated or produced in 55 different languages.

The writers of Humphrey B. Bear, including Anthony O'Donohue (also long-time host of the show), attempt to set up each show as a new adventure for Humphrey. Each episode parallels the needs, encounters and interests of the average young child. The character of Humphrey explores life as they do, trying to reinforce their self-esteem and showing them it's all right to embrace challenges. The series attempts to show it's important to be the best that you can be, and to give things your best shot. The series also encourages the viewer to simply take part in your life, family, community and the world.

On 14 February 2007, it was reported that the Nine Network would record a new Here's Humphrey series for the first time since 2003.

In February 2012, Imagination Ventures, the philanthropic enterprise of media company Imagination Entertainment, purchased the assets of Banksia Productions that included all the rights to the Humphrey B. Bear.

In May 2012 Humphrey was announced as the official "Ambassabear" for the Women & Children's Hospital Foundation. His first major fundraising effort saw the release of a limited edition gift set featuring a Humphrey plush doll and DVD. All proceeds from that product went to the hospitals' Kids FUNd program. Humphrey then started reappearing across Australia, taking part in live shows such as school performances, community events, and birthday parties.

In July 2013 Humphrey returned to national TV screens on television stations in Sydney, Melbourne, Brisbane, Adelaide, and Perth. Humphrey celebrated his 50th anniversary in 2015.

== Ownership ==
In September 2016, OZPIX Entertainment facilitated the acquisition of all the assets and rights to Humphrey B. Bear from Imagination Ventures. Imagination Ventures continues to partner with the Humphrey B. Bear brand.

Village Roadshow Studios now play host to Humphrey B. Bear's new headquarters at their studios on the Gold Coast, Australia.

== Highlights and awards ==
Year	Highlight/Award
1965	A star is born Release of Theme Song #1 Competition to rename "Bear Bear" and the winner is "Humphrey"
1968	First Plush Toy Released
1969	1st Logie Award - Best Children's TV Series
1975	Parents Without Partners Distinguished Service to Children Award
1978	2nd Logie Award - Favourite Children's Personality Gold Record for outstanding sales of "Look There's Humphrey Bear'' Music Record Festival of Light Award
1979	Television Society of Australia Individual Achievement
1982	3rd Logie Award - Best Children's TV Series Penguin Award - Best Children's Personality
1990	Release of Theme Song #2
1994	Citizenship Award Release of Mandarin/Chinese version Release of Theme Song #3
1998	Launch on "Here's Humphrey" USA Series as part of "Someday School" on PBS
1999	Launch of Humphrey Australia Post Postage Stamp Launch of "Hispanic Humphrey" Series on Galavision Humphrey for President Campaign
2003	Humphrey becomes Heritage Listed and a National Trust Icon

Other highlights

Humphrey has been recognised as an icon of Australian television and is featured in the Australian National Museum.

He became the only bear in the world to become a cub when he was initiated into the Scouting Movement.

=== APRA Music Awards ===
Year	Nominated works	Award	Result	Lost to
1999	"Fun With Humphrey" (Peter Douglas, Robert Pippan)	Most Performed Children's Work	Nominated	The Wiggles – "Captain Feathersword Fell Asleep On His Pirate Ship (Quack Quack)"
