= SAS (TV station) =

- Adelaide, South Australia; Australia
- Channels: Digital: 6 (VHF); Virtual: 7
- Branding: Seven

Programming
- Language: English
- Affiliations: Seven (1987–present, O&O)

Ownership
- Owner: Seven Media Group; (Channel Seven Adelaide Pty Ltd)

History
- First air date: 26 July 1965
- Former channel numbers: Analog: 10 (1965–1987); Analog: 7 (1987–2013)
- Former affiliations: Ten (1965–1987)
- Call sign meaning: South; Australian Telecasters; South Australia

Technical information
- Licensing authority: Australian Communications and Media Authority
- ERP: 200 kW (analogue); 50 kW (digital)
- HAAT: 487 m (analogue); 485 m (digital)
- Transmitter coordinates: 34°58′52″S 138°42′29″E

Links
- Website: 7plus.com.au

SAS, formerly SAS-7 and before that SAS-10, is a television station in Adelaide, South Australia. It is part of the Seven Network.

== History ==
SAS-7 was originally known as SAS-10, an affiliate of what became Network Ten. It commenced broadcasting on 26 July 1965, as SA Telecasters. In the early 1970s the station was bought out by Perth station TVW-7 and thus, on two occasions, shared the same image campaigns as TVW's. In 1982, SAS and TVW were bought by the Bell Group.

On 27 December 1987, SAS-10 and Seven Network's original affiliate ADS-7 switched broadcast channels and affiliations, ADS moving to channel 10, SAS moving to channel 7. As the television industry was consolidating in Australia, these channels had each become associated by ownership with interstate stations bearing the opposite channel numbers, so to simplify network interaction, they agreed to swap channel assignments and network affiliations in Adelaide, with SAS being now the Seven Network's youngest. ADS was owned by Kerry Stokes who also owned NEW-10 and Capital Television. As a result, from the last days of 1987 up to 1988, SAS, now on channel 7, adopted the On the Move slogan previously used by WLS-TV in Chicago, Illinois in 1984 to mark the change, with a music video made for this purpose.

In 1988, SAS was sold by the Bell Group to Qintex, bringing the station under common ownership with the Seven stations in the other capital cities.

The station celebrated 40 years in 2005 with a special television program "Made in Adelaide 40 Years of Television".

Television shows made during the SAS-10 era include children's shows Fat Cat and Friends, The Early Bird Show, Crackerjack and Romper Room. Music shows included in Time, Trax and Simulrock. Variety talent shows included Adelaide's New Faces and Pot Luck. There was also the long running daytime show Touch of Elegance. SAS 10 employed actor Hedley Cullen as horror host Deadly Earnest, who was also seen in WA.

From 1973 to 1989 the Christmas Appeal telethon was held each year. For the inaugural Bay to Birdwood classic car run, SAS Channel 10 provided advertising and a documentary after the event.

SA Telecasters also produced the 45-minute documentary On location with Robbery Under Arms, which achieved a sort of permanency as a "special feature" of the DVD transfer of the film Robbery Under Arms, starring Sam Neill.

The game show Wheel of Fortune commenced recordings in ADS-7 studios in July 1981 on the Seven Network. It moved to SAS with the 1987 switch, and continued there until July 1996 when the show moved to ATN-7 Sydney where it lasted to its cancellation in 2006.

Other shows after the changeover included Fat Cat and Friends until 1992 and Trax until 1990.

Currently the station produces Discover and Seven News, while between 1995 and 2019, it produced a local edition of Today Tonight, which outrated the national A Current Affair.

The last edition of Seven News and Today Tonight to be broadcast from the Gilberton studios in North Adelaide took place on 14 December 2007. The station then moved to new premises at Hindmarsh on the corner of Port Road and Adam Street, from where Adelaide versions of Seven News and Today Tonight are produced.

SAS-7 celebrated its Golden Jubilee in 2015.

== Programming ==
=== Current in-house productions ===
- Seven News (Adelaide edition)
- Seven Afternoon News (Adelaide edition)

=== Previous in-house productions ===
- Control Freaks (2001–2003)
- The Book Place (1991–2003)
- Wheel of Fortune (1988–1996)
- Fat Cat and Friends (1972–1987 on SAS-10, 1988–1991 on SAS-7)
- Simulrock (1980s, with SAFM)
- Christmas Telethon
- You Don't Say (1982)
- The Today Show (1960s)
- Romper Room (1965–1974)
- Bobo The Clown (1960s)
- Earlybirds (1970s)
- Touch of Elegance (1968–1990s)
- AM Adelaide
- Today Tonight (1995–2019)

== AFL season ==
During the Australian Football League season, Seven News continues to air at its regular time on Saturdays or Sundays during Fox Footy broadcast twilight matches involving Adelaide and/or Port Adelaide, with football coverage shifting to 7mate; formerly, the bulletin was aired at half-time of the telecast, replacing match analysis from Fox Footy. SAS also airs South Australian National Football League Matches during the Season.

== News and current affairs ==
Seven News Adelaide is directed by Mark Mooney and presented by Rosanna Mangiarelli and Will Goodings on weeknights and Mike Smithson on weekends from Seven's Adelaide studios, located at Hindmarsh. Sport is presented by Mark Soderstrom on weeknights and Bruce Abernethy on weekends. Weather is presented by Casey Treloar on weeknights and Gertie Spurling on weekends.

The Adelaide bulletin is simulcast to the regional areas of South Australia on regional Seven Network stations GTS/BKN in the Spencer Gulf region and Broken Hill in New South Wales, and through WIN South Australia in the Riverland and Mount Gambier/South East regions of the state.

From 1989 to 2004 Graeme Goodings presented Seven News Adelaide on weeknights with Doyle until he was diagnosed with bowel cancer. Goodings and Riddell, the then weekend news presenter, agreed to swap roles, allowing for Goodings' rehabilitation. Goodings left Seven News Adelaide in December 2014, after 34 years reading Adelaide's news.

Prior to 27 December 1987, the presenters and production crew of Seven News Adelaide produced Ten News Adelaide (then known as Ten Eyewitness News). However, as the television industry was consolidating in Australia, these news services had each become associated by ownership with inter-state news services being broadcast on opposite frequencies; therefore, to simplify network interaction, their respective networks agreed to swap channel assignments and network affiliations in Adelaide.

In December 2007, production of Seven News moved from studios located at Gilberton to a new purpose-built space at Hindmarsh.

During the AFL season, Seven News Adelaide does not air at the regular time on Saturday or Sunday if there is a twilight match involving Adelaide and/or Port Adelaide, in which case, a shortened edition is broadcast at half time, replacing analysis of the AFL matches broadcast, or a full bulletin is broadcast immediately after the game.

In 2014, Seven News Adelaide won every single ratings weeknight against the rival Nine News Adelaide, but in 2015 started to lose some nights to Nine as Seven News as a whole suffered its worst ratings figures for over a decade. It clocked up 500 consecutive weekly ratings wins in March 2019, extending a streak which started in August 2006.

In August 2019, Jane Doyle celebrated 30 years of reading the news on Seven.

In November 2019, John Riddell announced his retirement and presented his last bulletin on 6 December. Doyle became solo presenter after Ridell's retirement.

In June 2020, it was announced that Jessica Adamson and Tim Noonan were made redundant. The weekday 4pm bulletin was also retired with Melbourne's bulletin broadcast to the Adelaide market. Rosanna Mangiarelli replaced Adamson on weekends. The bulletin was later reinstated on 26 October, but the axing affected Seven News in the Adelaide ratings, and helped rival Nine News to close the afternoon and evening news gap with Seven ever since.

In September 2022, it was announced that FIVEAA's Will Goodings will replace Mike Smithson to co-host weekends.

In November 2022, it was announced that Jane Doyle would retire from television after more than three decades presenting 7NEWS Adelaide. Will Goodings and Rosanna Mangiarelli were announced as her replacement, commencing from January 2023.

Fill-in presenters include Mike Smithson, Sarah Cumming, Gertie Spurling and Elspeth Hussey (News), Bruce Abernethy, Tom Wilson and Andrew Hayes (Sport) and Gertie Spurling, Emily Beaton and Hanni Howe (Weather). News updates are presented by presenters or fill-in presenters.

As of 2020, Seven has remained South Australia's number one Adelaide news service for more than a decade.

=== Presenters ===
Current presenters
Role	Bulletins						
Role	Monday	Tuesday	Wednesday	Thursday	Friday	Saturday	Sunday
News	Will Goodings (2023–present); Rosanna Mangiarelli (2023–present)					Mike Smithson (2021–22; 2023–present)	
Sport	Mark Soderstrom (2020–present)					Bruce Abernethy (2020–present)	
Weather	Casey Treloar (2026–present)					Gertie Spurling (2021–present)	

== See also ==
- Television broadcasting in Australia
