= FIVEAA =

Radio station in Adelaide, South Australia

FIVEAA (5AA)
- Adelaide, South Australia; Australia
- Broadcast area: Adelaide RA1
- Frequency: 1395 kHz AM (also on DAB+)

Programming
- Language: English
- Format: Talkback radio

Ownership
- Owner: Nova Entertainment; (Festival City Broadcasters Pty Ltd)
- Sister stations: Nova 91.9, Nova Throwbacks, Coles Radio, smoothfm, smooth 80s

History
- First air date: 14 March 1976
- Call sign meaning: Adelaide Australia, 5 for South Australia

Technical information
- Licensing authority: ACMA
- Power: 1,200 watts
- Transmitter coordinates: 34.757511°S 138.608478°E

Links
- Public licence information: Profile
- Webcast: Listen Live
- Website: fiveaa.com.au

FIVEAA (pronounced Five Double A; callsign 5AA) is Adelaide's only commercial talkback radio station. The station has a range of programs including news, sports, current affairs, social issues, football calls, gardening, lifestyle, cars, travel and health. It is owned by Nova Entertainment.

== History ==
5AA commenced service in Kent Town on 14 March 1976 on the frequency 1390 AM. It was moved to 1386 AM with the introduction of 9 kHz spacing on the AM dial in 1978. The station now broadcasts on 1395 AM.

5AA commenced its life with a "Beautiful Music" format and quickly became Adelaide's number-1-rated radio station. In 1976, the only FM competition was ABC Classic FM. AM stations were ABC Radio, 5DN and music stations 5KA and 5AD.

In the 1980s, 5AA was sold to the State Government owned TAB betting agency, ditching music to begin broadcasting horse and dog racing, with talkback in between race calls. The station shifted to the TAB headquarters in Pulteney Court, Adelaide, with "Talk of the Town" as its slogan. However, it plummeted in popularity as a result of its broadcasting policy. With the advent of narrowcast licences, the TAB purchased frequency 1539AM and shifted all racing there, freeing up 5AA for talk and interviews.

A new slogan was adopted in the early 1990s; "5AA, Where you don't miss a thing" and the station began a slow rise in the ratings to challenge ABC Radio and 5DN.

On 27 September 1996, 5AA was separated from the TAB and sold by the Government of South Australia as part of its asset sales program to repay state debt, 5 years after the $3 billion collapse of the State Bank. The new owner was DMG Radio Australia, with CEO Paul Thompson, which had national headquarters in Adelaide.

In 2000, another new logo was adopted with the slogan "Interactive Radio FIVEaa".

In October 2004, the station shifted to new premises in Hindmarsh Square alongside Nova 919, also owned by DMG Radio Australia, which had launched two months earlier.

In November 2009 DMG sold 50% of the station to Lachlan Murdoch's company Illyria, with Thompson becoming non-executive chairman for six months. When Nova itself was acquired by Illyria in September 2012, it became the sole owner of the station.

In March 2024, FIVEAA rebranded with a new logo.

In 2025 FIVEAA Breakfast raised over $200'000 for Catherine House & The Hutt St Centre through the FIVEAA Breakfast Undie Drive.

In November 2025 Long-time Adelaide radio presenter Leon Byner died at the age of 77 following a battle with leukaemia.

In July 2026 David Penberthy announced he would take 6 months off to travel to Spain with his family.

== FIVEAA in 2026 ==
Current FIVEAA Programs
Time	Monday - Friday (weekday)	Saturday & Sunday (weekends)
5-6am	Early Breakfast with Ned McHenry and Sam Daddow	Australia Overnight/Best of FIVEAA
6-9am	Breakfast with David Penberthy and Will Goodings	Weekend Breakfast with Michael Keelan and Angie McBride
9am-12pm	Mornings with Graeme Goodings	Saturday Sports Show with Ken Cunningham & Graham Cornes
12-1pm	Conversations with Cornesy	The Sunday Roast with Ken Cunningham and Sam Tugwell
1-4pm	Afternoons with Stacey Lee	Saturday Afternoon with Richard Pascoe Sunday Afternoon with Jonathan Edwards
4-6.30pm	Sports Show with Stephen Rowe and Tim Ginever	Saturday Drive with Mel Usher Sunday Drive with Matthew Pantelis
7-11.30pm	Nights with Leith Forrest	Weekend Nights with Andrew Reimer

Other Regular FIVEAA Programs
Weekdays		Summer Weekends	
Time	Program	Time	Program
6.30-7pm Monday	The SANFL Show with Matthew Panos	12- 4pm	Saturday Afternoons with Richard Pascoe Sunday Afternoons with Jonathan Edwards
11:30pm-5am	Australia Overnight	4-7pm	Saturday Sound Track with Mel Usher Sunday Drive with Matthew Pantelis

== FIVEAA Football ==
FIVEAA is one of four radio outlets (the others being ABC Radio Adelaide, SEN 1629 SA and Triple M Adelaide) contracted to cover Australian Football League matches in the Adelaide area.

The station currently commentates every home and away and finals matches involving the Adelaide Crows and the Port Adelaide Power, broadcasting multiple matches per week relayed from sister station 3AW in Melbourne.

Current FIVEAA team (2026)
Commentators	Experts	Boundary Riders
Stephen Rowe	Scott Camporeale	Monique van der Heyden
Tim Ginever	Matt Crouch	Sam Daddow
Tom Rehn	Dean Brogan	
Will Goodings		
Sam Tugwell		
