= City vs Country West End Challenge =

1990 SANFL All-Stars
The Advertiser Country All-Stars	The News City All-Stars
23.15 (153)	14.28 (112)
- Date: 21 May 1990
- Stadium: Football Park
- Umpires: Rick Kinnear, Mark Mackie

Broadcast in Australia
- Network: NWS-9

The City v Country West End Challenge was a one-off all-star game between two representative sides organised by the South Australian National Football League in the absence of a State of Origin game in 1990.

The match was played on 21 May 1990 at Football Park in West Lakes, South Australia, Australia, between The Advertiser Country All-Stars and The News City All-Stars. The Country All-Stars won the match by 41 points.

== Uniforms ==
City All-Stars	Country All-Stars

== Teams ==
=== The Advertiser Country All-Stars ===
Coach: John Cahill

No.	Name	SANFL club	Recruited from
2	Simon Neave	West Torrens	Dudley United/Keith
3	Greg Phillips (c)	Port Adelaide	Port Lincoln
4	Chris Melican	Glenelg	South Gambier
5	Bruce Abernethy	Port Adelaide	Rosewater
6	Craig Dewhirst	South Adelaide	Booborowie Hallett
7	Darren Smith	Port Adelaide	Rudall
8	Darren Mansell	Glenelg	Penola
9	Greg Whittlesea	Sturt	Yankalilla
10	Tony Burgess	West Adelaide	Quorn
11	Simon Tregenza	Port Adelaide	Sacred Heart
12	Scott Lee	Central District	Yallourn, Victoria
13	Peter McIntyre	South Adelaide	Deniliquin
14	Robin McKinnon	West Adelaide	South Gambier
15	David Hynes	Port Adelaide	Wudinna
16	Troy Clarke	West Torrens	South Cairns
17	Des O'Dwyer	Woodville	Shepparton United
18	David Stoeckel	South Adelaide	Dudley United
19	John Seebohm	Glenelg	Mount Burr
20	Michael Redden (vc)	North Adelaide	Orroroo
21	Gilbert McAdam	Central District	South Alice Springs
22	Paul McWilliam	Sturt	Mildura
23	Grantley Fielke	West Adelaide	Loxton
24	Laurence Schache	West Torrens	Hopetoun
26	Richard Champion	Woodville	Kadina

=== The News City All-Stars ===
Coach: Graham Cornes

No.	Name	SANFL club	Originally from
1	Romano Negri	Woodville	North Hobart
2	Andrew Jarman (vc)	Norwood	Gaza
3	Stephen Sims	North Adelaide	Modbury
4	George Fiacchi	Port Adelaide	Rosewater
5	Matthew Liptak	Glenelg	Glenelg Juniors
6	John Fidge	Glenelg	St Peters East Bentleigh (Vic)
7	Andrew Payze	West Torrens	Henley High School
8	Darren Jarman	North Adelaide	Gaza
9	Matthew Robran	Norwood	Marryatville High School
10	Tom Warhurst Jr.	Norwood	St Ignatius' College
11	Justin Staritski	Norwood	Pembroke School
12	Scott Hodges	Port Adelaide	Salisbury West
13	Gary Christie	Glenelg	Marion
14	Nigel Smart	South Adelaide	Christies Beach
16	Stephen Schwerdt	Central District	Elizabeth
17	Allan Schwartz	West Torrens	West Torrens Juniors
18	Allen Jakovich	Woodville	Southern Districts (NT)
19	Stephen Williams	Port Adelaide	West Adelaide
20	David Brown	Port Adelaide	Ethelton
21	Trevor Clisby	North Adelaide	Modbury
22	Bruce Lindsay (c)	West Torrens	Modbury
23	John Paynter	Sturt	Brighton High School
24	Michael Bennett	South Adelaide	Sturt
25	Robbie Thompson	Glenelg	Seacombe High School
27	David Hutton	Port Adelaide	Port Adelaide Juniors

== Best on ground award ==
The Fos Williams Medal for best on ground was awarded to Andrew Jarman.

== Aftermath and legacy ==
=== Start of AFL Era ===
This match is notable as it was the final representative game involving the SANFL prior to the introduction of the Adelaide Football Club in the Australian Football League the following season. 30 players from this game were included on AFL lists in 1991, along with the coach of the City All-Stars, Graham Cornes being appointed the inaugural coach of Adelaide. Overall, 1,869 AFL games would be amassed following this event from players who played in this game.

==== Adelaide Football Club Inaugural Squad 1991 ====
Name	1991 Club	Later Club	Post-1990 AFL Games
Bruce Abernethy	Adelaide Crows		11
David Brown	Adelaide Crows	Port Adelaide Power	91
Trevor Clisby	Adelaide Crows		0
Grantley Fielke	Adelaide Crows		24
Scott Hodges	Adelaide Crows	Port Adelaide Power	38
Andrew Jarman	Adelaide Crows		110
Scott Lee	Adelaide Crows		86
Bruce Lindsay	Adelaide Crows		6
Matthew Liptak	Adelaide Crows		116
Peter McIntyre	Adelaide Crows		14
Romano Negri	Adelaide Crows		6
Andrew Payze	Adelaide Crows		14
Alan Schwartz	Adelaide Crows		0
Stephen Schwerdt	Adelaide Crows		25
Nigel Smart	Adelaide Crows		278
Darren Smith	Adelaide Crows		9
Robbie Thompson	Adelaide Crows		5
Simon Tregenza	Adelaide Crows		106
Tom Warhurst Jr.	Adelaide Crows		2

==== Other AFL Clubs ====
Name	1991 Club	Later club	Post-1990 AFL Games
Richard Champion	Brisbane Bears	Brisbane Lions	183
Troy Clarke	Brisbane Bears		68
John Fidge	Essendon Bombers		0
David Hynes	West Coast Eagles	Fremantle Dockers	86
Allen Jakovich	Melbourne Demons	Footscray Bulldogs	54
Darren Jarman	Hawthorn Hawks	Adelaide Crows	230
Gilbert McAdam	St Kilda Saints	Brisbane Bears	111
Matthew Robran	Hawthorn Hawks	Adelaide Crows	137
Laurence Schache	Brisbane Bears		29
Justin Staritski	North Melbourne Kangaroos	Collingwood Magpies	26
Greg Whittlesea	Hawthorn Hawks		4

=== Hall of Fame Inductees ===
Twelve players, and both coaches, from this game have been inducted into the South Australian Football Hall of Fame. In 2007, Darren Jarman was inducted into the Australian Football Hall of Fame, whilst both coaches also have this honour.

Name	South Australian Football Hall of Fame	Australian Football Hall of Fame
Bruce Abernethy	2007	
John Cahill (Country Coach)	2002	2002
Graham Cornes (City Coach)	2002	2012
Grantley Fielke	2002	
Scott Hodges	2007	
Andrew Jarman	2007	
Darren Jarman	2006	2007
Bruce Lindsay	2004	
John Paynter	2015	
Greg Phillips	2002	
Michael Redden	2002	
Nigel Smart	2008	
Darren Smith	2018	
Stephen Williams	2016	

== See also ==
- 1990 SANFL season
