= Russell Ebert =

Australian rules footballer (1949–2021)

Russell Ebert OAM
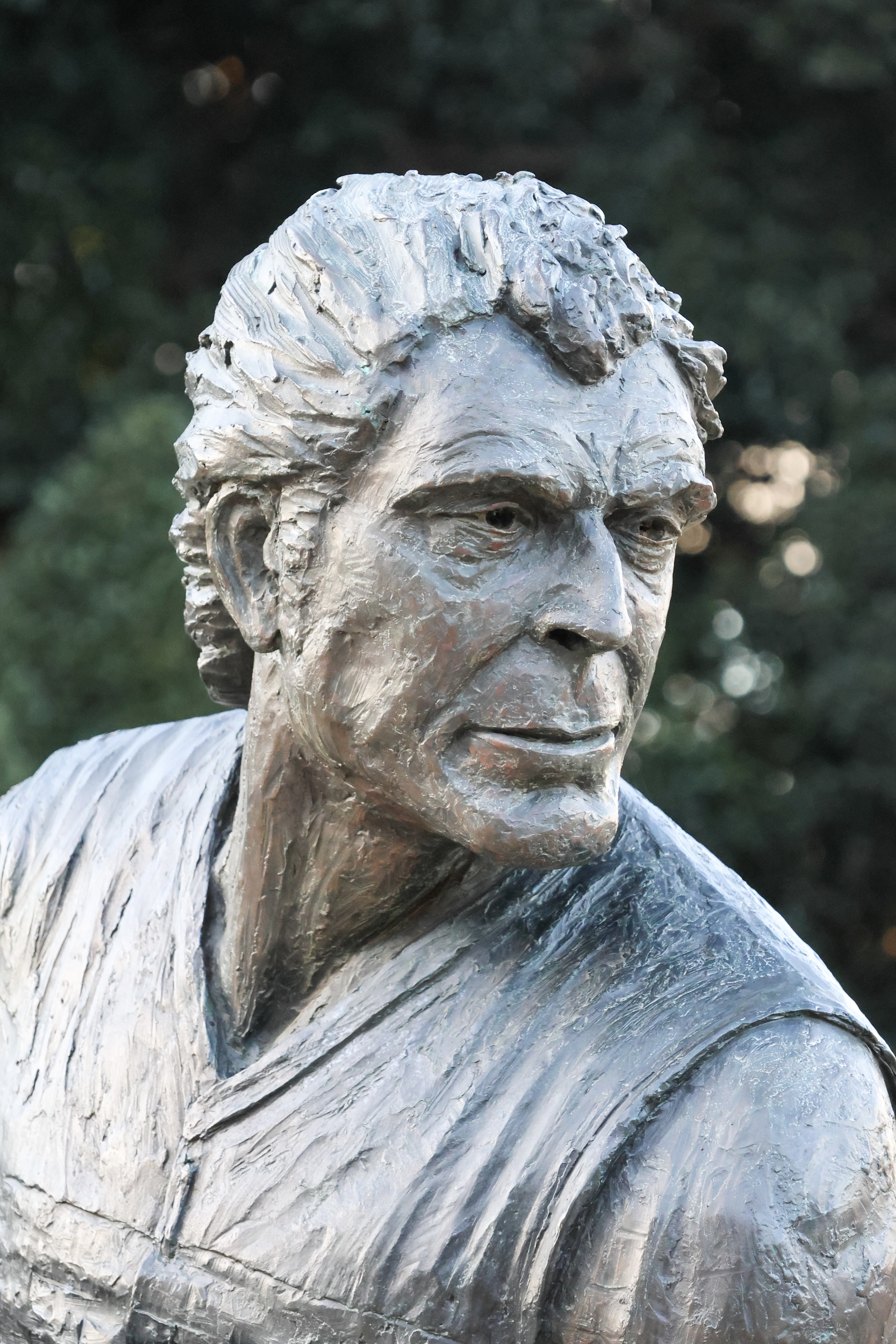
- Russell Ebert statue at Adelaide Oval

Personal information
- Full name: Russell Frank Ebert
- Born: 22 June 1949; Berri, South Australia
- Died: 5 November 2021 (aged 72)
- Original teams: Loxton, Waikerie
- Height: 183 cm (6 ft 0 in)
- Weight: 90 kg (198 lb)
- Position: Midfielder

Playing career^{1}
Years	Club	Games (Goals)
1968–78, 80–85	Port Adelaide	367 (286)
1979	North Melbourne	25 (15)
Total		392 (301)

Representative team honours
Years	Team	Games (Goals)
1970–83	South Australia	29
1996–98	South Australia (Coach)	3

Coaching career^{3}
Years	Club	Games (W–L–D)
1983–87	Port Adelaide	116 (64–52–0)
1988–90	Woodville	64 (24–40–0)
- ^{1} Playing statistics correct to the end of 1985.^{3} Coaching statistics correct as of 1990.

Career highlights
- Club: 3× Port Adelaide premiership player (1977, 1980, 1981); 4× Magarey Medal (1971, 1974, 1976, 1980); Jack Oatey Medal (1981); 6× Port Adelaide best & fairest (1971, 1972, 1974, 1976, 1977, 1981); Port Adelaide captain (1974–1978, 1983–1985); Port Adelaide leading goalkicker (1968); Port Adelaide 'All-Time' games record holder (392); Port Adelaide best first year player (1968); Representative: 3× South Australian captain (1975, 1977, 1983); 29 games for South Australia; South Australian coach 1996, 1997, 1998; Honours: Port Adelaide's greatest team (centre); Australian Football Hall of Fame, inducted 1996, Legend status 2022; South Australian Football Hall of Fame (2002); SANFL life member; Port Adelaide life member (1977)

Russell Frank Ebert OAM (22 June 1949 – 5 November 2021) was an Australian rules footballer and coach. He is considered one of the greatest players in the history of Australian rules football. Ebert is the only player to have won four Magarey Medals, which are awarded to the best and fairest player in the South Australian National Football League (SANFL). He is one of four Australian rules footballers to have a statue at Adelaide Oval, the others being Ken Farmer, Malcolm Blight and Barrie Robran. Football historian John Devaney described Ebert as coming "as close as any player in history to exhibiting complete mastery over all the essential skills of the game," and he is widely regarded as the Port Adelaide Football Club's greatest-ever player.

Aside from his 367 premiership games at Port Adelaide, Ebert also played 25 games for North Melbourne in the 1979 VFL season and collected over 500 possessions as a midfielder for the club, which reached the preliminary final. Ebert was an inaugural inductee into the Australian Football Hall of Fame in 1996, and he was posthumously elevated to Legend status in June 2022, the highest honour that can be bestowed onto an Australian footballer.

== Early life ==
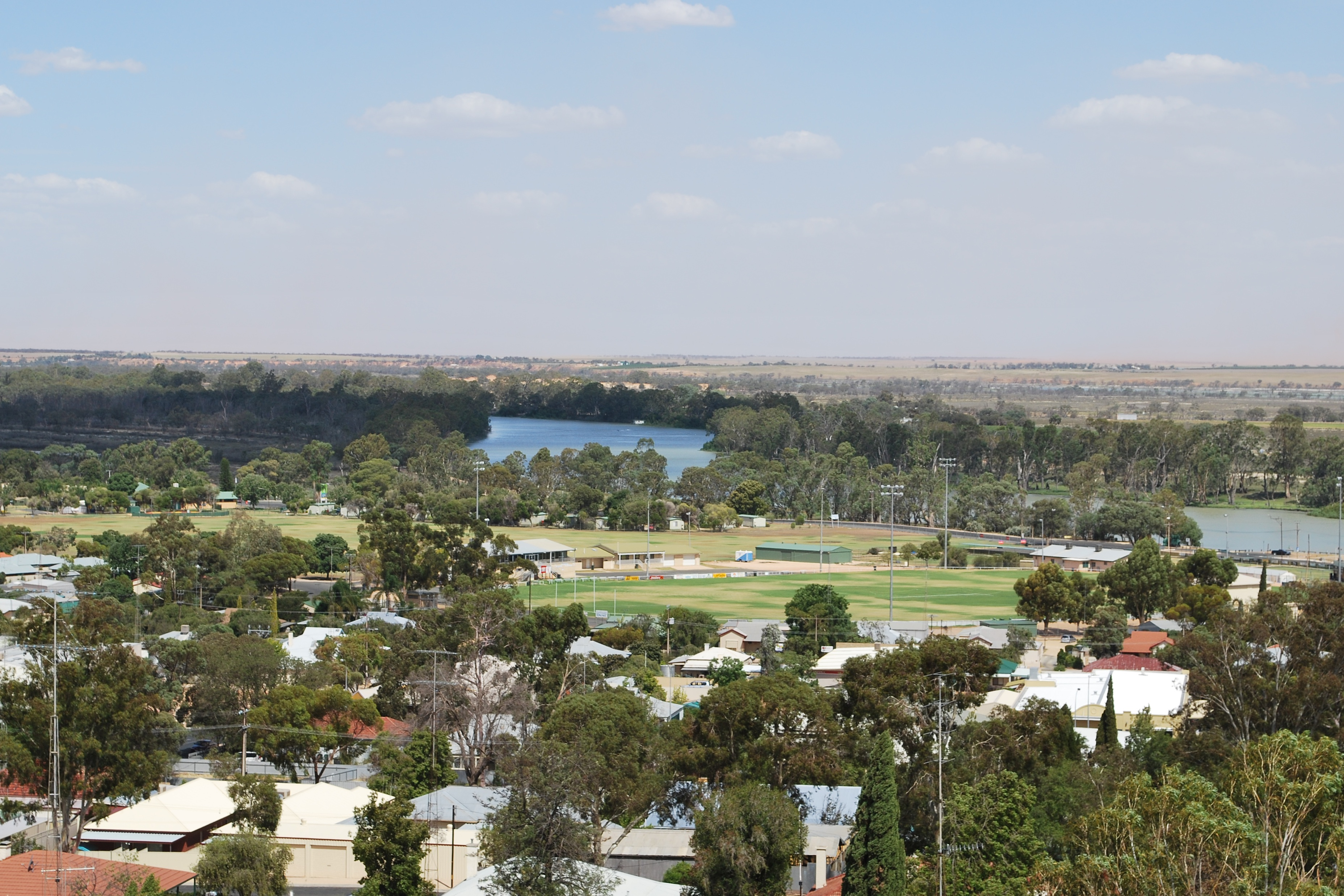
Ebert was born in Berri, South Australia, a town on the River Murray.

The fourth of six children of Doreen and Albert Ebert, Russell was born in the South Australian river town of Berri. Russell's father Albert was a footballer with the Alawoona Football Club and captain coached the team to a premiership in 1953. At eight years old Ebert was in the crowd when Port Adelaide defeated Norwood in the 1957 SANFL Grand Final.

Russell's family moved to Loxton during his high-school years and the town was home to his junior football club, the Loxton Football Club, where he played with his brothers.

As a teenager, Ebert gained employment with the Bank of Loxton. He was subsequently transferred to the Savings Bank at Waikerie. Ebert joined the Waikerie Football Club and played alongside Bruce Light, who eventually played for Port Adelaide with him.

== Football career ==
Before Ebert agreed to join Port Adelaide, six other SANFL clubs (North Adelaide, Central District, Woodville, Norwood, Glenelg and South Adelaide) approached Ebert about joining their clubs. In an interview with John Wood about this period in time, Ebert said he was set on joining North Adelaide but their representative "never came back".

=== Port Adelaide (1968–1978) ===
Fos Williams (pictured) was Ebert's first league coach. Williams said that Ebert "was the most skilful of the Port Adelaide players who came under my control".

In 1968, Eric Freeman, Port Adelaide's full-forward, was selected to play for the Australian cricket team for the upcoming Ashes series. The absence of Freeman provided Ebert the opportunity, as an 18-year-old, to claim the full-forward position in the team. Ebert made his debut in the first round of the 1968 SANFL season against Glenelg on Alberton Oval. Ebert remained in Waikerie during 1968, driving back and forth between the Riverland and Adelaide for training and match day. During that season, Ebert kicked six goals in a game against both North Adelaide and Sturt. He played all but one senior game for Port Adelaide in his first season. In his first season of league football, Ebert benefited from experienced Port Adelaide premiership players such as John Cahill, Trevor Obst, Peter Obst, Ronald Elleway and Eric Freeman after his return from playing test cricket in England. In Ebert's first season with Port Adelaide the club qualified for the 1968 SANFL Grand Final against Sturt, reigning premiers for the past two seasons. Sturt won the match by 27 points. At the end of year Ebert was the recipient of Port Adelaide's leading goal-kicker award in his debut season after kicking 44 goals. He was also awarded the club's best first year player award.

In 1969, Ebert moved from the forward line to the centre and consolidated the position as his own in the Port Adelaide line up. It was during the 1969 SANFL season that members of Port Adelaide's golden era were retiring from football en masse, resulting in Fos Williams providing league debuts to 15 first-year players. As a result of this influx of junior players the club finished sixth, winning 9 of 20 games.

In 1970, Ebert was selected for the South Australian state football team for the first time. Port Adelaide finished the 1970 SANFL season as minor premiers for the first time since the club won the 1965 SANFL Grand Final. They would lose both finals to eventual 1970 SANFL Grand Finalists Glenelg and Sturt, the latter recording their fifth straight premiership. At the end of the season, Port Adelaide recognised Ebert as the club's best player during their finals series.

During the 1971 pre-season, Port Adelaide defeated South Melbourne in a trial match in Victoria. On 26 June 1971 the publication Inside Football reported that Carlton had approached Port Adelaide with the intention of freeing Ebert from his contract to play for them in the VFL. Ebert confirmed that he returned to Melbourne, after South Australia played Victoria in that state earlier in the year, to meet Carlton officials but that nothing came of it, saying, "I haven't heard from Carlton since I went over after the State game. It was during this year that Ebert won his first Magarey Medal, awarded to the fairest and most brilliant player in the SANFL, receiving 21 votes from the league umpires, one more vote than runner up Peter Marker and Phil Haughan, who both received 20 votes each. In 1971 Ebert was also awarded his first Port Adelaide best and fairest. Port Adelaide reached the 1971 SANFL Grand Final but lost to minor premiers North Adelaide by 20 points.

In 1972, Port Adelaide again reached the SANFL Grand Final and again lost to North Adelaide, this time by 56 points. North Adelaide went on to win the 1972 Championship of Australia defeating Carlton. At the end of the season Ebert was awarded his second club best and fairest.

For the 1973 SANFL season, Port Adelaide finished the minor round fourth. On 8 September 1973, the club faced fifth place Norwood, at Norwood Oval, in the Elimination Final. Norwood won the match by 36 points in what was Fos Williams's last outing as coach of Port Adelaide. Twenty-six years later Fos Williams said that Ebert was the best player he had seen play for Port Adelaide and that "it was my privilege to coach him". At the conclusion of the 1973 SANFL season, Alan Schwab from Richmond and Ron Joseph from North Melbourne both made approaches to Ebert offering him contracts to play for their respective clubs in the VFL. Footscray and Melbourne also made approaches regarding acquiring Ebert around this time.

==== Port Adelaide captain (1974–1978) ====
For the 1974 SANFL season, John Cahill took over as Port Adelaide coach from Fos Williams, and one of his first actions was to appoint Ebert as club captain. During the 1974 pre-season Port Adelaide defeated South Melbourne on Alberton Oval by 10 points. During the season at a Port Adelaide fundraiser at Alberton Oval titled 'Build Local Players', Australian Prime Minister Gough Whitlam was present and congratulated Ebert on his season to that point. Ebert won the 1974 Magarey Medal, his second, in front of runner-up Rick Davies of Sturt. Port Adelaide lost the 1974 SANFL Preliminary Final to Glenelg by 49 points with Ebert's summation published in the Sunday Mail being "Disappointed...what else can I say?".

In 1975, Ebert captained the South Australian state team for the first time. Port Adelaide finished the minor round of the 1975 SANFL season in fourth place. Ebert was best on ground in Port Adelaide's 30-point win over North Adelaide in the First Elimination Final, collecting 42 disposals and 1 goal. The following week Port Adelaide comfortably beat reigning premiers Sturt by 67 points in the First Semi Final. Port Adelaide lost the Preliminary Final to Norwood by 30 points despite leading at the end of the third quarter by 6 points.

Port Adelaide finished the 1976 SANFL season as minor premiers, two and a half wins ahead of second placed Sturt. Ebert was selected as captain and centre in The News '1976 Team of the Year'. That year Ebert won his third Magarey Medal by a record margin of 17 votes over runner-up Barry Norsworthy of Central District. With 42 votes he became the sixth SANFL player to become a triple Magarey medallist. In the lead up to the 1976 Magarey Medal, Ebert noted that he would rather win the premiership than have another Magarey Medal. In an interview with Alan Shiell, Ebert stated that "It's a big thrill to win the medal but its still an individual award". Port Adelaide qualified for the 1976 SANFL Grand Final after defeating Glenelg by 43 points in the Second Semi Final. That years SANFL Grand Final sold a state record 66,987 tickets. When the SANFL ran out of tickets they opened Football Park's gates for free and the crowd grew by an estimated 15,000. The gates were shut by police 90 minutes before the bounce as spectators were being crushed. Subsequently, the police allowed thousands of spectators onto the field to sit along the fence to prevent any further physical injuries. In Ebert's fourth attempt at winning an SANFL Grand Final, he and his club were unsuccessful, with Sturt defeating Port Adelaide by 41 points. During an interview with Mike Sheehan on Open Mike regarding the loss of the 1976 SANFL Grand Final, in the context of Port Adelaide having now lost its last four Grand Finals, Ebert noted that he started to question "whether I was to blame" for the club's failure to win a premiership.

After two seasons where Port Adelaide was forced to play games away from Alberton Oval, the club returned to playing SANFL games at its traditional venue in front of record crowds, including an attendance of 22,738 against Norwood on 11 June 1977. Ebert won his first premiership as a player as Port Adelaide broke its 12-year drought, defeating Glenelg at Football Park in the 1977 SANFL Grand Final. Before the presentation of the Thomas Seymour Hill Trophy, thousands of spectators stormed the ground. When Ebert recalled this moment he noted that "[i]t was quite dangerous to have close to ten thousand people just stampede onto the oval into a really confined space. We just looked for our teammates and got into the huddle...Everyone just wanted to get out there and be a part of it". Ebert kept only one guernsey from his playing career, the one he wore in the 1977 premiership decider. Ebert was awarded SANFL life membership during the 1977 SANFL season.

'It has taken us a bloody long time but by gee it was worth it!'

— Russell Ebert during the post game award presentations of the 1977 SANFL Grand Final.

Following the success of Port Adelaide's 1977 premiership, the club, led by Ebert, finished fourth during the minor round of the 1978 SANFL season, qualifying for finals. Ebert finished runner up by one vote in the 1978 Magarey Medal count to Kym Hodgeman of Glenelg. Port Adelaide comfortably beat West Torrens in the Elimination Final. The club then faced Glenelg, 1977 runners-up, in the First Semi Final. Glenelg were in control of the game for the first three quarters but a "gutsy" effort by Ebert in the midfield helped Port Adelaide win the match and qualify for the Preliminary Final against Norwood.

=== North Melbourne (1979) ===
On 22 January 1979 Ebert spoke to Bob McLean, Port Adelaide's general manager, informing him of his intention to play with North Melbourne for the 1979 VFL season. In response McLean tabled to Ebert the largest contract offer in the history of the Port Adelaide Football Club but Ebert declined. Many Victorian Football League clubs had chased Ebert for a decade until North Melbourne finally won his signature. Port Adelaide agreed to lease Ebert to North Melbourne for the 1979 season in exchange for Mark Dawson, as well as paying Ebert $35,000. In response to Ebert moving from the SANFL to the VFL, the former league's president Max Basheer lamented that "[f]rom a state and club viewpoint we cannot afford to lose players of this calibre". During 1979 Ebert continued to operate his business, a sports store, in Adelaide. Ebert would fly to Melbourne for the Tuesday training session, fly back to Adelaide, work until the middle of Thursday, fly to Melbourne again, play for North Melbourne in the VFL, and fly back Saturday night. North Melbourne agreed to cover Ebert's large travel costs.

1979 Russell Ebert Travel Schedule
Tuesday afternoon	Flight to Melbourne
Tuesday night	Flight to Adelaide
Thursday afternoon	Flight to Melbourne
Saturday night	Flight to Adelaide

'I think he was the first fly-in fly-out footballer because he came across from South Australia, Port Adelaide, and played just the one season. He flew in on a Thursday night and would fly home on a Sunday. Marvellous year at the club, played all 25 games, 15 goals, had the most possessions of anyone at the club in that time.'

— Ross Glendinning describing Ebert's year at North Melbourne in 1979.

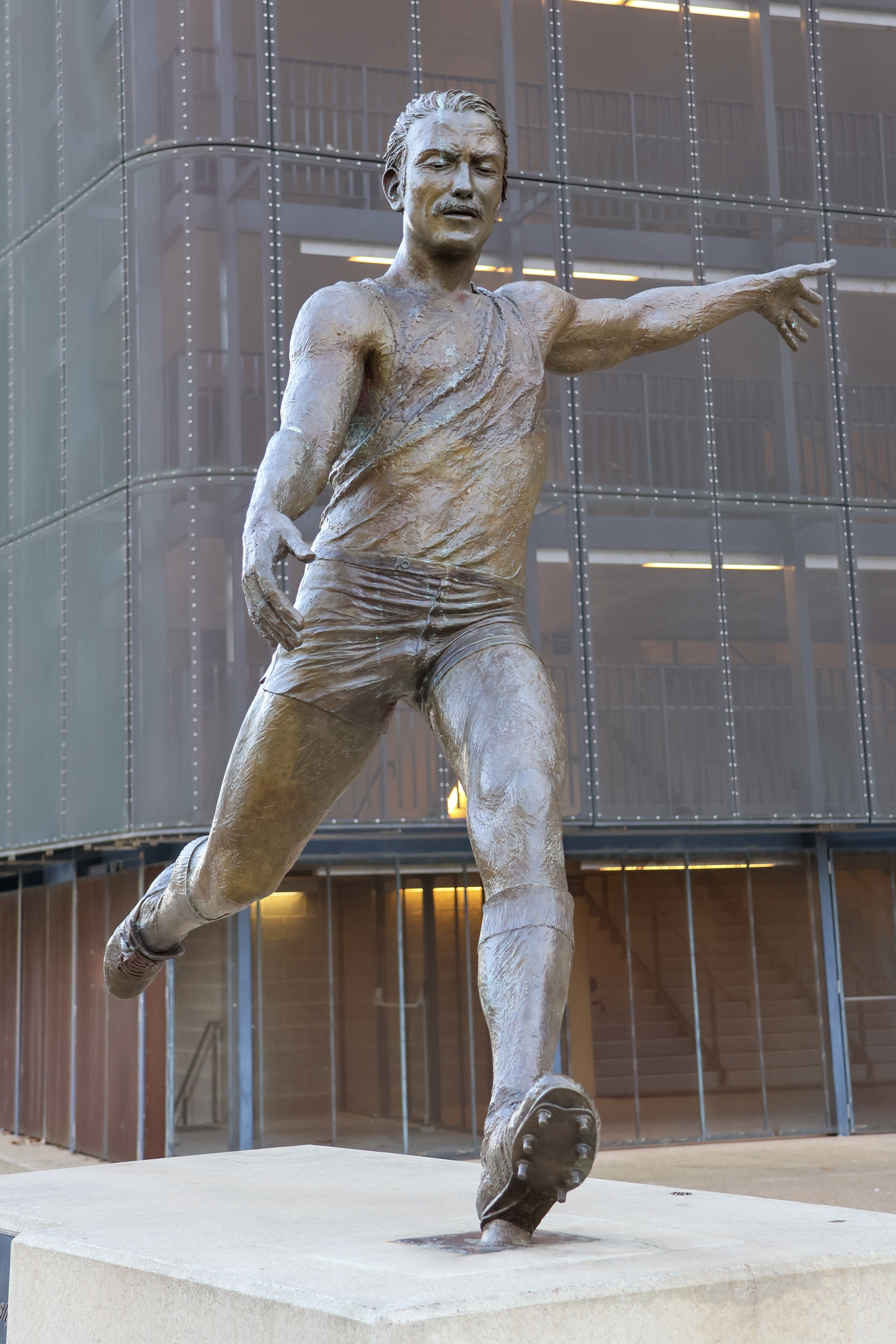
Ebert joined fellow South Australian Malcolm Blight at North Melbourne for the 1979 VFL season.

According to Malcolm Blight, when North Melbourne suffered a series of injuries during 1979, Ron Barassi utilised Ebert in a range of different positions. Ebert's tally of twenty-five games for North Melbourne is the VFL/AFL record for the most games in a career in that league that only lasted one season. During his season with North Melbourne Ebert would play alongside Malcolm Blight, Graham Cornes, Keith Greig, Ross Glendinning, Wayne Schimmelbusch, Gary Dempsey and Graham Melrose. Ebert collected the most disposals of any North Melbourne player during 1979. North Melbourne finished second on the ladder and reached the Preliminary Final.

'Russell was a pleasure to coach. His input both physically and mentally was excellent. He never whinged or moaned about sore spots and trained and played with them which is what a coach admires. Russell thought about his footy and gave it all he had.'

— Ron Barassi, coach of Ebert during the 1979 VFL season.

After a challenging year balancing his business, family and football commitments Ebert did not consider playing another season with North Melbourne in 1980. Despite this, when Ebert was asked if he was glad he played for North Melbourne he unequivocally answered affirmatively saying "Absolutely...It was one of the most demanding, one of the most exciting and one of the most satisfying years that I can remember."

=== Port Adelaide return (1980–1987) ===
Ebert returned to Port Adelaide as a player for the 1980 SANFL season. From his experiences the previous year playing in the VFL with North Melbourne, Ebert suggested Port Adelaide increase the weight training it required of its players, noting that the Victorian players were more advanced in this facet of the game. During the season Ebert played forward alongside Tim Evans, who that year kicked 144 goals in the SANFL, a record at the time. After a dominant season finishing top of the ladder, Port Adelaide entered the 1980 SANFL Grand Final against Norwood, who finished the minor round fifth, as firm favourites. Norwood provided a strong challenge, leading the match at three quarter time, but Port Adelaide, who lost Tim Evans with an injury during the game, mounted a comeback, winning the premiership decider by 18 points. Ebert also won his record-setting fourth Magarey Medal in 1980, garnering 49 votes from the SANFL's umpires. Runner-up Michael Taylor of Norwood, who was coincidentally sitting on the table next to Ebert at the Magarey Medal gala, was first to congratulate him on winning the fourth medal. During the 1980 SANFL season Ebert broke John Cahill's games played record of 264 senior matches for Port Adelaide. Ebert retired with 392 games for Port Adelaide, a record that has never been beaten. In 2020 Ebert described Port Adelaide's 1980 side as being "as good a side here in South Australia that I had ever played with".

In September 1981, during an interview, Ebert, then aged 32, noted that "When you get to 30 everyone wants you to retire. But I still enjoy competing; I'm happy to compete with any age group". Port Adelaide defeated Glenelg by 51 points in the 1981 SANFL Grand Final. Post-match, Ebert was awarded the inaugural Jack Oatey Medal in recognition of being the best player afield during the game. This was Port Adelaide's third consecutive SANFL premiership, although Ebert missed the 1979 SANFL Grand Final whilst he was with North Melbourne.

On 12 June 1982, an interstate match was held at Football Park between Western Australia and a South Australian side featuring eight Port Adelaide players including Ebert. In that match South Australia defeated Western Australia by 116 points. Port Adelaide finished the 1982 SANFL season as minor premiers. Port Adelaide reached the 1982 SANFL Preliminary Final but its quest for a fourth consecutive premiership was ended in a fiery match against Glenelg, who won the game by 1 point. During this match an infamous incident between David Granger and Graham Cornes occurred, with the former punching the latter. Trevor Gill, in writing his match report for The News, observed that Norwood, Glenelg's opponent in the 1982 SANFL Grand Final, would be beneficiaries of the gruelling encounter against Port Adelaide. The following week Norwood did win the Grand Final, defeating Glenelg by 62 points. On 7 October 1982, Port Adelaide coach John Cahill left the club to accepted the head coaching role at Collingwood. As a result of this Ebert was appointed captain-coach of Port Adelaide on 15 October 1982. Ebert would be one of the last playing coaches in senior Australian rules football.

==== Port Adelaide captain-coach (1983–1985) ====
In his first season as captain-coach of Port Adelaide Ebert would start the 1983 SANFL season without the club's star centre-half back Greg Phillips, who had joined John Cahill at Collingwood. On 16 May 1983 at Football Park, Ebert captained South Australia for the third time, in what was the states first win over Victoria since 1965.

On 23 June 1984 in a game against West Torrens at Football Park, Ebert broke the SANFL record for most games played in that competition, surpassing Paul Bagshaw's tally of 360 games. In 1984, Port Adelaide reached its only Grand Final with Ebert as coach. Port Adelaide's opponent in the 1984 SANFL Grand Final was Norwood who finished the minor round in fifth position. In front of 50,271 spectators, Port Adelaide relinquished a 3-point lead at the final change of the 1984 SANFL Grand Final to eventually lose to Norwood by 9 points. During 1984, Ebert was presented with the Adidas Golden Boot award by Ted Whitten. At the time, Ebert was only the fifth Australian recipient of the award.

Ebert retired as a player at the end of 1985 for Port Adelaide, where his 367 premiership games (392 games including pre-season/night series matches) was a club record until broken by Travis Boak in Round 24 of the 2024 AFL season (premiership matches) or Round 3 of the 2025 AFL season (including pre-season/night season matches).

In 2020, Ebert joked about the longevity of his career, noting that "I guess when you are captain-coach you can pick yourself!".

==== Other matches ====
Ebert played 26 pre-season/night series matches ‐ 25 for Port Adelaide and one for North Melbourne (these are considered senior by the SANFL but not the VFL/AFL) - and 29 interstate/State of Origin football matches for South Australia. If these are included, Ebert played a total of 447 senior career games.

The VFL/AFL lists Ebert's total as 446, excluding his pre-season/night series match for North Melbourne.

Regardless of the differing viewpoints, Ebert's total was the all-time record in elite Australian rules football at the time of his retirement, and Australian Prime Minister Bob Hawke wrote Ebert a letter congratulating him on his achievement.

Ebert held the record until it was broken by Peter Carey in either Round 6 or Round 7 of 1988; Carey retired at the end of that season with a total of 467 senior career games. As of 2025, Ebert's senior games tally is eighth in elite Australian rules football, and second in South Australian elite football.

Ebert played in the inaugural E. J. Whitten Legends Game in 1996.

==== Port Adelaide non-playing coach (1986–1987) ====
Ebert continued at the club as a non-playing coach for the 1986 SANFL season. However, Ebert began his first season as a non-playing coach without his star wingman and reigning club best and fairest, Craig Bradley, who had been acquired by Carlton. Brad Gotch also returned to Victoria to play for St Kilda. During a training session Port Adelaide's full forward Tim Evans suffered a cracked tibia after stepping on a sprinkler, leading the club's greatest goal-kicker to retire. Port Adelaide in 1986 finished the minor round in third place behind North Adelaide and Glenelg. Greg Anderson won the 1986 Magarey Medal despite being knocked unconscious the week before against Glenelg. In the 1986 SANFL First Semi-Final, Woodville defeated Port Adelaide by 7 points.

The 1987 SANFL season signalled a significant list restructure for Port Adelaide. Ebert debuted eight new juniors to Port Adelaide's league side during the season. Greg Phillips and Bruce Abernethy returned from Collingwood to Port Adelaide to resume playing for the club in 1987. Meanwhile Dwayne Russell and Ben Harris left for VFL clubs Geelong and the Brisbane Bears. Despite overtures from Essendon, Port Adelaide and Ebert managed to hold reigning Magarey Medallist Greg Anderson to the final year of contract for the 1987 SANFL season. Port Adelaide improved on their minor round performance the previous year under Ebert, this time finishing second on the ladder, behind North Adelaide. The club lost both of its 1987 finals against Norwood and Glenelg by 34 points and 2 points, respectively.

After failing to win a final for three consecutive seasons after the 1984 SANFL Grand Final loss, Ebert was sacked as coach of Port Adelaide and was replaced by John Cahill for the 1988 SANFL season. Although the three seasons preceding Ebert's dismissal as coach were ultimately unsuccessful, he is credited with blooding a large number of champions that helped propel the club into the Australian Football League. These players include:

- 1983 – Tim Ginever
- 1984 – Greg Anderson, Darren Smith, Wayne Mahney, Roger Delaney
- 1985 – Mark Tylor, Rohan J. Smith, David Hynes, George Fiacchi, Darryl Borlase
- 1986 – Geoff Phelps
- 1987 – Andrew Obst, Paul Northeast, Scott Hodges, David Brown

=== Woodville coach (1988–1990) ===
At the conclusion of 1987, Woodville coach Malcolm Blight accepted an offer from Geelong to move to Victoria and coach the club for the upcoming 1988 VFL season. Ebert, having recently lost his position as Port Adelaide coach to John Cahill, accepted to fill the equivalent role at Woodville. In his first season as coach of Woodville, the club won the 1988 Escort Cup Final defeating Port Adelaide by 45 points in front of 31,210 at Football Park. The 1988 Escort Cup was the only piece of silverware that the Woodville Football Club ever won.

Woodville merged with West Torrens at the end of the 1990 SANFL season. Ebert was thus the last coach of Woodville as a stand-alone club.

=== South Australia coach (1996–1998) ===
Ebert coached the South Australian state team from 1996 to 1998. The side achieved memorable wins over Western Australia in 1996 and 1998.

=== Playing style ===
Ebert was a strong-bodied player whose physical build and stamina allowed him to dominate football matches. With a high skill level, errors were rare, and his ability to hit teammates with accurate, spearing passes made him very effective in attacking roles. Ebert was able to win his own ball and could quickly handball effectively under pressure.

In 1971, under coach Fos Williams, Williams had a rule that nobody playing in his side could do a drop kick, which requires an extreme level of precision to execute effectively and accurately on a very consistent basis. However, according to teammate Brian Cunningham, after Ebert kicked a couple of goals in a game with a drop kick, Williams acknowledged Ebert's skill and made a special dispensation for him—and him alone.

Gordon Schwartz, football journalist, described Russell Ebert as "a perfect example to the younger generation. On field he maintains expressionless concentration, never indulges in tantrums, and plays with great intensity and energy...Few players of his ability are as industrious. He doesn't believe that his talent entitles him to rest on his laurels and let other people do most of the work."

John Cahill, team-mate and coach of Ebert, described the latter's playing style as being "so strong over the ball - and such power in his legs. He rarely fell over; he was perfectly balanced."

== Media ==
In 1991, Ebert accepted a role working as a commentator at Adelaide radio station FIVEaa. At the station Ebert also worked as a sports talkback panellist. Ebert was a member of the FIVEaa commentary team, along with Ken Cunningham and Chris Dittmar, that called Port Adelaide's win in the 2004 AFL Grand Final.

== Charity work ==
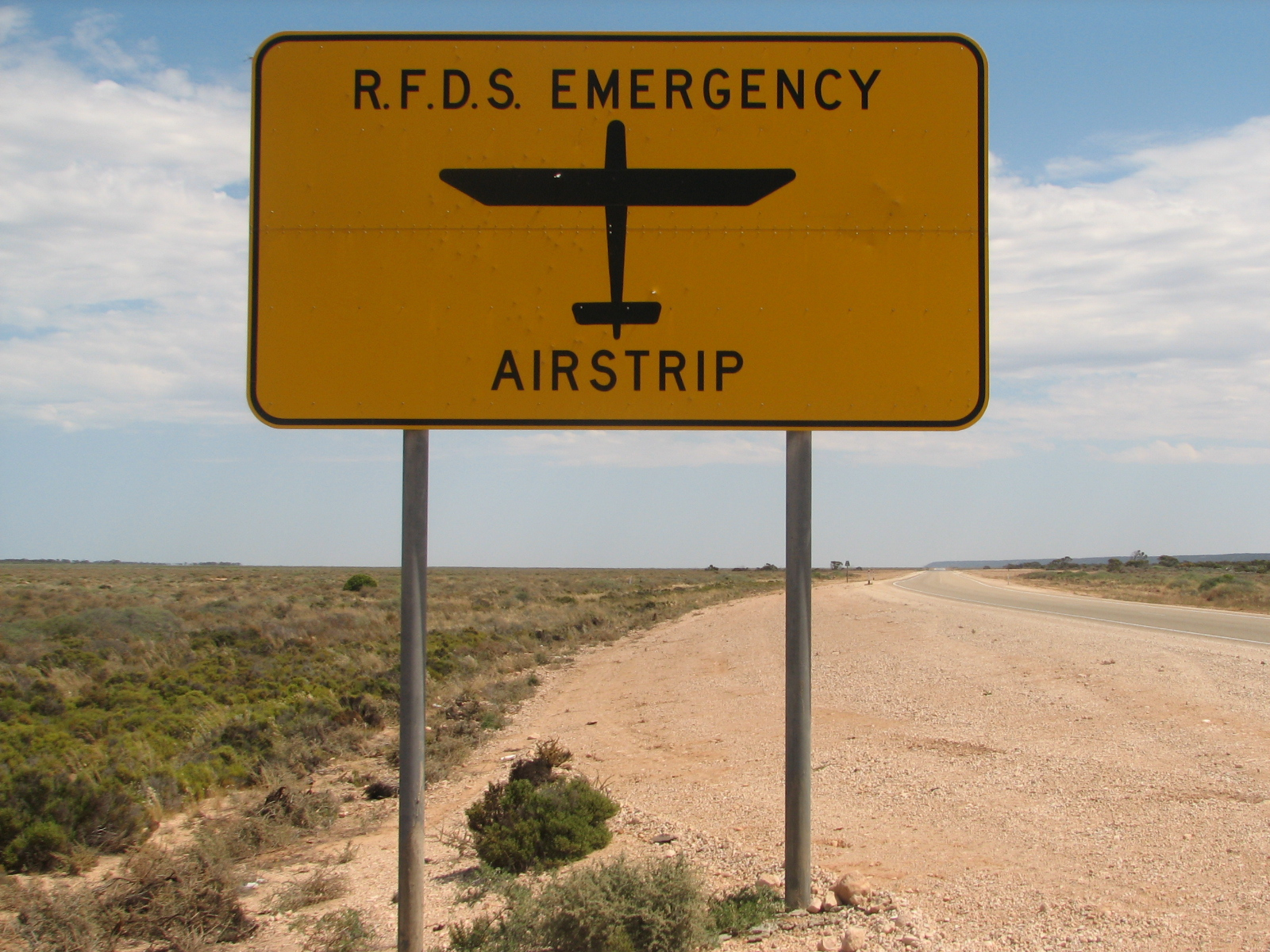
Ebert was involved with the 'Outback Odyssey' for three decades. It was a fundraiser for the Royal Flying Doctor Service (RFDS). Pictured is a sign on the Eyre Highway indicating a RFDS emergency airstrip is ahead.

Ebert used his footballing fame in South Australia to benefit a large array of local charities over many decades. After his death, Warren Tredrea noted that Ebert "was the first to give back using his profile as a champion footballer to help many others through his work with the community programs at the football club and charities away from the club. His legacy goes beyond the game of football". Ebert himself noted that role models in the community are "uniquely poised to positively impact...each time you see that face, each time you hear about the Port Adelaide Football Club you will resonate with the messages that were given on that day.”

In 1980, Ebert became involved with the Crippled Children's Association (CCA) along with Barrie Robran and Peter Marker. They worked together with the charity for 25 years. The CCA was eventually renamed as Novita Children's Services. In 2006 Ebert was a co-founder of the Mighty River Run with John Riddell and Jason Carter. The event is a convoy of boats that travels along the River Murray to raise money for Novita in order to assist people living with disability in South Australia. The 2021 Mighty River Run was conducted in Ebert's honour and raised over $700,000 for Novita.

Ebert was involved with the Outback Odyssey fundraiser for almost three decades. Between 2013 and 2021 the Outback Odyssey raised over $1,000,000 for the Royal Flying Doctor Service.

Ebert was involved in educational programs that sought to prevent domestic violence. In 2015 Ebert welcomed Centacare and the South Australian Department of Education into Alberton Oval to develop a project that sought to educate teenage boys about respectful relationships. The project became known as the 'Power to End Violence against Women' and between 2016 and 2021 over 5,000 students have been involved in the program. Ebert was quoted as saying “It's not only domestic violence ... it is [about] respecting women.”

In 1999, Ebert returned to Port Adelaide to help expand the clubs involvement in community programs. For the following 20 years, before his illness in 2021, Ebert was a key organiser for the club's array of charitable programs. Ebert was involved with the Ice Factor Program that sought to provide team sport to disengaged youth. In 2011 Ebert provided lectures for aged care provider ACH Group outlining strategies on how to stay healthy in later years.

== Personal life ==
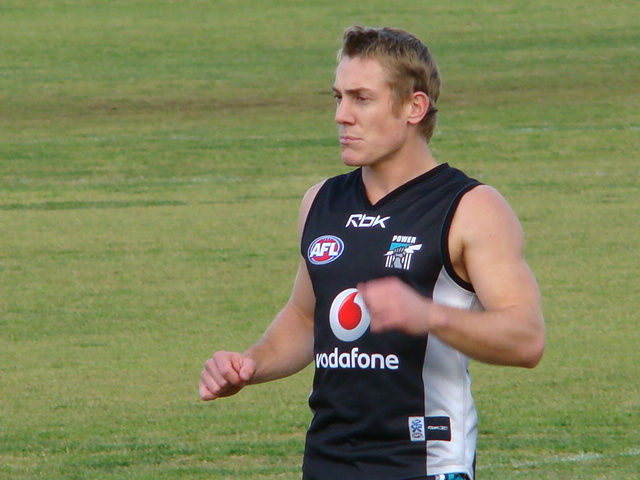
One of Ebert's sons, Brett, also played for Port Adelaide.

Ebert married Dian Lehmann. Ebert and Dian raised three children, Tammie, Ben and Brett. Ebert's brothers Jeff and Craig also played for Port Adelaide in the SANFL making their debuts in 1972 and 1981 respectively. In the 2002 AFL National Draft, Ebert's son Brett was selected under the league's Father-son rule to play for Port Adelaide in the AFL after playing for the same club in the SANFL. Ebert's nephew Brad also both played for Port Adelaide in the SANFL and AFL. Brad Ebert's grandfather was Trevor Obst, and his great-grandfather was Ken Obst; both also played for Port Adelaide.

=== Death ===
In late December 2020, Ebert was diagnosed with acute myeloid leukaemia (AML). Ebert first publicly disclosed his health issues on 26 December 2020 at a Port Adelaide past players reunion. On 5 November 2021, Ebert died at the age of 72 from AML. Later that evening, Steven Marshall, Premier of South Australia, offered his family the option of honouring Ebert with a state funeral. On 9 November 2021, the Ebert family, along with the indented host, the Port Adelaide Football Club, accepted the offer for a state funeral to be held at Alberton Oval. On 16 November 2021, approximately 4,000 people attended Ebert's state funeral.

Gillon McLachlan, chief executive officer of the AFL, issued a statement paying tribute to Ebert, concluding that "The child in me will always admire the great footballer but the adult that I am is in awe of what Russell Ebert was as a man, and his loss after bravely confronting his illness is devastating for his family, for his club, his many fans and for the state of South Australia, where he has given so much. He was everything you would hope to be in a man, and perhaps the best of all of us." At the Glenelg Football Club Centenary Gala, held a few days after Ebert had died, the audience paused to celebrate his career, and the band played the INXS song "Never Tear Us Apart" in his honour. Seven News Adelaide produced a 20-minute tribute to Ebert shortly after his death titled "Remembering Russell".

== Honours ==
In 1984, Ebert was awarded an Order of Australia Medal for his service to Australian football.

Ebert is widely held to be the greatest player to have played for the Port Adelaide Football Club. He was inducted into the Australian Football Hall of Fame in 1996 and is centre for Port Adelaide's greatest team. In June 2022, Ebert was posthumously elevated to Legend status in the Australian Football Hall of Fame, making him the 32nd individual and only the second Port Adelaide player after Haydn Bunton Sr. (who played 17 games for the club after playing the majority of his career at Fitzroy and Subiaco) to be awarded the highest individual honour in the sport.

In 2021, Ebert was recognised with "Legend" status in the South Australian Sport Hall of Fame.

In 2022, Ebert was recognised with "Legend" status in the Australian Football Hall of Fame.

In 2014, the western gate into Alberton Oval was named as the Russell Ebert Gate in honour of Ebert. In 2015, a statute of Ebert, sculpted by Tim Thompson, was unveiled on the eastern concourse of Adelaide Oval. Ebert was the second and currently only one of four Australian rules footballers to have a statue at Adelaide Oval, with the other players being Barrie Robran, Malcolm Blight, and Ken Farmer.

An online poll of Port Adelaide supporters in 2015 saw Ebert, three decades after he had played his last football game, garner 60% of the vote, ahead of next best Gavin Wanganeen, who received 23%. The Adelaide Advertiser, in recognition of Port Adelaide's 150th anniversary in 2020, selected the club's all-time top 150 players, from both the AFL and SANFL, and ranked Ebert at number one.

The SANFL scheduled a "Russell Ebert Tribute Match" for 22 May 2022 on Loxton Oval between Port Adelaide and West Adelaide in honour of Ebert. A curtain raiser to this match is planned to feature Loxton and Waikerie, Ebert's two junior clubs.

== See also ==
- List of Magarey Medallists
- List of Port Adelaide Football Club records
- List of SANFL records
