= 1990 SANFL Grand Final =

1990 Australian rules football final

- Match program cover. Pictured are the club captains Chris McDermott of Glenelg (left) and Russell Johnston of Port Adelaide (right).

Glenelg	Port Adelaide
13.15 (93)	16.12 (108)
	1	2	3	4
GLE	5.2 (32)	6.7 (43)	9.11 (65)	13.15 (93)
PA	4.5 (29)	10.7 (67)	13.9 (87)	16.12 (108)
- Date: 7 October 1990, 2:10pm
- Stadium: Football Park
- Attendance: 50,589
- Umpires: Rick Kinnear, Mark Mackie.
- Coin toss won by: Port Adelaide
- Kicked toward: Southern End

Ceremonies
- Pre-match entertainment: Kate Ceberano
- National anthem: Kate Ceberano

Accolades
- Jack Oatey Medallist: George Fiacchi (Port Adelaide)
- Australian Football Hall of Fame: 1. John Cahill (2002); 2. Graham Cornes (2012); 3. Gavin Wanganeen (2010); 4. Greg Phillips (2020)

Broadcast in Australia
- Network: Channel 9
- Commentators: Kym Dillon, Ian Day, Graham Campbell

The 1990 SANFL Grand Final was an Australian rules football game contested between the Port Adelaide Football Club and the Glenelg Football Club, held at Football Park on Sunday 7 October 1990. It was the 89th annual Grand Final of the South Australian National Football League, staged to determine the premiers of the 1990 SANFL season. The match, attended by 50,589 spectators, was won by Port Adelaide by a margin of 15 points, marking that club's thirtieth premiership victory.

It was the last time that Australian rules football was played in South Australia without the presence of a club in the AFL.

== Background ==
=== Port Adelaide's AFL bid ===
The 1990 SANFL Grand Final was the last time until Port Adelaide's elevation to the AFL in 1997 that the two best South Australian football teams in the state would go head to head. This was due to the Port Adelaide Football Club's application to enter the AFL earlier in the year which eventually failed due to legal challenges. These turn of events met with resistance and outrage from the SANFL and other SANFL teams. The SANFL had officially resisted entering an Adelaide-based team in the AFL for the next three years, but Port Adelaide's attempted entry had forced their hand. Subsequently, the SANFL promptly formed the Adelaide Crows in a board meeting that lasted two hours.

=== Scott Hodges SANFL goal-kicking record ===
Port Adelaide full forward Scott Hodges who won the 1990 Magarey Medal, went into the match 4 goals off the all-time record of 151, set by Sturt's Rick Davies in 1983.

=== Port Adelaide-Glenelg rivalry ===
In 1934 Glenelg won its first flag against Port Adelaide. In the years leading up to the match the two teams had contested the premiership on three occasions, in 1977, 1981 and 1988, with Port Adelaide successful each time.

== Entertainment ==
Kate Ceberano provided the prematch entertainment for the game. She sang "Young Boys Are My Weakness" from her album Brave during the players' warm-ups and also sang the Australian National Anthem before the bounce.

Brave became a major success in the Australian charts, firmly establishing Ceberano as one of Australia's premier artists, and would become the most commercially successful album of her solo career.

== Match summary ==
View of the 1990 SANFL Grand Final at Football Park from the Channel 9 helicopter.

Port Adelaide won the coin toss and chose to kick to the Southern End of Football Park in the first quarter.

=== 1st quarter ===
The game started as a tight arm wrestle with the ball moving from end to end and both sides failing to convert multiple opportunities and set shots. Eleven minutes into the game the scores read Glenelg 0.2 (2) to Port Adelaide 0.5 (5). Eventually Port Adelaide full forward Scott Hodges took a mark in the Magpies goal square and kicked the opening goal of the game. At the following centre bounce Glenelg captain Chris McDermott gave away a free kick that resulted in a quick mark and goal by Wayne Mahney from outside 50. Glenelg won the third centre bounce and Rod Jameson kicked a bouncer along the ground from 30 metres out to register the Tigers first goal of the day. Both sides were unable to obtain control of the ball until Paul Hallahan broke away from a centre contest and kicked a low dart to first year player Matthew Liptak who converted for Glenelg's second goal. Before the next centre bounce a fight broke out at the southern end with the majority of the players on the field involved. The umpires subsequently awarded a free kick to David Marshall and the ball proceed to travel up and down the ground before going out of bounds along the western wing. Darren Smith marked the ball 40 metres from Port Adelaide's goals but due to another fight breaking out he was awarded a 50-metre penalty and kicked a sitter from the top of the goal square. The ball travelled from end to end until a free was awarded against George Fiacchi for a high tackle on John Fidge who converted from 25 metres out. Long kicking was a feature for the remainder of the quarter. Adrian Settre kicked along the ground for Ports next goal. To end the quarter John Fidge started to overpower Ben Harris kicking two goals in succession to help Glenelg enter the break with a three-point lead.

=== 2nd quarter ===
The second quarter began in the same way as the first with defensive pressure restricting opportunities to score. Again it would be Scott Hodges who would kick the first goal of the quarter after a push in the back from 35 metres out. Hodges would kick another goal shortly after from directly in-front.

Late in the second quarter Adrian Settre kicks two goals in two minutes to break the game open. Stephen Williams kicks a goal from 60m out to give Port Adelaide a four-goal lead at half time. Matthew Liptak has a shot for Glenelg after the siren but only manages a behind.

=== 3rd quarter ===
After leaving the field injured during the second quarter Scott Hodges took to the field in his customary full forward position. Scott Salisbury kicked the first goal of the quarter on the run from 45 metres.

=== 4th quarter ===
At the 6-minute mark of the final quarter Scott Hodges takes a mark at centre half forward and kicks his 5th goal for the match and his 153rd goal for the season to set the SANFL's goal-kicking record.

== Teams ==
Port Adelaide were captained by Russell Johnston and coached by John Cahill. Glenelg was captained by Chris McDermott and coached by Graham Cornes.

Glenelg
B:	2 Ross Gibbs	17 Chris Duthy	14 Allan Bartlett
HB:	41 Robbie Thompson	31 John Seebohm	35 Rod Jameson
C:	9 Tony Symonds	16 David Marshall	19 Lynden Bow
HF:	36 Scott Salisbury	20 Michael Murphy	1 Darren Mansell
F:	26 Gary Christie	8 John Fidge	34 Paul Hallahan
Foll:	4 Chris Melican	10 Chris McDermott (c)	21 Nick Chigwidden
Int:	12 Brett Deane	27 Matthew Liptak	
Coach:	Graham Cornes		

Port Adelaide
B:	4 George Fiacchi	29 Ben Harris	17 Paul Rizonico
HB:	5 Bruce Abernethy	20 Greg Phillips	32 Paul Northeast
C:	27 David Hutton	10 Stephen Williams	12 Simon Tregenza
HF:	26 Richard Foster	28 Darren Smith	14 Wayne Mahney
F:	15 David Hynes	11 Scott Hodges	3 Gavin Wanganeen
Foll:	1 Russell Johnston (c)	9 Mark Williams	2 Tim Ginever
Int:	19 Adrian Settre	25 Geoff Phelps	
Coach:	John Cahill		

== Scorecard ==
1990 SANFL Grand Final
Saturday, 7 October (2:10 pm)	Glenelg	def. by	Port Adelaide	Football Park (crowd: 50,589)
5.2 (32); 6.7 (43); 9.11 (65); 13.15 (93)	Q1; Q2; Q3; Final	4.5 (29); 10.7 (67); 13.9 (87); 16.12 (108)	Umpires: Rick Kinnear and Mark Mackie; Jack Oatey Medallist: George Fiacchi; Television broadcast: Nine Network
Fidge — 5 Murphy — 3 Christie, Liptak, Jameson, Marshall, Salisbury — 1	Goals	6 — Hodges; 3 — Settre; 2 — Smith, Wanganeen; 1 — Mahney, S. Williams, M. Williams
Symonds, Jameson, Murphy	Best	Hutton, Ginever, Fiacchi, Hodges
Injuries	Johnston, Hodges (knee), Ginever (concussion), Mahney (hamstring)

== Postmatch ==
The game was John Cahill's 7th premiership and the last SANFL Premiership awarded before the advent of the Adelaide Crows.

"That was a great effort. There was a lot of pressure on us with injuries before and during the game. We had some bad injuries during the game, which worried us because we were down to 16 fit men at half-time. Apart from the injuries to Johnston and Hodges, Ginever had concussion and Mahney had a bad hamstring. But they showed tremendous fighting qualities and that's what Port Adelaide is all about - the commitment of the players, courage and desperation. I thought they gave everything they could. Some of them were just running on memory at the finish. Hynes did a great job in ruck. He responds to responsibility and he just had it put on to him that he had to do it and I give him full credit. He paced himself for the full game and he did it well. At half time I thought Hodges was down and out but he's got a lot of courage and he just put a bandage on it (the knee) and went back on."

— John Cahill, Port Adelaide coach.

The bitterness against Port Adelaide for their AFL entry bid was summed up by Glenelg coach Graham Cornes in his post-match speech to the Port players when after congratulating them on their efforts criticised the club for ending the good days of football in the state. Cornes was then hastily ushered out amongst jeers and singing from Port players and officials. Ironically, Cornes left Glenelg to coach the Crows in 1991.

"I want to tell you that you want to enjoy this moment for what it is because the good times are well and truly gone. Apart from Jack (John Cahill) and the players there are a couple of individuals out there who are responsible for that and make sure you enjoy tonight because the good times will not happen again."

— Graham Cornes address to the Port Adelaide changers post match.

The entry of an Adelaide-based team significantly weakened the SANFL competition by taking the best players from each club. From Port Adelaide, the Crows took Hodges, Darren Smith, Tregenza, Abernethy, and David Brown, while Wanganeen joined Essendon, Hynes joined West Coast, and Rohan Smith joined St Kilda. From Glenelg, the Crows took Murphy, Marshall, Jameson, McDermott, Liptak, Thompson, Bartlett and coach Cornes.

"These twenty blokes, everyone whose helped us, are sensational people and all the views that you have read in the press the one thing that really matters is that there will always be a Port Adelaide Football Club."

— George Fiacchi upon accepting the 1990 Jack Oatey Medal for best on ground at the 1990 SANFL Grand Final.

While SANFL clubs had been losing star players to AFL teams for several years, the entry of the Adelaide Crows, seen then as virtually a state team, made it more acceptable and even expected for the top SANFL players to join other AFL clubs also.

When Port Adelaide finally entered a team in the AFL in 1997, John Cahill was the inaugural coach with Mark Williams as Assistant Coach and Gavin Wanganeen was captain. David Brown and Scott Hodges were also members of the initial playing squad.

== See also ==
- Showdown (AFL)
- 1934 SANFL Grand Final
- 1977 SANFL Grand Final
- 1981 SANFL Grand Final
- 1988 SANFL Grand Final
- 1992 SANFL Grand Final
