= 1992 SANFL Grand Final =

1992 Australian rules football final

Port Adelaide	Glenelg
17.3 (105)	7.7 (49)
	1	2	3	4
PA	1.2 (8)	8.3 (51)	15.3 (93)	17.3 (105)
GLE	3.3 (21)	4.6 (30)	6.7 (43)	7.7 (49)
- Date: Saturday 3 October 1992
- Stadium: Football Park
- Attendance: 42,242
- Umpires: Michael Abbott and Kevin Chambers
- Coin toss won by: Glenelg
- Kicked toward: South End

Ceremonies
- Pre-match entertainment: Up for Grabs and James Morrison
- National anthem: James Morrison

Broadcast in Australia
- Network: Channel 9
- Commentators: Ian Day; Kym Dillon; Neville Roberts; Rick Davies (special comments); Graham Campbell (boundary)

The 1992 South Australian National Football League (SANFL) Grand Final saw the Port Adelaide Magpies defeat the Glenelg Tigers by 56 points. The match was played on Saturday 3 October 1992 at Football Park in wet weather in front of a crowd of 42,242.

This was Port Adelaide's 31st SANFL Premiership. In the 24-year period of 1969–1992, Glenelg had appeared in 14 Grand Finals for only 3 Premiership victories (all over North Adelaide). Of the 11 Grand Final defeats, 5 were at the hands of Port Adelaide.

== Teams ==
Port Adelaide was captained by Greg Phillips and coached by John Cahill. Glenelg was captained by Scott Salisbury and coached by Kym Hodgeman.

Port Adelaide
B:	4 George Fiacchi	7 Roger Delaney	17 Paul Rizonico
HB:	26 Richard Foster	1 Greg Phillips (c)	32 Paul Northeast
C:	27 David Hutton	34 Nathan Buckley	13 Rohan Smith
HF:	16 Darryl Borlase	28 Darren Smith	10 Stephen Williams
F:	5 Bruce Abernethy	11 Scott Hodges	21 David Brown
Foll:	8 Brett Chalmers	9 Mark Williams	2 Tim Ginever (vc)
Int:	25 Danny Hughes	19 Adrian Settre	
Coach:	John Cahill		

Glenelg
B:	Chris Duthy	Paul Rouvray	Robbie Thompson
HB:	Mark Viska	John Seebohm	Andrew McKay
C:	Lynden Bow	David Marshall	Rod Jameson
HF:	Clayton Lamb	Michael Murphy	Nick Chigwidden
F:	Dwaine Kretschmer	John Fidge	Grant Reubenicht
Foll:	Gary Christie	Darren Mansell	Paul Hallahan
Int:	Scott Salisbury (c)	Allan Bartlett	
Coach:	Kym Hodgeman		

For Port Adelaide, Nathan Buckley had 26 disposals (22 kicks, 4 handballs), followed by Bruce Abernethy and Rohan Smith with 25. Roger Delaney took 7 marks.

For Glenelg, Darren Mansell had 33 disposals (24 kicks, 9 handballs) and took 9 marks. Grant Reubenicht and Paul Hallahan had 23 disposals. Reubenicht also took 9 marks.

== Goal Kickers ==
Port: S. Hodges 6.0, D. Smith 3.0, N. Buckley 2.2, A. Settre 1.0, R. Foster 1.0, B. Chalmers 1.0, D. Borlase 1.0, D. Brown 1.0, T. Ginever 1.0, S. Williams 0.1

Glenelg: J. Fidge 4.3, C. Lamb 1.2, D. Mansell 1.1, S. Salisbury 1.0, J. Seebohm 0.1

John Fidge's 4 goals took his season total to 84 goals, second on the SANFL goalkickers list for the 1992 season.

Port Adelaide player Mark Tylor had played at full forward for most of the season and was leading the SANFL goalkicking with 97 goals. Tylor broke his hand toward the end of the season, causing him to miss the finals. This not only denied Tylor the opportunity to play in the premiership, but also the chance to kick 100 goals for the season.

Richard Foster and Brett Chalmers both kicked goals just before half time, the latter from 70m. At half time it started to hail.

== Umpires ==
The game was umpired by Michael Abbott and Kevin Chambers.

== Jack Oatey Medal ==
The Jack Oatey Medal for best player in the Grand Final was awarded to Nathan Buckley of Port Adelaide. Buckley also won the Magarey Medal in 1992, and joined the Brisbane Bears in the Australian Football League (AFL) in 1993.
