= 1990 SANFL season =

- Teams: 10
- Premiers: Port Adelaide; 30th premiership
- Minor premiers: Port Adelaide; 41st minor premiership
- Magarey Medallist: Scott Hodges; Port Adelaide (16 votes)
- Ken Farmer Medallist: Scott Hodges; Port Adelaide (153 goals)

Attendance
- Matches played: 106
- Total attendance: 807,182 (7,615 per match)
- Highest: 50,589 (Grand Final, Port Adelaide vs. Glenelg)

The 1990 South Australian National Football League season was the 111th season of the top-level Australian rules football competition in South Australia. The season opened on Saturday 14 April with all of the opening round matches simultaneously, and concluded on Sunday 7 October with the Grand Final in which Port Adelaide (minor premiers) won its 30th premiership by defeating Glenelg (second at the end of the minor rounds).

North Adelaide, Norwood and South Adelaide also made the top (final) five teams and participated in the finals matches. West Adelaide, Central District, Woodville, West Torrens and Sturt all missed the top five, with the latter finishing last to win its 12th wooden spoon.

This was the last SANFL season with Woodville and West Torrens as they would merge to form Woodville-West Torrens, and also the last SANFL season before the introduction of Adelaide into the Australian Football League. This effectively relegating the SANFL to second tier status in South Australia.

== 1990 Foundation Cup ==
=== Grand Final ===
	Round 1
Saturday, 7 April (7:10 pm)	Glenelg 17.14 (116)	def.	Woodville 11.3 (69)	Football Park	[Report]

- This was the third time Woodville reached a Grand Final of any kind during its existence as a stand-alone club.

== 1990 SANFL minor rounds ==
=== Round 1 ===
	Round 1
Saturday, 14 April (2:10 pm)	Glenelg 16.8 (104)	def.	West Torrens 9.10 (64)	Football Park (crowd: 7,167)	[Report]
Saturday, 14 April (2:10 pm)	Sturt 16.12 (108)	def. by	West Adelaide 16.13 (109)	Adelaide Oval (crowd: 5,912)	[Report]
Saturday, 14 April (2:10 pm)	Central District 11.10 (76)	def. by	Port Adelaide 26.12 (168)	Elizabeth Oval (crowd: 10,229)	[Report]
Saturday, 14 April (2:10 pm)	Norwood 11.6 (72)	def. by	North Adelaide 16.8 (104)	Norwood Oval (crowd: 12,871)	[Report]
Saturday, 14 April (2:10 pm)	Woodville 17.12 (114)	def.	South Adelaide 13.12 (90)	Woodville Oval (crowd: 2,816)	[Report]

=== Round 2 ===
	Round 2
Saturday, 21 April (2:10 pm)	South Adelaide 11.16 (82)	def. by	West Adelaide 14.14 (98)	Football Park (crowd: 3,522)	[Report]
Sunday, 22 April (2:10 pm)	West Torrens 15.12 (102)	def.	Woodville 9.11 (65)	Football Park (crowd: 5,176)	[Report]
Monday, 23 April (2:10 pm)	Central District 15.13 (103)	def.	North Adelaide 10.8 (68)	Football Park (crowd: 3,237)	[Report]
Wednesday, 25 April (2:10 pm)	Port Adelaide 18.19 (127)	def.	Norwood 12.9 (81)	Football Park (crowd: 36,397)	[Report]
Wednesday, 25 April (2:10 pm)	Glenelg 21.10 (136)	def.	Sturt 10.11 (71)	Adelaide Oval (crowd: 12,147)	[Report]

=== Round 3 ===
	Round 3
Saturday, 28 April (2:10 pm)	Woodville 13.13 (91)	def.	Central District 13.9 (87)	Football Park	[Report]
Saturday, 28 April (2:10 pm)	North Adelaide 12.9 (81)	def. by	West Torrens 13.15 (93)	Prospect Oval	[Report]
Sunday, 29 April (2:10 pm)	South Adelaide 16.12 (108)	def.	Sturt 10.15 (75)	Adelaide Oval	[Report]
Sunday, 29 April (2:10 pm)	West Adelaide 10.16 (76)	def. by	Norwood 23.18 (156)	Richmond Oval	[Report]
Monday, 30 April (2:10 pm)	Glenelg 17.13 (115)	def.	Port Adelaide 13.11 (89)	Football Park	[Report]

=== Round 4 ===
	Round 4
Saturday, 5 May (2:10 pm)	Central District 24.18 (162)	def.	Norwood 10.12 (72)	Football Park	[Report]
Saturday, 5 May (2:10 pm)	Glenelg 29.19 (193)	def.	South Adelaide 11.7 (73)	Glenelg Oval	[Report]
Saturday, 5 May (2:10 pm)	Port Adelaide 19.7 (121)	def.	North Adelaide 12.11 (83)	Alberton Oval	[Report]
Sunday, 6 May (2:10 pm)	West Torrens 15.19 (109)	def.	Sturt 11.13 (79)	Football Park	[Report]
Monday, 6 May (2:10 pm)	Woodville 22.13 (145)	def.	West Adelaide 10.14 (74)	Football Park	[Report]

=== Round 5 ===
	Round 5
Saturday, 12 May (2:10 pm)	North Adelaide 18.22 (130)	def.	West Adelaide 10.11 (71)	Football Park	[Report]
Saturday, 12 May (2:10 pm)	Woodville 19.12 (126)	def. by	Glenelg 19.13 (127)	Woodville Oval	[Report]
Saturday, 12 May (2:10 pm)	South Adelaide 23.17 (155)	def.	Central District 8.13 (61)	Adelaide Oval	[Report]
Saturday, 12 May (2:10 pm)	Port Adelaide 17.17 (119)	def.	West Torrens 14.12 (96)	Alberton Oval	[Report]
Monday, 14 May (2:10 pm)	Norwood 19.17 (131)	def.	Sturt 13.10 (88)	Football Park	[Report]

=== Round 6 ===
	Round 6
Saturday, 19 May (2:10 pm)	Norwood 16.8 (104)	def.	Glenelg 13.7 (85)	Football Park	[Report]
Saturday, 26 May (2:10 pm)	North Adelaide 19.12 (126)	def.	Woodville 10.6 (66)	Woodville Oval	[Report]
Saturday, 26 May (2:10 pm)	West Adelaide 22.23 (155)	def.	Port Adelaide 10.13 (73)	Richmond Oval	[Report]
Saturday, 26 May (2:10 pm)	Central District 20.13 (133)	def.	Sturt 16.8 (104)	Elizabeth Oval	[Report]
Monday, 28 May (2:10 pm)	South Adelaide 16.12 (108)	def.	West Torrens 7.16 (58)	Football Park	[Report]

=== Round 7 ===
	Round 7
Saturday, 2 June (2:10 pm)	Central District 8.7 (55)	def. by	West Torrens 18.15 (123)	Football Park	[Report]
Saturday, 2 June (2:10 pm)	Sturt 8.11 (59)	def. by	North Adelaide 14.18 (102)	Adelaide Oval	[Report]
Saturday, 2 June (2:10 pm)	Glenelg 16.22 (118)	drew with	West Adelaide 19.4 (118)	Glenelg Oval	[Report]
Saturday, 2 June (2:10 pm)	Norwood 26.10 (166)	def.	South Adelaide 11.13.79	Norwood Oval	[Report]
Saturday, 2 June (2:10 pm)	Port Adelaide 19.13 (127)	def.	Woodville 14.12.96	Alberton Oval	[Report]

=== Round 8 ===
	Round 8
Saturday, 9 June (2:10 pm)	West Torrens 4.6 (30)	def. by	Norwood 23.14 (152)	Football Park	[Report]
Saturday, 9 June (2:10 pm)	Sturt 16.12 (108)	def.	Woodville 12.9 (81)	Adelaide Oval	[Report]
Saturday, 9 June (2:10 pm)	North Adelaide 17.8 (110)	def. by	Glenelg 26.14 (170)	Prospect Oval	[Report]
Saturday, 9 June (2:10 pm)	Central District 24.5 (149)	def.	West Adelaide 17.8 (110)	Elizabeth Oval	[Report]
Monday, 11 June (2:10 pm)	Port Adelaide 20.15 (135)	def.	South Adelaide 19.10 (124)	Football Park	[Report]

=== Round 9 ===
	Round 9
Saturday, 16 June (2:10 pm)	Port Adelaide 21.23 (149)	def.	Sturt 9.10 (64)	Football Park	[Report]
Saturday, 16 June (2:10 pm)	North Adelaide 15.11 (101)	def.	South Adelaide 7.10 (52)	Adelaide Oval	[Report]
Saturday, 16 June (2:10 pm)	Glenelg 14.21 (105)	def.	Central District 10.6 (66)	Glenelg Oval	[Report]
Saturday, 16 June (2:10 pm)	Woodville 9.9 (63)	def. by	Norwood 11.16 (82)	Woodville Oval	[Report]
Sunday, 17 June (2:10 pm)	West Torrens 13.17 (95)	def.	West Adelaide 13.11 (89)	Football Park	[Report]

=== Round 10 ===
	Round 10
Saturday, 23 June (2:10 pm)	South Adelaide 14.21 (105)	def.	Woodville 15.8 (98)	Football Park	[Report]
Saturday, 23 June (2:10 pm)	Central District 15.12 (102)	def. by	Port Adelaide 23.19 (157)	Adelaide Oval	[Report]
Saturday, 23 June (2:10 pm)	West Adelaide 21.18 (144)	def.	Sturt 14.7 (91)	Richmond Oval	[Report]
Saturday, 23 June (2:10 pm)	Glenelg 16.18 (144)	def.	West Torrens 14.7 (91)	Glenelg Oval	[Report]
Saturday, 23 June (2:10 pm)	North Adelaide 6.8 (44)	def. by	Norwood 10.14 (74)	Prospect Oval	[Report]

=== Round 11 ===
	Round 11
Saturday, 30 June (2:10 pm)	Sturt 10.13 (73)	def. by	Glenelg 18.18 (126)	Football Park	[Report]
Saturday, 30 June (2:10 pm)	South Adelaide 13.15 (93)	def.	West Adelaide 5.15 (45)	Adelaide Oval	[Report]
Saturday, 30 June (2:10 pm)	Woodville 11.17 (83)	def.	West Torrens 10.8 (68)	Woodville Oval	[Report]
Saturday, 30 June (2:10 pm)	Central District 9.15 (69)	def. by	North Adelaide 14.14 (98)	Elizabeth Oval	[Report]
Sunday, 1 July (2:10 pm)	Norwood 18.11 (119)	def.	Port Adelaide 13.14 (92)	Football Park	[Report]

=== Round 12 ===
	Round 12
Saturday, 14 July (2:10 pm)	Central District 24.15 (158)	def.	Woodville 9.11 (65)	Elizabeth Oval	[Report]
Saturday, 14 July (2:10 pm)	West Torrens 16.8 (104)	def.	North Adelaide 12.6 (88)	Football Park	[Report]
Saturday, 14 July (2:10 pm)	South Adelaide 19.7 (121)	def.	Sturt 14.12 (96)	Adelaide Oval	[Report]
Saturday, 14 July (2:10 pm)	Norwood 14.18 (102)	def. by	West Adelaide 16.7 (103)	Norwood Oval	[Report]
Sunday, 15 July (2:10 pm)	Port Adelaide 21.15 (141)	def.	Glenelg 18.13 (121)	Football Park	[Report]

=== Round 13 ===
	Round 13
Saturday, 21 July (2:10 pm)	Glenelg 21.19 (145)	def.	South Adelaide 9.15 (69)	Football Park	[Report]
Saturday, 21 July (2:10 pm)	Sturt 15.16 (106)	def.	West Torrens 9.12 (66)	Football Park	[Report]
Saturday, 21 July (2:10 pm)	West Adelaide 16.18 (114)	def. by	Woodville 19.8 (122)	Richmond Oval	[Report]
Saturday, 21 July (2:10 pm)	Central District 18.11 (119)	def.	Norwood 14.14 (98)	Elizabeth Oval	[Report]
Saturday, 21 July (2:10 pm)	North Adelaide 7.13 (55)	def. by	Port Adelaide 11.10 (76)	Prospect Oval	[Report]

=== Round 14 ===
	Round 14
Saturday, 28 July (2:10 pm)	Central District 21.19 (145)	def.	South Adelaide 10.9 (69)	Elizabeth Oval	[Report]
Saturday, 28 July (2:10 pm)	West Torrens 11.7 (83)	def. by	Port Adelaide 23.7 (145)	Football Park	[Report]
Saturday, 28 July (2:10 pm)	Glenelg 22.22 (154)	def.	Woodville 11.17 (83)	Glenelg Oval	[Report]
Saturday, 28 July (2:10 pm)	North Adelaide 26.26 (182)	def.	West Adelaide 7.5 (47)	Prospect Oval	[Report]
Saturday, 28 July (2:10 pm)	Norwood 24.16 (160)	def.	Sturt 7.5 (47)	Norwood Oval	[Report]

=== Round 15 ===
	Round 15
Saturday, 4 August (2:10 pm)	Sturt 13.7 (85)	def. by	Central District 16.16 (112)	Football Park	[Report]
Saturday, 4 August (2:10 pm)	South Adelaide 19.16 (130)	def.	West Torrens 17. 13 (113)	Adelaide Oval	[Report]
Saturday, 4 August (2:10 pm)	Woodville 12.13 (85)	def. by	North Adelaide 14.13 (97)	Woodville Oval	[Report]
Saturday, 4 August (2:10 pm)	Port Adelaide 27.17 (178)	def.	West Adelaide 10.10 (70)	Alberton Oval	[Report]
Sunday, 5 August (2:10 pm)	Glenelg 11.14 (80)	def.	Norwood 11.3 (69)	Football Park	[Report]

=== Round 16 ===
	Round 16
Saturday, 11 August (2:10 pm)	West Adelaide 14.10 (94)	def. by	Glenelg 16.14 (110)	Football Park (crowd: 5,016)
Saturday, 11 August (2:10 pm)	South Adelaide 12.7 (79)	def. by	Norwood 15.14 (104)	Adelaide Oval (crowd: 6,241)
Saturday, 11 August (2:10 pm)	Woodville 16.14 (110)	def. by	Port Adelaide 22.14 (146)	Woodville Oval (crowd: 5,139)
Saturday, 11 August (2:10 pm)	North Adelaide 27.18 (180)	def.	Sturt 3.2 (20)	Prospect Oval (crowd: 3,341)
Saturday, 11 August (2:10 pm)	Central District 16.17 (113)	def.	West Torrens 8.8 (56)	Elizabeth Oval (crowd: 3,787)

=== Round 17 ===
	Round 17
Saturday, 18 August (2:10 pm)	North Adelaide 16.15 (111)	def.	Glenelg 13.12 (90)	Football Park (crowd: 10,229)
Saturday, 18 August (2:10 pm)	Port Adelaide 24.20 (164)	def.	South Adelaide 8.11 (59)	Alberton Oval (crowd: 5,775)
Saturday, 18 August (2:10 pm)	West Adelaide 25.14 (164)	def.	Central District 12.10 (82)	Richmond Oval (crowd: 2,877)
Saturday, 18 August (2:10 pm)	Woodville 22.11 (143)	def.	Sturt 11.7 (73)	Woodville Oval (crowd: 2,008)
Sunday, 19 August (2:10 pm)	West Torrens 10.16 (76)	def. by	Norwood 17.8 (110)	Football Park (crowd: 6,602)

=== Round 18 ===
	Round 18
Saturday, 25 August (2:10 pm)	North Adelaide 19.19 (133)	def.	South Adelaide 14.12 (96)	Football Park (crowd: 3,538)
Saturday, 25 August (2:10 pm)	Sturt 10.14 (74)	def. by	Port Adelaide 34.18 (222)	Adelaide Oval (crowd: 6,334)
Saturday, 25 August (2:10 pm)	Central District 14.11 (95)	def. by	Glenelg 17.16 (118)	Elizabeth Oval (crowd: 4,846)
Saturday, 25 August (2:10 pm)	West Adelaide 15.17 (107)	def.	West Torrens 9.14 (68)	Richmond Oval (crowd: 2,702)
Saturday, 25 August (2:10 pm)	Norwood 25.19 (159)	def.	Woodville 9.12 (66)	Norwood Oval (crowd: 6,585)

=== Round 19 ===
	Round 19
Saturday, 1 September (1:00 pm)	West Adelaide 19.16 (130)	def.	Sturt 10.19 (79)	Football Park (crowd: 7,220)
Saturday, 1 September (4:00 pm)	Glenelg 19.20 (134)	def.	West Torrens 8.11 (59)	Football Park (crowd: 7,220)
Saturday, 1 September (2:10 pm)	South Adelaide 21.17 (137)	def.	Woodville 10.10 (70)	Adelaide Oval (crowd: 2,429)
Saturday, 1 September (2:10 pm)	Port Adelaide 19.20 (134)	def.	Central District 7.13 (55)	Alberton Oval (crowd: 7,012)
Saturday, 1 September (2:10 pm)	Norwood 10.10 (70)	def. by	North Adelaide 21.13 (139)	Norwood Oval (crowd: 11,373)

=== Round 20 ===
	Round 20
Saturday, 8 September (2:10 pm)	Norwood 9.14 (68)	def. by	Port Adelaide 21.24 (150)	Football Park (crowd: 22,217)
Saturday, 8 September (2:10 pm)	Woodville 24.10 (154)	def.	West Torrens 15.19 (109)	Adelaide Oval (crowd: 7,770)
Saturday, 8 September (2:10 pm)	West Adelaide 11.17 (83)	def. by	South Adelaide 20.17 (137)	Richmond Oval (crowd: 5,286)
Saturday, 8 September (2:10 pm)	North Adelaide 20.16 (136)	def.	Central District 12.19 (91)	Prospect Oval (crowd: 4,922)
Saturday, 8 September (2:10 pm)	Glenelg 31.14 (200)	def.	Sturt 8.13 (61)	Glenelg Oval (crowd: 4,776)

Woodville and West Torrens play their final senior match as independent clubs before merging to become Woodville-West Torrens from 1991 onwards. West Torrens player Ian Hanna, who career had ended due to a broken neck, was sent on the field in the dying minutes. With the game won, Woodville players "allowed" him to kick a goal.

== Ladder ==
1990 Ladder
Pos	Team	Pld	W	L	D	PF	PA	PP	Pts
1	Port Adelaide (P)	20	17	3	0	2713	1806	60.04	34
2	Glenelg	20	16	3	1	2545	1767	59.02	33
3	North Adelaide	20	14	6	0	2203	1594	58.02	28
4	Norwood	20	12	8	0	2159	1809	54.41	24
5	South Adelaide	20	9	11	0	1972	2199	47.28	18
6	West Adelaide	20	8	11	1	2001	2316	46.35	17
7	Central District	20	8	12	0	1998	2211	47.47	16
8	Woodville	20	7	13	0	1926	2259	46.02	14
9	West Torrens	20	6	14	0	1665	2136	43.80	12
10	Sturt	20	2	18	0	1577	2662	37.20	4

Rules for classification: 1) points; 2) percentage; 3) number of points for.
(P) Premiers

== Finals series ==
=== Week 1 ===
	Semi-finals
QF: Saturday, 15 Sep (2:10 pm)	Glenelg 17.16 (118)	def.	North Adelaide 14.11 (95)	Football Park (crowd: 32,304)	Match report
EF1: Sunday, 16 Sep (2:10 pm)	Norwood 13.12 (90)	def. by	South Adelaide 19.18 (132)	Football Park (crowd: 31,492)	Match report

=== Week 2 ===
	Semi-finals
SF2: Saturday, 22 Sep (2:10 pm)	Port Adelaide 15.9 (99)	def. by	Glenelg 16.14 (110)	Football Park (crowd: 23,102)	Match report
SF1: Sunday, 23 Sep (2:10 pm)	North Adelaide 23.14 (152)	def.	South Adelaide 14.12 (96)	Football Park (crowd: 19,492)	Match report

=== Week 3 ===
	Preliminary Finals
PF: Saturday, 29 Sep (2:10 pm)	Port Adelaide 28.14 (182)	def.	North Adelaide 14.7 (91)	Football Park (crowd: 34,102)	Match report

=== Week 4 ===
Grand Final
Sunday, 7 October	Glenelg	def. by	Port Adelaide	Football Park (crowd: 50,589)	Report
5.2 (32); 6.7 (43); 9.11 (65); 13.15 (93)	Q1; Q2; Q3; Final	4.6 (30); 10.7 (67); 13.9 (87); 16.12 (108)	Umpires: Rick Kinnear, Mark Mackie; Jack Oatey Medal: George Fiacchi; Television broadcast: Channel 9 National anthem: Kate Ceberano
Fidge 5 Murphy 3 Christie, Liptak, Jameson, Marshall, Salisbury 1	Goals	6 Hodges; 3 Settre; 2 Smith, Wanganeen; 1 Mahney, S. Williams, M. Williams
This was the last SANFL match played before the introduction of a South Australian team into the Australian Football League.
