= 1989 SANFL Grand Final =

1989 Australian rules football final

Port Adelaide	North Adelaide
15.18 (108)	1.8 (14)
	1	2	3	4
PA	5.5 (35)	9.7 (61)	11.11 (77)	15.18 (108)
NA	0.2 (2)	0.3 (3)	1.6 (12)	1.8 (14)
- Date: Saturday, 7 October (2:10 pm)
- Stadium: Football Park
- Attendance: 50,487
- Umpires: Laurie Argent, Michael Abbott
- Coin toss won by: Port Adelaide
- Kicked toward: South End

Accolades
- Jack Oatey Medallist: Russell Johnston
- Australian Football Hall of Fame: John Cahill (2002); Darren Jarman (2007); Greg Phillips (2020)

Broadcast in Australia
- Network: Channel 9
- Commentators: Ian Day, Kym Dillon, Neville Roberts, Graham Campbell, Peter Carey, Brian Cunningham

The 1989 SANFL Grand Final was an Australian rules football game contested between the Port Adelaide Football Club and the North Adelaide Football Club, held at Football Park on 7 October 1989. It was the 88th annual Grand Final of the South Australian National Football League, staged to determine the premiers of the 1989 SANFL season. The match, attended by 50,487 spectators, was won by Port Adelaide by a margin of 94 points, marking that clubs twenty-ninth premiership.

Played in blustery conditions the normally precise North Adelaide could not hit the mark with their passes and were dominated at ground level by a well coached Port Adelaide.

In a pre-game press conference before the game North Adelaide coach Mick Nunan quipped that "We have one goal in mind". North Adelaide would end up only kicking one for the whole Grand Final.

Game entertainment was provided by the Pembroke Girls choir, under the direction of Mr. Colin Curtis.

== Scorecard ==
1989 SANFL Grand Final
Saturday 7 October (2:10 pm)	Port Adelaide	def.	North Adelaide	Football Park (crowd: 50,487)
5.5 (35); 9.7 (61); 11.11 (77); 15.18 (108)	Q1; Q2; Q3; Final	0.2 (2); 0.3 (3); 1.6 (12); 1.8 (14)
Hodges, D. Smith – 4	Goals	1 – Burton

Port Adelaide
B:	4 George Fiacchi	7 Roger Delaney	22 Greg Boyd
HB:	5 Bruce Abernethy	20 Greg Phillips	32 Paul Northeast
C:	27 David Hutton	10 Stephen Williams	12 Simon Tregenza
HF:	13 Rohan Smith	28 Darren Smith	14 Wayne Mahney
F:	15 David Hynes	11 Scott Hodges	21 David Brown
Foll:	1 Russell Johnston (c)	3 Andrew Obst	2 Tim Ginever
Int:	35 Russell Boyd	6 Phil Harrison	
Coach:	John Cahill		
