= Fos Williams Medal =

Award for Australian rules football players

The Fos Williams Medal has been awarded since 1981 to the best Australian rules football player from South Australia during Inter-State or Inter-Competition matches. The medal is named in honour of legendary South Australian National Football League (SANFL) player and coach Fos Williams.

Originally the award was made in respect of State of Origin matches. Since that competition folded in 1999, the medal has been awarded during games where the SANFL plays other state competitions in State League representative matches (e.g. WAFL v SANFL). The award is usually voted on by a panel selected by the SANFL from significant football identities present at the match, and may include past players, coaches and journalists.

== Medal winners ==
* denotes State League clash, not an AFL-level Origin match
♦ South Australia played no state games in 1990 so the SANFL played a City v Country match at Football Park which was essentially an All-Stars game with teams divided into those recruited from SA's country leagues and those from Adelaide. The concept only lasted one season due to poor attendance.

Year	Fos Williams Medallist	Player's club(s)	Opponent	Venue
1981	Peter Carey	Glenelg	Western Australia	Subiaco Oval
1982	Stephen Copping	Essendon / Glenelg	Victoria	Football Park
1982	Paul Weston	Glenelg	Western Australia	Football Park
1982	Greg Phillips	Port Adelaide	Western Australia	Subiaco Oval
1983	Michael Aish	Norwood	Victoria	Football Park
1983*	Craig Williams	West Adelaide	Western Australia	Subiaco Oval
1984	Stephen Kernahan	Glenelg	Victoria	Football Park
1984	Garry McIntosh	Norwood	Western Australia	Football Park
1985	Peter Motley	Sturt	Victoria	Football Park
1985	Craig Bradley	Port Adelaide	Western Australia	Subiaco Oval
1986	Craig Bradley	Carlton / Port Adelaide	Victoria	Football Park
1986	Andrew Jarman	North Adelaide	Western Australia	Football Park
1987	Chris McDermott	Glenelg	Victoria	Football Park
1987	Andrew Jarman	North Adelaide	Western Australia	Subiaco Oval
1988	Mark Mickan	Brisbane / West Adelaide	New South Wales	Football Park
1988	Stephen Kernahan	Carlton / Glenelg	Victoria	Football Park
1988	Michael Redden	North Adelaide	Western Australia	Football Park
1989	Andrew Jarman	North Adelaide	Victoria	MCG
1990♦	Andrew Jarman	Norwood	City v Country	Football Park
1991	Craig Bradley	Carlton / Port Adelaide	Victoria	Football Park
1991*	Mark Naley	South Adelaide	WAFL	Subiaco Oval
1992	David Hynes	West Coast / Port Adelaide	Victoria	Football Park
1992*	Garry McIntosh	Norwood	WAFL	Football Park
1993	Greg Anderson	Adelaide / Port Adelaide	Western Australia	Football Park
1993	Craig Bradley	Carlton / Port Adelaide	Victoria	MCG
1993*	Tony Lynn	Central District	WAFL	WACA
1994	Andrew Jarman	Adelaide / Norwood	Victoria	Football Park
1994*	Scott Burns	Norwood	WAFL	Football Park
1995	Simon Tregenza	Adelaide / Port Adelaide	Victoria	MCG
1995*	Garry McIntosh	Norwood	Tasmania	North Hobart Oval
1996	Tony Modra	Adelaide / West Adelaide	Western Australia	Football Park
1996*	Josh Francou	North Adelaide	WAFL	Subiaco Oval
1997	Brayden Lyle	Port Adelaide	Victoria	Football Park
1997*	James Thiessen	Norwood	ACTAFL	Manuka Oval
1998	Michael O'Loughlin	Sydney / Central District	Western Australia	Football Park
1998*	Paul McCormack	Norwood	WAFL	Football Park
1999	Andrew McKay	Carlton / Glenelg	Victoria	MCG
1999*	Anthony Harvey	Norwood	VFL	MCG
2000*	Stephen Carter	Port Adelaide	WAFL	Adelaide Oval
2001*	Ben Hollands	West Adelaide	VFL	Adelaide Oval
2002*	Ben Hollands	West Adelaide	VFL	Adelaide Oval
2003*	Brett Backwell	Glenelg	WAFL	Fremantle Oval
2005*	Scott Borlace	Norwood	VFL	North Port Oval
2006*	Daniel Schell	Central District	WAFL	Adelaide Oval
2008*	Clint Alleway	North Adelaide	VFL	Adelaide Oval
2009*	Jade Sheedy	Sturt	WAFL	Leederville Oval
2012*	Adam Grocke	Woodville-West Torrens	WAFL	Glenelg Oval
2013*	Ryan Ferguson	West Adelaide	NEAFL North	Richmond Oval
2014*	Zane Kirkwood	Sturt	VFL	North Port Oval
2015*	Tom Keough	West Adelaide	WAFL	Lathlain Park
2016*	Zane Kirkwood	Sturt	VFL	Adelaide Oval
2018*	Zane Kirkwood	Sturt	WAFL	Adelaide Oval
2019*	Michael Knoll	South Adelaide	WAFL	Perth Stadium
2021*	Matthew Broadbent	South Adelaide	WAFL	Adelaide Oval
2022*	Casey Voss	Sturt	WAFL	Perth Stadium
2023*	James Rowe	Woodville-West Torrens	WAFL	Adelaide Oval
2024*	Jez McLennan	Central District	VFL	Glenelg Oval
2024*	Jez McLennan	Central District	WAFL	Perth Stadium
2025*	Corey Lyons	Glenelg	VFL	Tanunda Recreation Park
2025*	Mani Liddy	Central District	WAFL	Adelaide Oval
2026*	Tom Lewis	Sturt	VFL	Glenelg Oval
2026*	Beau Thomas	Central District	WAFL	Leederville Oval

== See also ==
- Interstate matches in Australian rules football
- Simpson Medal – Western Australia
- E. J. Whitten Medal – Victoria (State of Origin)
- Frank Johnson Medal – Victoria (VFL)
