= John Fidge =

Australian rules footballer (born 1966)

Personal information
- Full name: John Fidge
- Born: 4 May 1966 (age 60)
- Original teams: St Peter's, East Bentleigh (MSJFL)
- Height: 182 cm (6 ft 0 in)
- Weight: 82 kg (12 st 13 lb)
- Position: Forward

Playing career^{1}
Years	Club	Games (Goals)
1984–86	Melbourne	32 (54)
1987–89	Brisbane Bears	27 (38)
1991	Essendon	0 (0)
1989–1993	Glenelg (SANFL)	69 (316)
1994	Frankston (VFA)	10 (31)
Total		138 (439)
- ^{1} Playing statistics correct to the end of 1991.

John Fidge (born 4 May 1966) is a former Australian rules footballer who played with Melbourne and the Brisbane Bears in the Victorian Football League (VFL), Glenelg in the South Australian National Football League (SANFL) and Frankston in the Victorian Football Association (VFA).

Originally from St Peter's Football Club in the Moorabbin Saints Junior Football League, Fidge made his VFL debut for Melbourne as a 17-year-old centre half forward in 1984, starring with four goals and 23 disposals in a loss to Essendon. He finished his first season with 27 goals from 12 appearances, missing games mid-season with a thigh injury.

Fidge played in Melbourne's 1984 Reserves Premiership team against Carlton, but was suspended for two matches following the grand final. He would return to play 16 senior matches in 1985 and booted six goals against North Melbourne at the MCG, his best return for Melbourne. It was also the first year where he played at Melbourne alongside his brother Ted. He suffered from stress fractures in his foot during 1986 but kicked 12 goals from his four games.

Fidge joined the new Brisbane Bears team for their inaugural season in 1987 and played in every one of their first eight games. Late in the season Fidge kicked six goals against Fitzroy to equal his career best and kicked a further five goals and six behinds the following week against his former club. Injuries returned in 1988 and Fidge, who had an icy relationship with coach Peter Knights, was sacked a few games into the 1989 VFL season.

For the rest of 1989, Fidge played with Glenelg in the SANFL. He was selected by the Sydney Swans in the 1989 VFL Draft but chose to remain in South Australia. His decision to stay at Glenelg in 1990 paid off, as he kicked 124 goals for the year, five of them in the Grand Final loss to Port Adelaide. Despite his large goal tally for the season Fidge did not take the Ken Farmer Medal, which went to Port Adelaide's Scott Hodges, who kicked 153 goals.

Recruited by Essendon with the 24th pick of the 1990 AFL draft, Fidge did not play a senior game for them and returned to Glenelg.

He again topped Glenelg's goal-kicking in 1992 with 92 goals and once more finished second in the league. After Fidge became only the fourth player (Note: The others are: 1. Roy Bent, with 10 goals for Norwood against West Torrens in the 1924 First Semi-Final; 2. Rick Davies, with 10 goals for Sturt against Norwood in the 1983 Preliminary Final; 3. Hodges, with 13 goals for Port Adelaide against North Adelaide in the 1990 Preliminary Final) to kick ten goals in a SANFL final when he kicked eleven in the Preliminary against Woodville-West Torrens, Glenelg made the Grand Final once again, but Fidge's four goals were not enough to get them over the line. The following year Fidge kicked a more modest 56 goals but this saw him top his club's goal-kicking for the third and final time.

Fidge spent the 1994 season with VFA side Frankston before retiring.
