= Stephen Williams (footballer) =

Australian rules footballer and coach

Personal information
- Born: 6 May 1961 (age 65)
- Original team: West Adelaide (SANFL)
- Draft: No. 40, 1986 national draft

Playing career^{1}
Years	Club	Games (Goals)
1979–86, 1988–95	Port Adelaide (SANFL)	268 (288)
1987	Brisbane Bears (VFL)	4 (1)

Coaching career
Years	Club	Games (W–L–D)
1996–2003	Port Adelaide (SANFL)	163 (100–61–2) 61.34%
- ^{1} Playing statistics correct to the end of 1995.

Career highlights
- 6x Port Adelaide premiership player (1988, 1989, 1990, 1992, 1994, 1995); 3x Port Adelaide premiership coach (1996, 1998, 1999); Port Adelaide life member

Stephen Williams (born 6 May 1961) is a former Australian rules footballer, who played for the Port Adelaide in the SANFL and the Brisbane Bears in the AFL and was previously head coach of the Immanuel College first XVIII side.

== Early life ==
Stephen Williams is the son of Port Adelaide legend Fos Williams, and younger brother of twins Mark and Anthony. Stephen Williams was originally listed with West Adelaide Football Club along with Mark and Anthony, where father Fos was coach, but Stephen did not play any senior games for West Adelaide. When Fos left West Adelaide, the Williams brothers moved to Port Adelaide in 1979.

== Port Adelaide player ==
Williams made his league debut for Port Adelaide in 1979. After playing only 16 games in his first 3 years, Williams played 19 senior games in 1982. However, Williams continued to be a fringe player up until (and including) 1986, playing a handful of games in the reserves each year.

In 1986, Williams was drafted by the Brisbane Bears at number 40 in the AFL national draft. Williams played 4 games for the Bears in 1987 (alongside brother Mark), and returned to the Port Adelaide in 1988. After his brief stint in the (then) VFL, Williams became a key player for Port Adelaide. Williams played in the Port Adelaide premiership teams of 1988,89,90,92,94,95 and retired from playing at the end of the 1995 season. Williams was awarded life membership of the Port Adelaide Football Club in 1989 and was inducted into the South Australian Football Hall of Fame in 2016.

== Port Adelaide SANFL coach ==
In 1996, Williams was appointed assistant coach of Port Adelaide. When Coach John Cahill departed mid-season to prepare and lead Port Adelaide's entry into the AFL, Williams assumed the role of head coach for the SANFL team. Port Adelaide won the SANFL premiership in that year. Williams also coached Port Adelaide to premierships in 1998 and 1999.

== Port Adelaide AFL assistant coach ==
Williams left the Port Adelaide (SANFL) at the end of the 2003 season to take up a role at the Port Adelaide in the AFL, where brother Mark was coach. As of 2008, Williams is their Assistant Development Coach.
