= David Hutton (Australian footballer) =

Personal information
- Full name: David S. Hutton
- Born: 29 September 1965 (age 61)

Playing career
Years	Club	Games (Goals)
1985–1995	Port Adelaide	159 (89)

Career highlights
- 5x Port Adelaide premiership player (1988, 1989, 1990, 1992, 1994)

David Hutton (b. 29 September 1965) is a retired Australian rules footballer who played for the Port Adelaide Football Club in the South Australian National Football League (SANFL).
