= Tim Ginever =

Australian rules footballer and coach

- Tim Ginever in 2019

Personal information
- Nickname: Timmy
- Born: 13 April 1966 (age 60)
- Height: 172 cm (5 ft 8 in)
- Weight: 70 kg (154 lb)

Playing career^{1}
Years	Club	Games (Goals)
1983–1997	Port Adelaide (SANFL)	314 (302)

Representative team honours
Years	Team	Games (Goals)
1995	South Australia	1 (0)

Coaching career
Years	Club	Games (W–L–D)
2006–2009	Port Adelaide (SANFL)	82 (33–48–1)
- ^{1} Playing statistics correct to the end of 1997.

Career highlights
- Port Adelaide premiership player (1988, 1989, 1990, 1992, 1994, 1995, 1996); Port Adelaide captain (1994–1997); Port Adelaide best and fairest (1994, 1997); South Australian Football Hall of Fame (2015)

Timothy Ginever (born 13 April 1966) is a former Australian rules footballer in the South Australian National Football League (SANFL), playing for Port Adelaide.

== Early life ==
Tim Ginever is the seventh of 10 children and says that Australian Football helped his English father and South American mother transition into Australian life.

== Football ==
Ginever made his SANFL debut as a 17-year-old rover in 1983. If you were to undertake a detailed objective assessment of Tim Ginever's football ability - marking, kicking, pace, ball skills and so forth - you might conceivably end up wondering how they could possibly be combined to produce a player of league standard. Tim Ginever, however, was much more than just an average league player; he was arguably one of the most important SANFL footballers of the 1980s and 1990s, and provided conclusively persuasive evidence that success in football is at least as much attributable to mental as to physical capabilities.

1996 Port Adelaide guernsey on display in the State Library of South Australia featuring signatures from Tim Ginever, John Cahill and Stephen Carter.

When Tim Ginever entered the playing arena, he was regarded as a significant SANFL footballer of the 1980s and 1990s. Known for his competitive intensity, he played 314 league games for Port Adelaide, serving as team captain from 1994 to 1977 and leading the clubs to multiple premiership titles.

== Coaching ==
Ginever was appointed assistant coach of the Port Adelaide Magpies in 2005 under the legendary John Cahill, who was brought back as coach for one year while Ginever served his apprenticeship. Ginever then took over as coach in 2006 for four seasons but was not able to reproduce the same success he had as a player. On 14 August 2009, Ginever announced his retirement from coaching at the end of the 2009 SANFL minor round. In a statement issued by the Port Adelaide Magpies Football Club, it says the decision was a mutual one between Ginever and the Club's Board. Ginever himself was quoted "I only gave up Coaching due to popular demand"

== Role in Port Adelaide reunification ==
Tim was actively involved in the OnePAFC campaign designed to garner support for the reunification of the Port Adelaide Football Club and the Port Adelaide Magpies Football Club. As of 2011 the two clubs are a single and administrative legal entity. In 2014 the club's players not named in the AFL would play for the club in the SANFL.

== Football commentary ==
He is now working for Adelaide radio station 5AA, part of Australian rules football coverage and street reporter for the Breakfast Show in 2011 & 2012. Known for his quick wit and larrikin sense of humour off the field, Ginever has also worked as a football commentator for radio station Triple M. He is the current Special Comments man on Ch 7 coverage of the SANFL. Mon to Fri he is the Commercial Sales Manager for PAFC responsible for Sponsorship & Hospitality revenue at the club.

== Family ==
Ginever's son Darcy Ginever made his senior debut for Port Adelaide in 2018.

== Honours ==
In 2015, Ginever was inducted into the South Australian Football Hall of Fame.
