= Geoff Phelps =

Australian rules footballer

Personal information
- Full name: Geoffrey R. Phelps

Playing career
Years	Club	Games (Goals)
1986-1990	Port Adelaide	115

Career highlights
- 2x Port Adelaide premiership player (1988, 1990)

Geoff Phelps was an Australian rules footballer for the Port Adelaide Football Club in the South Australian National Football League.

Recruited from the Eyre Peninsula, Phelps was a part of both Port Adelaide’s 1988 and 1990 premiership teams. Predominately a defender, however he was quite versatile also being able to play up forward and in the ruck.

In the 1990 SANFL grand final, he began the game on the interchange however came on during the second quarter to play Full Forward after Scott Hodges was carried off the ground.

In 1986 he won Port Adelaide’s best first year player award.
