= Wayne Mahney =

Australian footballer

Personal information
- Born: 5 May 1967 (age 59)
- Original team: St Michael's College
- Draft: 32, 1986 VFL draft

Playing career
Years	Club	Games (Goals)
1984–1991	Port Adelaide	108 (92)

Career highlights
- 3x Port Adelaide premiership player (1988, 1989, 1990)

Wayne Mahney (b. 5 May 1967) is a former Australian rules footballer for the Port Adelaide Football Club in the South Australian National Football League (SANFL).

Mahney played in all three of Port Adelaide’s premierships they won consecutively in 1988, 89, 90. Kicking a goal in the 1990 decider v Glenelg, before succumbing to a hamstring injury. He was also a part of the 1989 Foundation Cup winning team which was the SANFL’s pre season competition.

Mahney was selected by Footscray with pick 32 at the 1986 VFL draft, but chose to remain in South Australia playing for Port Adelaide rather than heading to Victoria.

Mahney's father Graham Mahney was a member of Port Adelaide’s 1959 Premiership side.
