= George Fiacchi =

Australian rules footballer

Personal information
- Full name: George John Fiacchi
- Nickname: Robin
- Born: 26 July 1964 (age 62)
- Position: Back pocket

Playing career
Years	Club	Games (Goals)
1985–1997	Port Adelaide	236 (53)

Representative team honours
Years	Team	Games (Goals)
	South Australia	1

Career highlights
- 7x Port Adelaide premiership player (1988, 1989, 1990, 1992, 1994, 1995, 1996); Jack Oatey Medal (1990); Port Adelaide Hall of Fame (2019)

George John Fiacchi (born 26 July 1964) is a former Australian rules footballer who played for the Port Adelaide Football Club in the South Australian National Football League (SANFL). During his career he won seven premierships for the club and was named best on ground during the 1990 SANFL Grand Final. Fiacchi's defensive partnership with full back Roger Delaney was exceptional, with the pair popularly being dubbed 'Batman' (Delaney) and 'Robin'. He has subsequently served on the board of Port Adelaide Football Club.
