= Adrian Settre =

Personal information
- Full name: Adrian Settre

Playing career
Years	Club	Games (Goals)
1988–1998	Port Adelaide (SANFL)	121 (105)

Adrian Settre is a former Australian rules footballer for the Port Adelaide Football Club in the South Australian National Football League. Settre played a key part in Port Adelaide's 15 point win over Glenelg in the 1990 SANFL Grand Final kicking three crucial and spectacular goals. He would also play in Port Adelaide’s 1992 Premiership win against Glenelg.
