= John Cahill (footballer) =

Australian rules footballer, born 1940

Personal information
- Full name: John V. Cahill
- Born: 27 April 1940 (age 86); Adelaide, South Australia
- Original team: South Adelaide (SANFL)
- Height: 180 cm (5 ft 11 in)
- Weight: 75 kg (165 lb)
- Position: Centre

Playing career^{1}
Years	Club	Games (Goals)
1958–1973	Port Adelaide (SANFL)	264 (286)

Representative team honours
Years	Team	Games (Goals)
	South Australia	29

Coaching career
Years	Club	Games (W–L–D)
1974–1982	Port Adelaide (SANFL)	216 (158–54–4)
1983–1984	Collingwood (VFL)	47 (27–20–0)
1985–1987	West Adelaide (SANFL)	69 (34–35–0)
1988–1996	Port Adelaide (SANFL)	205 (153–52–0)
1997–1998	Port Adelaide (AFL)	44 (19–23–2)
2005	Port Adelaide (SANFL)	23 (13–10–0)
2008	South Adelaide (SANFL)	8 (3–4–1)
Total		612 (407–198–7)
- ^{1} Playing statistics correct to the end of 2008.

Career highlights
- Club: 4× Port Adelaide premiership player (1959, 1962, 1963, 1965); 4× Port Adelaide best and fairest (1966, 1968, 1970, 1973); McCallum Medallist 1956 (under-17 with South Adelaide); Port Adelaide captain 1968–73; Port Adelaide leading goalkicker 1973; Coach: 10× Port Adelaide premiership coach (1977, 1979, 1980, 1981, 1988, 1989, 1990, 1992, 1994, 1995); West Adelaide Escort Cup premiership coach 1985; West Adelaide Foundation Cup premiership coach 1987; Port Adelaide Foundation Cup premiership coach 1989; Representative: 29 games for South Australia; All-Australian (1969); Honours: Australian Football Hall of Fame inductee; South Australian Football Hall of Fame inaugural inductee 2002; Port Adelaide greatest team (wing); Namesake of Port Adelaide's Best and Fairest award.

John Cahill (born 27 April 1940) is a former Australian rules football player and coach. During his career he played football for Port Adelaide, and coached Port Adelaide, West Adelaide, South Adelaide in the South Australian National Football League (SANFL) and Collingwood in the Victorian Football League (VFL) and Port Adelaide in the Australian Football League (AFL).

The Port Adelaide Football Club honoured Cahill by naming the award for the club's best and fairest player the John Cahill Medal.

== SANFL playing career ==
=== Port Adelaide (SANFL) ===
Cahill played 264 games and kicked 286 goals for Port Adelaide in the SANFL from 1958 to 1973. He captained Port Adelaide from 1967 to 1973 and skippered South Australia in 1969 and 1970. Cahill also played in four premierships as a Port Adelaide player in the SANFL in 1959, 1962, 1963 and 1965.

Cahill also played 29 state matches for South Australia.

== Coaching career ==
=== Port Adelaide Football club senior coach (SANFL) (1974–1982) ===
After retiring as a player, Cahill took up senior coaching. Starting with Port Adelaide, he would lead the club to four premierships in the SANFL in 1977, 1979, 1980 and 1981.

=== Collingwood Football Club senior coach (VFL) (1983–1984) ===
Collingwood embarked on a nation-wide search for a senior coach at the end of the 1982 season to replace Tom Hafey who was sacked in the middle of the 1982 season and replaced for the balance of that season by caretaker senior coach Mick Erwin, whom Collingwood did not retain for the 1983 season. Collingwood were seeking to choose the best possible candidate in Australia as it desperately sought an end to an embarrassing premiership drought. The new Collingwood board, who had taken over the club after the 1982 election, finally settled on Cahill, a legendary South Australian player and coach, who hadn't even applied for the job after it was advertised across Australia. Instead, Cahill was asked to apply for the position, and he finally agreed to take the position on, mindful that the new board was about to embark on an almost unprecedented recruiting campaign. In being appointed the new Collingwood Football Club senior coach, Cahill would have access to an array of new and recycled talent that would be coming to the club, including David Cloke and Geoff Raines from the Richmond Football Club, Shane Morwood from the Sydney Swans, as well as three potential stars from interstate, Greg Phillips, Mike Richardson and Gary Shaw.

Cahill would spend two seasons as Collingwood senior coach. He led the VFL Magpies to sixth in 1983 and third in 1984. In the 1984 season, Cahill guided Collingwood to the preliminary finals, where they were eliminated by the eventual premiers Essendon Bombers by 133 points. It was a frustrating end to the season and to Cahill's coaching time at Collingwood. Cahill said after the thrashing that he would

never recover from the humiliation of the shocking performance of his players against Essendon

On the Wednesday after the humiliation, Cahill sent a letter of resignation to the club, when he stepped down as senior coach of Collingwood, and although the VFL Magpies did not wish to lose him he remained steadfast. Cahill was replaced as Collingwood senior coach by Bob Rose, who returned to the club in his second stint as senior coach.

Cahill coached Collingwood in a total of 47 games for 27 wins and 20 losses or a winning percentage of 57 percent.

Years later in 2022 in a radio interview with SEN, Cahill revealed that the main reason why he left Collingwood when he stepped down as senior coach was because "there was no chain of command and there was no structure through the club" and "the administration could’ve been improved a lot". Also, Cahill stated during his tenure as senior coach of Collingwood, "I had players just drop at my door on training nights, 'I’ve just recruited this player for you'. I couldn't believe it. "That wouldn't happen at Port Adelaide. You'd go through the coach or the selection committee if we needed a player.

=== West Adelaide senior coach (SANFL) (1985–1987) ===
Cahill then returned to Adelaide where he coached West Adelaide in the SANFL from 1985 to 1987 taking the club to 3rd in his first season and the league Night Premierships in 1985 and 1987.

=== Port Adelaide Football club senior coach (SANFL) (1988–1996) ===
It was always at Port Adelaide where Cahill's heart lay. He returned to Alberton in 1988 and led the club to six more premierships in 1989, 1990, 1992, 1994 and 1995 before ending his SANFL coaching after 14 rounds of the 1996 season.

=== Port Adelaide Football club senior coach (AFL) (1997–1998) ===
Cahill then went to move on to become the inaugural AFL Port Adelaide Football Club senior coach in 1997, when they were admitted into the AFL. Cahill then set about forming a group which would form the inaugural squad. Brownlow Medallist and 1990 Port Adelaide premiership player, Gavin Wanganeen, was signed from Essendon and made captain of a team made up of six existing Port Adelaide players, two from the Adelaide Crows, seven players from other SANFL clubs and 14 recruits from interstate. In Cahill's first season as Port Adelaide senior coach in its inaugural season in the AFL in the 1997 season, Cahill guided Port to finish ninth on the ladder, just missing out of the finals with ten wins, one draw and eleven losses. In the 1998 season, Cahill guided Port to finish tenth on the ladder with nine wins, one draw and 12 losses. Cahill left the club at the end of the 1998 season, and was then replaced as Port Adelaide's senior coach in the AFL by his assistant coach Mark Williams.

Cahill coached Port Adelaide Football club in the AFL to a total of 44 games with 19 wins, 23 losses and 2 draws for a winning percentage of 45 percent.

In 2001, it was revealed that in mid-1998, Cahill was informed he would not be coaching Port Adelaide Power after the 1998 season due to a dispute with the Port Adelaide Power's Football Operations Manager, Mick Moylan. Cahill said that he found this a great disappointment but at the same time, there was a feeling of relief.

=== Port Adelaide Football club senior coach (SANFL) (2005) ===
However, in 2005, he was appointed senior coach of the Port Adelaide Magpies for one season to revitalise the struggling club. He took them to their first finals series in three seasons and they finished a respectable third. At the end of the season, he announced that he was retiring from coaching.

=== South Adelaide senior coach (2008) ===
However, in 2008, he signed a two-year coaching deal with South Adelaide as senior coach in an attempt to pull them out of their current slump. He resigned eight matches into the season, apparently citing "outside influences".

== Personal life ==
1996 Port Adelaide guernsey on display in the State Library of South Australia featuring signatures from John Cahill, Tim Ginever and Stephen Carter.

His son is Darren Cahill (born 1965), a former professional tennis player from Australia and tennis coach. His brother Darrell Cahill also played for Port Adelaide, playing 265 games. His daughter Julie married Scott Hodges who played for Port Adelaide, Adelaide and Port Adelaide in the AFL, but have since divorced. His granddaughter Charlee Hodges played netball for the Adelaide Thunderbirds. His uncle, Laurie Cahill was also a coach in the SANFL, coaching South Adelaide in 1947–8 and 1957 and West Adelaide from 1953 until 1956, taking the latter club to two Grand Finals in 1954 and 1956. Prior to that he was a dual premiership player with South Adelaide in the SANFL and a member of VFL side Richmond's 1943 grand final winning team. He is first cousin to Barrie Barbary.

In 2010, he purchased an EFM Health Clubs Franchise located on-site at Pulteney Grammar School in the Adelaide CBD.
