= Greg Phillips =

Australian rules footballer

Personal information
- Nickname: Kutchie
- Born: 26 March 1959 (age 67)
- Height: 188 cm (6 ft 2 in)
- Weight: 98 kg (216 lb)

Playing career^{1}
Years	Club	Games (Goals)
1976–82, 1987–93	Port Adelaide (SANFL)	305 (84)
1983–86	Collingwood (VFL)	84 (12)
Total		389 (96)

Representative team honours
Years	Team	Games (Goals)
1978–1990	South Australia	20
- ^{1} Playing statistics correct to the end of 1993.

Career highlights
- Club: 8× Port Adelaide premiership player (1977, 1979, 1980, 1981, 1988, 1989, 1990, 1992); Port Adelaide premiership captain (1992); Port Adelaide best & fairest (1988); Port Adelaide captain (1991-1993); Representative: All Australian (1980); Fos Williams Medallist (1982, SA v WA at Subiaco Oval); Honours: Port Adelaide's greatest team (centre half back); Port Adelaide life member; SANFL life member; South Australian Football Hall of Fame Inaugural inductee (2002); Australian Football Hall of Fame inductee 2020

Greg Phillips (born 26 March 1959) is a former Australian rules football player who played for the Port Adelaide Football Club in the South Australian National Football League (SANFL) and Collingwood Football Club in the Victorian Football League (VFL).

== Port Adelaide (1976–1982) ==
Greg Phillips started his career in 1976 at Port Adelaide and was a key member of their defence during a successful era for the club. At the 1980 Adelaide State of Origin Carnival, he was selected in the All-Australian team.

== Collingwood (1983–1986) ==
Phillips joined VFL club Collingwood in 1983 following his Port Adelaide coach John Cahill to the club. Phillips played four seasons with Collingwood before returning to Port Adelaide in 1987.

== Port Adelaide (1987–1993) ==
Phillips returned to Port Adelaide in 1987. The following year, he won the club's best and fairest. Phillips was captain of Port Adelaide from 1991 to the end of the 1993 season, when he announced his retirement. He was a member of eight Port Adelaide premiership sides: in 1977, 1979–1981, 1988–1990, and 1992.

== Honours ==
In 1980 Greg Phillips was named in the All Australian squad. In 2000 Phillips was selected as a centre half back in Port Adelaide's official 'Greatest Team 1870 to 2000'. In 2020, he was inducted into the Australian Football Hall of Fame.

== Personal life ==
Philips has three daughters with his wife Julie. His youngest daughter, Erin Phillips, was a member of the Australian basketball team, and began playing Australian rules with the Adelaide AFL Women's team in the inaugural 2017 season; she is a two time AFLW best and fairest winner. Erin subsequently moved to Port Adelaide when it joined the AFLW in 2022 (AFLW Season 7) as the team's inaugural captain.

Another daughter, Amy, is married to former AFL player Shaun Burgoyne. Phillips now coaches Virginia Football Club in the Adelaide Plains Football League, whom he has led to three consecutive grand finals.
