= Ben Harris (Australian rules footballer) =

Australian rules footballer

Personal information
- Full name: Benedict J. Harris
- Born: 27 June 1963 (age 63)
- Draft: 1986 pre-draft selection
- Height: 188 cm (6 ft 2 in)
- Weight: 94 kg (207 lb)

Playing career^{1}
Years	Club	Games (Goals)
1982–86, 1990–92	Port Adelaide (SANFL)	119 (21)
1987–1990	Brisbane Bears (VFL/AFL)	14 (6)
- ^{1} Playing statistics correct to the end of 1992.

Benedict J. Harris (born 27 June 1963) is a former Australian rules footballer who played with the Brisbane Bears in the Victorian/Australian Football League (VFL/AFL).

Originally from South Australian National Football League (SANFL) club Port Adelaide, Harris was one of six pre-draft selections which Brisbane had received in preparation for their inaugural VFL season in 1987. Harris made his senior VFL debut aged 23, and made ten appearances in his first year at the Bears.

In the next two and a half years he played only four more games and returned to Port Adelaide during the 1990 season. He was Port's fullback in the 1990 SANFL Grand Final, where they defeated Glenelg.
