= Mark Williams (Australian footballer, born 1958) =

Australian rules footballer (born 1958)

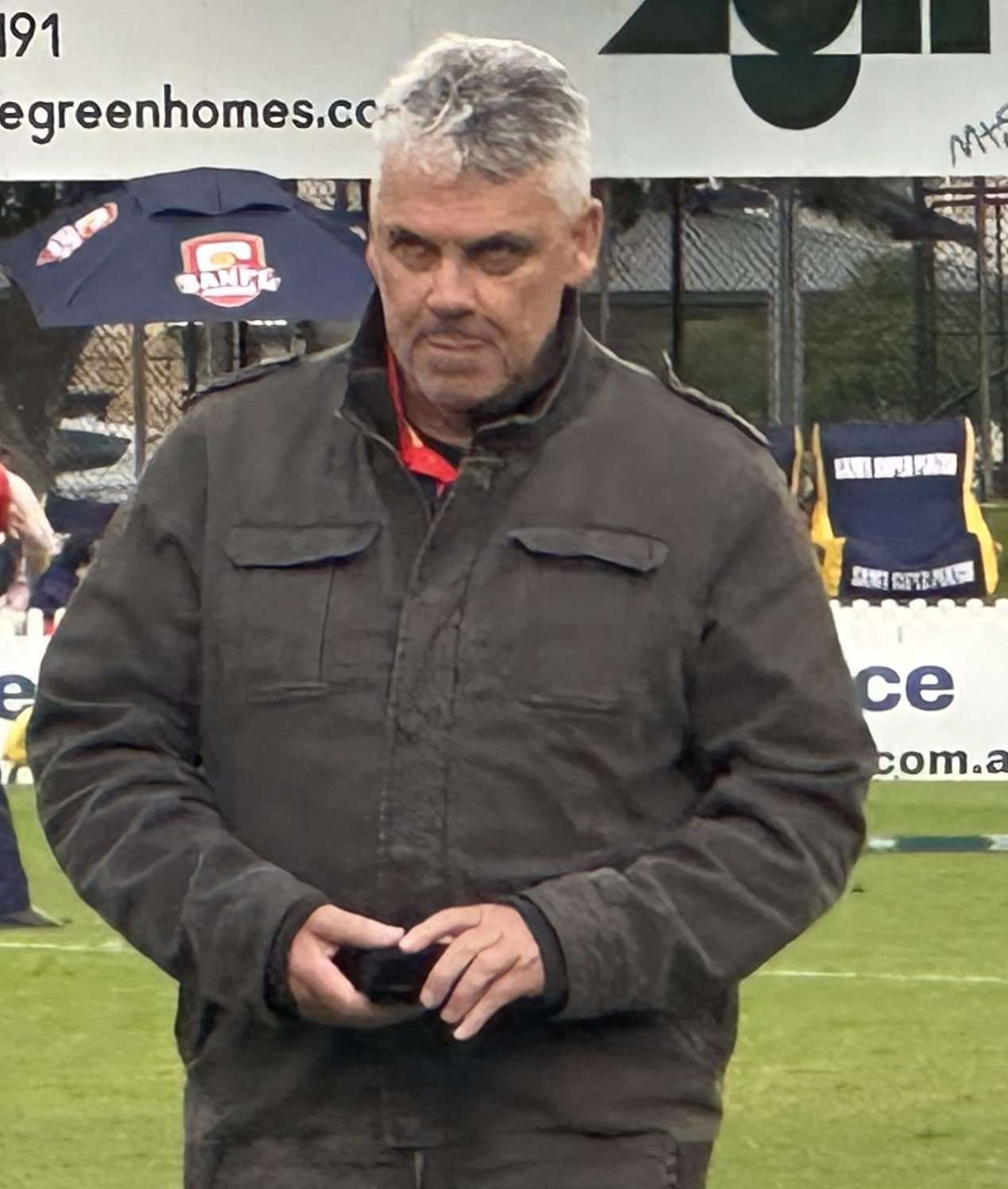
- Williams in 2026

Personal information
- Full name: Mark Melville Williams
- Nickname: Choco
- Born: 21 August 1958 (age 68)
- Original team: Port Adelaide (SANFL)
- Debut: Round 1, 28 March 1981, Collingwood vs. Fitzroy, at Junction Oval
- Height: 183 cm (6 ft 0 in)
- Weight: 80 kg (176 lb)
- Positions: Ruckrover, forward

Playing career^{1}
Years	Club	Games (Goals)
1976–78	West Adelaide	64 (37)
1979–80; 1990–92	Port Adelaide	115 (104)
1981–86	Collingwood	135 (178)
1987–90	Brisbane Bears	66 (58)
Total		380 (377)

Representative team honours^{2}
Years	Team	Games (Goals)
	South Australia	8
	Victoria	1

Coaching career^{3}
Years	Club	Games (W–L–D)
1993–1994	Glenelg	45 (22–22–1)
1999–2010	Port Adelaide	273 (150–121–2)
2008	Dream Team	1 (0–1–0)
2019–2020	Werribee	20 (12–8–0)
- ^{1} Playing statistics correct to the end of 1992.^{2} Representative statistics correct as of 2008.^{3} Coaching statistics correct as of 2020.

Career highlights
- Club: 4x Port Adelaide SANFL premiership player 1979, 1980, 1990, 1992; 2x Collingwood best and fairest: 1981, 1985; Collingwood leading goal kicker: 1984; Collingwood captain: 1983–1986; Representative: All-Australian team: 1980; Coaching: AFL premiership: 2004; All-Australian team: 2004; AFLCA Coach of the Year: 2004; AFLCA Development Coach of the Year: 2023; Honours: Port Adelaide Football Club Life Member: 2002; South Australian Football Hall of Fame: Inductee 2003; Neale Daniher Lifetime Achievement Award: 2016; Port Adelaide Hall of Fame: Inductee 2018; Australian Football Hall of Fame: Inductee 2023

Mark Melville Williams (born 21 August 1958) is a former Australian rules football player and coach. As a player, Williams represented West Adelaide and Port Adelaide in the South Australian National Football League (SANFL), as well as Collingwood and Brisbane Bears in the Australian Football League (AFL), from the 1970s to the 1990s.

One of several successful father-son combinations in Australian rules football, Williams became a successful coach after finishing his playing career, leading Port Adelaide to their first AFL premiership in 2004.

== Playing career ==
=== South Australian National Football League (SANFL) ===
==== West Adelaide ====
The son of South Australian football legend Fos Williams, Williams playing career began with West Adelaide in the South Australian National Football League (SANFL), where his father was serving as coach. He represented West Adelaide on 64 occasions for 37 goals.

==== Port Adelaide (SANFL) ====
Williams then moved to the Port Adelaide Football Club in the South Australian National Football League (SANFL), becoming one of the stars of the league, where he was part of the 1979 and 1980 Premiership sides.

=== Victorian Football League (VFL) / Australian Football League (AFL) ===
==== Collingwood Football Club (1981–1986) ====
After the 1980 season, Williams was recruited by Collingwood, making his Victorian Football League (VFL) debut in the 1981 season. Williams justified the hype over his recruitment by winning state selection for Victoria as well as the Copeland Trophy. He was named at centre for Collingwood in the 1981 Grand Final against Carlton. Collingwood lost, but Williams was recognised as being among the Magpies' better players on the day. When John Cahill took over as senior coach of Collingwood Football Club after a tumultuous season in 1982, he appointed Williams as captain, having previously worked with him at Port Adelaide. In 1984, Williams led Collingwood's goalkicking, kicking 53 goals for the season. However, he was unavailable for the Preliminary Final due to injury, and Collingwood went down to eventual premiers Essendon by 133 points. Williams remained captain of Collingwood until he left at the end of 1986 after a contract dispute.

==== Brisbane Bears (1987–1990) ====
Williams joined the Brisbane Bears, a new club who joined the Victorian Football League (VFL) league in 1987. He was appointed vice-captain to Mark Mickan at the new club. Williams played three and a half seasons from 1987 until 1990 to a total of 66 games for the Bears, before retiring from the Bears midway through the 1990 AFL season.

=== Return to the SANFL ===
Williams returned to Port Adelaide, and finished the 1990 season there, before playing a further two seasons. In his two stints at Port Adelaide, Williams played 115 games, kicking 104 goals, and won four premierships. He retired from playing at the end of 1992, with a total of 380 league games to his name. Williams was also part of the 1990 and 1992 Premiership sides.

== Coaching career ==
=== Glenelg Football Club (1993–1994) ===
Williams coached SANFL club Glenelg in 1993 and 1994.

=== Essendon Football Club (1995–1996) ===
Williams joined AFL club Essendon as an assistant coach under senior coach Kevin Sheedy for the 1995 season and 1996 season.

=== Port Adelaide Football Club (1997–2010) ===
In 1997, Williams joined Port Adelaide as an assistant coach in its inaugural season in the AFL, and in 1999, won the head coaching role as senior coach of Port Adelaide, replacing John Cahill.

Port Adelaide, under Williams in his first year as senior coach in the 1999 season, finished seventh on the ladder and making the finals, but were eliminated by the eventual premiers Kangaroos. In the 2000 season, Port Adelaide's on-field performance under Williams dropped en route to a fourteenth-place finish on the ladder with seven wins and fourteen losses. In the 2001 season, Williams guided Port to finish third on the ladder but were eliminated by Hawthorn in the semi-final. After this, Port Adelaide then won the minor premiership three seasons in a row under Williams' reign, firstly in 2002, Port under Williams were eliminated by the eventual premiers Brisbane Lions in the preliminary final, secondly in 2003, Port under Williams lost to eventual runners-up Collingwood in the preliminary final, and lastly in 2004, after failing to reach the Grand Final in either 2002 or 2003, the club under Williams went on to win its first AFL premiership in the 2004 AFL Grand Final against the Brisbane Lions by 40 points.

In 2005, Port Adelaide finished eighth with eleven wins, one draw and ten losses and therefore just made the finals. Port eliminated North Melbourne in the first elimination final in 2005, but were eliminated by Adelaide Crows in the 2005 semi final by 80 points. In 2006, Port missed the finals, when their on-field performance dropped, to finish twelfth with eight wins and fourteen losses. In 2007, Williams once again coached Port Adelaide to the grand final, but suffered the worst ever grand final defeat, losing to Geelong by 119 points.

In the 2008 season, Port Adelaide missed the finals, finishing thirteenth with seven wins and fifteen losses. Throughout 2009, Port Adelaide's inconsistent on-field performances continued to focus on Williams' future at the club. Late in the season, following the appointment of Mark Haysman as CEO, and after much conjecture in the media, Williams was offered a new 2-year contract. At the end of the 2009 season, Port Adelaide missed the finals for the second consecutive year, finishing tenth with nine wins and thirteen losses.

In the 2010 season, Port Adelaide were thirteenth after Round 14, with five wins and nine losses. As a result, Williams resigned as senior coach of Port Adelaide on 9 July 2010 and coached his final game, against Collingwood at AAMI Stadium in Round 15, 2010, losing to Collingwood by 26 points. Williams was replaced by assistant coach Matthew Primus as caretaker senior coach for the rest of the 2010 season, who was eventually employed as full-time senior coach.

=== Greater Western Sydney Giants (2011–2012) ===
In November 2010, Williams signed with the Greater Western Sydney Giants as the senior assistant coach under senior coach Kevin Sheedy. In September 2012, Williams informed the club after the last home and away game of the season that he would not be honoring the final season of his contract in 2013.

=== Richmond Football Club (2013–2016) ===
After the completion of the 2012 home and away season, Williams signed with the Richmond Football Club in an assistant coaching role as a development coach working with senior coach Damien Hardwick. In November 2014, Williams was diagnosed with lymphoma. Williams left the Richmond Football Club at the end of the 2016 season, after he was told that his contract would not be renewed due to a clean-out at the club.

=== AJAX Football Club (2017–2018) ===
In 2016, Williams joined Victorian Amateur Football Association (VAFA) club AJAX to serve as its senior men's coach, starting in 2017. He served as coach for a total of two seasons, departing at the end of 2018 after the club finished second-last in Premier B and was consequently relegated to Premier C.

=== Werribee Football Club (2019–2020) ===
In September 2018, Williams was announced as new senior coach of Victorian Football League club Werribee on a three-year deal. In his first season at the helm, Williams led Werribee to the VFL finals for the first time since 2015 and its first time as a standalone club in 20 years.

=== Melbourne Football Club (2020–2025) ===
In early December 2020, Williams was appointed the new head of development at Melbourne Football Club in an assistant coaching role, replacing the former head of development Matthew Egan and working with senior coach Simon Goodwin. Williams also played a key off-field role in the club's 2021 premiership victory by being part of the club's coaching panel. On 21 August 2025, it was announced Williams would depart the Melbourne Football Club at the end of the 2025 AFL season.

Hawthorn Football Club AFLW (2026-present)

In May 2026, Williams was appointed as the Hawthorn AFLW Head of Development.

== Footballing dynasty ==
Williams comes from a large and intensely proud footballing dynasty, closely aligned with Port Adelaide. His father, the late Fos Williams, is often referred to as the father of the Port Adelaide Football Club. His twin brother Anthony (died 1988) played at SANFL level, while younger brother Stephen played at both SANFL and AFL level and coached Port Adelaide to three SANFL premierships. His sister, Jenny, briefly served as a psychologist with the club. Mark is married to Pauline and they have three sons, PhD Candidate Isaac, Marcus, Louis and two daughters.

== Statistics ==
=== Playing statistics ===
Legend
G	Goals	K	Kicks	D	Disposals	T	Tackles
B	Behinds	H	Handballs	M	Marks

Season	Team	No.	Games	Totals							Averages (per game)						
Season	Team	No.	Games	G	B	K	H	D	M	T	G	B	K	H	D	M	T
1981	Collingwood	21	25	21	18	388	129	517	62	—N/a	0.8	0.7	15.5	5.2	20.7	2.5	—N/a
1982	Collingwood	21	22	22	14	340	130	470	91	—N/a	1.0	0.6	15.5	5.9	21.4	4.1	—N/a
1983	Collingwood	21	22	42	22	353	115	468	98	—N/a	1.9	1.0	16.0	5.2	21.3	4.5	—N/a
1984	Collingwood	21	23	53	31	257	113	370	77	—N/a	2.3	1.3	11.2	4.9	16.1	3.3	—N/a
1985	Collingwood	21	22	16	13	341	134	475	83	—N/a	0.7	0.6	15.5	6.1	21.6	3.8	—N/a
1986	Collingwood	21	21	24	20	269	139	408	95	—N/a	1.1	1.0	12.8	6.6	19.4	4.5	—N/a
1987	Brisbane Bears	2	19	27	16	263	133	396	72	46	1.4	0.8	13.8	7.0	20.8	3.8	2.4
1988	Brisbane Bears	2	14	5	16	218	90	308	50	30	0.4	1.1	15.6	6.4	22.0	3.6	2.1
1989	Brisbane Bears	2	22	19	18	310	151	461	84	56	0.9	0.8	14.1	6.9	21.0	3.8	2.5
1990	Brisbane Bears	2	11	7	11	135	72	207	26	26	0.6	1.0	12.3	6.5	18.8	2.4	2.4
Career			201	236	179	2874	1206	4080	738	158	1.2	0.9	14.3	6.0	20.3	3.7	2.4

=== Coaching statistics ===
Legend
W	Wins	L	Losses	D	Draws	W%	Winning percentage	LP	Ladder position	LT	League teams

Season	Team	Games	W	L	D	W %	LP	LT
1999	Port Adelaide	23	12	11	0	52.2%	7	16
2000	Port Adelaide	22	7	14	1	34.1%	14	16
2001	Port Adelaide	23	15	8	0	66.7%	3	16
2002	Port Adelaide	25	19	6	0	76.0%	1	16
2003	Port Adelaide	25	19	6	0	76.0%	1	16
2004	Port Adelaide	25	20	5	0	80.0%	1	16
2005	Port Adelaide	24	12	11	1	52.1%	8	16
2006	Port Adelaide	22	8	14	0	36.4%	12	16
2007	Port Adelaide	25	17	8	0	68.0%	2	16
2008	Port Adelaide	22	7	15	0	31.8%	13	16
2009	Port Adelaide	22	9	13	0	40.9%	10	16
2010	Port Adelaide	15	5	10	0	33.3%	10	16
Career totals		273	150	121	2	55.3%		

== See also ==
- 1990 SANFL Grand Final
