= David Marshall (Australian footballer) =

Australian rules footballer

Personal information
- Full name: David Marshall
- Born: 30 June 1960 (age 66)
- Original team: Plympton High
- Height: 177 cm (5 ft 10 in)
- Weight: 77 kg (170 lb)
- Position: Wingman

Playing career^{1}
Years	Club	Games (Goals)
1978–93	Glenelg	353 (290)
1991–92	Adelaide	26 (14)
- ^{1} Playing statistics correct to the end of 1993.

David Marshall (born 30 June 1960) is a former Australian rules footballer who played with the Glenelg Football Club in the South Australian National Football League (SANFL) and the Adelaide Football Club in the Australian Football League (AFL).

Marshall arrived at Glenelg from Plympton High School and made his league debut in 1978, playing primarily as a wingman. He was a half forward flanker in Glenelg's 1985 and 1986 premiership teams. In 1990, Marshall had his best season at Glenelg, taking out their 'Best and Fairest' award and finishing runner-up in the Magarey Medal. Glenelg lost the 1990 SANFL Grand Final to Port Adelaide by 15 points.

Adelaide signed him up as their oldest recruit for their inaugural AFL season in 1991 and he was one of their best performers in the midfield, averaging 24 disposals a game from his 15 appearances. He had a particularly strong debut in the club's inaugural game against Hawthorn at Football Park, with two goals and 29 disposals to earn two Brownlow votes as the Crows thumped the eventual season's premiers by 86 points. Marshall captained the South Australian interstate team against Western Australia in 1993.

He later served as a board member and selector at Adelaide and in 2003 was inducted into the South Australian Football Hall of Fame.
