= Allan Bartlett =

Australian rules footballer

Personal information
- Full name: Allan Bartlett
- Born: 23 May 1967 (age 59)
- Height: 188 cm (6 ft 2 in)
- Weight: 89 kg (196 lb)

Playing career^{1}
Years	Club	Games (Goals)
1989–1999	Glenelg	201 (92)
1991	Adelaide	11 (3)
- ^{1} Playing statistics correct to the end of 1991.

Allan Bartlett (born 23 May 1967) is a former professional Australian rules footballer who played for the Adelaide Football Club in the Australian Football League (AFL).

Bartlett was predominantly a defender but also spent some time up forward during his career, which began at Glenelg in 1989.

A member of Adelaide's first ever league squad, he played his first game for the club in round two of the 1991 AFL season. He made a total of 11 appearances that year and wouldn't add to that tally.

He continued playing with Glenelg and brought up his 200th SANFL game in the 1999 finals series. Glenelg were eliminated one game later and Bartlett would retire without participating in a premiership, although his came close in 1990 and 1992 when he played in grand finals.
