= Michael Murphy (Australian footballer) =

Australian rules footballer (born 1965)

Personal information
- Full name: Michael Murphy
- Born: 8 September 1965 (age 61)
- Original team: Glenelg (SANFL)
- Draft: No. 9, 1987 national draft
- Height: 188 cm (6 ft 2 in)
- Weight: 90 kg (198 lb)

Playing career^{1}
Years	Club	Games (Goals)
1988	North Melbourne	3 (0)
1991–1992	Adelaide	16 (41)
1993	Brisbane Bears	10 (22)
Total		29 (63)
- ^{1} Playing statistics correct to the end of 1993.

Michael Murphy (born 8 September 1965) is a former Australian rules footballer who played with the North Melbourne Football Club, Adelaide Football Club and the Brisbane Bears in the Victorian/Australian Football League (VFL/AFL).

Murphy, a key position player from Renmark, came to North Melbourne after being selected with the ninth pick of the 1987 VFL Draft. He played three times in the 1988 VFL season then returned to the club he was recruited from, Glenelg in the SANFL. Murphy was a centre half back in the 1990 Grand Final, which Glenelg lost to Port Adelaide. His performances during the year saw him make the Adelaide Football Club's squad for their entry into the AFL in 1991.

In just his second game, Murphy kicked a bag of six goals against Footscray at Football Park. He however struggled throughout the season with injuries and discipline, missing a total of seven games through suspension from three visits to the tribunal. In 1992 he again made few appearances, but managed an accurate 23 goals and three behinds.

Having been let go by Adelaide, he was picked up by Brisbane with the 81st pick of the 1992 AFL draft. His biggest contribution came in the club's record 219 to 57 points win over Sydney at the Gabba, where both he and Roger Merrett booted eight goals

According to afl.com Murphy was the most accurate scorer the game has seen amongst players with at least 50 scoring shots, with 76.83% of his shots at goal scoring a goal.
