= Richard Foster (Australian footballer) =

Australian rules footballer

Personal information
- Position: Backline

Playing career
Years	Club	Games (Goals)
1988–1995	Port Adelaide	145 (32)

Career highlights
- 4x Port Adelaide premiership player (1988, 1990, 1992, 1995)

Richard Foster was an Australian rules footballer for the Port Adelaide Football Club. In 2014 he began coaching the Freeling Football Club, departing the club midway through 2015.

Foster came to Port Adelaide via Carlton and went on to win 4 premierships in 1988, 1990, 1992 & 1995. Kicking a goal in both the 88 and 92 deciders.

The 1995 Grand Final would be his last game for the Magpies, having not played much league football that season, Foster found his way back into the team in the second semi final and retained his position in the team for the Grand Final.
