= Matthew Liptak =

Australian rules footballer

Personal information
- Full name: Matthew Liptak
- Born: 30 April 1970 (age 56)
- Original team: Glenelg
- Height: 178 cm (5 ft 10 in)
- Weight: 79 kg (174 lb)

Playing career^{1}
Years	Club	Games (Goals)
1991–1999	Adelaide	116 (128)

Representative team honours
Years	Team	Games (Goals)
1996	South Australia	1 (0)
- ^{1} Playing statistics correct to the end of 1999.

Career highlights
- Malcolm Blight Medal: 1996; Adelaide Team of the Decade – forward pocket

Matthew Liptak (born 30 April 1970) is a former professional Australian rules footballer who played for the Adelaide Football Club in the Australian Football League (AFL). He is also an orthopaedic surgeon, receiving his medical degree from Flinders University in Adelaide.

From Glenelg, Liptak was a determined inside midfielder with good goal kicking skills. Liptak's best season was 1996, in which he won the Best and Fairest and represented South Australia in State of Origin. This was while he was working 70 hours a week as an orthopaedic surgeon.
