= Scott Hodges =

Australian rules footballer (born 1968)

Personal information
- Born: 26 April 1968 (age 58); Adelaide, South Australia
- Original team: Salisbury West
- Debut: 1987, Port Adelaide vs. Sturt, at Football Park
- Height: 188 cm (6 ft 2 in)
- Weight: 92 kg (14 st 7 lb)

Playing career^{1}
Years	Club	Games (Goals)
1987–1998	Port Adelaide (SANFL)	167 (671) (Note: These totals refer to premiership matches (home and away and finals matches) only.)
1991–93, 1996	Adelaide (AFL)	38 (100)
Total		205 (771)

Representative team honours
Years	Team	Games (Goals)
	South Australia	3 (9)
- ^{1} Playing statistics correct to the end of 1998.

Career highlights
- Club: 8× Port Adelaide premiership player (1988-90, 1992, 1994, 1995-96, 1998); 5× Port Adelaide leading goalkicker (1988-90, 1994, 1996); SANFL Magarey Medalist 1990; 3× SANFL Ken Farmer Medalist (1990, 1994, 1996); SANFL Season Goalkicking Record Holder with 153 (1990); 2× Port Adelaide best and fairest 1990, 1996; Adelaide leading goalkicker 1992; Representative: 3 games for South Australia; Honours: Port Adelaide Life Membership 1997; Port Adelaide greatest team (Forward pocket); Port Adelaide Hall of Fame 2002; SANFL Hall of Fame 2007

Scott Lyall Hodges (born 26 April 1968) is a former professional Australian rules footballer who played for the Adelaide Football Club in the Australian Football League (AFL) and the Port Adelaide Football Club in the South Australian National Football League (SANFL). Hodges kicked 671 goals in his 167-game SANFL career and another 100 goals in 38 games with Adelaide.

Hodges also kicked nine goals in three games representing South Australia in State of Origin football, and 19 goals in 19 pre-season/night series matches for Adelaide and Port Adelaide.

Hodges is best remembered for his outstanding career as a full-forward with Port Adelaide in the SANFL between 1987 and 1998, the pinnacle of which came in 1990 when he kicked an SANFL single season record 153 goals, won the Magarey Medal as the league's fairest and best player, the Ken Farmer Medal for being the league's leading goal kicker, Port Adelaide's best and fairest award, and played in Port Adelaide's premiership team.

== Football ==
Hodges grew up as a Port Adelaide supporter and played his junior football at the Salisbury West Football Club.

=== Port Adelaide ===
Even though most Port Adelaide stalwarts of the era are highly decorated due to the stunning successes of the eighties and nineties, Hodges still manages to stand out. Along with his Magarey Medal, he won the Ken Farmer medal three times (1990, 1994, 1996), Port Adelaide's best and fairest twice (1990, 1996) and an eight-time Port Adelaide premiership player (1988–90, 1992, 1994–96, 1998).

Hodges retired from SANFL football in 1998, having played 167 games and kicked 671 goals in premiership matches since his debut in 1987. His 671 goals for Port Adelaide is second behind club legend Tim Evans who kicked 993 goals for the club between 1975 and 1986, while Hodges is also the sixth highest goal kicker in SANFL history. Overall, Hodges played 205 games and kicked 771 goals in elite Australian rules football.

In 1997 Hodges was rewarded for his service to the Port Adelaide Football Club with Life Membership before his legend status was assured with his election to Port Adelaide's Greatest Team in 2001 and the Port Hall of Fame in 2002.

Hodges was named in the Port Adelaide Football Club's inaugural AFL squad for their long-awaited entry into the AFL in 1997, but did not play a senior game due to a succession of injuries sustained throughout the year, sealing his AFL record at 38 games for 100 goals and limiting him to just seven games for Port Adelaide back in the SANFL.

=== Adelaide ===
At the age of 22 and with the football world seemingly at his feet his utter dominance was expected to continue into the Australian Football League, where Hodges joined the Adelaide Crows in their inaugural season in 1991, having been blocked from taking up lucrative offers from reigning AFL Premiers Collingwood and the Brisbane Bears.

Due to injury and inconsistency Hodges was unable to fully reproduce his best form at the elite level, although there were glimpses of his potential – such as his 11-goal haul against eventual Grand Finalists Geelong in 1992.

Despite that groundbreaking performance, finishing the season as Adelaide's leading goalkicker with 48 goals and boasting a highly respectable AFL career goal average of 3 per game to that point, in 1993 Hodges' position in the team was compromised by the emergence of glamour spearhead Tony Modra. With the much-vaunted pair misfiring in tandem, Modra's mammoth return of 129 goals guaranteed his status as Adelaide's number one full-forward and Hodges quit the Crows in frustration at the end of the season. Though many thought his AFL career was now finished, a highly successful SANFL sabbatical – despite missing the entire 1995 minor round with injury – saw him relisted by the Crows in 1996 but again Hodges found his opportunities limited, only managing a further two games for six goals.

== Honours ==
On 14 August 2007 Hodges was inducted into the SANFL Hall of Fame with fellow Port Adelaide and Crows team mate Bruce Abernethy as well as former Crows teammates Mark Bickley and Andrew Jarman among others.

== See also ==
- 1988 SANFL Grand Final
- 1989 SANFL Grand Final
- 1990 SANFL Grand Final
- 1992 SANFL Grand Final
- 1994 SANFL Grand Final
- 1995 SANFL Grand Final
- 1996 SANFL Grand Final
