= Bruce Abernethy =

Australian rules footballer (born 1962)

Personal information
- Full name: Bruce Richard Abernethy
- Nickname: ABBA
- Born: 10 May 1962 (age 64); Ouse, Tasmania
- Original team: Rosewater (SAAFL)
- Height: 185 cm (6 ft 1 in)
- Weight: 86 kg (190 lb)
- Positions: Wing, half-back flank

Playing career^{1}
| Years | Club | Games (Goals) |
| 1979–1981 & 1987-1992 | Port Adelaide | 190 (115) |
| 1982–1983 | North Melbourne | 43 (21) |
| 1984–1986 | Collingwood | 58 (16) |
| 1991–1992 | Adelaide | 11 (2) |
| Total | | 302 (154) |

Representative team honours
| Years | Team | Games (Goals) |
| | South Australia | 10 |

International team honours
| | Australia | 3 |
- ^{1} Playing statistics correct to the end of 1992.

Career highlights
- Club: 7x Port Adelaide premiership player (1979, 1980, 1981, 1988, 1989, 1990, 1992); Port Adelaide best and fairest (1987); Jack Oatey Medallist 1988; Honours: Port Adelaide Football Club player life member; South Australian Football Hall of Fame inductee 2007

Bruce Abernethy (born 10 May 1962) is a former professional Australian rules footballer who played for the North Melbourne Football Club Collingwood Football Club and Adelaide Football Club in the Victorian/Australian Football League (VFL/AFL), and the Port Adelaide Football Club in the South Australian National Football League (SANFL) and is a media personality.

== Football career ==
Nicknamed "ABBA", Abernethy was recruited from South Australian Amateur Football League (SAAFL) club Rosewater and debuted for Port Adelaide Football Club in the SANFL as a 16-year-old in 1978 and quickly made his mark as a running player of the highest calibre. Abernethy played in a premiership in each of his first full three years at senior level; 1979, 1980 and 1981.

Abernethy transferred to VFL club North Melbourne in 1982 and made his senior debut on 27 March 1982 against Richmond Football Club at the Melbourne Cricket Ground (MCG). Abernethy played 43 games in two seasons for North Melbourne before being traded to Collingwood in 1984 where he spent three seasons. After 58 games with Collingwood, and bringing up his 100th VFL game, Abernethy returned to Port Adelaide in 1987 instead of continuing on with a VFL career. His club Best and Fairest win in 1987 and his key role in his second trifecta of Port Adelaide premierships from 1988 to 1990, including a Jack Oatey Medal winning performance in the 1988 Grand Final, ensured that recruiting scouts continued to entice him to return to the VFL.

When the Adelaide Crows were formed in 1991, Abernethy was one of their first recruits. He finished his career with a seventh premiership with Port Adelaide in 1992. At the time, when contracted Crows players were not selected for the AFL team or they were out injured, they would play for the SANFL team they were either recruited from or had previously played for before joining the VFL/AFL. Abernethy played enough games for Port Adelaide throughout 1992 to be able to play for Port in the SANFL finals.

Health problems led to his early retirement after 190 games and 115 goals with Port Adelaide, 43 games and 21 goals with North Melbourne, 58 games and 16 goals with Collingwood and 11 games and two goals with Adelaide.

== Post-football career ==
After his football career, Abernethy became a boundary rider for the Seven Network's AFL coverage in Adelaide. Abernethy then became the main sports presenter at Channel Seven in the early 1990s and presents the sports report on Seven News on Mondays, Thursdays and Fridays, and on weekends to maximise his coverage of weekend AFL. Abernethy also acted as a presenter during Seven's coverage of the 2000 Summer Olympic Games in Sydney.

He was inducted into the South Australian Football Hall of Fame in 2007.
