= 1988 SANFL Grand Final =

1988 Australian rules football final

Port Adelaide	Glenelg
12.12 (84)	8.7 (55)
	1	2	3	4
PA	0.2 (2)	4.6 (30)	7.10 (52)	12.12 (84)
GLE	3.3 (21)	3.5 (23)	4.7 (31)	8.7 (55)
- Date: Saturday, 1 October (2:10 pm)
- Stadium: Football Park
- Attendance: 50,313

Accolades
- Jack Oatey Medallist: Bruce Abernethy

The 1988 SANFL Grand Final was an Australian rules football game contested between the Port Adelaide Football Club and the Glenelg Football Club, held at Football Park on 1 October 1988. It was the 87th annual Grand Final of the South Australian National Football League, staged to determined the premiers of the 1988 SANFL season. The match, attended by 50,313 spectators, was won by Port Adelaide by a margin of 29 points, marking that clubs twenty-eight premiership.
