= 1903 SAFA Grand Final =

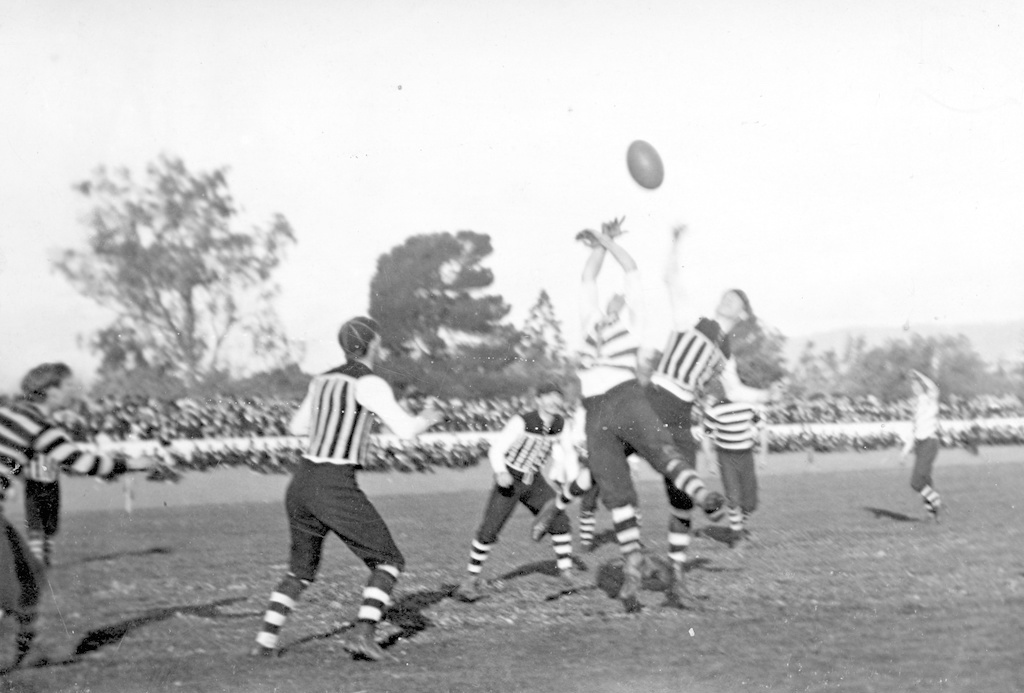

Port Adelaide	South Adelaide
6.6 (42)	5.5 (35)
	1	2	3	4
PTA	2.0 (12)	5.3 (33)	6.4 (40)	6.6 (42)
STH	2.2 (14)	2.3 (15)	4.4 (28)	5.5 (35)
- Date: Saturday, 12 September (2:10 pm)
- Stadium: Adelaide Oval
- Attendance: 14,000
- Umpires: G. Carris

The 1903 SAFA Grand Final was an Australian rules football game contested between Port Adelaide and the South Adelaide Football Club at the Adelaide Oval on 12 September 1903. It was the 8th instalment of the Grand Final of the South Australian Football Association, staged to determine the premiers for the 1903 SAFA season. The match, attended by 14,000 spectators, was won by Port Adelaide by a margin of 7 points, marking the club's first premiership in its Wharf Pylon guernsey and the club's fourth SAFA premiership victory overall.

== Teams ==
Port Adelaide
B:	Walter Butler	William Wisdom	Harold Ashby
HB:	Archibald Gosling	Archibald Hosie	Richard James
C:	Percy Whicker	Lewis Corston	Joseph Earle
HF:	Wagga Davis	Jack Mack	Edward Stawns
F:	Matthew Healy	James Tompkins	James Mathison
Foll:	John Davis	Robert Fraser	John Quinn
Coach:	Archibald Hosie		

South Adelaide
B:	C.Adcock	H.Cockburn	H.Forgie
HB:	J.Hansen	W.Huston	M.Herbert
C:	J.Kay	H.Kruss	P.Kelly
HF:	A.Morton	C.E.Nalty	F.O'Brien
F:	W. Paternoster	A. Ramsay	B. Rounsevell
Foll:	A. Swift	Jack Tredrea	J. Windsor
Coach:	Unknown		
