= Sydney Ween =

Australian rules footballer

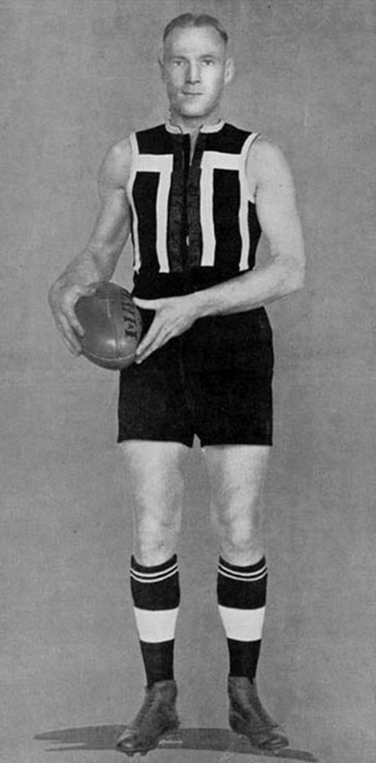

Personal information
- Full name: Sydney Frederick Ween
- Born: 4 October 1904; Upper Sturt, South Australia
- Died: 2 July 1974 (aged 69); Port Noarlunga, South Australia

Playing career
Years	Club	Games (Goals)
1924–1926	West Torrens	8 (6)
1927–1934	Port Adelaide	134 (49)
Total		142 (55)

Representative team honours
Years	Team	Games (Goals)
1930	South Australia	2

Career highlights
- Port Adelaide premiership player (1928); Port Adelaide captain (1932–1933); Port Adelaide vice-captain (1929–1931, 1934); Third place in 1931 Magarey Medal

Sydney Frederick Ween (4 October 1904 – 2 July 1974) was an Australian rules footballer who won a South Australian National Football League (SANFL) premiership in 1928 with the Port Adelaide Football Club.
