= Port Adelaide Football Club =

Australian rules football club

Names
- Full name: Port Adelaide Football Club Limited
- Nickname(s): AFL Power, Port; SANFL: Magpies; Indigenous rounds: Yartapuulti
- Motto: We Exist To Win Premierships
- Club song: AFL "Power to Win"; SANFL: "Cheer, Cheer the Black and the White"

2026 season
- Home-and-away season: AFL: 15th SANFL: 10th
- Leading goalkicker: AFL: Mitch Georgiades (51 goals); SANFL: Xavier Walsh (23 goals)
- John Cahill Medal: Jason Horne-Francis

Club details
- Founded: 12 May 1870; 156 years ago
- Colours: AFL Black White Silver Teal; SANFL: Black White
- Competition: AFL: Senior; SANFL: Reserves
- Chairperson: David Koch
- CEO: Matthew Richardson
- Coach: AFL: Josh Carr; SANFL: Heath Younie
- Captain(s): AFL: Connor Rozee; SANFL: Jez McLennan
- Premierships: AFL (1): 2004; Championship of Australia (4): 1890; 1910; 1913; 1914; SANFL (36): 1884; 1890; 1897; 1903; 1906; 1910; 1913; 1914; 1921; 1928; 1936; 1937; 1939; 1951; 1954; 1955; 1956; 1957; 1958; 1959; 1962; 1963; 1965; 1977; 1979; 1980; 1981; 1988; 1989; 1990; 1992; 1994; 1995; 1996; 1998; 1999; SA Patriotic League (2): 1916; 1917; SANFL merger league (1): 1942 (as Port-Torrens)
- Ground: AFL: Adelaide Oval (53,500); SANFL: Alberton Oval (11,000)
- Former ground: Glanville Hall Estate (1870–1879); Football Park (1974–2013)
- Training ground: Alberton Oval

Uniforms
Home	Clash	Heritage

Other information
- Official website: portadelaidefc.com.au

Port Adelaide Football Club is a professional Australian rules football club based in Alberton, South Australia. The club's senior men's team plays in the Australian Football League (AFL), where it is nicknamed the Power, while its reserves men's team competes in the South Australian National Football League (SANFL), where it is nicknamed the Magpies. Since its founding, the club has won an unequalled 36 SANFL premierships and four Championship of Australia titles, in addition to an AFL premiership in 2004.

Founded in 1870, Port Adelaide is the oldest professional football club in South Australia and the fifth-oldest club in the AFL. The club was a founding member of the South Australian Football Association (SAFA), later renamed the SANFL. Port Adelaide has repeatedly asserted itself as a dominant force within South Australian football, going undefeated in all competitions in 1914, and enjoying sustained periods of success under coaches Fos Williams and John Cahill, who share a combined 19 premierships between them. Since entering the AFL in 1997, the club has claimed four minor premierships and one premiership.

Port Adelaide holds a unique status among AFL clubs, being the only pre-existing non-Victorian club to have entered the AFL from another league. It has an intense rivalry with its intra-city opponents, the Adelaide Crows; the two compete in a twice-yearly fixture known as the 'Showdown'. It has historically enjoyed a long-standing rivalry with fellow SANFL club Norwood. The club has played at their SANFL home ground, Alberton Oval, since 1880 and has used their AFL home ground, Adelaide Oval, since 2014. Port Adelaide first adopted the colours black and white in 1902, with their 'Prison Bar' guernsey. Following its entry to the AFL, the club adopted the colours of teal and silver, in order to differentiate it from Collingwood.

== Club history ==
=== Early years (1870–1901) ===
Port Adelaide was formed on 12 May 1870 as a joint cricket and football club, originating as an offshoot of the pre-existing Port Adelaide Cricket Club. The first training session of the newly formed club took place two days later. The Port Adelaide Football Club played its first match against a newly established club from North Adelaide called the Young Australian.

13 May 1870 excerpt from the South Australian Register proclaiming the founding of the 'Port Adelaide Cricket and Football Club'.

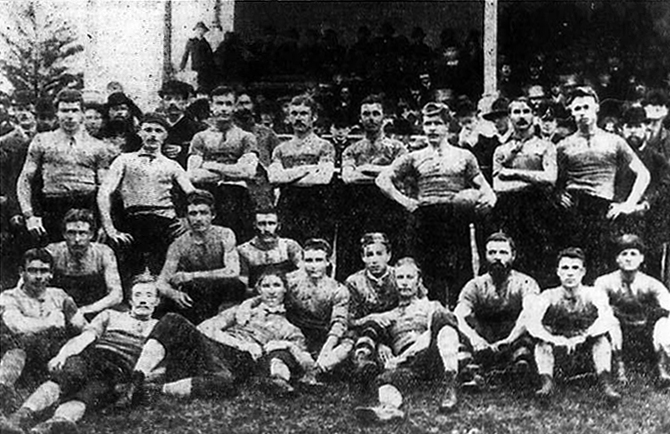
First premiership team in 1884

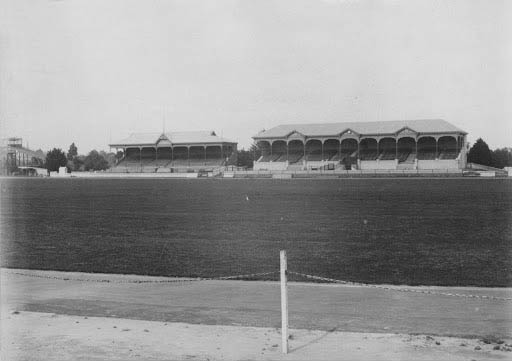
In 1889, Port Adelaide played Norwood in the first "Grand Final" at Adelaide Oval (pictured in 1889).

Prior to 1877, football in South Australia was yet to be formally organised by a single body, resulting in multiple set of rules being used across the state. In an effort to create a common set of rules, Port Adelaide was invited to join seven other clubs in the formation of the South Australian Football Association, the first ever governing body of Australian rules football.

In 1879, the club played reigning Victorian Football Association (VFA) premiers Geelong at Adelaide Oval in what was Port Adelaide's first recorded game against an interstate club. It played its first match outside of South Australia two years later, when it travelled to Victoria to contest a game against the Sale Football Club.

The club won its first premiership in 1884, when it ended a run of six consecutive premierships for Norwood. It later contested the SAFA's first grand final in 1889, as Port Adelaide and Norwood had finished the season with equal minor round records. Norwood went on to defeat Port Adelaide by two goals. Port Adelaide won its second SAFA premiership the following year, and went on to be crowned "Champions of Australia" for the first time after defeating VFA premiers South Melbourne.

1890 Championship of Australia	Score (Note: Behinds did not contribute to scoring until 1897.)
Port Adelaide	7
South Melbourne	6
Venue: Adelaide Oval	Crowd: 6,000

As the 1890s continued, Australia was affected by a severe depression that forced many players to move interstate to find work. This exodus translated into poor on-field results for the club. By 1896, the club had finished last on-field, with the season being described as "the worst in the record of football in South Australia" during a club meeting. The following year, Port Adelaide rebounded to win their third premiership, with significant credit for the achievement given to club secretary Henry Hills. Stan Malin won Port Adelaide's first Magarey Medal in 1899.

During the 19th century, the club had nicknames including the Cockledivers, the Seaside Men, the Seasiders and the Magentas. In 1900, Port finished bottom in the six-team competition, which it would not do again in any professional league until 2024.

=== 'Prison Bars' and the 'Invincibles' (1902–1915) ===
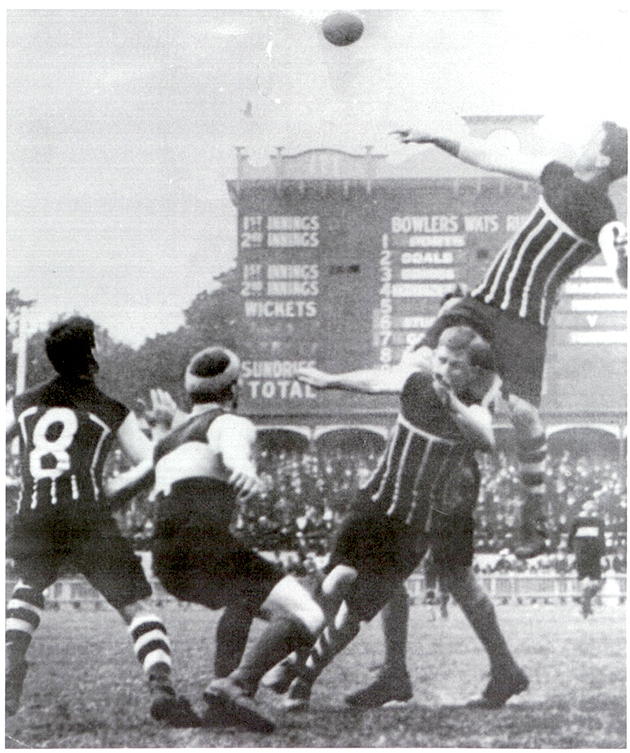
Harold Oliver taking a spectacular mark in the 1914 SAFL Semi-final against Sturt at Adelaide Oval

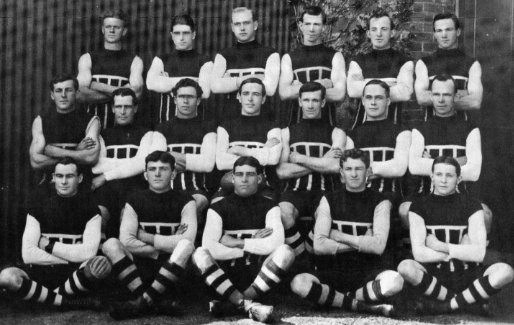
Port Adelaide's undefeated 1914 SAFL premiers and Champions of Australia team

Port Adelaide began wearing black and white guernseys in 1902 after experiencing consistent issues finding magenta dye that would last its blue and magenta guernseys. After finishing the 1902 season on top of the ladder, Port Adelaide was disqualified from the season after the club refused to contest their scheduled finals game against South Adelaide, with the club disputing the use of an unaccredited umpire. The 1902 SAFA premiership was subsequently awarded to North Adelaide after they defeated South Adelaide in the Grand Final a week later. Port Adelaide offered to play North Adelaide after the conclusion of the season, but the SAFA refused to allow it. Port Adelaide won the premiership the following year.

1914 Championship of Australia	G	B	Total
Port Adelaide	9	16	70
Carlton	5	6	36
Venue: Adelaide Oval	Crowd: 5,000

In the early 1910s, Port Adelaide became a consistent premiership contender, setting up the club to win three more Championships of Australia. Port Adelaide won the South Australian Football League (SAFL) premiership in 1910 defeating Sturt 8.12 (60) to 5.11 (41) in the Grand Final. The club would go on to defeat Collingwood for the 1910 Championship of Australia title, and defeated both Western Australian Football League (WAFL) premiers East Fremantle and a combined WAFL team in a pair of exhibition matches. Although Port Adelaide had success in the minor rounds the following two seasons, losing only a single game in 1911 and going undefeated in 1912, it was knocked out of contention by West Adelaide both times. The club won the SAFL premiership in 1913, losing only two games during the minor round and defeating North Adelaide in the Grand Final. They also defeated Fitzroy for the 1913 Championship of Australia.

Port Adelaide v South Australia	G	B	Total
South Australia	5	10	40
Port Adelaide	14	14	98
Venue: Jubilee Oval	Crowd: N/A

The 1914 Port Adelaide Football Club season is unique in SANFL history, being the only occasion in which a team has gone undefeated. The club won all twelve minor round SAFL games, the semi final against Sturt, and the 1914 SAFL Grand Final where it held North Adelaide to a single goal for the match 13.15 (93) to 1.8 (14). It also became the first to score over 1000 points during the minor round. The club met Victorian Football League (VFL) premiers Carlton in the Championship of Australia, defeating them by 34 points to claim a record fourth title. At the end of the 1914 season, a combined team from the six other SAFL clubs played Port Adelaide and lost to the subsequently-dubbed "Invincibles" by 58 points.

=== Two World Wars and the Great Depression (1916–1949) ===
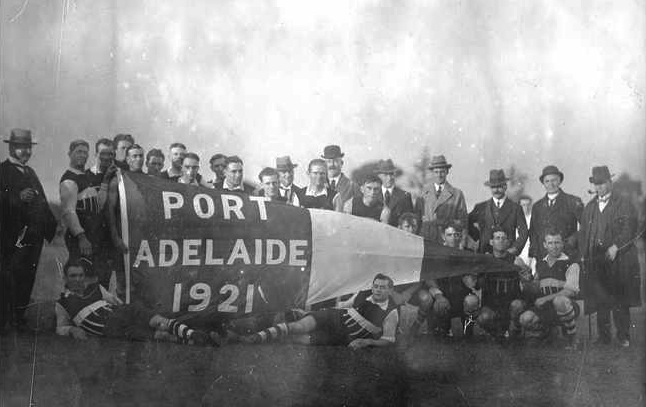
Port Adelaide players with the 1921 SAFL premiership flag pennant presented to them the following year at Adelaide Oval

Port Adelaide's early-century success was hindered by World War I. During the war, the club lost three players as casualties. A scaled-back competition referred to as the 'Patriotic League' was organised by the club during wartime in which Port Adelaide won the 1916 and 1917 instalments. Following the war, Port Adelaide struggled to replicate its past success. Despite winning the 1921 premiership under the captaincy of Harold Oliver, the club would go on to finish seventh in 1923, their worst competition finish since 1900. Between 1922 and 1935, the club would only win a single premiership.

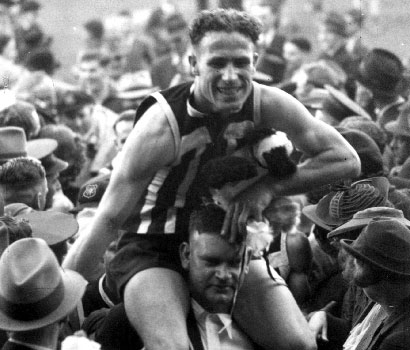
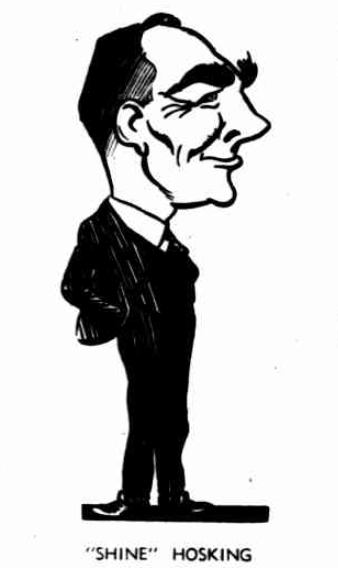
Left: Bob Quinn chaired off after winning the 1939 SANFL Grand Final. He would be selected in the Sporting Life magazine "All Australian" in 1947.
Right: Caricature of Port Adelaide coach Sampson 'Shine' Hosking by Lionel Coventry that appeared in The News on 20 April 1937

By the mid-1930s, Port Adelaide's form began to recover. It suffered two grand final losses in 1934 and 1935, before winning consecutive premierships the following two years. During 1939, Bob Quinn was appointed captain-coach and coached the team to a Grand Final win over West Torrens. Quinn resigned as captain-coach partway through the following season to enlist for military service, as would many Port Adelaide players during this time.

1939 SANFL Grand Final; Last Grand Final before War	G	B	Total
Port Adelaide	16	28	124
West Torrens	11	11	77
Venue: Adelaide Oval	Crowd: 43,885

Just as had happened in 1914, the league was hit hard by player losses in World War II; the club suffered six player casualties during the war. Due to a lack of able men, the league's eight teams were reduced to four and Port Adelaide temporarily merged with nearby West Torrens from 1942 to 1944. The joint club played in all three Grand Finals during this period, winning the 1942 instalment, but losing the 1943 and 1944 editions to the Norwood-North Adelaide combination. While normal competition resumed in 1945, Port Adelaide was unable to regain its pre-war success in the rest of the decade. In particular, it lost the 1945 SANFL Grand Final after a remarkable comeback from West Torrens. The 'All Australian', predecessor to the modern 'All-Australian' team, was created by Sporting Life magazine in 1947, with Bob Quinn being named in the side as captain.

=== Fos Williams era and Jack Oatey rivalry (1950–1973) ===
Fos Williams coached Port Adelaide to nine premierships.

During the 1950s, Port Adelaide re-established itself as a perennial contender, winning seven premierships. At the end of 1949, having missed two finals series in a row, the club's committee sought out a coach that could win the club its next premiership. Following a failed attempt to obtain Jim Deane, the decision was made to appoint Fos Williams, a rover from West Adelaide. In his second season as player-coach in 1951, Williams led the club to their first standalone premiership in 12 seasons, defeating North Adelaide by 11 points. In the 1951 post-season, Port Adelaide lost an exhibition match to reigning VFL premiers Geelong.

In the mid-1950s, Port Adelaide and Melbourne, often the premiers of South Australian and Victorian leagues respectively, played multiple exhibition matches at Norwood Oval in contests that were likened to the Championship of Australia. Keith Butler, a scribe for The Advertiser, described the 1955 match as "the fastest and most thrilling game seen under electric light". The match was decided in the last 15 seconds, when Frank Adams kicked a behind to give Melbourne a one-point victory.

Geof Motley took over the captain-coaching role at the club in 1959 when Williams retired from his playing career and also took a break from coaching. That year, the club won the premiership and equalled a national record of six consecutive Grand Final victories, having won each premiership from 1954 to 1959. Port Adelaide's premiership streak was brought to an end in the 1960 preliminary final with a 27-point loss to Norwood.

1965 SANFL Grand Final; Fos Williams's ninth premiership.	G	B	Total
Port Adelaide	12	8	80
Sturt	12	5	77
Venue: Adelaide Oval	Crowd: 62,543

Williams returned in 1962, and coached Port Adelaide to win three of the next four premierships. In 1965 he coached his ninth and last premiership in front of 62,543 people, the largest-ever sporting crowd at Adelaide Oval. After the 1965 Grand Final, Port Adelaide's success was limited by the dominance of Sturt, which won seven premierships over this period under the leadership of Jack Oatey. Despite playing in 6 of the next 10 grand finals, Port Adelaide failed to win another premiership in that span.

=== John Cahill, SANFL domination and AFL licence (1974–1996) ===
1977 SANFL Grand Final	G	B	Total
Port Adelaide	17	11	113
Glenelg	16	9	105
Venue: Football Park	Crowd: 56,717

One of Port Adelaide's leading players during the Fos Williams era was John Cahill. After retiring from playing in 1973 and following the departure of Fos Williams to West Adelaide, he took over as coach and began another era of premiership success for the club. In 1976, Cahill took Port Adelaide to its first Grand Final under his leadership, facing Sturt. Sturt won in front of an official attendance of 66,897, the record for football in South Australia. The actual crowd was estimated at 80,000, much bigger than the official figure. The following year, Port Adelaide won the premiership to break a 12-year drought.

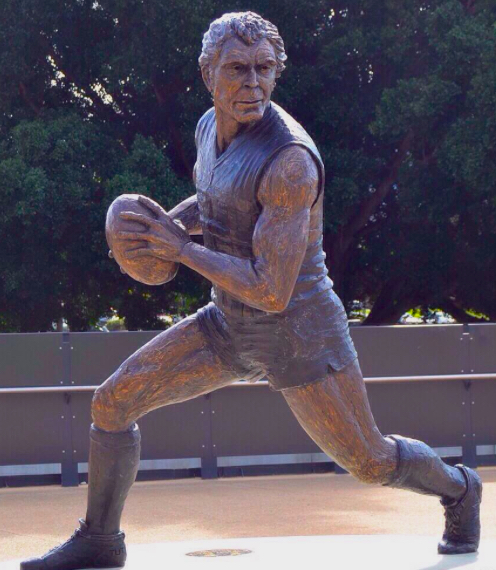
Statue of Russell Ebert outside Adelaide Oval, unveiled 15 August 2015

The 1980 season was Port Adelaide's most dominant since 1914. The club completed its fourth ever 'Triple Crown', winning the premiership, Magarey Medal and having the SANFL's leading goalkicker in a single season. The Magarey Medal was awarded to Russell Ebert for a record 4th time and Tim Evans set the then-league goal kicking record of 146 goals in a season. The club set a new record for most points scored during a season at 3,176, whilst also having conceding only 1,687 points. The club's win–loss record was 19–2 with one draw and a percentage of 165.31, its best percentage since 1914.

Following the 1982 season, Cahill was offered a contract by Collingwood to coach their club in the VFL. In his stead, Russell Ebert became coach in 1983. During his five years as coach, Port Adelaide made the finals three times, and achieved a win rate of above 55%. John Cahill returned as coach from the 1988 season, winning the premiership that year. He won a further five premierships, totalling a record-equalling ten over his coaching career.

Two key events of the late 1980s were attempts by the VFL to further expand outside of Victoria and financial difficulties in the SANFL. In 1989, seven of the ten SANFL clubs were recording losses and the combined income of the SANFL and WAFL had dropped to 40% of that of the VFL. During May 1990, the SANFL clubs unanimously accepted a SANFL proposal to not enter a club from South Australia until 1993. Weeks later, Port Adelaide, suffering from a mixture of ambition and frustration, started secret negotiations with the newly renamed Australian Football League in the town of Quorn for entry to the competition in 1991. When knowledge of Port Adelaide's negotiations to gain an AFL licence were made public, the other nine SANFL clubs called a crisis meeting to discuss options. Plans were made to kick Port Adelaide out of the SANFL should they succeed, and to prevent them from using Football Park as a home ground. SANFL clubs urged Justice Olssen to make an injunction against the bid, which he agreed to. During these meetings, an option was discussed to make a counter offer to the AFL. On 16 August, the SANFL officially launched a submission for a composite team. The AFL subsequently accepted the SANFL's bid to enter the composite team, which was named the Adelaide Football Club.

"These twenty blokes, everyone whose helped us, are sensational people and all the views that you have read in the press the one thing that really matters is that there will always be a Port Adelaide Football Club."

— George Fiacchi upon accepting the 1990 Jack Oatey Medal for best on ground at the 1990 SANFL Grand Final

During December 1994, Max Basher announced that Port Adelaide had won the tender for the second South Australian AFL licence, with the condition that a merger needed to take place between two existing AFL clubs to keep the league at the club limit imposed by the AFL in 1993. As such, the licence would not be made available until at least 1996, and was not guaranteed. With a merger of the Brisbane Bears and Fitzroy looming, the club was advised on 21 May 1996 by the AFL that they would take part in the 1997 AFL season.

=== AFL entry, Mark Williams and club debt (1997–2010) ===
1997 West End Showdown I	G	B	Total
Adelaide Crows	11	6	72
Port Adelaide	11	17	83
Venue: Football Park	Crowd: 47,265

Following confirmation of their entry in 1997, the club began preparations to enter the league. John Cahill began the transition to the AFL, with Stephen Williams, a son of Fos Williams, taking over the SANFL coaching position from midway through the 1996 season. As part of the inaugural squad, a total of twelve players were signed from other AFL clubs, including 1993 Brownlow Medallist and inaugural captain Gavin Wanganeen. On 29 March 1997, Port Adelaide played its first AFL premiership match against Collingwood at the Melbourne Cricket Ground (MCG). It won its first AFL game in round 3 against Geelong, and defeated cross-town rivals and eventual premiers Adelaide by 11 points in the first Showdown in round 4. The club finished its first season 9th, missing the finals on percentage behind Brisbane. Following the 1998 season, John Cahill retired from his coaching position.

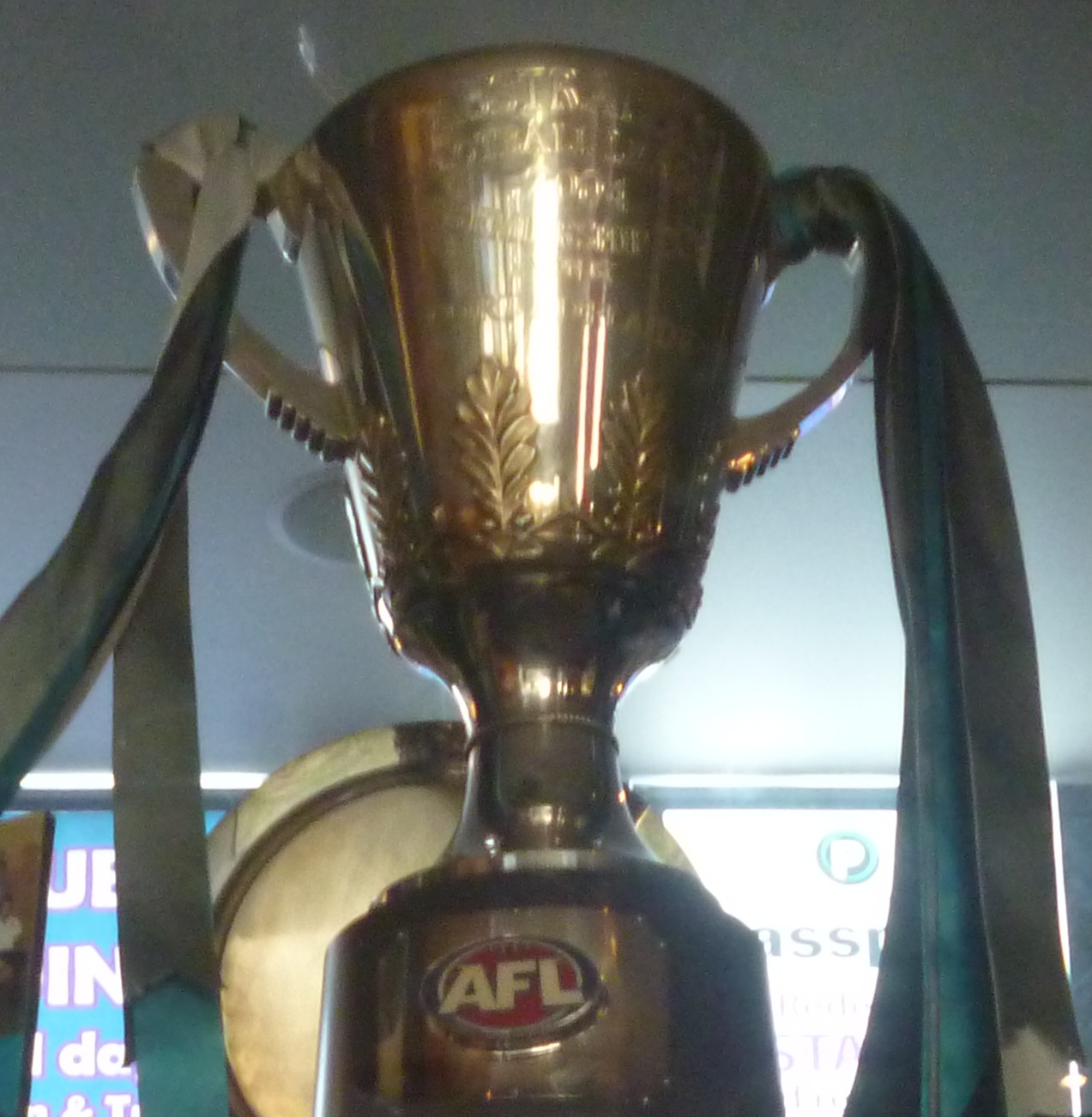
The 2004 AFL premiership was Port Adelaide's first since joining the AFL.

2004 AFL Grand Final	G	B	Total
Port Adelaide	17	11	113
Brisbane Lions	10	13	73
Venue: Melbourne Cricket Ground	Crowd: 77,671

In 1999, Mark Williams, another son of Fos Williams, took over as coach of Port Adelaide and led the club to many notable first achievements in the AFL over the next decade. The club earned a spot in the AFL finals for the first time in Williams' first season, and would go on to finish in the top four after the home-and-away season four consecutive times between 2001 and 2004, including three consecutive minor premierships. However, repeated eliminations from finals during this period eventually led to certain elements of the press calling Port Adelaide "chokers", as well as trucking magnate Allan Scott in early 2004—who was the founder and owner of Scott's Transport, Port Adelaide's major sponsor—publicly calling for Williams' dismissal.

The 2004 season saw Port Adelaide achieve national success. Between Round 12 and the end of the home-and-away season, the club would only lose a single game - claiming their third consecutive minor premiership. Port Adelaide defeated both Geelong and St Kilda in finals, earning their first Grand Final berth against the Brisbane Lions, who were attempting to win a record-equalling fourth straight AFL premiership. A strong final quarter saw Port Adelaide win its first premiership by 40 points: 17.11 (113) to 10.13 (73). Byron Pickett was awarded with the Norm Smith Medal for being judged the best player in the match. An exuberant Williams took to the field after the siren and ripped off his tie in a mock choking gesture, later exclaiming during his acceptance speech: "Allan Scott, you were wrong!"

"Port Adelaide are the winningest team in Australia. The ol' Port Adelaide have won 36 premierships, today, at the MCG, may just be their finest hour."

— Tim Lane's statement at the conclusion of the 2004 AFL Grand Final

Following 2004, Port Adelaide would see limited success for the remainder of the decade. The club made the finals for a fifth consecutive season in 2005, where they contested the only Showdown final to date. In 2007, the club qualified for the grand final following a strong home-and-away season, where they were defeated by Geelong by an AFL record margin of 119 points, 24.19 (163) to 6.8 (44).

Following their second grand final, Port Adelaide began experiencing financial troubles. By 2009, the club had accumulated a consolidated debt totalling $5.1 million and was unable to pay its players; they had lost $1.6 million the season before. The AFL delayed giving the club financial support, instead urging it to sort out deals with SANFL as a predecessor to any league support. On 20 May, Port were handed $2.5 million in debt relief by the SANFL, and on 15 June were handed a $1 million grant by the AFL commission. Plans for a re-merging of the two teams was rejected by the SANFL early during 2010, though they eventually signed off on the proposal during November 2010.

"He (Demetriou) said he could not imagine an AFL competition without Port Adelaide in it. I thought that was a really strong statement of leadership."

— Keith Thomas at a press conference upon the retirement of Andrew Demetriou

The 2010 season saw Mark Williams step down as senior coach.

=== Independence and Ken Hinkley (2011–present) ===
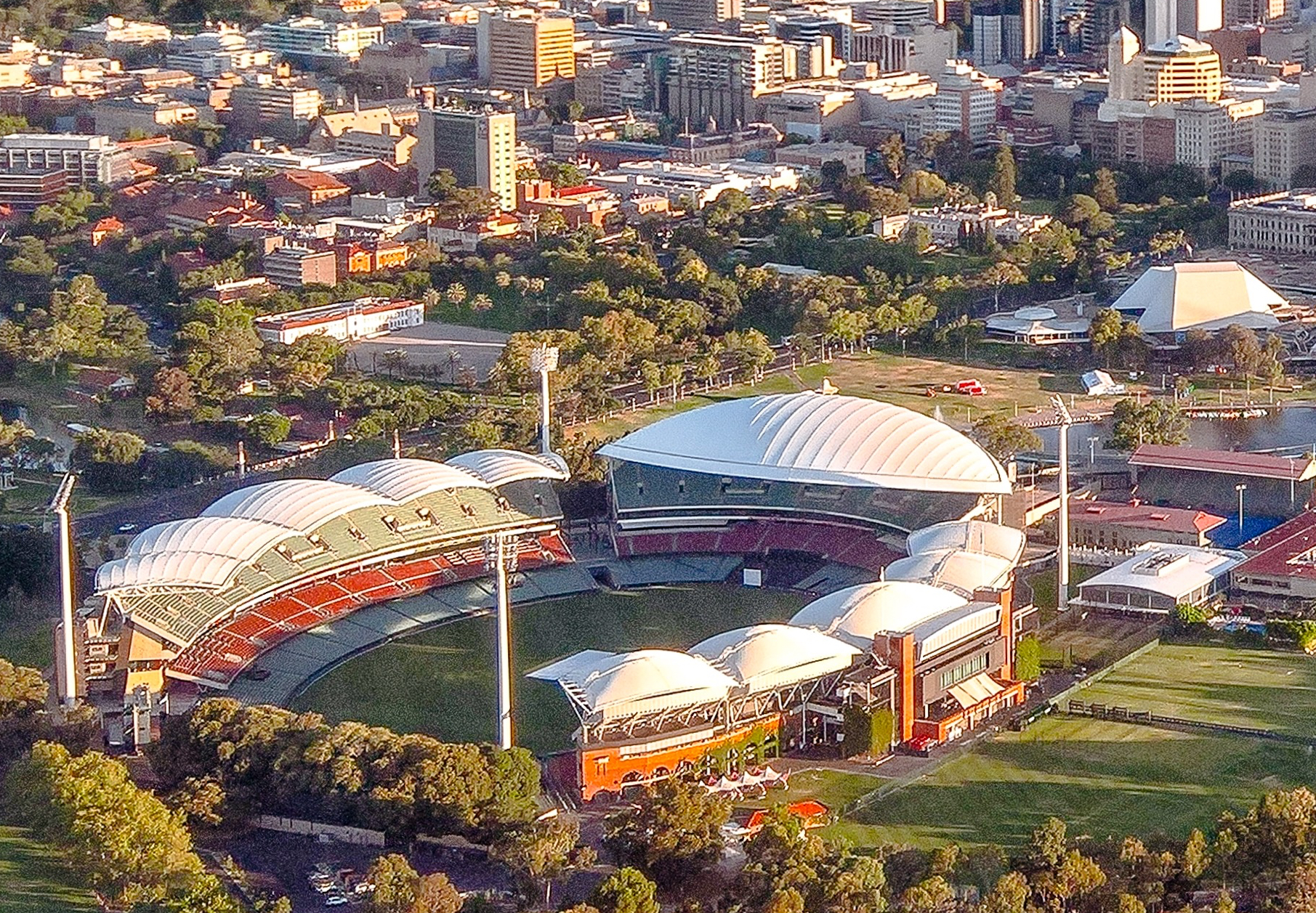
In 2014, Port Adelaide returned to Adelaide Oval as its home ground for the first time since the 1976 SANFL season.

On 9 September 2010, Matthew Primus was appointed as the senior coach of the club for the next three years, following a stint as caretaker coach where he won five of seven games coached.

2011 saw the club's financial crisis come to a head. Due to the lack of financial reserves, the SANFL was unable to get a line of credit to cover Port Adelaide's future debts, prompting talks of a potential takeover. To bail out the club, AFL Chief executive Andrew Demetriou offered $9 million over the next three years, ahead of a planned move to the Adelaide Oval. On-field, Port Adelaide finished sixteenth for the 2011 season with 3 wins, suffering record losses to Collingwood and Hawthorn in Round 20 and 21. The following season, Matthew Primus stepped down from his position as coach, following a loss to Greater Western Sydney.

On 8 October 2012, Ken Hinkley was announced as the new senior coach of the club. During the same week, David Koch was named chairman of the club and numerous board members were replaced. The club finished the home and away season 7th on the ladder, qualifying for finals for the first time since 2007. Port won against Collingwood in an elimination final; they were defeated by Geelong the following week in a semi final.

As the club entered the 2014 season, both Port Adelaide and Adelaide moved their home games from Football Park to the redeveloped Adelaide Oval. Amidst the change, Port Adelaide's license was transferred from the SANFL to the club for a sum of approximately $7 million, giving the club independent control of its operations for the first time in its history. Port Adelaide finished fifth on the ladder, with a win–loss record of 14–8. The club's season ended with a three-point loss to Hawthorn in the preliminary finals.

Chart of yearly ladder positions for Port Adelaide in the AFL

The club saw another sustained period of strong home-and-away season results between 2020 and 2024. The club finished in the top four four times, including a fourth minor premiership in 2020, and a club-high 13 game winning streak in 2023. The club would also see Ollie Wines become the first Port Adelaide player to win the Brownlow Medal in 2021, winning the award with a record-equalling tally of votes.

Despite strong home-and-away performances, the club was unable to qualify for the grand final during this period - suffering three preliminary final defeats, and a straight sets exit in 2023.

In February 2025, the club announced that Hinkley's tenure as senior coach would conclude at the end of the 2025 season, and that assistant coach Josh Carr would take over the position in 2026.

=== AFLW involvement ===
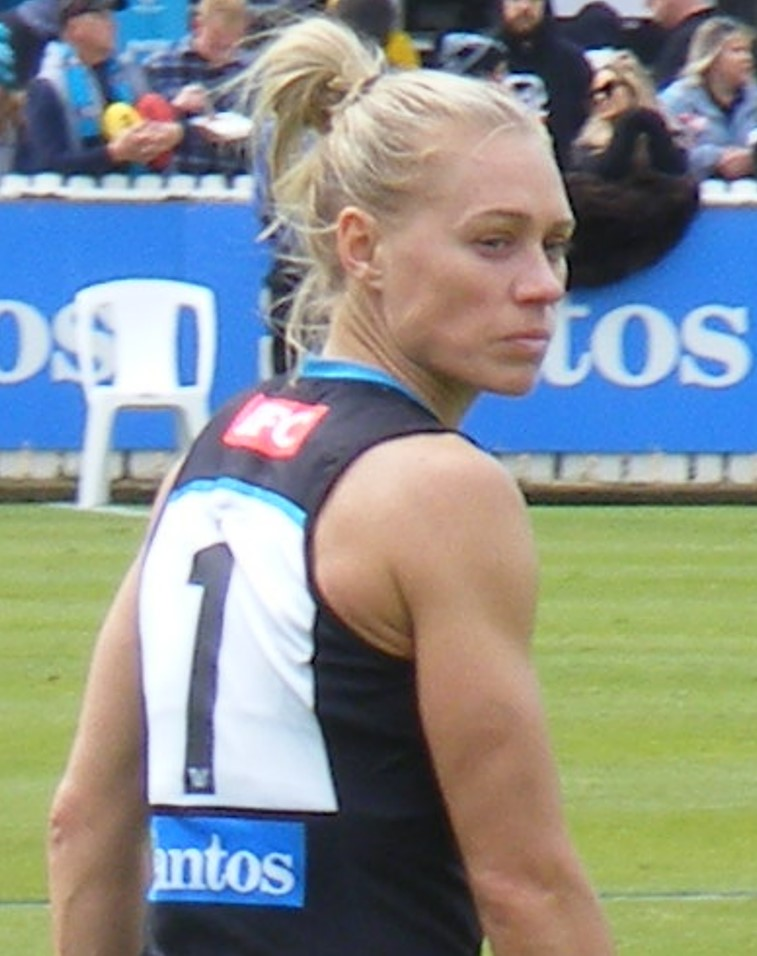
Erin Phillips was awarded the captaincy of Port Adelaide's Women's team for its inaugural season in 2022 AFL Women's season 7.

Prior to the creation of the AFL Women's (AFLW), Port Adelaide undertook a big grassroots push to improve women's football in South Australia. The club made a host of announcements in early 2016 related to increasing participation in women's football. These included a commitment to the formation of a women's academy and an official partnership with the Port Adelaide Women's Football Club, a local club competing in the South Australian Women's Football League.

Due to logistical demands related to the club's China program, the club was unable to submit a bid for the 2017 AFLW season. The club subsequently attempted to enter a side in the SANFL Women's League, but this approach was rejected by the South Australian Football Commission.

In May 2021, the AFL Commission announced that the remaining four clubs without AFLW teams would be admitted to the competition by the end of 2023, with the clubs to bid for entry order. Port Adelaide's bid to enter the competition was successful, with the AFL Commission deciding all four clubs would debut in the AFLW in 2022 season 7.

=== SANFL presence (post–AFL entry) ===
As part of Port Adelaide's initial bid for the 1994 AFL licence, the club was initially required to forgo any presence in the SANFL. After winning the tender for the licence, however, the SANFL requested that Port Adelaide field two teams in the SANFL and AFL, with the stipulation that both were completely separate to avoid granting any unfair advantage. For the first few years after their formation, the Port Adelaide Magpies were forced to train in Ethelton, instead of using the upgraded Alberton Oval training facilities. Additionally, Port Adelaide AFL-listed players were randomly drafted to other SANFL clubs to play matches when not selected for the senior team. Australian football historian John Devaney described the forced separation of Port Adelaide's SANFL and AFL operations as being "akin to the enforced splitting up of families associated with military conquest or warfare".

In response to financial trouble suffered by both Port Adelaide entities, the "One Port Adelaide Football Club" movement was launched by former players Tim Ginever and George Fiacchi on 20 August 2010, in an effort to merge Port Adelaide's AFL and SANFL operations. A website was created that claimed 50,000 signatures were needed for the merger. On 16 November 2010, following approval from all nine SANFL clubs, the club formalised the off-field merger between the two entities. On 10 September 2013, Port Adelaide and the SANFL agreed to a model to allow all its AFL-listed players (not selected to play for Port Adelaide in the AFL) to play for the SANFL side. As part of the arrangement, the club lost its recruiting zones and could no longer field sides in the junior SANFL competitions, and the club would establish an 18–22-year-old academy team to compete in the league's reserves competition. In 2018, Port Adelaide and the league jointly agreed that it would no longer field a team in the SANFL Reserves competition.

Port Adelaide initially still had success in the SANFL after accession into the AFL, with the Port Adelaide Magpies winning back-to-back Grand Finals in 1998 and 1999. However, the club would not make another grand final until the 2014 season, where it was defeated by Norwood by four points. Port Adelaide featured in two further grand finals against Sturt and Glenelg, though it would be defeated in both.

The club did not field a team in the SANFL in the 2020 season due to AFL restrictions imposed during the COVID-19 pandemic, though it re-joined the competition in 2021. In December 2023, the Herald Sun reported that the club had applied for entry into the VFL, with the intention to transition the club's reserves team into a potential national reserves competition. Though the club negotiated rule changes with the SANFL in 2024 to ensure the club retained a presence in the SANFL, in August 2026 CEO Matthew Richardson and chairman David Koch reiterated the club's intention to leave the SANFL at the conclusion of its contract, with the pair citing issues with player development as the primary motivation for the move.

== Club symbols and identity ==
=== Club guernseys ===
==== Captain and No. 1 guernsey ====
The tradition dictating that the captain of the Port Adelaide Football Club wear the number one guernsey started when Clifford Keal wore the number as club captain for the first time in 1924. The tradition was cemented, at least in the view of then-secretary Charles Hayter, when in 1929 he received a letter from a junior Kilkenny player requesting a number one Port Adelaide guernsey as he had just become captain of his underage team. Hayter granted the wish of the junior and provided him with a number one Port Adelaide guernsey. Since 1924, there have been few exceptions to the tradition. The most notable exception was Geof Motley, who followed the captaincy of Fos Williams. Following his appointment as captain-coach, Motley elected to continue wearing the number 17, and continued to do so for the remainder of his career. At the insistence of coach Fos Williams, the tradition resumed in 1967 under the captaincy of John Cahill. When co-captains were appointed for the 2019 season the No. 1 guernsey was temporarily retired. It was re-instated the following season when the club returned to appointing a single captain.

==== Number panel ====
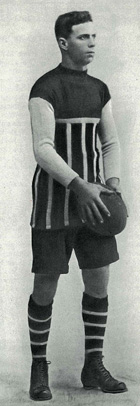
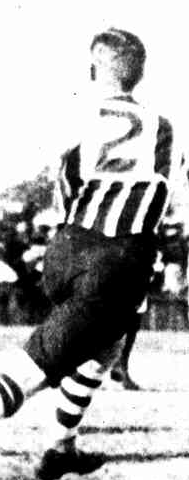
Left: Harold Oliver wearing Port Adelaide's Wharf Pylon guernsey
Right: Clifford Cocks wearing the first Port Adelaide guernsey with the number panel attached to the back for a trip to Western Australia in 1910

The white number panel on the back of the Port Adelaide guernsey originates from the first decade of the twentieth century when club secretary James Hodge took the club across Australia to play matches against interstate teams. During the early 1900s, it was commonplace that touring teams would wear numbers, allowing spectators to identify unknown footballers. Between 1910 and 1914, the club alternated between featuring a design with a white square and black numbers, and a design featuring a black square and white numbers. The club introduced a 'permanent' white panel for the 1928 season, which would remain until the club merged with West Torrens during WWII. The club reintroduced the panel in 1952 and has since continuously used it in the SANFL. The panel was also present on the club's AFL guernsey until it was phased out in 2009. The number panel returned to the club's guernsey in 2017. The white panel is also intended to resemble the white back of a local magpie species that is present on the badge of South Australia.

==== 'Prison Bar' guernsey ====
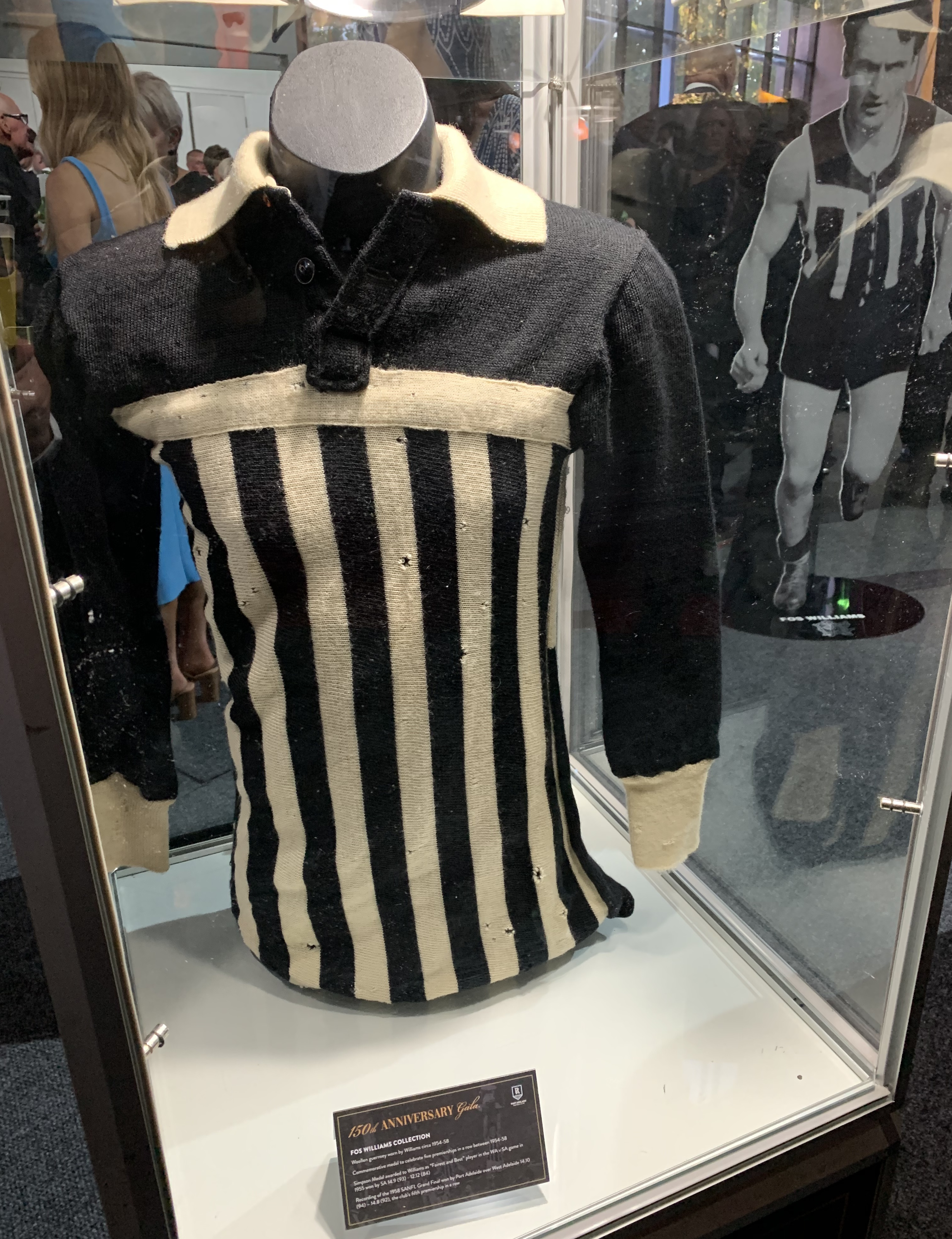
Woollen Fos Williams' Port Adelaide guernsey from the mid-to-late 1950s

Historically, the black-and-white 'Prison Bar' guernsey, alternatively known as the 'Wharf Pylon' guernsey, has been Port Adelaide's most recognisable guernsey design. The club first adopted the guernsey in the 1902 season, after having difficulty finding magenta and blue dyes that could repeatedly last the rigours of an Australian rules football match. The guernsey was designed to be a literal depiction of the wharves and pylons that were prominent along the docks of Port Adelaide at the turn of the 20th century. The guernsey has since been worn for all SANFL premierships, with the exception of 1951.

"Anyone that put on the guernsey acted like the guernsey intended it to act. It wasn't built around the player wearing the guernsey. It was the guernsey using a player."

— Retired Port Adelaide player and coach Fos Williams explaining the mythology of the guernsey in 1981

The Prison Bar nickname first originated from fans of rival football clubs, in particular those of Norwood. The nickname was used in a derogatory fashion, in an attempt to liken the club to a criminal stereotype. The nickname first appeared in media in early 1993, in a match report written by former cricketer Alan Shiell. The nickname was subsequently accepted by the Port Adelaide fanbase, becoming a popular nickname for the design among many fans.

Upon joining the AFL, Port Adelaide, along with being required to find a new logo and nickname, was also required to replace the Prison Bar guernsey because existing club Collingwood wore a similar guernsey with vertical black and white stripes. A new guernsey was ultimately created, incorporating teal into its design.

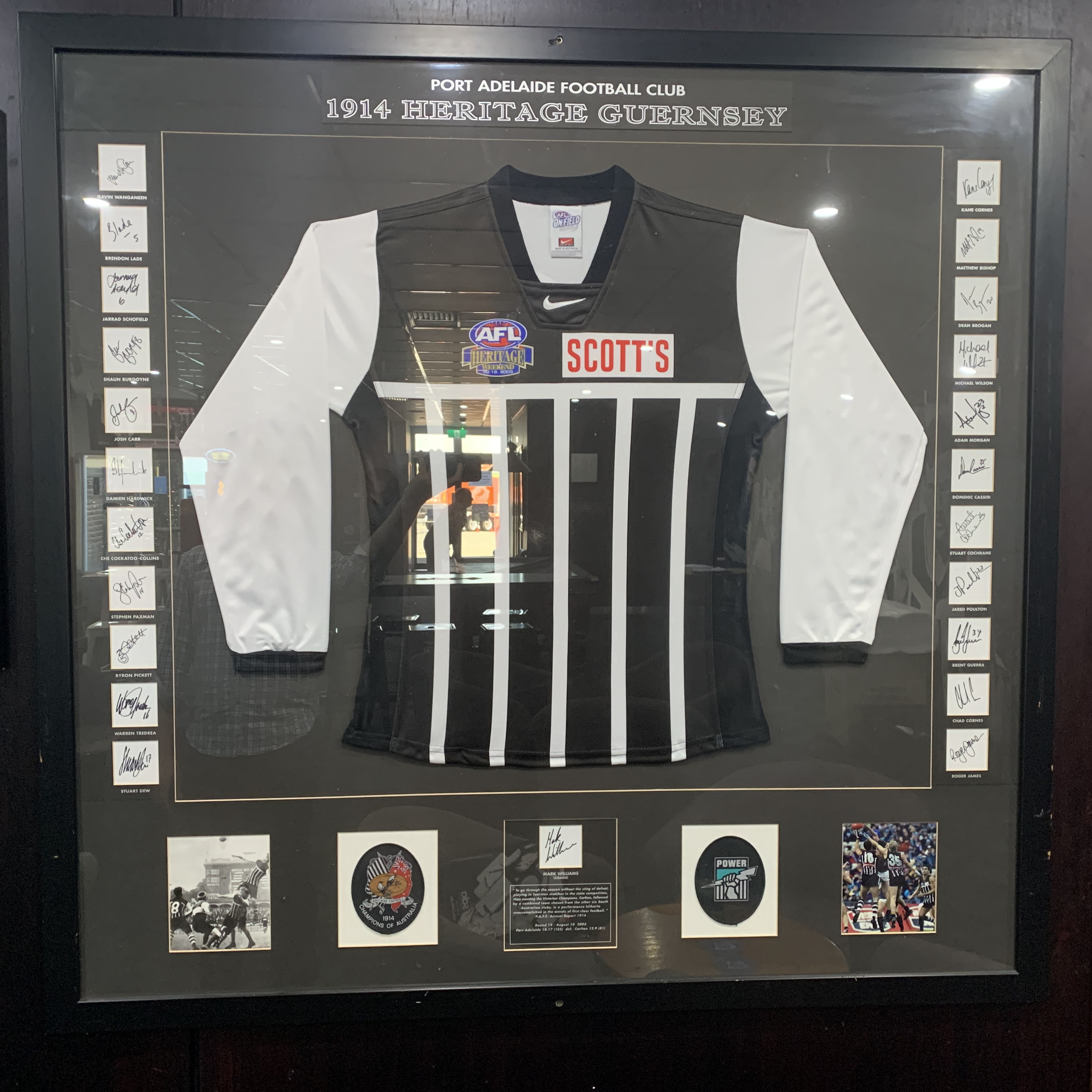
Port Adelaide's 2003 AFL Heritage Round guernsey

Since the club's entry to the AFL, Port Adelaide has made various requests to wear the Prison Bar guernsey in specific games. The club was first granted the right to wear an AFL-approved Prison Bar guernsey in the Heritage Round of the 2003 season. During 2007, following controversy the year prior in which the AFL declined Port Adelaide the right to wear their heritage guernsey, Port Adelaide, Collingwood and the AFL struck an agreement allowing Port Adelaide to wear the guernsey in any future home heritage round games, provided that such a game was not against Collingwood. In August 2019, the club was granted permission to wear the guernsey in its two Showdown matches for the 2020 season as part of its 150th anniversary celebrations; the club wore the guernsey in the sole Showdown that year, following revisions to the 2020 fixture due to the COVID-19 pandemic.

In early 2023, the club negotiated an agreement with Collingwood to return the guernsey for that season's home showdown match; the agreement was subsequently extended to include all future men's and women's home showdowns.

Support for the guernsey remains extremely high, with the merchandise for a single game against Carlton in 2013 generating over $500,000. On 9 September 2020, it was revealed that memorabilia associated with the Prison Bar guernsey raised $2,000,000 for the club in 2020, and the Prison Bar guernsey itself was the highest-selling piece of merchandise in the AFL that year.

==== Uniform evolution ====
Uniform evolution
Design	Period	Description	History	Statistics
	1870–1876	A white base featuring light blue hoops.	Inaugural guernsey used by the club. Used during the 2005 AFL Heritage Round.	Seasons: 7 – Premierships: 0
	1877–1883	Full pink uniform.	Worn upon the club's entry to the SAFA.	Seasons: 9 – Premierships: 0
	1884–1892	Blue bib added to the top of uniform. Better dyes resulted in pink being changed to magenta.	Worn for the club's first premiership in 1884.	Seasons: 9 – Premierships: 2 (1884, 1890)
	1893–1901	Magenta uniform with blue stripes and leather lace divider.	Replaced after 1901 due to dissatisfaction with the magenta dye used. Used during the 2004 Heritage Round.	Seasons: 9 – Premierships: 1 (1897)
	1902–1922; 1928–1940; 1954–present	Black uniform with vertical white stripes from the base to the chest and a horizontal white bar across the chest.	Worn for all South Australian premierships since 1902 except for 1951. Used once in each of the 2003, 2007, 2013, 2014, 2020 AFL seasons, and in every home showdown since the 2023 AFL season.	Seasons: 107 – Premierships: 34 (1903, 1906, 1910, 1913, 1914, 1916*, 1917*, 1921, 1928, 1936, 1937, 1939, 1954, 1955, 1956, 1957, 1958, 1959, 1962, 1963, 1965, 1977, 1979, 1980, 1981, 1988, 1989, 1990, 1992, 1994, 1995, 1996, 1998, 1999)
	1923–1927; 1941–1953	A uniform with black-and-white vertical stripes.	The 1951 uniform was given to the club by Collingwood, in celebration of the Jubilee year of Australia.	Seasons: 18 – Premierships: 1 (1951)
	1997–2009	A black uniform, featuring a teal upper base with black and white partial strips protruding from one side.	Inaugural uniform in the AFL. Port Adelaide was required to incorporate teal and remove vertical stripes by the AFL to appease Collingwood.	Seasons: 13 – Premierships: 1 (2004)
	2010–present	A black uniform featuring teal and white chevrons.	Permanently used in the AFL since 2010.	Seasons: 17 – Premierships: 0

=== Logo evolution ===
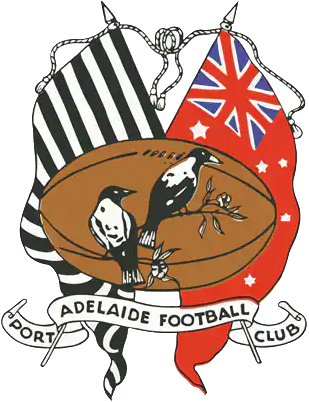
The first Port Adelaide logo, introduced in the early 1900s

Port Adelaide's two joint logos for the club's AFL and SANFL teams, in use until 2019

Port Adelaide has adopted different insignia on several occasions throughout its history.

Up until 2020, all of the club's insignia in the SANFL were designed around featuring one or multiple magpies. The original club crest, adopted in 1900, featured a tan football and magpies perched on a gum tree with a black and white striped flag on the left and the Australian Red Ensign on the right. The ensign switched to blue sporadically through the 1910s before the flags were dropped in 1928. Between 1930 and 2019, the logo always featured a dexter (left-facing) magpie. The magpie was depicted perched upon a gum branch from 1930 until 1953, and on a fence wire from 1954 until 1974. The last SANFL-specific logo, used by the club between 1975 and 2019 in the SANFL, was situated inside a circular disc. It made mention of "Magpies" in the logo for the first time and was the longest standing in the club's history.

Upon entering the AFL in 1997, Port were required to adopt colours and an insignia that distinguished it from Collingwood, who already had the nickname of the 'Magpies'. The club designed a new logo featuring a silver fist clutching a lightning bolt in front of both a Prison Bar design and teal background, with the club's then-nickname "Port Power" featured above the design. The logo was slightly altered in 2001 with the lightning bolt and fist defined and the reference to "Port" dropped. Ahead of the 2020 season, Port Adelaide's 150th anniversary, the club unveiled a commemorative logo to be worn by both the senior AFL team and reserves SANFL team. The logo features the "PA" acronym, 1870 to acknowledge the foundation year, the black-and-white prison bars, the chevron design of the AFL guernsey and a teal outline. Although initially intended to be used exclusively in 2020, feedback from supporters, key stakeholders and investors prompted the club to retain the logo in 2021 and beyond.

=== Club songs ===
Over the years, Port Adelaide has used various songs and music at its games. The club has had two main official songs in the SANFL and one in the AFL, in addition to other songs representing the club unofficially. In its first season during 1870 the club invited local brass bands to play during the club's first games at Glanville. In 1882 a song based on Harry Clifton's "Work, Boys, Work, and Be Contented!" was written for the club as a tribute to the recently retired player Thomas Smith. The club also historically used another song titled "The pride of Port Adelaide is our football team". In 1971, Port Adelaide secretary Bob McLean decided to adopt the club song "Cheer, Cheer the Black and the White" after hearing the South Melbourne Football Club's song based on the Notre Dame Fighting Irish football team's "Victory March". "Cheer, Cheer the Black and the White" is still used by the club in the SANFL competition.

As part of their entry to the AFL, Port Adelaide chose to adopt a new club song. The chosen song, "Power to Win", was written for the club by Quentin Eyers and Les Kaczmarek. The song was first played at AFL level after Port Adelaide's win against Geelong in Round 3, 1997 at Football Park. As the club's official nickname was shortened to 'The Power', rather than the original 'Port Power', the song was later re-recorded with references to 'Port Power' removed. Since 2016, an alternative Pitjantjatjara language version of the song ('Nganana wanangara kanyini' – literally, 'We have the lightning bolt') has been used by the club during certain occasions, such as Sir Doug Nicholls Round.

Since March 2014, Port Adelaide has used "Never Tear Us Apart" by the Australian band INXS as the club's unofficial anthem leading up to the opening bounce. The song is used as a reference to the various and unique difficulties the club faced when trying to enter the AFL, primarily in regards to the separation of its SANFL and AFL operations. Port Adelaide's use of the song stems from a trip the club took to Anfield in November 2012. The song was adopted to replicate the pre-match anthem used by Liverpool F.C, which was highly praised by the Port Adelaide playing group. Initially, the song was introduced to coincide with the 60-second countdown before the start of a match, with the music playing over the top of a video montage. The song proved to be a success among the fans, with them adopting the song as well as raising scarves above their heads as the song was being sung.

=== Home grounds ===
==== Glanville Hall Estate/Buck's Flat (1870–1879) ====
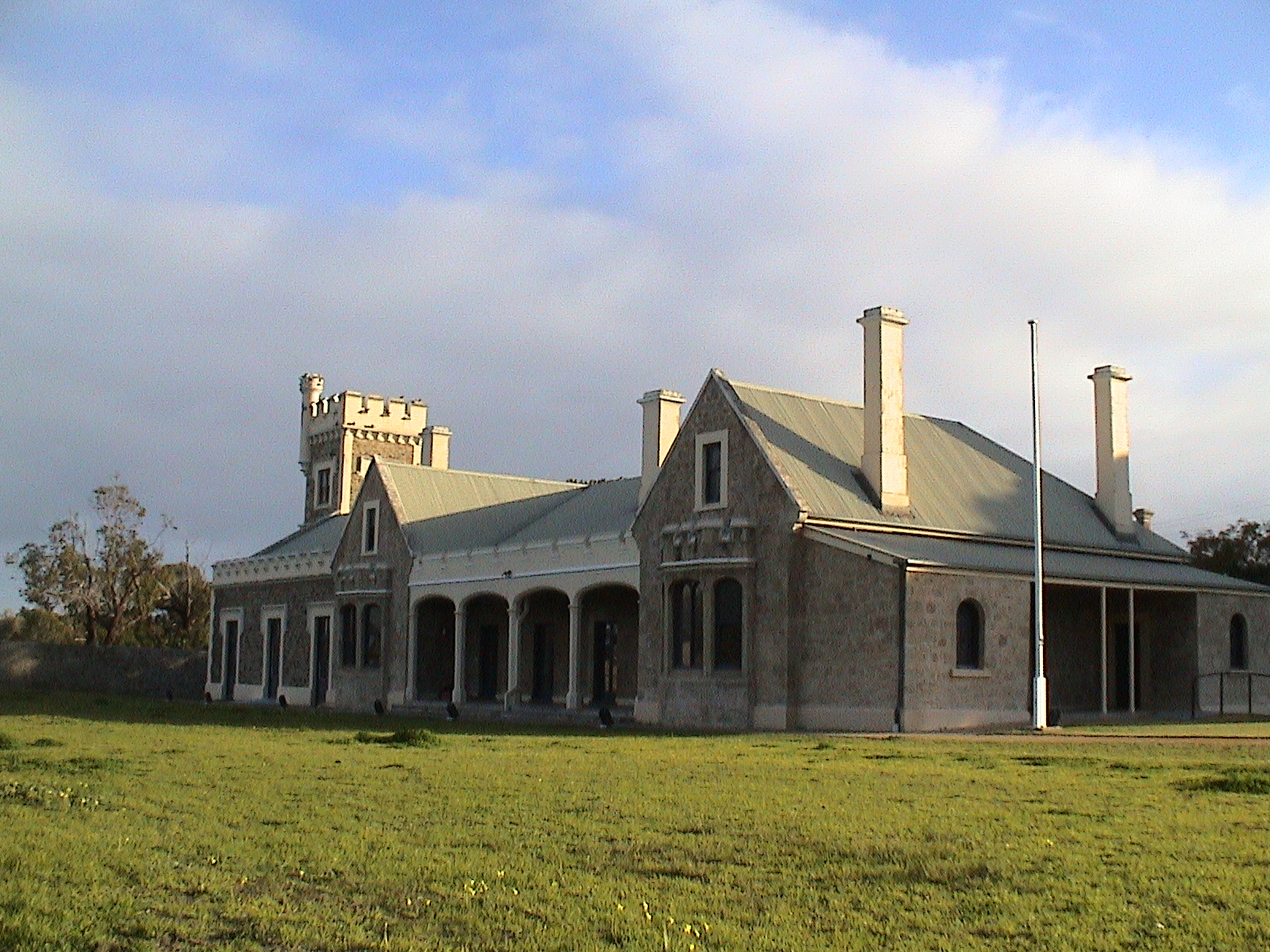
Glanville Hall Estate

After foundation, it was decided by the inaugural president of Port Adelaide, John Hart Jr., that the club's home ground would be Glanville Hall Estate, a property owned by his immediate family. The area in which the teams played was often referred to as 'Buck's Flat'. The club ceased using the ground following 1879, as the property was sold at an auction.

==== Alberton Oval (1880–present) ====
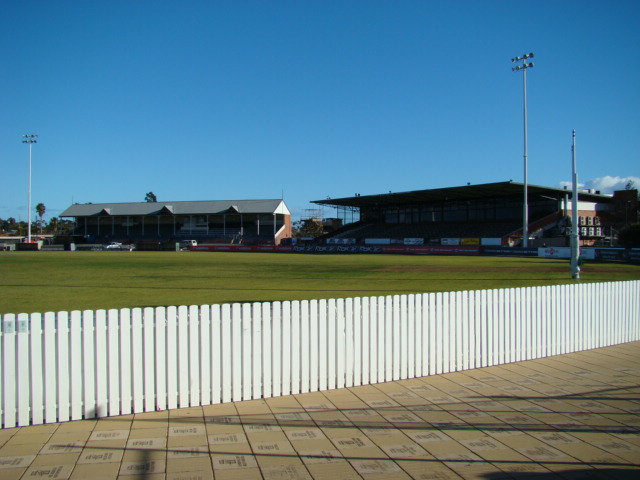
Alberton Oval

Alberton Oval has been Port Adelaide's home ground in the SANFL since 1880, excluding 1975 and 1976. Following the end of its operations at Glanville Hall, Port Adelaide was forced to find a new ground to operate from. It was decided that the club would use Alberton Oval for the 1880 season. On 15 May 1880, Port Adelaide played its first match at Alberton Oval. The following year, the decision was made by the club to start leasing the oval from the Port Adelaide Council for the sum of 10 shillings a year. The oval is also used for training purposes for both AFL and SANFL operations, excluding a period between 1997 and 2001 when SANFL training temporarily moved to Ethelton.

In 1975 and 1976, Port Adelaide was temporarily locked out of the ground following a dispute between the Port Adelaide Council, the SANFL and the club over seating arrangements at the ground. During this time period, the SANFL and clubs split seat allocation 50/50 at all suburban grounds. However, the Port Adelaide Council demanded control of half of Alberton's seats on game day, leaving the remaining half to be split between the SANFL and the club. In 1975, the SANFL refused to accept the offer for the ground provided by the council, resulting in the temporary suspension of Port Adelaide's lease on the ground. This prevented Port Adelaide from playing any games at the venue and, the following year, training at the venue. With the 1977 season pending, the issues between the council and the club were resolved and the club was permitted to return that year.

The ground possesses two grandstands named after individuals important to the club. The Fos Williams Family Stand is the oldest remaining grandstand at Alberton Oval, first constructed in 1903. The other grandstand, the Robert B. Quinn MM Grandstand, was first opened in 1972. The ground also has the bordering Allan Scott Power Headquarters for the administration of Port Adelaide, which opened in 1999 and is named after the club's initial major sponsor.

==== Football Park (1997–2013) ====
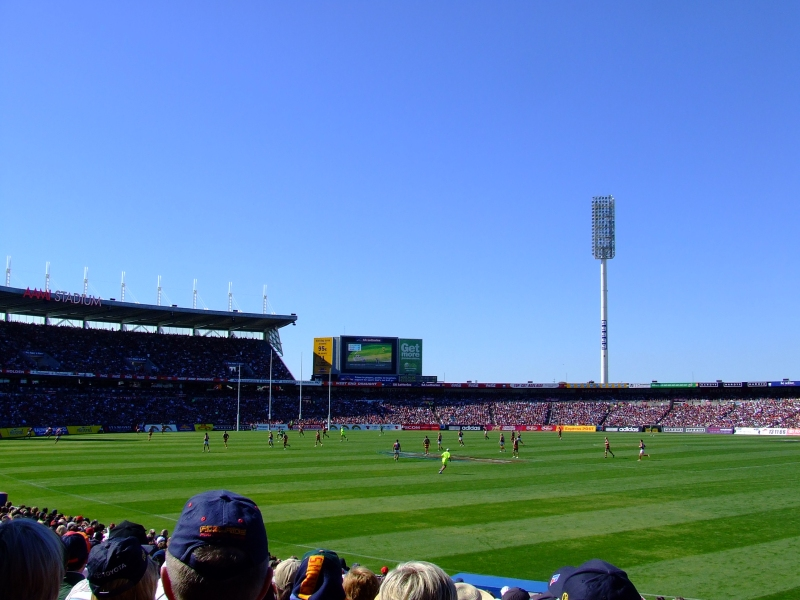
Football Park

Port Adelaide first played at Football Park on 15 June 1974. It was the primary host SANFL finals from 1974 until its demolition in 2013, and also hosted night matches for the league following the construction of light towers in 1984. During 1975 and 1976, Port Adelaide sold some of their home games (to be played at their temporary home, Adelaide Oval) to Football Park.

Upon the club's entry to the AFL, fellow South Australian club Adelaide was already using the ground for their home matches. Port Adelaide was assigned the ground as its home venue, alongside its existing tenants. Port Adelaide's first official AFL match at the ground was on 6 April 1997, where they were defeated by Essendon by 33 points.

Planned upgrades to the stadium were cancelled following news that Port Adelaide, alongside both Adelaide and the SANFL, would make use of Adelaide Oval from 2014 onward, as it had been recently redeveloped. It hosted its final AFL match on 31 August that year, where Port Adelaide was defeated by a point by Carlton. The ground has remained in use by Adelaide and the SANFL, though features such as the ground's grandstands have been demolished.

==== Adelaide Oval (2014–present) ====
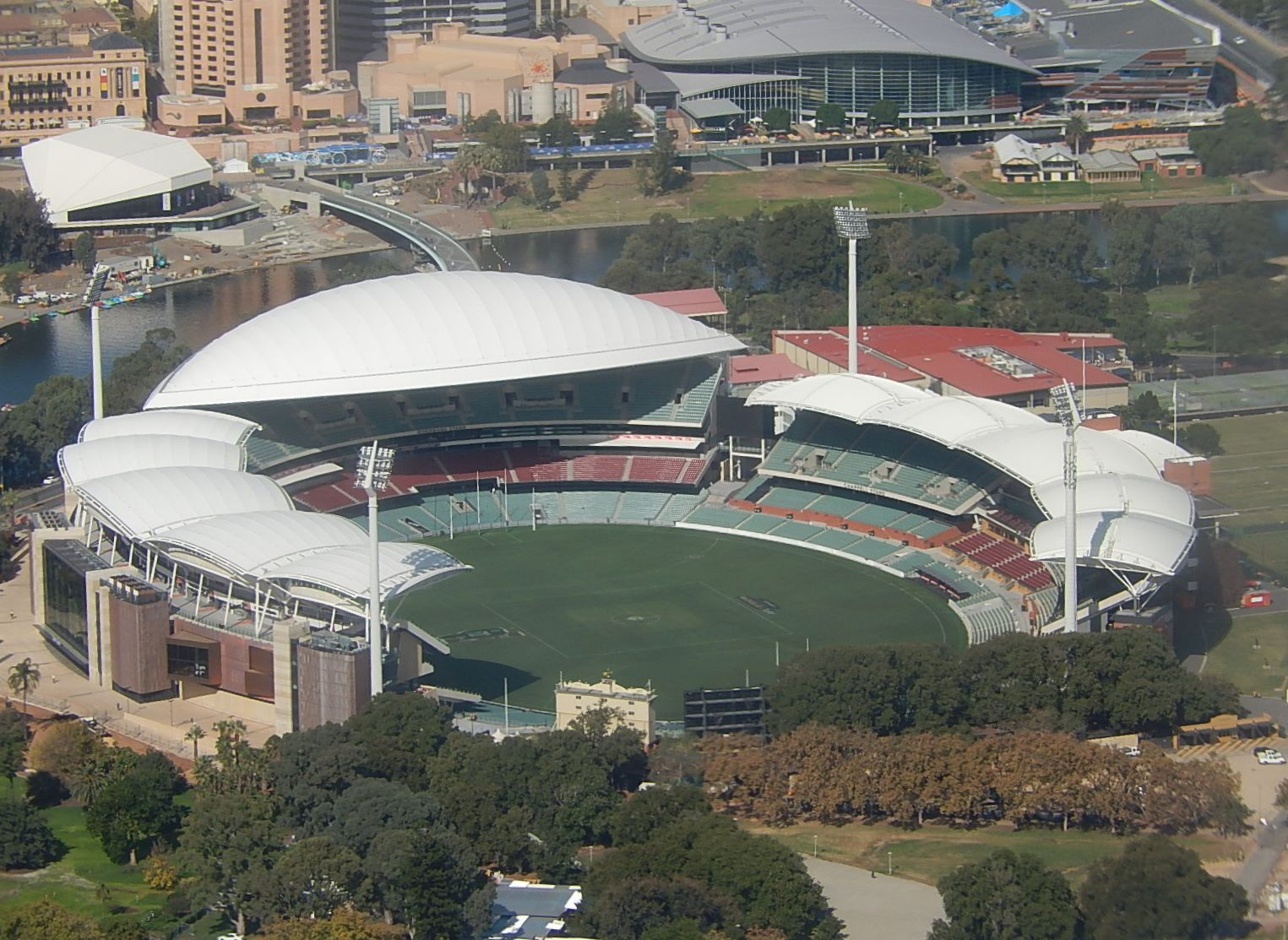
Adelaide Oval

Since 2014, Adelaide Oval has been the home ground of Port Adelaide's AFL team, shared with Adelaide.

Adelaide Oval has historically been used for SANFL finals (until 1974) and the Championship of Australia match. During the 1975 and 1976 seasons, Port Adelaide's SANFL Team was forced to play out of the ground following their dispute with the local council, using it for both match day playing and training purposes over the period. Its role as the primary venue for SANFL finals was supplanted by Football Park in 1974, following disagreements between the SANFL and South Australian Cricket Association (SACA).

Following multiple years of negotiations between the SANFL and SACA over the use of the ground and extensive redevelopment during the early 2010s, the ground was cleared for football usage purposes, allowing Port Adelaide to use the ground as its home ground from the 2014 season onwards. Port Adelaide also played the first official AFL match at the venue in 2011 against Melbourne.

Adelaide Oval has two stands named after significant Port Adelaide individuals, the Fos Williams Stand, and the Gavin Wanganeen Stand. Both were named after the redevelopment of the Eastern Stand at the ground, and are featured alongside other famous individuals from the SANFL and Adelaide.

=== Club creed ===
Fos Williams authored the club's creed in 1962.

We, the players and management of the Port Adelaide Football Club, accept the heritage which players and administrators have passed down to us; in doing so, we do not intend to rest in idleness, but shall strive with all our power to further this club's unexcelled achievements.
To do this, we believe that there is great merit and noble achievement in winning a Premiership. That to be successful, each and every one of us must be active, aggressive and devoted to this cause.
We agree that success is well within our reach and have confidence that each member of both the team and management will suffer personal sacrifices for the common end.
Also, we know that, should after striving to our utmost, after giving our everything still not be successful, our efforts will become a further part of this club's enviable tradition.
Finally, we concede there can be honour in defeat, but to each of us, honourable defeat of our club and guernsey can only come after human endeavour on the playing field is completely exhausted.

— Fos Williams

== Rivalries ==
=== AFL ===
==== Adelaide ====
Port Adelaide has a fierce rivalry with fellow South Australian AFL team Adelaide. Matches between the two teams are known as the 'Showdown'. The rivalry between Adelaide and Port Adelaide is often considered to be among the best rivalries in the Australian Football League, with Malcolm Blight, Australian Football Hall of Fame Legend, stating in 2009 that "there is no doubt it is the greatest rivalry in football". The Showdown rivalry also significantly draws upon the bitter, winner take all, competition for the two South Australian licences to join the AFL in the 1980s and early 1990s. As of 2026, there have been 60 Showdown matches contested; Port Adelaide have won 29 matches and Adelaide have won 31.

==== Brisbane Lions ====
This rivalry dates back to 1997, the inaugural season of Port Adelaide and the newly merged Brisbane Lions. In their early days, the two clubs had multiple close encounters, with a draw in two of their first three meetings. The two clubs would be the most dominant of the early 2000s, meeting in multiple finals and consistently finishing at the top of the ladder from 2001 to 2004. Notable encounters include a Round 22 match in 2002 to determine the minor premiership that year, which Port Adelaide won by a single goal, and a Round 17 match in 2003 with 7 lead changes in the final quarter, which Port Adelaide won by a point. The rivalry culminated with the 2004 AFL Grand Final, where Port Adelaide defeated Brisbane to win their first premiership, ending Brisbane's chance to win a record-tying fourth consecutive premiership.

=== SANFL ===
==== Norwood ====
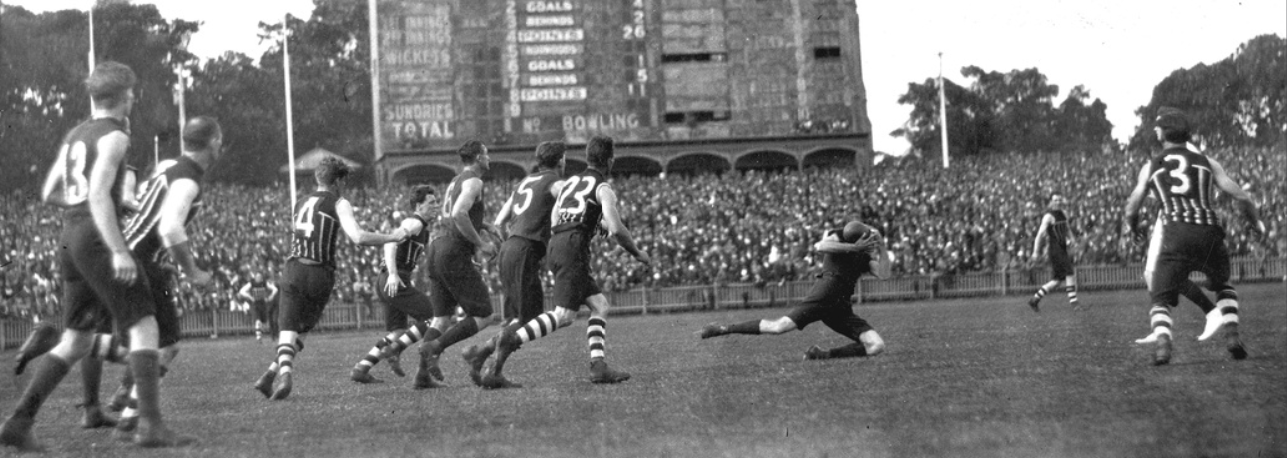
Norwood and Port Adelaide playing in the 1921 SAFL Grand Final

The rivalry between Port Adelaide and the Norwood Football Club is one of the longest standing rivalries in South Australian league football. The two clubs met for the first time in 1878, where Port Adelaide hosted Norwood, with Norwood winning 1–0. However, the rivalry between the two clubs would first begin in 1882, where Port Adelaide's first win over Norwood was controversially overruled by the league, with a follow-up game overshadowed by a misunderstanding at the gate which almost prevented Norwood players accessing the venue.

The clubs met in 14 Grand Finals prior to Port Adelaide's accession into the AFL and share over 60 premierships between them. The two clubs are the only clubs in any of the elite Australian Rules Football leagues (the SANFL, WAFL, and VFL/AFL) to win six successive premierships, with Port Adelaide ending Norwood's run of six consecutive premierships in 1884, and Norwood bringing Port Adelaide's streak to an end by defeating them in the 1960 Preliminary Final. They have met in three Grand Finals following Port Adelaide's entry to the AFL, with Port Adelaide winning in 1999 and Norwood winning in 1997 and 2014.

== Players ==
=== AFL playing list ===
Port Adelaide Football Club · AFL personnel
Playing list		Inactive list	Coaching staff
1 Connor Rozee (c); 2 Sam Powell-Pepper; 4 Todd Marshall; 5 Joe Berry; 6 Kane Farrell; 7 Jase Burgoyne; 8 Josh Sinn; 11 Christian Moraes; 12 Jack Lukosius; 14 Miles Bergman; 15 Jacob Wehr; 16 Ollie Wines; 17 Jack Whitlock; 18 Jason Horne-Francis; 19 Mitch Georgiades; 21 Aliir Aliir; 22 Logan Evans; 24 Jordon Sweet	25 Brandon Zerk-Thatcher; 26 Tom Cochrane; 27 Esava Ratugolea; 28 Willem Drew (vc); 31 Ewan Mackinlay*; 32 Harrison Ramm; 33 Darcy Byrne-Jones; 34 Lachie Jones; 35 Joe Richards; 37 Jack Watkins*; 38 Dante Visentini; 39 Mitch Zadow*; 41 Balyn O'Brien*; 43 Josh Lai; 44 Corey Durdin; 46 Xavier Bamert*; 47 Alex van Wyk*; Luke Pedlar		Senior coach: Josh Carr; Assistant coaches: Stuart Dew (senior assistant/midfield); Luke Webster (back line); Darren Reeves (forward line); Hamish Hartlett (contest/stoppage/opposition); Cam Sutcliffe (development – back line); Mitch Clisby (development – forward line); Legend: (c) captain; (vc) vice-captain; * rookie; Updated: 16 November 2026; Sources: Players, coaches

=== SANFL playing list ===
2026 Port Adelaide Football Club SANFL squad
SANFL list (Note: Port Adelaide AFL-listed players (not selected to play AFL) are allowed to play for the SANFL squad.)			Coaching Staff
1 Jez McLennan (c); 46 Douglas Cochrane; 47 Bailey Chamberlain; 48 Jake Weidemann; 49 Hugh Ferrari; 51 Aidan Turner; 52 Josh Byrne; 53 Michael Cavallaro; 54 Harrison Elbrow; 55 Nick Moore	56 Frazer Driscoll; 57 Dakota Sterzl; 58 Keanu Miller; 59 Dylan Whimpress; 60 Kyan Smith; 61 Ryan Carnelly; 62 Nic Couroupis; 63 Rory O'Driscoll; 64 Kye Roberts; 65 Heath Growden	66 Mac Bowman; 67 Tyran Hill; 68 Rome Burgoyne; 69 Kye Dean; 70 Fergus Kempe; 71 Cody Gilchrist; 72 Brad Thompson; 73 Terrel Rigney; 74 Thomas Griffiths; Damon Pitt	Head coach: Jacob Surjan; Legend: (c) Captain(s); (vc) Vice-captain(s); Updated: 16 November 2026; Source(s):

== Corporate ==
Guernsey sponsors
Period	Front sponsor	Back sponsor
1978–79	Lensworth Finance	
1980–82	Jetspress	
1983–87	Standard Chartered	
1988	Standard Chartered	Standard Chartered
1989–91	Standard Chartered	
1992	Alpine Retreat	
1993	Bee-Jays Roadlink	
1994	Seaton Hotel	Cash Converters
1995–96	Scott's Transport	Cash Converters
1997–07	Scott's Transport	Vodafone
2008–09	Bianco Construction & Industrial Supplies	Vodafone
2010	MyATM	AussieATM
2011	MyATM	Soaring Securities
2012	VIP Home Services	Foodbank
2013	Renault	VIP Home Services
2014–16	EnergyAustralia	Renault
2017	OAK	Renault
2018	OAK	OAK
2019	OAK	GFG Alliance
2020–24	MG Motor	GFG Alliance
2025-	MG Motor	KFC

=== Administrative positions ===
- Chairman: David Koch
- Chief executive: Matthew Richardson
- Football operations: Ben Rutten
- Board members:
  - David Koch
  - Grantley Stevens
  - Cos Cardone
  - Holly Ransom
  - Kevin Osborn
  - Greg Columbus
  - Tara Page
  - George Fiacchi

=== Sponsors ===
Major sponsors

- Santos Limited
- KFC
- MG Motor
- Allied Waste (SANFL)

Apparel sponsors

- Nike (1997–2006)
- Reebok (2007–2012)
- ISC (2013–2020)
- Macron (2021–present)

== Supporters ==
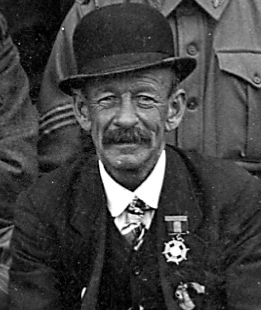
Sammy Lunn was a well-known Port Adelaide supporter during the 1910s and 1920s who would shout rhymes at games. He was also a celebrated fundraiser for returned servicemen.

The Port Adelaide Football Club has historically drawn its supporter base in the region of Port Adelaide. Since the club's entry to the AFL, support for the club had increased within suburbs of Adelaide – notably, the northern suburbs. It has also experienced growth in regional South Australia.

Port Adelaide has many supporter groups from all around Australia, with every state and territory except Tasmania having an officially recognised supporter group. Among these, the Port Adelaide Cheer Squad, the official supporter group from Adelaide, creates banners to be used by the club and has official seating to cheer at home games. There are also a number of unofficial supporter groups who perform activities for the club and its fans, such as the Outer Army and the Alberton Crowd.

=== Number-one ticket holders ===
- David Koch – Seven Network's Sunrise co-host, club chairman
- Stuart O'Grady – Australian professional road bicycle racer
- Teresa Palmer – Australian model and actress
- Bob Quinn – former Port Adelaide player
- Tony Santic – owner of racehorse Makybe Diva

=== Membership and attendance ===
Membership & attendance
Year	Membership		Ladder position		Home crowds		
Year	AFL audited	Change	Ladder position		Average	Rank	Change
Year	AFL audited	Change	Minor round	Finals	Average	Rank	Change
1997	35,809	N/A	9th	—N/a	35,829	4 / 16	N/A
1998	38,305	▲2,496	10th	—N/a	31,799	11 / 16	▼4,030
1999	37,166	▼1,139	7th	7th	31,269	9 / 16	▼530
2000	34,925	▼2,241	14th	—N/a	26,377	12 / 16	▼4,892
2001	33,296	▼1,629	3rd	5th	30,789	9 / 16	▲4,412
2002	36,229	▲2,933	1st	3rd	30,414	8 / 16	▼375
2003	35,425	▼804	1st	3rd	31,845	7 / 16	▲1,431
2004	36,340	▲915	1st	1st	29,877	12 / 16	▼1,968
2005	36,834	▲494	8th	6th	32,911	11 / 16	▲3,034
2006	35,648	▼1,184	13th	—N/a	27,257	15 / 16	▼5,654
2007	34,073	▼1,575	2nd	2nd	27,870	16 / 16	▲613
2008	34,185	▲112	13th	—N/a	23,842	16 / 16	▼4,028
2009	30,605	▼3,580	10th	—N/a	24,349	16 / 16	▲507
2010	29,092	▼1,513	10th	—N/a	23,044	16 / 16	▼1,305
2011	32,581	▲3,489	16th	—N/a	21,676	15 / 17	▼1,190
2012	35,543	▲1,003	14th	—N/a	19,911	16 / 18	▼3,155
2013	39,838	▲3,383	7th	5th	26,915	13 / 18	▲7,004
2014	48,968	▲9,130	5th	3rd	44,521	4 / 18	▲17,514
2015	54,057	▲5,089	9th	—N/a	43,749	4 / 18	▼680
2016	53,743	▼314	10th	—N/a	39,665	4 / 18	▼4,048
2017	52,129	▼1,614	5th	7th	38,136	6 / 18	▼1,529
2018	54,386	▲2,257	10th	—N/a	38,227	8 / 18	▲91
2019	51,951	▼2,435	10th	—N/a	33,950	8 / 18	▼4,277
2020	46,820	▼5,131	1st	3rd	9,987 (Note: Capped stadium capacities.)	4 / 18	▼23,963
2021	56,532	▲9,712	2nd	3rd	27,515	2 / 18	▲17,528
2022	58,643	▲2,111	11th	–	29,688	10 / 18	▲2,173
2023	64,041	▲5,398	3rd	5th	37,984	9 / 18	▲8,291
2024	66,015	▲1,974	2nd	3rd	37,871	10 / 18	▼113
2025	72,656	▲6,641	13th	—N/a	36,565	10 / 18	▼1,306

== Partnerships ==
=== Indigenous community ===
Richie Bray is Port Adelaide's first known Indigenous premiership player.

The Port Adelaide Football Club has a long-standing connection to the Indigenous Australian community. Initial club president John Hart Jr., alongside his father, were the founders of The Adelaide Milling and Mercantile Company in Port Adelaide, which employed Kaurna people alongside non-Indigenous workers as early as the 1850s. John Hart Sr. advocated for other settlers to refrain from killing and eating black swans as they were a totem of the Kaurna people. Harry Hewitt was named in Port Adelaide's side when they defeated Fitzroy by two goals on Adelaide Oval in 1891 and is the club's first known Indigenous Australian player. During the 1950s, St Francis House in Glanville housed young Indigenous boys, many of whom played for Port Adelaide. Richie Bray became the club's first known Indigenous player to win a premiership, featuring in the 1962, 1963 and 1965 premierships winning teams.

Port Adelaide has been represented by 70 Indigenous players across the SANFL and AFL competitions throughout its history. Upon the club's entry to the AFL in 1997, the club appointed its first Indigenous captain in Gavin Wanganeen. Wanganeen would later become the first Indigenous player in the AFL to play 300 games, and the first Indigenous player to join the board of an AFL club. Since 2023, Port Adelaide has rebranded to "Yartapuulti" during all rounds dedicated to the recognition of Indigenous Australians across all competitions. The name Yartapuulti is derived from the Kaurna word for the region around the Port River.

In 2008, the club started the Aboriginal Power Cup to help Indigenous secondary school students achieve improved education, leadership and cultural connection targets through the use of football. As of 2026, the program has expanded to include 70 schools, with over 7,500 students participating in the program over its lifetime. The program is longest running joint education and AFL community program for Aboriginal students in the Australian professional sports industry.

=== China partnership ===
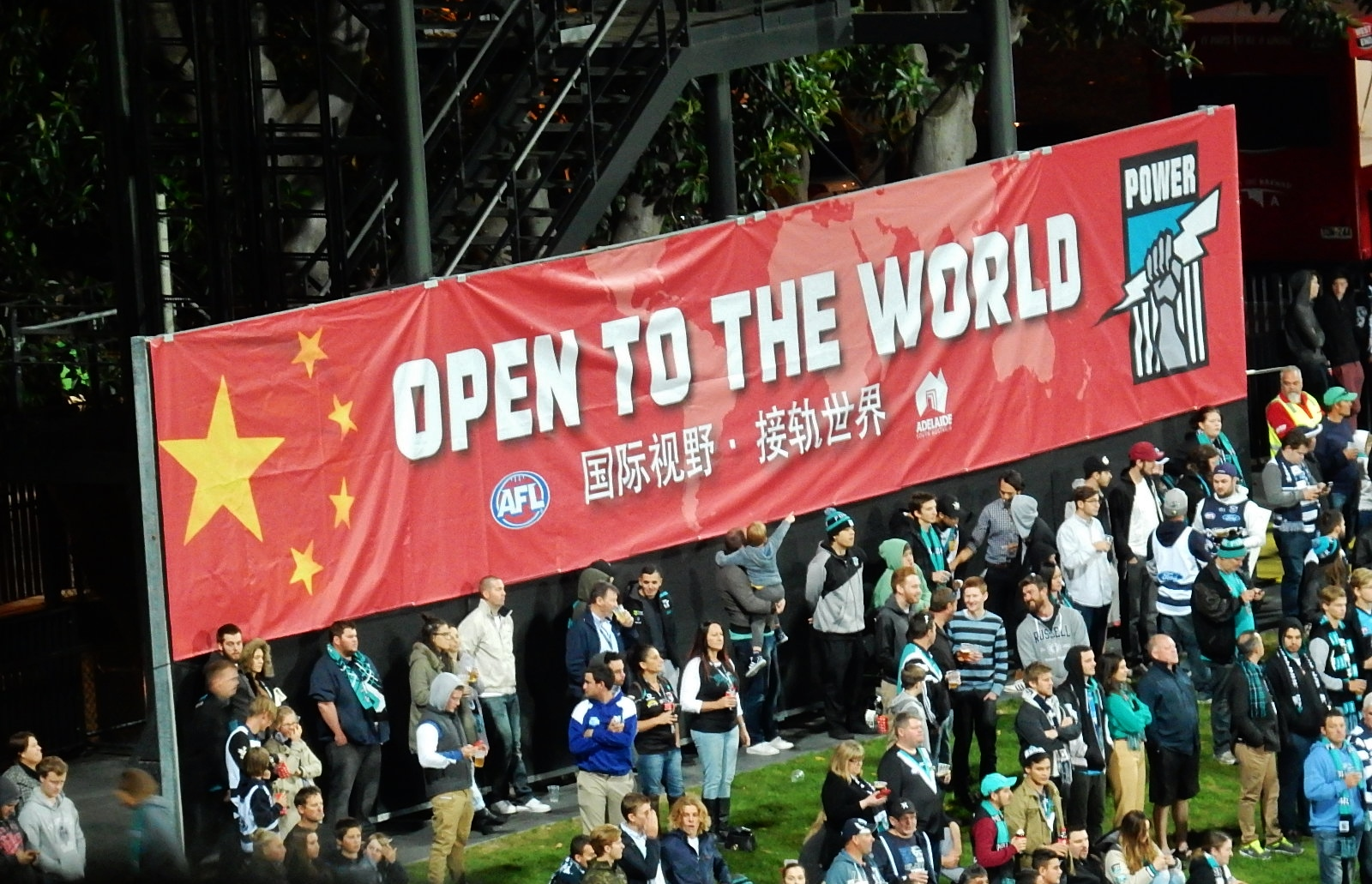
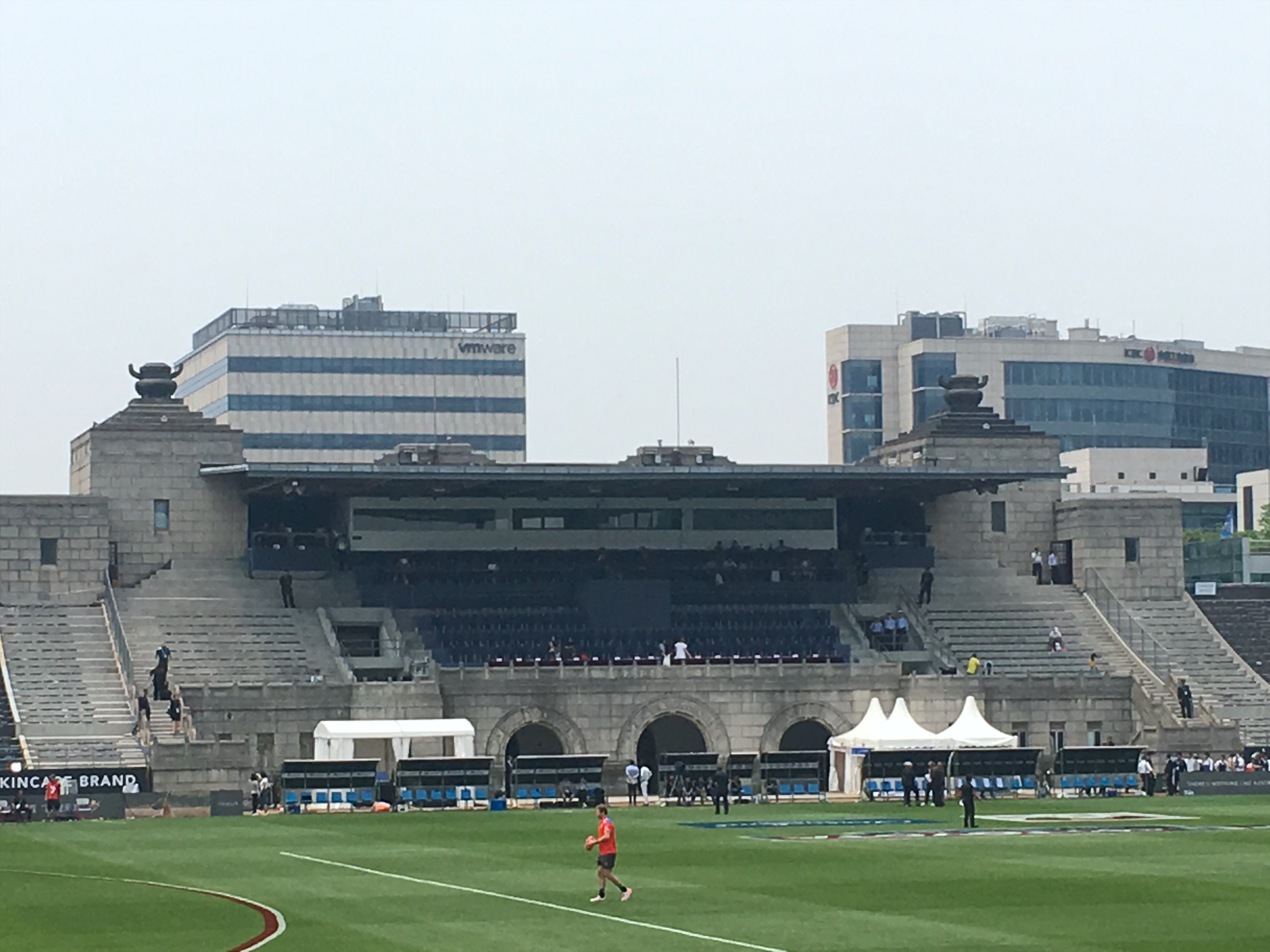
Left: China partnership banner displayed at a Port Adelaide home game at Adelaide Oval
Right: Jiangwan Stadium in Shanghai where Port Adelaide played an annual fixture between 2017 and 2019

On 14 April 2016, Port Adelaide announced it had struck a three-year multimillion-dollar partnership with leading Chinese property developer Shanghai Cred, where Port Adelaide would take primary responsibility for developing Australian rules football in China. This involved the club holding annual training camps and providing sponsorship in China, as well as producing AFL programs and broadcasting games in the country via China Central Television and other networks. The same day, it was revealed by then Prime Minister Malcolm Turnbull that Port Adelaide had an intention to play an in-season AFL match in China. As part of the partnership, Port Adelaide also agreed to annually run an Australian rules football program in over 20 Chinese schools, culminating in a football carnival the same week the AFL premiership match is held in Shanghai.

The first AFL game played for premiership points was played in May 2017 between the Gold Coast Suns and Port Adelaide. In October 2018, the AFL announced St Kilda would be taking over from the Gold Coast Suns in the China fixture, with Gold Coast citing guernsey disagreements as a reason for exiting the deal. In 2019, 4.01 million people watched the match between Port Adelaide and St Kilda. Due to the COVID-19 pandemic, the match was not played in the 2020 or 2021 AFL seasons. The contract between Shanghai Cred and Port Adelaide expired in 2023.

== In film ==
To celebrate the club's 150th anniversary in 2020, Port Adelaide collaborated with 57 Films to produce a documentary about the history of the club. The documentary film, titled This Is Port Adelaide, was created by Adelaide director Nicole Miller, known for her work on TV series The AFL Show, which explained the sport to a Chinese audience. The film was co-produced by Miller, James Moody, and Paul Ryan, with cinematography by Isaac Walgos and editing by Matt Gierke. Benjamin Speed composed the film score.

Initially slated for a November 2020 release as part of the Adelaide Film Festival, the film's premiere of the film was delayed until February 2021 due to the COVID-19 pandemic. Following a national cinema release in April 2021, the film was released on Stan on 4 June 2021.

== Club achievements ==
Port Adelaide is one of the most successful clubs in senior level football, having won a combined 37 senior premierships across both the AFL and SANFL competitions. The club won its first premiership in 1884, while its thirty-seventh and most recent senior level premiership was in 2004.

The club has seen two sustained periods of success during its existence. The first came under the leadership of Fos Williams, who coached the club to 9 senior premierships, including five consecutive premierships. The second came under John Cahill, who coached the club to an equal-record 10 senior premierships in the SANFL.

The club has won a record four Championship of Australia titles, and won the Stanley H. Lewis trophy 12 times, second to only Norwood (14).

Club Achievements
Competition	Level	Wins	Years won
Premierships
Australian Football League	Seniors	1	2004
South Australian National Football League	Seniors (1877–2013); Reserves (2014–present)	36	1884, 1890, 1897, 1903, 1906, 1910, 1913, 1914, 1921, 1928, 1936, 1937, 1939, 1951, 1954, 1955, 1956, 1957, 1958, 1959, 1962, 1963, 1965, 1977, 1979, 1980, 1981, 1988, 1989, 1990, 1992, 1994, 1995, 1996, 1998, 1999
South Australian National Football League	Reserves (1906–2018)	19	1911, 1923, 1933, 1936, 1947, 1948, 1952, 1955, 1956, 1957, 1958, 1959, 1963, 1980, 1983, 1988, 1996, 1997, 2010
South Australian National Football League	Under 19s (1937–2008)	13	1946, 1950, 1953, 1962, 1974, 1975, 1976, 1977, 1991, 1999, 2001, 2006, 2007
South Australian National Football League	Under 17s (1939–2008)	6	1951, 1955, 1961, 1971, 1972, 1994
South Australian National Football League	Under 18s (2009–2014)	1	2011
South Australian National Football League	War League (1942–1944)	1	1942 (Note: Won the 1942 premiership as a merged team with West Torrens. The league merged all clubs during the Second World War.)
South Australian Patriotic Football League	Seniors (1916–1918)	2	1916, 1917
Other titles and honours
Championship of Australia	Seniors	4	1890, 1910, 1913, 1914
Stanley H Lewis Memorial Trophy (1962–2014)	Multiple	12	1962, 1963, 1964, 1970, 1977, 1979, 1980, 1988, 1989, 1992, 1994, 1999
AFL pre-season competition	Seniors	2	2001, 2002
SANFL Lightning Premiership	Seniors	1	1948
Finishing positions
Australian Football League	Minor premiership	4	2002, 2003, 2004, 2020
Australian Football League	Runners Up	1	2007
Australian Football League	Wooden spoons	0	Nil
South Australian National Football League	Minor premiership	44	1889, 1902, 1903, 1904, 1906, 1907, 1909, 1911, 1912, 1913, 1914, 1915, 1921, 1928, 1931, 1934, 1935, 1936, 1939, 1940, 1945, 1951, 1953, 1954, 1955, 1956, 1957, 1959, 1960, 1961, 1962, 1964, 1965, 1970, 1976, 1977, 1980, 1982, 1984, 1988, 1990, 1992, 1999, 2014
South Australian National Football League	Runners Up	37	1878, 1879, 1883, 1887, 1888, 1889, 1891, 1892, 1898, 1901, 1904, 1905, 1907, 1909, 1911, 1912, 1915, 1929, 1930, 1934, 1935, 1938, 1945, 1946, 1953, 1964, 1966, 1967, 1968, 1971, 1972, 1976, 1984, 1997, 2014, 2017, 2019
South Australian National Football League	Wooden spoons	5	1886, 1896, 1900, 2024, 2026

== Club honour boards ==
=== Honour board ===
In the Port Adelaide clubrooms at Alberton Oval, there is a large wooden honour board with gold text that details every season of the club from 1870 to the present.

Port Adelaide Football Club honour board
Year	Position	President	CEO	Coach	Captain	Best & Fairest	Leading goalkicker	
**Interclub matches**
1870	Third	J. Hart	R.Leicester	J.Wald	J.Wald	J.Wald	J.Wald	2
1871	Third	J. Hart	G.Ireland	F.Stone	F.Stone	F.Stone	Unknown	1
1872	Second	J. Hart	G.Ireland	G.Ireland	G.Ireland	N/A	N/A	0
1873	Second	J. Hart	F.Ireland	H.Sparnon	H.Sparnon; G.Middleton	S.Tyzack	S.Tyzack	1
1874	Second	J. Hart	F.Ireland	J.Rann	J.Rann; C.Wells	N/A	N/A	0
1875	Second	J. Hart	F.Ireland	R.Sandilands	R.Sandilands	H.Ford	H.Ford; Mr.Warren	2
1876	Fifth	J. Hart	C.Wells	W.Fletcher	W.Fletcher	E. Le Messurier	S.Tyzack^{2} J.Rann; E. Le Messurier	1
**South Australian Football Association era**
1877	Fourth	J. Hart	C.Wells	W.Fletcher	W.Fletcher	T.Smith	A. Le Messurier	5
1878	Second	J. Hart	C.Wells	W.Fletcher	W.Fletcher	T.Smith^{2}	E. Le Messurier; J.Carter	3
1879	Second	J. Hart	C.Wells	W.Fletcher	W.Fletcher	T.Smith^{3}	E. Le Messurier^{2}	4
**Alberton Oval acquired**
1880	Sixth	J. Formby	J.W.Channon	J.A.Atkins	J.A.Atkins; J.Carter	J.Sidoli	E. Le Messurier^{3}	3
1881	Fifth	J. Formby	E. Le Messurier; J.Carter	J.Sandilands	J.Sandilands	J.Sidoli^{2}	H.Watt	6
1882	Third	J. Formby	E. C. Le Messurier	C.Kellett	H.Frayne; C.Kellett	J.Munro	G.Slatter	6
1883	Second	J. Formby	E. C. Le Messurier	R.Turpenny	E. Le Messurier; R.Turpenny	R.Kirkpatrick	J.Litchfield ✪	13
1884 ⚑	First	J. Formby	E. C. Le Messurier	R.Turpenny	R.Turpenny	C.Kellett; G.Cairns	R.Roy ✪	25
1885	Third	J. Formby	E. C. Le Messurier	R.Turpenny	R.Turpenny; C.Kellett	M.Coffee	R.Roy^{2}	13
1886 🞭	Fourth	J. Formby	J.Litchfield	J.McGargill	W.Bushby	C.Fry	M.Coffee; C.Fry	6
1887	Second	J. Formby	E. C. Le Messurier	J.McGargill	W.Bushby	W.Bushby; R.Walsh	A.Bushby	22
1888	Second	J. Formby	J.Sweeney	J.McGargill	W.Bushby	H.Phillips	H.Phillips	24
1889	Second	J. Formby	R.Cruickshank	J.McGargill	W.Bushby	G.Hamilton	C.Fry^{2} ✪	32
1890 ⚑ 🞛	First	J. Formby	R.Cruickshank	J.McGargill	K.McKenzie	C.Fry^{2}	J.McKenzie ✪	54
1891	Second	J. Formby	R.Cruickshank; A.Bushby	J.McGargill	K.McKenzie	H.Phillips^{2}	J.McKenzie^{2}	37
1892	Second	J. Formby	J.Sweeney	J.McGargill	K.McKenzie	H.Phillips^{3}	A.McKenzie	43
1893	Third	J.Cleave	J.Sweeney	J.McGargill	K.McKenzie	W.Murray; H.Phillips^{4}	A.McKenzie^{2}	59
1894	Third	J.Cleave	J.Sweeney	J.McGargill	K.McKenzie	A.Miers	A.McKenzie^{3}	36
1895	Third	W.Fisher	J.Sweeney	J.McGargill	A.Miers	O.L'Estage	A.McKenzie^{4}	25
1896 🞭	Fifth	W.Fisher; C.Tucker	H.Hills	J.McGargill	K.McKenzie	G.Linklater	A.Lees	19
**Modern scoring system adopted**
1897 ⚑	First	W.Fisher; C.Tucker	H.Hills	J.McGargill	K.McKenzie	K.McKenzie	A.Lees^{2} ✪	26
**Regular SAFA Grand Finals commence**
1898	Second	W.Fisher	H.Hills; J.Sweeney	J.McGargill	K.McKenzie	A.Hosie	W.Stark	31
1899	Third	W.Fisher	J.Sweeney	J.McGargill	H.Phillips	S.Malin ★	W.Stark^{2}	13
1900 🞭	Fifth	W.Fisher	J.Sweeney	J.McGargill	H.Phillips; G.Davis	J.Quinn	H.Tompkins	16
**Federation of Australia**
1901	Second	R.Cruickshank	J.Sweeney	J.McGargill	A.Hosie	E.Strawns	J.Quinn	27
1902	Disqualified	W.Mattinson	J.Sweeney	J.McGargill	A.Hosie	L.Corston	M.Healy	25
1903 ⚑	First	W.Mattinson	J.Sweeney	J.McGargill	A.Hosie	J.Tompkins	J.Tompkins	40
1904	Second	W.Mattinson	J.Sweeney	J.McGargill	A.Hosie; J.Quinn	L.Corston	J.Tompkins^{2}	28
1905	Second	W.Mattinson	J.Sweeney	J.McGargill	J.Quinn	J.Quinn^{2}	J.Mathison ✪	30
1906 ⚑	First	W.Mattinson	J.Hodge	J.McGargill	J.Fletcher; L.Cortson	E.Strawns^{2}	J.Mathison^{2} ✪	42
**South Australian Football League era**
1907	Second	W.Mattinson	J.Hodge	J.McGargill	L.Corston	J.Mack ★	J.Quinn^{2} ✪	32
1908	Third	W.Mattinson	J.Hodge	J.McGargill	E.Strawns; M.Donaghy	S.Dickson	J.Mathison^{3} ✪	33
1909	Second	W.Mattinson	J.Hodge	A.Hosie	M.Donaghy	S.Dickson^{2}	A.Congear	12
1910 ⚑ 🞛	First	W.Mattinson	J.Hodge	A.Hosie	J.Woollard	S.Hosking ★	F.Hansen	46
1911	Second	R.Cruickshank	J.Hodge	M.Donaghy; J.Woollard	G.Dempster	H.Oliver	F.Hansen^{2} ✪	41
1912	Second	R.Cruickshank	J.Hodge	M.Donaghy; J.Woollard	C.Cocks; S.Hosking	H.Oliver^{2}	F.Hansen^{3} ✪	37
1913 ⚑ 🞛	First	A.Benson	J.Hodge	J.Londrigan	J.Londrigan	H.Eaton	F.Hansen^{4} ✪	39
1914 ⚑ 🞛	First	A.Benson	J.Hodge	J.Londrigan	J.Londrigan	J.Ashley	J.Dunn ✪	33
1915	Second	A.Benson	J.Hodge	A.McFarlane	A.McFarlane	H.Eaton^{2}	A.Congear^{2}	21
**South Australian Patriotic League (World War I)**
1916 ⚑	First	Unknown	C.Tyler	H.Eaton	H.Eaton	N/A	J.Hayman	40
1917 ⚑	First	H.Adams	C.Tyler	H.Eaton	H.Eaton	N/A	J.Hayman^{2}	39
1918	Third	A.Benson	C.Tyler	H.Eaton	H.Eaton	N/A	A. Congear^{3}	15
**Resumption of South Australian Football League**
1919	Fourth	A.Benson	C.Tyler	F.Hansen	H.Pope; A.McFarlane	J.Ashley^{2}	L.Lackman ✪	26
1920	Third	A.Benson	C.Tyler	F.Hansen	J.Robertson; A.Olds	C.Adams	E.Dewar	24
1921 ⚑	First	A.Benson	C.Tyler	S.Hosking	H.Oliver	C.Adams^{2} ★	M.Allingham	43
1922	Fifth	H.Skipper	C.Tyler	S.Howie	S.Howie	C.Dayman	M.Allingham^{2}	47
1923	Seventh	H.Skipper	A.McKelvie	C.Dayman	C.Dayman	L.Dayman	M.Allingham^{3}	42
1924	Fourth	H.Skipper	A.McKelvie	A.Hosie	C.Keal	L.Dayman^{2}	M.Allingham^{4}	28
1925	Third	H.Skipper	A.McKelvie	A.Hosie	C.Keal	P.Bampton ★	H.Logan	56
1926	Third	P.Cherry	A.McKelvie	M.Allingham	M.Allingham	L.Hodge	H.Logan^{2}	36
**South Australian National Football League era**
1927	Third	P.Cherry	C.Hayter	S.Hosking	P.Bampton	C.Keal	H.Logan^{3}	66
1928 ⚑	First	P.Cherry	C.Hayter	S.Hosking	V.Johnson	L.Dayman^{3}	L.Dayman	41
1929	Second	P.Cherry	C.Hayter	S.Hosking	V.Johnson	E.Mucklow	L.Dayman^{2} ✪	86
1930	Second	P.Cherry	C.Hayter	S.Hosking	V.Johnson	V.Johnson	L.Dayman^{3}	89
1931	Third	P.Cherry	C.Hayter	S.Hosking	V.Johnson	M.Allingham	L.Dayman^{4}	70
1932	Fourth	C.Gun	C.Hayter	S.Ween	S.Ween	E.Mucklow^{2}	N.Hender	55
1933	Fifth	C.Gun	C.Hayter	H.Dewar	S.Ween	J.Dermody	N.Hender^{2}	48
1934	Second	C.Gun	C.Hayter	L.Ashby	V.Johnson	A.Hollingworth	J.Prideaux	73
1935	Second	C.Gun	C.Hayter	L.Ashby	R.Johnson	J.Dermody^{2}	J.Prideaux^{2}	95
1936 ⚑	First	C.Gun	C.Hayter	S.Hosking	J.Dermody	A.Hollingworth^{2}	J.Prideaux^{3}	86
1937 ⚑	First	P.Cherry	C.Hayter	S.Hosking	J.Dermody	R.Quinn	R.Quinn	51
1938	Second	P.Cherry	C.Hayter	S.Hosking	N.Hender	R.Quinn^{2} ★	A.Hollingworth	45
1939 ⚑	First	P.Cherry	C.Hayter	R.Quinn	R.Quinn	A.Reval	H.Abbott	49
1940	Third	P.Cherry	C.Hayter	R.Quinn; A.Reval	R.Quinn; A.Reval	R.Schumann	A.McLean	47
1941	Fourth	P.Cherry	C.Hayter	A.Reval	A.Reval	J.Skelley	A.McLean^{2}	62
**Temporary geographical merger with West Torrens (World War II)**
1942 ⚑	First	P.Cherry	C.Hayter	S.Hosking	L.Roberts	N/A	M.Shaw	42
1943	Second	P.Cherry	C.Hayter	S.Hosking	L.Roberts	N/A	M.Shaw^{2}	55
1944	Second	P.Cherry	C.Hayter	M.Drury	L.Roberts	N/A	M.Shaw^{3}	69
**Competition returns to unaligned clubs**
1945	Second	P.Cherry	C.Hayter	R.Quinn	R.Quinn	R.Quinn^{3} ★	R.Quinn^{2}	51
1946	Second	P.Cherry	C.Hayter	R.Quinn	R.Quinn	L.Roberts	K.Jolly	46
1947	Third	P.Cherry	C.Hayter	R.Quinn	R.Quinn	R.Quinn^{4}	A.McLean^{3} ✪	80
1948	Seventh	P.Cherry	C.Hayter; L.Dayman	L.Roberts	L.Roberts	R.Russell	A.McLean^{4}	48
1949	Sixth	P.Cherry	A.McLean	J.McCarthy	R.Schumann	R.Russell^{2}	L.Zucker	51
1950	Third	W.Baudinet	A.McLean	F.Williams	F.Williams	F.Williams	F.Williams	40
1951 ⚑	First	W.Baudinet	A.McLean	F.Williams	F.Williams	R.Russell^{3}	N.Clark	37
1952	Third	B.Harvey	A.McLean	F.Williams	F.Williams	R.Whitaker	R.Clift	26
1953	Second	B.Harvey	A.McLean	F.Williams	F.Williams	H.McDonald	R.Whitaker	35
1954 ⚑	First	B.Harvey	A.McLean	F.Williams	F.Williams	R.Clift	T.Garland	44
1955 ⚑	First	B.Harvey	A.McLean	F.Williams	F.Williams	F.Williams^{2}	F.Williams^{2}	35
1956 ⚑	First	B.Harvey	A.McLean	F.Williams	F.Williams	E.Whelan	R.Johns ✪	70
1957 ⚑	First	B.Harvey	A.McLean	F.Williams	F.Williams	N.Hayes	R.Johns^{2}	77
1958 ⚑	First	B.Harvey	A.McLean	F.Williams	F.Williams	G.Motley	R.Johns^{3} ✪	55
1959 ⚑	First	B.Harvey	A.McLean	G.Motley	G.Motley	G.Motley^{2}	W.Dittmar ✪	74
1960	Third	B.Harvey	A.McLean	G.Motley	G.Motley	N.Hayes^{2}	W.Dittmar^{2} ✪	69
1961	Third	B.Harvey	A.McLean	G.Motley	G.Motley	J.Potter	R.Johns^{4}	54
1962 ⚑	First	B.Harvey	A.McLean	F.Williams	G.Motley	P.Obst	R.Johns^{5}	76
1963 ⚑	First	B.Harvey	A.McLean	F.Williams	G.Motley	G.Motley^{3}	R.Johns^{6} ✪	54
1964	Second	B.Harvey	A.McLean	F.Williams	G.Motley	J.Potter^{2}	J.Potter	30
1965 ⚑	First	B.Harvey	A.McLean	F.Williams	G.Motley	G.Motley^{4}	E.Freeman	74
1966	Second	B.Harvey	A.McLean	F.Williams	G.Motley	J.Cahill	E.Freeman^{2} ✪	81
1967	Second	B.Harvey	A.McLean	F.Williams	J.Cahill	J.Potter^{3}	E.Freeman^{3}	74
1968	Second	B.Harvey	A.McLean	F.Williams	J.Cahill	J.Cahill^{2}	R.Ebert	44
1969	Sixth	B.Harvey	A.McLean	F.Williams	J.Cahill	J.Potter^{4}	M.Dittmar	28
1970	Third	B.Harvey	A.McLean	F.Williams	J.Cahill	J.Cahill^{3}	E.Freeman^{4}	75
1971	Second	B.Harvey	A.McLean	F.Williams	J.Cahill	R.Ebert ★	E.Freeman^{5}	50
1972	Second	B.Harvey	A.McLean	F.Williams	J.Cahill	R.Ebert^{2}	M.James	62
1973	Fifth	K.Duthie	A.McLean	F.Williams	J.Cahill	J.Cahill^{4}	J.Cahill	59
1974	Third	K.Duthie	A.McLean	J.Cahill	R.Ebert	R.Ebert^{3} ★	D.Cahill	54
1975	Third	K.Duthie	A.McLean	J.Cahill	R.Ebert	P.Woite ★	T.Evans	64
1976	Second	K.Duthie	A.McLean	J.Cahill	R.Ebert	R.Ebert^{4} ★	R.Gerlach	90
1977 ⚑	First	K.Duthie	A.McLean	J.Cahill	R.Ebert	R.Ebert^{5}	T.Evans^{2} ✪	88
1978	Third	K.Duthie	A.McLean	J.Cahill	R.Ebert	S.Clifford	T.Evans^{3} ✪	90
1979 ⚑	First	K.Duthie	A.McLean	J.Cahill	B.Cunningham	M.Faletic	T.Evans^{4}	82
1980 ⚑	First	K.Duthie	A.McLean	J.Cahill	B.Cunningham	S.Clifford^{2}	T.Evans^{5} ✪	146
1981 ⚑	First	K.Duthie	R.Taylor	J.Cahill	B.Cunningham	R.Ebert^{6}	T.Evans^{6} ✪	98
1982	Third	K.Duthie	R.Taylor	J.Cahill	B.Cunningham	C.Bradley	T.Evans^{7} ✪	125
1983	Sixth	K.Duthie	R.Taylor	R.Ebert	R.Ebert	S.Clifford^{3}	T.Evans^{8}	63
1984	Second	K.Duthie	I.McKenzie	R.Ebert	R.Ebert	C.Bradley^{2}	T.Evans^{9}	137
1985	Seventh	K.Duthie	I.McKenzie	R.Ebert	R.Ebert	C.Bradley^{3}	T.Evans^{10}	96
1986	Fourth	B.Weber	I.McKenzie	R.Ebert	R.Johnston	M.Leslie	D.Smith	49
1987	Fourth	B.Weber	I.McKenzie	R.Ebert	R.Johnston	B.Abernethy	D.Smith^{2}	71
1988 ⚑	First	B.Weber	I.McKenzie	J.Cahill	R.Johnston	G.Phillips	S.Hodges	74
1989 ⚑	First	B.Weber	R.Clayton	J.Cahill	R.Johnston	R.Johnston	S.Hodges^{2}	79
1990 ⚑	First	B.Weber	R.Clayton	J.Cahill	R.Johnston	S.Hodges ★	S.Hodges^{3} ✪	153
1991	Fifth	B.Weber	R.Clayton	J.Cahill	G.Phillips	P.Northeast	D.Borlase	25
1992 ⚑	First	B.Weber	B.Cunningham	J.Cahill	G.Phillips	N.Buckley ★	M.Tylor ✪	97
1993	Third	G.Boulton	B.Cunningham	J.Cahill	G.Phillips	T.Bond	M.Tylor^{2} ✪	90
1994 ⚑	First	G.Boulton	B.Cunningham	J.Cahill	T.Ginever	T.Ginever	S.Hodges^{4} ✪	130
1995 ⚑	First	G.Boulton	B.Cunningham	J.Cahill	T.Ginever	R.West	M.Tylor^{3}	53
1996 ⚑	First	G.Boulton	B.Cunningham; R.Clayton; D.Hutton	J.Cahill; S.Williams	T.Ginever	S.Hodges^{2}	S.Hodges^{5} ✪	117
**Australian Football League era** (see also continued SANFL presence)
1997	Ninth	G.Boulton	B.Cunningham	J.Cahill	G.Wanganeen	D.Mead	S.Cummings	70
1998	Tenth	G.Boulton	B.Cunningham	J.Cahill	G.Wanganeen	A.Kingsley	W.Tredrea	33
1999	Seventh	G.Boulton	B.Cunningham	M.Williams	G.Wanganeen	S.Paxman	W.Tredrea^{2}	40
2000	Fourteenth	G.Boulton	B.Cunningham	M.Williams	G.Wanganeen	B.Montgomery	W.Tredrea^{3}	32
2001	Fifth	G.Boulton	B.Cunningham	M.Williams	M.Primus	W.Tredrea	W.Tredrea^{4}	51
2002	Third	G.Boulton	B.Cunningham	M.Williams	M.Primus	M.Primus	S.Dew	51
2003	Fourth	G.Boulton	B.Cunningham	M.Williams	M.Primus	G.Wanganeen	W.Tredrea^{5}	58
2004 ⚑	First	G.Boulton	B.Cunningham	M.Williams	M.Primus; W.Tredrea	W.Tredrea^{2}	W.Tredrea^{6}	81
2005	Sixth	G.Boulton	J.James	M.Williams	M.Primus	W.Tredrea^{3}	W.Tredrea^{7}	65
2006	Twelfth	G.Boulton	J.James	M.Williams	W.Tredrea	B.Lade	J.Mahoney	29
2007	Second	G.Boulton	J.James	M.Williams	W.Tredrea	K.Cornes	B.Ebert	56
2008	Thirteenth	G.Boulton	J.James; M.Haysman	M.Williams	W.Tredrea	K.Cornes^{2}	D.Motlop	57
2009	Tenth	B.Duncanson	M.Haysman	M.Williams	D.Cassisi	W.Tredrea^{4}	W.Tredrea^{8}	51
2010	Tenth	B.Duncanson	M.Haysman	M.Williams; M.Primus	D.Cassisi	K.Cornes^{3}	J.Schulz	33
2011	Sixteenth	B.Duncanson	M.Haysman; K.Thomas	M.Primus	D.Cassisi	T.Boak; J.Trengove	R.Gray	32
2012	Fourteenth	B.Duncanson; D.Koch	K.Thomas	M.Primus; G.Hocking	D.Cassisi	K.Cornes^{4}	J.Schulz^{2}	42
2013	Fifth	D.Koch	K.Thomas	K.Hinkley	T.Boak	C.Wingard	J.Schulz^{3}	49
**Administrative independence from the SANFL**
2014	Third	D.Koch	K.Thomas	K.Hinkley	T.Boak	R.Gray	J.Schulz^{4}	66
2015	Ninth	D.Koch	K.Thomas	K.Hinkley	T.Boak	R.Gray^{2}	C.Wingard	53
2016	Tenth	D.Koch	K.Thomas	K.Hinkley	T.Boak	R.Gray^{3}	C.Wingard^{2}	38
2017	Seventh	D.Koch	K.Thomas	K.Hinkley	T.Boak	P.Ryder	C.Dixon	49
2018	Tenth	D.Koch	K.Thomas	K.Hinkley	T.Boak	J.Westhoff	R.Gray^{2}	36
2019	Tenth	D.Koch	K.Thomas	K.Hinkley	O.Wines; T.Jonas	T.Boak^{2}	C.Rozee	29
2020	Third	D.Koch	K.Thomas	K.Hinkley	T.Jonas	D.Byrne-Jones	C.Dixon^{2}	34
2021	Third	D.Koch	M.Richardson	K.Hinkley	T.Jonas	O.Wines^{★}	C.Dixon^{3}	48
2022	Eleventh	D.Koch	M.Richardson	K.Hinkley	T.Jonas	C.Rozee	T.Marshall	45
2023	Fifth	D.Koch	M.Richardson	K.Hinkley	T.Jonas	Z.Butters	J.Finlayson	38
2024	Third	D.Koch	M.Richardson	K.Hinkley	C.Rozee	Z.Butters^{2}	M.Georgiades	44
2025	Thirteenth	D.Koch	M.Richardson	K.Hinkley	C.Rozee	Z. Butters^{3}	M.Georgiades^{2}	58
2026	Fifteenth	D.Koch	M.Richardson	J.Carr	C.Rozee	J.Horne-Francis	M.Georgiades^{3}	51
⚑ = Premier 🞛 = Championship of Australia 🞭 = Wooden Spoon ★ = League Best and Fairest ✪ = League Leading Goalkicker^{2} = Multiple Best & Fairest or Leading Goalkicker

==== SANFL honour board (post AFL entry) ====
Port Adelaide Football Club honour roll (SANFL since 1997)
Season	Final position	Coach	Captain	A.R McLean Medal	Leading goal kicker	
1997	Second	S.Williams	T.Ginever	T.Ginever	P.McGuinness	36
1998 ⚑	First	S.Williams	D.Borlase	B.Beinke	B.Beinke	39
1999 ⚑	First	S.Williams	D.Brown	D.Poole	P.Evans	35
2000	Third	S.Williams	D.Poole	P.McGuinness	P.Smith	41
2001	Third	S.Williams	D.Poole	R.O'Connor ★	T.Brown	27
2002	Sixth	S.Williams	D.Poole	C.Ah Chee	M.Lokan	22
2003	Fifth	S.Williams	D.Poole	B.Ebert ★	P.Evans	46
2004	Sixth	M.Knights	T.Brown	K.De Pasquale	P.Evans	29
2005	Third	J.Cahill	T.Brown	J.Clayton ★	C.Waterhouse	75
2006	Fifth	T.Ginever	M.Clayton	J.Clayton	C.Waterhouse	52
2007	Sixth	T.Ginever	M.Clayton	J.Clayton	B.Lecras	45
2008	Fifth	T.Ginever	C.Ah Chee	J.Clayton	D.Hargraves	53
2009	Eighth	T.Ginever	C.Ah Chee	B.Murray	J.Perry	43
2010	Eighth	T.Bamford	J.Meiklejohn	S.Summerton	C.Cloke	25
2011	Sixth	T.Bamford	J.Meiklejohn	M.Dolling	B.Mercer	30
2012	Seventh	T.Bamford	J.Meiklejohn	J.Clayton	L.Harder	29
2013	Sixth	K.McGregor	J.Meiklejohn	S.Gray	J.Thurgood	38
2014	Second	G.Hocking	S.Summerton	S.Summerton	J.Butcher	32
2015	Fourth	G.Hocking	S.Summerton	S.Summerton^{2}	M.Harvey	21
2016	Sixth	C.Cornes	S.Summerton	K.Mitchell	L.Reynolds	43
2017	Second	C.Cornes	S.Summerton	B.Ah Chee	B.Eddy ✪	59
2018	Ninth	M.Lokan	S.Summerton	W.Snelling	L.Thomas	21
2019	Second	M.Lokan	C.Sutcliffe	J.Trengove	B.Frampton	32
2020	did not field a team due to the COVID-19 pandemic					
2021	Seventh	M.Lokan	C.Sutcliffe	S.Hayes	D.Williams	31
2022	Eighth	M.Lokan	C.Sutcliffe	C.Sutcliffe	D.Williams^{2}	20
2023	Fifth	T.Goldsack	C.Sutcliffe	N.Moore	C.Szust	22
2024🞭	Tenth	H.Hartlett	N.Moore	T.Clurey	T.Scully	20
2025	Sixth	H.Hartlett	N.Moore	J.Watkins	D.Williams^{3} J.Finlayson	21
2026🞭	Tenth	J.Surjan	J.McLennan	W.Lorenz	X.Walsh	23
⚑ = Premier 🞭 = Wooden Spoon ★ = Magarey Medallist ✪ = Ken Farmer Medallist^{2} = Multiple Best & Fairest or Leading Goalkicker

=== Hall of fame ===
Port Adelaide launched the club's hall of fame on 20 February 1998 when it inducted 18 inaugural members into the hall. It has since honoured more than 40 additional players, coaches, administrators and club servants who have played a major part in the club, in addition to multiple premiership teams and the executive board which handled acquiring an AFL license.

Port Adelaide
**Hall of Fame**
**Individuals**

Bruce Abernethy
**John Abley**
Dave Boyd
**Craig Bradley**
David Brown
Peter Burgoyne
**John Cahill**
Bob Clayton
Angelo Congear
Chad Cornes

Kane Cornes
Brian Cunningham
Leslie Dayman
Roger Delaney
**Russell Ebert**
Tim Evans
Brian Fairclough
George Fiacchi
Tim Ginever
Robbie Gray

Neville Hayes
Scott Hodges
Ron Hoffman
Sampson Hosking
Henry Kneebone
Marx Kretschmer
Brendon Lade
**Allan McLean**
Edward McMahon
**Geof Motley**

Paul Northeast
Peter Obst
Harold Oliver
**Greg Phillips**
Harold Phillips
Jeffrey Potter
**Bob Quinn**
Allan Reval
Llewellyn Roberts
Richard Russell

Darren Smith
Rohan Smith
Alf Trebilcock
**Warren Tredrea**
**Gavin Wanganeen**
Edward Whelan
**Fos Williams**
Mark Williams
Stephen Williams
Lloyd Zucker

**Eras**

1954–1959
1962–1965

1977
2004

**Administrative Teams**

1994 Board of Directors & CEO

Players listed in **bold** are inductees in the Australian Football Hall of Fame.
Players listed in **bold and italics** are legends in the Australian Football Hall of Fame.

=== Greatest Team ===
In June 2001, the Port Adelaide Football Club announced its 'Greatest Team' from the prior two centuries, consisting of the most successful players from the club. Between the 22 players inducted, they shared 201 premiership medals, 532 state games, 16 Magarey Medals and numerous other football accolades. The club hailed the group the "Greatest Team of the Greatest Club".

Port Adelaide Football Club: Greatest Team 1870–2000
B:	Richard Russell	John Abley	Edward Whelan
HB:	Neville Hayes	Greg Phillips	Geof Motley
C:	Craig Bradley	Russell Ebert	John Cahill
HF:	Dave Boyd	Les Dayman	Harold Oliver
F:	Scott Hodges	Tim Evans	Bob Quinn
Foll:	Russell Johnston	Fos Williams (c)	Allan Reval
Int:	Peter Woite	Lloyd Zucker	Jeff Potter
Int:	Harry Phillips		
Coach:	Fos Williams		

=== Military service ===
War Roll of Honour
Boer War
Kenneth McKenzie	William Schwann	John Shearer	
World War I
Maurice Allingham	Frederick Badcock	Arthur Biscombe	William Boon †
David Bower	Howard Bungey	Edward Callinan †	William Carr †
Hugh Challinder	Arnold Channon	Albert Chaplin †	Robert Coffen
Henry Davis	Clement Dayman	William Dempster	Henry Dewar
William 'Roy' Drummond M.M.	Edward Foggo	Archibald Gosling †	Matthew Healy
Horace Hoare	Samuel Howie	Gordon Inkster	Clarence Latimer
Lawrence Levy	William Marshall	Tom McDonald D.C.M	Frederick Meadows
Edward Oatey	John W. Robertson	Edwin Rose	Thomas Sard
Stedman Stidson	William Theodore	Harry Tobin	Arthur Tubel
Arthur Turner	Douglas Walsh M.C.†	Joseph Watson †	Edward Weeden
John Woollard			
World War I – officials
Dr Alexander Benson	Charles Hayter	Dr Edward Morris	
World War II
Howard Abbott	James Allingham	Charles A. Andersen	Charles H. Andersen
Basil Bampton	Harold Beer	Halcombe George Brock †	Maxwell Carmichael †
George W.F. Chapman	Clarence Christensen	Noel Clark	John Coppin
Ivor Dangerfield	Lindsay Darling	Ralph Dawe	Clarance L. Dayman
John Dermody	Edward Dorian	James Doyle	Drozena Eden
Bert Edwards	James Farr	Dennis Fitzgerald	Frederick Galliford
Laurence Gates	Geoffrey Germein	Francis Gibaut	Arthur Gower
Colin Grant	Claude Greening	Donald Gregg	Colin Grimm
John Heaton	Colin Herbert	John Johnson	Kenneth Johnson
Christopher Johnston †	Clyde Kellaway	Peter Keough	Lyall Kretschmer
Robert Lander	Louis Mangan	Peter Marrett	Richard Mayne
Harold McDonald	Norman McInnes	Malcolm McKiggan †	Allan R.C. 'Bob' McLean
Leslie A.G. McLean	Harold Mills	Brian Moore	George Neaylon
John Oehme	William Owens	Alexander Pender	Harry Perry
Frederick Peters	James Prideaux	George U. Quinn †	John M. Quinn
Robert B. Quinn M.M.	Lew Roberts	Herbert Robertson	Bertram Robinson
Lloyd Rudd †	Leonard Salvemini	Reginald Schumann	John Skelley
Kenneth Slade	Gordon Temby	William Trigg	Arthur Tunbridge
Arthur Utting	John Wade †	Hercules Waldron	John White
Geoffrey Wiese	Foster Williams	John Woollard	
World War II – officials/staff
Kenneth Aubert	Archibald Dowsett	Henry Naismith	William Adair
Raymond Haskard			
Vietnam War
Peter Chant †	John Fletcher	Lindsay McGie	Roger Nettle
John A. Quinn			
† denotes killed in action or died while serving
