= 1953 SANFL Grand Final =

West Torrens	Port Adelaide
9.13 (67)	8.12 (60)
	1	2	3	4
WT	3.3 (21)	6.8 (44)	7.10 (52)	9.13 (67)
PTA	4.3 (27)	6.7 (43)	8.10 (58)	8.12 (60)
- Date: Saturday, 3 October (2:10 pm)
- Stadium: Adelaide Oval
- Attendance: 42,949

Accolades
- Best on Ground: Mick Clingly

The 1953 SANFL Grand Final was an Australian rules football competition. West Torrens beat Port Adelaide 67 to 60. It was West Torrens' final premiership and Grand Final appearance as a stand-alone team before merging with Woodville in 1990.
