= 1980 SANFL Grand Final =

Port Adelaide	Norwood
11.15 (81)	9.9 (63)
	1	2	3	4
PA	3.1 (19)	5.7 (37)	6.11 (47)	11.15 (81)
NOR	4.3 (27)	5.6 (36)	7.9 (51)	9.9 (63)
- Date: Saturday, 4 October (2:10 pm)
- Stadium: Football Park
- Attendance: 54,536

The 1980 SANFL Grand Final was an Australian rules football competition. Port Adelaide beat Norwood by 81 to 63.
