= James Hodge (administrator) =

- Born: 1876
- Died: 10 September 1931
- Occupations: Secretary of the Port Adelaide Football Club; Manager Lion Timber Mills Port Adelaide

James Hodge (1876–1931) was the secretary of the Port Adelaide Football Club from 1906 to 1915.

== "Columbus" ==
He was nicknamed 'Columbus' after Christopher Columbus due to his efforts of taking Port Adelaide all over Australia during his tenure as club secretary. During Hodge's time as secretary the club played exhibition matches in Kalgoorlie, Perth, Fremantle, Hobart, Devonport, Melbourne, Bendigo, Ballarat, Sydney, Albury, Wagga Wagga and Broken Hill.
