= Matthew Richardson (administrator) =

Matthew Richardson is an Australian rules football administrator. He was the CEO for the Port Adelaide Football Club SANFL operations from 2004 to 2009. At the end of the 2020 AFL season, Richardson was appointed the CEO of the Port Adelaide Football Club, which by this stage had seen its operations in the AFL and SANFL reunited.
