= 1938 SANFL Grand Final =

- Official program cover.

South Adelaide	Port Adelaide
23.14 (152)	15.16 (106)
	1	2	3	4
STH	6.3 (39)	9.5 (59)	21.9 (135)	23.14 (152)
PTA	4.3 (27)	9.5 (59)	11.8 (74)	15.16 (106)
- Date: Saturday, 1 October (2:10 pm)
- Stadium: Adelaide Oval
- Attendance: 33,364

The 1938 SANFL Grand Final was an Australian rules football competition. South Adelaide beat Port Adelaide 152 to 106.
