= 1901 SAFA Grand Final =

| Norwood | Port Adelaide |
|---|---|
| 4.9 (33) | 4.5 (29) |
| | 1 | 2 | 3 | 4 |
|---|---|---|---|---|
| NOR | 1.1 (7) | 1.3 (9) | 4.5 (29) | 4.9 (33) |
| PTA | 2.1 (13) | 2.2 (14) | 2.5 (17) | 4.5 (29) |
- Date: Saturday 5 October (2:45 pm)
- Stadium: Adelaide Oval
- Attendance: 7,000

The 1901 SAFA Grand Final was the concluding championship match of the 1901 SAFA season. The game resulted in a victory for Norwood who beat Port Adelaide by four points.
