= 1936 SANFL Grand Final =

Port Adelaide	Sturt
13.19 (97)	14.10 (94)
	1	2	3	4
PTA	2.2 (14)	6.8 (44)	10.16 (76)	13.19 (97)
STU	6.3 (39)	11.6 (72)	12.8 (80)	14.10 (94)
- Date: Saturday, 3 October (2:10 pm)
- Stadium: Adelaide Oval
- Attendance: 35,120

The 1936 SANFL Grand Final was an Australian rules football competition. Port Adelaide beat Sturt 97 to 94.
