= Maurice Allingham =

Australian rules footballer

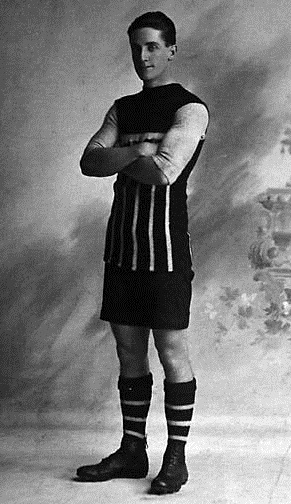

Personal information
- Full name: Maurice William Allingham
- Nickname: Maurie
- Born: 19 August 1896; Glanville, South Australia
- Died: 15 September 1993 (aged 97)
- Position: Forward

Playing career^{1}
Years	Club	Games (Goals)
1920–1931	Port Adelaide	158 (166)
- ^{1} Playing statistics correct to the end of 1931.

Career highlights
- Port Adelaide premiership player (1928); Port Adelaide best and fairest (1931); 4× Port Adelaide leading goalkicker (1921, 1922, 1923, 1924)

Maurice William Allingham (19 August 1896 – 15 September 1993) was an Australian rules footballer from South Australia. He was the Port Adelaide Football Club's leading goal kicker on four occasions and won the club's best and fairest in 1931. He enlisted for duty during World War I on 16 February 1917 and was part of the 5th Machine Gun Battalion. He returned to Australia on 5 July 1919 and was awarded the British War Medal and Victory Medal for his duties.
