= 1937 SANFL Grand Final =

Australian rules football competition

Port Adelaide	South Adelaide
13.16 (94)	9.16 (70)
	1	2	3	4
PTA	3.6 (24)	5.7 (37)	8.10 (58)	13.16 (94)
STH	0.3 (3)	3.12 (30)	6.13 (49)	9.16 (70)
- Date: Saturday, 2 October (2:10 pm)
- Stadium: Adelaide Oval
- Attendance: 35,895

The 1937 SANFL Grand Final was an Australian rules football competition. Port Adelaide beat South Adelaide 94 to 70.
