= Sammy Lunn =

South Australian fundraiser and philanthropist (1864-1923)

Sammy Lunn MBE
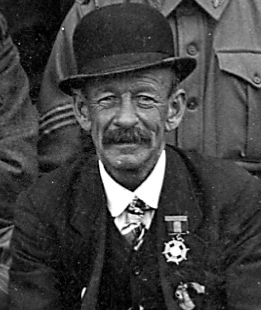
- Born: 1864; Dover, United Kingdom
- Died: 16 May 1923; Adelaide, South Australia
- Other name: "The Digger's Pal"

Sammy Lunn (1864-1923) was a South Australian fundraiser and philanthropist who was acclaimed in his state as a fundraiser for Australian Service-men who served during World War I. Lunn was also an active member of the Port Adelaide Football Club.

The hearse carrying Sammy Lunn during his funeral procession on King William Street pictured out the front of the Adelaide Town Hall in 1923.

Lunn was a business man who operated as an ice cream vendor. Lunn would often sell ice cream from his van in the beachside suburb of Semaphore.

In 1920 Lunn was awarded an M.B.E. in recognition of his support of Australian service-men. An example of his support included providing 12,000 Digger with five shillings deriving from his fund-raising efforts.

Lunn would attend SANFL football matches as part of his fundraising efforts, in particular for Port Adelaide where he wore that team's lace-up guernsey and shouted rhymes and parodies to the amusement of spectators.

When he died, many shops in South Australia closed during his funeral procession.

== Publications ==
- Bell, Clarrie (1990) 'Sammy Lunn (1865-1923): The Diggers' Pal' Historical Society of Woodville
- Lunn, Samuel (1914) 'The War Fund' Scrymgour & Sons.
