= 1944 SANFL Grand Final =

Norwood–North	Port–Torrens
9.7 (61)	7.13 (55)
	1	2	3	4
NNA	4.4 (28)	8.5 (53)	8.5 (53)	9.7 (61)
PWT	2.3 (15)	6.7 (43)	7.10 (52)	7.13 (55)
- Date: Saturday, 30 September (2:10 pm)
- Stadium: Adelaide Oval
- Attendance: 30,000

The 1944 SANFL Grand Final was an Australian rules football championship game. It was held during World War II and was contested between merged clubs. Norwood-North beat Port–Torrens 61 to 55.
