= Dick Russell (footballer) =

Australian rules footballer

Richard Russell

Personal information
- Full name: Richard Lowell Russell
- Nicknames: Dick, The Rock
- Born: 11 May 1922; Port Augusta, South Australia
- Died: 24 January 1974 (aged 51)
- Position: Back Pocket

Playing career^{1}
Years	Club	Games (Goals)
1947–1953	Port Adelaide	121 (1)

Representative team honours
Years	Team	Games (Goals)
1948–1953	South Australia	18 (0)
- ^{1} Playing statistics correct to the end of 1953.

Career highlights
- Club: Port Adelaide premiership player (1951); 3× Port Adelaide best & fairest (1948, 1949, 1951); Representative: Sporting Life team of the year (1950); 18 games for South Australia; Honours: Port Adelaide's greatest team (half-back flank)

Richard Lowell Russell (11 May 1922 – 24 January 1974) was an Australian rules footballer who played for Port Adelaide in the South Australian National Football League (SANFL).

== Early years ==
Russell was born in the seaside town of Port Augusta, South Australia.

== Military service ==
Russell enlisted in the army on 9 July 1942 and was discharged on 7 August 1946.

== Football ==
Due to his war commitments Russell made his debut for Port Adelaide at the relatively late age of 25. After his debut season he would represent South Australia in interstate football every year for the remainder of his career. During the 1950 Brisbane Carnival, Richard's performances in the back pocket for South Australia gained him a spot in the Sporting Life team, a forerunner to the modern All-Australian team concept. He would win his only premiership during the 1951 SANFL season.
