= Greg Boulton =

Australian rules football administrator

Gregory Colin Boulton AM BA is a former Australian rules football administrator with the Port Adelaide Football Club.

Greg Boulton was president of Port Adelaide Football Club from 1992 to 2008. He played an integral part in completing Bruce Weber's goal of transitioning Port Adelaide from an SANFL club to an AFL club. He oversaw the period during which Port Adelaide won five SANFL premierships and one AFL premiership.

Boulton was awarded a Centenary Medal on 1 January 2001 "For service to the community through the Australian Football League in South Australia'. In the 2010 Australia Day Honours Boulton was appointed Member of the Order of Australia (AM) "For service to Australian Rules football administration, to the community of South Australia, and to business".
