= 1935 SANFL Grand Final =

Port Adelaide	South Adelaide
13.13 (91)	15.9 (99)
	1	2	3	4
PTA	2.3 (15)	8.4 (54)	10.8 (68)	13.13 (91)
STH	5.1 (31)	10.3 (63)	14.7 (91)	15.9 (99)
- Date: Saturday, 5 October (2:10 pm)
- Stadium: Adelaide Oval
- Attendance: 26,496

The 1935 SANFL Grand Final was an Australian rules football competition. South Adelaide beat Port Adelaide 99 to 91.
