= 1943 SANFL Grand Final =

Norwood–North	Port–Torrens
12.10 (82)	8.13 (61)
	1	2	3	4
NNA	3.1 (19)	6.7 (43)	7.9 (51)	12.10 (82)
PWT	3.6 (24)	3.6 (24)	7.9 (52)	8.13 (61)
- Date: Saturday, 30 September (2:10 pm)
- Stadium: Adelaide Oval
- Attendance: 42,000

The 1943 SANFL Grand Final was an Australian rules football championship game. It was held during World War II and was contested between merged clubs. Norwood-North beat Port–Torrens 82 to 61.
