= Alan Shiell =

Australian cricketer (born 1945)

Personal information
- Born: 25 April 1945 (age 81); Adelaide, Australia
- Source: Cricinfo, 25 September 2020

Alan Shiell (born 25 April 1945) is a former Australian cricketer and newspaper reporter. He played in twenty-three first-class matches for South Australia between 1964 and 1967 but retired from an active cricket career he was twenty four. He then became a cricket reporter for The Advertiser in Adelaide, but later joined the also Adelaide-based The News. He is credited with having revealed the emergence of the World Series Cricket in 1977.

== See also ==
- List of South Australian representative cricketers

== Sources ==
- Sexton, M. (2017) Chappell's Last Stand, Affirm Press: Melbourne. ISBN 9781925584424
