= 1928 SANFL Grand Final =

Norwood	Port Adelaide
7.14 (56)	15.14 (104)
	1	2	3	4
NOR	3.2 (20)	4.7 (27)	5.9 (39)	7.14 (56)
PTA	5.5 (35)	7.8 (50)	10.10 (70)	15.14 (104)
- Date: Saturday, 6 October (2:10 pm)
- Stadium: Adelaide Oval
- Attendance: 35,700

The 1928 SANFL Grand Final was an Australian rules football competition. Port Adelaide beat Norwood 104 to 56.
