= Archibald Hosie =

Australian rules footballer

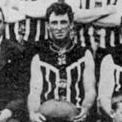

Personal information
- Full name: Archibald Hosie
- Nickname: Arch
- Born: 22 August 1873; Port Adelaide, South Australia
- Died: 21 April 1953 (aged 79); Queenstown, South Australia
- Position: Utility

Playing career
Years	Club	Games (Goals)
1890–1904	Port Adelaide	183

Representative team honours
Years	Team	Games (Goals)
1899–1902	South Australia	6

Coaching career
Years	Club	Games (W–L–D)
1909–1910	Port Adelaide	30 (23–7–0)
1924–1925	Port Adelaide	30 (19–11–0)
Total		60 (42–18–0)

Career highlights
- South Australia state captain (1901–1902); 2× Port Adelaide premiership player (1897, 1903); Port Adelaide premiership coach (1910); Port Adelaide best and fairest (1898); Port Adelaide captain (1901–1904)

Archibald Hosie (22 August 1873 – 21 April 1953) was an Australian rules footballer and coach for the Port Adelaide Football Club in the South Australian Football Association.

In 1902, Archibald Hosie captained South Australia to a win over Victoria on the Melbourne Cricket Ground.
