= List of Port Adelaide Football Club records and statistics =

Australian rules football club statistics

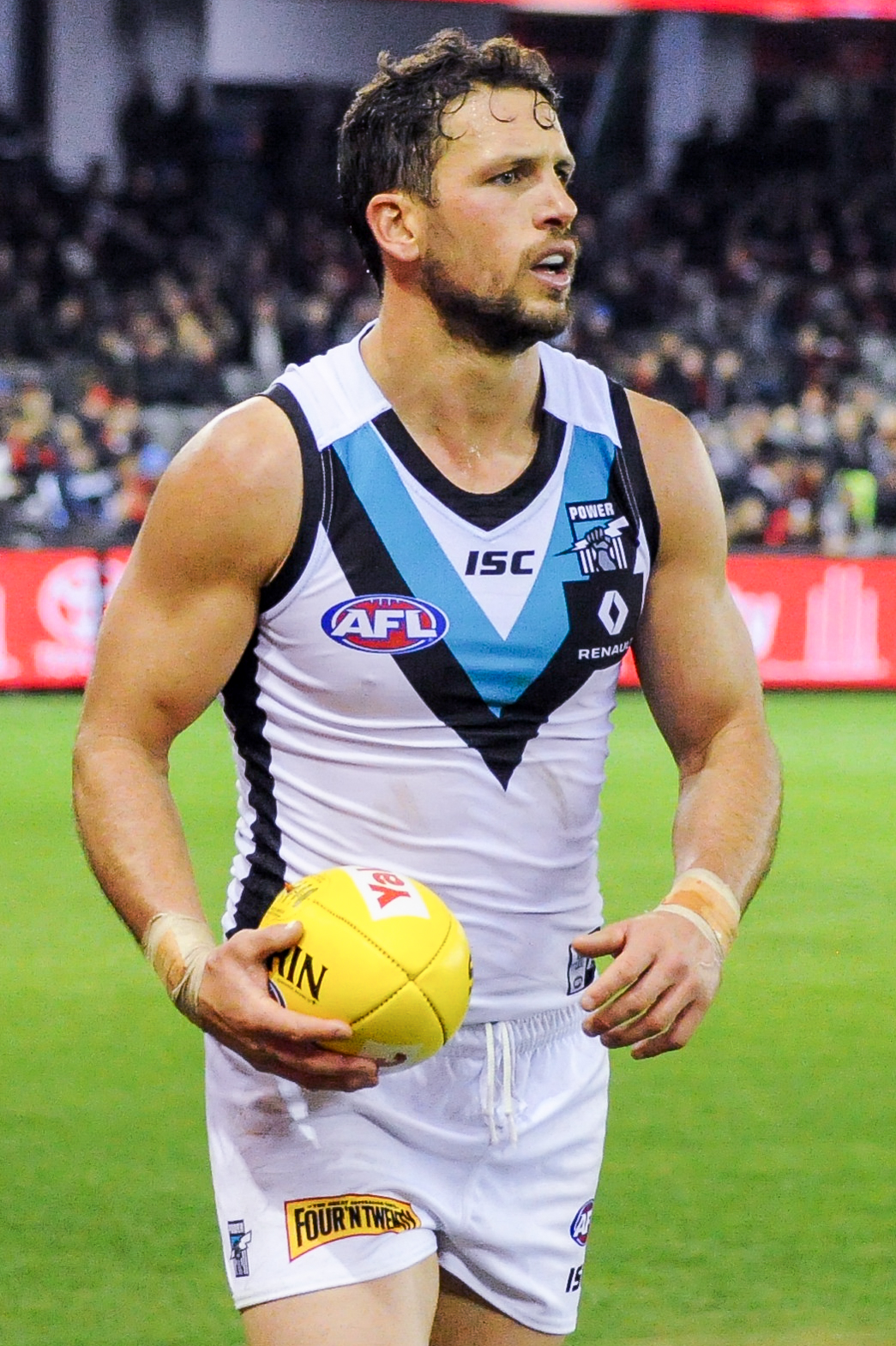
Travis Boak holds the record for most games played for Port Adelaide with 408.

Port Adelaide Football Club is a professional Australian rules football club based in Alberton, South Australia. The club's senior men's team plays in the Australian Football League (AFL), while its reserves men's team competes in the South Australian National Football League (SANFL). The club was a founding member of the South Australian Football Association (SAFA), later renamed the SANFL, and later joined the AFL in 1997.

This list encompasses the major honours won by Port Adelaide and its players, and records set by the club, its managers and its players across both SANFL and AFL competitions. The individual records section includes details on the club's leading goalscorers, multiple-premiership winning players and coaches, and those who have made the most appearances as both player and coach in senior competition.

The club has won a record thirty-six SANFL premierships and one AFL premiership, and in addition to four Championship of Australia titles. The club's games record holder is Travis Boak with 408, whilst the SANFL games record holder is Russell Ebert with 392. Tim Evans is the club's record goalscorer, scoring 1041 goals across his career.

All statistics are correct as of 19 March 2026.

== Club honours ==
Port Adelaide is one of the most successful clubs in senior level football, having won a combined 37 senior premierships across both the AFL and SANFL competitions. The club won its first premiership in 1884, while its thirty-seventh and most recent senior level premiership was in 2004.

The club has seen two notable sustained periods of success during its existence. The first came under the leadership of Fos Williams, who coached the club to 9 senior premierships, including a span of five consecutive premierships. The second came under John Cahill, who coached the club to an equal-record 10 senior premierships in the SANFL.

The club has won a record four Championship of Australia titles, and won the Stanley H. Lewis trophy 12 times, second to only Norwood (14).

Club Achievements
Competition	Level	Wins	Years won
Premierships
Australian Football League	Seniors	1	2004
South Australian National Football League	Seniors (1877–2013); Reserves (2014–present)	36	1884, 1890, 1897, 1903, 1906, 1910, 1913, 1914, 1921, 1928, 1936, 1937, 1939, 1951, 1954, 1955, 1956, 1957, 1958, 1959, 1962, 1963, 1965, 1977, 1979, 1980, 1981, 1988, 1989, 1990, 1992, 1994, 1995, 1996, 1998, 1999
South Australian National Football League	Reserves (1906–2018)	19	1911, 1923, 1933, 1936, 1947, 1948, 1952, 1955, 1956, 1957, 1958, 1959, 1963, 1980, 1983, 1988, 1996, 1997, 2010
South Australian National Football League	Under 19s (1937–2008)	13	1946, 1950, 1953, 1962, 1974, 1975, 1976, 1977, 1991, 1999, 2001, 2006, 2007
South Australian National Football League	Under 17s (1939–2008)	6	1951, 1955, 1961, 1971, 1972, 1994
South Australian National Football League	Under 18s (2009–2014)	1	2011
South Australian National Football League	War League (1942–1944)	1	1942 (Note: Won the 1942 premiership as a merged team with West Torrens. The league merged all clubs during the Second World War.)
South Australian Patriotic Football League	Seniors (1916–1918)	2	1916, 1917
Other titles and honours
Championship of Australia	Seniors	4	1890, 1910, 1913, 1914
Stanley H Lewis Memorial Trophy (1962–2014)	Multiple	12	1962, 1963, 1964, 1970, 1977, 1979, 1980, 1988, 1989, 1992, 1994, 1999
AFL pre-season competition	Seniors	2	2001, 2002
SANFL Lightning Premiership	Seniors	1	1948
Finishing positions
Australian Football League	Minor premiership	4	2002, 2003, 2004, 2020
Australian Football League	Runners Up	1	2007
Australian Football League	Wooden spoons	0	Nil
South Australian National Football League	Minor premiership	44	1889, 1902, 1903, 1904, 1906, 1907, 1909, 1911, 1912, 1913, 1914, 1915, 1921, 1928, 1931, 1934, 1935, 1936, 1939, 1940, 1945, 1951, 1953, 1954, 1955, 1956, 1957, 1959, 1960, 1961, 1962, 1964, 1965, 1970, 1976, 1977, 1980, 1982, 1984, 1988, 1990, 1992, 1999, 2014
South Australian National Football League	Runners Up	37	1878, 1879, 1883, 1887, 1888, 1889, 1891, 1892, 1898, 1901, 1904, 1905, 1907, 1909, 1911, 1912, 1915, 1929, 1930, 1934, 1935, 1938, 1945, 1946, 1953, 1964, 1966, 1967, 1968, 1971, 1972, 1976, 1984, 1997, 2014, 2017, 2019
South Australian National Football League	Wooden spoons	4	1886, 1896, 1900, 2024

== Player honours ==
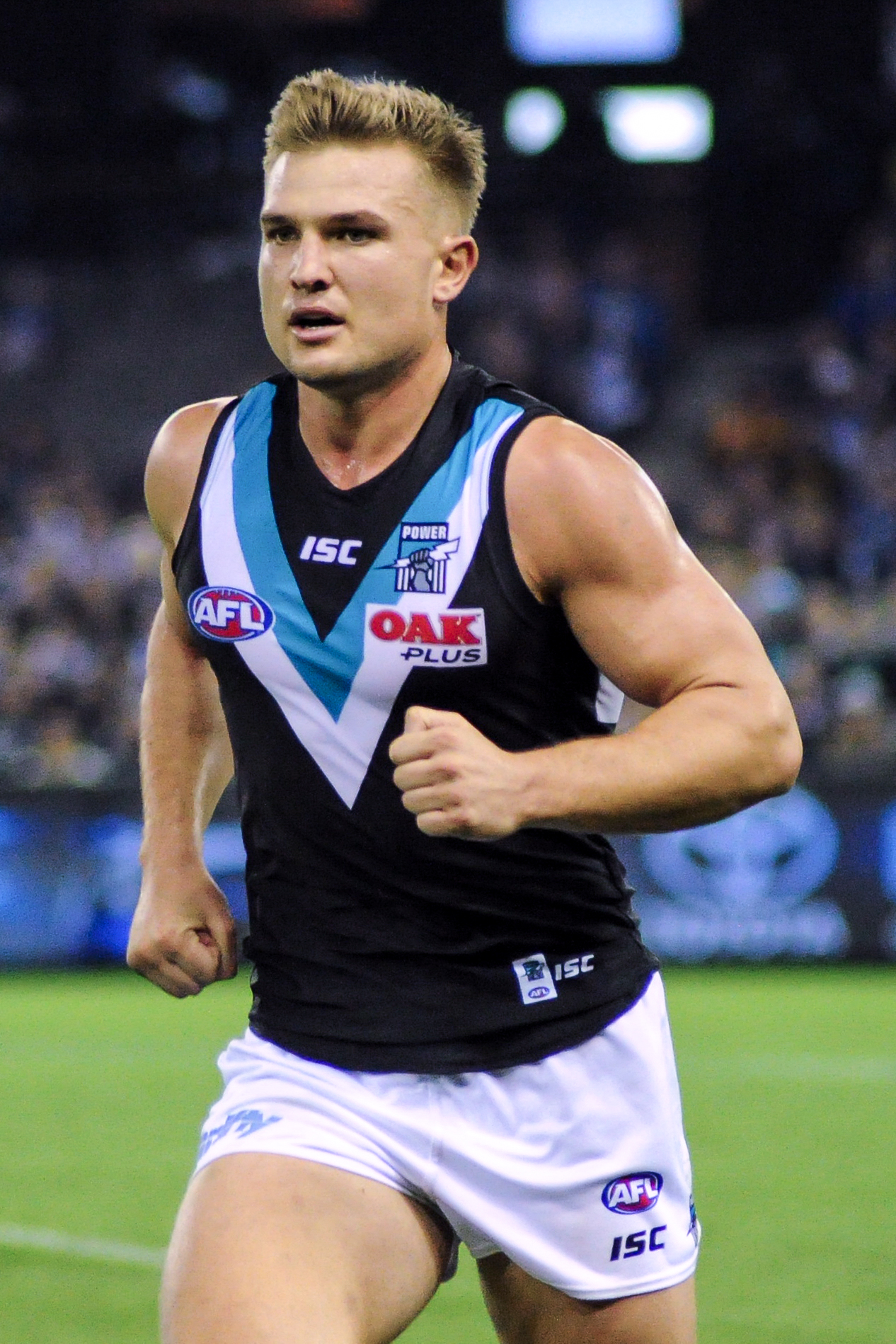
Ollie Wines became the club's first Brownlow Medallist in 2021.

=== Competition awards ===
Brownlow Medal (AFL best and fairest)

- 2021 – Ollie Wines

Magarey Medal (SANFL best and fairest)

- 1899 – Stan Malin
- 1907 – Jack Mack
- 1910 – Sampson Hosking
- 1914 – Jack Ashley
- 1915 – Sampson Hosking
- 1921 – Charlie Adams
- 1925 – Peter Bampton
- 1938 – Bob Quinn
- 1945 – Bob Quinn
- 1956 – Dave Boyd
- 1964 – Geof Motley
- 1967 – Trevor Obst
- 1971 – Russell Ebert
- 1974 – Russell Ebert
- 1975 – Peter Woite
- 1976 – Russell Ebert
- 1980 – Russell Ebert
- 1986 – Greg Anderson
- 1990 – Scott Hodges
- 1992 – Nathan Buckley
- 2001 – Tony Brown and Ryan O'Connor
- 2003 – Brett Ebert
- 2005 – Jeremy Clayton

AFLCA Champion Player of the Year

- 2004 – Warren Tredrea
- 2014 – Robbie Gray
- 2023 - Zak Butters

AFL Rising Star (Best player under 21)

- 1997 – Michael Wilson
- 2006 – Danyle Pearce

=== Grand final best on ground awards ===
Norm Smith Medal (AFL)

- 2004 – Byron Pickett

Jack Oatey Medal (SANFL)

- 1981 – Russell Ebert
- 1988 – Bruce Abernethy
- 1989 – Russell Johnston
- 1990 – George Fiacchi
- 1992 – Nathan Buckley
- 1994 – Darryl Wakelin
- 1995 – Anthony Darcy
- 1996 – David Brown
- 1998 – Brett Chalmers
- 1999 – Darryl Poole

=== Club awards ===
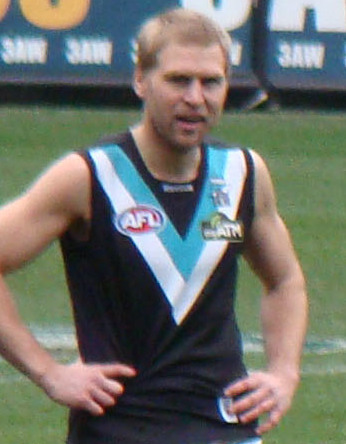
Kane Cornes has won the most John Cahill Medals, with four.

John Cahill Medal

The John Cahill Medal is a medal awarded to the club's best performing AFL player each year. It was introduced as a successor to Port Adelaide's best and fairest award handed out from 1870 to 1996.

- 1997 – Darren Mead
- 1998 – Adam Kingsley
- 1999 – Stephen Paxman
- 2000 – Brett Montgomery
- 2001 – Warren Tredrea
- 2002 – Matthew Primus
- 2003 – Gavin Wanganeen
- 2004 – Warren Tredrea
- 2005 – Warren Tredrea
- 2006 – Brendon Lade
- 2007 – Kane Cornes
- 2008 – Kane Cornes
- 2009 – Warren Tredrea
- 2010 – Kane Cornes
- 2011 – Travis Boak
  Jackson Trengove
- 2012 – Kane Cornes
- 2013 – Chad Wingard
- 2014 – Robbie Gray
- 2015 – Robbie Gray
- 2016 – Robbie Gray
- 2017 – Paddy Ryder
- 2018 – Justin Westhoff
- 2019 – Travis Boak
- 2020 – Darcy Byrne-Jones
- 2021 – Ollie Wines
- 2022 – Connor Rozee
- 2023 – Zak Butters
- 2024 – Zak Butters
- 2025 – Zak Butters

Allan Robert McLean Medal

The Allan Robert McLean Medal is a medal awarded to the club's best performing SANFL player each year.

- 1986 – Martin Leslie
- 1987 – Bruce Abernethy
- 1988 – Greg Phillips
- 1989 – Russell Johnston
- 1990 – Scott Hodges
- 1991 – Paul Northeast
- 1992 – Nathan Buckley
- 1993 – Troy Bond
- 1994 – Tim Ginever
- 1995 – Robbie West
- 1996 – Scott Hodges
- 1997 – Tim Ginever
- 1998 – Bryan Beinke
- 1999 – Darryl Poole
- 2000 – Phil McGuinness
- 2001 – Ryan O'Connor
- 2002 – Corey Ah Chee
- 2003 – Brett Ebert
- 2004 – Kristian DePasquale
- 2005 – Jeremy Clayton
- 2006 – Jeremy Clayton
- 2007 – Jeremy Clayton
- 2008 – Jeremy Clayton
- 2009 – Brad Murray
- 2010 – Steven Summerton
- 2011 – Mark Dolling
- 2012 – Jeremy Clayton
- 2013 – Sam Gray
- 2014 – Steven Summerton
- 2015 – Steven Summerton
- 2016 – Kane Mitchell
- 2017 – Brendon Ah Chee
- 2018 – Will Snelling
- 2019 – Jack Trengove
- 2021 – Sam Hayes
- 2022 – Cam Sutcliffe
- 2023 – Nick Moore
- 2024 – Tom Clurey
- 2025 – Jack Watkins

=== All-Australian ===
An All-Australian team is considered a 'best-of' selection of players for each calendar year, with each player represented in their team position. Each team is selected by a panel of experts.

==== Sporting Life's All Australian ====
Bob Quinn was named as captain in Sporting Life's All-Australian.

Sporting Life Magazine first pioneered the concept of an All-Australian 'team of the year' in 1947, and would run each year until 1955. The AFL does not recognise the teams selected by Sporting Life.

- Bob Quinn – 1947 (captain)
- Dick Russell – 1950
- Fos Williams – 1950, 1951
- Harold McDonald – 1951, 1955

==== Official ====
All Australian teams from the Interstate Carnivals and Australian Football League have been endorsed as official by governing bodies of the sport, such as the Australian National Football Council and the AFL.

Interstate carnivals

- John Abley – 1956, 1958, 1961
- John Cahill – 1969
- Greg Phillips – 1980
- Mark Williams – 1980
- Craig Bradley – 1983, 1985
- Tony Giles – 1983
- Stephen Curtis – 1983
- Greg Anderson – 1987
- Martin Leslie – 1988

Australian Football League

- Adam Heuskes – 1997
- Gavin Wanganeen – 2001, 2003
- Matthew Primus – 2001, 2002
- Warren Tredrea – 2001, 2002, 2003, 2004
- Brett Montgomery – 2002
- Josh Francou – 2002
- Chad Cornes – 2004, 2007
- Mark Williams – 2004 (coach)
- Kane Cornes – 2005, 2007
- Brendon Lade – 2006, 2007
- Shaun Burgoyne – 2006
- Chad Wingard – 2013, 2015
- Travis Boak – 2013, 2014, 2020 (VC)
- Robbie Gray – 2014, 2015, 2017, 2018
- Paddy Ryder – 2017
- Darcy Byrne-Jones – 2020
- Charlie Dixon – 2020
- Aliir Aliir – 2021
- Ollie Wines – 2021
- Connor Rozee – 2022, 2023
- Zak Butters – 2023, 2024
- Dan Houston – 2023, 2024

=== Australian Football Hall of Fame ===
The Australian Football Hall of Fame was established in 1996 to recognise and celebrated members of the Australian rules football community who had made notable contributions to the sport. All nominees are required to have retired prior to nomination, with a stipulation on former players requiring them to have been retired for at least 10 years. All inductees are selected by the AFL Hall of Fame committee, with a maximum of 8 inductees per year.

Hall of Fame inductees

- Bob Quinn – 1996
- Fos Williams – 1996
- Geof Motley – 2002
- John Cahill – 2002
- Craig Bradley – 2006
- Bob McLean – 2007
- Gavin Wanganeen – 2010
- Nathan Buckley – 2011
- Andrew McLeod – 2014
- Warren Tredrea – 2014
- John Abley – 2020
- Greg Phillips – 2020
- Mark Williams – 2023

AFL Hall of Fame Legend

The highest status attainable to a Hall of Fame inductee is 'Legend' status. 'Legend' status is awarded to former players and coaches who have made significant contributions to the sport that have substantially improved the game.

- Haydn Bunton Sr. – 1996
- Russell Ebert – 2022

== Club records ==
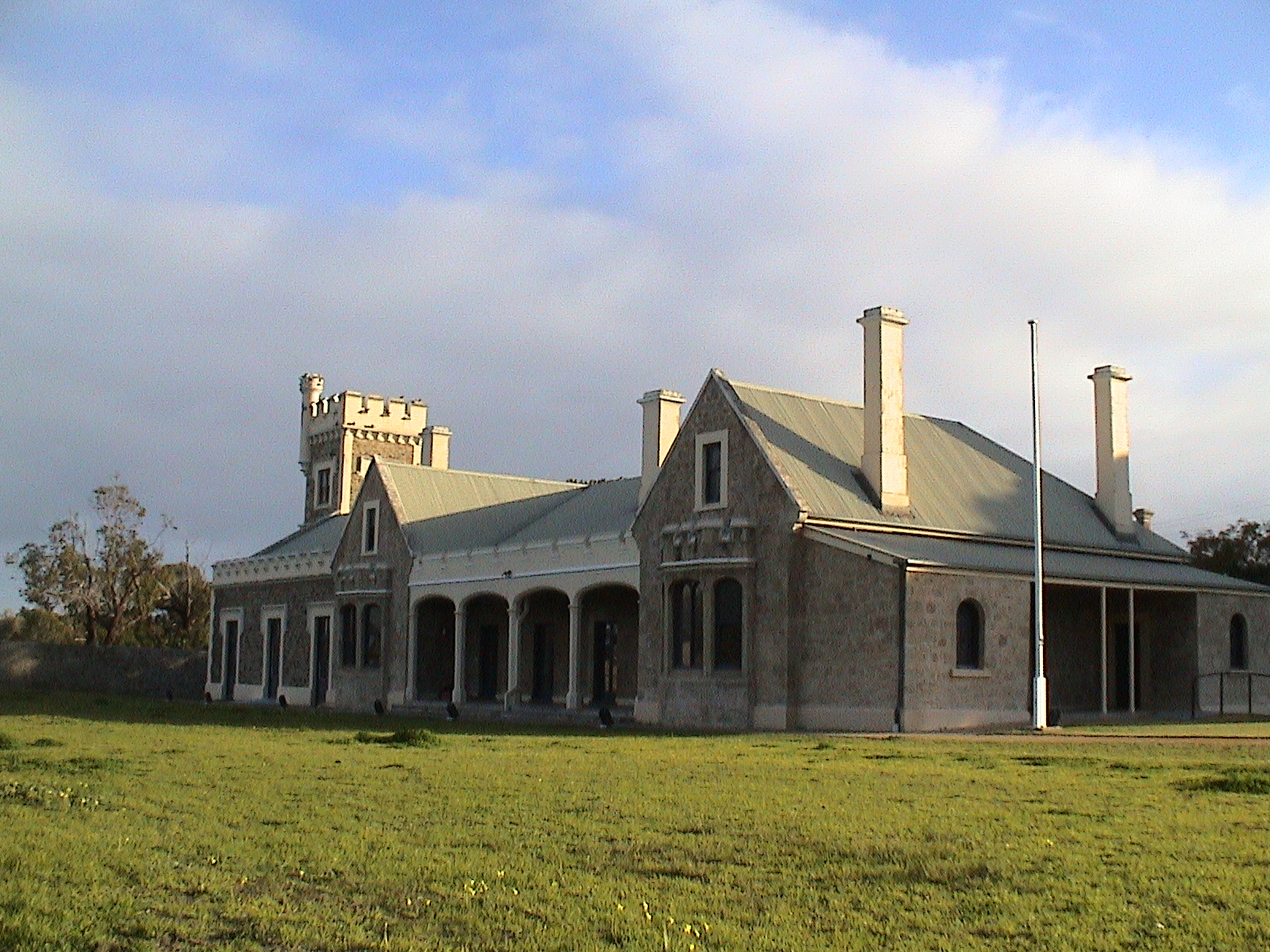
Glanville Hall Estate was the home of the first match played by Port Adelaide. The estate was owned by club president John Hart Jr.

=== Firsts ===
- First Game: Young Australian 1-1 Port Adelaide, 28 July 1870
- First SANFL Match: Kensington 0-3 Port Adelaide, 12 May 1877
- First AFL Match: Collingwood 26.10 (166) def. Port Adelaide 13.9 (87)
- First Win: Port Adelaide 1-0 Kensington, 23 August 1873
- First AFL Win: Port Adelaide 18.21 (129) def. Geelong 14.6 (90)

=== Game records ===
==== Biggest wins ====
AFL

Rank	Margin	Opponent	Year	Round	Venue	Ref
1	117	Hawthorn	2005	13	Football Park	
2	115	Gold Coast	2017	23	Adelaide Oval	
3	113	Brisbane	2014	4	Adelaide Oval	
4	112	Sydney	2024	22	Adelaide Oval	
4	112	West Coast	2001	22	Football Park	

SANFL

Rank	Margin	Opponent	Year	Round	Venue	Ref
1	169	Woodville	1970	17	Woodville Oval	
2	161	Woodville	1980	3	Football Park	
2	161	Central District	1976	11	Football Park	
4	160	West Adelaide	1903	14	Alberton Oval	
5	159	South Adelaide	1988	16	Alberton Oval	

==== Biggest losses ====
AFL

Rank	Margin	Opponent	Year	Round	Venue	Ref
1	165	Hawthorn	2011	21	M.C.G.	
2	138	Collingwood	2011	20	Football Park	
3	119	Geelong	2007	GF	M.C.G.	
4	117	West Coast	2005	10	Subiaco Oval	
5	98	Adelaide	2025	21	Adelaide Oval	

SANFL

Rank	Margin	Opponent	Year	Round	Venue	Ref
1	126	North Adelaide	2022	13	Prospect Oval	
2	122	Norwood	1997	5	Adelaide Oval	
3	117	Norwood	2002	16	Norwood Oval	
4	114	Sturt	1983	5	Football Park	
5	112	Norwood	1982	5	Norwood Oval	

==== Highest score ====
AFL

Rank	Score	Opponent	Year	Round	Venue	Ref
1	29.14 (188)	Hawthorn	2005	13	Football Park	
2	25.23 (174)	Brisbane	2016	19	Gabba	
3	26.15 (171)	Hawthorn	2004	3	Football Park	
4	25.15 (165)	Carlton	1998	7	Princes Park	
5	26.8 (164)	North Melbourne	2005	EF	Docklands	

SANFL

Rank	Score	Opponent	Year	Round	Venue	Ref
1	37.21 (243)	Woodville	1986	11	Football Park	
2	35.16 (226)	Central District	1976	11	Football Park	
3	34.18 (222)	Sturt	1990	18	Adelaide Oval	
3	33.24 (222)	South Adelaide	1988	16	Alberton Oval	
5	33.19 (217)	Glenelg	1934	3	Alberton Oval	
5	34.13 (217)	Woodville	1981	16	Alberton Oval	

==== Lowest score ====
AFL

Rank	Score	Opponent	Year	Round	Venue	Ref
1	3.3 (21)	Collingwood	1900	20	Football Park	
2	3.12 (30)	Richmond	1900	10	Football Park	
3	4.7 (31)	Geelong	1909	12	Carrara Stadium	
4	4.8 (32)	Richmond	1899	11	Football Park	
4	5.2 (32)	Hawthorn	1900	21	M.C.G.	

SANFL

Rank	Score	Opponent	Year	Round	Venue	Ref
1	1.1 (7)	North Adelaide	1900	1	Alberton Oval	
2	1.2 (8)	Norwood	1900	9	Adelaide Oval	
3	1.4 (10)	Norwood	1909	3	Alberton Oval	
3	1.4 (10)	South Adelaide	1899	17	Adelaide Oval	
3	1.4 (10)	North Adelaide	2022	13	Prospect Oval	

==== Biggest comebacks ====
AFL

Rank	Largest Deficit	Opponent	Year	Round	Venue	Ref
1	41	Hawthorn	2024	11	Adelaide Oval	
1	41	West Coast	2013	5	Football Park	
3	40	Western Bulldogs	1997	12	Princes Park	
4	39	West Coast	2000	14	Subiaco Oval	
5	37	Adelaide	2001	18	Football Park	

=== Season records ===
==== Most season wins ====
- AFL – 20 wins (2004)
- SANFL – 21 wins (Note: This record is unbreakable under the current SANFL fixturing rules (current maximum is 20 wins: 18 home-and-away plus two finals).) (1980, 1989)

==== Fewest season losses ====
- AFL – 4 losses (2020)
- SANFL – 0 losses (1914)

==== Streaks ====
- Longest undefeated streak (AFL): 13 games
- Longest undefeated streak (SANFL): 30 games
- Longest winless streak (AFL): 11 games
- Longest winless streak (SANFL): 8 games
- Longest winless streak (All-time): 28 matches (Round 1, 1870 - Round 2, 1873) (Note: This streak occurred prior to the formation of the SANFL.)

==== Attendances ====
- Largest minor round attendance (AFL): 65,834 (Melbourne Cricket Ground, Round 7, 2024 vs Collingwood)
- Largest minor round home attendance (AFL): 53,698 (Adelaide Oval, Round 3, 2017 vs Adelaide)
- Largest finals attendance (AFL): 97,302 (Melbourne Cricket Ground, 2007 AFL Grand Final, vs Geelong)
- Largest minor round attendance (SANFL): 22,738 (Alberton Oval, Round 11, 1977 vs Norwood)
- Largest finals attendance (SANFL): 66,897 (Football Park, 1976 SANFL Grand Final, vs Sturt)

=== Win–loss record ===
==== Overall win–loss record ====
- AFL – 669 matches / 357 wins / 307 losses / 5 draws (53.74%)
- SANFL – 2711 games – 1750 wins, 895 losses, 66 draws

==== Best win-loss record ====
- AFL: Gold Coast – 17 matches / 15 wins / 2 losses / 0 draws (88.24%)
- SANFL - All Time: Woodville – 58 matches / 50 wins / 7 losses / 1 draw (87.06%)
- SANFL - Current: Glenelg – 258 matches / 182 wins / 73 losses / 3 draws (71.12%)

==== Worst win-loss record ====
- AFL: Geelong – 14 wins / 30 losses / 1 draw (32.22%)
- SANFL: Norwood – 412 matches / 199 wins / 196 losses / 17 draws (50.36%)

==== AFL ====
Port Adelaide win–loss record (AFL)
Win%	Opponent	Games	Wins	Losses	Draws
88.24	Gold Coast	17	15	2	0
68.42	St Kilda	38	26	12	0
61.54	Essendon	39	24	15	0
60.71	Richmond	42	25	16	1
60	West Coast	40	24	16	0
59.52	Melbourne	42	25	17	0
58.14	Hawthorn	43	25	18	0
57.32	Carlton	41	23	17	1
56.41	Western Bulldogs	39	22	17	0
55.56	Fremantle	45	25	20	0
52.94	Greater Western Sydney	17	9	8	0
48.28	Adelaide	58	28	30	0
46.15	Collingwood	39	18	21	0
45.45	Brisbane	44	19	23	2
45.24	North Melbourne	42	19	23	0
42.11	Sydney	38	16	22	0
32.22	Geelong	44	14	30	1
Last updated: 19 March 2026

==== SANFL ====
Port Adelaide win–loss record (SANFL)
Win%	Opponent	Games	Wins	Losses	Draws
87.06	Woodville	58	50	7	1
73.82	West Torrens	235	173	61	1
71.12	Glenelg	258	182	73	3
70.59	South Adelaide	369	254	102	13
69.16	North Adelaide	334	231	103	0
65.50	West Adelaide	300	195	102	3
64.45	Sturt	301	193	106	2
61.53	Adelaide	13	8	5	0
60.52	Central District	152	91	59	2
50.62	Woodville-West Torrens	80	40	39	1
50.36	Norwood	412	199	196	17
Last updated: 19 March 2026

== Individual records ==
=== Games ===
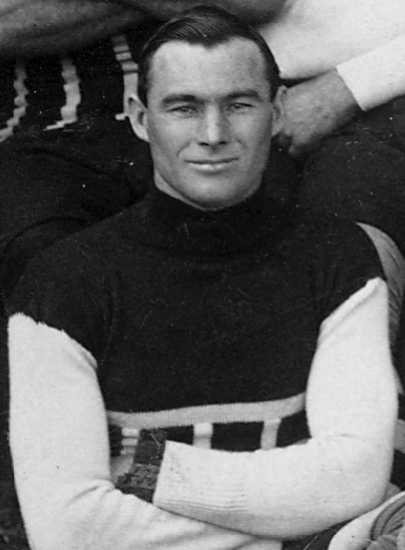
Sampson Hosking became the club's oldest player in 1936, being named as 19th man against West Torrens.

- Most games in all competitions: Travis Boak, 408
- Oldest player: Sampson Hosking (48 years and 154 days)
- Most consecutive games (AFL): Kane Cornes, 174 games
- Longest serving player: Travis Boak, 19 seasons (2007–2025)

=== Most games ===
Rank	Player	Career	SANFL	AFL	Other	Total	Ref
1	Travis Boak	2007–2025	1	387	20	408	
2	Russell Ebert	1968–1978, 1980–1985	367	0	25	392	
3	Darren Smith	1984–1996	343	0	0	343	
3	Greg Phillips	1976–1982, 1987–1993	343	0	0	343	
5	Kane Cornes	2001–2015	0	300	28	328	

=== Goalkicking ===
- Most goals kicked in all competitions: Tim Evans, 1041
- First player to score a goal: John Wald (against Young Australia, 30 July 1870)
- Most goals in a season: Scott Hodges, 153
- Most goals in a season (AFL): Warren Tredrea, 81
- Most goals scored in a match: Tim Evans, 16 (against West Adelaide, Round 5, 1980)
- Most goals scored in a match (AFL): Warren Tredrea and Jay Schulz, 8 (Round 7, 1998 and Round 14, 2014)

=== Most goals ===
Rank	Player	Career	SANFL	AFL	Total	Ref
1	Tim Evans	1975–1986	1041	0	1041	
2	Scott Hodges	1987–1998	690	690	690	
3	Warren Tredrea	1997–2010	33	549	582	
4	Darren Smith	1984–1996	505	0	505	
5	Rex Johns	1954–1963	451	0	451	

=== Games coached ===
Rank	Coach	Career	SANFL	AFL	Other	Total	Ref
1	John Cahill	SANFL: 1974–1982, 1988–1996, 2005; AFL: 1997–1998	443	44	0	487	
2	Fos Williams	1950–1958, 1962–1973	447	0	0	447	
3	Jack McGargill	1886–1908	336	0	0	336	
4	Ken Hinkley	2013–2025	298	0	22	320	
5	Mark Williams	1999–2010	0	274	0	274	

=== Premierships ===
==== As player ====
AFL

Rank	Name	Career	Premiership Count	Years	Ref
1	2004 premiership team	Various	1	2004	

SANFL

Rank	Name	Career	Premiership Count	Years	Ref
1	Geof Motley	1953–1966	9	1954, 1955, 1956, 1957, 1958, 1959, 1962, 1963, 1965	
2	Scott Hodges	1987–1990; 1992–1998	8	1988, 1989, 1990, 1992, 1994, 1995, 1996, 1998	
2	Greg Phillips	1976–1982; 1987–1993	8	1977, 1979, 1980, 1981, 1988, 1989, 1990, 1992	
2	Neville Hayes	1953–1965	8	1954, 1955, 1956, 1957, 1958, 1959, 1962, 1963	
2	Paul Northeast	1987; 1989–2000	8	1989, 1990, 1992, 1994, 1995, 1996, 1998, 1999	

==== As coach ====
Fos Williams won 9 premierships as Port Adelaide coach, including five consecutively.

AFL

Rank	Name	Career	Premiership Count	Years	Ref
1	Mark Williams	1999–2010	1	2004	

SANFL

Rank	Name	Career	Premiership Count	Years	Ref
1	John Cahill	1974–1982; 1988–1996; 2005	10	1977, 1979, 1980, 1981, 1988, 1989, 1990, 1992, 1994, 1995	
2	Fos Williams	1950–1958; 1962–1973	9	1951, 1954, 1955, 1956, 1957, 1958, 1962, 1963, 1965	
3	Sampson Hosking	1921; 1927–1938, 1942, 1944	5	1921, 1928, 1936, 1937, 1942	
4	Jack McGargill	1886–1908	4	1890, 1897, 1903, 1906	
5	Stephen Williams	1996–2003	3	1996, 1998, 1999	
