= Fos Williams =

Australian rules footballer and coach

- Williams in 1954

Personal information
- Full name: Foster Neil Williams
- Nickname: Fos
- Born: 21 February 1922; Quorn, South Australia
- Died: 1 September 2001 (aged 79); Novar Gardens, South Australia
- Original teams: Quorn Albions, Quorn High School
- Position: Rover

Playing career^{1}
Years	Club	Games (Goals)
1946–1949	West Adelaide	54 (112)
1950–1958	Port Adelaide	151 (263)
Total		205 (375)

Representative team honours
Years	Team	Games (Goals)
1947–1958	South Australia	34 (60)

Coaching career
Years	Club	Games (W–L–D)
1950–1958	Port Adelaide	180 (145–34–1)
1960	South Adelaide	18 (3–15–0)
1962–1973	Port Adelaide	267 (188–78–1)
1974–1978	West Adelaide	109 (42–67–0)
1955–1969	South Australia	45 (24–21–0)
- ^{1} Playing statistics correct to the end of 1978.

Career highlights
- Club: 6× Port Adelaide premiership player: 1951, 1954, 1955, 1956, 1957, 1958; 2× Port Adelaide best & fairest: 1950, 1955; 1× West Adelaide premiership player: 1947; 3× Port Adelaide leading goalkicker: 1950, 1951, 1955; 5AD Footballer of the Year: 1958; Representative: 5× South Australia captain: 1954, 1955, 1956, 1957, 1958; 2× Sporting Life All-Australian: 1950, 1951; Simpson Medalist: 1955 (Best player, WA v SA); Coaching: 9× Port Adelaide premiership coach: 1951, 1954, 1955, 1956, 1957, 1958, 1962, 1963, 1965; Honours: Australian Football Hall of Fame inaugural inductee (1996); South Australian Football Hall of Fame inaugural inductee (2002); Port Adelaide Hall of Fame inaugural inductee (1998); SANFL life member; The Advertiser Player of the Year: 1950, 1955; Port Adelaide life member; Port Adelaide 'Greatest Team' (2001 (captain-coach))

Foster Neil "Fos" Williams AM (21 February 1922 – 1 September 2001) was a leading Australian rules footballer who played for and coached the Port Adelaide and West Adelaide Football Clubs and coached South Adelaide in the South Australian National Football League (SANFL) in a career spanning 1946–1978. He also played 34 interstate games for South Australia, captaining the team from 1954 to 1958 and he coached the team in 45 games from 1955 to 1969.

== Early life ==
Born in the town of Quorn, located in the Flinders Ranges and some 39 km north-east of Port Augusta, the son of Melville George Williams and Emma Otellia Williams (née McMillan).

The only football Williams played prior to World War II was in Quorn. He played for the Quorn Albions and also was a start player for Quorn High School.

== Army and Navy during World War II (1942–1946) ==
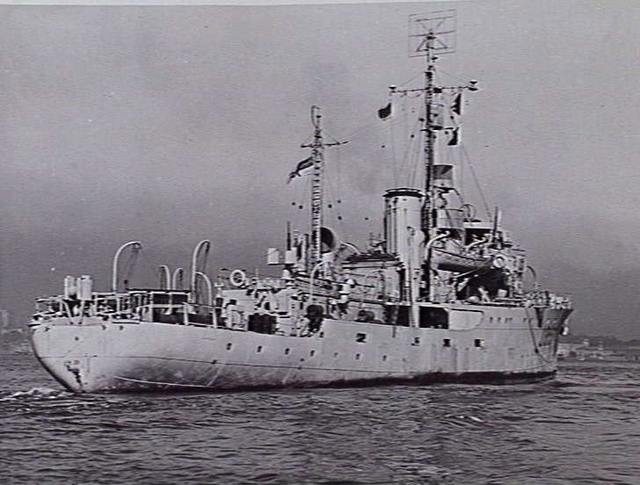
Fos Williams served as a telegrapher on the corvette HMAS Kiama.

Williams enlisted in the Australian Army on 5 March 1942, serving as a signalman.

On 32 March 1943 Williams transferred to the Royal Australian Navy where he served as a telegrapher on the corvette HMAS Kiama.

HMAS Kiama's initial duty was to escort convoys along the New Guinea coastline. In June 1944 she was given a reassignment to perform anti-submarine patrols in the Solomon Sea. In September Kiama was used to transport soldiers between New Guinea and New Britain. On conclusion, she resumed her convoy escort role until the end of 1944, when she departed for Sydney. In September 1944 Commandos from 'C' Troop and a small detachment from 'B' Troop, the 2/8th Commando Squadron were landed from HMAS Kiama on a reconnaissance operation at Jacquinot Bay on the island of New Britain to collect intelligence in preparation for an assault by the 5th Division. On 25 December the crew was recalled from leave to go to the assistance of the liberty ship SS Robert J. Walker, which had been torpedoed by German submarine U-862. Kiama, along with Quickmatch, Yandra, and USS PC597 found the 67 survivors of the attack at but failed to locate U-862. Kiama was assigned to anti-submarine patrols near Sydney for the final days of 1945 before a month-long refit in Adelaide starting on 3 January 1945. After the refit Kiama was assigned to Fremantle for two months of anti-submarine warfare exercises with the United States Navy, before returning to New Guinea on 7 May 1945. In May and June, the corvette performed several coastal bombardments in the Bougainville area. In July, Kiama transported Prince Henry, Duke of Gloucester from New Guinea to the Solomon Islands, then spent the rest of the month moving troops and military cargo between these two locations. From 5 to 24 August, the corvette was based in Brisbane, before returning to New Guinea waters. Kiama spent the rest of 1945 as a troop and supply transport, minesweeper, and general duties vessel. When the war ended, Kiama took part in the Japanese surrender at Rabaul. In November, Kiama was assigned to escort demilitarized Japanese cruiser Kashima as the cruiser embarked Japanese soldiers in New Guinea for repatriation.

Fos Williams was discharged from service on HMAS Kiama on 6 June 1946, nine months after the conclusion of World War II.

== West Adelaide (1946–1949) ==
Williams had a late start to football due to World War II, returning to Adelaide to start his career as a league footballer in July 1946 at the age of 24.

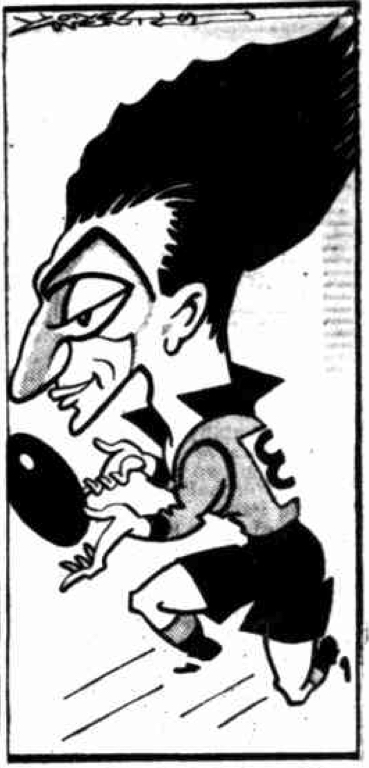
Lionel Coventry cartoon of Fos Williams from 1947 during his time with West Adelaide

Williams initially wanted to play with Port Adelaide where his brother Frank had been playing. However, because he was living in the Hilton district within the West Adelaide zone, he was required by the SANFL to play for the latter club. Subsequently, Williams became the 609th player selected to play for club in the SANFL making his league debut on 20 July 1946.

Williams played as a rover in West Adelaide's victorious 1947 Grand Final against Norwood at the Adelaide Oval.

West Adelaide looked likely to repeat their success of the previous season but would fall four points short to eventual premiers Norwood in the year's preliminary final.

Williams first gained state selection for South Australia while with West Adelaide and also kicked 112 goals for the club until the end of 1949. At the end of 1949 Fos Williams was approached by representatives of clubs from Western Australia and Victoria, particularly Geelong and Subiaco, in attempts to lure him away from West Adelaide.

== Port Adelaide player coach (1950–1958) ==
Fos Williams in 1953

Port Adelaide's first preference to replace Jack McCarthy as head coach was South Adelaide's Jim Deane, but South Adelaide refused to release him from his contract. On 22 January 1950 Williams, who had received lucrative offers from clubs interstate, was released by West Adelaide to become captain-coach of Port Adelaide.

In his first year at Port, he won the club's best and fairest award and led the team to a preliminary final, where they were however well beaten by Glenelg.

In 1951, he won his second SANFL premiership as a player and the first of a then record nine as a coach when he led Port Adelaide to an eleven-point win over North Adelaide in the Grand Final after losing only one game on a Thebarton Oval mudheap all season. Under the coaching of Williams from 1950 until 1958, Port returned to a position of power in the league and along with the 1951 win they won five consecutive from 1954 to 1958 and finished second to West Torrens in 1953.

After 1950, Port Adelaide only missed the Grand Final under Fos Williams guidance when they lost the preliminary to Norwood by eleven points in 1952.

In 1953, Williams returned Port Adelaide to the Grand Final, a stage where the club would remain for seven consecutive seasons. During the 1953 SANFL Grand Final Port Adelaide would fall to West Torrens by 7 points. In 1954 Williams led Port Adelaide to its second premiership under his guidance, defeating his old club West Adelaide by 3 points in the 1954 SANFL Grand Final.

In 1955, Port Adelaide defeated Norwood in the 1955 SANFL Grand Final by 63 points.

In 1956, Williams again defeated his old club West Adelaide, this time by 16 points in the 1956 SANFL Grand Final.

In 1957, Port Adelaide defeated Norwood for the second time in three years for the premiership.

For the third time in five years, and what would be his last before retiring as a player and stepping away from football for 1959, Williams guided Port Adelaide to the 1958 SANFL premiership with a two point Grand Final victory over West Adelaide.

After leaving Alberton at the end of 1958, Williams' influence at Port Adelaide was still evident in his three-year absence with the team's style of play changing little under new coach (and Williams' old teammate) Geof Motley. Motley took over as captain-coach and Port would win a sixth successive flag in 1959 and finish third in 1960 and 1961 before Williams returned in 1962.

During his time as captain-coach of Port Adelaide, Fos Williams wrote the club creed.

== Year away from Football (1959) ==
After 1958, citing exhaustion, Williams spent a year out of the game.

== Coach of South Adelaide (1960) ==
After spending a year out of the game following his retirement as a player, Fos Williams looked to become reinvolved in league football.

Williams re-entry into league football as a non-playing coach began when he took over South Adelaide in 1960. Unfortunately for both South Adelaide and Williams he could do little with the underperforming Panthers and the club finished seventh with only three wins in his sole season in charge.

== Return to Port Adelaide as coach (1962–1973) ==
Williams returned to Alberton in 1962 as non-playing coach taking over from Geof Motley, who stayed on as team captain. Williams once again led Port Adelaide to premierships in 1962. The Port Adelaide Football Club's creed was written and spoken for the first time in 1962 by Fos Williams.

"We, the Players and Management of the Port Adelaide Football Club, accept the heritage which players and administrators have passed down to us; in doing so we do not intend to rest in idleness but shall strive with all our power to further this Club's unexcelled achievements. To do this we believe there is a great merit and noble achievements in winning a premiership.

To be successful, each of us must be active, aggressive and devoted to this cause. We agree that success is well within our reach and have confidence that each member of both the team and management will suffer personal sacrifices for the common end.

Also we know that, should we after striving to our utmost and giving our everything, still not be successful, our efforts will become a further part of this Club's enviable tradition.

Finally, we concede that there can be honour in defeat, but to each of us, honourable defeat of our Club and guernsey can only come after human endeavour on the playing field is completely exhausted."

— Fos Williams

Port Adelaide would win back-to-back premierships in 1963. This would mean that Port Adelaide had won 8 of the last 10 premierships and the SANFL would subsequently introduce the neighbouring Woodville Woodpeckers in an effort, at least partially, to weaken Port Adelaide's dominance. The most tangible impact of this change would be Malcolm Blight, a Port supporter in his youth, falling out of the Port Adelaide zone into Woodville's.

Port Adelaide made the 1964 SANFL Grand Final but lost to South Adelaide in what remains their most recent premiership.

Port Adelaide won the 1965 SANFL Grand Final defeating Sturt in front of 62,543 spectators which is still the record crowd for a sporting event at Adelaide Oval.

Sturt defeated Port Adelaide in the following three SANFL Grand Finals in 1966, 1967, 1968.

Port Adelaide missed the SANFL finals for the first and only time in 1969 with Fos Williams as coach.

Port Adelaide finished minor premiers in 1970 but lost the preliminary final to Glenelg by 18 points.

Port Adelaide would lose the 1971 SANFL Grand Final to that year's minor premiers North Adelaide.

In a repeat of the previous year's decider North Adelaide would beat Port in the 1972 SANFL Grand Final and would go on to beat Carlton for the 1972 Championship of Australia.

Fos Williams continued to coach Port Adelaide until the end of the 1973 season when they finished fifth. During his 21 seasons at the helm of the Port Adelaide, the club competed in twenty finals series (missing only in 1969), sixteen Grand Finals and had won nine premierships. At the time this was the record for coaching in the SANFL. John Cahill, protege and successor of Williams took over as Port Adelaide coach for 1974 and would go on to break Williams' record of 9 premierships as coach, when he won 10, all with Port Adelaide.

== West Adelaide coach (1974–1978) ==
Williams returned to West Adelaide as coach in 1974 but the side finished with its third "wooden spoon" in a row. Williams recruited former Port Adelaide rover Trevor Grimwood in 1975 and the Bloods improved, making their first finals series since 1969 by finishing fifth in 1976 and improved again to reach the finals again in 1977, ultimately finishing third after losing to Glenelg in the Preliminary Final at Football Park. 1977 also saw Grimwood win the Magarey Medal. 1977 was the 23rd and last SANFL Finals series to feature Fos Williams as a coach.

After finishing with a 14–8 record in 1977, West Adelaide slumped in what was Fos Williams' last year as an SANFL league coach in 1978. The Bloods finished with only five wins and a draw and ninth place; however one of the wins was the only loss inflicted upon Sturt prior to the Grand Final. Following this disappointing result Williams retired from coaching.

== Interstate Football ==
In early July, Fos Williams was named for the first time in the South Australian team for the upcoming 1947 Hobart Carnival at the expense of an injured Jack Oatey.

Williams was captain of the South Australian state from 1954 to 1958.

Williams won a Simpson Medal for best on ground in the 1955 WA v SA match played in Perth.

1963 Victoria v. South Australia	G	B	Total
Victoria	10	13	73
South Australia	12	8	80
Venue: Melbourne Cricket Ground	Crowd: 59,260

"If I could create an image with words of a red guernsey hell-bent on getting the front position, disregarding personal safety, attacking the ball, swooping up opponents with speed and determination so that nothing was left undone which could have been done, then you would have the picture of the crusade which has earned this state and SA football prestige which I doubt has existed for a long time – if ever before."

— Fos Williams, 17 June 1963

Williams was also the coach of the South Australian team from 1955 to 1958, from 1960 to 1966 and again in 1968 and 1969. During his time as state coach, Williams was instrumental in instilling the belief in his players that their usual tormentors, Victoria, were no better than they were and it all culminated in 1963 with a seven-point win over the Big V at the Melbourne Cricket Ground (MCG), their first win in Melbourne since 1926.

Fos Williams was named in the Sporting Life "Team of the Year" in both 1950 and 1951. On both occasions he was selected in the Forward pocket.

During his career as a player Fos Williams represented South Australia on 34 occasions in Interstate matches.

Football historian and Norwood supporter Bernard Whimpress believes the passion that Fos Williams had for interstate football added a lot to the rivalry.

== Personal life and family ==
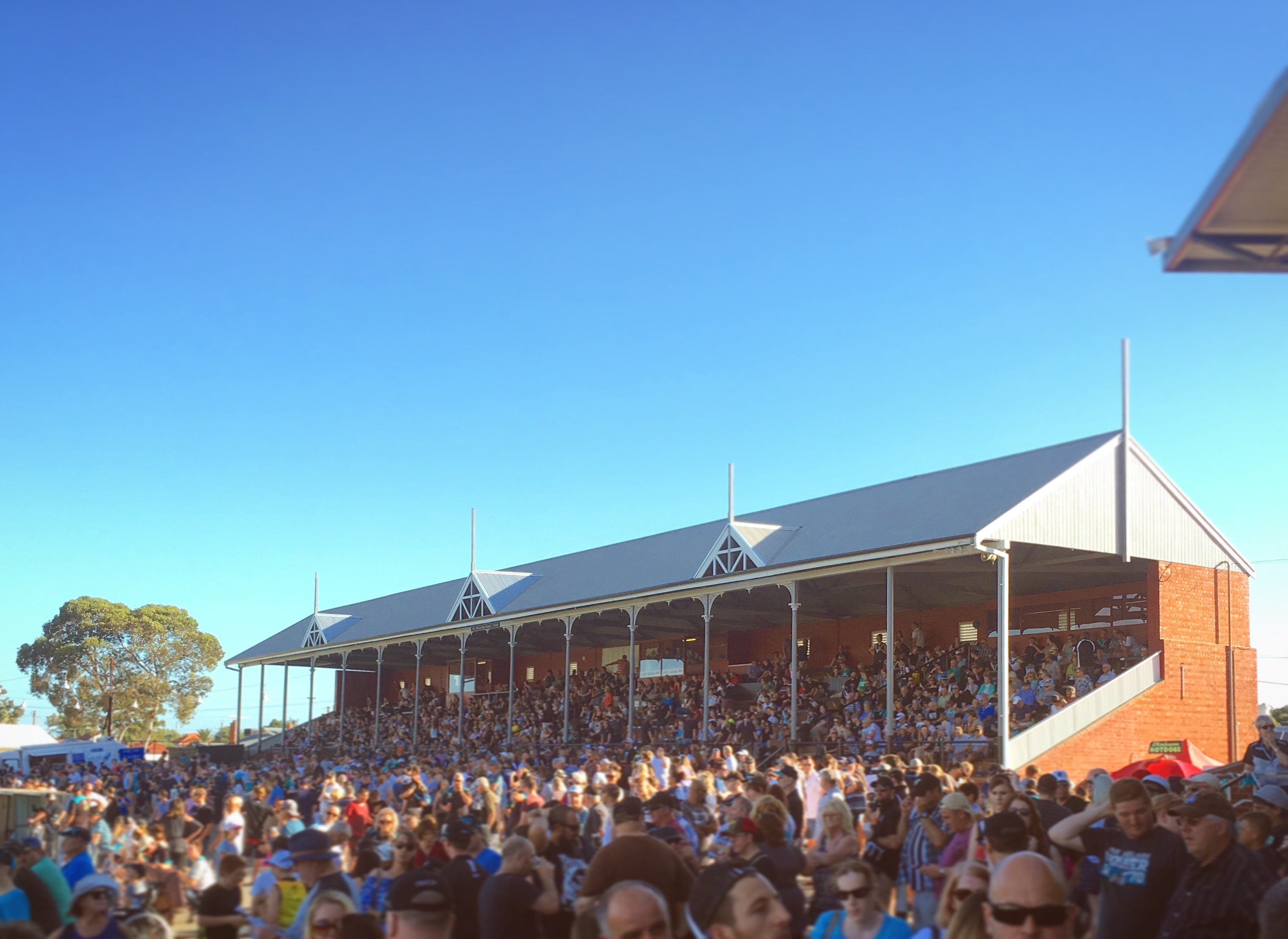
The Fos Williams Family Grandstand, built in 1903 at Alberton Oval, was named in honour of Fos Williams. This is in addition to a grandstand at Adelaide Oval also being named in honour of Fos Williams.

Fos Williams was the son of Melville George Williams and Emma Otellia Williams (née McMillan). He had three brothers who played league football being Frank, Glynn and Alec Williams. Frank played with Port Adelaide, Glynn played for West Adelaide and Sturt while Alec played predominantly for Sturt with a single season at South Fremantle in 1940.

Williams married Veronica Ganley on 26 January 1956 in Unley, South Australia. Their four children all had successful sports careers. Son Mark Williams played 380 games of league football for West Adelaide and Port Adelaide in the SANFL, and Collingwood and Brisbane in the VFL, and coached the Australian Football League's Port Adelaide Football Club for twelve years, including its first AFL premiership. Anthony Williams (Mark's twin, died 1988) also played for West Adelaide and Port Adelaide. Youngest son Stephen Williams played 268 games and coached eight seasons for Port Adelaide in the SANFL, winning nine premierships as player and coach. Daughter Jenny Williams represented Australia in several sports, but was best noted as a lacrosse player.

Williams died on 1 September 2001 aged 79. He was survived by his wife Von, sons Mark and Stephen and daughter Jenny.

== Legacy ==
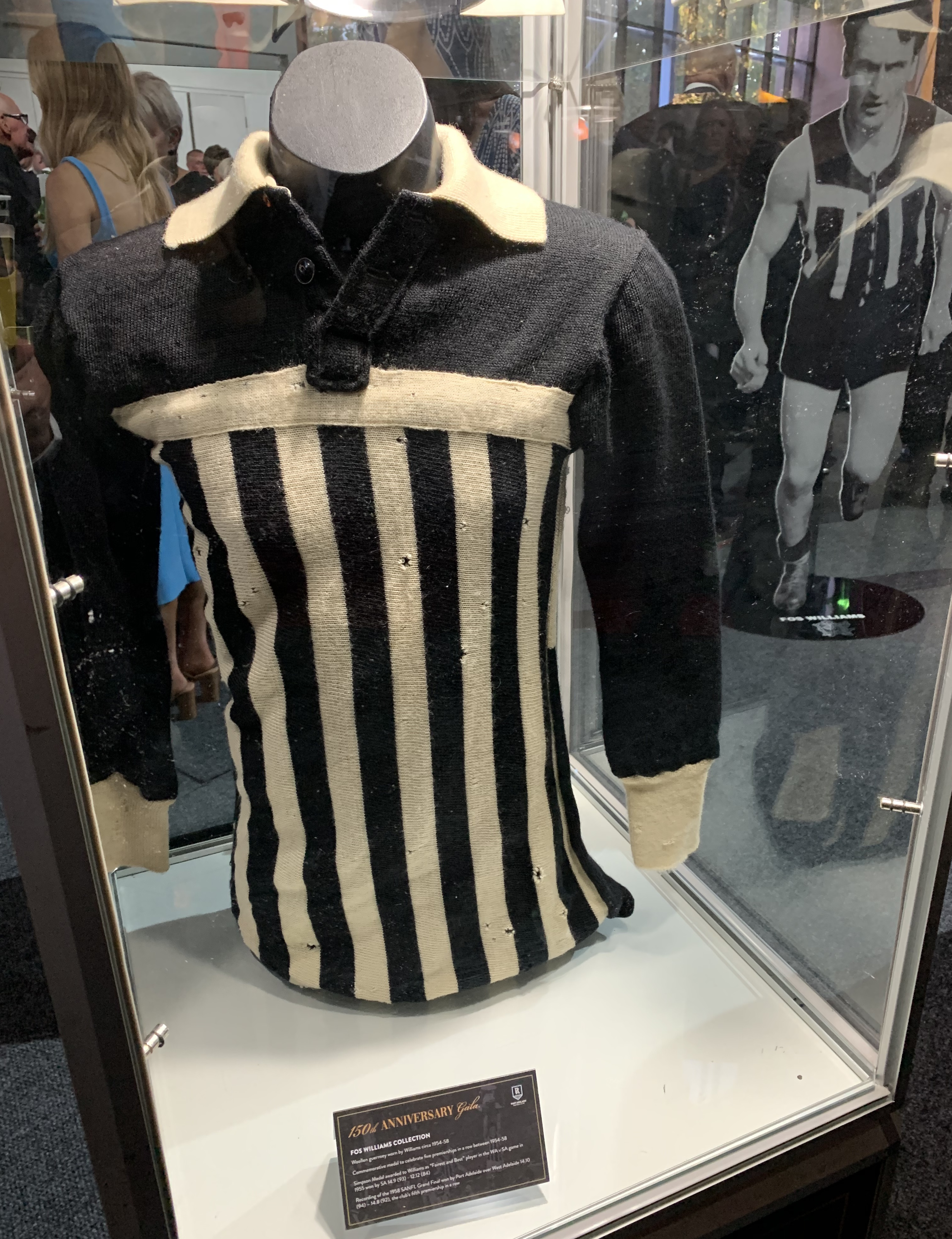
Woollen Fos Williams' Port Adelaide guernsey from the mid-to-late 1950s

Football historian John Devaney wrote of Williams that "Perhaps more than any other single individual, Fos Williams was responsible for catapulting South Australian football out of its predominantly casual, laissez faire mentality into the same kind of professional, brutally expedient, 'win at all costs' mindset as prevailed across the border in Victoria."

Williams was made a Member of the Order of Australia on 26 January 1981 for his service to the sport of Australian football.

Williams has a number of honours in his name, such as the Fos Williams Medal, awarded to South Australia's best player in a State of Origin game, and grandstands at both Alberton Oval and Adelaide Oval named the "Fos Williams Stand".

Australian Football Hall of Fame legend Barrie Robran said of Fos Williams that "He is a truly great man. His legacy to Australian football will be both indelibly and deservedly imprinted in the annals of South Australian football".

Football historian and journalist Michelangelo Rucci in 1999 proclaimed that "When the century ends in 2000 and they assess all the men who have built the Port Adelaide Football Club into a power in South Australian football one man will stand above all – Foster Neil Williams".
