= Neville Hayes (footballer) =

Australian rules footballer

Personal information
- Nickname: Chicken
- Born: 12 May 1935
- Died: 6 December 2023 (aged 88)
- Positions: Defender, forward

Playing career
Years	Club	Games (Goals)
1953–1965	Port Adelaide	217 (58)

Representative team honours
Years	Team	Games (Goals)
1955–1964	South Australia	21

Career highlights
- Port Adelaide's greatest team (half-back flank); South Australian Football Hall of Fame (2002); 8× Port Adelaide premiership player (1954, 1955, 1956, 1957, 1958, 1959, 1962, 1963); 2× Port Adelaide best and fairest (1957, 1960); Port Adelaide life membership (1962); SANFL life membership

Neville Hayes (12 May 1935 – 6 December 2023) was an Australian rules footballer who played for the Port Adelaide Football Club. Primarily playing as a defender, he won eight premierships during his career.

North Adelaide forward Jeff Pash described Hayes as a "player of all-round gifts who backs his judgement (to a hair-raising extent in this particular case) and plays his man at a distance".
