= Ted Whelan =

Australian rules footballer

Personal information
- Full name: Alfred Edward Whelan
- Nickname: Ted
- Born: 6 December 1929
- Died: 22 June 2015 (aged 85)
- Positions: Ruckman, Defender

Playing career
Years	Club	Games (Goals)
1949–1961	Port Adelaide	248 (91)

Representative team honours
Years	Team	Games (Goals)
1954–1960	South Australia	20

Career highlights
- Port Adelaide's greatest team (Back pocket); 7× Port Adelaide premiership player (1951, 1954, 1955, 1956, 1957, 1958, 1959); South Australia captain; Port Adelaide best and fairest (1956); Port Adelaide life membership (1957); SANFL life membership; South Australian Football Hall of Fame (2002)

Alfred Edward Whelan (6 December 1929 – 22 June 2015) was a champion player for the Port Adelaide Football Club winning seven premierships during his career. He was the first Port Adelaide player to reach 200 league games.

Whelan went to Le Fevre Boys Technical School.

Whelan won Port Adelaide's best and fairest award in 1956 and finished runner-up in the award on two other occasions.
