= Dave Boyd =

Australian rules footballer

- Boyd during his Port Adelaide career

Personal information
- Full name: David Edward Boyd
- Born: 16 August 1927; Largs Bay, South Australia
- Died: 15 December 2017 (aged 90)
- Position: Forward/CENTRE

Playing career^{1}
| Years | Club | Games (Goals) |
| 1948–1960 | Port Adelaide | 222 (183) NEVER MISSED A GAME |

Representative team honours
| Years | Team | Games (Goals) |
| 1949–1958 | South Australia | 19 |
- ^{1} Playing statistics correct to the end of 1960.

Career highlights
- Port Adelaide's greatest team (half-forward flank); South Australian Football Hall of Fame (2002); 7× Port Adelaide premiership player (1951, 1954, 1955, 1956, 1957, 1958, 1959); Magarey Medal (1956)

David Edward 'Davey' Boyd (16 August 1927 – 15 December 2017) was an Australian rules footballer who played with Port Adelaide in the South Australian National Football League (SANFL).

== Port Adelaide ==
Boyd was a key member of the strong Port Adelaide side of the 1950s, playing in seven premiership sides.

He made his debut in 1948 and although he started as a forward he soon developed into a centreman, the position that he would play the majority of his career in. He was a Magarey Medallist in 1956 and a regular interstate representative for South Australia, appearing in three carnivals. He finished his career in 1960 after playing a total of 222 games for Port Adelaide.

== Personal life ==
Boyd's sons Greg and Russell also played for Port Adelaide.

== Honours ==
He is a half forward flanker in Port Adelaide's official 'Greatest Team' from 1870 to 2000.
