= John Abley =

Australian rules footballer

- John Abley at Port Adelaide training in August 1957.

Personal information
- Full name: John William Abley
- Born: 18 October 1930; Melbourne, Victoria
- Died: 19 August 2011 (aged 80); Adelaide, South Australia
- Original teams: Melbourne District; Hawthorn Reserves
- Height: 185 cm (6 ft 1 in)
- Weight: 79 kg (174 lb)
- Position: Full-back

Playing career^{1}
Years	Club	Games (Goals)
1950–1961	Port Adelaide	212 (1)

Representative team honours
Years	Team	Games (Goals)
1953–1961	South Australia	23
- ^{1} Playing statistics correct to the end of 1961.

Career highlights
- Club: 7× Port Adelaide premiership player (1951, 1954, 1955, 1956, 1957, 1958, 1959); Representative: 3× All-Australian team (1956, 1958, 1961); 23 games for South Australia; Honours: Port Adelaide's greatest team (full back); South Australian Football Hall of Fame (2002); SANFL life member; Port Adelaide life member (1959); Australian Football Hall of Fame (2020)

John Abley (18 October 1930 – 19 August 2011) was an Australian rules footballer who played with Port Adelaide in the South Australian National Football League (SANFL) between 1950 and 1961.

== Hawthorn reserves (1949) ==
John Abley grew up in Melbourne. During the 1949 VFL season he played reserves football with Hawthorn Football Club but turned his back on a possible career with the club in the seniors when he moved to Adelaide, South Australia.

== Move to Adelaide ==
When Abley moved to Adelaide it looked as if he would be playing for Glenelg (as his younger brother Kevin did), as the area he planned on residing in was part of Glenelg's recruiting zone. Port Adelaide officials, at the suggestion of Bob McLean, hastily arranged accommodation in Port's zone in the hope of acquiring his services. Abley debuted for Port Adelaide in 1950.

== Port Adelaide (1950–1961) ==
A fullback, Abley first played in that position for Port in a "Challenge match" in Broken Hill at the end of his debut season and after impressing was kept there for the remainder of his career. He was a member of the famed Port team which won six premierships in succession from 1954 to 1959, an Australian record.

He has the habit of worry that makes for perfect concentration,
sure-footedness (never a reckless throw for the ball),
and the safest, most relaxed mark in the business.

— Jeff Pash, North Adelaide champion and journalist

Abley was a regular South Australian interstate representative and played a total of 23 games for his state. On three occasions Abley was selected as an All-Australian for his performances at the carnivals, in 1956, 1958 and 1961.

In 1959, Abley was named as a life member of the Port Adelaide Football Club because of his talent, his warmth off the field and being one of only six players to play in all of Port Adelaide's premierships in the 1950s (1951, 1954, 1955, 1956, 1957, 1958 and 1959).

== Personal life ==
Abley died on 19 August 2011, aged 81, after a short illness.

== Honours ==
In 1998, Abley was inducted into the South Australian Football Hall of Fame.

In 2001 Abley was named as the fullback in Port Adelaide's official "Greatest Team", taking into account all players to have represented the club since 1870.

In 2020, Abley was inducted into the Australian Football Hall of Fame.
