= Lloyd Zucker =

Australian rules footballer

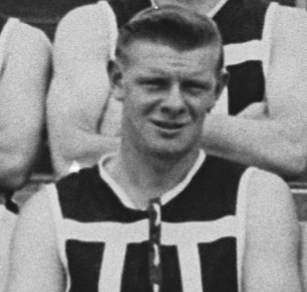

Personal information
- Nickname: Zook
- Born: 23 March 1929
- Died: 21 September 2009 (aged 80)
- Original team: Exeter
- Position: Ruckman

Playing career
Years	Club	Games (Goals)
1949–1959	Port Adelaide	183 (259)

Representative team honours
Years	Team	Games (Goals)
	South Australia	?

Career highlights
- 6× Port Adelaide premiership player (1954, 1955, 1956, 1957, 1958, 1959); State Representative (South Australia); Port Adelaide leading goalkicker (1949); Port Adelaide greatest team 1870–2000

Lloyd Zucker (23 March 1929 – 21 September 2009) was an Australian rules footballer who played for Port Adelaide Football Club in the South Australian National Football League during the 1950s.
