= Geof Motley =

Australian rules footballer and coach (1935–2023)

Geof Motley OAM

Personal information
- Full name: Geofrey Peter Motley
- Born: 3 January 1935; Port Adelaide, South Australia
- Died: 26 September 2023 (aged 88)
- Height: 180 cm (5 ft 11 in)
- Weight: 85 kg (187 lb)

Playing career^{1}
Years	Club	Games (Goals)
1953–1966	Port Adelaide	258 (156)

Representative team honours
Years	Team	Games (Goals)
1954–1965	South Australia	28

Coaching career
Years	Club	Games (W–L–D)
1959–1961	Port Adelaide	62 (48–14–0)
1967–1969	North Adelaide	64 (44–20–0)
Total		126 (92–34–0)
- ^{1} Playing statistics correct to the end of 1966.

Career highlights
- Club: Magarey Medal (1964); 9× Port Adelaide premiership player (1954, 1955, 1956, 1957, 1958, 1959, 1962, 1963, 1965); 4× Port Adelaide best and fairest (1958, 1959, 1963, 1965); Port Adelaide captain (1959-1966); Representative: 28 matches for South Australia; Coaching: Port Adelaide premiership coach (1959); Honours: Port Adelaide's greatest team (right half-back); Australian Football Hall of Fame (2002); South Australian Football Hall of Fame (2008); Life Member - Port Adelaide Football Club; Life Member - SANFL

Geofrey Peter Motley OAM (3 January 1935 – 26 September 2023) was an Australian rules footballer and coach who played for South Australian National Football League (SANFL) side Port Adelaide. Motley was born near Alberton Oval, the home ground of the Port Adelaide Football Club, and grew up supporting Port Adelaide.

Motley was awarded the Medal of the Order of Australia (OAM) in the 1992 Australia Day Honours "for service to sport administration and Australian rules football."

== Football career ==
=== Port Adelaide (1954–1966) ===
For eight seasons from 1959 to 1966, Motley captained the then dominating team of the SANFL, Port Adelaide, including a stint as captain-coach from 1959 to 1961. He was the only man to appear in all nine of the Magpies' premiership teams between 1954 and 1965. Motley played a total of 258 games for Port between 1953 and 1966 and also represented South Australia on 28 occasions.

During his career, Motley was never dropped from the team, nor was he reported. In this era, not being reported for foul play was a rarity for a player as having a certain amount of mongrel or thuggery was seen as commonplace.

Motley was named Port Adelaide's best and fairest player in 1958, 1959, 1963, and 1965; and won the Magarey Medal in 1964.

=== North Adelaide coach (1967–1969) ===
Following his playing retirement, Motley went on to coach North Adelaide from 1967 to 1969, taking the club to third, third, and fifth place respectively. The Roosters won the minor premiership in 1967 but were unable to compete successfully against Sturt and Port Adelaide in the major round. Under Motley's tutelage, Australian Football Hall of Fame Legend Barrie Robran debuted and won his first Magarey Medal.

== Honours ==
After retiring, Motley was bestowed with several honours including life membership of Port Adelaide and the SANFL, and membership of the South Australian Football Hall of Fame and the Australian Football Hall of Fame. In 2001, Motley was named on a half-back flank in Port Adelaide's 'Greatest Team of All Time'. A player's entry gate onto the Adelaide Oval, known as a 'race', has been named in his honour.

== Personal life ==
Motley was married to fellow sportsperson Gaynor Motley (née Flanagan), who represented Australia in basketball (competing in the first world championships in Rio de Janeiro) and netball, as well as South Australia in softball. The pair were married until Gaynor's death in 1999.

Their son, Peter, played for rival SANFL club Sturt and Victorian Football League (VFL) club Carlton, while Motley's second cousin was Port Adelaide captain Warren Tredrea.

== Death ==
Motley died on 26 September 2023, at the age of 88.
