= 1954 SANFL Grand Final =

Port Adelaide	West Adelaide
11.13 (79)	10.16 (76)
	1	2	3	4
PTA	2.4 (16)	3.6 (24)	9.10 (64)	11.13 (79)
WA	2.7 (19)	7.7 (49)	9.12 (66)	10.16 (76)
- Date: Saturday, 2 October (2:10 pm)
- Stadium: Adelaide Oval
- Attendance: 42,895
- Favourite: Port Adelaide
- Umpires: Ken Aplin

Accolades
- Best on Ground: Fos Williams; Colin Brown
- Australian Football Hall of Fame: Fos Williams (1996); Geof Motley (2002); John Abley (2020)

The 1954 SANFL Grand Final was an Australian rules football game contested between the Port Adelaide Football Club and the West Adelaide Football Club, held at the Adelaide Oval on Saturday 2 October 1954. It was the 56th annual Grand Final of the South Australian National Football League, staged to determine the premiers of the 1954 SANFL season. The match, attended by 42,895 spectators, was won by Port Adelaide by a margin of 3 points, marking that clubs fifteenth premiership victory.

== Background ==
Before the 1954 SANFL Grand Final there had been four meetings between Port Adelaide and West Adelaide during the season with the former winning all four encounters.

The SANFL spent £1,500 insuring the game against inclement weather. The SANFL also put forward £200 as prize money for the winning team.

Brothers Fos Williams and Glynn Williams played against each other representing Port Adelaide and West Adelaide respectively.

== Match Summary ==
The weather during the day was hot with newspaper writers suggesting that it would be a gruelling match for the players. It was also humid.

=== First quarter ===
West Adelaide's small forwards helped them to take a 3 point lead in the first quarter.

=== Second quarter ===
Towards the end of the second quarter Brian Faehse punched Dave Boyd causing him to fall over. As a result of this confrontation a large fracas broke out which was only quelled when the siren to end the quarter sounded. On the way back to their rooms some West Adelaide players were assaulted by spectators leading to calls after the game for improved security for players.

During half time Fos Williams gave his players a significant pep talk.

=== Third quarter ===
After the half time break Geof Motley moved to centre-half forward. West Adelaide captain Brian Faehse was injured early in the third quarter.

=== Fourth quarter ===
West Adelaide had opportunities to win the game in the last quarter but wayward kicking let them down.

=== Post-match ===
The Port Adelaide players and officials had a celebratory dinner at the Largs Pier Hotel after the match. Bob McLean placed Lloyd Zucker at the head of the table as a gesture of appreciation for his game. Six of the Port Adelaide players had to leave the dinner early to attend a function run by radio station 5KA, the precursor to Triple M Adelaide, which was held at the Port Adelaide Town Hall.

=== West End Brewery chimney ===
The 1954 SANFL Grand Final was the first instance of a tradition where the chimney of the West End Brewery would be painted in the colours of the winning team. At the suggestion of Fos Williams, the runner up would also have their colours added to the West End Brewery chimney.

== Teams ==
The teams were unchanged.

Port Adelaide
B:	John Robinson	John Abley	Laurence Stevens
HB:	Colin Parham	Roger Clift	Allan Greer
C:	Harold McDonald	Dave Boyd	Kenneth Tierney
HF:	Basil Jaggard	Brian Coldwell	Geof Motley
F:	John Hall	Tom Garland	Marx Kretschmer
Foll:	Lloyd Zucker	Ted Whelan	Fos Williams
Int:	Neville Hayes	Dean Trowse	Kevin Growden
Int:	Ronald Leaver		
Coach:	Fos Williams		

West Adelaide
B:	Clarence Cannon	Doug Thomas	Leon Lovegrove
HB:	Max Hewitt	Brian Faehse	Bob Lee
C:	Brian Slattery	Gar Burkett	Ken Eglinton
HF:	Bishop	Ralph Packham	Stan Costello
F:	Kies	Ken McGregor	Jimmy Wright
Foll:	Fred A'Court	Glyn Williams	Colin Brown
Int:	Max Chynowoth	Perry	Jack Richardson
Int:	Vic Stoll		
Coach:	Laurie Cahill		

== Scoreboard ==
Grand Final
Port Adelaide	v	West Adelaide	Adelaide Oval (crowd: 42,895)
2.4 (16); 3.6 (24); 9.10 (64); 11.13 (79)	Q1; Q2; Q3; Final	2.7 (19); 7.7 (49); 9.12 (66); 10.16 (76)
Zucker – 4 Motley – 3 Jaggard, Hall, Coldwell, Hayes — 1	Goals	3 – Wright; 2 – Kies, Bishop; 1 – McGregor, Brown, Packham, G. Williams, Cannon, Costello
