= 1984 SANFL season =

- Teams: 10
- Premiers: Norwood; 26th premiership
- Minor premiers: Port Adelaide; 39th minor premiership
- Magarey Medallist: John Platten; Central District (66 votes)
- Ken Farmer Medallist: Tim Evans; Port Adelaide (127 Goals)

Attendance
- Matches played: 116
- Total attendance: 898,894 (7,749 per match)
- Highest: 50,271 (Grand Final, Norwood vs. Port Adelaide)

The 1984 South Australian National Football League season was the 105th season of the top-level Australian rules football competition in South Australia.

Norwood finished 5th on the ladder but won all four of its finals, to win the premiership. They became the first SANFL team to win the premiership from 5th, and the first to win from the Elimination Final.

== Ladder ==
1984 SANFL Ladder
Pos	Team	Pld	W	L	D	PF	PA	PP	Pts
1	Port Adelaide	22	17	5	0	2605	2049	55.97	34
2	Glenelg	22	17	5	0	2669	2207	54.74	34
3	Central District	22	16	6	0	2513	2071	54.82	32
4	South Adelaide	22	13	9	0	2469	2080	54.28	26
5	Norwood (P)	22	13	9	0	2407	2343	50.67	26
6	West Adelaide	22	10	12	0	2342	2569	47.69	20
7	Sturt	22	8	14	0	2382	2746	46.45	16
8	North Adelaide	22	6	16	0	2397	2390	50.07	12
9	West Torrens	22	6	16	0	2193	2791	44.00	12
10	Woodville	22	4	18	0	2356	3087	43.28	8

Rules for classification: 1) points; 2) percentage; 3) number of points for.
(P) Premiers

== Grand final ==
1984 SANFL Grand Final
Sunday, 30 September (2:10pm)	Port Adelaide	def. by	Norwood	Football Park (crowd: 50,271)
1.2 (8); 8.7 (55); 11.11 (77); 13.13 (91)	Q1; Q2; Q3; Final	4.3 (27); 9.5 (61); 11.8 (74); 15.10 (100)
