= 1964 SANFL season =

- Teams: 10
- Premiers: South Adelaide; 11th premiership
- Minor premiers: Port Adelaide; 32nd minor premiership
- Magarey Medallist: Geof Motley; Port Adelaide
- Ken Farmer Medallist: Ross Sawley; Sturt (70 Goals)

Attendance
- Matches played: 104
- Total attendance: 905,446 (8,706 per match)
- Highest: 56,353 (Grand Final, South Adelaide vs. Port Adelaide)

The 1964 South Australian National Football League season was the 85th season of the top-level Australian rules football competition in South Australia.

The competition expanded from eight to ten teams, with the addition of Central District and Woodville.

== Ladder ==
1964 SANFL Ladder
Pos	Team	Pld	W	L	D	PF	PA	PP	Pts
1	Port Adelaide	20	17	3	0	1979	1083	64.63	34
2	South Adelaide (P)	20	17	3	0	1910	1198	61.45	34
3	Sturt	20	14	6	0	1943	1535	55.87	28
4	Glenelg	20	12	6	2	1938	1609	54.64	26
5	West Torrens	20	11	8	1	1842	1592	53.64	23
6	Norwood	20	9	10	1	1571	1657	48.67	19
7	West Adelaide	20	8	12	0	1428	1541	48.10	16
8	North Adelaide	20	7	13	0	1418	1547	47.82	14
9	Woodville	20	3	17	0	1200	2188	35.42	6
10	Central District	20	0	20	0	1052	2331	31.10	0

Rules for classification: 1) points; 2) percentage; 3) number of points for.
(P) Premiers

== Finals Series ==
=== Grand Final ===
1964 SANFL Grand Final
Saturday, 3 October (2:10 pm)	Port Adelaide	def. by	South Adelaide	Adelaide Oval (crowd: 56,353)
0.5 (5); 0.10 (10); 4.12 (36); 5.12 (42)	Q1; Q2; Q3; Final	2.5 (17); 5.6 (36); 7.10 (52); 9.15 (69)
