= 1965 SANFL season =

- Teams: 10
- Premiers: Port Adelaide; 23rd premiership
- Minor premiers: Port Adelaide; 33rd minor premiership
- Magarey Medallist: Gary Window; Central District
- Ken Farmer Medallist: Ian Brewer; Norwood (96 Goals)

Attendance
- Matches played: 104
- Total attendance: 1,010,576 (9,717 per match)
- Highest: 62,543 (Grand Final, Port Adelaide vs. Sturt)

The 1965 South Australian National Football League season was the 86th season of the top-level Australian rules football competition in South Australia.

== Ladder ==
1965 SANFL Ladder
| Pos | Team | Pld | W | L | D | PF | PA | PP | Pts |
|---|---|---|---|---|---|---|---|---|---|
| 1 | Port Adelaide (P) | 20 | 17 | 3 | 0 | 1756 | 1357 | 56.41 | 34 |
| 2 | South Adelaide | 20 | 15 | 5 | 0 | 1829 | 1318 | 58.12 | 30 |
| 3 | Sturt | 20 | 13 | 7 | 0 | 1953 | 1436 | 57.63 | 26 |
| 4 | Norwood | 20 | 13 | 7 | 0 | 1932 | 1532 | 55.77 | 26 |
| 5 | North Adelaide | 20 | 13 | 7 | 0 | 1808 | 1577 | 53.41 | 26 |
| 6 | Glenelg | 20 | 10 | 10 | 0 | 1721 | 1927 | 47.18 | 20 |
| 7 | Central District | 20 | 8 | 12 | 0 | 1623 | 2020 | 44.55 | 16 |
| 8 | West Torrens | 20 | 4 | 16 | 0 | 1443 | 1867 | 43.60 | 8 |
| 9 | West Adelaide | 20 | 4 | 16 | 0 | 1516 | 1994 | 43.19 | 8 |
| 10 | Woodville | 20 | 3 | 17 | 0 | 1463 | 2016 | 42.05 | 6 |

Rules for classification: 1) points; 2) percentage; 3) number of points for.
(P) Premiers

== Finals Series ==
=== Grand Final ===
1965 SANFL Grand Final
Saturday 2 October (2:10 pm) | Port Adelaide | def. | Sturt | Adelaide Oval (crowd: 62,543)
3.3 (21); 6.3 (39); 11.7 (73); 12.8 (80) | Q1; Q2; Q3; Final | 2.1 (13); 6.2 (38); 7.2 (44); 12.5 (77) | Jack Oatey Medallist:
Goals | 6 M. Jones
G. Motley, J. Cahill | Best | T. Clarkson
