= 1977 SANFL season =

- Teams: 10
- Premiers: Port Adelaide; 24th premiership
- Minor premiers: Port Adelaide; 36th minor premiership
- Magarey Medallist: Trevor Grimwood; West Adelaide (32 votes)
- Ken Farmer Medallist: Tim Evans; Port Adelaide (87 Goals)

Attendance
- Matches played: 116
- Total attendance: 1,061,043 (9,147 per match)
- Highest: 56,717 (Grand Final, Port Adelaide vs. Glenelg)

The 1977 South Australian National Football League season was the 98th season of the top-level Australian rules football competition in South Australia and marked 100 years since the inaugural 1877 SAFA season.

== Ladder ==
1977 SANFL Ladder
Pos	Team	Pld	W	L	D	PF	PA	PP	Pts
1	Port Adelaide (P)	22	17	4	1	2804	1916	59.41	35
2	Glenelg	22	14	8	0	2676	2089	56.16	28
3	West Adelaide	22	14	8	0	2286	1898	54.64	28
4	Norwood	22	13	9	0	2533	1848	57.82	26
5	South Adelaide	22	13	9	0	2483	2243	52.54	26
6	West Torrens	22	10	12	0	1979	2458	44.60	20
7	Sturt	22	9	12	1	2242	2266	49.73	19
8	North Adelaide	22	7	14	1	2206	2736	44.64	15
9	Woodville	22	6	16	0	1950	2923	40.02	12
10	Central District	22	5	16	1	2052	2834	42.00	11

Rules for classification: 1) points; 2) percentage; 3) number of points for.
(P) Premiers

== Finals Series ==
=== Grand Final ===
1977 SANFL Grand Final
Saturday, 24 September (2:10 pm)	Port Adelaide	def.	Glenelg	Football Park (crowd: 56,717)
4.3 (27); 9.7 (61); 13.9 (87); 17.11 (113)	Q1; Q2; Q3; Final	5.2 (32); 8.3 (51); 12.6 (78); 16.9 (105)

== Events ==
- On 2 July (Round 14), Woodville player John Roberts kicks a club record 16 goals against Central Districts, as the Peckers defeat the Bulldogs 24.16 (160) to 13.8 (86)
