= 1980 SANFL season =

- Teams: 10
- Premiers: Port Adelaide; 26th premiership
- Minor premiers: Port Adelaide; 37th minor premiership
- Magarey Medallist: Russell Ebert; Port Adelaide (49 votes)
- Ken Farmer Medallist: Tim Evans; Port Adelaide (146 goals)

Attendance
- Matches played: 116
- Total attendance: 1,100,199 (9,484 per match)
- Highest: 54,536 (Grand Final, Norwood vs. Port Adelaide)

The 1980 South Australian National Football League season was the 101st season of the top-level Australian rules football competition in South Australia.

== Premiership season ==
=== Round 1 ===
	Round 1
Saturday 5 April (2:10 pm)	Sturt 16.21 (117)	def.	North Adelaide 14.10 (94)	Football Park (crowd: 10,558)
Saturday 5 April (2:10 pm)	South Adelaide 13.16 (94)	def.	Norwood 6.14 (50)	Adelaide Oval (crowd: 10,058)
Saturday 5 April (2:10 pm)	Central District 9.18 (72)	drew with	Port Adelaide 9.18 (72)	Elizabeth Oval (crowd: 15,696)
Saturday 5 April (2:10 pm)	West Torrens 16.20 (116)	def.	Woodville 14.20 (104)	Thebarton Oval (crowd: 4,544)
Saturday 5 April (2:10 pm)	West Adelaide 8.9 (57)	def. by	Glenelg 20.14 (134)	Richmond Oval (crowd: 6,550)

=== Round 2 ===
	Round 2
Saturday, 12 April (2:10 pm)	West Torrens 16.17 (113)	def.	West Adelaide 6.10 (46)	Football Park (crowd: 6,302)
Saturday, 12 April (2:10 pm)	Woodville 10.19 (79)	def. by	Sturt 30.12 (192)	Woodville Oval (crowd: 5,434)
Saturday, 12 April (2:10 pm)	Glenelg 21.17 (143)	def.	North Adelaide 17.15 (117)	Glenelg Oval (crowd: 8,685)
Saturday, 12 April (2:10 pm)	Port Adelaide 27.20 (182)	def.	Norwood 11.8 (74)	Alberton Oval (crowd: 13,352)
Sunday, 13 April (2:10 pm)	South Adelaide 13.15 (93)	def. by	Central District 13.16 (94)	Football Park (crowd: 9,611)

=== Round 3 ===
	Round 3
Saturday, 19 April (2:10 pm)	Port Adelaide 37.21 (243)	def.	Woodville 13.4 (82)	Football Park (crowd: 9,027)
Saturday, 19 April (2:10 pm)	Glenelg 24.26 (170)	def.	Central District 15.18 (108)	Glenelg Oval (crowd: 10,780)
Saturday, 19 April (2:10 pm)	Sturt 12.12 (84)	def. by	West Torrens 14.16 (100)	Unley Oval (crowd: 10,195)
Saturday, 19 April (2:10 pm)	Norwood 24.13	def.	West Adelaide 7.21 (63)	Norwood Oval (crowd: 6,321)
Saturday, 19 April (2:10 pm)	North Adelaide 10.13	def. by	South Adelaide 17.21 (123)	Prospect Oval (crowd: 5,947)
Port Adelaide's score of 37.21 (243) against Woodville is its highest in any competition.

=== Round 4 ===
	Round 4
Friday, 25 April (Time pm)	Port Adelaide 11.17 (83)	def.	South Adelaide 8.11 (59)	Football Park (crowd: 19,556)
Friday, 25 April (Time pm)	West Torrens 9.18 (72)	def.	Glenelg 8.14 (62)	Adelaide Oval (crowd: 22,709)
Saturday, 26 April (Time pm)	Norwood 16.20 (116)	def.	Central District 13.12 (90)	Football Park (crowd: 10,326)
Saturday, 26 April (Time pm)	North Adelaide 25.13 (163)	def.	Woodville 12.18 (90)	Prospect Oval (crowd: 4,456)
Saturday, 26 April (Time pm)	West Adelaide 24.13 (157)	def.	Sturt 7.19 (61)	Richmond Oval (crowd: 5,562)

=== Round 5 ===
	Round 5
Saturday, 3 May (2:10 pm)	Central District 19.15 (129)	def.	North Adelaide 17.12 (114)	Football Park (crowd: 6,837)
Saturday, 3 May (2:10 pm)	South Adelaide 18.19 (127)	def.	Sturt 18.16 (124)	Adelaide Oval (crowd: 9,861)
Saturday, 3 May (2:10 pm)	West Torrens 18.20 (128)	def.	Norwood 11.16 (82)	Thebarton Oval (crowd: 10,392)
Saturday, 3 May (2:10 pm)	Port Adelaide 28.19 (187)	def.	West Adelaide 10.10 (70)	Alberton Oval (crowd: 10,405)
Saturday, 3 May (2:10 pm)	Woodville 8.11 (59)	def. by	Glenelg 29.11 (185)	Woodville Oval (crowd: 3,981)
Tim Evans kicked a Port Adelaide record 16 goals in the match against West Adelaide.

=== Round 6 ===
	Round 6
Saturday, 10 May (2:10 pm)	West Torrens 8.7 (55)	def. by	North Adelaide 14.10 (94)	Football Park (crowd: 8,328)
Saturday, 10 May (2:10 pm)	Central District 23.12 (150)	def.	West Adelaide 16.12 (108)	Elizabeth Oval (crowd: 6,939)
Saturday, 10 May (2:10 pm)	Woodville 10.11 (71)	def. by	South Adelaide 23.12 (150)	Woodville Oval (crowd: 2,426)
Saturday, 10 May (2:10 pm)	Sturt 13.22 (100)	def.	Port Adelaide 14.12 (96)	Unley Oval (crowd: 13,829)
Saturday, 11 May (2:10 pm)	Norwood 9.13 (67)	def. by	Glenelg 14.22 (106)	Football Park (crowd: 9,473)

=== Round 7 ===
	Round 7
Saturday, 7 May (2:10 pm)	Port Adelaide 18.14 (122)	def.	Glenelg 9.6 (71)	Football Park (crowd: 18,656)
Saturday, 7 May (2:10 pm)	West Torrens 13.14 (92)	def.	South Adelaide 12.15 (87)	Adelaide Oval (crowd: 9,051)
Saturday, 7 May (2:10 pm)	Norwood 21.16 (142)	def.	Woodville 17.17 (119)	Norwood Oval (crowd: 5,201)
Saturday, 7 May (2:10 pm)	West Adelaide 17.14 (116)	def.	North Adelaide 14.15 (99)	Richmond Oval (crowd: 3,704)
Saturday, 7 May (2:10 pm)	Central District 17.17 (119)	def.	Sturt 18.8 (116)	Elizabeth Oval (crowd: 10,727)

=== Round 8 ===
	Round 8
Saturday, 24 May (2:10 pm)	North Adelaide 14.21 (105)	def.	Norwood 14.13 (97)	Football Park (crowd: 7,839)
Saturday, 24 May (2:10 pm)	South Adelaide 16.16 (112)	def.	West Adelaide 13.14 (92)	Adelaide Oval (crowd: 4,726)
Saturday, 24 May (2:10 pm)	Central District 27.20 (182)	def.	Woodville 15.15 (105)	Elizabeth Oval (crowd: 6,570)
Saturday, 24 May (2:10 pm)	Glenelg 17.20 (122)	def.	Sturt 11.13 (79)	Glenelg Oval (crowd: 12,485)
Saturday, 24 May (2:10 pm)	Port Adelaide 23.12 (150)	def.	West Torrens 9.6 (60)	Alberton Oval (crowd: 18,703)

=== Round 9 ===
	Round 9
Saturday, 31 May (2:10 pm)	Glenelg 20.16 (136)	def.	South Adelaide 15.12 (102)	Football Park (crowd: 8,084)
Saturday, 31 May (2:10 pm)	Port Adelaide 27.16 (178)	def.	North Adelaide 8.8 (56)	Alberton Oval (crowd: 9,635)
Saturday, 31 May (2:10 pm)	West Adelaide 13.22 (100)	def.	Woodville 13.10 (88)	Woodville Oval (crowd: 2,459)
Saturday, 31 May (2:10 pm)	West Torrens 16.14 (110)	def.	Central District 13.14 (92)	Thebarton Oval (crowd: 8,220)
Saturday, 31 May (2:10 pm)	Sturt 16.14 (110)	def.	Norwood 13.16 (94)	Unley Oval (crowd: 9,935)

=== Round 10 ===
	Round 10
Saturday, 7 June (2:10 pm)	Port Adelaide 12.16 (88)	def.	Central District 11.18 (84)	Football Park (crowd: 16,854)
Saturday, 7 June (2:10 pm)	North Adelaide 23.17 (155)	def.	Sturt 15.15 (105)	Prospect Oval (crowd: 10,055)
Saturday, 7 June (2:10 pm)	Norwood 25.15 (165)	def.	South Adelaide 7.7 (49)	Norwood Oval (crowd: 7,100)
Saturday, 7 June (2:10 pm)	Glenelg 23.15 (153)	def.	West Adelaide 16.13 (109)	Glenelg Oval (crowd: 7,002)
Sunday, 8 June (2:10 pm)	Woodville 15.8 (98)	def.	West Torrens 12.14 (86)	Football Park (crowd: 4,950)

=== Round 11 ===
	Round 11
Saturday, 16 June (2:10 pm)	Port Adelaide 23.16 (154)	def.	Norwood 9.10 (64)	Football Park (crowd: 17,667)
Saturday, 16 June (2:10 pm)	North Adelaide 6.12 (48)	def. by	Glenelg 18.15 (123)	Prospect Oval (crowd: 8,079)
Saturday, 16 June (2:10 pm)	Central District 14.14 (98)	def.	South Adelaide 11.13 (79)	Elizabeth Oval (crowd: 8,194)
Saturday, 16 June (2:10 pm)	Sturt 13.20 (98)	def.	Woodville 13.6 (84)	Unley Oval (crowd: 5,570)
Saturday, 16 June (2:10 pm)	West Adelaide 10.8 (68)	def. by	West Torrens 18.14 (122)	Richmond Oval (crowd: 5,177)

=== Round 12 ===
	Round 12
Saturday, 21 June (2:10 pm)	Glenelg 17.14 (116)	def.	Central District 15.15 (105)	Football Park (crowd: 10,353)
Saturday, 21 June (2:10 pm)	South Adelaide 26.13 (169)	def.	North Adelaide 13.7 (85)	Adelaide Oval (crowd: 5,056)
Saturday, 21 June (2:10 pm)	West Adelaide 15.13 (103)	def. by	Norwood 14.20 (104)	Richmond Oval (crowd: 4,366)
Saturday, 21 June (2:10 pm)	Port Adelaide 25.13 (163)	def.	Woodville 17.10 (112)	Alberton Oval (crowd: 7,425)
Saturday, 21 June (2:10 pm)	West Torrens 12.19 (91)	def. by	Sturt 19.17 (131)	Thebarton Oval (crowd: 7,910)

=== Round 13 ===
	Round 13
Saturday, 28 June (2:10 pm)	Norwood 10.18 (78)	def.	Central District 8.9 (75)	Football Park (crowd: 6,046)
Saturday, 28 June (2:10 pm)	Woodville 17.16 (118)	def.	North Adelaide 9.12 (66)	Woodville Oval (crowd: 2,045)
Saturday, 28 June (2:10 pm)	West Torrens 9.16 (70)	def. by	Glenelg 16.12 (108)	Thebarton Oval (crowd: 5,261)
Saturday, 28 June (2:10 pm)	South Adelaide 8.5 (53)	def. by	Port Adelaide 21.21 (147)	Adelaide Oval (crowd: 7,979)
Saturday, 28 June (2:10 pm)	Sturt 25.22 (172)	def.	West Adelaide 16.11 (107)	Unley Oval (crowd: 4,842)

=== Round 14 ===
	Round 14
Saturday, 12 July (2:10 pm)	West Torrens 14.18 (102)	def.	Norwood 9.16 (70)	Football Park (crowd: 9,811)
Saturday, 12 July (2:10 pm)	Central District 14.14 (98)	def.	North Adelaide 12.17 (89)	Elizabeth Oval (crowd: 6,716)
Saturday, 12 July (2:10 pm)	Glenelg 26.17 (173)	def.	Woodville 13.19 (97)	Glenelg Oval (crowd: 5,761)
Saturday, 12 July (2:10 pm)	Sturt 19.22 (136)	def.	South Adelaide 15.14 (104)	Unley Oval (crowd: 8,163)
Sunday, 13 July (2:10 pm)	Port Adelaide 26.19 (175)	def.	West Adelaide 12.12 (84)	Football Park (crowd: 9,347)

=== Round 15 ===
	Round 15
Saturday 19 July (2:10 pm)	Port Adelaide 22.17 (149)	def.	Sturt 13.8 (86)	Football Park (crowd: 22,116)
Saturday 19 July (2:10 pm)	South Adelaide 16.26 (122)	def.	Woodville 13.14 (92)	Adelaide Oval (crowd: 2,731)
Saturday 19 July (2:10 pm)	Norwood 12.18 (90)	def. by	Glenelg 18.14 (122)	Norwood Oval (crowd: 8,549)
Saturday 19 July (2:10 pm)	North Adelaide 19.10 (124)	def.	West Torrens 14.12 (96)	Prospect Oval (crowd: 6,151)
Saturday 19 July (2:10 pm)	West Adelaide 15.13 (103)	def. by	Central District 18.13 (121)	Richmond Oval (crowd: 4,015)

=== Round 16 ===
	Round 16
Saturday 26 July (2:10 pm)	Sturt 16.24 (120)	def.	Central District 14.16 (100)	Football Park (crowd: 9,341)
Saturday 26 July (2:10 pm)	Glenelg 14.26 (110)	def.	Port Adelaide 12.14 (86)	Glenelg Oval (crowd: 16,373)
Saturday 26 July (2:10 pm)	Woodville 14.22 (106)	def. by	Norwood 15.17 (107)	Woodville Oval (crowd: 3,494)
Saturday 26 July (2:10 pm)	North Adelaide 20.12 (132)	def. by	West Adelaide 20.14 (134)	Prospect Oval (crowd: 4,062)
Saturday 26 July (2:10 pm)	West Torrens 15.10 (100)	def.	South Adelaide 8.13 (61)	Thebarton Oval (crowd: 4,370)

=== Round 17 ===
	Round 17
Saturday 2 August (2:10 pm)	South Adelaide 20.16 (136)	def.	West Adelaide 14.11 (95)	Football Park (crowd: 3,070)
Saturday 2 August (2:10 pm)	Woodville 17.17 (119)	def.	Central District 14.8 (92)	Woodville Oval (crowd: 3,411)
Saturday 2 August (2:10 pm)	West Torrens 16.11 (107)	def. by	Port Adelaide 25.13 (163)	Thebarton Oval (crowd: 9,328)
Saturday 2 August (2:10 pm)	Sturt 15.19 (109)	def.	Glenelg 13.20 (98)	Unley Oval (crowd: 11,618)
Saturday 2 August (2:10 pm)	Norwood 15.20 (110)	def.	North Adelaide 11.11 (77)	Norwood Oval (crowd: 6,881)

=== Round 18 ===
	Round 18
Saturday 9 August (2:10 pm)	North Adelaide 10.10 (70)	def. by	Port Adelaide 26.16 (172)	Football Park (crowd: 9,245)
Saturday 9 August (2:10 pm)	Central District 10.15 (75)	def. by	West Torrens 25.18 (168)	Elizabeth Oval (crowd: 8,083)
Saturday 9 August (2:10 pm)	Norwood 22.14 (146)	def.	Sturt 15.12 (102)	Norwood Oval (crowd: 11,425)
Saturday 9 August (2:10 pm)	Glenelg 23.13 (151)	def.	South Adelaide 15.19 (109)	Glenelg Oval (crowd: 6,589)
Saturday 9 August (2:10 pm)	West Adelaide 20.15 (135)	def.	Woodville 11.12 (78)	Richmond Oval (crowd: 2,311)

=== Round 19 ===
	Round 19
Saturday 16 August (2:10 pm)	West Adelaide 18.12 (120)	def. by	Glenelg 22.24 (156)	Football Park (crowd: 5,472)
Saturday 16 August (2:10 pm)	South Adelaide 15.16 (106)	def. by	Norwood 18.11 (119)	Adelaide Oval (crowd: 9,487)
Saturday 16 August (2:10 pm)	Port Adelaide 22.17 (149)	def.	Central District 8.10 (58)	Alberton Oval (crowd: 11,602)
Saturday 16 August (2:10 pm)	Woodville 14.8 (92)	def. by	West Torrens 22.20 (152)	Woodville Oval (crowd: 4,419)
Sunday 17 August (2:10 pm)	North Adelaide 19.14 (128)	def. by	Sturt 18.21 (129)	Football Park (crowd: 6,654)

=== Round 20 ===
	Round 20
Saturday 23 August (2:10 pm)	Woodville 16.16 (112)	def. by	Sturt 24.16 (160)	Football Park (crowd: 4,573)
Saturday 23 August (2:10 pm)	Central District 15.18 (108)	def.	South Adelaide 16.4 (100)	Elizabeth Oval (crowd: 4,729)
Saturday 23 August (2:10 pm)	Norwood 9.9 (63)	def. by	Port Adelaide 17.16 (118)	Norwood Oval (crowd: 16,309)
Saturday 23 August (2:10 pm)	North Adelaide 11.22 (88)	def. by	Glenelg 27.18 (180)	Prospect Oval (crowd: 5,247)
Saturday 23 August (2:10 pm)	West Torrens 16.11 (107)	def. by	West Adelaide 21.13 (139)	Thebarton Oval (crowd: 4,624)

=== Round 21 ===
	Round 21
Saturday 30 August (2:10 pm)	West Torrens 19.12 (126)	def.	Sturt 13.20 (98)	Football Park (crowd: 10,581)
Saturday 30 August (2:10 pm)	South Adelaide 14.12 (96)	def. by	North Adelaide 24.17 (161)	Adelaide Oval (crowd: 3,168)
Saturday 30 August (2:10 pm)	Port Adelaide 20.30 (150)	def.	Woodville 11.9 (75)	Alberton Oval (crowd: 6,813)
Saturday 30 August (2:10 pm)	Glenelg 22.20 (152)	def.	Central District 16.12 (108)	Glenelg Oval (crowd: 6,777)
Saturday 30 August (2:10 pm)	West Adelaide 12.21 (93)	def. by	Norwood 19.18 (132)	Richmond Oval (crowd: 4,890))

=== Round 22 ===
	Round 22
Saturday 6 September (2:10 pm)	West Torrens 11.16 (82)	def. by	Glenelg 15.12 (102)	Football Park (crowd: 11,673)
Saturday 6 September (2:10 pm)	Port Adelaide 21.23 (149)	def.	South Adelaide 10.17 (77)	Alberton Oval (crowd: 8,245)
Saturday 6 September (2:10 pm)	Norwood 24.13 (157)	def.	Central District 18.16 (124)	Norwood Oval (crowd: 6,990)
Saturday 6 September (2:10 pm)	North Adelaide 21.10 (136)	def. by	Woodville 22.16 (148)	Prospect Oval (crowd: 3,193)
Saturday 6 September (2:10 pm)	Sturt 31.20 (206)	def.	West Adelaide 12.11 (83)	Unley Oval (crowd: 5,905))

== Ladder ==
1980 SANFL Ladder
Pos	Team	Pld	W	L	D	PF	PA	PP	Pts
1	Port Adelaide (P)	22	19	2	1	3176	1687	65.31	39
2	Glenelg	22	19	3	0	2872	2004	58.90	38
3	Sturt	22	13	9	0	2635	2471	51.61	26
4	West Torrens	22	13	9	0	2255	2130	51.43	26
5	Norwood	22	12	10	0	2284	2310	49.72	24
6	Central District	22	9	12	1	2264	2552	47.01	19
7	South Adelaide	22	8	14	0	2208	2421	47.70	16
8	North Adelaide	22	6	16	0	2274	2726	45.48	12
9	West Adelaide	22	6	16	0	2182	2895	42.98	12
10	Woodville	22	4	18	0	2128	3113	40.60	8

Rules for classification: 1) points; 2) percentage; 3) number of points for.
(P) Premiers

== 1980 SANFL Finals ==
=== Week 1 ===
	Elimination and qualifying Finals
Saturday, 13 September (2:10 pm)	West Torrens 12.11 (83)	def. by	Norwood 18.20 (128)	Football Park (crowd: 24,892)
Sunday, 14 September (2:10 pm)	Glenelg 13.12 (90)	def. by	Sturt 16.23 (119)	Football Park (crowd: 23,813)

=== Week 2 ===
	Semi-finals
Saturday, 20 September (2:10 pm)	Glenelg 8.11 (59)	def. by	Norwood 13.18 (96)	Football Park (crowd: 27,923)
Sunday, 21 September (2:10 pm)	Port Adelaide 24.20 (164)	def.	Sturt 15.11 (101)	Football Park (crowd: 37,386)

=== Week 3 ===
	Preliminary Final
Saturday, 27 September (2:10 pm)	Sturt 14.16 (100)	def. by	Norwood 17.14 (116)	Football Park (crowd: 31,228)

=== Week 4 (1980 SANFL Grand Final) ===
1980 SANFL Grand Final
Saturday, 4 October (2:10pm)	Port Adelaide	def.	Norwood	Football Park (crowd: 54,536)
3.1 (19); 5.7 (37); 6.11 (47); 11.15 (81)	Q1; Q2; Q3; Final	4.3 (27); 5.6 (36); 7.9 (51); 9.9 (63)	National anthem: God Save the Queen
Norwood were leading by 4 points at the halfway mark of the last quarter but Port Adelaide eventually prevailed by 18.

== Attendances ==
=== By Club ===
1980 SANFL Attendances
Club	Total	Games	Avg. Per Game
Port Adelaide	371,884	23	16,169
Norwood	334,545	25	13,382
Sturt	299,766	25	11,991
Glenelg	261,893	24	10,912
West Torrens	215,638	23	9,376
Central District	188,871	22	8,585
South Adelaide	150,038	22	6,820
North Adelaide	142,541	22	6,479
West Adelaide	118,051	22	5,366
Woodville	100,839	22	4,584

== Awards and events ==
=== Awards ===
Mark of the Year - Michael Farquhar

=== Events ===
- On 3 May (Round 5), Port Adelaide player Tim Evans kicks a club record 16 goals, as the Magpies defeat West Adelaide 28.19 (187) to 10.10 (70).
