= 1982 SANFL season =

- Teams: 10
- Premiers: Norwood; 25th premiership
- Minor premiers: Port Adelaide; 38th minor premiership
- Magarey Medallist: Tony McGuinness; Glenelg (44 votes)
- Ken Farmer Medallist: Tim Evans; Port Adelaide (125 Goals)

Attendance
- Matches played: 116
- Total attendance: 1,002,774 (8,645 per match)
- Highest: 47,336 (Grand Final, Norwood vs. Glenelg)

The 1982 South Australian National Football League season was the 103rd season of the top-level Australian rules football competition in South Australia.

== Ladder ==
1982 SANFL Ladder
Pos	Team	Pld	W	L	D	PF	PA	PP	Pts
1	Port Adelaide	22	16	5	1	2626	2073	55.88	33
2	Norwood (P)	22	15	7	0	2749	2114	56.53	30
3	Sturt	22	15	7	0	3010	2333	56.34	30
4	Glenelg	22	13	8	1	2826	2411	53.96	27
5	Central District	22	13	9	0	2839	2435	53.83	26
6	West Adelaide	22	13	9	0	2816	2602	51.97	26
7	North Adelaide	22	10	12	0	2663	2697	49.68	20
8	South Adelaide	22	8	14	0	2124	2375	47.21	16
9	West Torrens	22	5	17	0	2030	3274	38.27	10
10	Woodville	22	1	21	0	2047	3416	37.47	2

Rules for classification: 1) points; 2) percentage; 3) number of points for.
(P) Premiers

== Finals series ==
=== Grand Final ===
1982 SANFL Grand Final
Sunday, 2 October (2:10pm)	Norwood	def.	Glenelg	Football Park (crowd: 47,336)
3.3 (21); 7.5 (47); 11.8 (74); 20.13 (133)	Q1; Q2; Q3; Final	2.2 (14); 3.7 (25); 6.14 (50); 9.17 (71)
