= Jackson Trengove =

Australian rules footballer

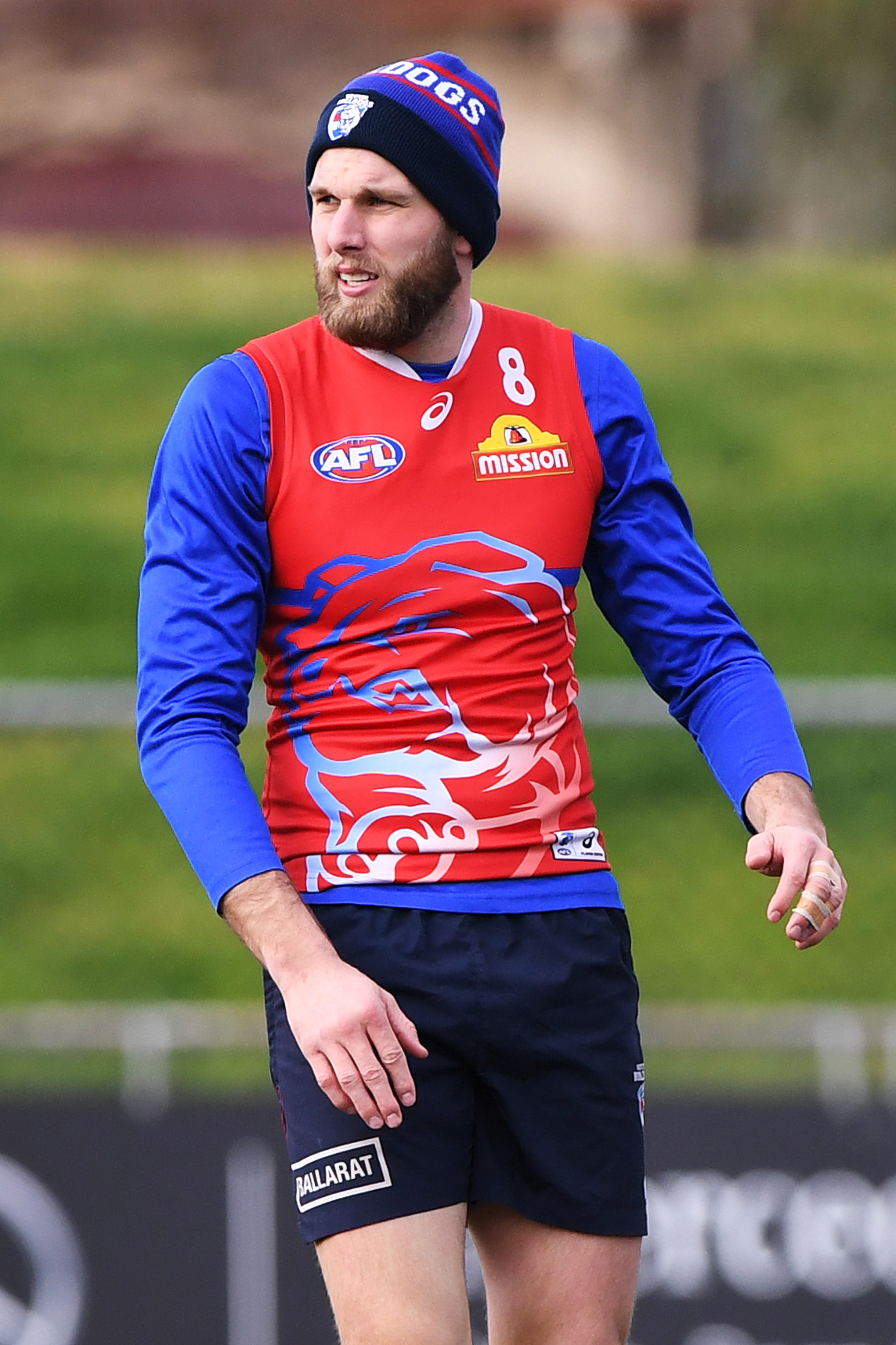
- Trengove in August 2018

Personal information
- Full name: Jackson Trengove
- Born: 2 November 1990 (age 36)
- Original team: Calder Cannons (TAC Cup)
- Height: 197 cm (6 ft 6 in)
- Weight: 97 kg (214 lb)
- Position: Utility

Playing career^{1}
Years	Club	Games (Goals)
2010–2017	Port Adelaide	153 (30)
2018–2020	Western Bulldogs	33 (5)
Total		186 (35)
- ^{1} Playing statistics correct to the end of 2019–2020.

Career highlights
- John Cahill Medal: 2011; 22under22 team: 2012; Gavin Wanganeen Medal: 2010; AFL Rising Star nominee: 2010

Jackson Trengove (born 2 November 1990) is a former professional Australian rules footballer who played for the Port Adelaide Football Club and Western Bulldogs in the Australian Football League (AFL).

== AFL career ==
=== Port Adelaide (2008–2017) ===
Port Adelaide used their second-round pick, number 22, to draft Trengove in 2008. He was initially aligned to the Port Adelaide Magpies in the SANFL having been taken at pick #5 in the SANFL Mini Draft.

After a difficult climb back from his injury, Trengove made his AFL debut in the opening round of the 2010 season after playing in the 2010 NAB Cup. His defensive pressure was evident as he had 4 tackles. Trengove played in rounds one to four of the 2010 season as a tall defender and ruckman, but was omitted from the Power's round 5 clash against top-placed St Kilda. He returned to Power's AFL side in round 7 when they defeated Essendon at Etihad Stadium. This was arguably Trengove's best match so far, as he collected 11 disposals, 8 hit-outs, 6 tackles, 1 goal and 3 marks (one of them with seconds to go which ensured the team's win). He backed up his efforts with another strong performance the following round, achieving a career high 12 hit-outs. In the Power's Round 20 clash against the West Coast Eagles, Trengove totaled a current career-high 23 disposals, along with a game-saving late game spoil, which earned him the Rising Star nomination for that round. His 2010 season was recognised with the Gavin Wanganeen Medal as the club's best player under the age of 21.

In 2011, Jackson played every game for the Power. Also in 2011, there was a lot of speculation that Trengove would leave the club and move back to his home state of Victoria because of the current on-field and off-field dramas that were unfolding with the Power. He later dismissed these rumours when he signed a 2-year contract with the Power on the Monday after round 21. He along with Travis Boak were jointly crowned the John Cahill Medallist at season's end, the first time that there had been a tie at the club's best and fairest award.

Trengove's importance to the club was illustrated in 2014. From the time he was injured just before half time in the second Showdown against the Crows - which Port had held the lead and top spot on the AFL ladder - to his point of return a month later, Port had lost four of five games.

Trengove had another injury interrupted season in 2015 and as a result was never quite able to produce the sort of football that had previously seen him as a dominant presence in the back half. He underwent shoulder surgery in January and sat out all of the trial matches but returned in time to take his place for Port's round one game. He then hurt his ankle in round 8 against Richmond and missed several games mid season before a shoulder reconstruction saw his year ended in round 20.

=== Western Bulldogs (2018–2020) ===
At the conclusion of the 2017 season, Trengove joined the Western Bulldogs as a restricted free agent. Trengove retired at the conclusion of the 2020 AFL season, after 33 games for the club over his three years at the club.
