= Romano Negri =

Australian rules footballer

Personal information
- Full name: Romano Negri
- Born: 30 September 1964 (age 62)
- Original team: Woodville (SANFL)
- Height: 204 cm (6 ft 8 in)
- Weight: 104 kg (229 lb)

Playing career^{1}
Years	Club	Games (Goals)
1987–90	Woodville (SANFL)	74 (19)
1991–92	Adelaide (AFL)	6 (0)
- ^{1} Playing statistics correct to the end of 1995.

Career highlights
- Weller Arnold Medallist 1986; SANFL debut with Woodville in 1987; Woodville Best & Fairest 1988; Woodville Club Captain 1989–90; AFL debut with Adelaide on 22 March 1991 v Hawthorn at Football Park; Adelaide Crows Inaugural Team member v Hawthorn at Football Park

Romano Negri (born 30 September 1964) is a former professional Australian rules footballer who played for the Adelaide Football Club in the Australian Football League (AFL).

Negri played initially for North Hobart in Tasmania and won a Weller Arnold Medal in 1986 after performing well at intrastate level. The following year he moved to Woodville and won the South Australian National Football League (SANFL) club's 'Best and Fairest' award in 1988 and also made his debut in interstate football for South Australia that year including starting at full-forward in an exhibition game against Western Australia at the BC Place stadium, then the world's largest indoor stadium located in Vancouver, Canada.

A ruckman standing at 204 centimetres (6 ft 8.3 in), he has the distinction of being Woodville's last captain, leading the club in 1989 and 1990 before they merged with West Torrens to become the Woodville-West Torrens Eagles.

When he joined Adelaide in 1991, Negri became the club's then tallest player and the AFL's 3rd tallest player behind Essendon's Paul Salmon and Carlton's Justin Madden who both stand at 206 centimetres (6 ft 9.1 in) tall. A foundation player for Adelaide, he played in their first five AFL games in 1991 and was awarded two Brownlow Medal votes for his 11 hit-outs and 13 disposals in a win over Sydney at the SCG. He made just one more appearance, the opening round of the 1992 AFL season.
