= Kevin Abley =

Australian rules footballer (1935–2024)

Personal information
- Full name: Kevin Charles Abley
- Born: 24 March 1935; Box Hill, Victoria, Australia
- Died: 29 August 2024 (aged 89); Adelaide, South Australia, Australia

Playing career^{1}
Years	Club	Games (Goals)
1954–1964	Glenelg	173 (96)
- ^{1} Playing statistics correct to the end of 1964.

Kevin Abley (24 March 1935 – 29 August 2024) was an Australian rules footballer who played in the South Australian National Football League with the Glenelg Football Club.

Kevin Abley was born on 24 March 1935, in Box Hill, Victoria, Australia. He came to Adelaide in the early stages of 1950 when he was 15 years of age. He lived with his family which included his brother, Port Adelaide Football Club legend John Abley. He played 173 games for Glenelg, mainly at full-back and represented South Australia on four occasions in interstate matches against Victoria. His grandson Blake Derer currently coaches the Hackham Hawks football club Senior A grade men's football team.

Abley died on 29 August 2024, at the age of 89.
