= Ralph Sewer =

Personal information
- Full name: Ralph Stewart Sewer
- Nickname: Zip Zap
- Born: 13 September 1951 (age 75)
- Height: 174 cm (5 ft 9 in)
- Weight: 79 kg (12 st 6 lb)

Playing career
Years	Club	Games (Goals)
1969–1980, 1985–1990	Woodville	325 (396)
1981–1984	Glenelg	57 (64)
Total		382 (460)

Representative team honours
Years	Team	Games (Goals)
	South Australia	12 (5)

Career highlights
- South Australian Football Hall of Fame (2002); Woodville Best & Fairest (1978); Woodville Leading goal kicker (1972, 1975); Woodville Life member (1978); SANFL Life member (1978)

Ralph Sewer is a retired fireman and Australian rules footballer who played for Woodville and Glenelg in the South Australian National Football League. Sewer played 12 matches for South Australia. Sewer is also the only player to have played in four decades of football in SANFL.

In 2012, Malcolm Blight placed him on the forward flank in his "Squad of Champions", which listed (in his opinion) the 22 greatest players he had ever coached during is career. Sewer was the only player on the list who had never played in the VFL/AFL.
