= 1970 SANFL season =

91st season of the South Australian National Football League

- Teams: 10
- Premiers: Sturt; 10th premiership
- Minor premiers: Port Adelaide; 34th minor premiership
- Magarey Medallist: Barrie Robran; North Adelaide (24 votes)
- Ken Farmer Medallist: Fred Phillis; Glenelg (107 Goals)

Attendance
- Matches played: 103
- Total attendance: 970,767 (9,425 per match)
- Highest: 48,757 (Grand Final, Sturt vs. Glenelg)

The 1970 South Australian National Football League season was the 91st season of the top-level Australian rules football competition in South Australia.

== Ladder ==
1970 SANFL Ladder
Pos	Team	Pld	W	L	D	PF	PA	PP	Pts
1	Port Adelaide	20	17	2	1	2219	1475	60.07	35
2	Sturt (P)	20	17	3	0	2209	1508	59.43	34
3	North Adelaide	20	12	8	0	2104	1709	55.18	24
4	Glenelg	20	11	9	0	2108	2039	50.83	22
5	Norwood	20	10	8	2	1872	1872	50.00	22
6	West Adelaide	20	8	11	1	1478	1775	45.43	17
7	Central District	20	7	13	0	1722	1873	47.90	14
8	West Torrens	20	7	13	0	1841	2016	47.73	14
9	Woodville	20	6	14	0	1621	2193	42.50	12
10	South Adelaide	20	3	17	0	1492	2206	40.35	6

Rules for classification: 1) points; 2) percentage; 3) number of points for.
(P) Premiers

== Finals Series ==
=== Grand Final ===
1970 SANFL Grand Final
Saturday, 26 September (2:10 pm)	Sturt	def.	Glenelg	Adelaide Oval (crowd: 48,757)
1.4 (10); 4.6 (30); 8.10 (58); 12.13 (85)	Q1; Q2; Q3; Final	3.6 (24); 4.8 (32); 5.10 (40); 9.10 (64)
