= Jack McCarthy (football coach) =

Australian football coach (1911/12–??)

H. John McCarthy (1911 or 1912 – ), best known as Jack McCarthy or "Snow" was an Australian rules footballer in the state of South Australia, best known as a coach for the Port Adelaide Colts and for North Adelaide, who won the 1960 SANFL premiership under his guidance.

== Career ==
McCarthy played half forward for South Adelaide from 1931 to 1934 and West Adelaide in 1936. He was forced to retire in 1937 as his employer, (Pope Products Ltd), would not give him leave to attend afternoon training sessions.

In 1946 Bob Quinn asked McCarthy to coach the Port Colts, training ground for most of the Port Adelaide league team. The team subsequently won 51 of their 58 games.

He succeeded Lew Roberts as coach of the Port Adelaide League team in 1949, but resigned, (to make way for Fos Williams according to one account) or in another report, the club wished to make a permanent appointment and made an offer to South Adelaide's Jim Deane, but South Adelaide refused to release him, and Williams was their second choice.

In the three years he was coach of the Colts (1950, 1951, and 1952), they took the flag twice and were runners-up in the other season. and 1954 was his tenth year as coach of the Colts.

McCarthy was coach of the Port Adelaide "B" (seconds) team in 1959 when they won the premiership, and North Adelaide in 1960, when he was credited with imbuing the team with an enthusiasm that was missing earlier; and the team's grand final win of that year. Rated rank outsiders, they won by 13 points in a close-fought game.

His retirement in 1962 was marked with a photograph in the Port Adelaide Standard. He received the Pepsi award for 1962.

== Family ==
McCarthy married; they had three sons

- Graham McCarthy (born c. 1939)
