= Roger Clift =

Australian rules footballer

Roger William Clift

Personal information
- Born: 19 June 1931; Jamestown, South Australia
- Died: 11 May 1971 (aged 39)
- Original team: Jamestown
- Position: Centre half back

Playing career
Years	Club	Games (Goals)
1948–1957	Port Adelaide	155 (66)

Representative team honours
Years	Team	Games (Goals)
	South Australia	5

Career highlights
- 4x Port Adelaide premiership player (1954, 1955, 1956, 1957); Port Adelaide best and fairest (1954); Port Adelaide leading goal-kicker (1952)

Roger William Clift (1931–1971) was an Australian rules footballer for the Port Adelaide during the 1950s. He was part of four of the club's six premierships in a row and won the club's best and fairest in the first of those in 1954. Football historian John Devaney describes Roger Clift as "One of those players who seems blessed with a total disregard for personal safety". Clift died of a heart attack at a young age, while playing squash. He is interred at the Centennial Park Cemetery in Pasadena, South Australia.
