= 1959 SANFL season =

- Teams: 10
- Premiers: Port Adelaide; 20th premiership
- Minor premiers: Port Adelaide; 28th minor premiership
- Magarey Medallist: Len Fitzgerald; Sturt
- Ken Farmer Medallist: Wally Dittmar; Port Adelaide (74 goals)

Attendance
- Matches played: 76
- Total attendance: 863,466 (11,361 per match)
- Highest: 48,884 (Grand Final, Port Adelaide vs. West Adelaide)

The 1959 South Australian National Football League season was the 80th season of the top-level Australian rules football competition in South Australia.

By winning the 1959 SANFL Grand Final, Port Adelaide set the Australian record of six consecutive Grand Final victories in a top level state competition when it defeated West Adelaide by 10 points.

== Ladder ==
1959 SANFL Ladder
Pos	Team	Pld	W	L	D	PF	PA	PP	Pts
1	Port Adelaide (P)	18	17	1	0	1935	1213	61.47	34
2	West Adelaide	18	12	6	0	1864	1335	58.27	24
3	Sturt	18	10	8	0	1798	1663	51.95	20
4	Glenelg	18	10	8	0	1709	1738	49.58	20
5	West Torrens	18	9	9	0	1528	1525	50.05	18
6	Norwood	18	7	11	0	1552	1717	47.48	14
7	North Adelaide	18	4	14	0	1340	1783	42.91	8
8	South Adelaide	18	3	15	0	1217	1969	38.20	6

Rules for classification: 1) points; 2) percentage; 3) number of points for.
(P) Premiers

== Finals Series ==
=== Grand Final ===
1959 SANFL Grand Final
Saturday, 3 October (2:10 pm)	Port Adelaide	def.	West Adelaide	Adelaide Oval (crowd: 48,884)
5.1 (31); 9.5 (59); 11.8 (74); 13.9 (87)	Q1; Q2; Q3; Final	1.5 (11); 3.5 (23); 7.9 (51); 11.11 (77)
