= Tom Garland (Port Adelaide footballer) =

Australian rules footballer

Thomas Garland

Personal information
- Full name: Thomas Edward Garland
- Died: 22 July 2021 (aged 94)

Playing career
Years	Club	Games (Goals)
1945	West Torrens	1
1952–1958	Port Adelaide	136 (86)

Career highlights
- Port Adelaide leading goalkicker (1954)

Thomas Edward Garland was an Australian rules footballer for West Torrens and Port Adelaide. His father, also Tom Garland, was a notable trade unionist.
