= Ken Aplin =

Australian rules football umpire (1918–2004)

Kenneth Aplin (1918 – 25 February 2004) was a leading field umpire in the South Australian National Football League (SANFL) between 1939 and 1954.

Aplin umpired 291 SANFL matches, including 10 Grand Finals. He was the regular 'independent' umpire in the Western Australia versus Victoria matches.

Aplin was the SANFL umpires' coach between 1955 and 1957 and umpired in the South Australian Amateur Football League (SAAFL).

After retiring as an umpire, he was a football commentator on Adelaide radio for 18 years, and also a television football panellist.

Aplin was inducted in the Australian Football Hall of Fame in 1996.

On 16 January 2001, Aplin was awarded the Australian Sports Medal for service to the SANFL and Australian Football in South Australia.
