= Harold McDonald (footballer, born 1925) =

Australian rules footballer

Personal information
- Full name: Harold Albert McDonald
- Born: 28 July 1925
- Died: 13 May 2001 (aged 78)
- Original team: Birkenhead
- Height: 170 cm (5 ft 7 in)
- Weight: 67 kg (148 lb)

Playing career^{1}
Years	Club	Games (Goals)
1949–1958	Port Adelaide	140 (9)
- ^{1} Playing statistics correct to the end of 1958.

Career highlights
- 5x Port Adelaide premiership player (1951, 1954, 1955, 1956, 1957); Port Adelaide best and fairest (1953)

Harold Albert McDonald (28 July 1925 – 13 May 2001) was an Australian rules footballer who played with Port Adelaide in the South Australian National Football League.

Prior to his football career, McDonald served in the Australian Army during World War II.
