= 1979 SANFL Grand Final =

Port Adelaide	South Adelaide
9.9 (63)	3.14 (32)
	1	2	3	4
PA	5.0 (30)	5.3 (33)	9.7 (61)	9.9 (63)
STH	0.0 (0)	3.7 (25)	3.8 (26)	3.14 (32)
- Date: Saturday, 29 September (2:10 pm)
- Stadium: Football Park
- Attendance: 50,428

The 1979 SANFL Grand Final was an Australian rules football competition. Port Adelaide beat South Adelaide by 63 to 32. There was a strong breeze, and all goals were scored at the same end. South kicked one goal against the breeze during run of play but the player Clarke kicking at goal was awarded a free kick and the goal disallowed. His free kick fell well short of the goals as it a real howler. Last quarter the breeze swung around 180 degrees and the contest was over.

As of 2025, this was South Adelaide's last Grand Final appearance.
