= Tim Evans (footballer) =

Australian rules footballer (born 1953)

Personal information
- Born: 13 August 1953 (age 73); Tasmania
- Original team: Penguin (NWFU)
- Height: 189 cm (6 ft 2 in)
- Weight: 96 kg (212 lb)
- Positions: Full forward, half back

Playing career^{1}
Years	Club	Games (Goals)
1971–1974	Geelong	59 (26)
1975–1986	Port Adelaide	230 (993)
Total		289 (1019)

Representative team honours
Years	Team	Games (Goals)
1979–1983	South Australia	10 (41)
- ^{1} Playing statistics correct to the end of 1986.

Career highlights
- Club: Port Adelaide's greatest team (full-forward); 4× Port Adelaide Premiership Player (1977, 1979, 1980, 1981); 2nd SANFL all-time goalkicker (993); 1st All-Time goals kicked for Port Adelaide (993); 6× SANFL leading goal-kicker (1977, 1978, 1980, 1981, 1982, 1984); 10× Port Adelaide leading goal-kicker (1975, 1977, 1978, 1979, 1980, 1981, 1982, 1983, 1984, 1985); Representative: 10 games for South Australia; Honours: South Australian Football Hall of Fame (2002); Tasmanian Football Hall of Fame (2008); SANFL life member (1984); Port Adelaide life member (1984)

Tim Evans (born 13 August 1953) is a former Australian rules football player who played for Port Adelaide in the South Australian National Football League (SANFL) and Geelong in the Victorian Football League (VFL).

== Early life ==
Originally from Tasmania, Evans played for Penguin Football Club in the North West Football Union.

== Geelong (1971–1974) ==
Evans was recruited by Geelong in 1971, where he spent four seasons at half back.

== Port Adelaide (1975–1986) ==
In 1975, he joined Port Adelaide and went on to play 230 games for the club. He won the club's goalkicking with 64 that year.

After a season used in defence, he was moved to full forward in 1977 by coach John Cahill and was an immediate success, leading the league with 88 goals, including seven in Port Adelaide's Grand Final win over Glenelg. He repeated the performance in 1978, kicking 90 for the season.

Evans first kicked over 100 goals in 1980 when he kicked a then-SANFL record 146 goals, and won the league's inaugural Ken Farmer Medal in 1981 kicking 98 for the season.

Evans retired at the end of the 1986 season. He had kicked 993 goals, the second highest total in SANFL history behind North Adelaide's Ken Farmer (who kicked 1417 between 1929 and 1941), and 1019 in his career.

Evans also kicked 51 goals in 18 in pre-season/night series matches, and kicked 41 goals in 10 matches in interstate football matches for South Australia, for a total of 317 career senior matches and 1111 career senior goals.

He played in Port Adelaide's 1977 and 1979–81 premiership teams as well as playing full back in the losing 1976 Grand Final to Sturt in front of the SANFL record crowd of 66,897 at Football Park, and also in the losing 1984 Grand Final.

Evans topped the SANFL's goalkicking six times, and was Port's leading goalkicker ten times.

== Honours ==
He was an inaugural inductee into the South Australian Football Hall of Fame in 2002 and was inducted into the Tasmanian Football Hall of Fame in 2008.
Tim Evans is also a Port Adelaide Life Member, an SANFL player Life Member (for having played 200 games) and was selected at full forward in Port Adelaide's Greatest Team of players from 1870 to 2000.
In 2026, Tim Evans was inducted into the Australian Football Hall of Fame.
