= 1962 SANFL Grand Final =

Port Adelaide	West Adelaide
8.10 (58)	7.13 (55)
	1	2	3	4
PTA	1.3 (9)	4.4 (28)	7.7 (49)	8.10 (58)
WA	0.4 (4)	3.7 (25)	5.11 (41)	7.13 (55)
- Date: Saturday, 29 September (2:10 pm)
- Stadium: Adelaide Oval
- Attendance: 43,597

The 1962 SANFL Grand Final was an Australian rules football competition. Port Adelaide beat West Adelaide 8.10 58 to 7.13 55.

It was Port Adelaide's 21st SANFL premiership.
