= 1963 SANFL Grand Final =

| Port Adelaide | North Adelaide |
|---|---|
| 11.14 (80) | 6.11 (47) |
| | 1 | 2 | 3 | 4 |
|---|---|---|---|---|
| PTA | 5.8 (32) | 5.9 (33) | 7.9 (51) | 11.14 (80) |
| NTH | 1.1 (7) | 5.4 (34) | 5.9 (39) | 6.11 (47) |
- Date: Saturday, 5 October (2:10 pm)
- Stadium: Adelaide Oval
- Attendance: 52,688

The 1963 SANFL Grand Final was an Australian rules football competition. Port Adelaide beat North Adelaide 80 to 47.
