= 1951 SANFL Grand Final =

| Port Adelaide | North Adelaide |
|---|---|
| 10.12 (72) | 8.13 (61) |
| | 1 | 2 | 3 | 4 |
|---|---|---|---|---|
| PTA | 6.4 (40) | 8.5 (53) | 9.9 (63) | 10.12 (72) |
| NTH | 2.1 (13) | 4.6 (30) | 4.9 (33) | 8.13 (61) |
- Date: Saturday, 29 September (2:10 pm)
- Stadium: Adelaide Oval
- Attendance: 41,997

Accolades
- Best on Ground: Allen Greer; Peter Marrett

The 1951 SANFL Grand Final was an Australian rules football championship match. Port Adelaide beat North Adelaide 72 to 61.
