= 1959 SANFL Grand Final =

- Official match program.

West Adelaide	Port Adelaide
11.11 (77)	13.9 (87)
	1	2	3	4
WA	1.5 (11)	3.5 (23)	7.9 (51)	11.11 (77)
PTA	5.1 (31)	9.5 (59)	11.8 (74)	13.9 (87)
- Date: Saturday, 3 October (2:10 pm)
- Stadium: Adelaide Oval
- Attendance: 48,884

The 1959 SANFL Grand Final was an Australian rules football match played at Adelaide Oval on 3 October 1959 to conclude the 1959 SANFL season. Port Adelaide beat West Adelaide 87 to 77 to claim their 20th SANFL premiership. This was Port Adelaide's sixth consecutive SANFL Grand Final victory, setting a senior Australian rules football record for most consecutive premierships.

== Scorecard ==
1959 SANFL Grand Final
Saturday, 3 October 1959 (2:10 pm)	Port Adelaide	def.	West Adelaide	Adelaide Oval (crowd: 48,884)
5.1 (31); 9.5 (59); 11.8 (74); 13.9 (87)	Q1; Q2; Q3; Final	1.5 (11); 3.5 (23); 7.9 (51); 11.11 (77)
