= 1957 SANFL Grand Final =

Port Adelaide	Norwood
15.15 (105)	13.16 (94)
	1	2	3	4
PTA	2.5 (17)	7.8 (50)	10.12 (72)	15.15 (105)
NOR	4.5 (29)	9.9 (60)	11.12 (78)	13.16 (94)
- Date: Saturday, 28 September (2:10 pm)
- Stadium: Adelaide Oval
- Attendance: 61,924

The 1957 SANFL Grand Final was an Australian rules football competition. Port Adelaide beat Norwood 105 to 94.
