= 1956 SANFL Grand Final =

Port Adelaide	West Adelaide
12.9 (81)	9.11 (65)
	1	2	3	4
PTA	3.2 (20)	4.5 (29)	8.8 (56)	12.9 (81)
WA	1.5 (11)	4.8 (28)	5.9 (39)	9.11 (65)
- Date: Saturday, 29 September (2:10 pm)
- Stadium: Adelaide Oval
- Attendance: 45,514

The 1956 SANFL Grand Final was an Australian rules football competition. Port Adelaide beat West Adelaide 81 to 65.
