= 1958 SANFL Grand Final =

West Adelaide	Port Adelaide
14.8 (92)	14.10 (94)
	1	2	3	4
WA	3.0 (18)	8.3 (51)	13.6 (84)	14.8 (92)
PTA	4.3 (27)	7.5 (47)	11.8 (74)	14.10 (94)
- Date: Saturday, 3 October (2:10 pm)
- Stadium: Adelaide Oval
- Attendance: 54,282

The 1958 SANFL Grand Final was an Australian rules football competition. Port Adelaide beat West Adelaide 94 to 92.

West Adelaide missed a chance to win when a shot hit the goal post with 90 seconds left to play. That night, four West Adelaide players (including Neil Kerley) broke into Adelaide Oval and chopped down the offending goal post.
