= 1955 SANFL Grand Final =

Port Adelaide	Norwood
15.11 (101)	5.8 (38)
	1	2	3	4
PTA	4.2 (26)	5.5 (35)	7.6 (48)	15.11 (101)
NOR	0.1 (1)	3.5 (23)	4.7 (27)	5.8 (38)
- Date: Saturday, 1 October (2:10 pm)
- Stadium: Adelaide Oval
- Attendance: 44,826

The 1955 SANFL Grand Final was an Australian rules football championship game. Port Adelaide beat Norwood 101 to 38.
