= Woodville Football Club =

Names
- Full name: Woodville Football Club
- Nickname(s): Woodpeckers (1963–1982); Warriors (1983–1990)
- Club song: Come on ya Peckers, (1963-1982); We're the Warriors from Woodville (1983-1990)

1990 season
- Leading goalkicker: Allen Jakovich (101)
- Best and fairest: John Klug

Club details
- Founded: 1938
- Dissolved: 1990 (Merged)
- Colours: Green and Gold
- Competition: SAAFL Div A2 1940-1941; SAAFL Div A1 1946-1958; SANFL Reserves 1959-1963; SANFL 1964-90
- President: -
- Coach: -
- Captain: -
- Premierships: SAAFL Div A1 - 1946; SAAFL Div A2 - 1941
- Ground: Woodville Oval (1941–1990)

Uniforms
Home

The Woodville Football Club, nicknamed the Woodpeckers and later the Warriors, was an Australian rules football club that competed in the South Australian National Football League (SANFL) from 1964 to 1990, when it merged in 1991 with the West Torrens Football Club to form the Woodville-West Torrens Eagles.

Based in the inner north western suburbs of Adelaide, South Australia, Woodville Football Club derived its name from the suburb Woodville and local government area City of Woodville that it was located in.

The club's lack of success was unparalleled in the Victorian Football League (VFL) or West Australian Football League (WAFL) with the club receiving 9 wooden spoons, including 6 times in succession 1980-1985, in 27 years whilst only making the finals 3 times without a grand final appearance.

== Club history ==
There are newspaper references to a Woodville Football Club dating back to the 19th century, when Woodville and Adelaide were the only teams, but the modern club was formed in 1938 to play in local amateur competitions.

In 1940, the club was admitted into the Amateur League Grade A2.

In 1959 the existing SANFL clubs agreed to submissions from Woodville and Central District to expand the competition from eight to ten teams on the proviso they enter the SANFL reserves competition on a five-year apprenticeship before gaining admission to the league competition in 1964. The team was then known as the "Woodville Woodpeckers" and reached the reserve finals once, in 1960, for a third place finish. The highlights of this apprenticeship were Bob Simunsen's successive Seconds Magarey Medal wins in 1961 and 1962. He was also runner up in the award twice in 1960 and 1963. In Woodville's first year he won the 1959 Tomkins Medal (Senior Colts U19s). Commentator Bruce McAvaney played for Woodville's U/19 team at the same time Craig Bradley played the team woodpecker mascot (as a 6 year old).

In 1964, Simunsen at age 22 would become the Club's captain for its inaugural senior season in the SANFL. The club won just three matches, all against fellow newcomer Central District. Following the inaugural season it collected the wooden spoon in 1965. In its 27 seasons in the SANFL, the club collected a total of 9 SANFL wooden spoons including 6 in succession from 1980 to 1985 (a SANFL record at the time.). Woodville reached the finals only three times: in 1979, 1986 and 1987; its best result was 3rd position in 1986. Out of a total of 575 matches the club had 160 wins and 4 draws.

Woodville's most successful player was Malcolm Blight, who won the SANFL's Magarey Medal and gained selection in the All Australian team in 1972. He would later play for North Melbourne Football Club in the Victorian Football League (VFL), winning the Brownlow Medal in 1978 and joining a select group of players who had won the highest individual honour in both the (SANFL) and (VFL) competitions.

Blight returned to Woodville in 1983 as Captain-Coach, leading the club through its most successful period. His first season back in Adelaide was unsuccessful, with the club finishing with the wooden spoon. From there the team started to gel and by 1986 was considered an outside chance of obtaining their first league premiership, but finished 3rd after losing to eventual premiers Glenelg in the Preliminary Final. They also made the finals in 1987, but came 5th, losing the Elimination Final to Glenelg.

Blight stood down at the end of 1987 and was replaced by Port Adelaide Football Club legend and four time Magarey Medallist Russell Ebert. Under Ebert's coaching, Woodville won the South Australian National Football League (SANFL) Night Competition in 1988, the Escort Cup, defeating Port Adelaide 14.12 (96) to 7.9 (51) at Football Park. It would be the last trophy the Woodville Football Club would win in the South Australian National Football League (SANFL). Woodville had also won the Coca-Cola Cup series in 1972, a competition between clubs which did not make the final four.

As a struggling club with limited fans and finances, there were regular calls throughout the 1980s to merge Woodville with another club. In 1990, with the imminent entry of the South Australian-based Adelaide Crows into the national Australian Football League (formerly the VFL), Woodville and the neighbouring West Torrens Football Club both decided to amalgamate at the end of the season. In an apt moment, Woodville (in 8th Place with 6 wins) and West Torrens (in 9th Place also with 6 wins) were scheduled to play each other in their respective final games of the 1990 season, with Woodville emerging victorious by 50 points, 24.10 (154) to 15.19 (104) at the Adelaide Oval. Before the game a number of legends from both clubs were introduced to the crowd.

Woodville's captain in their last game was popular veteran Ralph Sewer (regular captain Romano Negri was in the team but stepped aside for the last game to give Sewer the honor). The 38-year-old Sewer who was playing his 382nd and last game of SANFL football. "Zip Zap" as he was known, made his league debut with Woodville in 1969 and was playing his 325th game for the club. He was Woodville's leading goal kicker in 1975, and had won the club's best & Fairest award in 1978, the same year he was awarded with Life Membership from the club and Player Life Membership from the SANFL. Sewer, who had played 57 games for perennial contenders Glenelg from 1981–84, is the only player to have played in four decades of football in the SANFL.

The Woodville Warriors and the West Torrens Eagles merged after the completion of the 1990 season and have since participated in the SANFL as the Woodville-West Torrens Eagles, winning the SANFL premiership in 1993, 2006, 2011, 2020, and 2021.

== Awards ==
Premierships

- SANFL League: Nil
- SANFL Night Premierships: 1 - 1988. (Also, in 1972 they won the Coca-Cola cup, a competition between teams which did not make the final four).
- SANFL Reserves: 2 - 1973, 1987
- SANFL Under 19's: Nil
- SANFL Under 17's: 5 - 1962, 1964, 1967, 1968, 1973
- SAAFL Division A1 - 1946
- SAAFL Division A2 - 1941

Magarey Medalists

- Malcolm Blight (1972)

SANFL leading goalkickers

- Glynn Hewitt: 83 goals (1979)
- Malcolm Blight: 126 goals (1985)
- Stephen Nichols: 103 goals (1986, 1988)

South Australian Football Hall of Fame members

- Barrie Barbary (2002)
- Malcolm Blight (2002)
- Ralph Sewer (2002)
- Ray Huppatz (2003)
- Andrew Rogers (2005)
- Bob Simunsen (2006)
- Bill Sanders (2011)

== Club colours and emblems ==
- Red and White (1938–1939)
- Purple and White (1940–1946)
- Green and Gold (1947–1990)

On entry to the SANFL, Woodville were nicknamed "The Woodpeckers" from 1964 to 1982 and then were nicknamed "The Warriors" from 1983 to 1990.

=== Uniforms ===
1964-1967	1968-1982	1983-1990

=== Club Songs ===
First Club Song

(Sung to the tune of The Woody Woodpecker Song)

Come on ya Peckers
Come on ya Peckers
It's our Woody Woodpeckers song
Come on ya Peckers
Come on ya Peckers
And we're yelling it all day long

We're the green and gold
And we're brave and bold
And we fight right to the end
And we never say die
As we aim for the sky
Determined to make it the trend

Come on ya Peckers
Come on ya Peckers
It's our Woody Woodpeckers song
Come on ya Peckers
Come on ya Peckers
And we're yelling it all day long

Cos we never give in
For we know it's a sin
So we lift our game to win
Come on ya Peckers
Come on ya Peckers
It's the theme we all join in

Come on ya Peckers
Come on ya Peckers
It's our Woody Woodpeckers song
Come on ya Peckers
Come on ya Peckers
And we're yelling it all day long

We're the green and gold
And we're brave and bold
And we fight right to the end
And we never say die
As we aim for the sky
Determined to make it the trend

Come on ya Peckers
Come on ya Peckers
It's our Woody Woodpeckers song
Come on ya Peckers
Come on ya Peckers
And we're yelling it all day long

Cos we never give in
For we know it's a sin
So we lift our game to win
Come on ya Peckers
Come on ya Peckers
It's the theme we all join in

We're the green and gold
And we're brave and bold
And we fight right to the end
And we never say die
As we aim for the sky
Determined to make it the trend

Come on ya Peckers
Come on ya Peckers
It's our Woody Woodpeckers song
Come on ya Peckers
Come on ya Peckers
And we're yelling it all day long

Cos we never give in
For we know it's a sin
So we lift our game to win
Come on ya Peckers
Come on ya Peckers
It's the theme we all join in

Second Club Song

(Sung to the tune of The Yankee Doodle Boy (I'm A Yankee Doodle Dandy)

We're the Warriors from Woodville
The Woodville Warriors, we are
Australia's colours mighty green and gold
The flag is our aim to unfold
The Premiership is what we aim for
Determination will be there
Let's give a cheer for it's our year
As one we shall achieve it
For we are the mighty Warriors

== Club records ==
Highest Score	29.11 (185) v West Torrens, Round 19, 1982, Thebarton Oval
Lowest Score	2.5 (17) v Port Adelaide, Round 19, 1967, Alberton Oval
Greatest Winning Margin	117 points v West Torrens, Round 15, 1985, Football Park
Greatest Losing Margin	170 points v Glenelg, Round 18, 1971, Glenelg Oval
Lowest Winning Score	9.10 (64) v South Adelaide 7.11 (53), Round 19, 1971, Woodville Oval; 8.16 (64) v Sturt 8.8 (56), Round 15, 1987, Adelaide Oval
Highest Losing Score	23.10 (148) v West Adelaide 29.16 (190), Round 17, 1984, Richmond Oval

- Home Ground: Woodville Oval (1941–90) (SANFL league games 1964-90)
- Record Attendance at Woodville Oval: 11,026 v Port Adelaide in Round 18, 1986
- Record Attendance: 39,066 v Port Adelaide at Football Park, 1986 SANFL 1st Semi-final
- Most Games: 325 by Ralph Sewer (1969–80, 1984–90)
- Most Goals in a Season: 126 by Malcolm Blight in 1985
- First player to kick 100 goals in an SANFL season: Trevor Pierson (1982 - 104 goals)
- Most Years as Coach: 5 by Malcolm Blight (1983–87)

== Famous players ==
- Ralph Sewer: Debuting in 1969 and playing his final match in 1990 aged 38, Sewer became not only the only man to have played in the SANFL in four different decades, but also the only grandfather. His 325 games was a club record.
- Barrie Barbary
- Malcolm Blight
- Richard Champion
- Ray Huppatz
- Allen Jakovich
- John Klug
- Romano Negri
- John Roberts
- Bob Simunsen
- Andrew Rogers
- Des O’Dwyer.
