= Aber =

Aber may refer to:

== Places ==
- Aber and Inver (placename elements)
- Aber, Ceredigion, in the community of Llanwenog, Wales
- Aber, Powys, Wales
- Abergavenny, Monmouthshire, Wales
- Abergwyngregyn, Wales, popularly known by the short form "Aber"
- Aberystwyth, Wales, popularly known by the short form "Aber"

== Transport ==
- Aber railway station, on the Rhymney Line serving the town of Caerphilly, south Wales, UK
- Aber railway station (Gwynedd), disused railway station on the North Wales Coast Line in Caernarfonshire, Wales, UK

== Other uses ==
- Aber (name), a given name and surname
- Aber (software), an optics design and analysis application
- Aberystwyth University, sometimes colloquially known as "Aber"

== See also ==
- Aber Isle, a small island in Loch Lomond, Scotland
