= Aber (name) =

Aber is a German-originated name that can be a surname or a given name. Notable people with the name include:

- Aber Whitcomb (born 1977), American CTO and co-founder of MySpace
- Adolf Aber (1893–1960), German musicologist and music critic
- Al Aber (1927–1993), left-handed Major League Baseball pitcher
- Aria Aber (born 1991), American poet
- Ita Aber (1932–2025), American artist and curator
- Jessica Aber (1981–2025), American lawyer and United States Attorney
- John Aber (fl. after 1976), American ecologist and professor
- Lillian Aber (born 1987), Ugandan politician and public administrator
- Maribel Aber (born 1973), American business journalist
- Ted Aber (1914–1989), American historian and historic preservation activist

== See also ==
- Aber (disambiguation)
