= Abler =

Abler is a surname. Notable people with the surname include:

- Ronald F. Abler (born 1939), American geographer
- William Abler (fl. 1989–2005), American paleontologist

== See also ==
- Aber (name)
- Abley
- Adler (surname)
