= Feeding ecology of Tyrannosaurus =

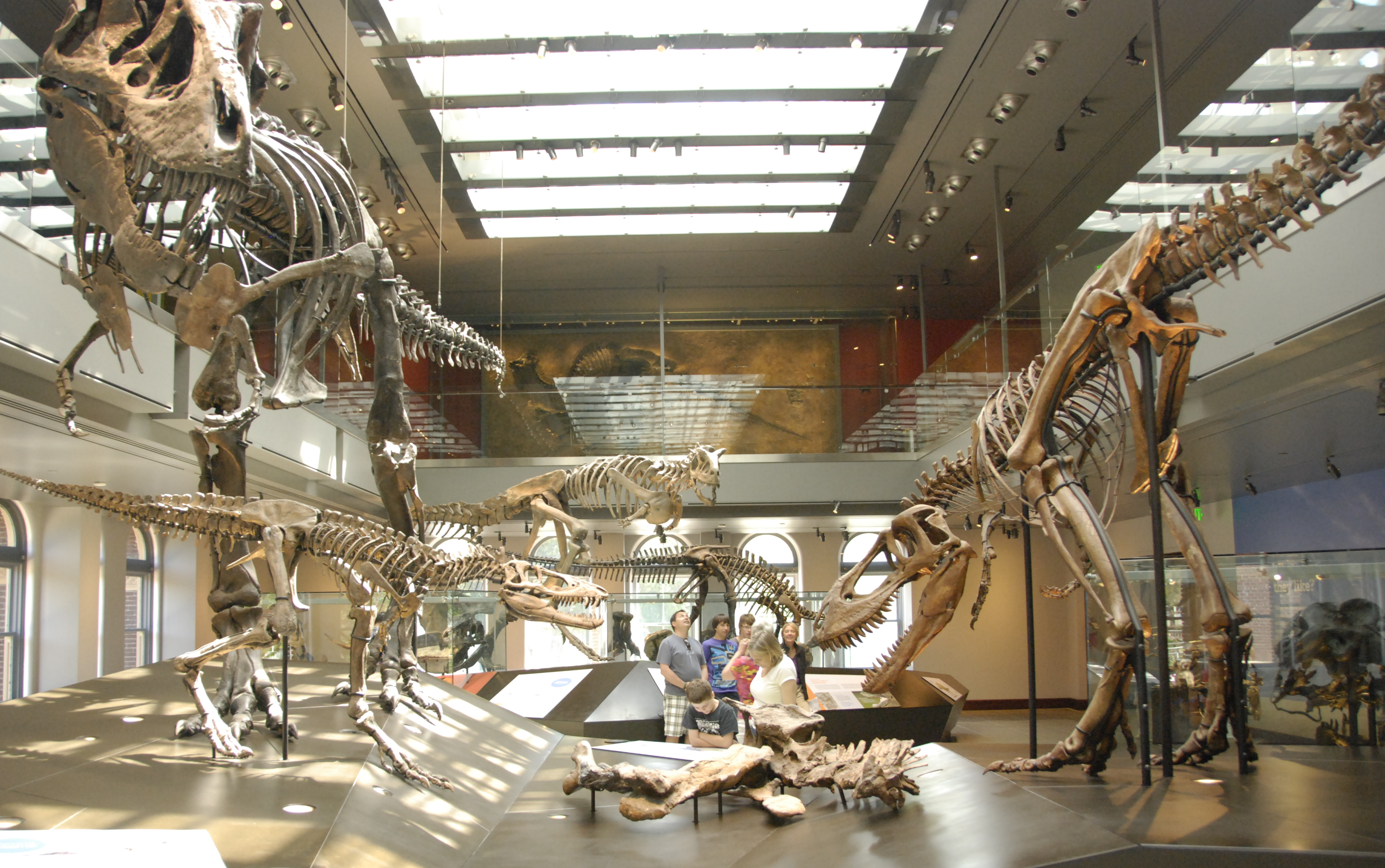
Mounted skeletons of different age groups, Los Angeles Natural History Museum

The feeding behaviour of Tyrannosaurus rex has been studied extensively. The well known attributes of T. rex (its jaws, legs and overall body design) are often interpreted to be indicative of either a predatory or scavenging lifestyle, and as such the biomechanics, feeding strategies and diet of Tyrannosaurus have been subject to much research and debate.

== Feeding ==
Like other tyrannosaurids, Tyrannosaurus rex is known to have been carnivorous due primarily to the shape of the teeth. A study conducted by Miriam Reichel of the University of Alberta found that the tyrannosaurs' dissimilar teeth had different uses depending on their size, placement, serrated edge and angle in the mouth. While the teeth at the front were specially designed for gripping and pulling, the teeth at the side of the jaw were meant to puncture, and the teeth at the back were specialized both to slice pieces of prey and to force the slices into the throat. She also proposed that the banana-shaped teeth of Tyrannosaurus rex were designed to withstand the strain of violently struggling prey which would otherwise snap teeth that were sharp, flat and knife-like.

In a study made by Stephan Lautenschlager and colleagues comparing Tyrannosaurus to fellow theropods Allosaurus and Erlikosaurus, it was calculated that Tyrannosaurus was capable of a maximum jaw gape of around 80 degrees; this enormous jaw gape was a necessary adaptation for a wide range of jaw angles to power the creature's strong bite.

A study by Emily J. Rayfield from the University of Bristol further supported that Tyrannosaurus used the puncture and pull feeding strategy, where the Tyrannosaurus would startle its prey with a powerful bite and then drag its teeth back through its prey's flesh and bone. The study found that Tyrannosaurus had a bony skull that was well-adapted to withstand biting and shearing forces, with strong nasal bones that helped it withstand compression and shearing stresses and lacrimal bones that enabled the skull to withstand a variety of stresses. Her study also found that the maxilla jugal sutures found in Tyrannosaurus cheeks acted as shock absorbers. These joints had soft tissue that absorbed some of the stresses encountered when biting. This traded some of the skull's durability in return for enabling it to better protect the surrounding bones from damage when biting. The study also found that the skull redirected much of the strain from biting to the Tyrannosaurus skull's robust nasal bones.

In his 2013 lecture, Thomas R. Holtz Jr. stated that fused nasal bones and the presence of incisors were some of the unique traits of Tyrannosaurus and its relatives. He stated that most reptiles do not have incisors, having teeth at the front of the jaw that are similar to those in the rest of the jaw, and suggested that these incisors were used to scrape the meat from bones. He also stated that Tyrannosaurus teeth were different from previous theropods because they were thick from side to side, and while the teeth of many other theropods had roots just as long as the crown, the teeth of Tyrannosaurus had roots that were twice as long as the crowns. He further states that the teeth of Tyrannosaurus didn't look like they were for cutting, but instead looked like they were for pulverizing, crushing and piercing.

In 2012, a study of the jaws of Tyrannosaurus by biomechanical expert Karl Bates of the University of Liverpool and paleontologist Peter Falkingham of the Royal Veterinary College, London, and Brown University was published in Biology Letters. Bates and Falkingham used computer modeling to reconstruct Tyrannosaurus's skull and relevant jaw musculature based on anatomical research on crocodilians and birds. From these reconstructions, it was estimated that Tyrannosaurus was likely capable of exerting a bite force of between 35 and 57 kN (kilonewtons) (7,800–12,700 pounds force), around ten times as great as the strongest alligator bite. However, other, heavier predators, such as the crocodilian Deinosuchus and the giant shark megalodon, surpassed this bite in strength, having bite forces of about 100 kN and 180 kN respectively. The study also revealed that a juvenile Tyrannosaurus had a bite force of no more than 880 pounds force, or 3.9 kN, and that the bite became more powerful as the animal matured. This also supports the theory that juvenile Tyrannosaurus hunted different prey in a form of niche partitioning so as to avoid competition with the adults.

Additionally, research done by Greg Erikson and Paul Gignac et al. and published in the journal Scientific Reports indicates that Tyrannosaurus could bite down with around 8,000 pounds force (36 kN) when feeding, exerting a pressure of 431,000 pounds per square inch (3 gigapascals) with their teeth. This adaptation allowed Tyrannosaurus to drive open cracks present in bone during repetitive, mammal-like biting and produce high-pressure fracture arcades, leading to catastrophic explosions of some bones and allowing the theropod to fully exploit the carcasses of other dinosaurs such as hadrosaurs and ceratopsians, giving it access to the mineral salts and marrow within bone that other carnivores in the same environment could not take advantage of.

Studies published in 2019 on hadrosaur vertebrae from the Hell Creek Formation that were punctured by the teeth of what appears to be a late-stage juvenile Tyrannosaurus indicate that despite lacking the bone-crushing adaptations of the adults, young individuals were still capable of using the same bone-puncturing feeding technique as their adult counterparts. The bite force of a juvenile Tyrannosaurus was later calculated to be around 5.6 kN based on these puncture marks and others on another juvenile Tyrannosaurus in a study published in 2021.

== Scavenging ==
The debate about whether Tyrannosaurus was an active predator or a pure scavenger is as old as the debate about its locomotion. Lambe (1917) described a good skeleton of Tyrannosaurus's close relative Gorgosaurus and concluded that it and therefore also Tyrannosaurus was a pure scavenger, because the Gorgosaurus teeth showed hardly any wear. This argument is no longer taken seriously, because theropods replaced their teeth quite rapidly. Ever since the first discovery of Tyrannosaurus most scientists have speculated that it was a predator; like modern large predators it would readily scavenge or steal another predator's kill if it had the opportunity.

Paleontologist Jack Horner has been a major advocate of the idea that Tyrannosaurus was exclusively a scavenger and did not engage in active hunting at all, though Horner himself has claimed that he never published this idea in the peer reviewed scientific literature and used it mainly as a tool to teach a popular audience, particularly children, the dangers of making assumptions in science (such as assuming T. rex was a hunter) without using evidence. Nevertheless, Horner presented several arguments in the popular literature to support the pure scavenger hypothesis:

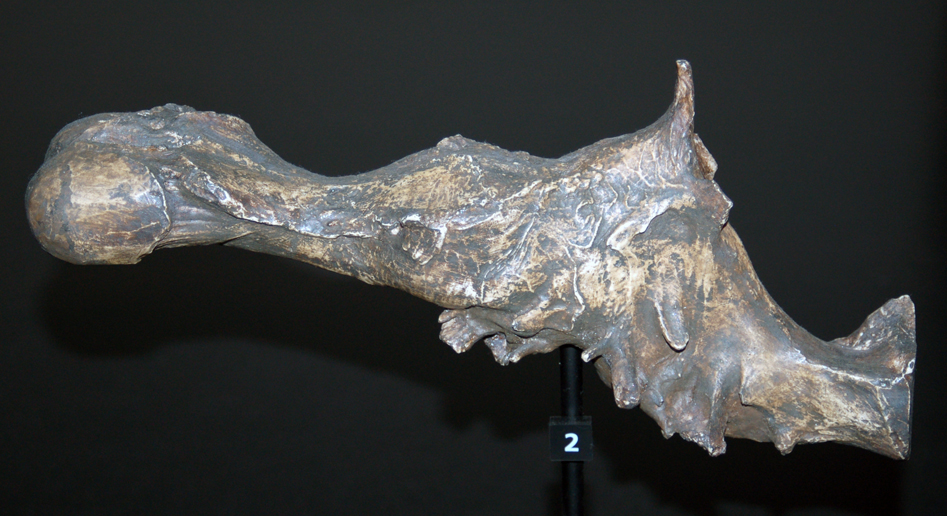
Cast of the braincase at the Australian Museum, Sydney

- Tyrannosaur arms are short when compared to other known predators. Horner argues that the arms were too short to make the necessary gripping force to hold on to prey. Other paleontologists such as Thomas Holtz Jr. and James Farlow, however, gave examples of animals that do not use their forelimbs to hunt such as wolves, seriemas and secretarybirds. Holtz later stated that the use of forelimbs are not the only viable way of prey capture giving examples of modern predators such as canids and hyaenids (hyenas). He also cited other extinct animals such as the Diatryma (also known as Gastornis) and Phorusrhacids. Gregory S. Paul cited thylacines as another example.
- Tyrannosaurus had large olfactory bulbs, suggesting a highly developed sense of smell which could sniff out carcasses over great distances, as modern vultures do. Because vultures are primarily scavengers, it has been suggested that such a highly developed sense of smell may imply that tyrannosaurs were as well. However, Farlow and Holtz have noted that a good sense of smell could also be used to detect live prey as well as for behaviors unrelated to food acquisition. Darla K. Zelenitsky, Francois Therrien and Yoshitsugu Kobayashi also discussed the Tyrannosaurus's sense of smell in their 2009 study and stated that it was not an indication of a particular feeding strategy the animal was using (predator versus scavenger), but indicate that tyrannosaurids such as Tyrannosaurus were active during low light conditions and may have used their sense of smell to search for food and navigate through large home ranges. In a 2013 lecture, Holtz also noted that like Tyrannosaurus, wolves and raptors such as Velociraptor also had a good sense of smell. Others have argued that the primary scavenger hypothesis is implausible because the only modern pure scavengers are large gliding birds, which use their keen senses and energy-efficient gliding to cover vast areas economically. However, researchers from Glasgow concluded that an ecosystem as productive as the current Serengeti would provide sufficient carrion for a large theropod scavenger, although the theropod might have had to be cold-blooded in order to get more calories from carrion than it spent on foraging (see Metabolism of dinosaurs). They also suggested that modern ecosystems like Serengeti have no large terrestrial scavengers because gliding birds now do the job much more efficiently, while large theropods did not face competition for the scavenger ecological niche from gliding birds. However, further research by the same scientists found that the evolution of a terrestrial obligate scavenger was unlikely (read more on Ruxton & Houson's 2004 study below).
- Tyrannosaur teeth could crush bone, and therefore could extract as much food (bone marrow) as possible from carcass remnants, usually the least nutritious parts. Karen Chin and colleagues have found bone fragments in coprolites (fossilized feces) that they attribute to tyrannosaurs, but point out that a tyrannosaur's teeth were not well adapted to systematically chewing bone like hyenas do to extract marrow. Gregory Paul also wrote that a bone-crushing bite would also have been advantageous to a predator; providing the extreme bite force to kill prey and later consume it efficiently. Other paleontologists would also find similarities between Tyrannosaurus teeth and those of other predators. Farlow and Holtz pointed out that like Tyrannosaurus, orcas and crocodiles also had broad-based teeth. Holtz noted the similarities between Tyrannosaurus teeth and those of hyaenids, but further added that all hyaenids are known to kill prey, with the largest (Crocuta crocuta) obtaining most of its food through this means. He also notes that hyaenids mainly crunch bone with their molars and premolars. Holtz also pointed out that felids also developed thickened teeth as adaptations to resist contact with bone during prey capture or dispatch as well as during feeding.
- Since at least some of Tyrannosaurus's potential prey could move quickly, evidence that it walked instead of ran could indicate that it was a scavenger. On the other hand, recent analyses suggest that Tyrannosaurus, while slower than large modern terrestrial predators, may well have been fast enough to prey on large hadrosaurs and ceratopsians.

Other evidence suggests hunting behavior in Tyrannosaurus. The eye-sockets of tyrannosaurs are positioned so that the eyes would point forward, giving them binocular vision slightly better than that of modern hawks. Horner also pointed out that the tyrannosaur lineage had a history of steadily improving binocular vision. It is not obvious why natural selection would have favored this long-term trend if tyrannosaurs had been pure scavengers, which would not have needed the advanced depth perception that stereoscopic vision provides. In modern animals, binocular vision is found mainly in predators.

A 2021 study focusing on the vision and hearing of the small theropod Shuvuuia, to which the tyrannosaurid Alioramus was compared suggests that Alioramus was a diurnal animal and would have hunted or scavenged predominantly during daylight hours, a feature it shared with the dromaeosaurid Dromaeosaurus, which was also compared to Shuvuuia in the study.

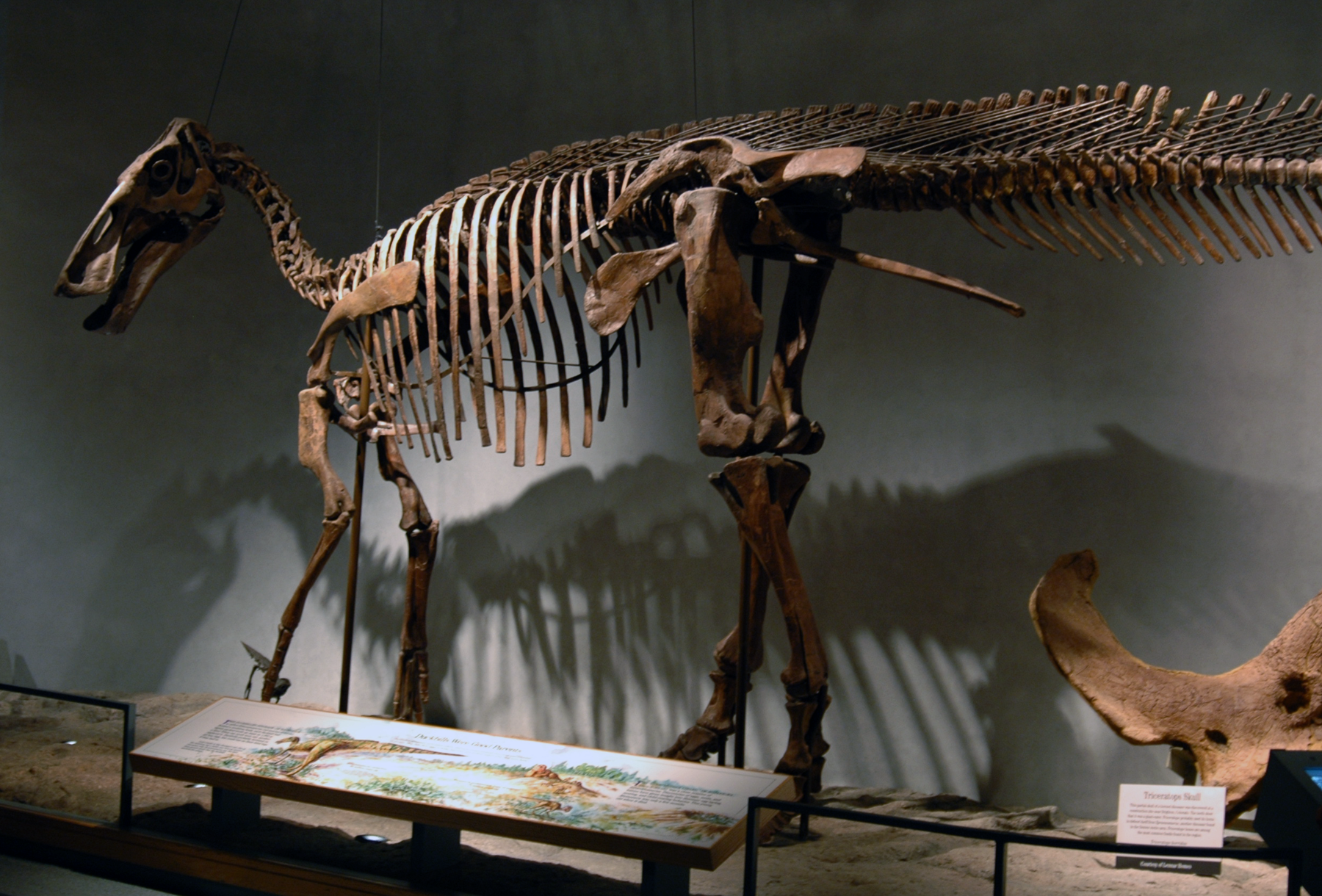
The damage to the tail vertebrae of this Edmontosaurus annectens skeleton (on display at the Denver Museum of Nature and Science) indicates that it may have been bitten by a Tyrannosaurus

Furthermore, fossil evidence of tyrannosaur attacks on other dinosaurs have been discovered. A pair of hadrosaur caudal (tail) vertebrae found in 2007 was described by David Burnham et al. in 2013 has the tip of an adult Tyrannosaurus tooth embedded in the bone, with evidence of new bone growth that wrapped around the tooth. Burnham and his colleagues suggest that this Edmontosaur had also survived a tyrannosaur attack and that this was further proof that Tyrannosaurus were predators. Kenneth Carpenter (1998) had also described another specimen of the hadrosaurid Edmontosaurus annectens (in some newspapers it is misidentified as the similar Hadrosaurus) from Montana as having healed supposed tyrannosaur-inflicted damage on its tail vertebrae; having some of its caudal neural spines mutilated. The fact that the damage seems to have healed suggests that the Edmontosaurus survived a tyrannosaur's attack on a living target, i.e. the tyrannosaur had attempted active predation; however, the damage is ambiguous and not directly attributable to Tyrannosaurus. Another Edmontosaur specimen that is suspected to have survived a tyrannosaur attack had also been previously identified by Bruce Rothschild and Robert DePalma in an article published in the journal "Cretaceous Research". This specimen is described to have fossilized skin showing scars and tooth induced traumas on the skull in the form of large tooth drags, with size and spacing that leaves only Tyrannosaurus as the only likely assailant. Phil Bell of Pipestone Creek further stated that the skull injuries were consistent with tyrannosaur-bitten bones. There is also evidence for an aggressive interaction between a Triceratops and a Tyrannosaurus in the form of partially healed tyrannosaur tooth marks on a Triceratops brow horn and squamosal (a bone of the neck frill); the bitten horn is also broken, with new bone growth after the break. It is not known what the exact nature of the interaction was, though: either animal could have been the aggressor. Since the Triceratops wounds healed, it is most likely that the Triceratops survived the encounter and managed to overcome the Tyrannosaurus. Paleontologist Peter Dodson estimated that in a battle against a bull Triceratops, the Triceratops had the upper hand and would successfully defend itself by inflicting fatal wounds to the Tyrannosaurus using its sharp horns.

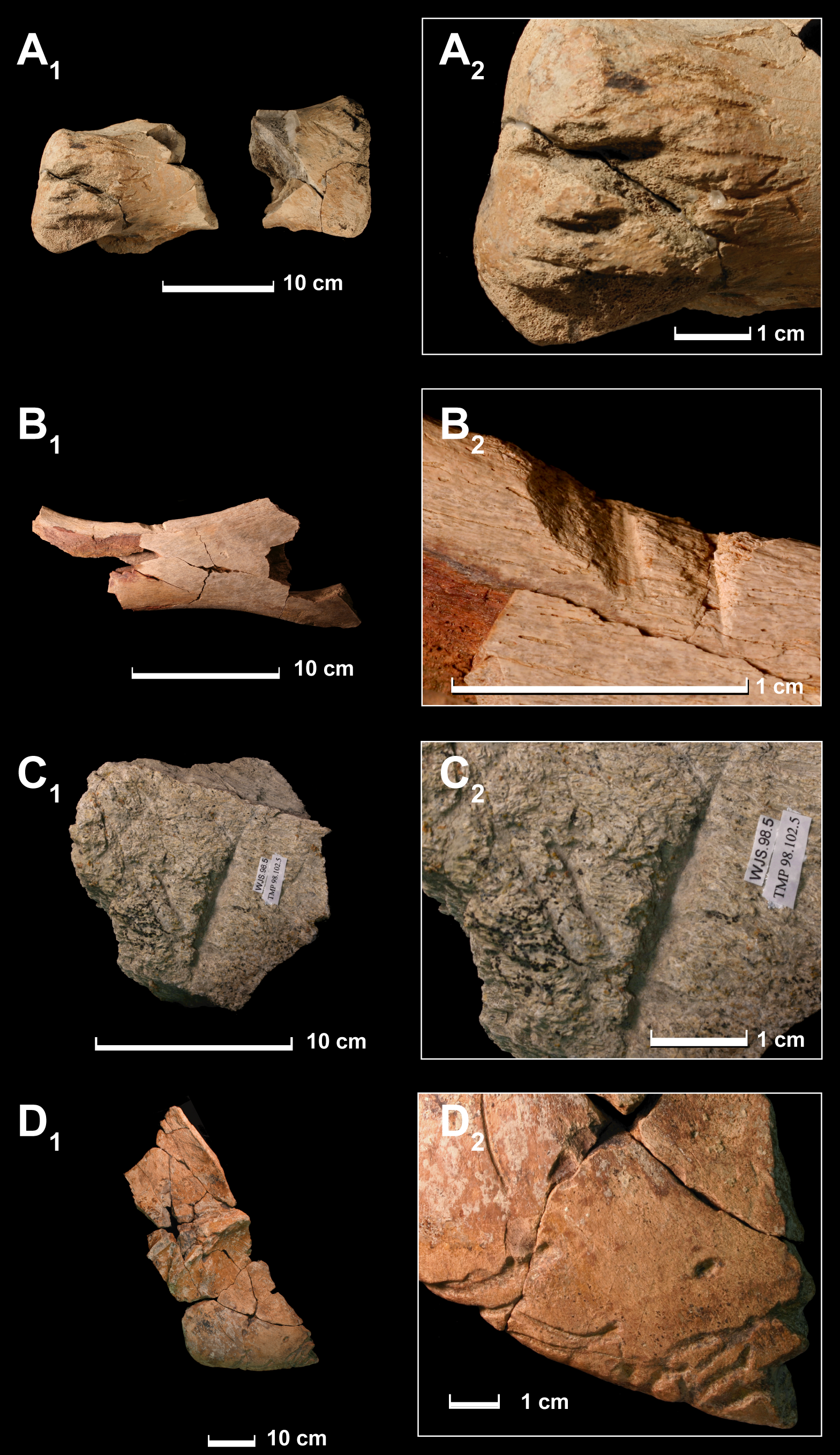
Tyrannosaurus tooth marks on bones of various herbivores

Various studies have also taken into account the ecosystem that Tyrannosaurus lived in. Some researchers argue that if Tyrannosaurus were a scavenger, another dinosaur had to be the top predator in the Amerasian Upper Cretaceous. Top prey were the larger marginocephalians and ornithopods. The other tyrannosaurids share so many characteristics that only small dromaeosaurs and troodontids remain as feasible top predators. In this light, scavenger hypothesis adherents have suggested that the size and power of tyrannosaurs allowed them to steal kills from smaller predators. However, a study published in 2011 by Chris Carbone, Samuel T. Turvey and Jon Bielby found that Tyrannosaurus would have been unable to compete as an obligate scavenger against smaller theropods and it would have been necessary for it to primarily hunt large prey. In addition, a study by Graeme D. Ruxton and David C. Houson in 2004 found that vertebrates would need to be large bodied and capable of soaring flight to be obligate scavengers. This study also suggested the evolution of a terrestrial obligate scavenger was unlikely even with the absence of birds because for terrestrial carnivores there is a lack of strong selection pressure towards becoming an exclusive scavenger. The study further adds that it may always be more advantageous for terrestrial carnivores to be able to retain the flexibility of obtaining food through hunting and scavenging. A census study of the Hell Creek Formation published by John Horner, Mark B. Goodwin and Nathan Myhrvold in 2011 found that because of their relative abundance, tyrannosaurs were more like hyenas: opportunistic feeders that dined on more than just live prey and a specific group of dinosaurs. Riley Black, however, held that this research did not overturn Tyrannosaurus's image as a predator, noting that research has found that spotted hyenas obtained a majority of their food from hunting; scavenging as little as 5% in some locations. He also noted that the census is an imperfect depiction of the area's ecology since various biases in collecting and preservation may have affected the results. For example, Tyrannosaurus may have regularly destroyed the skeletons of Edmontosaurus which it preyed upon. Horner, Goodwin and Myhrvold's study, according to a story by Smithsonian Magazine, actually shows what most palaeontologists believe; that Tyrannosaurus was an opportunistic carnivore; an animal that both hunted and scavenged. However, the energetic importance of scavenging in Tyrannosaurus may have been mainly restricted to juvenile individuals as a recent study has shown that multi-ton theropods would have gained little energy from scavenging after accounting for the energy expended from foraging. Another qualitative point is that smaller dinosaurs can still beat Tyrannosaurus Rex when wading in water that is less than knee-deep. If the biomechanics and energetics of running and walking while wading in water that is less than knee-deep are not significantly different from those of land-based locomotion, then those qualitative facts can be proven. This can have a significant impact in surviving or hunting as well.

Most paleontologists accept that Tyrannosaurus was an active predator, but would also scavenge opportunistically like virtually all other large predators. David Hone of Queen Mary, University of London, for example, wrote in his blog that ancering that it was either predator or scavenger in various papers has been unsatisfactory because it was most likely both. Switek also wrote that Tyrannosaurus was undoubtedly a predator and a scavenger, and that researchers have objected to the idea that Tyrannosaurus was an obligate scavenger and that there have only been a few studies to directly support the idea of Tyrannosaurus as an obligate scavenger. John Hutchinson, writing in his blog state that most scientists agree that Tyrannosaurus switched between being a predator and scavenger; not turning down a meal either dead or alive.

== Hunting strategies ==
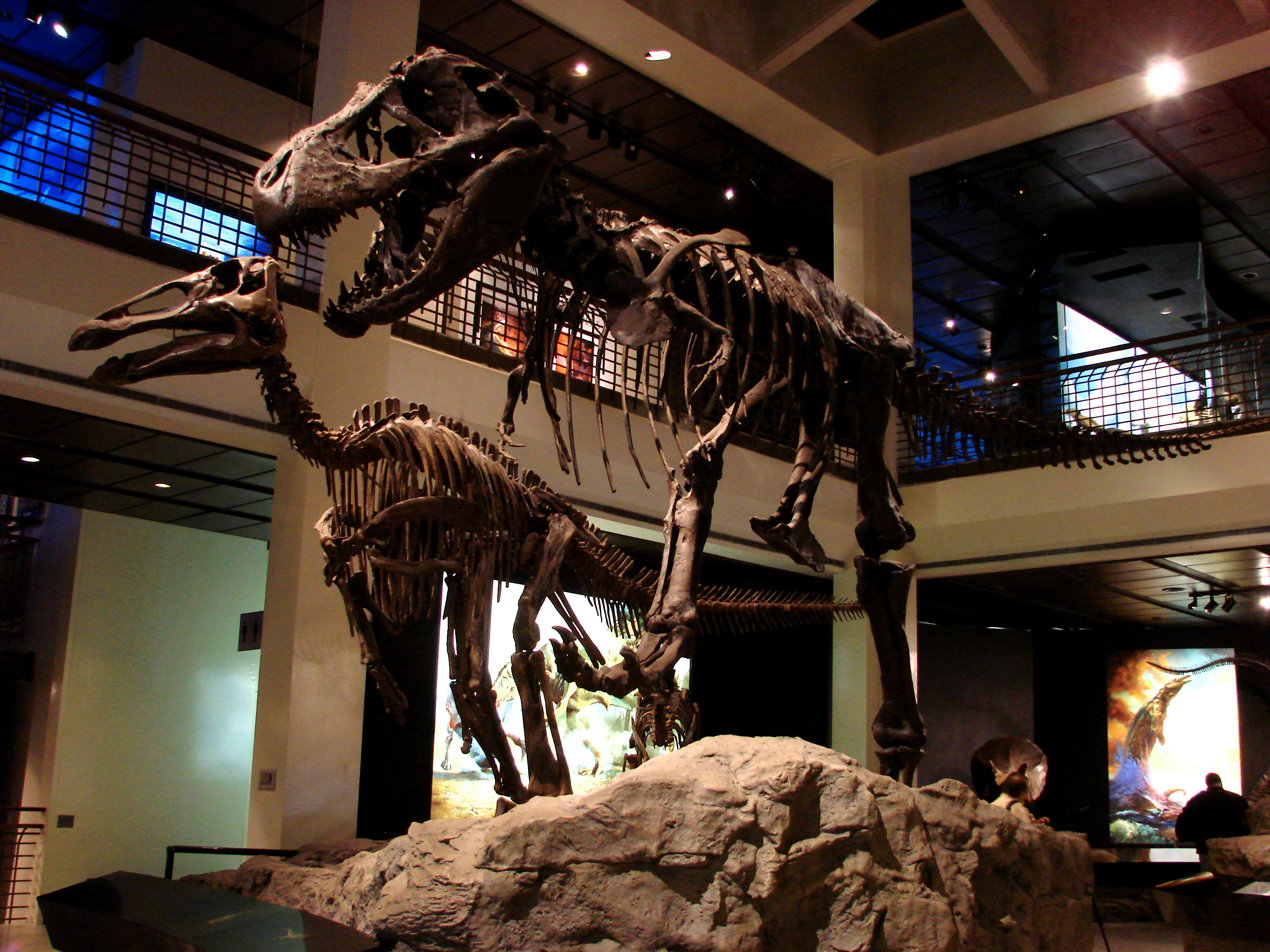
Edmontosaurus and a cast of the "Wankelrex" specimen, Houston Museum of Natural Science

Various proposals have been made regarding the ways Tyrannosaurus may have hunted. Though adult tyrannosaurs are often depicted in art and other media as frequently attacking other giant dinosaurs, research suggests this type of behavior would have been rare. As with other carnivorous dinosaurs and modern carnivores in general, Tyrannosaurus probably preferred to target small prey animals, including juveniles of larger dinosaur species. A 2010 analysis by Hone & Rauhut suggested that this may partially explain the general lack of small and juvenile dinosaur skeletons in the fossil record. Tyrannosaurids like Tyrannosaurus appear to have been specialized to crush and likely ingest the bones of their prey, and predation of juvenile dinosaurs would therefore have left fewer skeletons to fossilize.

Some studies also suggest that Tyrannosaurus preferred different prey at different stages of its life. In K. T. Bates and P. L. Falkingham's 2012 study, they found that there was a great disparity between the bite force of adult and juvenile Tyrannosaurus. According to the study, Tyrannosaurus only gained their powerful bite forces during their adulthood. This, according to the pair, suggest a difference in feeding ecologies between juveniles and adults; that the animals may have fed on different prey items at different stages of their lives. They propose that the powerful bite forces of adults may have allowed them to act as large prey specialists and thereby alleviate competition with younger tyrannosaurs. The juveniles according to the scientists were long-legged runners, but had relatively shallow skulls that were incapable of anchoring the muscles necessary to generate an adult Tyrannosaurus's bite force. However, when the animals grew their jaw muscles grew exponentially to the point that these muscles were huge even for animals of their size. The scientists suggest that juveniles chased after small prey while adults had the power to prey on megaherbivores such as Edmontosaurus and Triceratops. The scientists call this phenomenon as resource partitioning which would have given Tyrannosaurus a large evolutionary advantage. Horner, Goodwin and Myhrvold's 2011 census makes a similar proposition, proposing that adult Tyrannosaurus may not have directly competed with juveniles if the possibility of scavenging increased with size as they aged.

The University of Maryland's Thomas R. Holtz Jr. has proposed that Tyrannosaurus attacked prey like canids and hyaenids do; seizing and killing prey with the jaws, with limited use of the forelimbs for capture and dispatch. Holtz pointed out that Tyrannosaurus had stout, strong teeth and a bony palate; both of which would have enabled Tyrannosaurus to resist greater twisting loads and occasional bone contact than allosaurids or other typical theropods. Holtz elaborated that the incrassate (thickened) teeth of Tyrannosaurus were mechanically stronger than those of other theropods, with deep roots to withstand lateral forces during predation or feeding with a greater torsional component. Furthermore, Tyrannosaurus had a solidly built bony secondary palate found at the roof of its mouth that would also have strengthened it against torsional loads, a similar adaptation to that of crocodiles but uncommon amongst other theropods. In a lecture in 2013, Thomas Holtz Jr. would point out that torsion is encountered when biting into struggling prey and Tyrannosaurus resistance to torsional loads showed that it used a 'puncture and pull' method as opposed to the 'bite and slice' of many other theropods. He would also elaborate that like many reptiles, many dinosaurs did not have a hard palate. Tyrannosaurus, however, had a hard palate, just like mammals and crocodiles. Holtz along with James O. Farlow would also support freelance researcher Gregory S. Paul's suggestion that Tyrannosaurus could have used hit-and-run attacks on its prey.

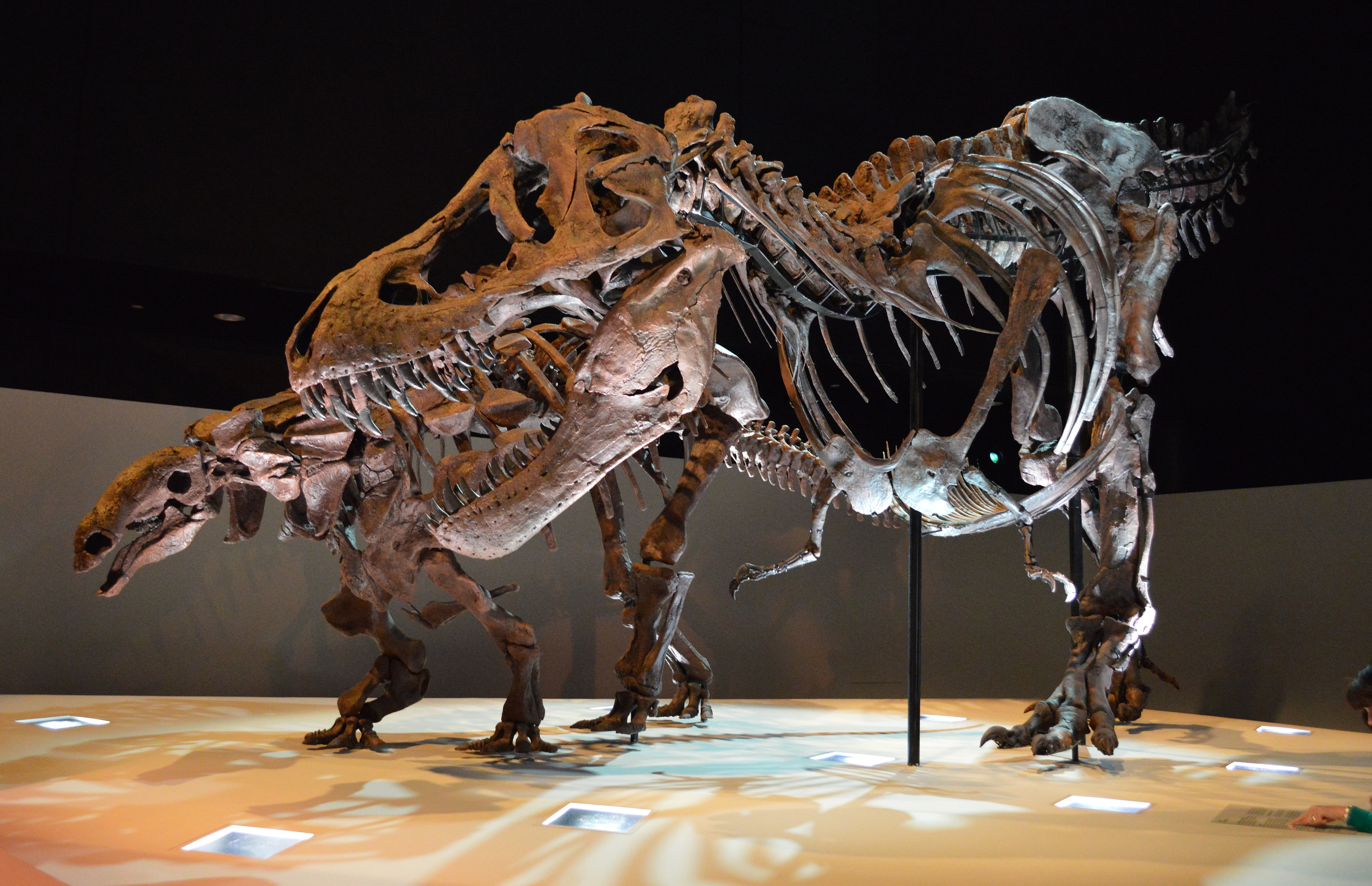
Denversaurus and the "Wyrex" specimen, Houston Museum of Natural Science

Gregory S. Paul has suggested that Tyrannosaurus was a high-risk predator that also attacked massive and dangerous prey; citing this as a reason tyrannosaurs died young. He would indicate that the fossil evidence of animals that surviving tyrannosaur attacks show that these animals were at least healthy enough to heal from their injuries; even suggesting the possibility that some of them may have been able to kill the attacker. Paul wrote that Triceratops were probably Tyrannosaurus's most challenging and dangerous prey; with horns and parrot like beaks that they could use for defence, and that Tyrannosaurus did not attack horned animals such as Triceratops head-on because that would have maximized the danger while lessening the chance of success. Instead Tyrannosaurus would attack these prey from behind, attempting to bite either the thigh or the caudofemoralis muscle to disable its prey. The Tyrannosaurus would have done this through either ambushing or trying to intimidate the horned animals into trying to run away which would have then exposed these animals to attack.

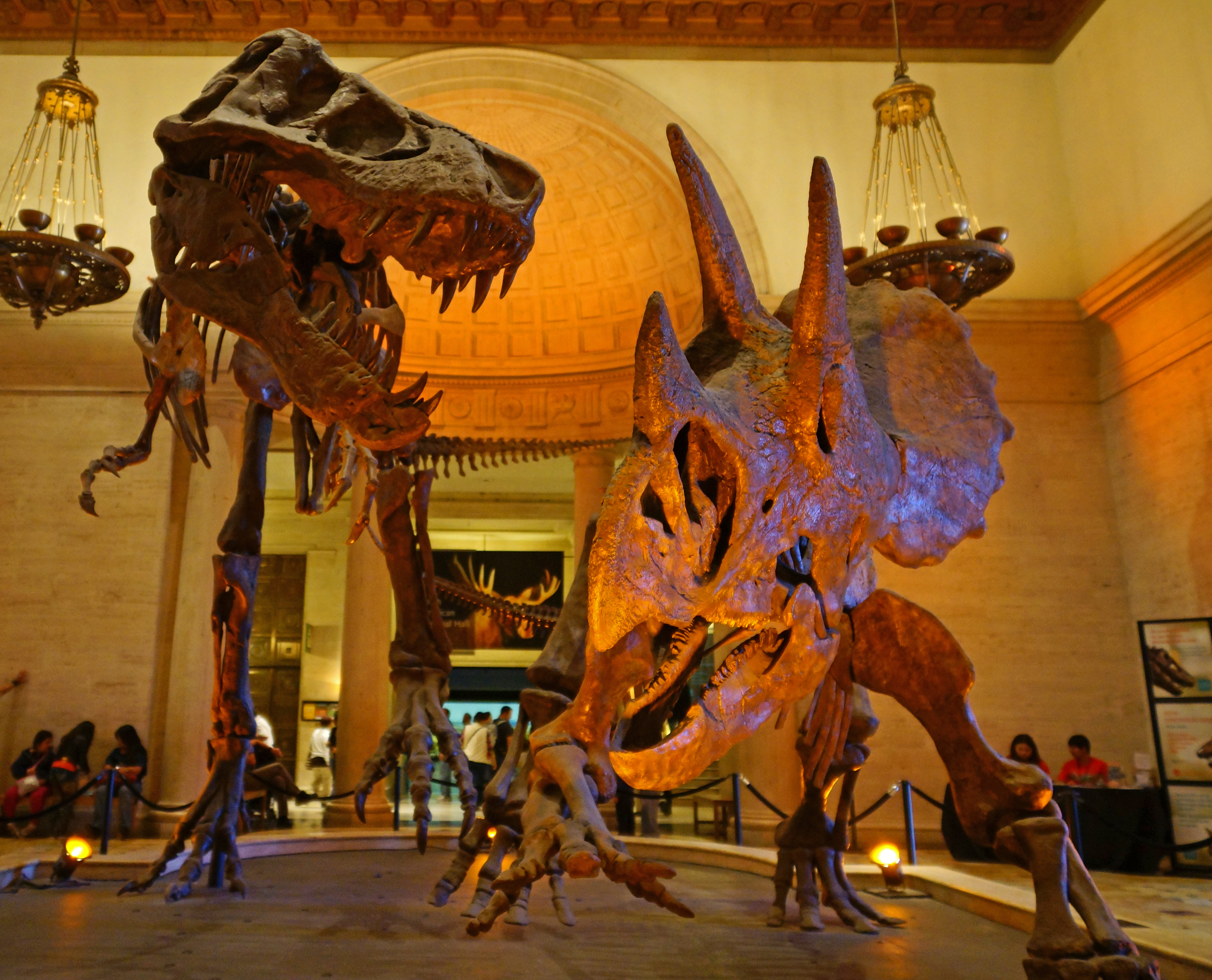
Tyrannosaurus and Triceratops at Los Angeles Natural History Museum

David A. Krauss and John M. Robinson proposed that Tyrannosaurus could have used a hunting strategy similar in concept to "cow tipping" against Triceratops, where the Tyrannosaurus would ambush and knock the Triceratops over to fall on its side. This strategy, according to the Krauss and Robinson could explain the unique characteristics of Tyrannosaurus. Tyrannosaurus's small, yet strong arms could have been adapted to grasp onto the back of Triceratops while pushing with its pectoral region, its large clawed feet would have given it better traction, its large head could have been used to tip the Triceratops over and its large mouth and bone piercing teeth would have made bites to the side more efficient and deadly. When the Triceratops had fallen over to its side, Tyrannosaurus would then bitten it at the rib cage; killing it. Krauss and Robinson backed up their proposal through physical analyses; finding that Tyrannosaurus moving at moderate speed could have generated enough force to topple Triceratops and would have only taken 2–3 seconds. Their study suggested that a Tyrannosaurus impacting the Triceratops at a conservative estimated speed of 7.5 meters per second would have enabled it to topple Triceratops without injuring itself, though there could be some variance depending on the sizes of the animals (Tyrannosaurus could have attacked a smaller Triceratops). Furthermore, their study noted that Triceratops would have experienced some difficulty quickly getting back up from being toppled on to its side. According to the study, modern day analogues of Triceratops such as rhinoceros, camels and large bovids, experience the same kind of difficulty, taking 3–10 seconds to recover. But Triceratops may have experienced more difficulty due to its frill. According to the study, Tyrannosaurus arms were adapted for this strategy, pushing the prey with its chest while gripping it with its arms reduced the chance of the prey slipping away while being pushed. The arms, being short yet strong reduced the chance of joint injury during this struggle. Also having more of the arm's power concentrated on its flexors instead of the extensors, were ideal since it would have had to flex its arms to keep its prey close. When the Tyrannosaurus is pressed against the side of Triceratops, its arms were at the right height to reach the spine of the Triceratops, providing a place to grip on. Furthermore, Krauss and Robinson suggest that this strategy would have been effective against other large ceratopsians and because the attack was done through an ambush, Tyrannosaurus would not have needed to compete in speed.

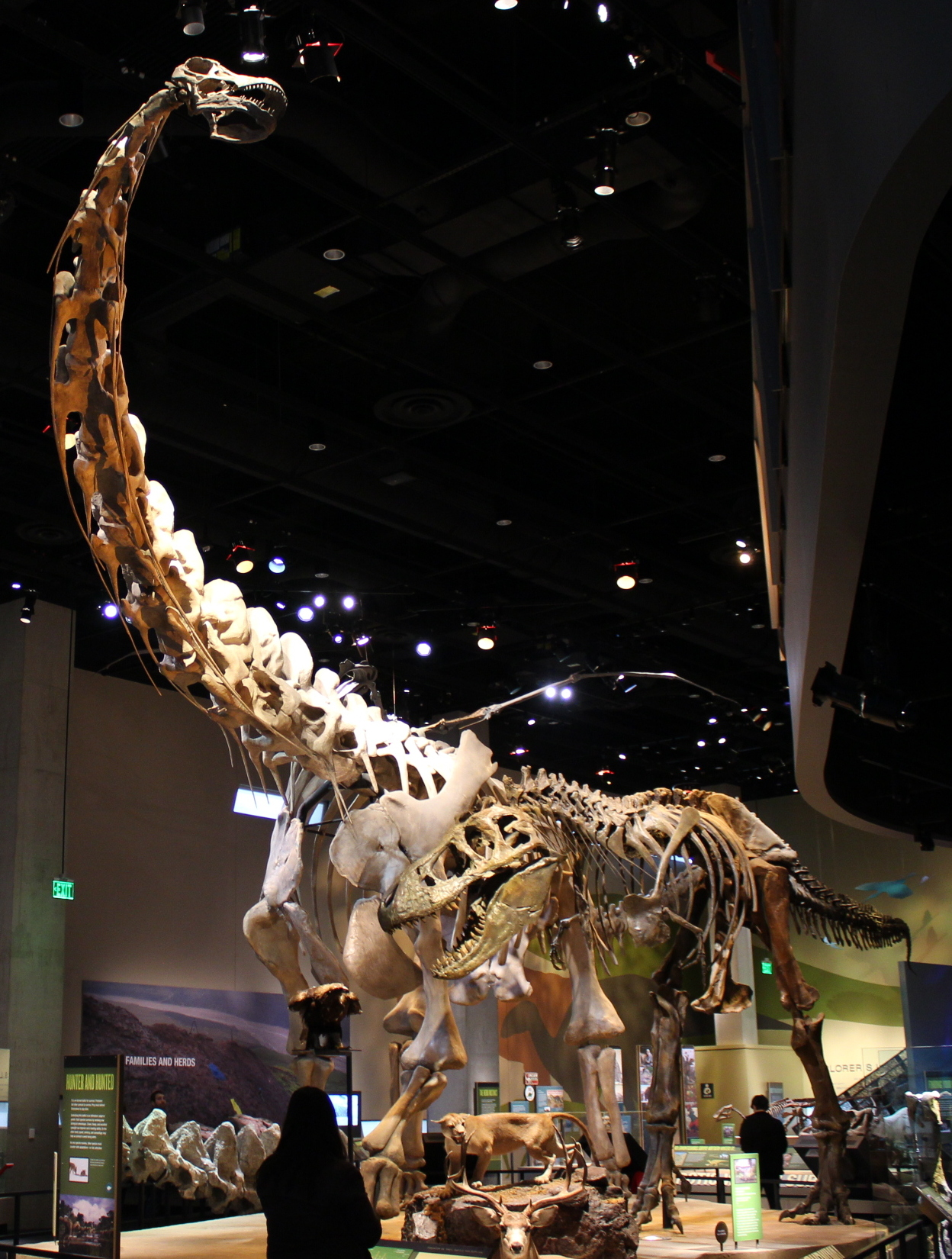
Alamosaurus and Tyrannosaurus at Perot Museum

Gregory S. Paul also discussed the defenses that hadrosaurs may have employed against tyrannosaurids such as Tyrannosaurus. Paul stated that duck-billed dinosaurs may have been able to kick out with its heavy footed hindlimbs. When faced with a predator, some duckbills were large and may have been able to use their size for protection, otherwise that the only apparent option for them to escape was to flee at maximum speed while attempting to land kicks on its pursuer. He would write that hadrosaurs, while using its forelimbs for locomotion, may have been able out turn tyrannosaurids. Paul wrote that hadrosaurs may have been gregarious (lived in groups) and may have prioritized trying to lose itself in the herd. He would also note that hadrosaurs were also lower-slung than their predators and may have therefore been able to use their forelimbs to push themselves through heavy vegetation; making it difficult for their predators to deliver effective bites.

A study by Lisa Cooper, Andrew H. Lee, Mark L. Taper and John R. Horner suggested that hadrosaurs may have also protected themselves through their rapid growth rates, growing faster than their predators, thus giving them a size advantage and enabling them to breed early. In National Geographic News, Andrew Lee explained that hadrosaurs and Tyrannosaurus may have started out the same size when they hatched, but by 5 years of age hadrosaurs would be the size of a cow while Tyrannosaurus would still be the size of a dog. It would also be stated that the sample hadrosaur in the study, Hypacrosaurus reached a length 30 feet in 10–12 years. Tyrannosaurus on the other hand reached a length of 40 feet, but it took more than twice as long to reach that size.

Tyrannosaurus may have had more endurance than hadrosaurs such as Edmontosaurus; though biomechanical studies have shown Edmontosaurus was the faster animal, its greater speed was only useful over short distances, while Tyrannosaurus, being better equipped for pursuit, likely would be able to, if able to keep the animal in sight, outpace and eventually subdue the hadrosaur once the herbivore tired. Such a strategy would save valuable energy while still allowing the Tyrannosaurus to actively chase down and kill its intended target.

Gregory S. Paul stated that tyrannosaurids attacked hadrosaurs by targeting the caudofemoralis muscle and thigh muscle to disable their prey's locomotor system, the abdomen to eviscerate their prey and the neck which would have caused the most rapid death by damaging the trachea and major blood vessels.

Tyrannosaurus was once proposed to have had infectious saliva used to kill its prey. This theory was first proposed by William Abler. Abler examined the teeth of tyrannosaurids between each tooth serration; the serrations may have held pieces of carcass with bacteria, giving Tyrannosaurus a deadly, infectious bite much like the Komodo dragon was originally thought to have. However, Jack Horner regards Tyrannosaurus tooth serrations as more like cubes in shape than the serrations on a Komodo monitor's teeth, which are rounded. All forms of saliva contain possibly hazardous bacteria, so the prospect of it being used as a method of predation is disputable.

== Feeding behavior ==
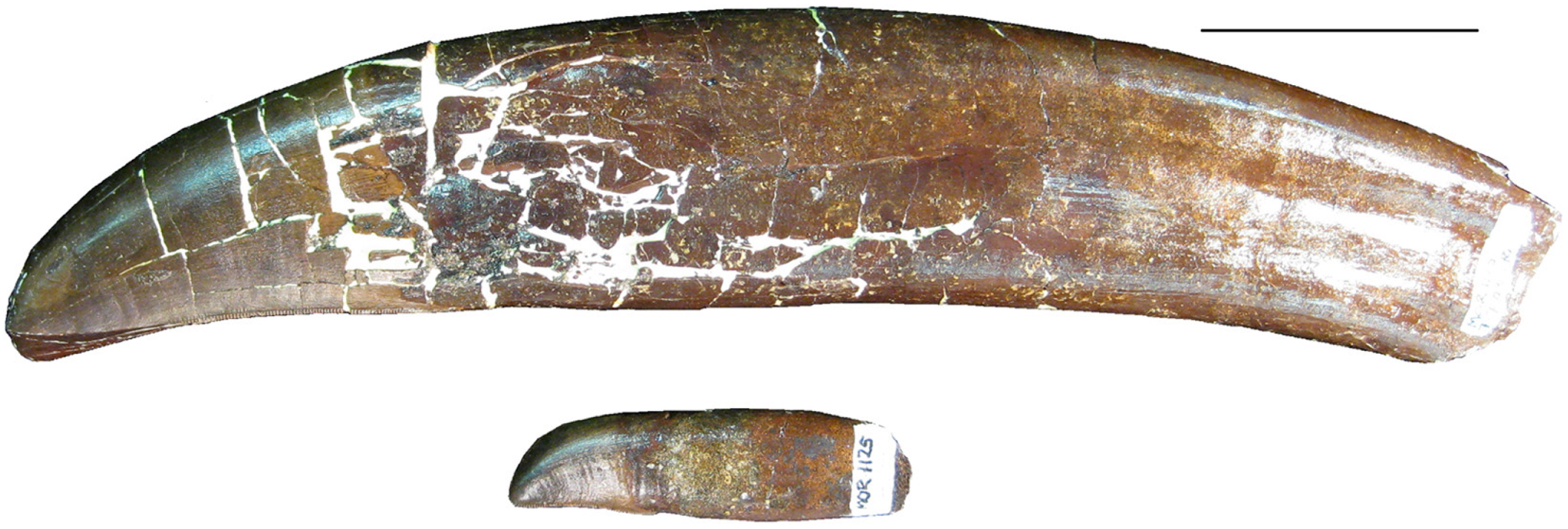
Two teeth from the lower jaw of specimen MOR 1125, "B-rex", showing the variation in tooth size within an individual

A few studies have also focused on Tyrannosaurus complex feeding habits. Tyrannosaurus, and most other theropods, probably primarily processed carcasses with lateral shakes of the head, like crocodilians. The head was not as maneuverable as the skulls of allosauroids, due to flat joints of the neck vertebrae. Eric Snively and Anthony Russell further elaborate in a study published in 2007 that Tyrannosaurus had a powerful neck that would have enabled it to strike rapidly at prey and take on complex and modulated inertial feeding; a way of feeding used by modern archosaurs that involved the animal ripping away chunks of meat, tossing it into the air and swallowing it. A team of paleontologists, led by Denver Fowler from the University of the Rockies would later discover that Tyrannosaurus employed a complex feeding strategy to consume Triceratops after analyzing various specimens. This involved the theropod repositioning and tearing off the head of the dead Triceratops, so that it could consume its meal's nutrient-rich neck muscles. Studies of Tyrannosaurus's teeth have also revealed that the animal's dentition was more complex than previously imagined. Researchers Kirstin Brink, Robert Reisz et al. found that Tyrannosaurus and other carnivorous theropods were equipped with teeth that were highly complex for carnivores; specialized layers of dentine enlarged the serration on the inside of the tooth structure. This unique structure, found in other large predators from other prehistoric eras, and found only in the modern Komodo dragon today is perfectly designed to handle the stresses of ripping into the flesh and biting into the bones of large prey animals without suffering large amounts of wear. This unique feature allowed theropods such as Tyrannosaurus to flourish for the entirety of their existence.

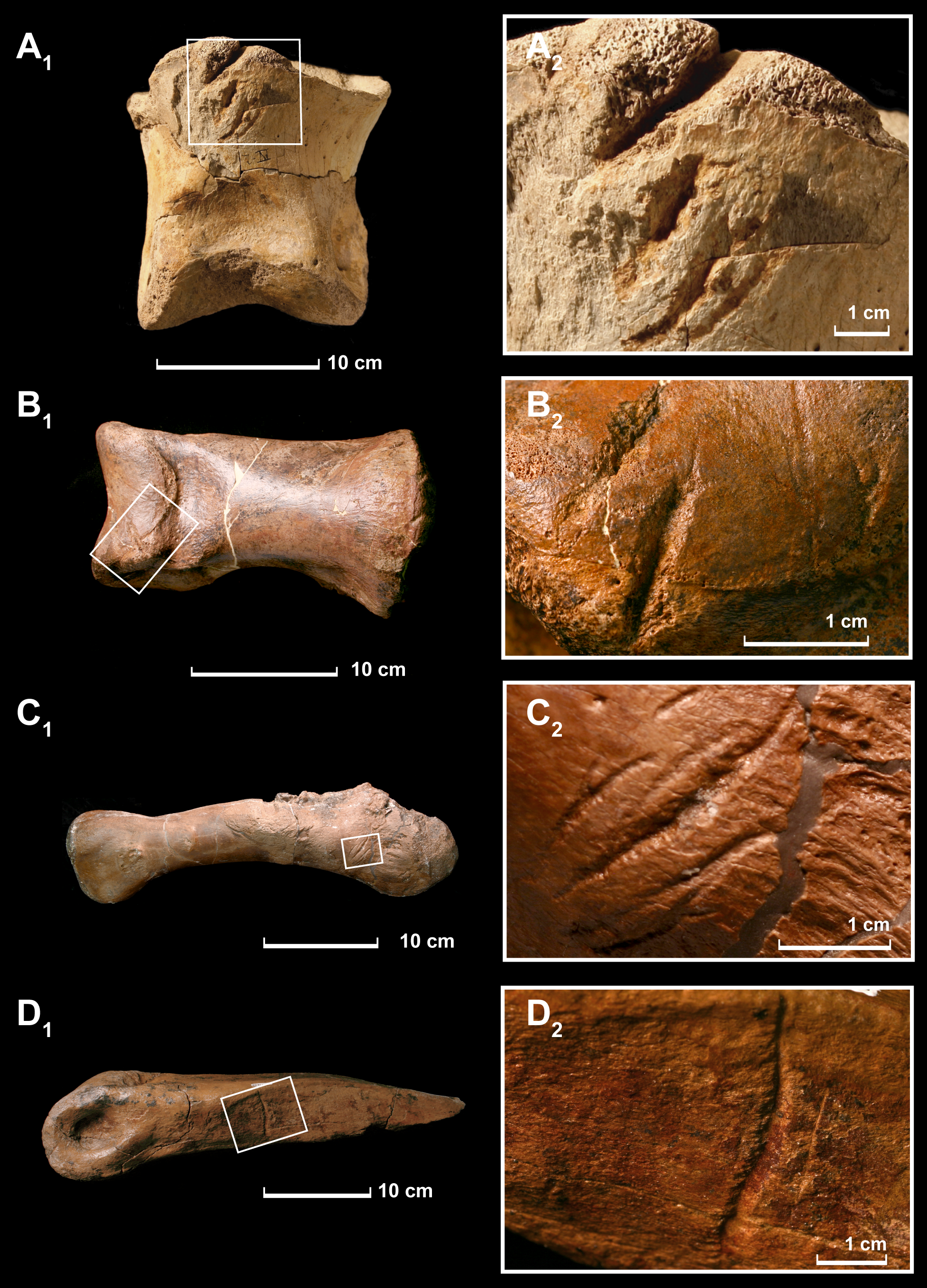
Tyrannosaurus bones with evidence of cannibalism

More findings have also shed light on how Tyrannosaurus interacted with each other. When examining Sue, paleontologist Pete Larson found a broken and healed fibula and tail vertebrae, scarred facial bones and a tooth from another Tyrannosaurus embedded in a neck vertebra. If correct, these might be strong evidence for aggressive behavior between tyrannosaurs but whether it would have been competition for food and mates or active cannibalism is unclear. However, further recent investigation of these purported wounds has shown that most are infections rather than injuries (or simply damage to the fossil after death) and the few injuries are too general to be indicative of intraspecific conflict.

== Cannibalism ==
Evidence also strongly suggests that tyrannosaurs were at least occasionally cannibalistic. Tyrannosaurus itself has strong evidence pointing towards it having been cannibalistic in at least a scavenging capacity based on tooth marks on the foot bones, humerus, and metatarsals of one specimen. Fossils from the Fruitland Formation, Kirtland Formation (both Campanian in age) and the Maastrichtian aged Ojo Alamo Formation suggest that cannibalism was present in various tyrannosaurid genera of the San Juan Basin. The evidence gathered from the specimens suggests opportunistic feeding behavior in tyrannosaurids that cannibalized members of their own species. A study from Currie, Horner, Erickson and Longrich in 2010 has been put forward as evidence of cannibalism in the genus Tyrannosaurus. They studied some Tyrannosaurus specimens with tooth marks in the bones, attributable to the same genus. The tooth marks were identified in the humerus, foot bones and metatarsals, and this was seen as evidence for opportunistic scavenging, rather than wounds caused by intraspecific combat. In a fight, they proposed it would be difficult to reach down to bite in the feet of a rival, making it more likely that the bitemarks were made in a carcass. As the bitemarks were made in body parts with relatively scantly amounts of flesh, it is suggested that the Tyrannosaurus was feeding on a cadaver in which the more fleshy parts already had been consumed. They were also open to the possibility that other tyrannosaurids practiced cannibalism.
