= Abley =

Abley is a surname. Notable people with the surname include:

- John Abley (1930–2011), Australian rules footballer
- Kevin Abley (1935–2024), Australian rules footballer
- Mark Abley (born 1955), Canadian poet, journalist, editor, and non-fiction writer

== See also ==
- Abler
