= Maribel Aber =

American journalist

Correspondent for CNN's Money Matters

Personal details
- Born: Maribel Alacbay O'Brien; November 28, 1973 (age 52)
- Education: University of Virginia (BA); New York Law School (JD)
- Occupation: Journalist

Maribel Aber (born Maribel Alacbay O'Brien; November 28, 1973) is a correspondent for CNN's Money Matters. She has previously been chief of staff for the vice chairman of NASDAQ.

== Career ==
She joined CNN in 2012, leaving her job as anchor of PBS' Wall Street Week. She has reported for CNN on financial, business, and personal finance news as they relate to families and consumers. She has also covered stories including the China Market Crash in 2015, the Sandy Hook Elementary school shooting and Facebook IPO in 2012. She graduated from the University of Virginia with a B.A. degree, majoring in foreign affairs. From there, she graduated from New York Law School with a J.D. degree in February 2003. Aber resides in New York City. She is married to Robert E. Aber, former Senior Vice President and General Counsel to NASDAQ.
