= Adolf Aber =

German musicologist and music critic (1893–1960)

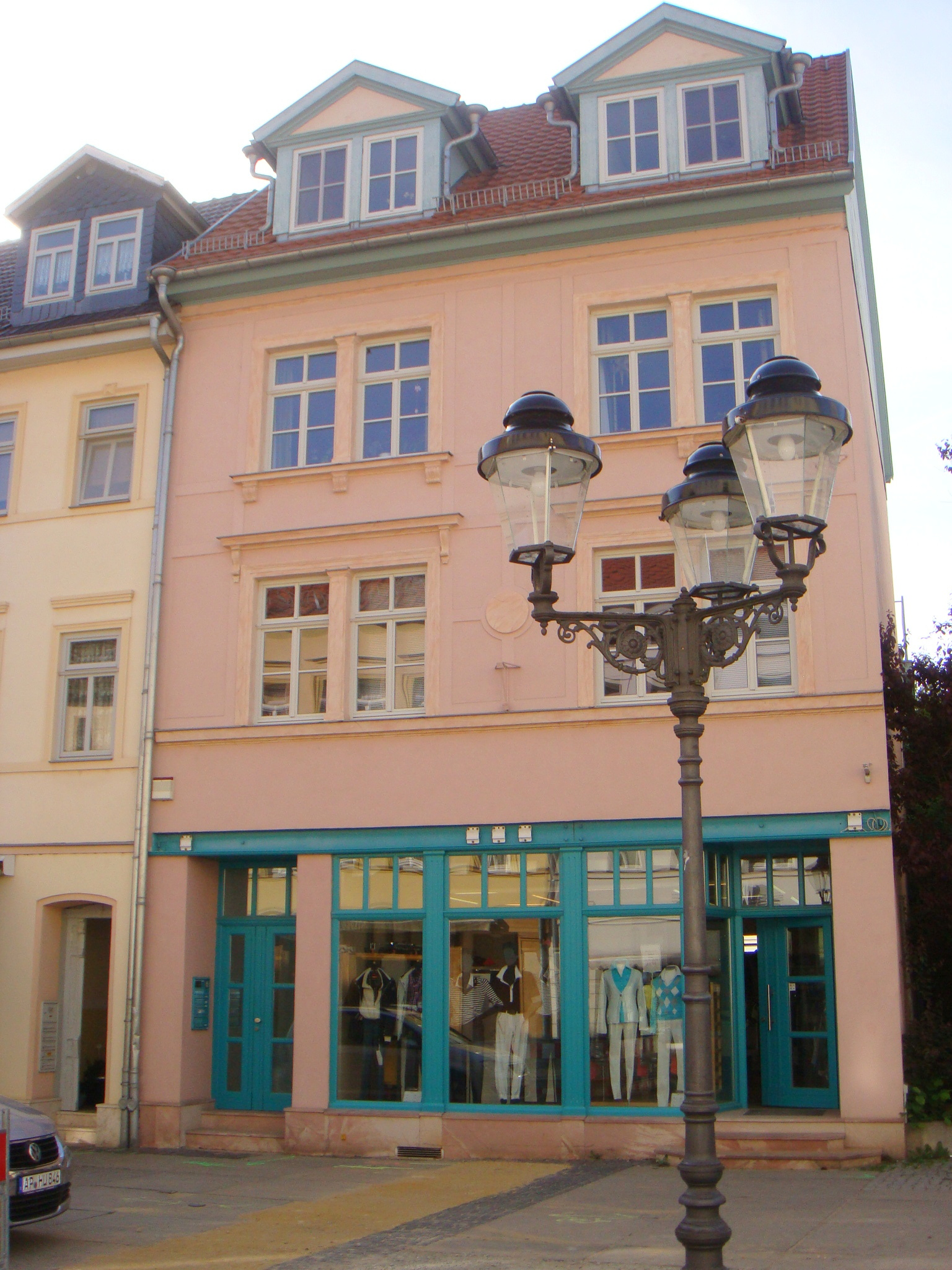
Office building of Emanuel Aber and birthplace of Adolf Aber in Apolda, Bahnhofstraße 7

Adolf Aber (28 January 1893 – 21 May 1960) was a German musicologist and music critic.

== Life ==
But he spent his childhood in Apolda, where he was born. His father, Emanuel Aber, ran a men's wear business. His special musical talent was recognized early on. In 1911, he passed his school-leaving examination as a primary school pupil at the Realgymnasium Weimar, which he would only have been able to do in Apolda when he reached full maturity in 1914. In the same year, he went to Berlin University and studied musicology there. Hermann Kretzschmar (1848–1924) became his teacher. His doctoral thesis, entitled Die Pflege der Musik unter den Wettinern und wettinischen Ernestinern von den Anfängen bis zur Auflösung der Weimarer Hofkapelle 1662 was considered so important that it was published in book form in 1921.

In 1919, Aber moved to Leipzig, where he worked for the Leipziger Neueste Nachrichten, at that time one of the most important daily newspapers in Germany, as a critic and from 1913 to 1933 as a music consultant. Some of his most important book publications appeared, as, for example, in 1922 the Handbuch der Musikliteratur in systematisch-chronologische Anordnung (Handbook of Music Literature in Systematic Chronological Order), which appeared in 1967 as a reprint. The concerts of the Gewandhaus Orchestra, the performances of the Leipzig Opera, and the St. Thomas Boys Choir in St. Thomas Church provided rich material for his reports. He concluded friendships with many composers, such as, for example, Richard Strauss.

When the National Socialists came to power, Aber emigrated to London with his wife, Mignon, née Platky. He became an employee, later publishing director, of the music publishing house Novello & Co., which still exists today. He printed the compositions of early Leipzig Thomaskantors, such as Johann Hermann Schein and Johann Kuhnau, and made a name for himself in particular by promoting German music abroad, which was not easy due to the aversion of the English to all things German. Through Aber's dedicated work, the dissemination of folk songs by Franz Schubert, Robert Schumann, and Johannes Brahms succeeded. He made contemporary composers like Fritz Jöde and Cesar Bresgen famous in England.

In 1958, on his 65th birthday, he was awarded the Order of Merit of the Federal Republic of Germany for his achievements by the President of Germany, Theodor Heuss. Afterwards, he and his wife were received by Queen Elizabeth II.

On 21 May 1960 Aber died in London at age 67 after a short illness. In the obituary of the publishing house Novello & Co., it says about him: "Adolf Aber — a man of comprehensive culture and stimulating temperament. He will be greatly missed, both in publishing circles and in the large circle of his friends, many of whom are among the most important musicians of our time".

== Work ==
- 1921 Doktorarbeit Die Pflege der Musik unter den Wettinern und wettinischen Ernestinern von den Anfängen bis zur Auflösung der Weimarer Hofkapelle 1662
- 1922 Handbuch der Musikliteratur in systematisch-chronologischer Anordnung (issued in 1967 in Hildesheim as reprint)

== Literature ==
- Ullmann, Dieter: Adolf Aber – ein bedeutender Musikwissenschaftler aus Apolda. Apoldaer Heimat 10 (1992) 23
- Paul Frank / Wilhelm Altmann: Kurzgefasstes Tonkünstler-Lexikon. Heinrichshofen’s Verlag Wilhelmshaven, 15th edition (1936) p. 1
- Friedrich Blume: Die Musik in Geschichte und Gegenwart, Bärenreiter-Verlag Kassel, 1st edition (vol. 1 – 17, 1949–1986) vol.15, p. 9; ISBN 3-7618-0410-5
