= Aber (software) =

Aber (Ukrainian: Абер) is an optics design and analyzing software for designing and simulating optical systems, including the use in ophthalmology.

Software created by Ukrainian optics researchers at Kyiv Politechnic Institute. Its run under Microsoft Windows.

== See also ==
- OSLO
- Zemax

== Publications ==
- Шиша, Т. О. Моделювання аберацій оптичної системи ока. Ч. 1. Огляд і порівняльний аналіз фізичних абераційних моделей ока / Т. О. Шиша, І. Г. Чиж // Наукові вісті НТУУ «КПІ» : міжнародний науково-технічний журнал. – 2009. – No. 5(67). – С. 104–111. URI: https://ela.kpi.ua/handle/123456789/36328
- Aber. Програма проектування оптичних систем : буклет. – Київ, 2011.
- Проектування оптико-цифрових систем : силабус. – Вінниця: ВНТУ, 2020.
- Поліщук, О. С. Комплексне удосконалення і розробка інтраокулярних лінз : дис. ... д-ра філософії : 163 Біомедична інженерія / Поліщук Олександр Сергійович. – Київ, 2022. URI: https://ela.kpi.ua/handle/123456789/54094
- Тесленко, В .А. Цифрова камера для дрона : дипломний проєкт ... бакалавра : 151 Автоматизація та комп'ютерно-інтегровані технології / Тесленко Володимир Андрійович. – Київ, 2021. URI: https://ela.kpi.ua/handle/123456789/41931
- Проскурін, В. С. Оптико-електронна система приладу нічного бачення : дипломний проєкт ... бакалавра : 151 Автоматизація та комп’ютерно-інтегровані технології / Проскурін Вадим Сергійович. – Київ, 2021. URI: https://ela.kpi.ua/handle/123456789/41920
