= Ted Aber =

American historian (1914–1989)

- Born: June 13, 1914; Amsterdam, New York
- Died: June 13, 1989 (aged 75)
- Education: Harvard University
- Occupations: Historian, public relations professional
- Writing career
- Years active: 1937-89
- Genre: History
- Notable works: The History of Hamilton County, Tales from an Adirondack County
- Military career
- Service: United States Army
- Service years: 1941–1945
- Rank: Captain
- Awards: Bronze Star Medal

Frederick Charles "Ted" Aber Jr. (June 13, 1914 – June 13, 1989) was an American historian and historical preservation activist. He is best known for recording the history and lore of the Adirondacks, in particular Hamilton County, one of only two counties entirely contained within the Adirondack Park.

== Early life, education and career ==
Aber was born in 1914 in Amsterdam, New York. He attended public schools there, then graduated from Harvard University in 1936. He began work at the Amsterdam Evening Recorder. In 1941, during World War II, he entered the U.S. Army as a private, rising to the rank of captain prior to his discharge in 1945.

After the war, Aber worked in advertising and public relations for Mohawk Carpet Mills, Le Moyne College and the New York Lottery. He also co-founded radio station WCSS in Amsterdam.

== Local historian and preservationist ==
While working in public relations, Aber and Hamilton County historian Stella King published Tales from an Adirondack County, a collection of folklore from Hamilton County, in 1961. They followed that volume in 1965 with The History of Hamilton County. They spent several years researching the tome, which the New York Times noted was "nearly as long as The History of the Decline and Fall of the Roman Empire." By the 1980s, the book was out of print, but it was considered a hot item in the used book market, selling at prices of over $60, and the Hamilton County Board of Supervisors was considering reissuing the book. The book covered all towns in Hamilton County—Arietta, Benson, Hope, Indian Lake, Inlet, Lake Pleasant, Long Lake, Morehouse and Wells—and as part of his research Aber created a series of 1,600 alphabetized family-name files filled with hand-recorded entries.

From 1979 to 1989, Aber was the official historian of both Hamilton County and the town of Indian Lake, where he lived, appointed to both posts under New York's Arts and Cultural Affairs Law. As part of these roles, he often assisted members of the public with genealogical research on Hamilton County relatives and forebears. In 1980 he published a collection of historical stories entitled Adirondack Folks.

In addition to his historical research, Aber was involved in several historical preservation efforts, including advocating for the preservation of Adirondack fire towers, campaigning to have the county jail and courthouse listed on the National Register of Historic Places and restoring the Wells Baptist Church for use as an event venue.

== Death ==
Aber was in ill health in his later years. He died on June 13, 1989, and services were held in his home congregation, the Indian Lake United Methodist Church.
