= Aber Isle =

Freshwater Island

Coordinates: 56°4′N 4°32′W

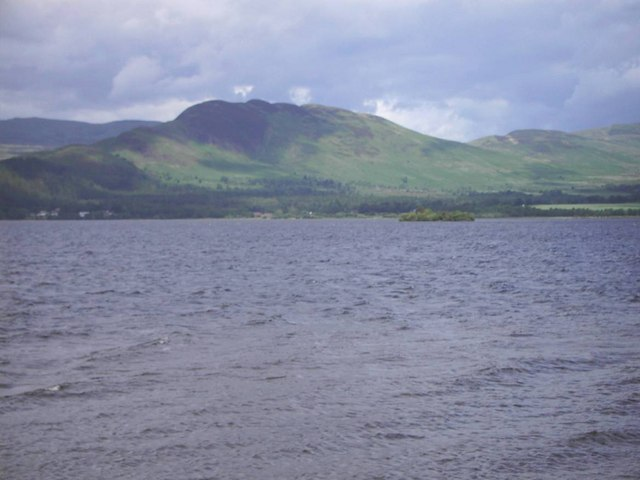
Aber Inch is the small island in front of the mainland in this picture.

Aber Isle or Aber Inch is a small island in Loch Lomond, in west central Scotland. It is near the mouth of the River Endrick, by the abandoned village of Aber, and is 1/2 mile (800 metres) from Clairinch. Its name derives from the Celtic word for the mouth of a river, or Gaelic eabar meaning "mud, mire".

There are some trees on it including alders and a collection of Scots pine and Hornbeam.

It is owned as part of Claddoch, north of Gartocharn.
