= William Abler =

American paleontologist

William L. Abler or simply known as Bill Abler was a paleontologist who has mostly studied the teeth of dinosaurs and also proposed a radical theory of human language that sees it sharing the same fundamental principles as mathematics and algebra.

He has studied tyrannosaurine teeth and has concluded that Tyrannosaurus had infectious saliva that could have helped it kill prey. In modern animals this saliva can be seen in many monitor lizards, such as Varanus komodoensis, commonly known as the Komodo dragon or Komodo monitor.

He has written papers and books on paleontology, one of them is The Teeth of the Tyrannosaurs.

Abler's most significant area of study is a decades-long investigation of the nature of human mind, language and mathematics, which he sees as unified and subject to the same first principles. Beginning in 1989 through to his 2005 book Structure of Matter, Structure of Mind: Man's Place in Nature, Reconsidered, Abler proposes a theory of language based on its commonalities with algebra and arithmetic and centred on sentence symmetry and their equivalence with mathematical equations. Abler, who refers to his theory the numberline principle, rejects the dominant assumption that language arose as a result of natural selection in humans. Abler's theory, described as of "extraordinary originality," it has not found widespread attention or support to date.
